= List of Liberty ships (J. F–J. W) =

This section of List of Liberty ships is a sortable list of Liberty ships—cargo ships built in the United States during World War II—with names beginning with J. F through J. W.

== Description ==
The standard Liberty ship (EC-2-S-C1 type) was a cargo ship 441 feet 6 inches (134.57 m) long overall, with a beam of 56 feet 10 3/4 inches (17.34 m). It had a depth of 37 feet 4 inches (11.38 m) and a draft of 26 feet 10 inches (8.18 m). It was powered by a triple expansion steam engine, which had cylinders of 24 1/2 inches (62 cm), 37 inches (94 cm) and 70 inches (180 cm) diameter by 48 inches (120 cm) stroke. The engine produced 2,500ihp at 76rpm. Driving a four-blade propeller 18 feet 6 inches (5.64 m) in diameter, could propel the ship at 11 knots (20 km/h).

Cargo was carried in five holds, numbered 1–5 from bow to stern. Grain capacity was 84,183 cubic feet (2,383.8 m^{3}), 145,604 cubic feet (4,123.0 m^{3}), 96,429 cubic feet (2,730.6 m^{3}), 93,190 cubic feet (2,639 m^{3}) and 93,190 cubic feet (2,639 m^{3}), with a further 49,086 cubic feet (1,390.0 m^{3}) in the deep tanks. Bale capacity was 75,405 cubic feet (2,135.2 m^{3}), 134,638 cubic feet (3,812.5 m^{3}), 83,697 cubic feet (2,370.0 m^{3}), 82,263 cubic feet (2,329.4 m^{3}) and 82,435 cubic feet (2,334.3 m^{3}), with a further 41,135 cubic feet (1,164.8 m^{3}) in the deep tanks.

It carried a crew of 45, plus 36 United States Navy Armed Guard gunners. Later in the war, this was altered to a crew of 52, plus 29 gunners. Accommodation was in a three deck superstructure placed midships. The galley was equipped with a range, a 25 US gallons (95 L) stock kettle and other appliances. Messrooms were equipped with an electric hot plate and an electric toaster.

== J. Frank Cooper ==
J. Frank Cooper was built by California Shipbuilding Corporation, Terminal Island, Los Angeles, California. Her keel was laid on 21 January 1944. She was launched on 17 February and delivered on 6 March. Built for the War Shipping Administration (WSA), she was operated under the management of De La Rama Steamship Company, Inc. Sold in 1947 to Unione Società di Navigazione, Genoa, Italy and renamed Ciclope. Collided with the British passenger ship Asia 15 nautical miles (28 km) off St. Catherine's Point, Isle of Wight, United Kingdom on 25 August 1948 whilst on a voyage from Odessa, Soviet Union to Antwerp, Belgium. Sold in 1962 to Compagnia Sicula di Navigazione, Palermo, Sicily, Italy and renamed Maria Lauretania. Sold in 1963 to The Drive Shipping Transports Organisations Co., Malta and renamed Amalia. Reflagged to the United Kingdom and operated under the management of Livanos & Sons. She was scrapped at Sakaide, Japan in February 1969.

== J. Fred Essary ==
J. Fred Essary was built by Bethlehem Fairfield Shipyard, Baltimore, Maryland. Her keel was laid on 8 November 1943. She was launched on 30 November and delivered to the United States Navy as Saggitarius on 8 December. Returned to the WSA in January 1946 and renamed J. Fred Essary. Laid up in the James River. She arrived at Castellón de la Plana, Spain for scrapping in November 1972.

== J. H. Drummond ==
J. H. Drummond was built by J. A. Jones Construction Company, Panama City, Florida. Her keel was laid on 25 May 1944. She was launched on 30 June and delivered on 20 July. Built for the WSA, she was operated under the management of American Export Lines. Sold in 1946 to the Dutch Government and renamed Hugo de Groot. Placed under the management of Nederlandsche Stoomboot Maatschappij in 1947. Sold in 1950 to Amsterdam N.V. Reederij, Amsterdam and renamed Amstelpark. Sold in 1960 to International Navigation Corp. and renamed Severn River. Reflagged to Liberia and placed under the management of William H. Muller. Reflagged to Panama in 1961. Sold in 1965 to Compania Eleosa Navigation, Panama and renamed Angelic. Operated under the management of Kronos Shipping Co. Ran aground off the Nojimazaki Lighthouse, Japan (35°02′N 140°01′E) on 25 July 1966 whilst on a voyage from Vancouver, Washington, United States to a Japanese port. She was refloated on 6 August and towed in to Tateyama. She was scrapped at Yokosuka, Japan in December 1966.

== J. H. Kincaid ==
J. H. Kincaid was built by Permanente Metals Corporation, Richmond, California. Her keel was laid on 5 March 1943. She was launched on 2 April and delivered on 14 April. She was scrapped in the United States c.1966.

== J. Howland Gardner ==
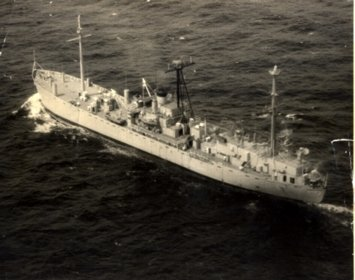
USS Jamestown

J. Howland Gardner was a boxed aircraft transport ship built by New England Shipbuilding Corporation, South Portland, Maine. Her keel was laid on 4 May 1945. She was launched on 10 July and delivered on 14 August. Laid up at Wilmington, North Carolina in December 1946, but returned to service in January 1947. Laid up in the James River in October 1947. To the United States Navy in August 1962 and renamed Jamestown. Converted for naval use by Newport News Shipbuilding & Drydock Co., Newport News, Virginia. Struck from the Navy list in December 1969. She was sold to Dutch shipbreakers in August 1970. Resold to Spanish shipbreakers in February 1971.

== Jim Bridger ==
Jim Bridger was built by Oregon Shipbuilding Corporation, Portland, Oregon. Her keel was laid on 22 November 1942. She was launched on 17 December and delivered on 25 December. Laid up at Beaumont, Texas post-war, she was scuttled off Port O'Connor, Texas on 15 June 1976.

== J. L. M. Curry ==
J. L. M. Curry was built by Alabama Drydock Company, Mobile, Alabama. She was completed on 15 May 1942. Built for the WSA, she was operated under the management of Lykes Brothers Steamship Company. She started to break up in severe weather in the Greenland Sea (70°54′N 0°24′E) on 7 March 1943 whilst on a voyage from Murmansk, Soviet Union to Loch Ewe. She was sunk the next day by an Allied warship.

== J. Maurice Thompson ==
J. Maurice Thompson was built by Permanente Metals Corporation. Her keel was laid on 31 October 1943. She was launched on 19 November and delivered on 28 November. Built for the WSA, she was operated under the management of American President Lines. Sold in 1947 to Rethymnis & Kulukundis, Piraeus, Greece and renamed Mount Athos. Sold in 1951 to C. Scarvellis, Chios, Greece. Operated under the management of her previous owner. She collided with the British coaster St. Ronan off the coast of Kent. United Kingdom on 12 July 1959. St. Ronan was cut in two and sank. Sold in 1961 to Afthonia Compania Navigation, Panama and renamed Euxeinos. Operated under the management of Dynamic Shipping Inc. She sprang a leak in the Atlantic Ocean 360 nautical miles (670 km) south west of the Azores (33°05′N 31°10′W) on 27 February 1966 whilst on a voyage from Evi Göçek, Turkey to Baltimore. She was abandoned and was presumed to have sunk.

== Joaquin Miller ==
Joaquin Miller was built by Permanente Metals Corporation. Her keel was laid on 23 May 1942. She was launched on 22 July and delivered on 29 August. Laid up at Mobile post-war, she was scrapped at Mobile in June 1970.

== Joe C. S. Blackburn ==
Joe C. S. Blackburn was built by J. A. Jones Construction Company, Brunswick, Georgia. Her keel was laid on 30 October 1943. She was launched on 15 December and delivered on 30 December. Built for the WSA, she was operated under the management of Black Diamond Steamship Company. She was converted to a floating dock at Portland, Oregon in 1968.

== Joe Fellows ==
Joe Fellows was built by California Shipbuilding Corporation. Her keel was laid on 12 February 1944. She was launched on 10 March and delivered on 29 March. Built for the WSA, she was operated under the management of Pope & Talbot Inc. Sold in 1947 to Compania Maritima Grevat and renamed Norlago. Reflagged to Panama and operated under the management of Union Maritime & Shipping Co. Sold in 1950 to Vetmar Compania de Vapores, Honduras and renamed Syra. Remained under the Panamanian flag and operated under the management of Trans-Ocean Steamship Agency. Reflagged to Honduras in 1952, then Liberia in 1955. Sold in 1956 to Deandbee Steamship Corp. and renamed Londredam. Operated under the management of American Anthracite & Butuminous Coal Corp. Sold in 1957 to Savoy Shipping Co. and renamed Antibes. Operated under the management of Union Maritime & Shipping Co. Sold in 1965 to Engardios Compania Navigation and renamed Elias D. Operated under the management of Ionic Shipping Agency. Sold in 1965 to Compania International Laconia, Panama and renamed Archangel Michael. Remained under the Liberian flag and operated under the management of Trident Shipping Agency. She ran aground on the Bural Reef, in the Gulf of Kutch off Port Okha, India (22°27′N 68°59′E) on 28 July 1966 whilst on a voyage from Tampa, Florida, United States to Kandla, India. She broke in two and was abandoned as a total loss. The wreck was destroyed by fire in November 1966.

== Joe Harris ==
Joe Harris was built by Permanente Metals Corporation. Her keel was laid on 16 April 1944. She was launched on 5 May and delivered on 12 May. She was scrapped in Baltimore in 1957.

== Joel Chandler Harris ==
Joel Chandler Harris was a limited troop carrier built by Alabama Drydock Company. She was completed on 12 September 1942. Built for the WSA, she was operated under the management of J. H. Winchester & Co. Management transferred to Coastwise Line, San Francisco, California in 1948. Sold to her managers in 1949. Sold to Grainfleet Inc., New York in 1956 and renamed Grain Shipper. Sold in 1958 to Pacific Explorer Corp. and renamed Pacific Explorer. Operated under the management of Zilkha Corp. Sold in 1960 to Lion Steamship Corp and renamed Montego Sea. Sold in 1961 to Sky Shipping Ltd. and renamed Toxon. Reflagged to Greece and operated under the management of Standard Marine Ltd. Sold in 1962 to Milos Maritime Co. and renamed Fanmar. Operated under the management of Pacific Steamship Agency. Sold in 1965 to Lilly Navigation Inc. and renamed Fanlil. Reflagged to Liberia and operated under the management of Poseidon Shipping Ltd. She was scrapped at Hirao, Japan in July 1968.

== Joel Palmer ==
Joel Palmer was built by Oregon Shipbuilding Corporation. Her keel was laid on 16 May 1943. She was launched on 5 June and delivered on 13 June. She was scrapped at Philadelphia, Pennsylvania in September 1964.

== Joel R. Poinsett ==
Joel R. Poinsett was built by Todd Houston Shipbuilding Corporation, Houston, Texas. Her keel was laid on 31 December 1942. She was launched on 19 February 1943 and delivered on 28 February. She was built for the WSA. She broke in two in the Atlantic Ocean (43°30′N 56°30′W) on 4 March 1944 whilst on a voyage from Southampton, United Kingdom to New York. The stern section was towed in to Halifax, Dominion of Canada on 21 March. It was subsequently used as a depot ship.

== Johan Printz ==
Johan Printz was built by J. A. Jones Construction Company, Brunswick. Her keel was laid on 7 August 1944. She was launched on 18 September and delivered on 29 September. Built for the WSA, she was operated under the management of Parry Navigation Co. Laid up in the James River post-war, she was scrapped at Philadelphia in April 1971.

== John A. Campbell ==
John A. Campbell was built by J. A. Jones Construction Company, Brunswick. Her keel was laid on 13 April 1943. She was launched on 14 August and delivered on 31 August. Built for the WSA, she was operated under the management of Moore-McCormack Lines. She was scrapped at Portland, Oregon in 1968.

== John Adams ==
John Adams was built by Permanente Metals Corporation. Her keel was laid on 17 September 1941. She was launched on 18 January 1942 and delivered on 16 March. Built for the WSA, she was operated under the management of Sudden & Christensen. Torpedoed and damaged off the coast of New Caledonia (23°30′S 164°35′E by I-21 on 5 May 1942 whilst on a voyage from Noumea, New Caledonia to Brisbane, Australia. She caught fire, exploded and sank.

== John A. Dix ==
John A. Dix was built by New England Shipbuilding Corporation. Her keel was laid on 19 October 1942. She was launched on 2 January 1943 and delivered on 4 February. Built for the WSA, she was operated under the management of Shephard Steamship Co. To the French Government in 1947 and renamed Saint Tropez. Operated under the management of Fabre Line. Management transferred to Compagnie de Navigation Fraissinet in 1952. Sold in 1961 to Mariafortuna Navigation, Panama and renamed Mariasmi. Reflagged to Liberia and operated under the management of Chandris Ltd. Sold in 1963 to Mariapetanos Navigation, Panama. Remained under the Liberian flag and operated under the management of Chandris Inc. She was scrapped at Kaohsiung, Taiwan in June 1968.

== John A. Donald ==
John A. Donald was built by Bethlehem Fairfield Shipyard. Her keel was laid on 22 May 1943. She was launched on 15 June and delivered on 30 June. She was scrapped at Philadelphia in 1964.

== John A. Johnson ==
John A. Johnson was built by Oregon Shipbuilding Corporation. Her keel was laid on 19 May 1943. She was launched on 8 June and delivered on 16 June. Built for the WSA, she was operated under the management of American Mail Line. Torpedoed and damaged in the Pacific Ocean (29°55′N 141°25′W) on 30 October 1944 by Japanese submarine I-12 whilst on a voyage from San Francisco to Honolulu, Hawaii. She broke in two and was abandoned. Both sections were shelled by I-12. The bow section exploded and sank. the stern section was set afire and sank.

== John Alden ==
John Alden was built by California Shipbuilding Corporation. Her keel was laid on 28 April 1943. She was launched on 22 May and delivered on 4 June. She was scrapped at Oakland, California in 1959.

== John A. Logan ==
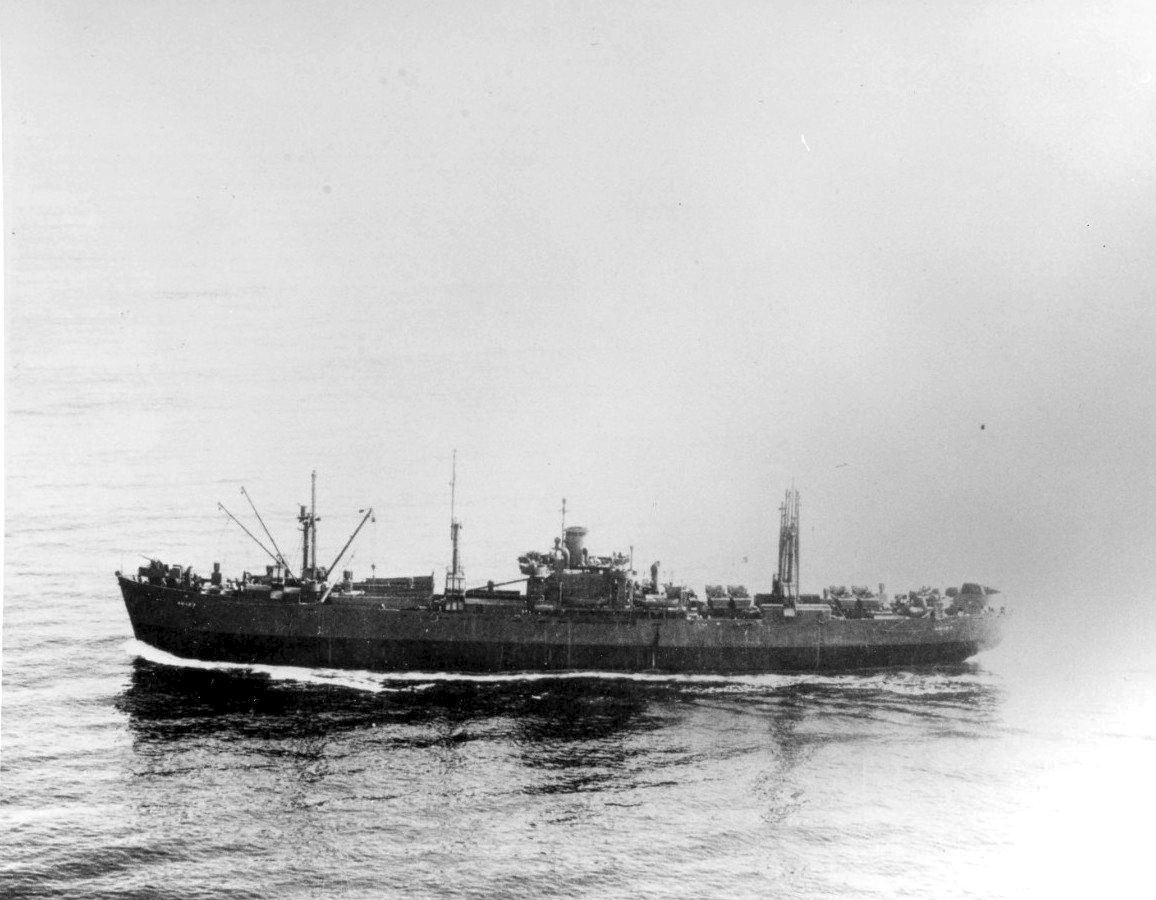
USS Alnitah

John A. Logan was built by Permanente Metals Corporation. Her keel was laid on 10 December 1942. She was launched on 14 January 1943 and delivered on 27 January. To the United States Navy in October 1943 and renamed Alnitah. Returned to the WSA in March 1946 and renamed John A. Logan. Laid up, she was scrapped at Portland, Oregon in May 1961.

== John A. Poor ==
John A. Poor was built by New England Shipbuilding Corporation. Her keel was laid on 14 May 1943. She was launched on 23 June and delivered on 7 July. Built for the WSA, she was operated under the management of International Freighting Corp. She struck three mines and was damaged in the Atlantic Ocean (42°51′N 64°55′W) on 28 July 1943 whilst on a voyage from Boston, Massachusetts to Halifax. She was towed in to Halifax and subsequently repaired. Torpedoed and sunk in the Arabian Sea (13°58′N 70°30′E) by U-510 on 19 March 1944 whilst on a voyage from Cochin, India to an American port.

== John A. Quitman ==
John A. Quitman was built by Delta Shipbuilding Company, New Orleans, Louisiana. Her keel was laid on 23 April 1943. She was launched on 2 June and delivered on 18 June. Laid up in the James River post-war, she was sold to shipbreakers in Cleveland, Ohio in January 1973.

== John A. Rawlins ==
John A. Rawlins was built by Permanente Metals Corporation. Her keel was laid on 19 October 1942. She was launched on 27 November and delivered on 3 December. Built for the WSA, she was driven ashore and wrecked in a typhoon at Okinawa, Japan on 17 September 1945. She was subsequently scrapped by China Merchants & Engineers Inc., China.

== John Armstrong ==
John Armstrong was built by Todd Houston Shipbuilding Corporation. Her keel was laid on 3 December 1942. She was launched on 28 January 1943 and delivered on 12 February. Built for the WSA, she was operated under the management of Grace Line. She was scrapped at Mobile in July 1964.

== John A. Roebling ==
John A. Roebling was built by California Shipbuilding Corporation. Her keel was laid on 19 October 1943. She was launched on 13 November and delivered on 5 December. Built for the WSA, she was operated under the management of Mississippi Shipping Co. Sold in 1947 to Società Risorgamento, Genoa and renamed Grifone. Sold in 1959 to Marittima Capordoso. Operated under the management of Fratelli d'Amico. Renamed Settemari in 1961. She was scrapped at Trieste, Italy in February 1968.

== John A. Sutter ==
John A. Sutter was built by California Shipbuilding Corporation. Her keel was laid on 23 May 1942. She was launched on 10 July and delivered on 23 July. She was scrapped at Mobile in November 1968.

== John A. Treutlen ==
John A. Treutlen was built by Southeastern Shipbuilding Corporation, Savannah, Georgia. Her keel was laid on 5 February 1944. She was launched on 10 April and delivered on 17 April. Built for the WSA, she was operated under the management of South Atlantic Steamship Co. Torpedoed and damaged in the English Channel by U-984 on 29 June 1944. She was beached near Southampton. Declared a constructive total loss, she was scrapped at Briton Ferry, United Kingdom in September 1944.

== John Ball ==
John Ball was built by Oregon Shipbuilding Corporation. Her keel was laid on 29 October 1943. She was launched on 17 November and delivered on 28 November. She was scrapped at Portland, Oregon in June 1965.

== John Banvard ==
John Banvard was built by Bethlehem Fairfield Shipyard. Her keel was laid on 23 February 1943. She was launched on 27 March and delivered on 8 April. Built for the WSA, she was operated under the management of Seas Shipping Co. She was driven ashore in Praia Bay, Terceira Island, Azores on 31 October 1944 whilst on a voyage from the Hampton Roads, Virginia to Terceira Island. She was refloated and declared a constructive total loss. She departed for the United States on 27 December under tow of a United States Navy warship. She was towed to New York, then Jacksonville, Florida in July 1945. Reported dismantled in August 1945.

== John Barry ==
John Barry was built by Oregon Shipbuilding Corporation. Her keel was laid on 11 July 1941. She was launched on 23 November and delivered on 17 February 1942. Built for the WSA, she was operated under the management of Lykes Brothers Steamship Company. Torpedoed and sunk in the Indian Ocean (15°10′N 55°18′E) by U-859 on 28 August 1944 whilst on a voyage from Philadelphia to Bahrain.

== John Barton Payne ==
John Barton Payne was a tank transport built by J. A. Jones Construction Co., Panama City. Her keel was laid on 11 August 1943. She was launched on 23 October and delivered on 30 November. Laid up at Mobile post-war, she was scrapped at Panama city, Florida in March 1972.

== John Bartram ==
John Bartram was built by Permanente Metals Corporation. Her keel was laid on 10 September 1942. She was launched on 23 October and delivered on 31 October. Laid up at Beaumont post-war, she was scrapped at Brownsville, Texas in July 1972.

== John Bascom ==
John Bascom was built by J. A. Jones Construction Company, Panama City. Her keel was laid on 7 September 1942. She was launched on 31 March 1943 and delivered on 30 April. Built for the WSA, she was operated under the management of Moore-McCormack Steamship Co. Sunk during a German air raid on Bari, Italy on 2 December 1943. Her wreck was sold to Genoa shipbreakers in 1948.

== John B. Ashe ==
John B. Ashe was built by California Shipbuilding Corporation. Her keel was laid on 6 March 1942. She was launched on 16 May and delivered on 16 June. Built for the WSA, she as operated under the management of American-Hawaiian Steamship Company. To the United States War Department in 1946. Loaned to the Chinese Government. Renamed Hai Huang later that year and operated under the management of China Merchants Steam Navigation Company. Sold to the Chinese Government in 1947, then sold to her managers later that year. She was scrapped at Keelung, Taiwan in June 1962.

== John Bell ==
John Bell was built by Todd Houston Shipbuilding Corporation. Her keel was laid on 7 January 1943. She was launched on 24 February and delivered on 11 March. Built for the WSA, she was operated under the management of J. H. Winchester & Co. She was torpedoed and damaged in the Mediterranean Sea south of Sardinia, Italy (37°15′N 8°24′E) by U-410 on 26 August 1943 whilst on a voyage from Philadelphia to Bandar Shapur, Iran. She caught fire and exploded, sinking the next day.

== John B. Floyd ==
John B. Floyd was built by Permanente Metals Corporation. Her keel was laid on 9 October 1942. She was launched on 7 November and delivered on 20 November. She was scrapped at Terminal Island in January 1965.

== John B. Gordon ==
John B. Gordon was built by J. A. Jones Construction Company, Brunswick. Her keel was laid on 6 September 1943. She was launched on 16 November and delivered on 26 November. Built for the WSA, she was operated under the management of T. J. Stevenson & Co. She was scrapped at Baltimore in January 1961.

== John B. Hamilton ==
John B. Hamilton was built by Todd Houston Shipbuilding Corporation. Her keel was laid on 16 May 1944. She was launched on 19 June and delivered on 29 June. Laid up at Mobile post-war, she was scrapped at Panama City, Florida in August 1976.

== John B. Hood ==
John B. Hood was built by Todd Houston Shipbuilding Corporation. Her keel was laid on 5 October 1942. She was launched on 2 December and delivered on 19 December. She was scrapped at Wilmington, North Carolina in March 1965.

== John Bidwell ==
John Bidwell was built by California Shipbuilding Corporation. Her keel was laid on 14 November 1942. She was launched on 19 December and delivered on 31 December. She was scrapped at Philadelphia in August 1960. During her scrapping, 522 bags of mail dating from 1945 were discovered.

== John B. Kendrick ==
John B. Kendrick was built by Oregon Shipbuilding Corporation. Her keel was laid on 3 November 1943. She was launched on 22 November and delivered on 5 December. Built for the WSA, she was operated under the management of American Mail Line. Sold in 1947 to G. B. Bibolini, Genoa and renamed Pietro B. Renamed Pietro Bibolini in 1948. Sold in 1955 to Transoceana Genovese, Genoa. Sold in 1956 to Bibolini Società di Navigazione, Genoa. Sold in 1963 to First Steamship Co., Taipei, Taiwan and renamed Ever Protector. Reflagged to China. Reflagged to Taiwan in 1965. She was scrapped at Kaohsiung in May 1967.

== John Blair ==
John Blair was built by Permanente Metals Corporation. Her keel was laid on 1 September 1942. She was launched on 12 October and delivered on 31 October. She was scrapped at Oakland in April 1966.

== John B. Lennon ==
John B. Lennon was built by J. A. Jones Construction Company, Brunswick. Her keel was laid on 10 November 1943. She was launched on 22 December and delivered on 31 December. Built for the WSA, she was operated under the management of Smith & Johnson. To the French Government in 1946. Operated under the management of Société Nationale des Chemins de Fer Français. Renamed Strasbourg in 1947. Management transferred to Compagnie de Transports Oceaniques in 1948, then to Compagnie des Messageries Maritimes in 1955. Sold in 1959 to Mina Corp. and renamed Mantric. Reflagged to Lebanon and operated under the management of Wigham, Richardson & Co. She was scrapped at Onomichi, Japan in October 1968.

== John Branch ==
John Branch was built by North Carolina Shipbuilding Company, Wilmington, North Carolina. Her keel was laid on 25 July 1943. She was launched as John Branch on 21 August and delivered as Sambrian on 27 August. To the MoWT under Lend-Lease. Operated under the management of Cayzer, Irvine & Co. She lost her propeller on 31 August 1946 when departing Port Said, Egypt for Naples, Italy. She was towed in to Alexandria, Egypt on 4 September by the Liberty ship Saminver. A replacement propeller was obtained from the wreck of the Liberty ship Thomas G. Masaryk and fitted by flooding her forward holds, avoiding the need for a drydock. Management transferred to Frank C. Strick & Co. in 1947. Sold later that year to Clan Line Steamers Ltd. and renamed Clan Macfarlane. Operated under the management of Cayzer, Irvine & Co. Sold in 1961 to Vesta Marine Corp. and renamed Nicholas. Reflagged to Lebanon and operated under the management of Frinton Shipbrokers. Ran aground in a typhoon at Hachinoe, Japan on 10 October 1961 whilst on a voyage from Kamaishi, Japan to Vancouver. She was refloated on 27 October and towed in to Hachinoe. Declared a constructive total loss, she was scrapped at Yokosuka in 1962.

== John Burke ==
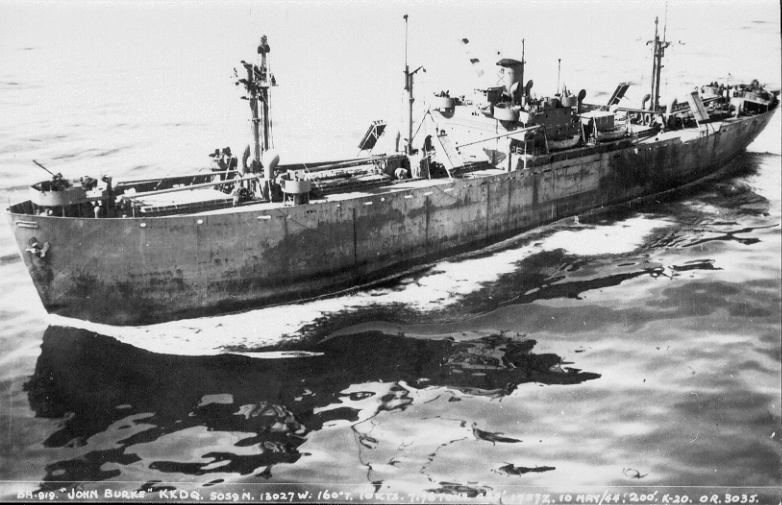
John Burke

John Burke was built by Oregon Shipbuilding Corporation. Her keel was laid on 20 November 1942. She was launched on 15 December and delivered on 23 December. Built for the WSA, she was operated under the management of Northland Transportation Co. She was sunk off Mindoro, Philippines by a Japanese kamikaze attack on 28 December 1944 whilst on a voyage from an American port to Mindoro.

=== John Burroughs ===
John Burroughs was built by California Shipbuilding Corporation. Her keel was laid on 17 April 1943. She was launched on 10 May and delivered on 23 May. She was scrapped at Tacoma in November 1962.

== John Cabot ==
John Cabot was built by Kaiser Company, Vancouver, Washington. She was delivered in January 1943. She was scrapped at Portland, Maine in December 1959.

== John C. Ainsworth ==
John C. Ainsworth was built by Oregon Shipbuilding Corporation. Her keel was laid on 16 June 1942. She was launched on 24 July and delivered on 5 August. She was scrapped at Seattle, Washington in February 1961.

== John Carroll ==
John Carroll was built by Permanente Metals Corporation. Her keel was laid on 30 April 1943. She was launched on 31 May and delivered on 18 June. Built for the WSA, she was operated under the management of American-Hawaiian Steamship Company. To the United States War Department in 1946. Sold in 1947 to Wallem & Co. A/S, Bergen, Norway and renamed Kronviken. Transferred to Wallem, Steckmest & Co. A/S, Bergen in 1958. Sold in 1959 to I/S Kronviken, Oslo. Operated under the management of Sigurd B. Sverdup. Sold in 1960 to Eie's Rederi A/S og D/S A/S Korsfjord, Bergen and renamed Solmar. Operated under the management of Bergh & Helland. Sold in 1963 to Namdal Shipping & Trading Co., Monrovia, Liberia and renamed Pomona. Sold in 1964 to Union Prosper Marine Corp., Monrovia and renamed Union Prosper. She was scrapped in Kaohsiung in June 1967.

== John Carter Rose ==
John Carter Rose was built by Bethlehem Fairfield Shipyard. Her keel was laid on 10 June 1942. She was launched on 31 July and delivered on 10 August. Built for the WSA, she was operated under the management of American-West African Line. She was torpedoed and damaged in the Caribbean Sea 850 nautical miles (1,570 km) west of Trinidad (10°27′N 45°37′W by U-201 on 8 October 1942 whilst on a voyage from New York to Accra, Gold Coast. She was later torpedoed, shelled and sunk by U-202.

== John Carver ==
John Carver was built by New England Shipbuilding Corporation. Her keel was laid on 14 July 1942. She was launched on 31 October and delivered on 21 November. She was built for the WSA. She suffered an explosion on 23 April 1945 whilst under repair at Philadelphia and sank. She was refloated and towed to Baltimore, where she was laid up. She was scrapped at Hoboken, New Jersey in 1949.

== John Catron ==
John Catron was built by J. A. Jones Construction Company, Brunswick. Her keel was laid on 3 September 1942. She was launched on 11 July 1943 and delivered on 31 July. Built for the WSA, she was operated under the management of American Foreign Steamship Corporation. Laid up at Beaumont post-war, she was scrapped at Brownsville in January 1972.

== John C. Breckinridge ==
John C. Breckinridge was built by Southeastern Shipbuilding Corporation. Her keel was laid on 27 January 1943. She was launched on 22 April and delivered on 22 May. She was scrapped at Baltimore in January 1960.

== John C. Calhoun ==
John C. Calhoun was built by North Carolina Shipbuilding Company. Her keel was laid on 1 October 1941. She was launched on 26 April 1942 and delivered on 21 May. She suffered an onboard explosion at Finschhafen, New Guinea on 7 September 1944 and was beached on Madan Island. She was refloated in February 1945 and towed to Mobile, then to Norfolk, Virginia. Declared a constructive total loss and laid up. She was scrapped in the United States in 1947.

== John C. Fremont ==
John C. Fremont was built by California Shipbuilding Corporation. Her keel was laid on 24 May 1941. She was launched on 27 September and delivered on 21 February 1942. Built for the WSA, she was operated under the management of American President Lines. She struck a mine in Manila Bay on 31 March 1945 whilst on a voyage from Leyte to Manila, Philippines. She was towed to Subic Bay and beached. Declared a constructive total loss, she was sold in 1948 to Asia Development Co., Shanghai, China for scrapping. Still laid up in 1952, presumed scrapped at a later date.

== John Chandler ==
John Chandler was built by New England Shipbuilding Corporation. Her keel was laid on 29 January 1943. She was launched on 8 April and delivered on 20 April. Built for the WSA, she was operated under the management of American Export Lines. To the French Government in 1947 and renamed Rochefort. Operated under the management of Delmas Vieljeux. Sold in 1970 to Laodice Shipping Co., Famagusta, Cyprus and renamed Ephimeron. She was scrapped at Kaohsiung in April 1971.

== John Chester Kendall ==
John Chester Kendall was built by New England Shipbuilding Corporation. Her keel was laid on 29 March 1944. She was launched on 9 May and delivered on 19 May. Laid up in the James River post-war, she was scrapped at Brownsville in January 1973.

== John Clarke ==
John Clarke was built by Walsh-Kaiser Company, Providence, Rhode Island. Her keel was laid on 11 July 1942. She was launched on 25 February 1943 and delivered on 12 April. She was scrapped at Panama City, Florida in May 1968.

== John Colter ==
John Colter was built by Permanente Metals Corporation. Her keel was laid on 2 August 1943. She was launched on 24 August and delivered on 2 September. Built for the WSA, she was operated under the management of Norton Lilly Management Co. To the French Government in 1946 and renamed Briancon. Operated under the management of Compagnie des Messagaries Maritimes. Sold in 1960 to Vita Shipping Corp. and renamed Zephyros. Reflagged to Lebanon and operated under the management of Transmarine Shipping Agencies. Sold in 1966 to Misisapa Navera, Panama and renamed Sailor Star, remaining under the Lebanese flag. She was scrapped at Shanghai in June 1967.

== John Constantine ==
John Constantine was built by Permanente Metals Corporation. Her keel was laid on 1 July 1943. She was launched on 28 July and delivered on 9 August. Built for the WSA, she was operated under the management of Isthmian Steamship Company. Sold in 1947 to Spyros A. Lemos, Chios, Greece and renamed Antonis. Operated under the management of Lemos & Pateras. Sold in 1959 to Compania Navigation Somelga, Panama and reflagged to Liberia, remaining under the same management. Sold in 1962 to Viasegura Compania Navigation, Panama and renamed Delis. Remaining under the Lebanese flag and operated under the management of Kulukundis. Sold in 1963 to Jayanti Shipping Co., Bombay, India and renamed Budha Jayanti. She was scrapped at Bombay in May 1966.

== John C. Preston ==
John C. Preston was built by Delta Shipbuilding Company. Her keel was laid on 12 December 1944. She was launched as John C. Preston on 23 January 1945 and delivered as Hydra on 9 February. To the Greek Government under Lend-Lease. Sold in 1946 to C. N. Michalos, Piraeus and renamed Costas Michalos. She ran aground on the Banc les Quenocs, in the English Channel off the coast of Pas-de-Calais, France on 26 October 1962 whilst on a voyage from Arkhangelsk, Soviet Union to Calais. She broke in two and sank on 19 November.

== John Cropper ==
John Cropper was built by North Carolina Shipbuilding Company. Her keel was laid on 20 January 1942. She was launched on 17 May and delivered on 4 June. She was scrapped at Portland, Oregon in November 1965.

== John C. Spencer ==
John C. Spencer was built by Todd Houston Shipbuilding Corporation. Her keel was laid on 13 January 1943. She was launched on 5 March and delivered on 17 March. She was scrapped at Baltimore in 1962.

== John Davenport ==
John Davenport was built by New England Shipbuilding Corporation. Her keel was laid on 24 September 1941. She was launched on 15 May 1942 and delivered on 30 June. She was scrapped at Philadelphia in July 1960.

== John Davey ==
John Davey was built by California Shipbuilding Corporation. Her keel was laid on 2 November 1943. She was launched on 28 November and delivered on 21 December. She was scrapped at Seattle in 1961.

== John Deere ==
John Deere was built by Oregon Shipbuilding Corporation. Her keel was laid on 25 September 1942. She was launched on 23 October and delivered on 31 October. She was scrapped in Hirao in March 1961.

== John Dickinson ==
John Dickinson was built by Oregon Shipbuilding Corporation. Her keel was laid on 29 December 1941. She was launched on 11 March 1942 and delivered on 21 April. Laid up in the James River post-war, she was sold to shipbreakers in Cleveland in January 1973.

== John Dockweiler ==
John Dockweiler was built by California Shipbuilding Corporation. Her keel was laid on 31 December 1943. She was launched on 29 January 1944 and delivered on 15 February. She was scrapped at Portland, Oregon in March 1970.

== John Drake Sloat ==
John Drake Sloat was built by California Shipbuilding Corporation. Her keel was laid on 17 December 1942. She was launched on 12 January 1943 and delivered on 28 January. She was scrapped at Terminal Island in August 1960.

== John Drayton ==
John Drayton was built by North Carolina Shipbuilding Company. Her keel was laid on 4 July 1942. She was launched on 5 September and delivered on 17 September. Built for the WSA, she was operated under the management of A. H. Bull & Co. Torpedoed and damaged in the Indian Ocean 300 nautical miles (560 km) south east of Durban, Union of South Africa (9°03′N 26°25′E) by Leonardo da Vinci on 21 April 1942 whilst on a voyage from Khorramshahr, Iran to Cape Town, Union of South Africa. She was shelled and sunk by Leonardo da Vinci.

== John Drew ==
John Drew was built by California Shipbuilding Corporation. Her keel was laid on 22 November 1943. She was launched on 19 December and delivered on 31 December. Built for the WSA, she was operated under the management of Sudden & Christensen. To the United States War Department in 1946. Sold in 1947 to Lyras & Lemnos Bros., London and renamed Michael. Reflagged to Greece. Sold in 1949 to Adamantos Steamship Co., Piraeus. Operated under the management of Triton Shipping Co. Sold in 1969 to Proteus Shipping Co., and renamed Korais, remaining under the same flag and management. Sold in 1966 to United Forward Marine Corp. and renamed United Forward. Reflagged to Liberia and operated under the management of United Forward Development Corp. She was scrapped at Kaohsiung in May 1967.

== John Einig ==
John Einig was built by St. Johns River Shipbuilding Company, Jacksonville, Florida. Her keel was laid on 1 December 1943. She was launched on 14 January 1944 and delivered on 31 January. Built for the WSA, she was operated under the management of Northland Transportation Co. Sold in 1947 to Achille Lauro, Naples and renamed Aida Lauro. She was scrapped at La Spezia, Italy in March 1969.

== John E. Schmeltzer ==
John E. Schmeltzer was built by Bethlehem Fairfield Shipyard. Her keel was laid on 13 April 1943. She was launched on 16 May and delivered on 26 May. She was driven ashore and wrecked on Santa Antão Island, Cape Verde Islands on 25 November 1947 whilst on a voyage from Rosario, Argentina to Gothenburg, Sweden.

== John E. Sweet ==
John E. Sweet was built by Southeastern Shipbuilding Corporation. Her keel was laid on 17 January 1944. She was launched on 3 March and delivered on 21 March. She was scrapped at Philadelphia in March 1965.

== John Evans ==
John Evans was built by Permanente Metals Corporation. Her keel was laid on 27 June 1943. She was launched on 18 July and delivered on 31 July. Built for the WSA, she was operated under the management of General Steamship Co. She was scrapped at Philadelphia in March 1961.

== John E. Ward ==
John E. Ward was built by Southeastern Shipbuilding Corporation. Her keel was laid on 13 October 1943. She was launched on 25 November and delivered on 7 December. Laid up in the Hudson River post-war, she was scrapped at Kearny in September 1970.

== John E. Wilkie ==
John E. Wilkie was built by Permanente Metals Corporation. Her keel was laid on 17 June 1943. She was launched as John E. Wilkie on 8 July and delivered as Sambridge on 20 July. Built for the MoWT, she was operated under the management of T. & J. Brocklebank Ltd. Torpedoed and sunk in the Arabian Sea (11°25′N 47°25′E) by I-27 on 18 November 1943 whilst on a voyage from Madras, India to an American port.

== John Fairfield ==
John Fairfield was built by New England Shipbuilding Corporation. Her keel was laud on 13 August 1943. She was launched on 10 October and delivered on 15 October. She was scrapped at Portland, Oregon in January 1968.

== John F. Appleby ==
John F. Appleby was built by Permanente Metals Corporation. Her keel was laid on 1 September 1942. She was launched on 18 October and delivered on 31 October. Laid up in the Hudson River post-war, she was scrapped at Kearny in July 1970.

== John F. Goucher ==
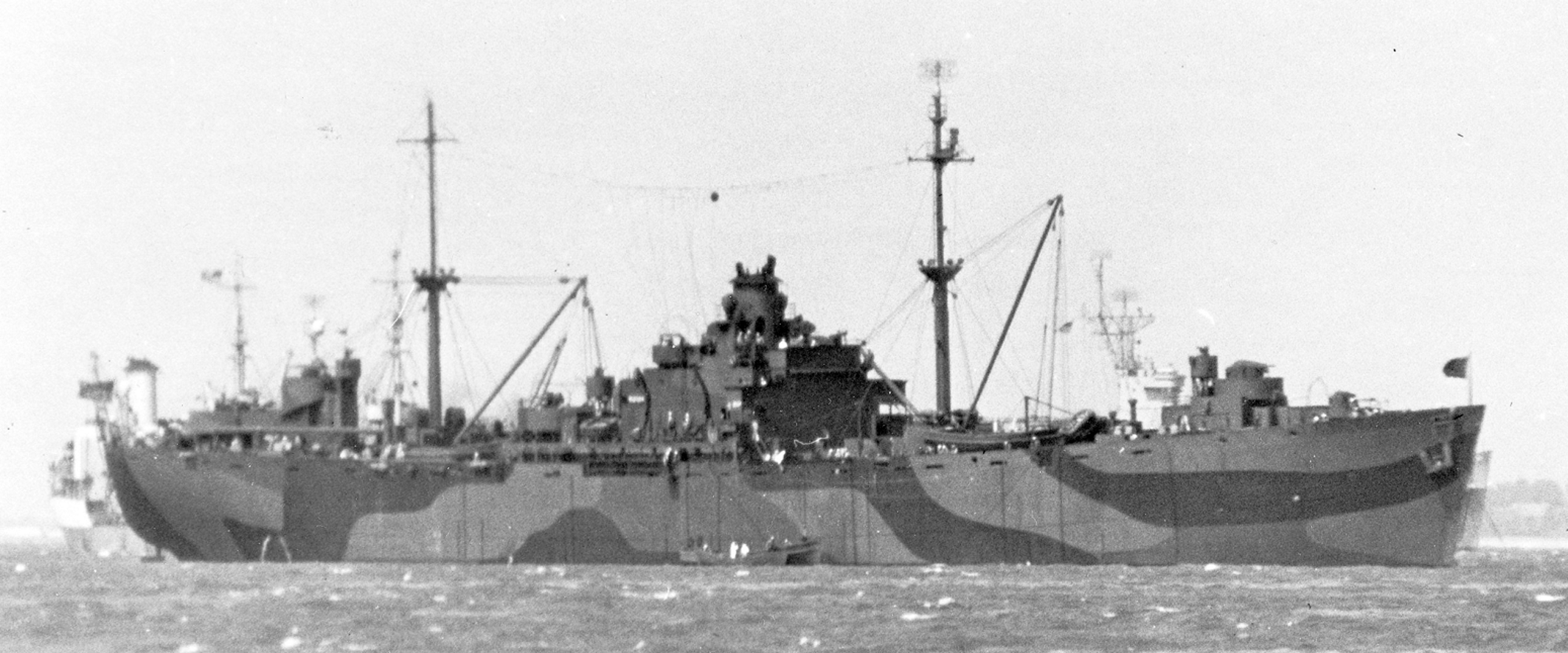
USS Culebra Island

John F. Goucher was built by Bethlehem Fairfield Shipyard. Her keel was launched on 29 October 1943. She was launched as John F. Goucher on 23 November and delivered to the United States Navy as Culebra Island on 29 November. Laid up in reserve at San Diego, California in November 1946. Subsequently transferred to the United States Maritime Commission (USMC). Renamed John F. Goucher and laid up in Suisun Bay. She was scrapped at Portland, Oregon in February 1974.

== John Fiske ==
John Fiske was built by California Shipbuilding Corporation. Her keel was laid on 16 May 1942. She was launched on 3 July and delivered on 25 July. Laid up in the Hudson River post-war, she was scrapped at Kearny in June 1971.

== John Fitch ==
John Fitch was built by Permanente Metals Corporation. Her keel was laid on 4 August 1942. She was launched on 28 August and delivered on 2 September. She was scrapped at Portland, Oregon in April 1967.

== John F. Myers ==
John F. Myers was built by Oregon Shipbuilding Corporation. Her keel was laid on 4 September 1943. She was launched on 19 September and delivered on 25 September. Built for the WSA, she was operated under the management of Alcoa Steamship Co. Sold in 1947 to Sigalas & Kulukundis, Piraeus and renamed Santorini. Operated under the management of Maritime Trade Corp. Sold in 1949 to C. G. Sigalas, Athens. Placed under the management of Nomikos Ltd. in 1957. Sold in 1965 to A. Nikoforos, Piraeus and renamed Captamihalis. She was scrapped at Bilbao, Spain in August 1969.

== John F. Shafroth ==
John F. Shafroth was built by Permanente Metals Corporation. Her keel was laid on 6 February 1944. She was launched on 25 February and delivered on 3 March. Laid up in Suisun Bay post-war. She was scuttled with a cargo of obsolete ammunition 47 nautical miles (87 km) west of the Golden Gate, California on 22 July 1964.

== John F. Steffen ==
John F. Steffen was built by Oregon Shipbuilding Corporation. Her keel was laid on 27 May 1943. She was launched on 15 June and delivered on 23 June. She was scrapped at Wilmington, North Carolina in November 1959.

== John Gallup ==
John Gallup was built by Bethlehem Fairfield Shipyard. Her keel was laid on 27 January 1943. She was launched on 3 March and delivered on 18 March. She was scrapped at Kearny in 1963.

== John G. Brady ==
John G. Brady was built by Oregon Shipbuilding Corporation. Her keel was laid on 13 September 1943. She was launched on 28 September and delivered on 4 October. She was scrapped at Baltimore in November 1960.

== John G. Carlisle ==
John G. Carlisle was built by Permanente Metals Corporation. Her keel was laid on 23 December 1942. She was launched on 23 January 1943 and delivered on 31 January. She was scrapped in the United States in 1965.

== John Gibbon ==
John Gibbon was built by Todd Houston Shipbuilding Corporation. Her keel was laid on 29 January 1944. She was launched on 10 March and delivered on 22 March. She was scrapped at Kearny in July 1968.

== John G. Nicolay ==
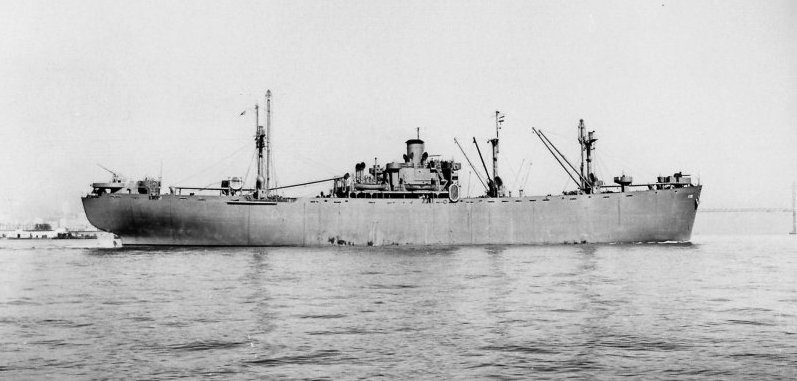
USS Albireo

John G. Nicolay was built by Permanente Metals Corporation. Her keel was laid on 17 January 1943. She was launched as John G. Nicolay on 25 February and delivered to the United States Navy as Albireo on 9 March. Returned to USMC in July 1946 and renamed John G. Nicolay. Laid up in the James River. Sold in 1947 to Southern Steamships Ltd., Johannesburg, Union of South Africa and renamed President Steyn. Sold in 1949 to Northern Steamships Ltd., Johannesburg. Sold in 1951 to Compania Navigation Hidalgo, Panama and renamed Hidalgo. Reflagged to Liberia and operated under the management of Southern Star Shipping Co. Sold in 1954 to Blue Bay Steamship Corp. and renamed Ocean Sailor. Remained under the Liberian flag and operated under the management of Jason Steamship Co. She was scrapped at Etajima, Japan in April 1967.

== John G. North ==
John G. North was built by Permanente Metals Corporation. Her keel was laid on 6 September 1943. She was launched as John G. North on 30 September and delivered as Samark on 8 October. To the MoWT under Lend-Lease. Operated under the management of Ellerman's Wilson Line. Returned to the USMC in 1947 and renamed John G. North. Laid up in the James River. She was scrapped at Philadelphia in 1960.

== John Goode ==
John Goode was a tanker built by California Shipbuilding Corporation. She was completed in September 1943. Built for the WSA, she was operated under the management of Los Angeles Tanker Operators Inc. Management transferred to American Pacific Steamship Co. in 1946. Laid up later that year. Sold in 1948 to World Wide Tankers Inc., Wilmington, Delaware. Sold in 1954 to San Rafael Compania Navigation, Panama and renamed Andriotis. Operated under the management of Orion Shipping & Trading Co. Converted to a cargo ship at Schiedam, Netherlands in 1955. Lengthened at Kure later that year. Now 511 feet 6 inches (155.91 m) and 8,394 GRT. Renamed Andros Patriot in 1957. Sold in 1960 to Mariners Transport Corp. and renamed Loudias. Reflagged to Greece, remaining under the same management. Reflagged to Liberia in 1963. Management transferred to Global Chartering & Brokerage Inc. in 1964. She was scrapped at Kaohsiung in June 1967.

== John Gorrie ==
John Gorrie was built by St. Johns River Shipbuilding Company. Her keel was laid on 29 August 1942. She was launched on 27 March 1943 and delivered on 24 May. She was scrapped at Portland, Oregon in September 1967.

== John Grier Hibben ==
John Grier Hibben was built by North Carolina Shipbuilding Company. Her keel was laid on 20 April 1943. She was launched on 15 May and delivered on 21 May. Built for the WSA, she was operated under the management of Seas Shipping Co. To the French Government in 1947 and renamed Belfort. Operated under the management of Chargeurs Réunis. Sold in 1967 to Compagnie Minière et Metallurgique, Casablanca, Morocco and renamed Kettara IX. Reflagged to Panama. She was scrapped at Yokosuka in June 1967.

== John G. Tod ==
John G. Tod was built by Todd Houston Shipbuilding Corporation. Her keel was laid on 1 December 1943. She was launched on 21 January 1944 and delivered on 31 January. Built for the WSA, she was operated under the management of International Freighting Corp. Sold in 1947 to Gamboa Steamship Co. and renamed Dorado. Reflagged to Panama and operated under the management of Lombardi & Icaza. Trapped in the Suez Canal during the Suez Crisis in 1956. Sold in 1960 to Glyfada Compania Navigation and renamed Glyfada. Remaining under the Panamanian flag and operated under the management of Embiricos Ltd. Sold in 1969 to Platres Navigation Co., Famagusta and renamed Platres. She was scrapped at Istanbul in June 1972.

== John G. Whittier ==
John G. Whittier was built by Oregon Shipbuilding Corporation. Her keel was laid on 8 February 1942. She was launched on 5 April and delivered on 4 May. She was scrapped at Philadelphia in 1962.

== John Hancock ==
John Hancock was built by Oregon Shipbuilding Corporation. Her keel was laid on 18 July 1941. She was launched on 14 December and delivered on 28 February 1942. Built for the WSA, she was operated under the management of Lykes Brothers Steamship Company. Torpedoed and sunk in the Caribbean Sea 95 nautical miles (176 km) wast of Havana, Cuba (19°41′N 76°50′W) by U-553) on 18 August 1942 whilst on a voyage from Honolulu to Philadelphia.

== John Hanson ==
John Hanson was built by Bethlehem Fairfield Shipyard. Her keel was laid on 21 August 1944. She was launched on 21 September and delivered on 7 October. Built for the WSA, she was operated under the management of A. L. Burbank & Co. Sold in 1948 to White Range Steamship Co. Operated under the management of Bistis Shipping Corp. Sold in 1952 to Dover Steamship Corp., New York and renamed Liberty F. Sold in 1956 to Marine Navigation Co., New York and renamed Marine Ranger. Operated under the management of Marine Transport Lines. She was scrapped at Avilés, Spain in January 1965.

== John Hart ==
John Hart was built by Oregon Shipbuilding Corporation. Her keel was laid on 16 December 1941. She was launched on 25 February 1942 and delivered on 15 April. She was scrapped at Tacoma in 1966.

== John Harvard ==
John Harvard was a limited troop carrier built by Oregon Shipbuilding Corporation. Her keel was laid on 27 April 1942. She was launched on 4 June and delivered on 20 June. Built for the WSA, she was operated under the management of American-Hawaiian Steamship Co. To the French Government in 1947 and renamed Bernières. Operated under the management of Compagnie Générale Transatlantique. Management transferred to Société Navigation Vieljeux-Delmas in 1954. She ran aground in the Vridi Canal on 21 April 1963 whilst on a voyage from Sassandra, Ivory Coast to La Pallice. She was refloated and declared a constructive total loss. She was scrapped at Hendrik-Ido-Ambacht, Netherlands in 1963.

== John Harvey ==
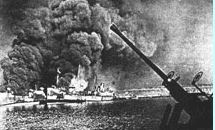
John Harvey on fire at Bari, 2 December 1943

John Harvey was built by North Carolina Shipbuilding Corporation. Her keel was laid on 6 December 1942. She was launched on 9 January 1943 and delivered on 19 January. Built for the WSA, she was operated under the management of Agwilines Inc. She was bombed and sunk in an air raid on Bari on 2 December 1943. Her wreck was sold to Genoa shipbreakers in 1948,

== John Hathorn ==
John Hathorn was built by California Shipbuilding Corporation. Her keel was laid on 12 February 1942. She was launched on 30 April and delivered on 6 June. Laid up at Beaumont post-war, she was scrapped at Brownsville in September 1972.

== John Hay ==
John Hay was built by J. A. Jones Construction Company, Panama City. Her keel was laid on 5 January 1943. She was launched on 31 May and delivered on 30 June. She was scrapped at Seattle in February 1961.

== John H. B. Latrobe ==
John H. B. Latrobe was built by Bethlehem Fairfield Shipyard. Her keel was laid on 19 May 1942. She was launched on 13 July and delivered on 28 July. Laid up in Suisun Bay post-war, she was scrapped at Portland, Oregon in June 1969.

== John H. Couch ==
John H. Couch was built by Oregon Shipbuilding Corporation. Her keel was laid on 13 March 1943. She was launched on 1 April and delivered on 9 April. Built for the WSA, she was operated under the management of Weyerhauser Co. Torpedoed and damaged by Japanese aircraft off Kola Point, Guadalcanal, Solomon Islands (9°38′S 160°00′E) on 11 October 1943 whilst on a voyage from San Francisco to Guadalcanal. She was set afire and burnt for two days. Beached at Kola Point, she capsized and sank.

== John H. Eaton ==
John H. Eaton was built by Todd Houston Shipbuilding Corporation. Her keel was laid on 22 December 1942. She was launched on 15 February 1943 and delivered on 28 February. Built for the WSA, she was operated under the management of Parry Navigation Co. Sold in 1946 to Compania Maritima Hari and renamed Myriam. Reflagged to Honduras and operated under the management of Thomas L. Standley & Sons. Management transferred to Simpson, Spence & Young in 1953, then to Maritime Agencies Ltd. in 1954. Sold in 1957 to Taiwan Navigation Co., Taipei, Taiwan and renamed New Kaohsiung. Reflagged to China. Reflagged to Taiwan in 1965. She was scrapped at Kaohsiung in March 1968.

== John Henry ==
John Henry was built by Bethlehem Fairfield Shipyard. Her keel was laid on 14 April 1942. She was launched on 18 June and delivered on 6 July. Laid up in the James River post war, she was scrapped at Castellón de la Plana in December 1972.

== John H. Hammond ==
John H. Hammond was built by J. A. Jones Construction Company, Brunswick. Her keel was laid on 13 October 1944. She was launched on 15 November and delivered on 27 November. Built for the WSA, she was operated under the management of William J. Rountree Co. She struck a mine and was damaged off Elba, Italy on 17 July 1945 whilst on a voyage from Baltimore to Livorno, Italy She was towed in to Piombino on 23 July and subsequently towed to Naples. Declared a constructive total loss, she was scrapped at Savona, Italy in July 1948.

== John H. Hatton ==
John H. Hatton was built by Bethlehem Fairfield Shipyard. Her keel was laid on 5 August 1943. She was launched as John H. Hatton on 30 August and delivered as Samora on 7 September. Renamed Sampenn. To the MoWT and operated under the management of Cayzer, Irvine & Co. Management transferred to C. Strubin & Co. in 1946. Returned to USMC in 1948 and laid up at Beaumont. She was scrapped at New Orleans in September 1966.

== John H. Marion ==
John H. Marion was a tanker built by California Shipbuilding Corporation. She was delivered in November 1943. Built for the WSA, she was operated under the management of Pacific Tankers Corp. Sold in 1948 to United States Waterways Corp., New York. She was converted to a cargo ship at Newport News in 1949. Now 7,208 GRT. Sold in 1952 to Compass Steamship Corp., New York and renamed Compass. Operated under the management of Paular Maritime Co. Renamed Mary P. in 1955 and reflagged to Liberia. Sold in 1957 to Panoras Shipping Corp. and renamed P. Prekla. Remaining under the Liberian flag and operated under the management of Epiphany Tankers Corp. Sold in 1961 to Perdika Shipping and Trading Corp and renamed Perdika. Remaining under the same flag and managers. Sold in 1967 to Commodity Traders Corp. and renamed Nebraskan. Remaining under the Liberian flag and operated under the management of Trans-Ocean Steamship Agency. She was scrapped at Hirao in December 1967.

== John H. McIntosh ==
John H. McIntosh was built by St. Johns River Shipbuilding Corporation. Her keel was laid on 16 August 1944. She was launched on 23 September and delivered on 30 September. Laid up in the Hudson River post-war, she was scrapped at Santander, Spain in November 1970.

== John H. Murphy ==
John H. Murphy was built by Bethlehem Fairfield Shipyard. Her keel was laid on 26 February 1944. She was launched on 29 March and delivered on 10 April. Built for the WSA, she was operated under the management of States Marine Corp., New York. Sold to her managers in 1946 and renamed Old Dominion State. Sold in 1954 to United Steamship Corp. and renamed Henry Ullman. Reflagged to Panama and operated under the management of Arrow Steamship Co. Sold in 1957 to Omnium Transportation Corp. and renamed Omnium Explorer. Reflagged to Liberia and operated under the management of Omnium Agencies Co. Sold in 1958 to Pacific World Corp. and renamed Pacific Explorer. Reflagged to the United States and operated under the management of Ocean Carrier Corp. Sold in 1960 to Mount Wilson Steamship Co. and renamed Mount McKinley. Operated under the management of Suwannee Steamship Corp. Lengthened at Tokyo in 1962. Now 511 feet 6 inches (155.91 m) long and 8,584 GRT. Sold in 1963 to Gloria Steamship Co. and renamed Volusia. Remaining under the same flag and management. Sold in 1964 to Piggly Wiggly Acceptance Corp., Wilmington, Delaware. She was scrapped at Hong Kong in November 1969.

== John Holmes ==
John Holmes was built by New England Shipbuilding Corporation. Her keel was laid on 12 February 1943. She was launched on 18 April and delivered on 28 April. Built for the WSA, she was operated under the management of A. L. Burbank & Co. Transferred to the United States Department of Commerce in 1946. Sold in October 1947 to Rederi A/S Nidaros, Oslo and renamed Nidarholm. Operated under the management of A/S Krogstad Shipping Agencies Ltd. Sold in 1949 to Skibs A/S Karaibien, Oslo. Operated the management of Gørrissen & Klaveness A/S. Renamed Tista in 1950. Sold in 1952 to Korea Shipping Corp., Pusan South Korea, and renamed Suhae Ho. Renamed Suhae in 1956. Sold in the 4th quarter of 1968 to Tong Il Steel Co. Ltd., Pusan for breaking. She was scrapped in January 1969.

== John Hope ==
John Hope was built by Permanente Metals Corporation. Her keel was laid on 12 January 1944. She was launched on 30 January and delivered on 7 February. Built for the WSA, she was operated under the management of Alaska Steamship Co. Sold in 1947 to Carlo Martinolich & Figlio, Trieste and renamed Tergeste. Sold in 1959 to Jugoslavenska Tankerska Plovidba, Zadar, Yugoslavia and renamed Ravni Kotari. She was scrapped at Hirao in July 1967.

== John Howard Payne ==
John Howard Payne was built by Permanente Metals Corporation. Her keel was laid on 15 July 1942. She was launched on 31 August and delivered on 30 September. She was scrapped at Baltimore in June 1963.

== John Howland ==
John Howland was a limited troop carrier built by Bethlehem Fairfield Shipyard. Her keel was laid on 15 February 1943. She was launched on 19 March and delivered on 31 March. Built for the WSA, she was operated under the management of American President Lines. Laid up at Beaumont, Texas in 1947. Sold in 1951 to Alliance Steamship Corp., New York. Sold in 1954 to Seafarer SA, Panama and renamed Galloway. Reflagged to Liberia and operated under the management of Overseas Navigation Corp. Sold inn 1959 to New England Industries Inc. Reflagged to the United States, remaining under the same management. Sold in 1961 to Chinese Maritime Trust, Taipei and renamed Kin Yung. Reflagged to China. Reflagged to Taiwan in 1965. She was scrapped at Kaohsiung in July 1968.

== John H. Quick ==
John H. Quick was built by California Shipbuilding Corporation. Her keel was laid on 16 November 1943. She was launched on 13 December and delivered on 31 December. She was scrapped at Portland, Oregon in November 1969.

== John H. Reagan ==
John H. Reagan was built by Todd Houston Shipbuilding Corporation. Her keel was laid on 21 June 1943. She was launched on 6 August and delivered on 20 August. She was scrapped at Kearny in April 1967.

== John H. Rosseter ==
John H. Rosseter was built by Permanente Metals Corporation. Her keel was laid on 2 June 1943. She was launched on 24 June and delivered on 6 July. She was scrapped at Tacoma in October 1966.

== John H. Thomas ==
John H. Thomas was built by Permanente Metals Corporation. Her keel was laid on 18 January 1944. She was launched on 5 February and delivered on 12 February. Built for the WSA, she was operated under the management of United States Lines. Sold in 1947 to Ruggiero & Merego Società Anonyme di Navigazione, Genoa and renamed Santa Rita. Sold in 1950 to Santa RitaSocietà di Navigazione, Genoa. Sold in 1962 to Plamar SA, Panama and renamed Alborada. Reflagged to Liberia and operated under the management of Olympic Maritime SA. She was scrapped at Vado Ligure, Italy in May 1970.

== John I. Nolan ==
John I. Nolan was built by Oregon Shipbuilding Corporation. Her keel was laid on 21 August 1943. She was launched on 6 September and delivered on 13 September. She struck a reef in the Pacific Ocean in 1947 and was severely damaged. Declared a constructive total loss, she was laid up in Suisun Bay. She was scrapped at Oakland in April 1949.

== John Ireland ==
John Ireland was built by Todd Houston Shipbuilding Corporation. Her keel was laid on 23 February 1944. She was launched on 30 March and delivered on 12 April. She was scrapped at New Orleans in March 1967.

== John Isaacson ==
John Isaacson was built by Permanente Metals Corporation. Her keel was laid on 17 February 1944. She was launched on 24 March and delivered on 25 April. Laid up at Mobile post-war, she was scrapped at Panama City, Florida in July 1970.

== John J. Abel ==
John J. Abel was built by Bethlehem Fairfield Shipyard. Her keel was laid on 20 February 1943. She was launched on 24 March and delivered on 3 April. She was scrapped at Hamburg in March 1961.

== John Jacob Astor ==
John Jacob Astor was built by Oregon Shipbuilding Company. Her keel was laid on 16 July 1943. She was launched on 5 August and delivered on 12 August. Built for the WSA, she was operated under the management of United States Lines. Sold in 1947 to Scindia Steam Navigation Co., Bombay and renamed Jalakanya. Operated under the management of Narottam Nararjee & Co. Sold in 1957 to Kamal Shipping Co., Bombay. Operated under the management of her former owner. She was scrapped at Bombay in January 1963.

== John James Audubon ==
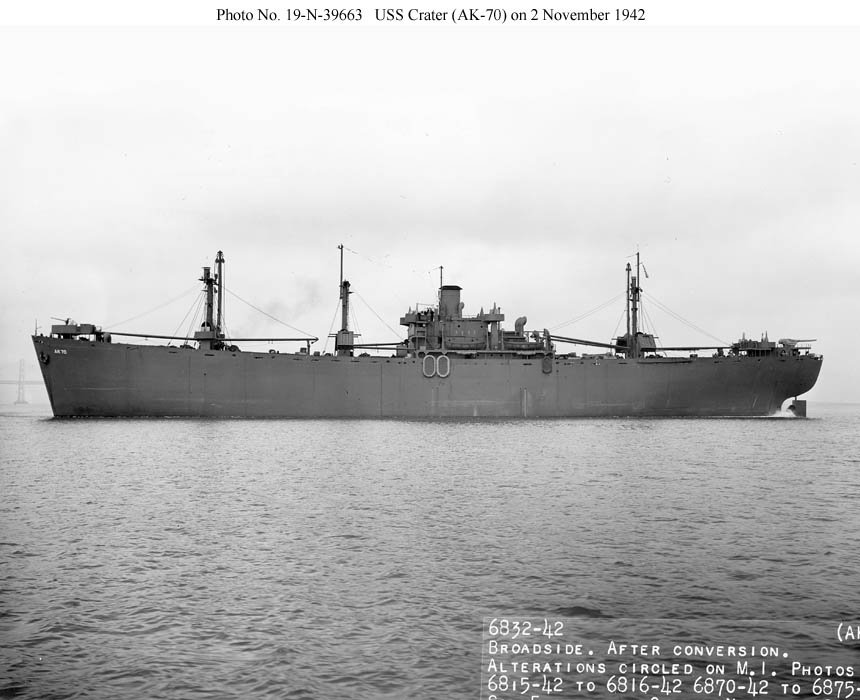
USS Crater

John James Audubon was built by Permanente Metals Corporation. Her keel was laid on 28 August 1942. She was launched as John James Audubon on 8 October and delivered to the United States Navy as Crater on 19 October. Returned to USMC in June 1942 and renamed John James Audubon. Laid up in reserve at Suisun Bay. Reported to have been sold to South Korean shipbreakers in 1974, but was scrapped in the United States in March 1975.

== John Jay ==
John Jay was built by Oregon Shipbuilding Corporation. Her keel was laid on 30 September 1941. She was launched on 4 February 1942 and delivered on 30 March. Laid up at Wilmington, North Carolina in November 1947. She was scrapped at Troon, United Kingdom in May 1960.

== John J. Crittenden ==
John J. Crittenden was built by St. Johns River Shipbuilding Company. Her keel was laid on 15 October 1942. She was launched on 7 May 1943 and delivered on 24 June. She was sold in March 1968 for scrapping at Mobile.

== John J. Ingalls ==
John J. Ingalls was built by California Shipbuilding Corporation. Her keel was laid on 12 June 1943. She was launched as John J. Ingalls on 8 July and delivered as Samson on 20 July. To the MoWT, operated under the management of Cunard White Star Line. Returned to USMC in 1948. Officially renamed John J. Ingalls and laid up at Beaumont as Samson. She was scrapped at Orange, Texas in June 1961.

== John J. McGraw ==
John J. McGraw was built by Bethlehem Fairfield Shipyard. Her keel was laid on 28 August 1943. She was launched as John J. McGraw on 22 September and delivered as Samariz on 1 October. To the MoWT and renamed John J. McGraw. Operated under the management of Lamport & Holt Line, Liverpool. Sold to her managers in 1947 and renamed Lassell. Sold in 1962 to Poseidon Compania Navigation, Panama and renamed Aiolos II. Operated under the management of Transmarine Shipping Agency. She ran aground off Cloughey, United Kingdom on 9 August 1952. Sold in 1967 to Falcon Shipping Co. and reflagged to Cyprus, remaining under the same management. She was scrapped at Shanghai in December 1968.

== John La Farge ==
John La Farge was built by Bethlehem Fairfield Shipyard. Her keel was laid on 16 October 1943. She was launched on 12 November and delivered on 19 November. Built for the WSA, she was operated under the management of American Liberty Steamship Co. Management transferred to Waterman Steamship Corp. in 1947. Sold in 1949 to Ocean Tramp Carriers Inc., New York and renamed Ocean Mariner. Sold in 1951 to Seafarer Steamship Corp. and renamed Sealife. Operated under the management of Orion Shipping & Trading Co. Sold in 1954 to Marineros Società Armamente, Panama and reflagged to Liberia, remaining under the same management. Sold in 1957 to Transmarine Navigation Inc. and renamed Andros Lion, remaining under the same flag and management. Management transferred to Maritime Overseas Corp. in 1960. Sold in 1963 to Caroline Navigation Inc. and renamed San Lorenzo. Remaining under the Liberian flag and operated under the management of Ceres Shipping Co. She was scrapped at Tokuyama, Japan in April 1968.

== John Langdon ==
John Langdon was built by California Shipbuilding Corporation. Her keel was laid on 14 January 1942. She was launched on 14 April and delivered on 20 June. Built for the WSA, she was operated under the management of Moore-McCormack Lines. To the Soviet Union under Lend-Lease in 1944 and renamed Tbilisi. She was scrapped in the Soviet Union in 1977.

== John Laurance ==
John Laurance was built by Todd Houston Shipbuilding Corporation. Her keel was laid on 13 July 1942. She was launched on 18 September and delivered on 8 October. She was scrapped at Panama City, Florida in July 1963.

== John Lawson ==
John Lawson was a limited troop carrier built by North Carolina Shipbuilding Company. Her keel was laid on 26 May 1943. She was launched on 24 June and delivered on 30 June. Built for the WSA, she was operated under the management of South Atlantic Steamship Line. To the French Government in 1946. Operated under the management of Compagnie Générale Transatlantique. Renamed Beauvais in 1947. Management transferred to Compagnie des Messageries Maritimes in 1950, then to Compagnie Nantaise de Chargeurs de l'Ouest in 1961. Converted to a liquified gas carrier at Nantes in 1962. Now 7,235 GRT. Sold in 1967 to S.A. Monagasque d'Armaments et de Navigation, Monaco. She was scrapped at Castellón de la Plana in May 1967.

== John L. Elliott ==
John L. Elliott was built by Bethlehem Fairfield Shipyard. Her keel was laid on 19 January 1944. She was launched on 19 February and delivered on 1 March. Built for the WSA, she was operated under the management of Stockard Steamship Corp. Sold in 1946 to American Shipping & Transport Corp., Panama. Sold in 1947 to Marian Navigation Co., Panama and renamed Sea King. Operated under the management of her former owner. Sold in 1948 to Scindia Steam Navigation Co. and renamed Jalamanjari. Reflagged to the United Kingdom and operated under the management of Narottam Mararjee & Co. Re-registered to India in 1957. She ran aground at Hartlepool, United Kingdom on 14 March 1964. She was refloated the next day. She was scrapped at Bombay in May 1963.

== John Lind ==
John Lind was built by Permanente Metals Corporation. Her keel was laid on 21 May 1943. She was launched on 11 June and delivered on 23 June. Built for the WSA, she was operated under the management of American Mail Line Ltd. Management transferred to American Foreign Steamship Corp. in 1946. Laid up in 1949. To USMC in 1951, operated under the management of Isthmian Steamship Co. Laid up in the James River in 1953. To United States Department of Commerce in 1965. She was scrapped at Castellón de la Plana in March 1972.

== John L. McCarley ==
John L. McCarley was a boxed aircraft transport built by J. A. Jones Construction Company, Panama City. Her keel was laid on 10 January 1945. She was launched on 14 February and delivered on 27 February. Laid up at Mobile post-war, she was scrapped at Mobile in July 1972.

== John L. Motley ==
John L. Motley was built by Bethlehem Fairfield Shipyard. Her keel was laid on 16 April 1943. She was launched on 18 May and delivered on 27 May. Built for the WSA, she was operated under the management of American Export Lines. Bombed, exploded and sunk in an air raid on Bari on 2 December 1943.

== John L. Stoddard ==
John L. Stoddard was built by Permanente Metals Corporation. Her keel was laid on 27 October 1943. She was launched on 15 November and delivered on 23 November. Built for the WSA, she was operated under the management of Burns Steamship Co. To the United States War Department in 1946. Sold in 1947 to D. Inglessi Fils SA. Navigation de Samos, Piraeus and renamed Samos. Placed under the management of Frinton Shipbrokers in 1952. Management transferred to Pegasus Ocean Services in 1964. She was scrapped at Hsinkang, China in June 1967.

== John L. Sullivan ==
John L. Sullivan was built by Permanente Metals Corporation. Her keel was laid on 2 May 1943. She was launched on 26 May and delivered on 7 June. To the United States Navy in 1957, converted to an experimental mine detection ship. Unnamed, but given the Pennant number YAG-37. Scrapped at Wilmington, North Carolina in 1958.

== John Marshall ==
John Marshall was built by Alabama Drydock Company. She was delivered on 31 May 1942. Ran aground 3 nautical miles (5.6 km) south of Portpatrick, United Kingdom on 5 January 1943. Refloated on 7 January and towed into the Clyde for repairs. To the United States Navy in December 1955. Laid up in the Hudson River, she was scrapped at Bilbao in February 1971.

== John Martin Miller ==
John Martin Miller was built by Todd Houston Shipbuilding Corporation. Her keel was laid on 14 December 1944. She was launched on 19 January 1945 and delivered on 31 January. Laid up at Beaumont post-war, she was scrapped at Brownsville in May 1971.

== John Mary Odin ==
John Mary Odin was built by Todd Houston Shipbuilding Corporation. Her keel was laid on 5 May 1943. She was launched on 15 June and delivered on 29 June. She was scrapped at Panama City, Florida in May 1961.

== John Mason ==
John Mason was built by New England Shipbuilding Corporation. Her keel was laid on 24 June 1943. She was launched on 12 August and delivered on 31 August. Built for the WSA, she was operated under the management of Sprague Steamship Co. Sold in 1947 to Tankers Corp. and renamed Vidkal. Reflagged to Panama and operated under the management of Johan Rasmussen. sold in 1948 to North Pacific Maritime Co., New York and renamed Matheos. Reflagged to Honduras. Sold in 1965 to Four Seasons Maritime Corp., Taipei and renamed Fosming. Reflagged to China. Ran aground on Castle Island, Bahamas (22°06′N 74°19′W) on 3 November 1965 whilst on a voyage from a Japanese port to Philadelphia. She was refloated on 8 November and towed to Philadelphia, where she was declared a constructive total loss. She was scrapped at Valencia, Spain in March 1966.

== John M. Bozeman ==
John M. Bozeman was built by Oregon Shipbuilding Corporation. Her keel was laid on 6 September 1943. She was launched on 21 September and delivered on 28 September. Laid up in the James River post-war, she was sold to shipbreakers in New York in December 1972.

== John M. Brooke ==
John M. Brooke was built by J. A. Jones Construction Company, Panama City. Her keel was laid on 30 December 1943. She was launched on 24 February 1944 and delivered on 30 March. Built for the WSA, she was operated under the management of North Atlantic & Gulf Steamship Co. Sold in 1947 to John S. Coumantaros, Piraeus and renamed Stavros Coumantaros. Operated under the management of Union Maritime & Shipping Co. Management transferred to Southern Steamships Ltd in 1958. Sold in 1960 to Maritime Co. Spetsai, Panama and renamed Spetsai. Remaining under the Greek flag and operated under the management of Southern Star Shipping Co. She was scrapped at Kaohsiung in April 1968.

== John McDonogh ==

John McDonogh was built by Delta Shipbuilding Company. Her keel was laid on 11 May 1943. She was launched on 16 June and delivered on 6 July. Built for the WSA, she was operated under the management of Waterman Steamship Corp. Management transferred to Polarus Steamship Co., New York in 1946. Sold in 1951 to Metro Steamship Corp., New York and renamed Gulfwater. This sale was illegal as Metro Steamship Corp. and its parent company, Metro Petroleum Shipping Company were under the control of Greek nationals. The law only allowed the sale of surplus ships to American citizens. Sold in 1956 to Estela Compania Navigation SA, Panama. Operated under the management of Mar-Trade Corp. Management transferred to Cargo & Tankship Management Corp. in 1958. Sold in 1959 to Metro Petroleum Shipping Co. Reflagged to the United States and operated under the management of Mar-Trade Corp. Sold in 1961 to Estela Compania Navigatio SA and renamed Orsa. Reflagged to Greece and operated under the management of Marine Managers Inc. Sold in 1963 to Notly Steamships Inc. and renamed Kimisis. Reflagged to Liberia and operated under the management of Apollo Shipping Inc. She was scrapped at Kaohsiung in May 1969.

== John McKinley ==
John McKinley was built by J. A. Jones Construction Company, Brunswick. Her keel was laid on 23 March 1943. She was launched on 31 July and delivered on 20 August. Built for the WSA, she was operated under the management of Dichmann, Wright & Pugh. She was scrapped at Richmond in 1967.

== John M. Clayton ==
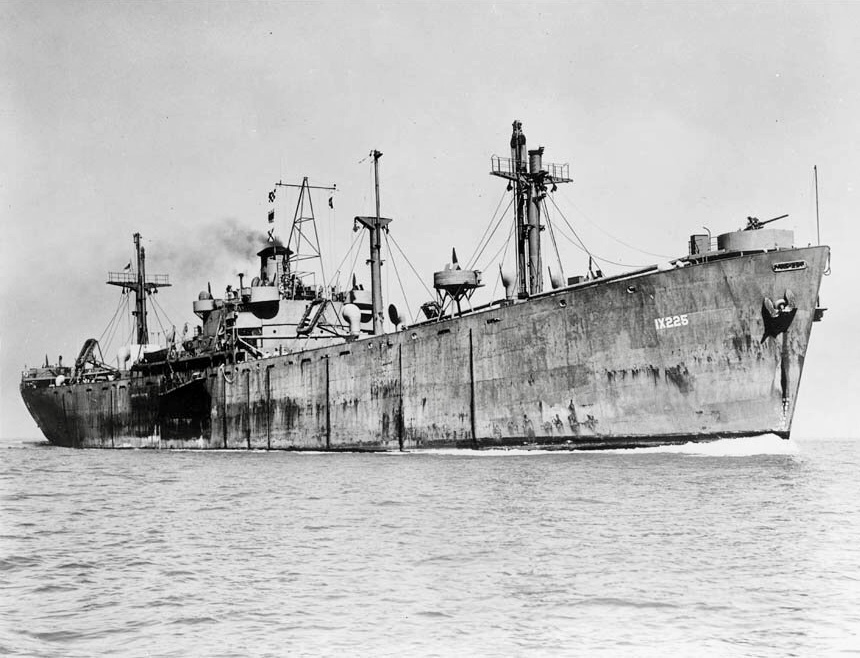
USS Harcourt

John M. Clayton was built by California Shipbuilding Corporation. Her keel was laid on 23 November 1943. She was launched on 27 December, and delivered on 8 January 1943. Built for the WSA, she was operated under the management of American-Hawaiian Steamship Company. Bombed and damaged by Japanese aircraft at Mindoro, on 2 January 1945, and was beached. Subsequently refloated and towed to Leyte, then Pearl Harbor, Hawaii, where she was repaired. To the United States Navy and commissioned in June 1945, as Harcourt (IX-225). Returned to WSA in May 1946 and renamed John M. Clayton. Laid up in Suisun Bay. She was scrapped in Portland, Oregon, in November 1962.

== John McLean ==
John McLean was built by Permanente Metals Corporation. Her keel was laid on 14 September 1942. She was launched on 23 October and delivered on 7 November. Built for the WSA, she was operated under the management of W. R. Chamberlin & Co. To the French Government in 1947 and renamed Brest. Operated under the management of Compagnie Générale Transatlantique. Management transferred to Compagnie des Messageries Maritimes in 1950. Sold in 1960 to Patt, Manfield & Co., Hong Kong and renamed Galaxy. Reflagged to Panama. Sold in 1968 to Compania Elios Navigation, Panama & Hong Kong, remaining under the Panamanian flag. She was scrapped at Kaohsiung in July 1970.

== John McLoughlin ==
John McLoughlin was built by Oregon Shipbuilding Corporation. Her keel was laid on 22 May 1942. She was launched on 4 July and delivered on 17 July. Laid up at Mobile post-war, she was scrapped at Panama City, Florida in April 1971.

== John Merrick ==
John Merrick was built by North Carolina Shipbuilding Company. Her keel was laid on 12 June 1943. She was launched on 11 July and delivered on 18 July. She was scrapped at Terminal Island in 1967.

== John M. Harlan ==
John M. Harlan was built by J. A. Jones Construction Company, Brunswick. Her keel was laid on 5 May 1943. She was launched on 29 August and delivered on 16 September. Built for the WSA, she was operated under the management of Moore-McCormack Lines. She was scrapped at New Orleans in June 1966.

== John Milledge ==
John Milledge was built by Southeastern Shipbuilding Corporation. Her keel was laid on 27 June 1942. She was launched on 21 February 1943 and delivered on 19 April. She was scrapped in the United States in 1965.

== John Miller ==
John Miller was built by St. Johns River Shipbuilding Company. Her keel was laid on 7 December 1944. She was launched on 15 January 1945 and delivered on 25 January. Built for the WSA, she was laid up at Beaumont post-war. She was scrapped at Brownsville in March 1971.

== John Minto ==
John Minto was built by Oregon Shipbuilding Corporation. Her keel was laid on 9 May 1943. She was launched on 28 May and delivered on 5 June. To the Soviet Union under Lend-Lease and renamed Vitebsk. Sold to Japanese shipbreakers in 1971 and renamed John Mint. She was resold, and scrapped at Kaohsiung in July 1972.

== John Mitchell ==
John Mitchell was built by Bethlehem Fairfield Shipyard. Her keel was laid on 23 July 1942. She was launched on 7 September and delivered on 16 September. She was scrapped in New Orleans in May 1967.

== John M. Morehead ==
John M. Morehead was a limited troop carrier built by North Carolina Shipbuilding Company. Her keel was laid on 5 May 1943. She was launched on 29 May and delivered on 4 June. Built for the WSA, she was operated under the management of Moore-McCormack Lines. Sold in 1947 to Waterman Steamship Corp., New York and renamed Governor Comer. Sold in 1949 to Polarus Steamship Co. and renamed Polarus Sailor. Sold in 1951 to Drytrans Inc., New York and renamed Albion. Sold in 1956 to Arrow Barge Co., New York and renamed Joseph Feuer. Sold in 1958 to Long, Quinn & Boylan Co., New York and renamed Anne Quinn. Sold in 1961 to Amerind Shipping Co., New York. Sold in 1962 to Earl J. Smith & Co., New York. Sold in 1965 to Carlton Shipping Co. and renamed Brazos Trader. Reflagged to Liberia and operated under the management of Ship Services Ltd. She was scrapped at Bilbao in June 1966.

== John Morgan ==
John Morgan was built by Bethlehem Fairfield Shipyard. Her keel was laid on 31 March 1943. She was launched on 4 May and delivered on 12 May. Collided with the American tanker Montana off Cape Henry, Virginia (36°53′N 73°00′W) on 1 June 1943 whilst on a voyage from Baltimore to the Persian Gulf. She exploded and sank.

== John Morton ==
John Morton was built by Permanente Metals Corporation. Her keel was laid on 22 May 1942. She was launched on 21 July and delivered on 3 August. Laid up in the James River post-war, she was scrapped ant Kearny in February 1972.

== John M. Palmer ==
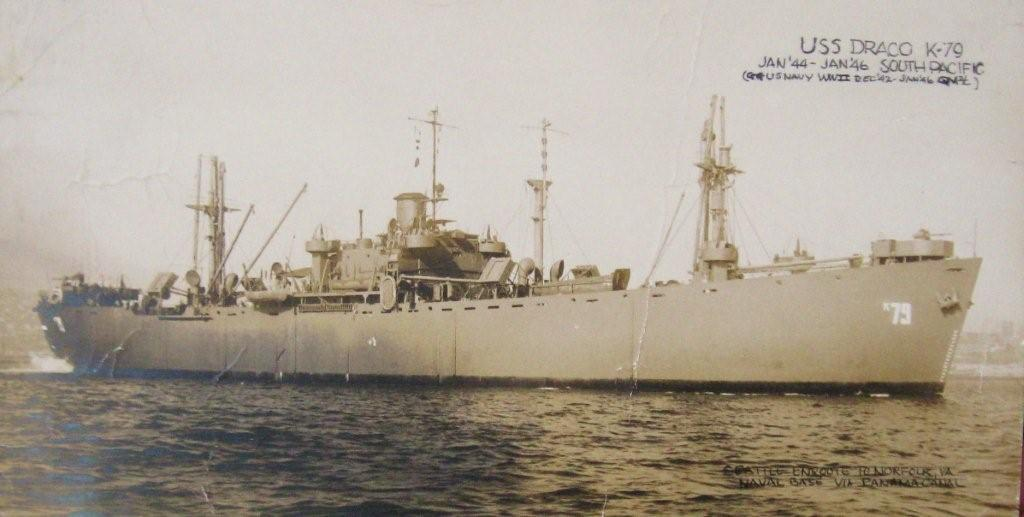
USS Draco

John M. Palmer was built by Permanente Metals Corporation. Her keel was laid on 15 December 1942. She was launched on 19 January 1943 and delivered on 31 January. To the United States Navy and renamed Draco. Returned to the WSA in November 1945 and renamed John M. Palmer. Laid up in reserve. Sold in 1947 to Southern Steamship Ltd. and renamed President Kruger. Sold in 1949 to Northern Steamship Ltd. Sold in 1951 to Compania Navigation Hidalgo, Panama and renamed Riviera. Reflagged to Liberia and operated under the management of Southern Star Shipping Co. Sold in 1953 to Compania Navigation Malaya, Panama and renamed Effie. Remained under the same flag and management. Sold in 1958 to Southern Steamship Ltd and renamed President Pretorius. Reflagged to the United Kingdom and operated under the British branch of her owners. Reflagged to South Africa in 1960. Sold in 1963 to Southatlantic Carriers Corp. Reflagged to Liberia and operated under the management of United Operators Shipping Agencies. She was scrapped at Kaohsiung in April 1968.

== John M. Parker ==
John M. Parker was built by Delta Shipbuilding Company. Her keel was laid on 27 January 1944. She was launched on 11 March and delivered on 26 April. She was scrapped at Oakland in 1958.

== John M. Schofield ==
John M. Scofield was built by Permanente Metals Corporation. Her keel was laid on 17 October 1942. She was launched on 23 November and delivered on 30 November. She was scrapped at Portland, Oregon in August 1962.

== John M. T. Finney ==
John M. T. Finney was built by Bethlehem Fairfield Shipyard. Her keel was laid on 27 April 1943. She was launched as John M. T. Finney on 21 May and delivered as Christian Michelson on 31 May. She was torpedoed and damaged in the Mediterranean Sea 80 nautical miles (150 km) west of Bizerta, Algeria by U-410 on 26 September 1943 whilst on a voyage from New York to Bizerta. She subsequently exploded and sank.

=== John Muir ===
John Muir was built by Marinship Corporation, Sausalito, California. Her keel was laid on 31 July 1942. She was launched on 22 November and delivered on 31 December. She was scrapped at Portland, Oregon in May 1966.

== John Murray Forbes ==
John Murray Forbes was built by New England Shipbuilding Corporation. Her keel was laid on 29 September 1942. She was launched on 26 November and delivered on 16 January 1943. She was scrapped at Portland, Oregon in April 1967.

== John N. Maffitt ==
John N. Maffitt was built by North Carolina Shipbuilding Company. Her keel was laid on 4 July 1943. She was launched on 4 August and delivered on 12 August. She was scrapped in Philadelphia in 1966.

== Johnny Appleseed ==
Johnny Appleseed was built by Todd Houston Shipbuilding Corporation. Her keel was laid on 2 September 1944. She was launched on 11 October and delivered on 20 October. She was scrapped at Philadelphia in March 1964.

== John N. Robins ==
John N. Robins was built by New England Shipbuilding Corporation. Her keel was laid on 9 August 1943. She was launched on 30 September and delivered on 11 October. Built for the WSA, she was operated under the management of American Export Lines. To the French Government in 1946. Operated under the management of Sociètè Générale des Transportes Maritimes à Vapeur. Renamed Le Lavandou in 1947. Management transferred to Compagnie des Transportes Oceaniques in 1949, then to Compagnie de Navigation Fraissinet et de Cyprien Fabre in 1956. Sold in 1963 to Compagnie Metallurgique & Minière, Casablanca and renamed Kettara VIII. Reflagged to Panama. She was scrapped at Osaka, Japan in 1964.

=== John Owen ===
John Owen was built by North Carolina Shipbuilding Company. Her keel was laid on 15 April 1943. She was launched on 10 May and delivered on 16 May. She was scrapped at Portland, Oregon in August 1964.

== John Page ==
John Page was built by California Shipbuilding Corporation. Her keel was laid on 11 March 1942. She was launched on 19 May and delivered on 18 June. She was scrapped at Richmond in November 1959.

== John P. Altgeld ==
John P. Altgeld was a tanker built by California Shipbuilding Corporation. She was completed in November 1943. Built for the WSA, she was operated under the management of Pacific Tankers Co. Laid up in the Hudson River in 1948. Sold in 1951 to Dorac Shipping Corp. and renamed Androil. Operated under the management of Palmer Shipping Corp. Management transferred to National Shipping & Trading Corp. in 1952. Sold in 1955 to Andreavapor Compania Navigation, Panama and renamed National Hope. Reflagged to Liberia. Rebuilt to a cargo ship at Nagasaki, Japan. Lengthened to 511 feet 6 inches (155.91 m) and now 8,428 GRT. Sold in 1961 to Hellenic Shipping & Industries Co. and renamed Kavala. Reflagged to Greece. Reflagged to Liberia in 1962. Sold in 1967 to Pacific Steamship Co and renamed Pacific. Operated under the management of Robert Pierot. Sold in 1968 to China Marine Investment Co., Hong Kong. Reflagged to Taiwan. She was scrapped at Kaohsiung in October 1969.

== John Paul Jones ==
John Paul Jones was built by California Shipbuilding Corporation. Her keel was laid on 27 June 1941. She was launched on 3 December and delivered on 30 March 1942. Laid up at Mobile post-war, she was scrapped there in August 1970.

== John Penn ==
John Penn was built by North Carolina Shipbuilding Company. Her keel was laid on 23 September 1941. She was launched on 12 April and delivered on 11 May. Built for the WSA, she was operated under the management of Lykes Brothers Steamship Company. Torpedoed and damaged by aircraft in the Greenland Sea (76°00′N 10°15′E) on 13 September 1942 whilst on a voyage from Loch Ewe to Arkhangelsk as a member of Convoy PQ 18. She was sunk by the convoy escorts.

== John P. Gaines ==
John P. Gaines was built by Oregon Shipbuilding Corporation. Her keel was laid on 21 June 1943. She was launched on 11 July and delivered on 18 July. Built for the WSA, she was operated under the management of Northland Transportation Co. Shhe broke in two off Shumagin Island, Alaska on 24 November 1943 whilst on a voyage from Adak, Alaska to Pleasant Island, Alaska. The bow section was presumed to have sunk. The stern section came ashore on Koniuji Island. She was declared a total loss.

== John P. Harris ==
John P. Harris was built by Southeastern Shipbuilding Corporation. Her keel was laid on 3 August 1944. She was launched on 13 September and delivered on 28 September. Built for the WSA, she was operated under the management of Black Diamond Steamship Company. Management transferred to Shephard Steamship Co. in 1946. Laid up at Mobile in 1949. Sold in 1951 to K. & C. Steamship Corp., New York and renamed George M. Culucundis. Sold in 1952 to Bournemouth Steamship Corp. and renamed Seavictor. Operated under the management of Orion Shipping & Trading Co. Sold in 1954 to Seacrest Shipping Co. and renamed Evibelle. Operated under the management of Starboard Shipping Inc. Sold in 1957 to Bournemouth Steamship Corp., remaining under the same management. Sold in 1958 to Doric Shipping & Trading Corp., New York. Placed under the management of Starboard Shipping Inc. in 1961. Sold in 1965 to Bonamar Shipping Corp and renamed Grethe. Reflagged to Liberia and operated under the management of Motorships Chartering Corp. She was scrapped at Tsuneishi in April 1967.

== John Philip Sousa ==
John Philip Sousa was built by St. Johns River Shipbuilding Company. Her keel was laid on 29 March 1943. She was launched on 4 July and delivered on 6 August. Built for the WSA, she was operated under the management of Wessel, Duval & Co. Sold in 1946 to Compania Internacional de Vapores, Panama and renamed Erato. Reflagged to Honduras and operated under the management of Simpson, Spence & Young. Management transferred to North American Shipping & Trading Co. in 1948. Sold in 1954 to Belen Compania Navigation, Panama and renamed Taxiarchis. Remaining under the Honduran flag and operated under the management of Lemos Bros. Sold in 1960 to Protostatis Compania Navigation, Panama and renamed Protostatis. Reflagged to Greece, remaining under the same management. She ran aground in Lake Ontario on 30 September 1965 whilst on a voyage from Detroit, Michigan, United States to Genoa. She was refloated on 12 October and towed to Kingston, Canada. She ran aground on Wolfe Island in the Saint Lawrence River whilst under tow from Kingston to Genoa for repairs. Abandoned as a constructive total loss, she was refloated on 31 January 1966. She was scrapped at Valencia in July 1966.

== John P. Holland ==
John P. Holland was built by Oregon Shipbuilding Corporation. Her keel was laid on 2 October 1942. She was launched on 29 October and delivered on 10 November. She was scrapped at Panama City, Florida in November 1964.

== John P. Mitchel ==
John P. Mitchel was built by North Carolina Shipbuilding Company. Her keel was laid on 28 April 1943. She was launched on 23 May and delivered on 29 May. Laid up in the Hudson River post-war. She was sold to Karachi shipbreakers in December 1970. Resold, she was scrapped at Santander in June 1971.

== John P. Poe ==
John P. Poe was built by Bethlehem Fairfield Shipyard. Her keel was laid on 24 May 1942. She was launched on 25 July and delivered on 31 July. She ran aground near Dover, United Kingdom on 26 March 1946. She was refloated with assistance from the Walmer Lifeboat. Laid up at Mobile post-war, she was scrapped at Panama City, Florida in January 1972.

== John Randolph ==
John Randolph was built by Bethlehem Fairfield Shipyard. Her keel was laid on 15 July 1941. She was launched on 30 December and delivered on 27 February 1942. Built for the WSA, she was operated under the management of Union Sulphur Company. She struck a mine and sank in the Denmark Strait on 5 July 1942 whilst on a voyage from a port in the north of the Soviet Union to Reykjavík, Iceland. The bow section was salvaged and beached, subsequently used by the United States Navy as a storage hulk. It was taken under tow for Faslane, United Kingdom in August 1952. It broke free from the tow on 1 September and came ashore in Torrisdale Bay on 5 September and was wrecked.

== John Reed ==
John Reed was built by Permanente Metals Corporation. Her keel was laid on 7 August 1943. She was launched as John Reed on 31 August and delivered as Sampford on 12 September. To the MoWT under Lend-Lease. Operated under the management of Andrew Weir & Co. Sold in 1947 to The Bank Line Ltd. and renamed Rowanbank, remaining under the same management. Sold in 1959 to Taiship Co. Ltd, Hong Kong and renamed Taiwind. Remaining under the British flag. Sold in 1962 to Northwind Navigation Co., Panama. Operated under the management of her previous owner. Collided with the tanker St. Matthew 8 nautical miles (15 km) east of Irosaki, Japan (34°33′N 139°01′E) on 25 July 1966 whilst on a voyage from Chiba to Wakamatsu, Japan and was holed. She was towed to Uraga and declared a constructive total loss. She was scrapped at Yokosuka in January 1967.

== John Ringling ==
John Ringling was built by St. Johns River Shipbuilding Company. Her keel was laid on 1 August 1944. She was launched on 10 September and delivered on 23 September. Laid up at Beaumont post-war, she was scrapped at Brownsville in March 1972.

== John R. McQuigg ==
John R. McQuigg was built by J. A. Jones Construction Company, Panama City. Her keel was laid on 14 June 1944. She was launched on 19 July and delivered on 31 July. Built for the WSA, she was operated under the management of American South African Line. Sold in 1946 to Compagnia di Navigazione Leonardo Arrivabene, Venice and renamed Villa di Brugine. Placed under the management of Arrivabene Riunione Compagnia Armamento in 1949. Renamed Brugine in 1956. Sold in 1959 to Plate Shipping Co., Panama and renamed Plate Exporter. Reflagged to Greece and operated under the management of Pandelis Ltd. Renamed Panexporter in 1967. Sold later that year to Martrafico Compania Navigaiton, Panama, remaining under the Greek flag. She was scrapped at Whampoa Dock, Hong Kong in December 1968.

== John Roach ==
John Roach was built by Permanente Metals Corporation. Her keel was laid on 7 February 1944. She was launched on 1 March and delivered on 30 March. Built for the WSA, she was operated under the management of Pope & Talbot Inc. Management transferred to Wessel, Duval & Co. in 1946. Sold later that year to Sud-Americano de Vapores, Panama and renamed Sapho. Reflagged to Honduras and operated under the management of Simpson, Spence & Young. Sold in 1950 to Compania Internacional de Vapores, Panama. Remaining under the Honduran flag and operated under the management of North American Shipping & Trading Co. Sold in 1954 to Termar Compania Maritima & Commercial. Reflagged to Liberia and operated under the management of D. J. Negroponte Inc. She was scrapped at Kaohsiung in November 1967.

== John Robert Gordon ==
John Robert Gordon was built by New England Shipbuilding Corporation. Her keel was laid on 29 March 1945. She was launched on 22 May and delivered on 9 June. To the French Government under Lend-Lease. Sold to the French Government in 1946 and operated under the management of Compagnie Générale Transatlantique. Renamed Saint Marcouf in 1947. Management transferred to Compagnie des Messageries Maritimes in 1950. Sold in 1960 to International Navigation Corp. and renamed Springwater. Reflagged to Liberia and operated under the management of W. H. Muller & Co. Sold in 1961 to Seacrest Shipping Corp., Lugano and renamed Seacrest. Reflagged to Liberia. She ran aground near Barcelona, Spain on 5 June 1963 whilst on a voyage from Boston to Genoa. She was refloated on 6 July and towed to Genoa. She was scrapped at La Spezia in October 1963.

== John Ross ==
John Ross was built by Permamentes Metals Corporation. Her keel was laid on 19 June 1943. She was launched on 10 July and delivered on 23 July. Built for the WSA, she was operated under the management of Seas Shipping Co. Sold in 1947 to Hellenic Lines, Piraeus and renamed Hellenic Wave. Operated under the management of P. G. Calamanopulos. Sold in 1970 to Pollux Shipping Co. and renamed Aghios Ermolaos. Reflagged to Cyprus and operated under the management of Canopus Shipping SA. She was scrapped at Castellón de la Plana in October 1973.

== John R. Park ==
John R. Park was built by Permanente Metals Corporation. Her keel was laid on 22 January 1943. She was launched on 20 February and delivered on 3 March. Built of the WSA, she was operated under the management of Luckenbach Steamship Co., Inc. She was torpedoed and sunk in the English Channel 20 nautical miles (37 km) south of The Lizard, United Kingdom (49°06′N 5°26′W) by U-399 on 21 March 1945 whilst on a voyage from Southampton to the United States.

== John Russell Pope ==
John Russell Pope was built by Bethlehem Fairfield Shipyard. Her keel was laid on 4 September 1943. She was launched as John Russell Pope on 27 September and delivered as Samdak on 6 October. To the MoWT under Lend-Lease. Operated under the management of Moss Hutchison Line. Sold in 1947 to Alpha South African Steamship Co. and renamed Alpha Vaa. Remaining under the British flag and operated under the management of Moller Line. Sold in 1948 to Alexander Shipping Co. and renamed Ledbury. Operated under the management of Houlder Bros. Sold in 1961 to the Polish Government and renamed Kopalnia Czelandz. Operated under the management of Polska Żegluga Morska. Sold to her managers in 1972. She arrived at Faslane for scrapping in February 1973.

== John Rutledge ==
John Rutledge was built by Permanente Metals Corporation. Her keel was laid on 22 August 1942. She was launched on 29 September and delivered on 23 October. She was scrapped at Portland, Oregon in June 1966.

== John S. Bassett ==
John S. Bassett was built by Permanente Metals Corporation. Her keel was laid on 4 August 1943. She was launched on 29 August and delivered on 9 September. Built for the WSA, she was operated under the management of American President Lines. to the French Government in 1947 and renamed Cavalaire. Operated under the management of Sociètè Générale de Transportes Maritimes à Vapeur. Sold in 1963 to Margalante Compania Navigation, Panama and renamed Akri. Reflagged to Liberia and operated under the management of Mavroleon Bros. She was scrapped at Etajima in May 1964.

== John S. Casement ==
John S. Casement was built by California Shipbuilding Corporation. Her keel was laid on 22 April 1943. She was launched on 13 May and delivered on 26 May. Built for the WSA, she was operated under the management of Luckenbach Steamship Co., Inc. Sold in 1946 to Compania Internacional de Vapores, Panama and renamed Leto. Reflagged to Honduras and operated under the management of Simpson, Spence & Young. Sold in 1948 to Son Shipping Co., Panama and renamed Norita, remaining under the Honduran flag. Sold in 1951 to Malorca Compania Navigation, Panama and renamed Seatreasure. Operated under the management of Orion Shipping & Trading Co. Renamed Transporter later that year. Sold in 1954 to Compania Carreto de Navigation, Panama and renamed Pearl Island. Operated under the management of Economou & Co. Sold in 1963 to Rodosi Co., Panama and renamed Mparmpamarcos. Operated under the management of Livanos & Sons. Sold in 1966 to Marigo Shipping Co. Reflagged to Cyprus and operated under the management of Frangos Bros. She collided with the Liberian tanker Gem Pet in the Shimonoseki Strait on 14 June 1967 whilst on a voyage from Media Luna, Cuba to a North Korean port. Declared a constructive total loss, she was scrapped at Kaohsiung in December 1967.

== John S. Copley ==
John S. Copley was built by Oregon Shipbuilding Corporation. Her keel was laid on 9 November 1942. She was launched on 5 December and delivered on 13 December. Built for the WSA, she was operated under the management of American Mail Line. She was scrapped at Portland, Oregon in October 1959.

== John Sedgewick ==
John Sedgewick was built by California Shipbuilding Corporation. Her keel was laid on 31 August 1942. She was launched on 7 October and delivered on 24 October. She was scrapped at Terminal Island in 1963.

== John Sergeant ==
John Sergeant was built by Bethlehem Fairfield Shipyard. Her keel was laid on 6 July 1942. She was launched on 21 August and delivered on 5 September. Converted at Newport News in 1956 to a gas turbine ship. A new bow section was fitted, increasing her length by about 20 feet (6.1 m). A new 17 feet 6 inches (5.33 m) diameter propeller was fitted. The turbine developed 7,575nhp and coul propel her at a speed in excess of 18 knots (33 km/h). Subsequently, laid up in the James River, she was scrapped at Portsmouth, Virginia in June 1972.

== John Sevier ==
John Sevier was built by Oregon Shipbuilding Corporation. Her keel was laid on 18 March 1942. She was launched on 30 April and delivered on 22 May. Built for the WSA, she was operated under the management of States Steamship Co. Torpedoed and sunk in the Caribbean Sea north of Cuba (20°49′N 74°00′W) by U-185 on 6 April 1943 whilst on a voyage from Demerara, British Guiana to Mobile.

== John Sharp Williams ==
John Sharp Williams was built by Delta Shipbuilding Company. Her keel was laid on 3 May 1943. She was launched on 8 June and delivered on 28 June. She was scrapped at Panama City, Florida in August 1961.

== John Sherman ==
John Sherman was built by Permanente Metals Corporation. Her keel was laid on 1 December 1943. She was launched on 23 December and delivered on 29 January 1944. Built for the WSA, she was operated under the management of Alcoa Steamship Co. Sold in 1947 to Atlantic Maritime Co. and renamed Atlantic Coast. Reflagged to Panama and operated under the management of Boyd, Weir & Sewell. Management transferred to Livanos & Co. in 1948. Reflagged to Liberia in 1950. Sold in 1952 to Atlantic Cargo Carriers Inc., then sold in 1953 to Atlantic Freighters Ltd., remaining under the same flag and management throughout. Sold in 1961 to A. Demades & D. Gioulis and renamed Demos. Reflagged to Greece and operated under the management of Livanos Ltd. Sold in 1965 to Demos Special Maritime Co. She was scrapped at Osaka in September 1967.

== Johns Hopkins ==
Johns Hopkins was a limited troop carrier built by Bethlehem Fairfield Shipyard. Her keel was laid on 25 January 1943. She was launched on 10 March and delivered on 6 April. Built for the WSA, she was operated under the management of North Atlantic & Gulf Coast Steamship Co. She struck a mine and was damaged at Marseille, France on 2 October 1944 whilst on a voyage from Oran, Algeria to Marseille. She was towed in to Marseille by a United States Navy tug. Subsequently repaired and returned to service. Sold in 1946 to Compania Internacional de Vapores, Panama and renamed Thetis. Reflagged to Honduras and operated under the management of Simpson, Spence & Young. Management transferred to North American Shipping & Trading Co. in 1949. Sold in 1950 to Compania Commercial Maritima, Panama. Remaining under the Honduran flag and operated under the management of her former owner. Sold in 1952 to Compania de Commercio y Vapores, Panama and renamed Santa Elena. Remaining under the Honduran flag and operated under the management of D. J. Negroponte. She collided with the British cargo ship Prospector in the River Thames on 23 December 1956. Sold in 1960 to Eleni Shipping Co. and renamed Eleni K.. Reflagged to Greece and operated under the management of Taflambas Bros. Management transferred to Stathatos & Co. in 1961. She broke in two and sank 8 nautical miles (15 km) off Thevenard, Australia on 29 September 1966 whilst on a voyage from Port Lincoln, Australia to a British port. She was refloated on 17 November and beached on Goat Island (32°18′S 133°32′E) and was abandoned.

== John S. Mosby ==
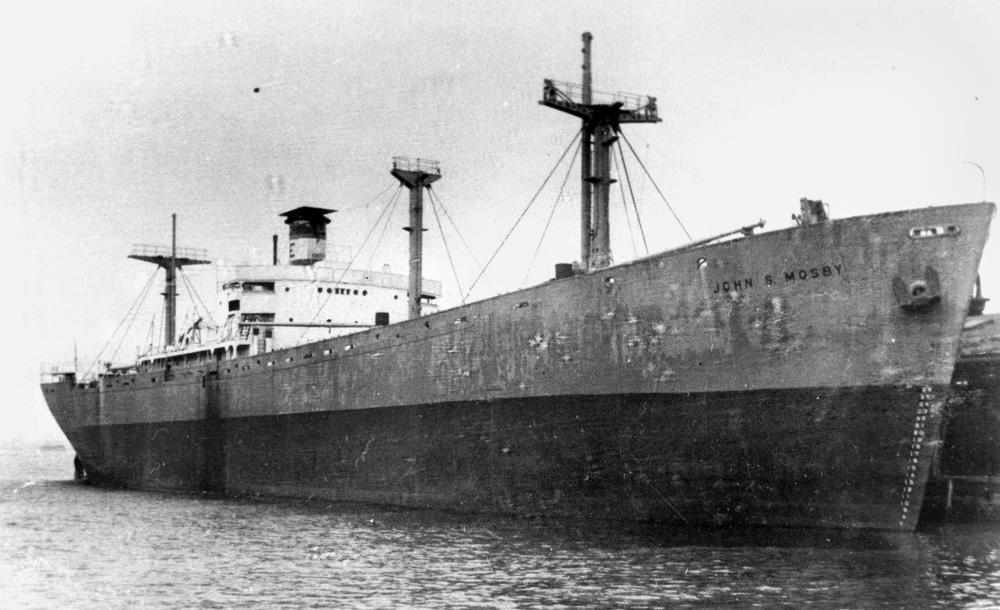
John S. Mosby

John S. Mosby was built by St. Johns River Shipbuilding Company. Her keel was laid on 22 July 1943. She was launched on 3 October and delivered on 16 October. Laid up on the Hudson River post-war. Sold to Karachi shipbreakers in December 1970. Resold, she was scrapped at Burriana, Spain in October 1971.

== John S. Pillsbury ==
John S. Pillsbury was built by California Shipbuilding Corporation. Her keel was laid on 20 February 1943. She was launched on 19 March and delivered on 4 April. She was scrapped at Panama City, Florida in March 1968.

== John S. Sargent ==
John S. Sargent was built by Permanente Metals Corporation. Her keel was laid on 6 June 1943. She was launched on 27 June and delivered on 9 July. She was scrapped at Kearny in March 1970.

== John Stagg ==
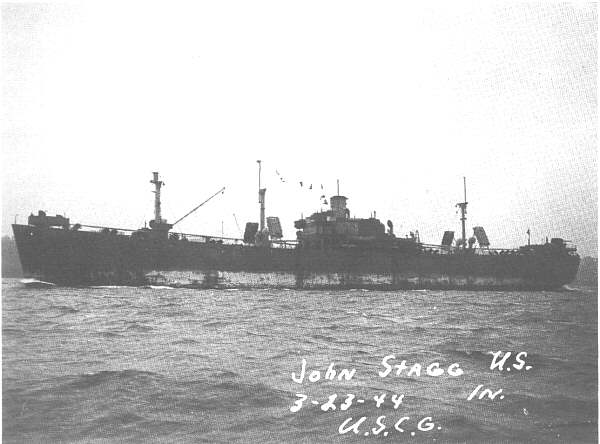
John Stagg

John Stagg was a tanker built by Delta Shipbuilding Company. Her keel was laid on 18 May 1943. She was launched on 7 July and delivered on 4 September. Built for the WSA, she was operated under the management of Bernuth-Lembcke Company. Sold in 1948 to Philadelphia Marine Corp., Dover, Delaware. Sold in 1950 to Panoil Transport Corp., New York and renamed Takoil. Sold in 1951 to National Shipping & Trading Corp, New York. Renamed National Servant in 1954 and reflagged to Liberia. Sold in 1955 to Takivapor Compania Navigation. She collided with the British cargo ship Mandasor in the Scheldt on 3 May 1956 and was severely damaged. Converted to a cargo ship at Schiedam. Lengthened at Maizuru in 1956. Now 511 feet 6 inches (155.91 m) long and 8,433 GRT. Sold in 1961 to Hellenic Shipping & Industries Co. and renamed Yiannina. Reflagged to Greece. Reflagged to Liberia in 1963. She was scrapped at Hirao in October 1968.

== John Steele ==
John Steele was built by California Shipbuilding Corporation. Her keel was laid on 30 April 1942. She was launched on 21 June and delivered on 14 July. She was scrapped in Baltimore in November 1961.

== John Stevens ==
John Stevens was built by Permanente Metals Corporation. Her keel was laid on 13 August 1942. She was launched on 22 September and delivered on 8 October. She was scrapped at Baltimore in February 1962.

== John Stevenson ==
John Stevenson was built by Bethlehem Fairfield Shipyard. Her keel was laid on 1 June 1943. She was launched on 30 June and delivered on 12 July. To the United States Navy in September 1955. Converted to a minesweeper. Laid up in reserve in the Hudson River. Sold to Karachi shipbreakers in December 1970. Resold, she was scrapped at Bilbao in June 1971.

== John Straub ==
John Straub was built by Oregon Shipbuilding Corporation. Her keel was laid on 8 November 1943. She was launched on 27 November and delivered on 11 December. Built for the WSA, she was operated under the management of Alaska Steamship Co. She was torpedoed by I-180, broke in two and sank 20 nautical miles (37 km) off Sannak Island, Alaska (54°22′N 163°24′W) on 19 April 1944 whilst on a voyage from Seattle to Dutch Harbor, Alaska.

== John Sullivan ==
John Sullivan was built by New England Shipbuilding Corporation. Her keel was laid on 17 January 1943. She was launched on 28 March and delivered on 12 April. She was scrapped at Baltimore in June 1963.

== John Swett ==
John Swett was built by Permanente Metals Corporation. Her keel was laid on 30 September 1943. She was launched on 19 October and delivered on 28 October. She was scrapped at Philadelphia in February 1965.

== John T. Clark ==
John T. Clark was built by Bethlehem Fairfield Shipyard. Her keel was laid on 17 October 1943. She was launched at John T. Clark on 15 November and delivered as Samcleve on 23 November. To the MoWT under Lend-Lease. Operated under the management of A. Holt & Co. Sold in 1947 to Ocean Steamship Co. and renamed Tantalus. Remained under the same management. Sold in 1958 to Ditta Luigi Pittaluga Vapori, Genoa and renamed Urbania. Sold in 1965 to Henry Coe & Clerici, Genoa and renamed Cocler. She was scrapped at Vado Ligure in January 1975.

== John T. Holt ==
John T. Holt was built by Bethlehem Fairfield Shipyard. Her keel was laid on 30 June 1943. She was launched on 29 July and delivered on 9 August. She was scrapped in Philadelphia in 1962.

== John Tipton ==
John Tipton was built by California Shipbuilding Corporation. Her keel was laid on 17 August 1943. She was launched as John Tipton on 8 September and delivered as Samtredy on 21 September. To the MoWT under Lend-Lease, operated under the management of Prince Line Ltd. Sold in 1947 to Furness, Withy & Co., London and renamed Pacific Importer. Sold in 1953 to Ditta Luigi Pittaluga Vapori, Genoa and renamed Aquitania. Sold in 1965 to Akrotiri Steamship Corp. and renamed Ayia Marina. Reflagged to Liberia and operated under the management of Cape Shipping Ltd. She was laid up at Rio de Janeiro, Brazil in 1968. Arrested for debts in 1969, she was sold to shipbreakers at Rio de Janeiro in December 1969.

== John T. McMillan ==
John T. McMillan was built by Permanente Metals Corporation. Her keel was laid on 25 May 1943. She was launched on 15 June and delivered on 26 June. She was scrapped at Tacoma in April 1970.

== John Trumbull ==
John Trumbull was a limited troop carrier built by New England Shipbuilding Corporation. Her keel was laid on 26 November 1942. She was launched on 25 February 1943 and delivered on 13 March. Built for the WSA, she was operated under the management of Sprague Steamship Co. To the French Government in 1946. Operated under the management of Chargeurs Réunis. Renamed Abbeville in 1947. Sold in 1960 to ZIM Israel Navigation Co., Haifa, Israel and renamed Fede. New diesel engine fitted by Ateliers et Chantiers de Bretagne, Nantes in 1962. Sold in 1961 to Pagan Steamship Corp., Hong Kong and renamed Pagan. Reflagged to the United Kingdom. Sold in 1964 to Burma Five Star Line Ltd., Rangoon, Burma. She was scrapped at Hong Kong in June 1970. Her diesel engine was installed in the Burma Five Star Line's Pyidawnyunt.

== John Vining ==
John Vining was built by Delta Shipbuilding Company. Her keel was laid on 27 September 1942. She was launched on 23 November and delivered on 7 December. She was scrapped at Baltimore in 1960.

== John Walker ==
John Walker was built by Bethlehem Fairfield Shipyard. Her keel was laid on 1 June 1942. She was launched on 22 July and delivered on 30 July. She was scrapped at Jersey City, New Jersey in 1961.

== John Wanamaker ==
John Wanamaker was built by Bethlehem Fairfield Shipyard. Her keel was laid on 31 May 1943. She was launched on 11 July and delivered on 20 July. She was scrapped at Mobile in July 1969.

== John W. Brown ==
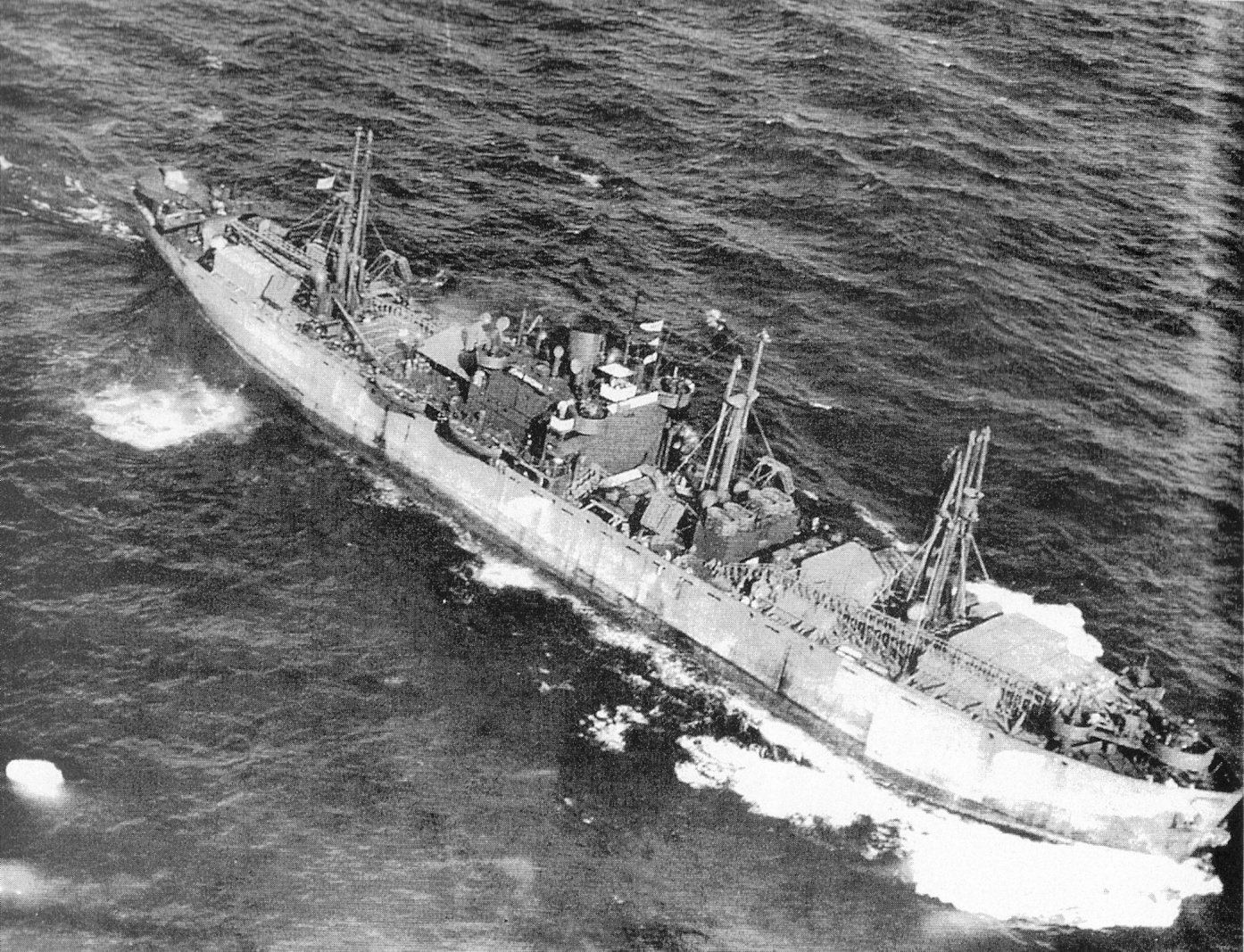
John W. Brown

John W. Brown was built by Bethlehem Fairfield Shipyard. Her keel was laid on 28 July 1942. She was launched on 7 September and delivered on 19 September. Converted to a troopship. Lent to New York City Board of Education in November 1945 and used as a school ship. Laid up in reserve in the James River on 29 July 1983. To the John W. Brown Preservation Project on 18 October 1983. As of November 2026 she is preserved as a museum ship.

== John W. Burgess ==
John W. Burgess was built by Permanente Metals Corporation. Her keel was laid on 20 December 1943. She was launched on 12 January 1944 and delivered on 19 January. She was scrapped at Tacoma in November 1964.

== John W. Cullen ==
John W. Cullen

John W. Cullen was built by Oregon Shipbuilding Corporation. Her keel was laid on 29 January 1943. She was launched on 22 February and delivered on 4 March. Laid up at Beaumont post-war. She broke free from her tow on 23 January 1963 whilst being towed to New Orleans for scrapping. Although taken in tow again, she broke free on 27 January. She was found aground at 29°11′N 94°55′W on 6 February. Refloated on 14 February, she subsequently resumed her voyage under tow. She was scrapped at New Orleans in June 1963.

== John W. Davis ==
John W. Davis was built by Oregon Shipbuilding Corporation. Her keel was laid on 13 November 1943. She was launched on 3 December and delivered on 17 December. She was scrapped at Mobile in August 1961.

== John W. Draper ==
John W. Draper was built by Delta Shipbuilding Company. Her keel was laid on 14 September 1944. She was launched as John W. Draper on 21 October and delivered to the United States Navy as Gratia on 20 November. Placed in reserve at Pearl Harbor in June 1946. To USMC in June 1947 and laid up in Suisun Bay. She was reported to have been scrapped at Portland, Oregon in 1965.

== John W. Foster ==
John W. Foster was built by Permanente Metals Corporation. Her keel was laid on 23 September 1943. She was launched on 11 October and delivered on 21 October. Laid up in the James River post-war, she was scrapped at La Spezia in January 1971.

== John W. Garrett ==
John W. Garrett was built by Bethlehem Fairfield Shipyard. Her keel was laid on 23 July 1943. She was launched on 19 August and delivered on 27 August. Built for the WSA, she was operated under the management of Stockard Steamship Corp. To the United States War Department in 1946. Laid up in Suisun Bay in 1948. Sold in 1951 to Arrow Feed & Oil Co. and renamed Fribourg Trader. Operated under the management of Arrow Steamship Co. Sold later that year to Fribourg Trading Co., New York, remaining under the same management. Reflagged to Liberia in 1954. Sold in 1956 to Deepwater Transport SA, Panama and renamed Felix R. P., remaining under the same flag and management. Sold later that year to Long Ships Inc. and renamed Jane B. L. Operated under the management of Seaways Shipping Corp. Sold in 1961 to Marifortuna Naviera, Panama and renamed Maritihi. Remaining under the Liberian flag and operated under the management of Chandris Ltd. She was scrapped at Hirao in June 1967.

== John W. Gates ==
John W. Gates was built by Todd Houston Shipbuilding Corporation. Her keel was laid on 25 October 1943. She was launched on 7 December and delivered on 17 December. Built for the WSA, she was operated under the management of A. H. Bull & Co. Sold in 1946 to Constantine Konialidis, Montevideo, Uruguay and renamed Aristotelis. Reflagged to Honduras. Sold in 1947 to Sociedad Armamente Aristomenis, Panama. Remained under the Honduran flag and operated under the management of her former owner. Management transferred to Olympic Maritime SA in 1955. Reflagged to Liberia in 1958. Sold in 1966 to Columbia Marine SA, Panama. Remaining under the same flag and managers. She was scrapped at Onomichi in October 1968.

== John W. Griffiths ==
John W. Griffiths was built by J. A. Jones Construction Company, Panama City. Her keel was laid on 13 December 1943. She was launched on 9 February 1944 and delivered on 25 March. Built for the WSA, she was operated under the management of Blidberg-Rothchild Co. Sold in 1947 to Corrado Società Anonyme di Navigazione, Genoa and renamed Dino. Sold in 1963 to Sicilarma Società di Navigazione per Azioni, Genoa and renamed Imera. She was scrapped at La Spezia in May 1965.

== John White ==
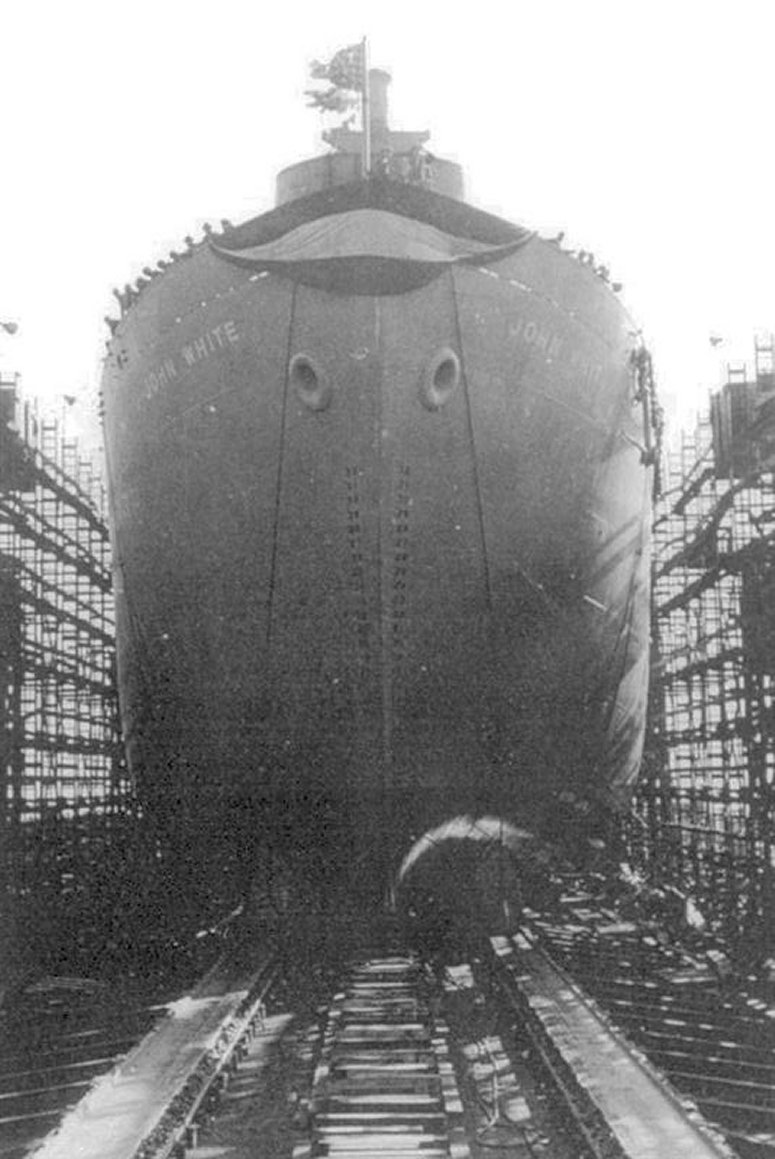
Launcing of John White.

John White was built by St. Johns River Shipbuilding Company. Her keel was laid on 17 November 1943. She was launched on 31 December and delivered on 17 January 1944. To the United States Navy and renamed Menkar. Converted for naval use by Dade Drydock Co., Miami, Florida. Transferred to the United States Coast Guard in October 1944. Returned to WSA in April 1946 and renamed John White. Laid up in Suisun Bay. She was scrapped at Oakland in May 1964.

== John Whiteaker ==
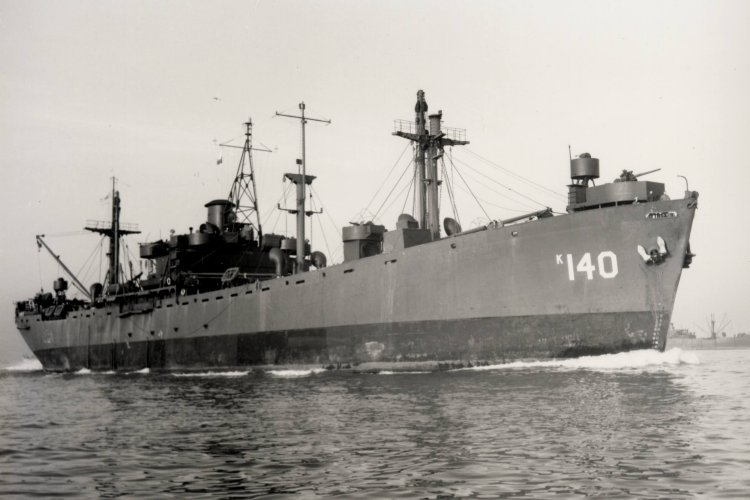
USS Situla

John Whiteaker was built by Oregon Shipbuilding Corporation. Her keel was laid on 9 January 1943. She was launched on 7 February and delivered on 16 February. To the United States Navy in December 1943 and renamed Situla. Converted for naval service at San Francisco Navy Yard. Laid up in reserve at Pearl Harbor in April 1946. Towed to San Francisco in December 1947. Returned to USMC and laid up in Suisun Bay. She was scrapped at Oakland in August 1961.

== John W. Hoyt ==
John W. Hoyt was built by Permanente Metals Corporation. Her keel was laid on 9 August 1943. She was launched on 31 August and delivered on 8 September. She was scrapped at Oakland in September 1961.

== John Winthrop ==
John Winthrop New England Shipbuilding Corporation. Her keel was laid on 27 September 1941. She was launched on 7 June 1942 and delivered on 28 July. Built for the WSA, she was operated under the management of United Fruit Company. Torpedoed and sunk in the Atlantic Ocean (approximately 56°N 31°W) by U-619 on 24 September 1942 whilst on a voyage from the Clyde to New York.

== John Wise ==
John Wise was built by Permanente Metals Corporation. Her keel was laid on 16 March 1942. She was launched on 14 June and delivered on 30 June. Laid up at Mobile post-war, she was scrapped at Panama City, Florida in June 1971.

== John Witherspoon ==
John Witherspoon was built by Bethlehem Fairfield Shipyard. Her keel was laid on 10 December 1941. She was launched on 4 March 1942 and delivered on 23 April. Built for the WSA, she was operated under the management of Seas Shipping Co. Torpedoed and damaged in the Kara Sea (70°30′N 52°00′E) by U-255 on 6 July 1942 whilst a member of Convoy PQ 17. She broke in two and sank.

== John W. Mackay ==
John W. Mackay was built by Permanente Metals Corporation. Her keel was laid on 14 May 1943. She was launched on 6 June and delivered on 17 June. She was scrapped at Oakland in May 1969.

== John W. Meldrum ==
John W. Meldrum was built by Permanente Metals Corporation. Her keel was laid on 18 October 1943. She was launched on 13 November and delivered on 23 November. Laid up at Beaumont post-war, she was scrapped at Brownsville in July 1971.

== John Woolman ==
John Woolman was built by Bethlehem Fairfield Shipyard. Her keel was laid on 20 March 1943. She was launched on 22 April and delivered on 30 April. She was scrapped at Baltimore in October 1960.

== John W. Powell ==
John W. Powell was built by Bethlehem Fairfield Shipyard. Her keel was laid on 23 June 1943. She was launched on 28 July and delivered on 6 August. Built for the WSA, she was operated under the management of Cosmopolitan Shipping Co. Management transferred to Fribourg Steamship Co. in 1948. Laid up at Beaumont in 1949. Sold in 1951 to Anchor Steamship Corp. Operated under the management of Overseas Navigation Corp. Sold in 1954 to Seacarrier SA, Panama and renamed James Monroe. Reflagged to Liberia, remaining under the same management. Sold in 1958 to Union Shipping Corp., New York. Remaining under the Liberian flag and operated under the management of Herman Caro. Sold in 1962 to The Learner Co., Oakland. Remaining under the Liberian flag. Sold in 1963 to Independence Steamships Inc. and renamed Evangelistra. Remaining under the Liberian flag and operated under the management of Apollo Shipping Inc. She was scrapped at Hirao in October 1967.

== John Wright Stanly ==
John Wright Stanly was built by North Carolina Shipbuilding Company. Her keel was laid on 18 December 1942. She was launched on 19 January 1943 and delivered on 29 January. Built for the WSA, she was operated under the management of Barber Steamship Line & American West African Line. To the Norwegian Government under charter in January 1943 and renamed Leiv Eiriksson. Sold in October 1946 to Skibs A/S Eidsval, Oslo and renamed Vinni. Operated under the management of Sverre Ditlev Simonsen & Co. Sold in February 1954 to Ausonia di Navigazione di Fratelli di Alberto, Genoa and renamed Probitas. Operated under the management of Alberto Raveno & Figli. Sold in May 1954 to Adriatico Tirreno Jonio Ligure de Alberto Raveno & Figli, Genoa. Soled in January 1964 to Industria Armamente Spaa, Genoa. She arrived at Vado di Lagure for scrapping on 13 September 1968.

== John W. Searles ==
John W. Searles was built by California Shipbuilding Corporation. Her keel was laid on 6 November 1943. She was launched on 2 December and delivered on 22 December. Built for the WSA, she was operated under the management of General Steamship Corp. Sold in 1947 to Norness Shipping Co. and renamed Norness. Reflagged to Panama and operated under the management of Naess Mejlaender & Co. Sold in 1950 to Explorador Compania Navigation and renamed Leonidas D.. Remaining under the Panamanian flag and operated under the management of Orion Shipping & Trading Co. Sold in 1953 to Compania Europa Comercial y Maritima and renamed European Trader. Remaining under the Panamanian flag and operated under the management of Fafalios Ltd. Sold in 1963 to Chowgule Steamships Ltd, Goa, India and renamed Maratha Trader. Operated under the management of Fife Shipping Co. Sold in 1967 to Pent-Ocean Steamships Ltd., Bombay and renamed Samudra Jit. She was scrapped at Bombay in October 1972.

== John W. Troy ==
John W. Troy was built by Oregon Shipbuilding Corporation. Her keel was laid on 22 December 1943. She was launched on 10 January 1944 and delivered on 22 January. Built for the WSA, she was operated under the management of Alaska Steamship Co. Sold in 1947 to D. J. Dambasis, Athens and renamed Eleni D. Operated under the management of Lyros & Lemnos Ltd. Sold in 1949 to Alcyon Shipping Co., Piraeus, Operated under the management of Triton Shipping Inc. Sold in 1961 to Gulf Freighters Corp. and renamed Ocean Mariner. Reflagged to Liberia and operated under the management of Jason Steamship Co. She was scrapped at Sakai, Japan in March 1967.

== John W. Weekes ==
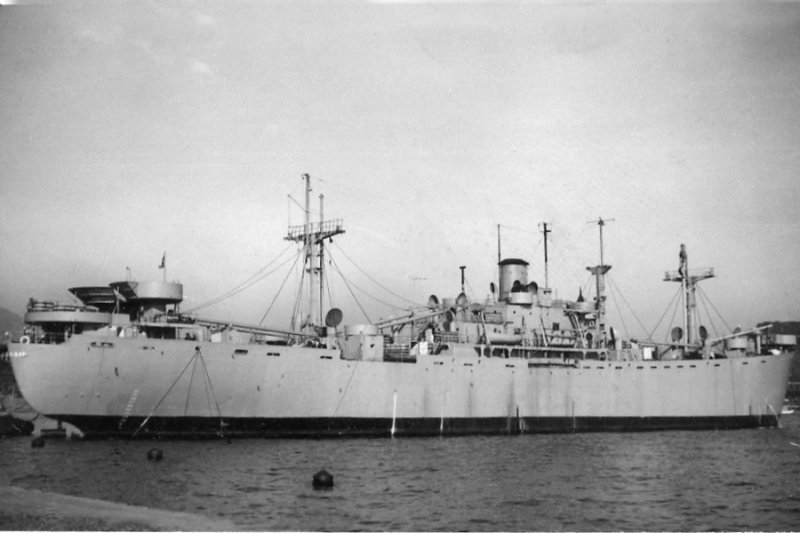
DuPage

John W. Weekes was built by Oregon Shipbuilding Corporation. Her keel was laid on 9 December 1942. She was launched on 2 January 1943 and delivered on 9 January. She was built for the WSA. Transferred to the United States Navy in 1951 for use as a barracks ship. Renamed DuPage but not commissioned. Struck from the navy list in 1959. No further trace, presumed scrapped.

== Jonas Lie ==
Jonas Lie was built by Southeastern Shipbuilding Corporation. Her keel was laid on 24 July 1944. She was launched on 7 September and delivered on 22 September. Built for the WSA, she was operated under the management of Agwilines Inc. Torpedoed and damaged in the English Channel (51°45′N 5°26′W) by U-1055 on 9 January 1945 whilst on a voyage from Swansea, United Kingdom to New York. Abandoned by her crew, she was taken in to, but the tow rope subsequently broke. No further trace, presumed foundered.

== Jonathan Edwards ==
Jonathan Edwards was built by Oregon Shipbuilding Corporation. Her keel was laid on 23 March 1942. She was launched on 5 May and delivered on 22 May. She was scrapped at Baltimore in January 1961.

== Jonathan Elmer ==
Jonathan Elmer was built by Bethlehem Fairfield Shipyard. Her keel was laid on 11 July 1942. She was launched on 31 August and delivered on 14 September. She was scrapped at Baltimore in 1960.

== Jonathan Grout ==
Jonathan Grout was built by Delta Shipbuilding Company. Her keel was laid on 11 May 1942. She was launched on 8 August and delivered on 5 September. Laid up at Mobile post-war, she was scrapped at New Orleans in May 1970.

== Jonathan Harrington ==
Jonathan Harrington was built by Oregon Shipbuilding Corporation. Her keel was laid on 11 July 1942. She was launched on 17 August and delivered on 29 August. She was scrapped at Oakland in August 1969.

== Jonathan Jennings ==
Jonathan Jennings was built by Oregon Shipbuilding Corporation. Her keel was laid on 23 April 1943. She was launched on 12 May and delivered on 20 May. To the United States Navy in November 1943 and renamed Talita. Converted for naval use by Tampa Shipbuilding Co. Laid up in reserve at Pearl Harbor in February 1946. Towed to San Francisco in July 1947. Returned to USMC and laid up in Suisun Bay. She was scrapped at Oakland in 1964.

== Jonathan P. Dolliver ==
Jonathan P. Dolliver was built by Permanente Metals Corporation. Her keel was laid on 8 May 1943. She was launched on 3 June and delivered on 22 June. Laid up in the James River post-war, she was scrapped at Castellón de la Plana in November 1972.

== Jonathan Sturges ==
Jonathan Sturges was built by Delta Shipbuilding Company. Her keel was laid on 20 August 1942. She was launched on 20 October and delivered on 10 November. Built for the WSA, she was operated under the management of Mississippi Shipping Co. Torpedoed and sunk in the Atlantic Ocean (46°15′N 38°11′W) by U-707 on 23 February 1943 whilst on a voyage from Liverpool to New York.

== Jonathan Trumbull ==
Jonathan Trumbull was built by Delta Shipbuilding Company. Her keel was laid on 8 September 1942. She was launched on 7 November and delivered on 28 November. Laid up at Mobile post-war, she was scrapped at Panama City, Florida in June 1970.

== Jonathan Worth ==
Jonathan Worth was built by North Carolina Shipbuilding Company. Her keel was laid on 11 February 1943. She was launched on 12 March and delivered on 19 March. She was scrapped at Panama City, Florida in October 1969.

== Jose Artigas ==
Jose Artigas was built by Bethlehem Fairfield Shipyard. Her keel was laid on 1 October 1943. She was launched as Jose Artigas on 23 October and delivered as Samokla on 27 October. To the MoWT under Lend-Lease. Operated under the management of Cayzer, Irvine & Co. Management transferred to Dene Shipping Co. in 1946. Returned to USMC in 1948. Officially renamed Jose Artigas but laid up at Wilmington, North Carolina as Samokla. She was scrapped at Newport News in 1962.

== Jose Bonifacio ==
Jose Bonifacio was built by North Carolina Shipbuilding Company. Her keel was laid on 16 March 1943. She was launched on 14 April and delivered on 21 April. Laid up in Puget Sound post-war, she was scrapped at Portland, Oregon in September 1970.

== Jose C. Barbosa ==
Jose C. Barbosa was built by Permanente Metals Corporation. Her keel was laid on 15 November 1943. She was launched on 5 December and delivered on 12 December. She was scrapped at Tacoma in March 1960.

== Jose G. Benitez ==
Jose G. Benitez was built by Todd Houston Shipbuilding Corporation. Her keel was laid on 22 December 1943. She was launched on 17 February 1944 and delivered on 29 February. Built for the WSA, she was operated under the management of W. J. Rountree & Co. Sold in 1947 to Panos S. Coummantaros, Piraeus and renamed Panagiotis Coumantaros. Operated under the management of Union Maritime & Shipping Co. Sold in 1958 to Evrotes Maritime Co., Piraeus. Sold in 1965 to Progress Navigation Ltd and renamed Filia. Remaining under the Greek flag and operated under the management of Carras Maritime Corp. Collided with the French cargo ship Tayga in the Red Sea (13°15′N 43°12′E) on 2 January 1967 whilst on a voyage from Tegal, Indonesia to Rotterdam, Netherlands. She was beached 2 nautical miles (3.7 km) west of Mokha, Federation of South Arabia and abandoned as a constructive total loss.

== Jose J. Acosta ==
Jose J. Acosta was built by Permanente Metals Corporation. Her keel was laid on 19 November 1943. She was launched on 10 December and delivered on 19 December. Built for the WSA, she was operated under the management of American President Lines. Sold in 1947 to Polena Società di Navigazione, Genoa and renamed Delfin. Sold in 1963 to Sovtorgflot, Odessa, Soviet Union and renamed Khibini. She was deleted from shipping registers in 1967. Presumed scrapped.

== Jose Marti ==
Jose Marti was built by Bethlehem Fairfield Shipyard. Her keel was laid on 12 June 1943. She was launched on 16 July and delivered on 29 July. Built for the WSA, she was operated under the management of A. H. Bull & Co. Management transferred to Sudden & Christensen in 1948. Sold in 1951 to Amherst Steamship Corp. Operated under the management of Overseas Navigation Corp. Sold in 1957 to New England Industries, remaining under the same management. Sold later that year to Oceanica Compania Navigation, Panama and renamed Minotaur. Reflagged to Liberia and operated under the management of D. J. Negroponte. Sold in 1958 to Panoceanica Shipping Corp. Remaining under the Liberian flag and operated under the management of Milmar Shipping & Trading Corp. Renamed Nata in 1959 and reflagged to Greece. Placed under the management of Stathatos & Co. in 1963. She was scrapped at Hirao in October 1966.

== Jose Navarro ==
Jose Navarro was built by Todd Houston Shipbuilding Corporation. Her keel was laid on 27 July 1943. She was launched on 13 September and delivered on 30 September. Built for the WSA, she was operated under the management of Grace Line Inc. Torpedoed and damaged in the Indian Ocean (8°20′N 70°35′E) by U-178 on 26 December 1943 whilst on a voyage from Houston to Calcutta, India. She was torpedoed and sunk by U-178 the next day.

== Jose M. Morelos ==
Jose M. Morelos was built by Permanente Metals Corporation. Her keel was laid on 28 February 1944. She was launched on 21 March and delivered on 28 March. Laid up at Beaumont post-war, she was sold to shipbreakers in Cleveland in October 1972.

== Jose Pedro Varela ==
Jose Pedro Varela was built by Permanente Metals Corporation. Her keel was laid on 5 May 1944. She was launched on 25 May and delivered on 31 May. Built for the WSA, she was operated under the joint management of Pacific-Atlantic Steamship Co. and States Steamship Co. Sold in 1947 to Dianex Corp. and renamed Elly. Operated under the management of Seatraders Inc. Sold in 1952 to International Navigation Co., New York and renamed Marven. Sold in 1955 to Ariate Compania Navigation, Panama and renamed Arion. Operated under the management of Maritime Agencies. Management transferred to Venizelos S.A. in 1963. She was scrapped at Etayima, Japan in December 1968.

== Joseph A. Brown ==
Joseph A. Brown was built by North Carolina Shipbuilding Company. Her keel was laid on 7 April 1943. She was launched on 30 April and delivered on 7 May. Laid up in the James River post-war, she was scrapped at Kearny in or after July 1974.

== Joseph A. Holmes ==
Joseph A. Holmes was built by Permanente Metals Corporation. Her keel was laid on 21 June 1943. She was launched on 11 July and delivered on 27 July. She was scrapped at Portland, Oregon in September 1965.

== Joseph Alston ==
Joseph Alston was built by North Carolina Shipbuilding Company. Her keel was laid on 10 October 1942. She was launched on 20 November and delivered on 30 November. She was scrapped at Richmond in July 1967.

== Joseph-Augustin Chevalier ==
Joseph-Augustin Chevalier was built by New England Shipbuilding Corporation. Her keel was laid on 20 April 1944. She was launched on 7 June and delivered on 14 June. Built for the WSA, she was operated under the management of Blidberg-Rothchild Co. Sold in 1946 to Marine Interests Corp., Jersey City. Renamed Marine Merchant in 1947. Converted to a bulk carrier, now 6,639 GRT. Sold in 1952 to Marine Navigation Co., New York. She broke in two and sank 40 nautical miles (74 km) south west of Portland, Maine on 14 April 1961 whilst on a voyage from Port Sulphur, Louisiana to Portland.

== Joseph B. Eastman ==
Joseph B. Eastman was built by Bethlehem Fairfield Shipyard. Her keel was laid on 30 May 1944. She was launched on 1 July and delivered on 15 July. Built for the WSA, she was operated under the management of Polarus Steamship Co. Sold in 1947 to Calmar Steamship Corp. and renamed Portmar. Sold in 1955 to Bethlehem Steel Corp. Operated under the management of Calmar Steamship Corp. Returned to USMC in 1964 and laid up in the James River. Sold for scrap in April 1971, she was scrapped at Gandia, Spain in June 1971.

== Joseph Carrigan ==
Joseph Carrigan was built by New England Shipbuilding Corporation. Her keel was laid on 29 January 1945. She was launched on 28 March and delivered on 14 April. Built for the WSA, she was operated under the management of U.S. Navigation Co. She struck a mine and was damaged off Labuan, Malaya on 10 September 1945 whilst on a voyage from Morotai, Netherlands East Indies to Labuan. She put in to Manila, where she was declared a constructive total loss. She was scrapped at Shanghai in May 1948.

== Joseph C. Avery ==
Joseph C. Avery was built by Oregon Shipbuilding Corporation. Her keel was laid on 7 May 1943. She was launched as Joseph C. Avery on 27 May and delivered as Kherson on 3 June. She was wrecked between Cape Povorotny and Akhomten Bay on 3 July 1943 whilst on her delivery voyage from Portland, Oregon to Vladivostok, Soviet Union. She broke in two. Both sections were refloated and towed to Petropavlovsk, Soviet Union for scrapping.

== Joseph C. Lincoln ==
Joseph C. Lincoln was built by New England Shipbuilding Corporation. Her keel was laid on 8 May 1944. She was launched on 24 June and delivered on 8 July. Built for the WSA, she was operated under the management of Eastern Gas & Fuel Association. Management transferred to Stockard Steamship Corp in 1946. Sold in 1951 to Traders Steamship Corp., New York and renamed Purplestar. Sold in 1954 to Alvarez Compania Navigation, Panama and renamed Epos. Reflagged to Liberia and operated under the management of Triton Shipping Inc. Renamed Rea in 1960 and reflagged to Greece. Sold in 1963 to Golden Marine Transport and renamed Pelikan. Reflagged to Liberia and operated under the management of Sincere Navigation Corp. She was scrapped at Kaohsiung in October 1966.

== Joseph E. Brown ==
Joseph E. Brown was built by Southeastern Shipbuilding Corporation. Her keel was laid on 9 June 1943. She was launched on 19 August and delivered on 31 August. Laid up at Mobile post-war, she was scuttled off Panama City, Florida on 29 September 1977.

== Joseph E. Johnston ==
Joseph E. Johnston was built by Todd Houston Shipbuilding Corporation. Her keel was laid on 15 September 1942. She was launched on 16 November and delivered on 30 November. She was scrapped at Kearny in May 1969.

== Joseph E. Wing ==
Joseph E. Wing was built by Permanente Metals Corporation. Her keel was laid on 13 December 1943. She was launched on 5 January 1944 and delivered on 11 February. Built for the WSA, she was operated under the management of Alcoa Steamship Co. Sold in 1947 to Società Azioni Emanuele V. Parodi, Genoa and renamed Emanuele V. Parodi. Sold in 1962 to Armosy Corp. and renamed Roby. Reflagged to Liberia and operated under the management of Sturla Società di Navigazione. She was scrapped at Yokosuka in September 1963.

== Joseph Francis ==
Joseph Francis was built by California Shipbuilding Corporation. Her keel was laid on 4 August 1943. She was launched on 27 August and delivered on 12 September. She was scrapped at Portland, Oregon in May 1960.

== Joseph Gale ==
Joseph Gale was built by Oregon Shipbuilding Corporation. Her keel was laid on 16 October 1942. She was launched on 11 November and delivered on 21 November. She was scrapped in Bordentown, New Jersey in March 1962.

== Joseph G. Cannon ==
Joseph G. Cannon was built by Permanente Metals Corporation. Her keel was laid on 28 November 1942. She was launched on 31 December and delivered on 10 January 1943. Built for the WSA, she was operated under the management of Weyerhauser Steamship Co. She was bombed and damaged off Sicily (36°55′N 15°13′E) on 12 July 1943 whilst on a voyage from Haifa, Palestine to a port in Sicily. She settled by the stern and grounded. Later refloated and towed to Malta, where she was repaired. Laid up in the James River post-war, she was sold to Philadelphia shipbreakers in December 1972.

== Joseph Goldberger ==
Joseph Goldberger was a tanker built by Delta Shipbuilding Company. Her keel was laid on 1 August 1943. She was launched on 14 September and delivered on 31 October. Built for the WSA, she was operated under the management of Spencer, Kellogg & Sons. Sold in 1948 to Ocean Tankers Inc., Dover, Delaware and renamed George Ogden. Operated under the management of Dow & Symmers. Sold in 1949 to Richmond N. Ryan, New York and renamed Talon. Sold in 1950 to Colonial Steamship Corp. and renamed Seacomet. Operated under the management of Orion Shipping & Trading Corp. Converted to a cargo ship at Amsterdam in 1954. now 7,183 GRT Sold that year to San Felipe Compania Navigation and reflagged to Panama. Lengthened at Kure in 1955, now 511 feet 6 inches (155.91 m) long and 8,426 GRT. Reflagged to Liberia that year. Renamed Andros Comet in 1957. Sold in 1960 to Seas Guardian Corp. and renamed Alpheios. Reflagged to Greece. Sold in 1964 to Austin Navigation Corp. and renamed Annie. Reflagged to Liberia and operated under the management of Eddie Steamship Co. She was scrapped at Kaohsiung in March 1969.

== Joseph Habersham ==
Joseph Habersham was built by Southeastern Shipbuilding Corporation. Her keel was laid on 20 August 1943. She was launched on 12 October and delivered on 26 October. She was scrapped at Tsuneishi in May 1961.

== Joseph Henry ==
Joseph Henry was built by Kaiser Company. She was delivered in February 1943. She was scrapped at San Francisco in March 1960.

== Joseph Hewes ==
Joseph Hewes was built by North Carolina Shipbuilding Company. Her keel was laid on 22 September 1941. She was launched on 29 March 1942 and delivered on 6 May. She was scrapped at New Orleans in September 1968.

== Joseph H. Hollister ==
Joseph H. Hollister was built by California Shipbuilding Corporation. Her keel was laid on 7 December 1942. She was launched on 5 January 1943 and delivered on 20 January. She was scrapped at Panama City, Florida in April 1966.

== Joseph H. Kibbey ==
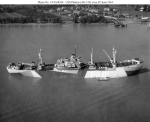
USS Phobos

Joseph H. Kibbey was built by Todd Houston Shipbuilding Corporation. Her keel was laid on 25 September 1943. She was launched on 6 November and delivered on 17 November. To the United States Army Transportation Service. Converted by Todd-Johnson Drydocks, New Orleans to a troop transport. Reassigned to the United States Navy and renamed Phobos. Returned to WSA in March 1946 and renamed Joseph H. Kibbey. She was scrapped at Oakland in May 1970.

== Joseph H. Martin ==
Joseph H. Martin was built by Southeastern Shipbuilding Corporation. Her keel was laid on 30 August 1943. She was launched on 18 October and delivered on 30 October. Laid up in the James River post-war, she was scrapped at Kearny in February 1972.

== Joseph H. Nicholson ==
Joseph H. Nicholson was a limited troop carrier built by Bethlehem Fairfield Shipyard. Her keel was laid on 3 May 1943. She was launched on 30 May and delivered on 10 June. Built for the WSA, she was operated under the management of Wessel, Duval & Co. Sold in 1947 to Compania Continental de Vapores, Panama and renamed Jules Fribourg. Sold later that year to Continental Carriersd Corp., Panama. Sold in 1948 to South Pacific Maritime Co. and renamed Pacific Wave. Operated under the management of Los Perzas Shipping Agency. Management transferred to Paular Maritime Co. in 1955. Sold in 1957 to Tslaviris Ltd., London and renamed Marianthe. Sold in 1958 to Nigean Shipping Co., Panama and renamed Free Merchant. Reflagged to Liberia and operated under the management of her previous owner. Sold in 1959 to Tsavliris Maritime Ltd. and renamed Fotini Tsavliris. Reflagged to Greece, remaining under the same management. Sold in 1960 to Compagnia Baleniera Italiana, Palermo and renamed Euro. Operated under the management of Fratelli d'Amico. Sold for scrapping in July 1968, she was scrapped at Trieste in December 1971.

== Joseph Holt ==
Joseph Holt was built by Permanente Metals Corporation. Her keel was laid on 15 October 1942. She was launched on 20 November and delivered on 28 November. She ran aground at Buckner Bay, Okinawa, in a typhoon in 1945. She was subsequently fitted with a remote control engine room by the United States Navy for use as a minesweeper for pressure mines. She was scrapped at Yokosuka in April 1961.

== Joseph Hooker ==
Joseph Hooker was built by Permanente Metals Corporation. Her keel was laid on 2 March 1942. She was launched on 20 June and delivered on 8 July. She was scrapped at Portland, Oregon in October 1967.

== Joseph I. Kemp ==
Joseph I. Kemp was built by New England Shipbuilding Corporation. Her keel was laid on 5 April 1944. She was launched on 16 May and delivered on 26 May. Built for the WSA, she was operated under the management of American Liberty Steamship Co. Management transferred to Lykes Brothers Steamship Company in 1946. Sold in 1949 to Whitehall Steamship Corp., New York and renamed Sea Leader. Sold in 1956 to Amerocean Steamship Co. and renamed Chelsea. Operated under the management of North Atlantic Marine Co. Sold later that year to Polarus Steamship Co. and renamed Adolph Sperling. Sold in 1961 to Cargo Ship & Tankers Inc., New York and renamed Cyclone. Reflagged to Liberia. Lengthened at Tokyo to 511 feet 6 inches (155.91 m). Now 8,508 GRT. Sold in 1966 to Mystras Compania Navigation, Panama and renamed Mystras. Remaining under the Liberian flag and operated under the management of National Shipping & Trading Corp. She ran aground off the Elbe Lightship on 29 June 1966 whilst on a voyage from Chimbote, Peru to Rostock, East Germany. She was refloated and towed in to Cuxhaven, West Germany, then to Rostock. Declared a constructive total loss, she was scrapped at Santander in October 1966.

== Josephine Shaw Lovell ==
Josephine Shaw Lovell was built by J. A. Jones Construction Company, Panama City. Her keel was laid on 19 February 1944. She was launched on 4 April and delivered on 3 May. Built for the WSA, she was operated under the management of Luckenbach Steamship Co. Sold in 1947 to Società Italiana di Navigazione Albaro, Genoa and renamed Albaro. Reported sold for scrapping in 1960, but stern section joined to fore section of Liberty ship Priaruggia. Now 511 feet 6 inches (155.91 m) long and 8,481 GRT. Sold in 1963 to Industria Marittima, Genoa. Sold later that year to Aegean Compania Navigation, Panama and renamed Aigaion. Reflagged to Greece and operated under the management of Phoenix Maritime Agencies. She was scrapped at Osaka in September 1968.

== Joseph Jefferson ==
Joseph Jefferson was built by Oregon Shipbuilding Corporation. Her keel was laid on 16 November 1942. She was launched on 11 December and delivered on 19 December. She was scrapped at Yokosuka in February 1961.

== Joseph J. Kinyoun ==
Joseph J. Kinyoun was built by Permanente Metals Corporation. Her keel was laid on 3 February 1944. She was launched on 22 February and delivered on 29 February. Built for the WSA, she was operated under the management of Weyerhaeuser Steamship Co. To the French Government in 1947 and renamed Granville. Operated under the management of Compagnia Nantaise des Chargeurs de l'Ouest. Sold in 1961 to Granikos Shipping Corp. and renamed Granikos. Reflagged to Lebanon and operated under the management of General Marine Agency. Management transferred to Orizon Shipping Co. in 1962. She ran aground on the Buffalo Rock, off Pulo Sambu, Indonesia on 19 September 1966 whilst on a voyage from a Chinese port to Chittagong, East Pakistan. She was refloated on 21 September and towed to Singapore, where she was laid up. She was scrapped at Hong Kong in March 1968.

== Joseph K. Toole ==
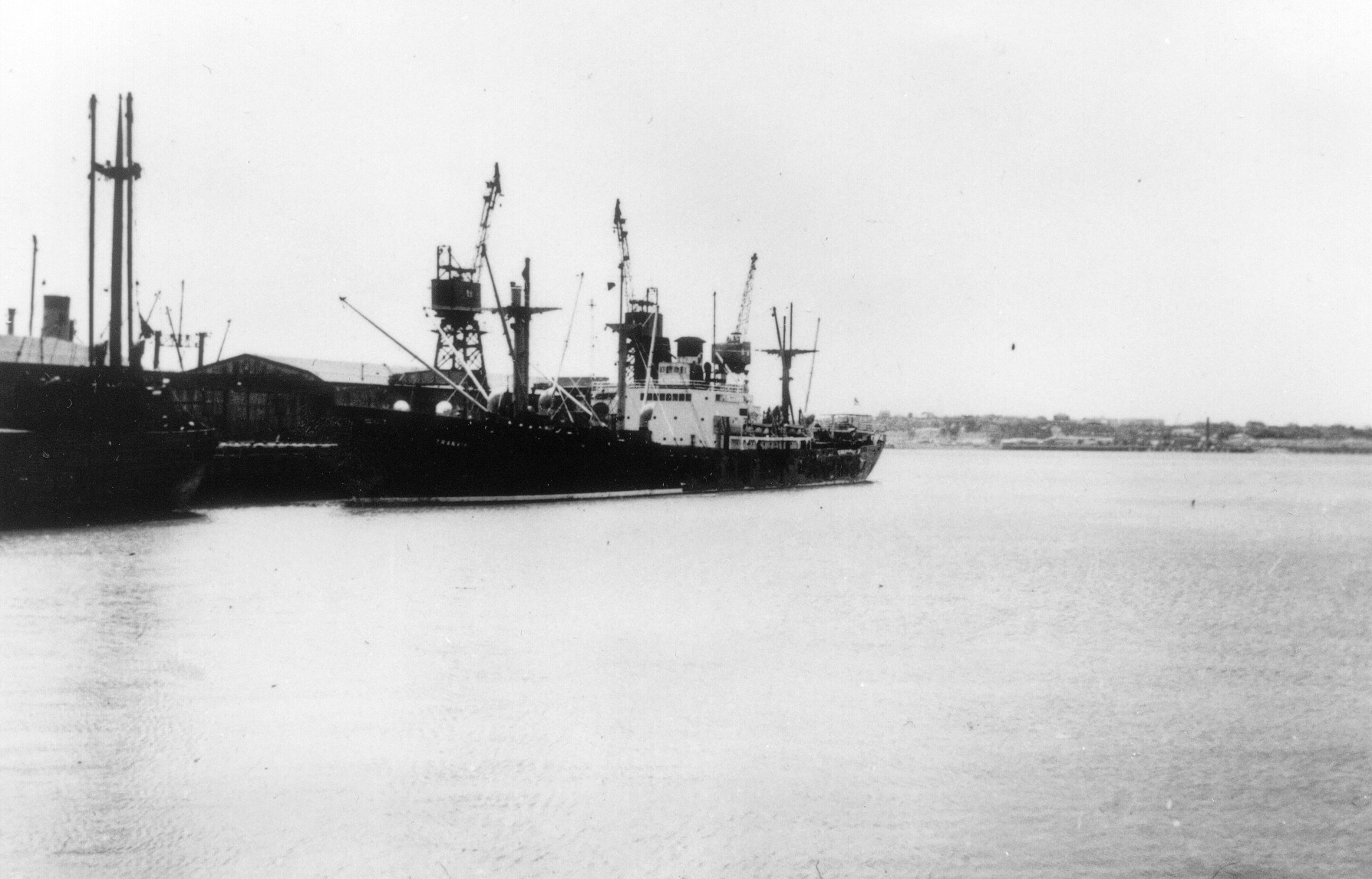
Tranvik

Joseph K. Toole was built by Permanente Metals Corporation. Her keel was laid on 17 July 1943. She was launched on 8 August and delivered on 22 August. Built for the WSA, she was operated under the management of Agwilines Inc. Sold in 1947 to Helsingfors Steamship Co., Helsinki, Finland and renamed Tranvik. Operated under the management of A/B Benima O/Y. Sold in 1950 to Rederibolaget Tranvik and placed under the management of Curt Mattson. Sold in 1954 to Società per Azioni Emanuele V. Parodi, Genoa and renamed Marina Gabriella Parodo. Renamed Marina G. Parodi in 1955. She was scrapped at La Spezia in September 1965.

== Joseph Lane ==
Joseph Lane was built by Oregon Shipbuilding Corporation. Her keel was laid on 31 May 1942. She was launched on 14 July and delivered on 27 July. She was scrapped at Tacoma in February 1966.

== Joseph Le Conte ==
Joseph Le Conte was built by North Carolina Shipbuilding Company. Her keel was laid on 22 May 1943. She was launched on 17 June and delivered on 23 June. Built for the WSA, she was operated under the management of Moore McCormack Lines. Sold in 1946 to Compania de Navigation Delmore and renamed Panamante. Reflagged to Panama and operated under the management of Delmore Corp. Management transferred to Marfin Management Trust in 1962. Sold in 1965 to Elie A. Carapiperis & Sons, Beirut, Lebanon and renamed Tony. She was scrapped at Split, Yugoslavia in March 1971.

== Joseph Lee ==
Joseph Lee was built by New England Shipbuilding Corporation. Her keel was laid on 18 October 1944. She was launched on 3 December and delivered on 16 December. She was scrapped at Portland, Oregon in October 1964.

== Joseph Leidy ==
Joseph Leidy was built by Bethlehem Fairfield Shipyard. Her keel was laid on 27 March 1943. She was launched on 30 April and delivered on 10 May. Built for the WSA, she was operated under the management of Stockard Steamship Corp. Sold in 1946 to Society Armadora Aristomenis and renamed Aristomenis. Reflagged to Panama and operated under the management of Simon, Spence & Young. Management transferred to Constantine Konialidis in 1948. Sold later that year to Miramar Sociètè Anonyme, Montevideo and renamed Mario C. Reflagged to Honduras. Sold in 1951 to Springville Steamship Corp., Panama and renamed Ocean Ranger. Remaining under the Honduran flag. Reflagged to Liberia in 1953. Sold in 1963 to Norland Shipping & Trading Corp., New York. She was scrapped at Hirao in October 1966.

== Joseph L. Meek ==
Joseph L. Meek was a limited troop carrier built by Oregon Shipbuilding Corporation. Her keel was laid on 20 October 1942. She was launched on 16 November and delivered on 26 November. Laid up at Mobile post-war, she was scuttled off Pensacola, Florida on 5 November 1976.

== Joseph M. Carey ==
Joseph M. Carey was built by Oregon Shipbuilding Corporation. Her keel was laid on 25 September 1943. She was launched on 13 October and delivered on 21 October. Laid up at Beaumont post-war, she was scrapped at Brownsville in July 1972.

== Joseph McKenna ==
Joseph McKenna was built by California Shipbuilding Corporation. Her keel was laid on 16 April 1942. She was launched on 12 June and delivered on 30 June. She was scrapped at Baltimore in May 1962.

== Joseph M. Medill ==
Joseph M. Medill was built by J. A. Jones Construction Company, Panama City. Her keel was laid on 28 September 1942. She was launched on 3 May and delivered on 31 May. She was scrapped at Baltimore in June 1960.

== Joseph M. Terrell ==
Joseph M. Terrell was built by J. A. Jones Construction Company, Brunswick. Her keel was laid on 23 December 1943. She was launched on 14 February 1944 and delivered on 26 February. She was scrapped at Panama City, Florida in June 1966.

== Joseph Murgas ==
Joseph Murgas was built by Southeastern Shipbuilding Corporation. Her keel was laid on 1 September 1944. She was launched on 12 October and delivered on 28 October. Laid up in the James River post-war, she was scrapped at Philadelphia in November 1972.

== Joseph N. Dinand ==
Joseph N. Dinand was built by New England Shipbuilding Corporation. Her keel was laid on 8 June 1944. She was launched on 29 July and delivered on 12 August. Built for the WSA, she was operated under the management of States Marine Corp., New York. Sold to her managers in 1947 and renamed Wolverine State. Sold in 1954 to Omnium Steamship Co. and renamed Omnium Trader. Reflagged to Liberia and operated under the management of Omnium Freighting Corp. Management transferred to Omnium Agencies Co. in 1957. Sold in 1958 to Compania Navigation Honduras and renamed Dana. Reflagged to Liberia and operated under the management of Grauds Shipping Co., Fort Lauderdale, Florida. Sold to her managers in 1959 and renamed Pacific Venture. Sold in 1960 to Consolidated Mariners Inc. and renamed Village. Remaining under the American flag. Returned to the American Government in 1963 in exchange for the Victory ship Bartlesville Victory. She was transferred to the United States Navy and scuttled off the east coast of the United States on 17 September 1964.

== Joseph N. Nicollet ==
Joseph N. Nicollet was built by Delta Shipbuilding Company. Her keel was laid on 22 April 1943. She was launched on 24 May and delivered on 11 June. She was scrapped at Baltimore in 1959.

== Joseph N. Teal ==
Joseph N. Teal was built by Oregon Shipbuilding Corporation. Her keel was laid on 13 September 1942. She was launched on 23 September and delivered on 26 September. She was scrapped at Panama City, Florida in 1963.

== Joseph P. Bradley ==
Joseph P. Bradley was built by Bethlehem Fairfield Shipyard. Her keel was laid on 17 March 1943. She was launched on 17 April and delivered on 27 April. Built for the WSA, she was operated under the management of Grace Lines Inc. Management transferred to Fribourg Steamship Corp. in 1948. Sold in 1949 to Arrow Steamship Co., New York and renamed Jules Fribourg. Sold in 1950 to Terminal Steamship Co., New York and renamed Lumber Carrier. Operated under the management of A. L. Burbank & Co. Sold in 1959 to Seafaith Steamship Co. and renamed Mount Whitney. Remained under the American flag and operated under the management of Suwannee Steamship Co. Laid up at Karachi in 1962, she was scrapped there in 1964.

== Joseph Priestly ==
Joseph Priestly was built by California Shipbuilding Corporation. Her keel was laid on 25 May 1943. She was launched on 17 June and delivered on 28 June. Laid up in Puget Sound post-war, she was scrapped at Tacoma in November 1970.

== Joseph Pulitzer ==
Joseph Pulitzer was built by California Shipbuilding Corporation. Her keel was laid on 10 August 1942. She was launched on 18 September and delivered on 6 October. Laid up in the James River post-war, she was scrapped at Gandia in January 1973.

== Joseph Reynolds ==
Joseph Reynolds was built by California Shipbuilding Corporation. Her keel was laid on 23 July 1943. She was launched on 16 August and delivered on 31 August. She was scrapped at Portland, Oregon in May 1959.

== Joseph R. Lamar ==
Joseph R. Lamar was built by J. A. Jones Construction Company, Brunswick. Her keel was laid on 1 August 1942. She was launched on 29 April 1943 and delivered on 17 June. Built for the WSA, she was operated under the management of Agwilines Inc. She was scrapped at Mobile in March 1961.

== Joseph Rodman Drake ==
Joseph Rodman Drake was built by Permanente Metals Corporation. Her keel was laid on 20 June 1942. She was launched on 21 August and delivered on 25 September. Laid up in the James River post-war, she was scrapped at Kearny in August 1972.

== Joseph S. Emery ==
Joseph S. Emery was built by Permanente Metals Corporation. Her keel was laid on 8 May 1943. She was launched on 31 May and delivered on 13 June. She was scrapped at Jersey City in June 1960.

== Joseph Simon ==
Joseph Simon was built by Oregon Shipbuilding Corporation. Her keel was laid on 20 July 1943. She was launched on 8 August and delivered on 16 August. She was scrapped at Baltimore in June 1960.

== Joseph S. McDonagh ==
Joseph S. McDonagh was built by Southeastern Shipbuilding Corporation. Her keel was laid on 14 September 1944. She was launched on 27 October and delivered on 11 November. She was built for the WSA. She was driven ashore at the mouth of the Cañete River, Peru on 31 March 1946 whilst on a voyage from Talcahuano, Chile to Le Havre, France and was a total loss.

== Joseph Smith ==
Joseph Smith was built by Permanente Metals Corporation. Her keel was laid on 28 Aprilb 1943. She was launched on 22 May and delivered on 4 June. Built for the WSA, she was operated under the management of Alaska Packers Association. She was abandoned in the Atlantic Ocean (44°30′N 43°10′W) on 11 January 1944 after he hull cracked whilst on a voyage from Liverpool to New York. She was scuttled by a Royal Navy warship.

== Joseph Squires ==
Joseph Squires was built by New England Shipbuilding Corporation. Her keel was laid on 12 April 1944. She was launched on 22 May and delivered on 31 May. Laid up in Suisun Bay post-war, she was scrapped at Oakland in February 1969.

== Joseph Stanton ==
Joseph Stanton was built by Bethlehem Fairfield Shipyard. Her keel was laid on 2 May 1942. She was launched on 4 July and delivered on 18 July. She was scrapped at Philadelphia in 1964.

== Joseph Story ==
Joseph Story was built by California Shipbuilding Corporation. Her keel was laid on 9 September 1942. She was launched on 15 October and delivered on 3 November. She was scrapped at Kearny in 1960.

== Joseph T. Robinson ==
Joseph T. Robinson was built by Todd Houston Shipbuilding Corporation. Her keel was laid on 17 November 1942. She was launched on 6 January 1943 and delivered on 16 January. She was scrapped at Panama City, Florida in April 1967.

== Joseph V. Connolly ==
Joseph V. Connolly was a boxed aircraft transport built by J. A. Jones Construction Company, Panama City. Her keel was laid on 25 May 1945. She was launched on 9 July and delivered on 8 August. To the United States Army in 1946. She caught fire in the Atlantic Ocean 900 nautical miles (1,700 km) east of New York on 12 January 1948 whilst on a voyage from New York to J, Belgium. Taken in tow by a tug on 24 January, but the tow parted and she sank at 40°47′N 52°48′W.

== Joseph Warren ==
Joseph Warren was a limited troop carrier built by New England Shipbuilding Corporation. Her keel was laid on 1 February 1943. She was launched on 5 April and delivered on 17 April. Built for the WSA, she was operated under the management of Wessel, Duval & Co. Sold in 1947 to Anthony D. Stathatos, Athens and renamed Maria Stathatos. Sold inn 1960 to G. N. Stathatos. Operated under the management of Stathatos & Co. Sold in 1965 to Deko Trading SA, Panama and renamed Albatros. Reflagged to Liberia and operated under the management of Olympic Maritime SA. Sold in 1967 to Cabos Hornos Maritima, Panama. Remaining under the Liberian flag and operated under the management of Central American Steamship Agency. She was scrapped at Vado Ligure in October 1969.

== Joseph Watt ==
Joseph Watt was built by Oregon Shipbuilding Corporation. Her keel was laid on 15 June 1943. She was launched as Joseph Watt on 4 July and delivered as Erevan on 13 July. Transferred to the Soviet Union. Delivered to a shipyard at Vladivostok for scrapping in May 1975.

== Joseph Weydemeyer ==
Joseph Weydemeyer was built by Delta Shipbuilding Company. Her keel was laid on 3 October 1944. She was launched on 11 November and delivered on 30 November. She was scrapped at New Orleans in November 1961.

== Joseph W. Folk ==
Joseph W. Folk was built by Oregon Shipbuilding Corporation. Her keel was laid on 12 August 1943. She was launched on 1 September and delivered on 7 September. She was scrapped at Kearny in December 1970.

== Joseph Wheeler ==
Joseph Wheeler was built by Alabama Drydock Company. She was delivered on 31 October 1942. Built for the WSA, she was operated under the management of South Atlantic Steamship Co. She was sunk in an air raid on Bari on 2 December 1943. Her wreck was sold to shipbreakers in Genoa in 1948.

== Jose Sepulvedra ==
Jose Sepulvedra was built by California Shipbuilding Corporation. Her keel was laid on 10 April 1942. She was launched on 2 May and delivered on 15 May. To the Soviet Union under Lend-Lease and renamed Suchan. Renamed Partizansk in 1977, converted to a storage ship. Listed as "non-seagoing" c.1977.

== Joshua A. Leach ==
Joshua A. Leach was built by Todd Houston Shipbuilding Corporation. Her keel was laid on 7 August 1943. She was launched on 24 September and delivered on 6 October. Built for the WSA, she was operated under the management of A. H. Bull & Co. Sold in 1947 to Theofano Maritime Co. and renamed Evros. Reflagged to Greece and operated under the management of Livanos. Management transferred to Livanos Shipbrokers Ltd. in 1953. Sold in 1961 to Prekookeanska Plovidba Bar and renamed Bar. Reflagged to Yugoslavia. She ran aground off Split on 17 February 1967 whilst on a voyage from Split to Augusta, Sicily. She was declared a constructive total loss and sold for scrapping on 27 February 1967.

== Joshua B. Lippincott ==
Joshua B. Lippincott was built by Bethlehem Fairfield Shipyard. Her keel was laid on 16 November 1943. She was launched on 5 December and delivered on 15 December. Laid up in the Hudson River post-war, she was scrapped at Kearny in April 1971.

== Joshua Hendy ==
Joshua Hendy was built by Permanente Metals Corporation. Her keel was laid on 24 June 1943. She was launched on 20 July and delivered on 31 July. She was scrapped at Kearny in November 1964.

== Joshua L. Chamberlin ==
Joshua L. Chamberlin was built by New England Shipbuilding Corporation. Her keel was laid on 27 April 1943. She was launched on 14 June and delivered on 27 June. She was scrapped at New Orleans in November 1966.

== Joshua Seney ==
Joshua Seney was built by Delta Shipbuilding Company. Her keel was laid on 9 August 1942. She was launched on 9 October and delivered on 29 October. She was scrapped at New Orleans in May 1962.

== Joshua Slocum ==
Joshua Slocum

Joshua Slocum was built by New England Shipbuilding Corporation. Her keel was laid on 4 November 1944. She was launched on 17 December and delivered on 23 December. She was scrapped at Portland, Oregon in August 1965.

== Joshua Thomas ==
Joshua Thomas was built by Bethlehem Fairfield Shipyard. Her keel was laid on 10 July 1943. She was launched on 5 August and delivered on 13 August. Laid up at Beaumont post-war. She was scuttled off South Padre Island, Texas in November 1975.

== Joshua W. Alexander ==
Joshua W. Alexander was built by Bethlehem Fairfield Shipyard. Her keel was laid on 22 May 1943. She was launched on 19 June and delivered on 30 June. She was driven ashore at The Graves, Massachusetts on 17 October 1945 whilst on a voyage from Searsport, Maine to Boston. She was refloated and subsequently scrapped in the United States.

== Josiah Bartlett ==
Josiah Bartlett was built by New England Shipbuilding Corporation. Her keel was laid on 18 May 1942. She was launched on 27 September and delivered on 8 October. She was scrapped at Terminal Island in October 1967.

== Josiah B. Grinnell ==
Josiah B. Grinnell was built by Permanente Metals Corporation. Her keel was laid on 29 January 1943. She was launched on 4 March and delivered on 17 March. She was scrapped at Terminal Island in August 1966.

== Josiah Cohen ==
Josiah Cohen was built by Southeastern Shipbuilding Corporation. Her keel was laid on 13 October 1944. She was launched on 23 November and delivered on 8 December. Built for the WSA, she was operated under the management of Overseas Freight Corp. To the United States War Department in 1946. Sold in 1947 to Kassos Steam Navigation Co., Syra, Greece and renamed Themoni. Operated under the management of Rethymnis & Kulukundis. Sold in 1961 to A. Frangistas and renamed Nicolaos Frangistas. Operated under the management of Franco Shipping Co. Renamed Nicolaos F. in 1964. Sold in 1969 to Kounistra Shipping Co. and renamed Kounistra. Reflagged to Cyprus, remaining under the same management. She was scrapped at Valencia in September 1972.

== Josiah D. Whitney ==
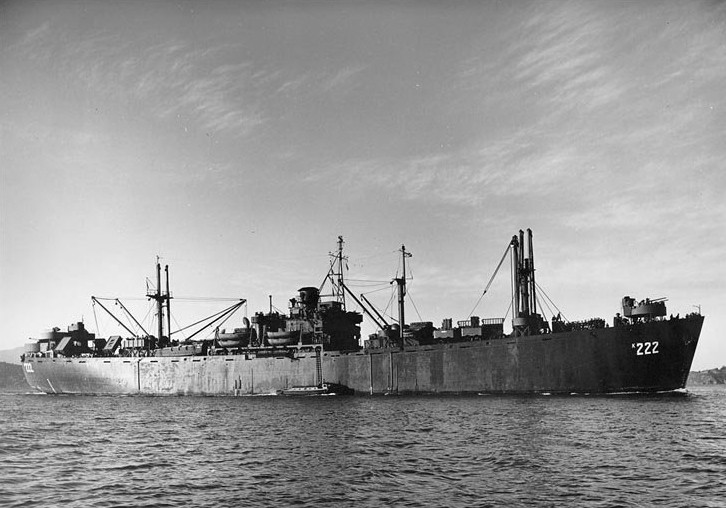
USS Livingston

Josiah D. Whitney was built by California Shipbuilding Corporation. Her keel was laid on 22 March 1943. She was launched on 16 April and delivered on 28 April. To the United States Navy in October 1943, renamed Livingston. Returned to WSA in February 1946 and renamed Josiah D. Whitney. Laid up in reserve in Suisun Bay. She was sold in February 1973 for scrapping at Kaohsiung.

== Josiah Earl ==
Josiah Earl was built by California Shipbuilding Corporation. Her keel was laid on 4 May 1943. She was launched on 27 May and delivered on 9 June. Built for the WSA, she was operated under the management of Hammond Shipping Co. Sold on 19 July 1947 to Ringdals Rederi, Oslo and renamed Gregers Gram. New FIAT diesel engine fitted at La Spezia in 1953. Sold in 1960 to Compania Okeania de Navigation, Panama and renamed Thalis. Reflagged to Liberia and operated under the management of Pateras Shipbrokers. Management transferred to Poseidon Shipping Agencies in 1964. Sold in 1067 to North Star Shipping Co. Reflagged to Cyprus, remaining under the same management. Sold in 1968 to Tai Ping Steam Navigation Co. and renamed Taishunhong. Reflagged to Somalia and operated under the management of Shun Cheong Steam Navigation Co. Damaged by fire at Dairen, China in January 1969 and declared a constructive total loss. She was scrapped at Hirao in June 1969.

== Josiah G. Holland ==
Josiah G. Holland was a tanker built by California Shipbuilding Corporation. She was completed in October 1943. Built for the WSA, she was operated under the management of American Republics Corp. Sold in 1948 to Phoenix Steamship Corp. and renamed Cygnet III. Operated under the management of Orion Shipping & Trading Co. Converted to a cargo ship at Baltimore in 1949. Sold in 1954 to Piamonte Compania Navigation and renamed Ekaterini G. Reflagged to Panama, remaining under the same management. Reflagged to Liberia in 1955. Sold in 1961 to Importers Shipping Corp. Reflagged to Greece and operated under the management of Capeside Steamship Co. She lost her propeller 700 nautical miles (1,300 km) south west of Midway Island on 17 October 1965. She was taken in tow by USS Tawakoni but broke free and grounded on Great Sitkin Island, Alaska. She subsequently broke up and was a total loss.

== Josiah Nelson Cushing ==
Josiah Nelson Cushing was built by California Shipbuilding Corporation. Her keel was laid on 16 April 1943. She was launched on 8 May and delivered on 21 May. She was scrapped at Portland, Oregon in December 1967.

== Josiah Parker ==
Josiah Parker was built by Delta Shipbuilding Company. Her keel was laid on 16 July 1942. She was launched on 26 September and delivered on 21 October. Built for the WSA, she was operated under the management of Mississippi Shipping Co. To the French Government in 1947 and renamed Epinal. Operated under the management of Sociètè Nationale d'Affrêtements. Management transferred to Compagnie Havraise de Navigation à Vapeur in 1950. Sold in 1963 to Margalante Compania Navigation, Panama and renamed Deka. Reflagged to Liberia and operated under the management of Mavroleon Bros. She was scrapped at Aioi, Japan in May 1964.

== Josiah Quincy ==
Josiah Quincy was built by New England Shipbuilding Corporation. Her keel was laid on 8 June 1943. She was launched on 28 July and delivered on 16 August. Laid up in the James River post-war, she was scrapped at Castellón de la Plana in September 1972.

== Josiah Royce ==
Josiah Royce was built by California Shipbuilding Corporation. Her keel was laid on 20 January 1943. She was launched on 16 February and delivered on 6 March. She was scrapped at New Orleans in September 1966.

== Josiah Snelling ==
Josiah Snelling was built by Permanente Metals Corporation. Her keel was laid on 6 April 1943. She was launched on 30 April and delivered on 19 May. Built for the WSA, she was operated under the management of Sudden & Christensen. Damaged in a kamikaze attack at Okinawa on 27 May 1945. Repaired at San Francisco. Laid up in reserve post-war. She was scrapped at Tampa in July 1961.

== Josiah Tattnall ==
Josiah Tattnall was built by Southeastern Shipbuilding Corporation. Her keel was laid on 23 September 1944. She was launched on 3 November and delivered on 18 November. She was scrapped at Bilbao in September 1970.

== Joyce Kilmer ==
Joyce Kilmer was built by Bethlehem Fairfield Shipyard. Her keel was laid on 7 September 1943. She was launched on 1 October and delivered on 9 October. She was scrapped at Terminal Island in January 1968.

== J. Pinckney Henderson ==
J. Pinckney Henderson was built by Todd Houston Shipbuilding Corporation. Her keel was laid on 28 May 1943. She was launched on 6 July and delivered on 23 July. Built for the WSA, she was operated under the management of United Fruit Company. On her maiden voyage, she collided with the Panamanian tanker J. H. Senior off the coast of Newfoundland (44°12′N 53°58′W) on 18 August 1943 and caught fire. She was towed in to Sydney, Dominion of Canada on 31 August, still burning. The fire was extinguished more than three weeks later. She was refloated on 14 January 1944 and towed to New York. Declared a constructive total loss, she was scrapped at Philadelphia in July 1944.

== J. Rufino Barrios ==
J. Rufino Barrios was built by Delta Shipbuilding Company. Her keel was laid on 22 August 1944. She was launched on 2 October and delivered on 7 November. She was scrapped at Portland, Oregon in November 1967.

== J. S. Cullinan ==
J. S. Cullinan was built by Todd Houston Shipbuilding Corporation. Her keel was laid on 5 October 1943. She was launched on 13 November and delivered on 25 November. To the United States Navy and renamed Alderamin. Returned to WSA in March 1946 and renamed J. S. Cullinan. Laid up in Suisun Bay. She was scrapped in the United States c.1965.

== J. S. Hutchinson ==
J. S. Hutchinson was built by Permanente Metals Corporation. Her keel was laid on 4 March 1944. She was launched on 27 March and delivered on 31 March. She was scrapped at Mobile in November 1964.

== J. Sterling Morton ==
J. Sterling Morton was built by Permanente Metals Corporation. Her keel was laid on 11 November 1942. She was launched on 15 December and delivered on 24 December. Built for the WSA, she was laid up in the Hudson River post-war. She was scrapped at Valencia in May 1971.

== Juan Bautista de Anza ==
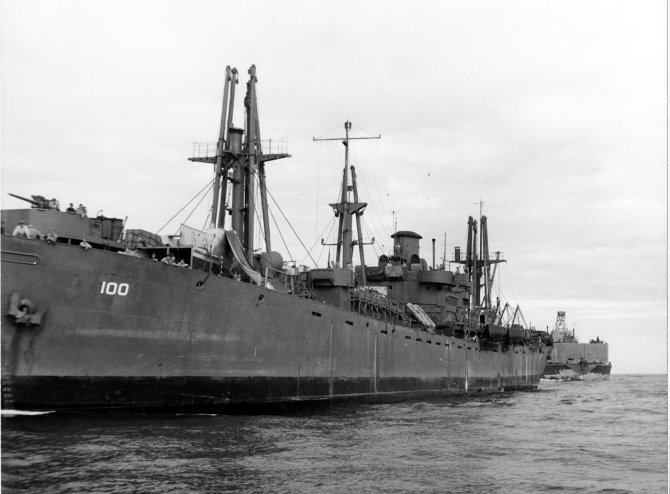
USS Lynx

Juan Bautista de Anza was built by California Shipbuilding Corporation. Her keel was laid on 26 April 1943. She was launched as Juan Bautista de Anza on 18 May and delivered to the United States Navy as Lynx on 30 May. Returned to the WSA in November 1945 and renamed Juan Bautista de Anza. Laid up in Suisun Bay. She was scrapped at Portland, Oregon in November 1972.

== Juan Cabrillo ==
Juan Cabrillo was built by California Shipbuilding Corporation. Her keel was laid on 9 May 1942. She was launched on 27 June and delivered on 19 July. She was scrapped at Everett, Washington in April 1961.

== Juan de Fuca ==
Juan de Fuca was built by Kaiser Company. She was delivered in January 1943. Built for the WSA, she was operated under the management of Weyerhauser Steamship Co. Damaged by a Kamikaze attack in the Pacific Ocean on 21 December 1944 whilst on a voyage from Leyte to Mindoro. She was then damaged off Ambolini Island by an aerial torpedo on 30 December and was beached. She was further damaged in April 1945 by air raids. Subsequently refloated and towed to Subic Bay. To the United States Navy in September 1945 and renamed Araner Returned to USMC in October 1946 and renamed Juan de Fuca. Sold to Shangai shipbreakers in 1950. Intercepted by Chinese Nationalist Navy warships 180 nautical miles (330 km) north of Keelung on 26 September 1950 whilst under tow by the tug Margaret Moller on a voyage from Hong Kong to Shanghai. She was ordered to be cast adrift (28°05′N 123°00′E). No further trace, presumed foundered in the Formosa Strait.

== Juan Flaco Brown ==
Juan Flaco Brown was built by California Shipbuilding Corporation. Her keel was laid on 16 March 1943. She was launched on 12 April and delivered on 24 April. She was scrapped at Everett in July 1961.

=== Juan N. Seguin ===
Juan N. Seguin was built by Todd Houston Shipbuilding Corporation. Her keel was laid on 26 April 1944. She was launched on 31 May and delivered on 12 June. She was scrapped at New Orleans in September 1966.

== Juan Pablo Duarte ==
Juan Pablo Duarte was built by Permanente Metals Corporation. Her keel was laid on 5 February 1944. She was launched on 23 February and delivered on 29 February. Built for the WSA, she was operated under the management of Sudden & Christensen. Sold in 1947 to Società di Navigazione Italia, Genoa and renamed Etna. She was scrapped at Palermo in June 1963.

== Jubal A. Early ==
Jubal A. Early was built by Todd Houston Shipbuilding Corporation. Her keel was laid on 6 February 1943. She was launched on 19 March and delivered on 8 April. Built for the WSA, she was operated under the management of Lykes Brothers Steamship Company. Sold in 1947 to E. Kulukundis, Piraeus and renamed Nicholaos G. Kulukundis. Sold in 1950 to Atlanticos Steamship Co. Operated under the management of Kulukundis Shipping Co. Sold in 1964 to Greek Shipping Enterprises, Panama and renamed Captain Nicolas. Remaining under the Greek flag and operated under the management of Rethymnis Shipping Agency. She was scrapped at Shodoshima, Japan in June 1968.

== Judah P. Benjamin ==
Judah P. Benjamin was built by Alabama Drydock Company. She was delivered on 15 August 1942. She was scrapped at Tacoma in 1961.

== Judah Touro ==
Judah Touro was a tanker built by Delta Shipbuilding Company. Her keel was laid on 20 October 1943. She was launched as Mink on 5 December and delivered on 15 January 1944. Built for the United States Navy. Returned to WSA in June 1946 and renamed Judah Touro. Laid up in the James River. Sold in 1951 to Cape Horn Steamship Corp. and renamed Seavalor. Operated under the management of Orion Shipping & Trading Co. Sold in 1952 to Isla Verde Compania Navigation and renamed Apikia. Reflagged to Panama, remaining under the same management. Converted to a cargo ship at Greenock, United Kingdom in 1955. Renamed Eleni V. Sold in 1960 to Tasmania Shipping Corp. Reflagged to Greece, remaining under the same management. Management transferred to Global Charting Inc. in 1964. She was scrapped at Sakaide in September 1967.

== Julia L. Dumont ==
Julia L. Dumont was built by Permanente Metals Corporation. Her keel was laid on 2 December 1943. She was launched on 20 December and delivered on 29 December. She was scrapped at Portland, Oregon in April 1966.

== Julian W. Mack ==
Julian W. Mack was built by California Shipbuilding Corporation. Her keel was laid on 12 December 1943. She was launched on 7 January 1944 and delivered on 24 January. Built for the WSA, she was operated under the management of American President Lines. Sold in 1947 to Compania Maritima Samsoc Ltda. and renamed Andreas. Reflagged to Panama and operated under the management of Fred Hunter Ltd. Sold in 1955 to Esperanza Compania Navigation and renamed Despo. Operated under the management of Carras Ltd. Management transferred to Interocean Tramping Ltd in 1961, then reverted to Carras Ltd. in 1965. Sold in 1967 to Valmaseda Compania Navigation and renamed Dante. Operated under the management of J. H. Winchester & Co. She was scrapped at Sakaide in February 1969.

== Julia P. Shaw ==
Julia P. Shaw was built by New England Shipbuilding Corporation. Her keel was laid on 4 November 1944. She was launched on 17 December and delivered on 29 December. She was scrapped at Mobile in August 1964.

== Julia Ward Howe ==
Julia Ward Howe was built by New England Shipbuilding Corporation. Her keel was laid on 8 September 1942. She was launched on 26 November and delivered on 23 December. Built for the WSA, she was operated under the management of American West African Line. She was torpedoed and damaged in the Atlantic Ocean south of the Azores (35°29′N 29°10′W) by U-442 on 27 January 1943 whilst on a voyage from New York to Oran. She was torpedoed again, broke in two and sank.

== Julien Dubuque ==
Julien Dubuque was built by Permanente Metals Corporation. Her keel was laid on 9 January 1943. She was launched on 16 February and delivered on 26 February. Laid up at Mobile post-war, she was scrapped at Panama City, Florida in November 1971.

== Julien Poydras ==
Julien Poydras was built by Delta Shipbuilding Company. Her keel was laid on 11 April 1943. She was launched on 17 May and delivered on 29 May. Laid up in the James River post-war, she was scrapped at Bilbao in May 1971.

== Juliette Low ==
Juliette Low was built by Southeastern Shipbuilding Corporation. Her keel was laid on 15 March 1944. She was launched on 12 May and delivered on 29 May. Laid up at Beaumont post-war, she was scrapped at Brownsville in April 1972.

== Julius Olsen ==
Julius Olsen was built by Todd Houston Shipbuilding Corporation. Her keel was laid on 6 March 1944. She was launched on 14 April and delivered on 26 April. Built for the WSA, she was operated under the management of A. H. Bull & Co. Management transferred to States Marine Corp., New York in 1946. Sold to her managers in 1947 and renamed Blue Grass State. Sold in 1955 to Alba Steamship Corp., New York and renamed Auburn. Sold in 1957 to Marshall Transportation Corp. and renamed Marshall. Reflagged to Liberia and operated under the management of Seaways Shipping Corp. Sold in 1961 to Marifortuna Naviera, Panama and renamed Mareileen. Remaining under the Liberian flag and operated under the management of Chandris Ltd. Suffered a structural failure in January 1967 whilst on a voyage from Vancouver to Ceylon. She put in to Osaka, where temporary repairs were made and she resumed her voyage. Sold to Japanese shipbreakers in March 1967, but subsequently resold. She was scrapped at Kaohsiung in December 1968.

== Julius Rosenwald ==
Julius Rosenwald was built by J. A. Jones Construction Company, Panama City. Her keel was laid on 7 July 1943. She was launched on 13 September and delivered on 29 September. Built for the WSA, she was operated under the management of Blidberg Rothchild Co. Sold in 1946 to Adriatica Società Anonime di Navigazione, Venice and renamed Assiria. Sold in 1954 to Società per Azioni Emanuele V. Parodi, Genoa and renamed Roberto Parodi. She ran aground on the Colorado Reefs, off the coast of Cuba, on 9 July 1962 whilst on a voyage from Tampa to Tokyo. She was refloated on 17 July and put in to Havana before completing her voyage. She was scrapped at Yokosuka in March 1963.

== Junipero Serra ==
Junipero Serra was built by California Shipbuilding Corporation. Her keel was laid on 20 May 1942. She was launched on 30 June and delivered on 23 July. She was scrapped at Seattle in February 1959.

== Junius Smith ==
Junius Smith was built by St. Johns River Shipbuilding Corporation. Her keel was laid on 11 October 1944. She was launched on 14 November and delivered on 22 November. She was scrapped at New Orleans in November 1965.

== Justin S. Morill ==
Justin S. Morill was built by Permanente Metals Corporation. Her keel was laid on 7 January 1943. She was launched on 13 February and delivered on 26 February. She was scrapped at Baltimore in February 1962.

== Justo Arosemena ==
Justo Arosemena was built by Permanente Metals Corporation. Her keel was laid on 7 June 1944. She was launched on 26 June and delivered on 6 July. She was scrapped at Seattle in July 1970.

== J. Warren Keifer ==
J. Warren Keifer was built by Oregon Shipbuilding Corporation. Her keel was laid on 6 October 1943. She was launched on 25 October and delivered on 2 November. She was scrapped at Philadelphia in 1961.

== J. Whitridge Williams ==
J. Whitridge Williams was built by Bethlehem Fairfield Shipyard. Her keel was laid on 25 September 1943. She was launched as J. Whitridge Williams on 17 October and delivered as Samsylvan on 27 October. To the Ministry of War Transport (MoWT) under Lend-Lease. Operated under the management of Shaw, Savill & Albion Co, London. Sold to her managers in 1947 and renamed Tropic. Sold in 1952 to San Francesco Società di Navigazione, Genoa, Italy and renamed San Francesco. Operated under the management of Angelo Scinicariello. She ran aground near Hainan Island, China on 30 January 1960 whilst on a voyage from Whampoa Dock to Yulin, China. She was refloated and sold for scrapping. She foundered in a typhoon at Hong Kong on 9 June 1960. Subsequently refloated and scrapped.

== J. Willard Gibbs ==
J. Willard Gibbs was built by New England Shipbuilding Corporation. Her keel was laid on 6 October 1943. She was launched on 21 November and delivered on 30 November. She was scrapped at Portland, Oregon in August 1967.
