= List of Liberty ships (R) =

This is a list of Liberty ships with names beginning with R.

== Description ==
The standard Liberty ship (EC-2-S-C1 type) was a cargo ship 441 feet 6 inches (134.57 m) long overall, with a beam of 56 feet 10 3/4 inches (17.34 m). It had a depth of 37 feet 4 inches (11.38 m) and a draft of 26 feet 10 inches (8.18 m). It was powered by a triple expansion steam engine, which had cylinders of 24 1/2 inches (62 cm), 37 inches (94 cm) and 70 inches (180 cm) diameter by 48 inches (120 cm) stroke. The engine produced 2,500ihp at 76rpm. Driving a four-blade propeller 18 feet 6 inches (5.64 m) in diameter, could propel the ship at 11 knots (20 km/h).

Cargo was carried in five holds, numbered 1–5 from bow to stern. Grain capacity was 84,183 cubic feet (2,383.8 m^{3}), 145,604 cubic feet (4,123.0 m^{3}), 96,429 cubic feet (2,730.6 m^{3}), 93,190 cubic feet (2,639 m^{3}) and 93,190 cubic feet (2,639 m^{3}), with a further 49,086 cubic feet (1,390.0 m^{3}) in the deep tanks. Bale capacity was 75,405 cubic feet (2,135.2 m^{3}), 134,638 cubic feet (3,812.5 m^{3}), 83,697 cubic feet (2,370.0 m^{3}), 82,263 cubic feet (2,329.4 m^{3}) and 82,435 cubic feet (2,334.3 m^{3}), with a further 41,135 cubic feet (1,164.8 m^{3}) in the deep tanks.

It carried a crew of 45, plus 36 United States Navy Armed Guard gunners. Later in the war, this was altered to a crew of 52, plus 29 gunners. Accommodation was in a three deck superstructure placed midships. The galley was equipped with a range, a 25 US gallons (95 L) stock kettle and other appliances. Messrooms were equipped with an electric hot plate and an electric toaster.

== Raccoon ==
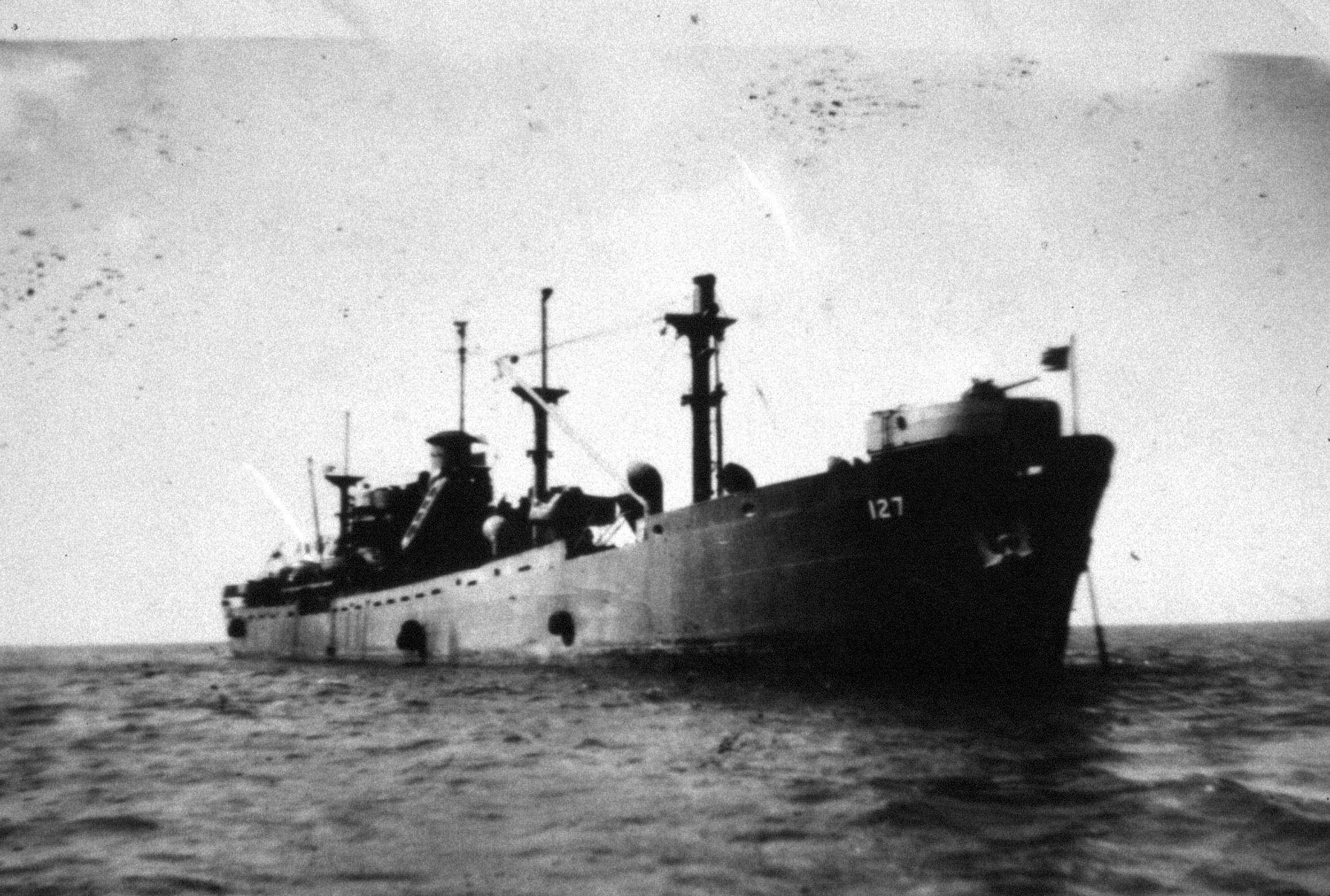
USS Raccoon

Raccoon was a tanker built by Delta Shipbuilding Company, New Orleans, Louisiana. Her keel was laid as J. C. W. Beckham on 7 November 1943. She was launched as Raccoon on 23 December and delivered on 31 January 1944. Built for the United States Navy. Returned to the War Shipping Administration (WSA) in July 1946 and renamed J. C. W. Beckham. Sold in 1948 to Fordom Trading Corp', for International Shipping Corp., Tampa, Florida. Renamed Chrysanthstar later that year and operated under the management of Triton Shipping Inc. Sold in 1949 to Jupiter Steamship Corp. and renamed Jupiter. Converted to a cargo ship at Brooklyn, New York. Now 7,177 GRT. Renamed Searanger in 1951. Sold in 1953 to Nueva Granada Armadora and renamed Sariza. Re-registered to Panama and operated under the management of Goulandris Ltd. Sold in 1963 to Compania Navigation Continental and renamed Sara. Operated under the management of Ocean Shipping & Trading Co. Sold in 1965 to United Mariners Line, Hong Kong and renamed Asia Mariner. Reflagged to Liberia. She was scrapped at Kaohsiung, Taiwan in November 1968.

== Rachel Jackson ==
Rachel Jackson was built by California Shipbuilding Corporation, Terminal Island, Los Angeles, California. Her keel was laid on 2 February 1943. She was launched on 2 March and delivered on 19 March. She was severely damaged in the Atlantic Ocean 300 nautical miles (560 km) north west of Bermuda on 2 March 1952. Four ships went to her aid. Laid up at Beaumont, Texas post-war, she was scuttled off Port Mansfield, Texas on 25 April 1976.

== Rafael R. Rivera ==
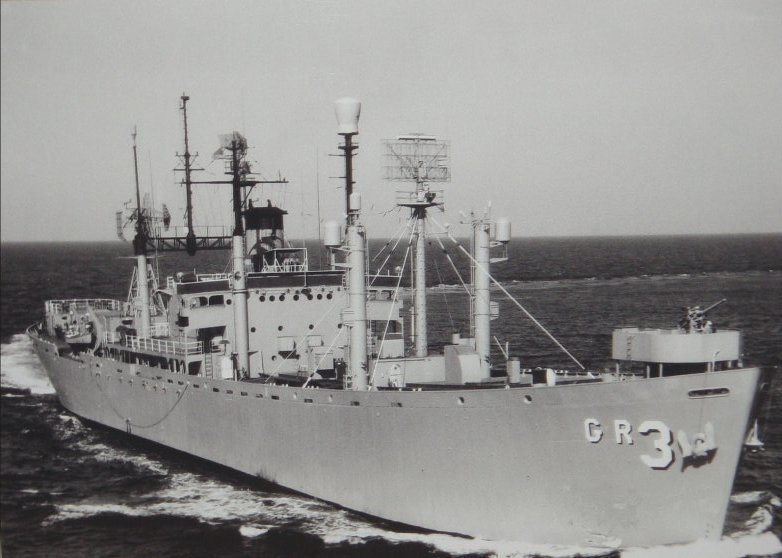
USS Skywatcher

Rafael R. Rivera was a boxed aircraft transport built by J. A. Jones Construction Company, Panama City, Florida. Her keel was laid on 30 November 1944. She was launched on 16 January 1945 and delivered on 30 January. Laid up in reserve post-war. To the United States Navy in September 1954. Converted for naval use at Portsmouth Naval Shipyard, Portsmouth, New Hampshire and renamed Skywatcher. Laid up in the Hudson River in April 1965. Sold to buyers in Karachi, Pakistan in December 1970, she was resold to a German buyer. Resold again, she arrived at Santander, Spain for scrapping in May 1971.

== Ralph A. Cram ==
Ralph A. Cram was built by California Shipbuilding Corporation. Her keel was laid on 18 October 1943. She was launched on 11 November and delivered on 1 December. Built for the WSA, she was operated under the management of Smith & Johnson. Sold in 1947 to Navigazione Generale Gerolimich & Co., Venice, Italy and renamed Atlantico. Sold in 1963 to the Polish Government and renamed Huta Ostrowiec. Operated under the management of Polska Żegluga Morska, Szeczin. Sold to her managers in 1971. She arrived at Santander for scrapping in May 1973.

== Ralph Barnes ==
Ralph Barnes was built by Oregon Shipbuilding Corporation, Portland, Oregon. Her keel was laid on 26 November 1943. She was launched on 10 December and delivered on 27 December. Built for the WSA, she was operated under the management of American Mail Line. Sold in 1946 to Det Ostasiatiske Kompagni, Copenhagen, Denmark and renamed St. Jan. Sold in 1951 to Puerto Nuevo Compania Navigation, Panama and renamed Artemidi. Operated under the management of Milmar Shipping & Trading Corp. Sold in 1952 to Rio Honto Compania Armamente, Panama and renamed Pantokrator. Operated under the management of Transworld Marine Transport Corp. Lengthened at Kobe, Japan in 1955. Now 511 feet 6 inches (155.91 m) long and 8,520 GRT. Reflagged to Liberia and operated under the management of National Shipping & Trading Corp. Sold in 1961 to Hellenic Shipping & Industries Co., Piraeus, Greece and renamed Panagathos. Reflagged to Liberia in 1963. She ran aground off Ameland, Netherlands on 27 October 1965 whilst on a voyage from Hamburg, West Germany to an American port. She was abandoned as a constructive total loss. Her wreck was scrapped in situ in 1970.

== Ralph Izard ==
Ralph Izard was built by Bethlehem Fairfield Shipyard, Baltimore, Maryland. Her keel was laid on 2 August 1942. She was launched on 13 September and delivered on 26 September. She was scrapped at Panama City, Florida in April 1965.

== Ralph T. O'Neill ==
Ralph T. O'Neill was built by Permanente Metals Corporation, Richmond, California. Her keel was laid on 29 April 1944. She was launched on 19 May and delivered on 26 May. She was scrapped at Oakland, California in February 1966.

== Ralph Waldo Emerson ==
Ralph Waldo Emerson was built by Oregon Shipbuilding Corporation. Her keel was laid on 26 February 1942. She was launched on 19 April and delivered on 15 May. She was scrapped at Philadelphia, Pennsylvania in August 1960.

== Ransom A. Moore ==
Ransom A. Moore was built by J. A. Jones Construction Company, Panama City. Her keel was laid on 18 October 1944. She was launched on 21 November and delivered on 30 November. Laid up at Beaumont post-war, she was scrapped at Brownsville, Texas in September 1970.

== Raymond B. Stevens ==
Raymond B. Stevens was built by New England Shipbuilding Corporation, South Portland, Maine. Her keel was laid on 8 March 1944. She was launched on 19 April and delivered on 25 April. Run into by the Liberty ship James Harrod in The Downs on 16 January 1945. She was scrapped at Philadelphia in 1961.

== Raymond Clapper ==
Raymond Clapper was built by St. Johns River Shipbuilding Company, Jacksonville, Florida. Her keel was laid on 17 April 1944. She was launched on 22 May and delivered on 13 June. Built for the WSA, she was operated under the management of T. J. Stevenson & Co., New York. Sold to her managers in 1947 and renamed T. J. Stevenson. Sold in 1954 to Shamrock Steamship Corp., New York and renamed Shamrock. Reflagged to Liberia. Sold later that year to Niki Compania Navigation S.A., Panama and renamed Master Nicky. Remaining under the Liberian flag and operated under the management of Triton Shipping Inc. Renamed Thrylos and reflagged to Greece in 1960. Sold in 1965 to Volbay Navigation S.A., Panama and renamed Elias Dayfas II. Remaining under the Greek flag and operated under the management of Daymark Shipping Agency. She sprang a leak off the coast of Mexico on 5 July 1966 whilst on a voyage from Galveston, Texas to Saigon, South Vietnam. She was taken in tow by the American tanker Sea Pioneer, but the tow broke and she was presumed to have foundered (21°11′N 86°26′W).

== Raymond T. Baker ==
Raymond T. Baker was built by California Shipbuilding Corporation. her keel was laid on 22 December 1943. She was launched on 19 January 1944 and delivered on 7 February. Built for the WSA, she was operated under the management of Coastwise Transportation Co. Sold in 1947 to Georges Nicolaou, Athens, Greece and renamed Nicolaou Zografia. Sold in 1948 to Nicholas G. Nicolaou, Athens. Sold in 1960 to Ionic Steamship Co. and renamed Despo. Operated under the management of George Nicolaou Ltd. She was scrapped at Istanbul, Turkey in May 1971.

== Raymond Van Brogan ==
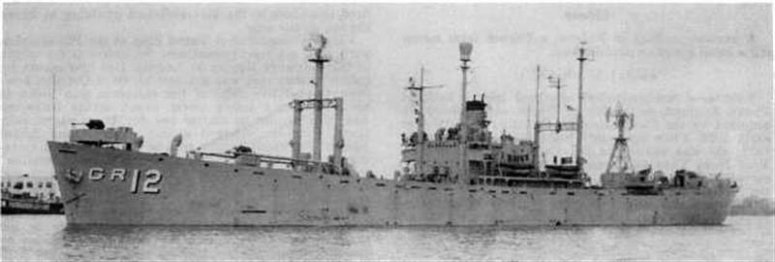
USS Vigil

Raymond Van Brogan was a boxed aircraft transport built by J. A. Jones Construction Company, Panama City. Her keel was laid on 14 December 1944. She was launched on 27 January 1945 and delivered on 10 February. Laid up at Mobile in 1947l. To the United States Navy in June 1956 and renamed Vigil. Converted for naval use at Philadelphia Naval Shipyard. Laid up in the Hudson River in April 1965. Sold to Spanish shipbreakers in November 1970, she arrived at Bilbao for scrapping in January 1971.

== Raymond V. Ingersoll ==
Raymond V. Ingersoll was built by J. A. Jones Construction Company, Panama City. Her keel was laid on 27 July 1944. She was launched on 31 August and delivered on 18 September. Built for the WSA, she was operated under the management of Polarus Steamship Corp. Sold in 1947 to D/S A/S Vestland, Haugesund, Norway and renamed Sneland I. Operated under the management of Sverre Amlie. Management transferred to Richard. Amlie & Co. in 1948. Sold in 1959 to Polska Żegluga Morska and renamed Kopalnia Zabrze. Sold in September 1976 to Zarzad Portu, Gdynia, Poland. Converted to a floating warehouse and renamed MP-ZP GDY 8. She was scrapped at Gdynia in 1982, or the early 1990s.

== R. C. Brennan ==
R. C. Brennan was built by Oregon Shipbuilding Corporation. Her keel was laid on 2 May 1943. She was launched on 21 May and delivered on 29 May. She was scrapped at Portland, Oregon in April 1960.

== Rebecca Boone ==
Rebecca Boone was built by Todd Houston Shipbuilding Corporation, Houston, Texas. Her keel was laid on 14 November 1943. She was launched on 21 December and delivered on 31 December. Built for the WSA, she was operated under the management of North Atlantic & Gulf Steamship Co. Sold in 1947 to Suwanee Fruit & Steamship Co., Jacksonville. Sold in 1949 to Honduras Shipping Co., Tegucigalpa, Honduras. Sold in 1950 to Oceanica Compania de Transportes, Panama and renamed Venerator. Reflagged to Liberia and operated under the management of Lemos & Pateras. Management transferred to Diamantis Pateras in 1953. Sold in 1958 to I.N.S.A. Società di Navigazione, Genoa, Italy and renamed Giga. Sold in 1960 to La Austral S.A., Buenos Aires, Argentina and renamed Cuyano. Rebuilt to a bulk carrier at Trieste, Italy. Lengthened to 511 feet 6 inches (155.91 m) and now 8,184 GRT. Sold in 1961 to Palos Compania de Vapores, Panama and renamed Palos. Remaining under the Liberian flag and operated under the management of Soler y Compania. Sold in 1963 to Fundacion Armadora S.A., Panama and renamed Evmar. Remaining under the Liberian flag and operated under the management of Victoria Steamship Co. Sold in 1971 to Faros Shipping Enterprises, Cape Town, South Africa and renamed Antonia B. She was scrapped at Split, Yugoslavia in December 1972.

== Rebecca Lukens ==
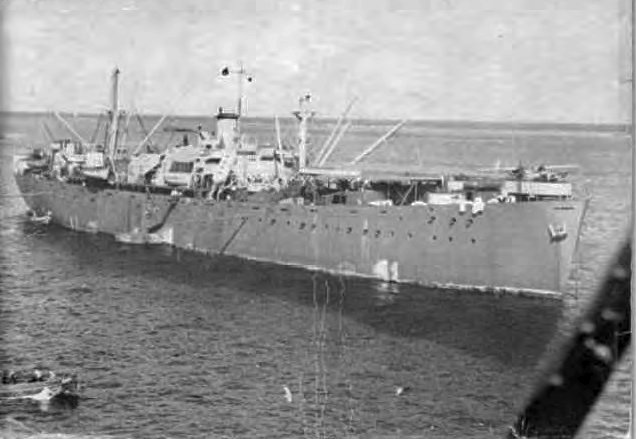
USAT Major General Herbert A. Dargue

Rebecca Lukens was built by J. A. Jones Construction Company, Panama City. Her keel was laid on 7 January 1944. She was launched on 4 March and delivered on 10 April. To the United States Army and renamed Major General Herbert A. Dargue. Returned to United States Maritime Commission (USMC) in 1942 and renamed Rebecca Lukens. Laid up in the James River. She was scrapped at Wilmington, North Carolina in September 1970.

== Redfield Proctor ==
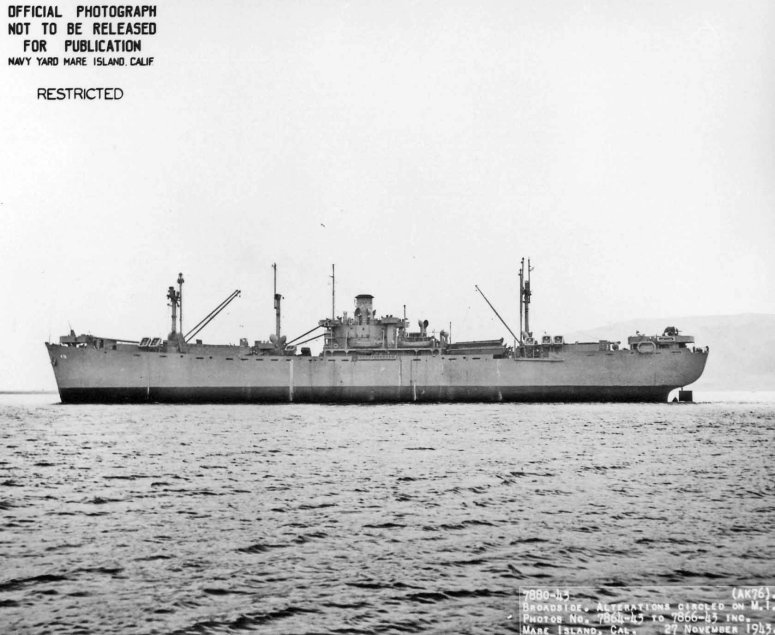
USS Celeno

Redfield Proctor was built by Permanente Metals Corporation. Her keel was laid on 3 November 1942. She was launched on 12 December and delivered on 19 December. To the United States Navy and renamed Celeno. Severely damaged by aircraft off Guadalcanal, Solomon Islands on 16 June 1945 and beached at Lunga Point. Refloated and sailed to San Francisco, California for repairs. Returned to WSA in March 1946 and renamed Redfield Proctor. Laid up in Suisun Bay. She was scrapped at Panama City, Florida in March 1961.

== Redstone Seam ==
Redstone Seam was a collier built by Delta Shipbuilding Company. Her keel was laid on 15 January 1945. She was launched on 20 March and delivered on 16 May. Built for the WSA, she was operated under the management of Wilmore Steamship Co., Boston, Massachusetts. Sold to her managers in 1946 and renamed Berwindvale. Operated under the management of Staples Coal Co. Sold to her managers in 1961. Sold in 1963 to Western Ocean Transport Co. and renamed Point Vincente. Operated under the management of Pacific Coast Transport Co. She was scrapped at Castellón de la Plana, Spain in April 1965.

== Reginald A. Fessenden ==
Reginald A. Fessenden was a tanker built by Delta Shipbuilding Company. Her keel was laid on 8 July 1943. She was launched on 26 August and delivered on 20 October. Built for the WSA, she was operated under the management of International Freighting Corp. Sold in 1948 to First National Oil Corp. and renamed Kingston. Operated under the management of Sieling & Jarvis Corp. Sold in 1950 to Colonial Steamship Corp. and renamed Seamagic. Operated under the management of Orion Shipping & Trading Co. Sold in 1953 to Azteca Compania Armadora and renamed Strapouries. Reflagged to Panama, remaining under the same management. Converted to a cargo ship at Schiedam, Netherlands in 1954. Now 7,185 GRT. Sold in 1955 to Compania Comercial Transatlantica and renamed Theotokos. Remaining under the Panamanian flag and operated under the management of Spiros Polemis. She collided with the British tanker British Statesman 36 nautical miles (67 km) north west of Lisbon, Portugal (39°26′N 9°40′W) on 24 October 1963 whilst on a voyage from IJmuiden, Netherlands to Genoa. She was towed in to Lisbon. Declared a constructive total loss, she was scrapped at Vado Ligure, Italy in March 1964.

== Reinhold Richter ==
Reinhold Richter was built by Permanente Metals Corporation. Her keel was laid on 29 August 1943. She was launched on 23 September and delivered on 2 October. Built for the WSA, she was operated under the management of Seas Shipping Co. To the Dutch Government in 1947 and renamed Simon Stevin. Operated under the management of Van Nievelt, Goudriaan & Co., Rotterdam. Renamed Lissekerk in 1947 and placed under the management of Vereenigde Nederlandsche Scheepvaart Maatschappij, Den Haag. Sold in 1950 To Van Nievelt, Goudriaan & Co. Sold in 1951 to Vereenigde Nederlandsche Scheepvaar Maatschappij. Sold in 1961 to Compania de Navigation Michaels Line, Panama and Athens and renamed Maria de Lourdes. Reflagged to Greece. Sold in 1966 to Marcarinan Compania de Navigation, Panama. Remaining under the Greek flag and operated under the management of Carapanayoti & Co. Management transferred to Shipping & Produce Co. in 1968. She was scrapped at Shanghai, China in February 1970.

== Reliance ==
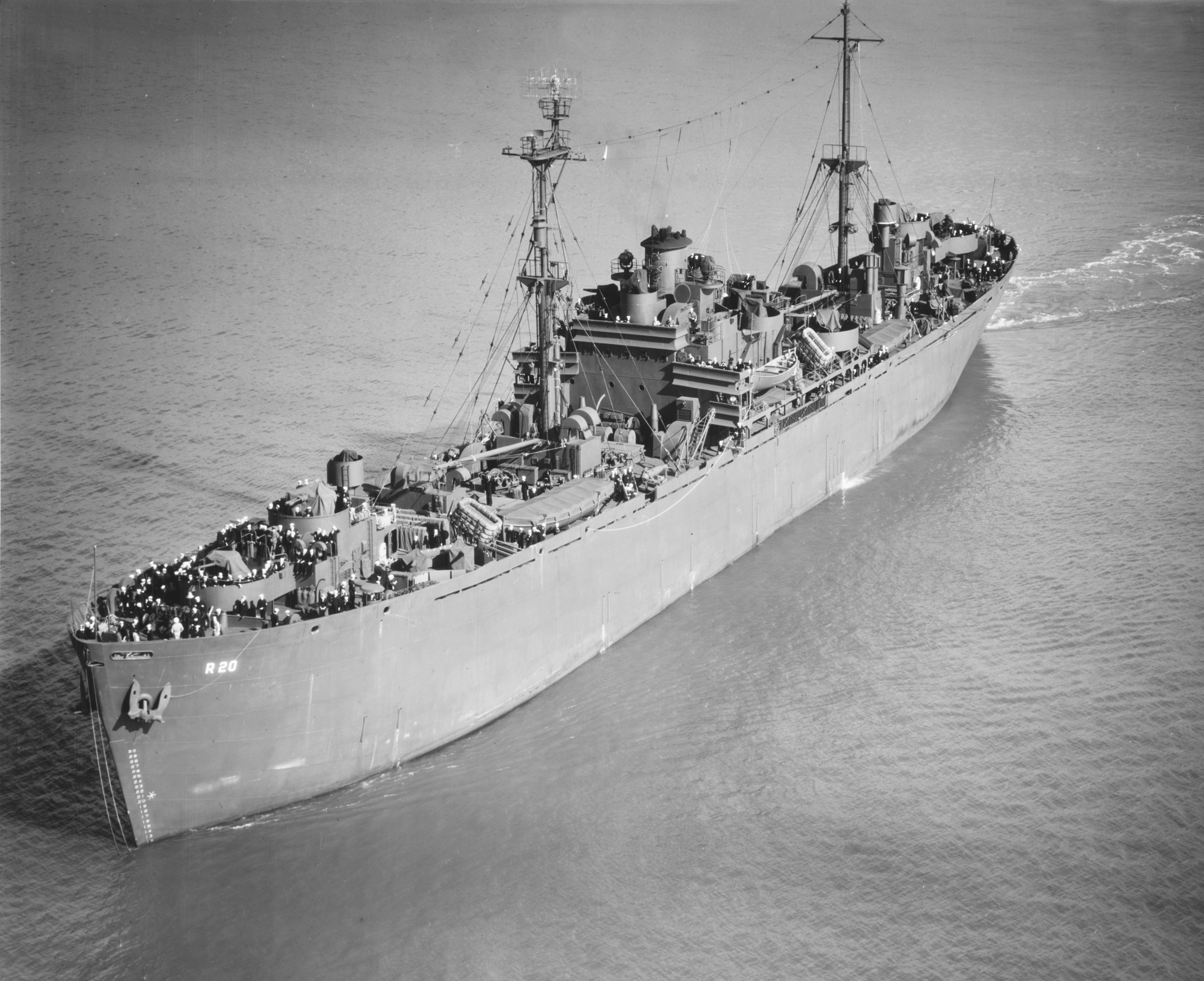
USS Laertes

Reliance was built by California Shipbuilding Corporation. She was completed as Reliance in September 1944. Intended for transfer to the Royal Navy as Dutiful but retained by the United States Navy as Laertes. Laid up at San Diego, California in January 1947. Recommissioned in December 1951. Placed in reserve at San Diego in February 1954. Moved to Suisun Bay in 1961. Scrapped at Tacoma, Washington in or after September 1972.

== Renald Fernald ==
Renald Fernald was built by New England Shipbuilding Corporation. Her keel was laid on 4 December 1943. She was launched on 22 January 1944 and delivered on 4 February. Built for the WSA, she was operated under the management of North Atlantic & Gulf Steamship Co. Management transferred to Sword Line Inc. in 1946. Laid up in the Hudson River in 1948. Sold in 1951 to Amerocean Steamship Co. and renamed Amerocean. Operated under the management of Blackchester Lines Inc. Sold in 1956 to Marine Navigation Co., New York and renamed Marine Progress. Placed under the management of Marine Transport Lines in 1962. She ran aground off Puerto Rico on 26 April 1963 whilst on a voyage from Guánica, Puerto Rico to Philadelphia. She was refloated and towed in to San Juan, Puerto Rico. She was scrapped at Bordentown, New Jersey in September 1963.

== Reverdy Johnson ==
Reverdy Johnson was built by Bethlehem Fairfield Shipyard. Her keel was laid on 15 May 1942. She was launched on 10 July and delivered on 25 July. She was scrapped at Kearny, New Jersey in October 1967.

== R. F. Peckham ==
R. F. Peckham was built by Permanente Metals Corporation. Her keel was laid on 14 October 1943. She was launched on 2 November and delivered on 10 November. Built for the WSA, she was operated under the management of United States Lines. Collided with the Liberty ship Jesse Cottrell 10 nautical miles (19 km) east of Gibraltar (36°03′N 4°55′W) on 31 December 1945 whilst on a voyage from Palermo, Sicily, Italy to the Hampton Roads, Virginia. She was towed in to Gibraltar and declared a constructive total loss. She was towed to Cádiz, Spain for scrapping on 27 September 1948. She was sold and rebuilt, now 7,696 GRT. New owner Fernando M. Pereda, Santander; renamed Rio Tajo Sold in 1961 to Nicomedes Garcia-Gomez and operated under the management of Fletamar. Sold in 1962 to Nicomedes Garcia-Gomez & Fernando M. Pereda, remaining under the same management. Sold in 1967 to Maritima Continental y de Comercio Marcona, Madrid. She arrived at Santander for scrapping in January 1976.

== Richard A. Van Pelt ==
Richard A. Van Pelt was built by J. A. Jones Construction Company, Brunswick, Georgia. Hew keel was laid on 9 January 1945. She was launched as Richard A. Van Pelt on 17 February. Completed as Belgian Equality, she was delivered on 28 February. To the Belgian Government under Lend-Lease. Sold in 1947 to Compagnie Maritime Belge and renamed Capitaine Heusers. Operated under the management of Agence Maritime International. Sold in 1950 to Compagnie Maritime Congolaise. Sold in 1960 to Compagnie Africaine di Navigation, Antwerp. Sold in 1962 to Twenty-sixth October Marine Co. and renamed St. Demetrius. Reflagged to Lebanon and operated under the management of Nomikos Ltd. Sold in 1967 to St. Demetrius Maritime Co., Gibraltar and re-registered to the United Kingdom. Sold in 1969 to Anastasios em Karavias. Reflagged to Greece and operated under the management of Karavias Ltd. Scrapped at Hong Kong in September 1969.

== Richard Bassett ==
Richard Bassett was a limited troop carrier built by Bethlehem Fairfield Shipyard. Her keel was laid on 18 March 1842. She was launched on 22 May and delivered on 13 June. Built for the WSA, she was operated under the management of A. H. Bull & Co., New York. Sold to her managers in 1947 and renamed Carolyn. Sold in 1948 to Baltimore Insular Line and operated under the management of her previous owner. Returned to the United States Government in 1961 and laid up. She was scrapped at Panama City, Florida in October 1962.

== Richard Bland ==
Richard Bland was built by Bethlehem Fairfield Shipyard. Her keel was laid on 29 October 1941. She was launched on 28 February 1942 and delivered on 17 April. Built for the WSA, she was operated under the management of American South African Line. She was torpedoed and damaged in the Arctic Ocean on 5 March 1943 by U-255 whilst on a voyage from Murmansk, Soviet Union to Loch Ewe. She was torpedoed again by U-255 on 10 March 35 nautical miles (65 km) off Langanes, Iceland (65°53′N 14°10′W) and broke in two. The stern section sank. The bow section was beached at Akureyreii.

== Richard B. Moore ==
Richard B. Moore was built by Permanente Metals Corporation. Her keel was laid on 12 November 1943. She was launched on 30 November and delivered on 10 December. Built for the WSA, she was operated under the management of De La Rama Steamship Company, Inc. Sold in 1947 to Carlo Martinolich & Figlio, Trieste and renamed San Giusto. Sold in 1963 to Sovtorgflot, Odesa, Soviet Union and renamed Mashuk. She was scrapped at Bilbao in September 1972.

== Richard Caswell ==
Richard Caswell was built by North Carolina Shipbuilding Company. Her keel was laid on 6 November 1942. She was launched on 10 December and delivered on 22 December. Built for the WSA, she was operated under the management of South Atlantic Steamship Co. She was torpedoed and sunk in the Atlantic Ocean off Paranagua, Brazil (28°10′S 46°30′W) by German submarine U-513 on 16 July 1943 whilst on a voyage from Buenos Aires to New York.

== Richard Coulter ==
Richard Coulter was built by Southeastern Shipbuilding Corporation. Her keel was laid on 14 August 1944. She was launched on 22 September and delivered on 3 October. She was scrapped at Baltimore in July 1960.

== Richard D. Lyons ==
Richard D. Lyons was built by New England Shipbuilding Corporation. Her keel was laid on 18 January 1945. She was launched on 13 March and delivered on 21 March. Built for the WSA, she was operated under the management of United States Lines. Chartered to the Greek Government in 1946. Sold later that year to Galaxias Steamship Co., Piraeus. Sold in 1959 to Apollania Shipping Co. Operated under the management of Lyras Bros. She was scrapped at Hirao, Japan in February 1968.

== Richard D. Spaight ==
Richard D. Spaight was built by North Carolina Shipbuilding Company. Her keel was laid on 8 July 1942. She was launched on 11 September and delivered on 23 September. Built for the WSA, she was operated under the management of American West African Line. She was torpedoed, shelled and sunk 350 nautical miles (650 km) off Durban, Union of South Africa (28°00′S 37°00′E) on 10 March 1943 whilst on a voyage from Suez, Egypt to Durban.

== Richard Halliburton ==
Richard Halliburton was built by J. A. Jones Construction Company, Panama City. Her keel was laid on 31 August 1944. She was launched on 10 October and delivered on 25 October. She was scrapped at Kearny in 1961.

== Richard H. Alvey ==
Richard H. Alvey was built by Bethlehem Fairfield Shipyard. Her keel was laid on 24 May 1942. She was launched on 15 July and delivered on 29 July. She was scrapped at Beaumont in 1961.

== Richard Harding Davis ==
Richard Harding Davis was built by Oregon Shipbuilding Corporation. Her keel was laid on 3 April 1943. She was launched on 23 April and delivered on 30 April. She was scrapped at Oakland in July 1967.

== Richard Henderson ==
Richard Henderson was built by Permanente Metals Corporation. Her keel was laid on 29 December 1942. She was launched on 31 January 1943 and delivered on 15 February. Built for the WSA, she was operated under the management of United States Lines. She was torpedoed and sunk in the Mediterranean Sea off the coast of Sardinia, Italy (approximately 37°15′N 8°24′E) by U-410 on 26 August 1943 whilst on a voyage from Philadelphia to Bandar Shapur, Iran.

== Richard Henry Dana ==
Richard Henry Dana was built by California Shipbuilding Corporation. Her keel was laid on 27 May 1942. She was launched on 12 July and delivered on 31 July. She was converted to a crane barge at Portland, Oregon in 1966 and renamed Puget Logger No. 1. Converted to a floating wharf in 1971 and renamed Floating Dock No. 2.

== Richard Henry Lee ==
Richard Henry Lee was built by Bethlehem Fairfield Shipyard. Her keel was laid on 15 July 1941. She was launched on 6 December and delivered on 20 February 1942. She was scrapped at New Orleans in 1965.

== Richard Hovey ==
Richard Hovey was built by New England Shipbuilding Corporation. Her keel was laid on 27 December 1942. She was launched on 14 March 1943 and delivered on 31 March. Built for the WSA, she was operated under the management of Sprague Steamship Co. She was torpedoed, shelled and sunk in the Indian Ocean (16°40′N 64°30′E) by I-26 on a voyage from Calcutta, India to an American port.

== Richard J. Cleveland ==
Richard J. Cleveland a tankier was built by California Shipbuilding Corporation. She was completed in October 1943. Built for the WSA, she was operated under the management of Spencer Kellogg & Sons. Management transferred to Marine Transport Lines in 1946. Sold in 1948 to Southeastern Tankers Inc., Wilmington, Delaware. Sold later that year to Southeastern Oil Inc., Jacksonville. Sold in 1950 to Petroleos Mexicanos, Mexico City and renamed Mata Redonda. She was scrapped at Tampico, Mexico in 1968.

== Richard J. Hopkins ==
Richard J. Hopkins was built by Todd Houston Shipbuilding Corporation. Her keel was laid on 26 August 1944. She was launched on 2 October and delivered on 12 October. Built for the WSA, she was operated under the management of Moore-McCormack Lines. Management transferred to W. J. Rountree & Co. in 1946. Laid up in the Hudson River in 1949. Sold in 1951 to Metro Steamship Copr., New York and renamed Atlantic Water. Sold in 1956 to Astroluz Compania Navigation, Panama. Operated under the management of Mar-Trade Corp. Management transferred to Cargo & Tankship Management Corp. in 1958. Renamed Koumiotissa in 1961 and reflagged to Greece. Management transferred to Marine Managers Inc. in 1962. Sold in 1963 to Horizon Navigation Co. and renamed Agia Ereni L. She suffered a fractured hull and sank in the Pacific Ocean 600 nautical miles (1,100 km) east of Yokohama, Japan (30°22′N 153°00′E) on 3 February 1964 whilst on a voyage from Portland, Maine to Kawasaki, Japan.

== Richard J. Oglesby ==
Richard J. Oglesby was built by Oregon Shipbuilding Corporation. Her keel was laid on 27 October 1943. She was launched on 15 November and delivered on 24 November. She was scrapped at Alameda, California in 1958.

== Richard Jordan Gatling ==
Richard Jordan Gatling was built by Permanente Metals Corporation. Her keel was laid on 28 August 1942. She was launched on 14 October and delivered on 23 October. She was scrapped at Oakland in April 1969.

== Richard K. Call ==
Richard K. Call was built by St. Johns River Shipbuilding Corporation. Her keel was laid on 21 February 1944. She was launched on 15 April and delivered on 28 April. She was scrapped at Panama City, Florida in June 1970.

== Richard M. Johnson ==
Richard M. Johnson was built by Delta Shipbuilding Company. Her keel was laid on 25 April 1943. She was launched on 5 June and delivered on 23 June. Laid up at Beaumont post-war, she was sold to shipbreakers in Cleveland, Ohio in August 1973.

== Richard Mansfield ==
Richard Mansfield was built by Oregon Shipbuilding Corporation. Her keel was laid on 18 November 1942. She was launched on 13 December and delivered on 21 December. She was scrapped at Seattle, Washington in February 1959.

== Richard March Hoe ==
Richard March Hoe was built by Permanente Metals Corporation. Her keel was laid on 20 September 1942. She was launched on 30 October and delivered on 9 November. Built for the United States Army Transport Service. To the United States Navy in October 1943 and renamed Prince Georges. Returned to WSA in April 1946 and renamed Richard March Hoe. Laid up in Suisun Bay. She was scrapped at Oakland in November 1969.

== Richard Moczkowski ==
Richard Moczkowski was built by Permanente Metals Corporation. Her keel was laid on 31 July 1943. She was launched on 22 August and delivered on 31 August. She was scrapped at Kearny in 1966.

== Richard Montgomery ==
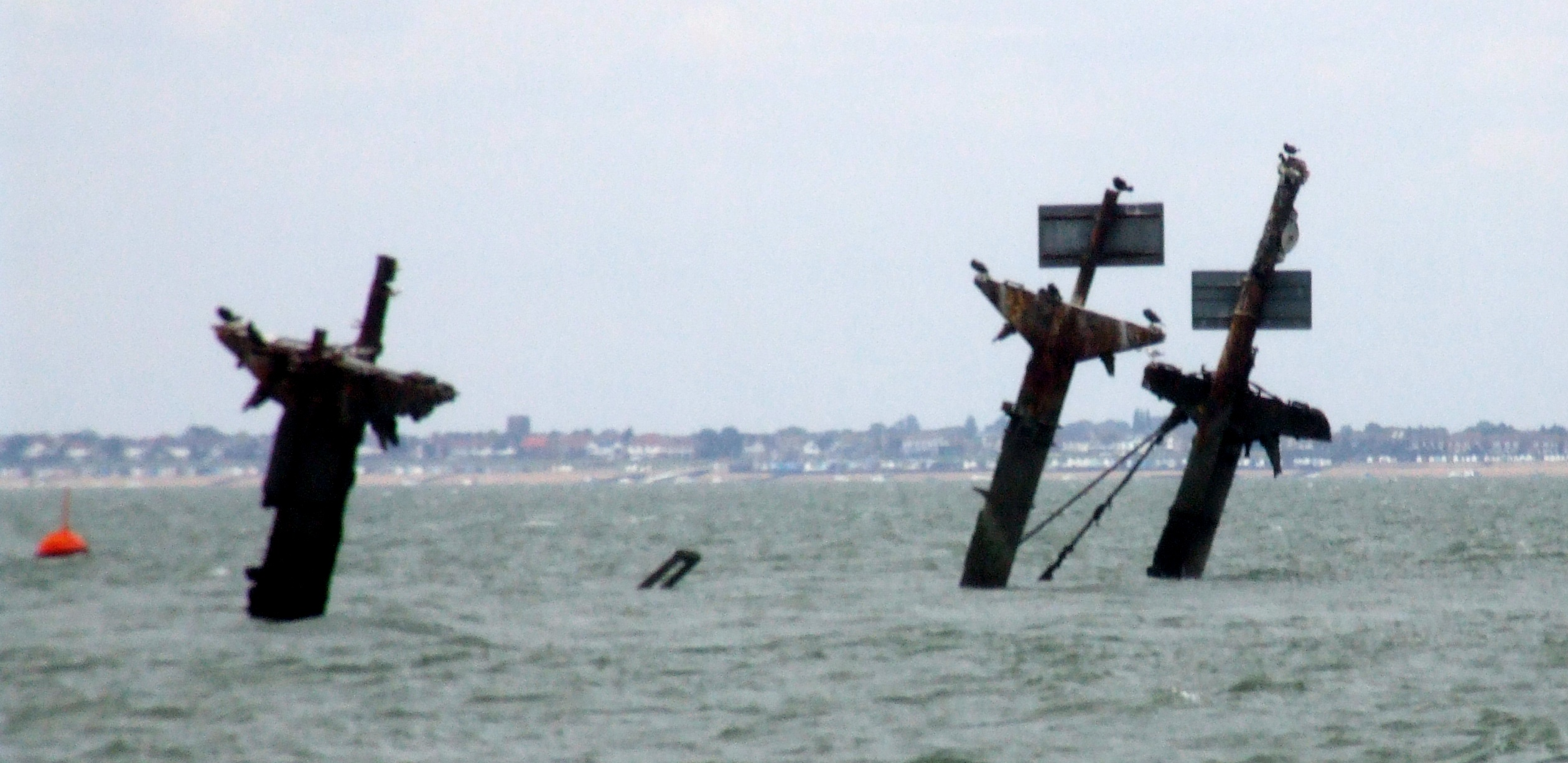
Wreck of the Richard Montgomery.

Richard Montgomery was built by St. Johns River Shipbuilding Corporation. Her keel was laid on 15 March 1943. She was launched on 15 June and delivered on 29 July. Built for the WSA, she was operated under the management of Agwilines Inc. Reported to have been damaged by an aerial attack in the Thames Estuary in August 1944 whilst on a voyage from New York to Sheerness, United Kingdom. She ran aground on the Nore on 20 August and broke her back. Declared a constructive total loss. Part of her cargo of ammunition was salvaged, but salvage was abandoned as too dangerous. She had broken into three by 1972. The wreck remains in situ as of 2026.

== Richard O'Brien ==
Richard O'Brien was built by Todd Houston Shipbuilding Corporation. Her keel was laid on 15 March 1944. She was launched on 25 April and delivered on 5 May. To the United States Army and renamed Brigadier General Asa N. Duncan. Returned to USMC in 1946 and renamed Richard O'Brien. Laid up in the James River. She was scrapped at Burriana, Spain in December 1972.

== Richrd Olney ==
Richard Olney was built by Delta Shipbuilding Company. Her keel was laid on 13 December 1942. She was launched on 22 January 1943 and delivered on 11 February. Built for the WSA, she was operated under the management of Marine Transport Lines. She struck a mine in the Mediterranean Sea 8 nautical miles (15 km) off Bizerta, Tunisia (37°25′N 9°54′E) on 22 September 1943 whilst on a voyage from Oran, Algeria to Bizerta. She was towed in to Bizerta, where she was declared a total loss. She was sold to Italian shipbreakers in 1948.

== Richard Randall ==
Richard Randall was built by J. A. Jones Construction Company, Brunswick. Her keel was laid on 2 October 1944. She was launched on 4 November and delivered on 16 November. Built for the WSA, she was operated under the management of Isbrandtsen Steamship Co. She was scrapped at Mobile in December 1964.

== Richard Rush ==
Richard Rush was built by Oregon Shipbuilding Corporation. Her keel was laid on 17 December 1942. She was launched on 11 January 1943 and delivered on 18 January. She was scrapped at Philadelphia in 1961.

== Richard S. Ewell ==
Ricard S. Ewell was built by Todd Houston Shipbuilding Corporation. Her keel was laid on 11 February 1943. She was launched on 29 March and delivered on 16 April. She was scrapped at Camden, New Jersey in 1965.

== Richard Stockton ==
Belgian Loyalty

Richard Stockton was built by Permanente Metals Corporation. Her keel was laid on 2q June 1942. She was launched as Richard Stockton on 17 August. Completed as Belgian Loyalty, she was delivered on 31 August. To the Belgian Government under Lend-Lease. To USMC in 1947. Renamed Richard Stockton and laid up in the Hudson River. To the United States Department of Commerce (USDoC) in 1951, operated under the management of American Foreign Steamship Corporation. Laid up in the James River in 1952. She was scrapped at Castellón de la Plana in June 1972.

== Richard Upjohn ==
Richard Upjohn was built by Southeastern Shipbuilding Corporation. Her keel was laid on 15 April 1944. She was launched on 8 June and delivered on 28 June. Laid up at Mobile post-war, she was scuttled off Horn Island, Mississippi on 18 September 1976.

== Richard V. Oulahan ==
Richard V. Oulahan was built by J. A. Jones Construction Company, Panama City. Her keel was laid on 26 February 1944. She was launched on 11 April and delivered on 11 May. She was driven ashore and wrecked in a typhoon at Okinawa, Japan on 16 September 1945 whilst on a voyage from Seattle to Okinawa. She was subsequently scrapped by China Merchants & Engineers Inc.

== Richard Yates ==
Richard Yates was built by Permanente Metals Corporation. Her keel was laid on 18 December 1942. She was launched on 22 January 1943 and delivered on 31 January. Laid up in the Hudson River post-war. She was sold to buyers in Karachi in December 1970. Resold, she was scrapped at Valencia, Spain in October 1971.

== Richmond Mumford Pearson ==
Richmond Mumford Pearson was built by Delta Shipbuilding Company. Her keel was laid on 31 August 1942. She was launched on 27 October and delivered on 18 November. She was scrapped at Tacoma in October 1963.

== Richmond P. Hobson ==
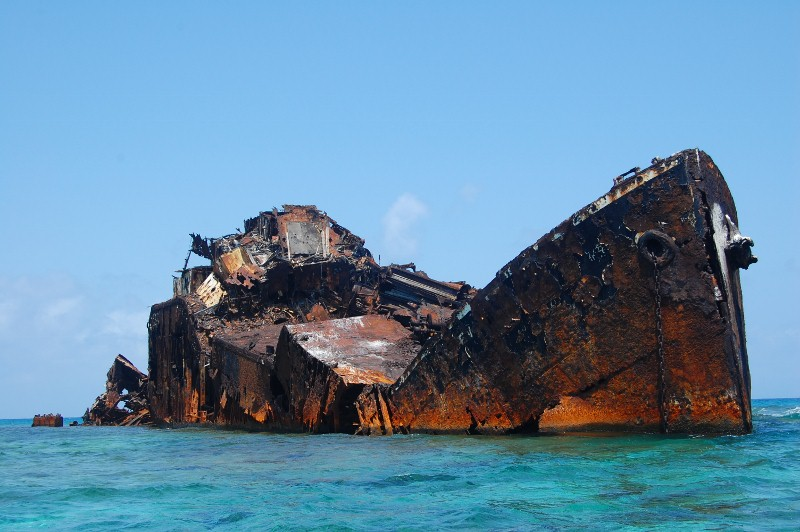
Wreck of the Trebisnjica

Richmond P. Hobson was a limited troop carrier built by North Carolina Shipbuilding Corporation. Her keel was laid on 25 June 1943. She was launched on 17 July and delivered on 25 July. Built for the WSA, she was operated under the management of Isbrandtsen Co. Sold in 1947 to Compania Faralon de Navigation and renamed Nueva Esperanza. Reflagged to Panama and operated under the management of Dow & Symmers. Management transferred to Boyd, Weir & Sewell in 1953, then to Fafalios Ltd. in 1954. Sold in 1961 to Jugoslavenska Slobodna Plovidba, Polce, Yugoslavia and renamed Trebisnjica. She ran aground on the Hogsty Reef (21°36′N 73°50′W) on 17 July 1963 whilst on a voyage from Naples, Italy to a port in Cuba. She was a total loss.

== Ring Lardner ==
Ring Lardner was built by Permanente Metals Corporation. Her keel was laid on 13 July 1943. She was launched on 7 August and delivered on 18 August. She was scrapped at Oakland in 1959.

== Risden Tyler Bennett ==
Risden Tyler Bennett was built by Southeastern Shipbuilding Corporation. Her keel was laid on 12 June 1944. She was launched on 22 July and delivered on 11 August. She was scrapped at Philadelphia in April 1963.

== R. J. Reynolds ==
R. J. Retnolds was built by J. A. Jones Construction Company, Brunswick. Her keel was laid on 19 August 1944. She was launched on 30 September and delivered on 10 October. Built for the WSA, she was operated under the management of Black Diamond Steamship Company. She was scrapped at Baltimore in March 1958.

== R. M. Williamson ==
R. M. Williamson was built by Todd Houston Shipbuilding Corporation. Her keel was laid on 25 June 1943. She was launched on 10 August and delivered on 24 August. Built for the WSA, she was operated under the management of Standard Fruit & Steamship Co. Sold in 1947 to John Kairis & Partners, Athens and renamed Nicolas Kairis. Operated under the management of Rethymnis & Kulukundis. Sold in 1952 to Giannis Kairis & Partners, Athens. Remaining under the same management. Sold in 1954 to J. N. Kairis & Partners, Athens. Remaining under the same management. She ran aground off Kuchinoshima, Japan (30°04′N 129°52′E) on 5 May 1959 whilst on a voyage from Haifa, Israel to Tokyo, Japan. She broke in two and sank.

== R. Ney McNeeley ==
R. Ney McNeeley was built by J. A. Jones Construction Company, Brunswick. Her keel was laid on 9 December 1943. She was launched on 20 January 1944 and delivered on 10 February. Built for the WSA, she was operated under the management of South Atlantic Steamship Co. To the United States Navy in 1955. Later laid up in the James River. She was scrapped at Kearny in August 1973.

== Robert Bacon ==
Robert Bacon was built by Delta Shipbuilding Company. Her keel was laid on 4 January 1943. She was launched on 12 February and delivered on 28 February. Built for the WSA, she was operated under the management of R. A. Nicol & Co. She was torpedoed and sunk in the Indian Ocean off Mozambique (15°02′S 41°13′E) by U-178 on 14 July 1943 whilst on a voyage from Suez to Bahia, Brazil.

== Robert Battey ==
Robert Battey was built by J. A. Jones Construction Company, Brunswick. Her keel was laid on 8 October 1943. She was launched on 30 November and delivered on 10 December. Built for the WSA, she was operated under the management of Cosmopolitan Shipping Co. She ran aground at Bilaa Point, Mindanao, Philippines on 6 September 1945 whilst on a voyage from Batangas, Philippines to San Francisco. She was refloated and found to be severely damaged. Subsequently, laid up in the United States. She was transferred to the United States Navy in 1965 and disposed of.

== Robert B. Forbes ==
Robert B. Forbes was built by New England Shipbuilding Corporation. Her keel was laid on 31 July 1944. She was launched on 18 September and delivered on 25 September. She was scrapped at Portland, Oregon in November 1965.

== Robert C. Grier ==
Robert C. Grier was built by California Shipbuilding Corporation. Her keel was laid on 29 September 1942. She was launched on 31 October and delivered on 19 November. She was scrapped at Tacoma in 1966.

== Robert Dale Owen ==
Robert Dale Owen was a limited troop carrier built by North Carolina Shipbuilding Company. Her keel was laid on 26 April 1943. She was launched on 21 May and delivered on 27 May. Built for the WSA, she was operated under the management of Black Diamond Steamship Company. Sold in 1946 to Panagos D. Pateras, Chios, Greece and renamed Kalliopi. She struck a mine off Rijeka, Yugoslavia (45°08′N 14°16′E), broke in three and sank on 20 December 1947 whilst on a voyage from Charleston, South Carolina to Rijeka.

== Robert D. Carey ==
Robert D. Carey was built by Permanente Metals Corporation. Her keel was laid on 24 February 1944. She was launched on 14 March and delivered on 24 March. Built for the WSA, she was operated under the management of Shepard Steamship Co. Sold in 1947 to Lloyd Triestino S.A. di Navigazione, Trieste and renamed Perla. Sold in 1964 to Fratelli d'Amico, Rome. She was scrapped at La Spezia, Italy in January 1969.

== Robert E. Clarkson ==
Robert E. Clarkson was built by Todd Houston Shipbuilding Corporation. Her keel was laid on 26 July 1944. She was launched on 2 September and delivered on 16 September. She was scrapped at Portland, Oregon in January 1965.

== Robert E. Peary ==
Robert E. Peary was the Liberty ship built in the fastest time; 4 days, 15 hours, 30 minutes from keel laying to launch. She was built by Permanente Metals Corporation. Her keel was laid on 8 November 1942. She was launched on 12 November and delivered on 15 November. She was scrapped at Baltimore in June 1963.

== Robert Eden ==
Robert Eden was built by Bethlehem Fairfield Shipyard. Her keel was laid on 10 June 1943. She was launched on 18 July and delivered on 28 July. She was scrapped at Tacoma in September 1964.

== Robert Ellis Lewis ==
Robert Ellis Lewis was built by Bethlehem Fairfield Shipyard. Her keel was laid on 2 February 1944. She was launched on 7 March and delivered on 17 March. She was scrapped at Santander in April 1970.

== Robert Erskine ==
Robert Erskine was built by Bethlehem Fairfield Shipyard. Her keel was laid on 31 May 1943. She was launched on 29 June and delivered on 12 July. Built for the WSA, she was operated under the management of T. J. Stevenson & Co. She was driven ashore at Bizerta whilst on a voyage from New York to Naoles on 6 January 1944. She broke in two and was declared a total loss. Her wreck was sold to Genoa shipbreakers in 1948.

== Robert F. Broussard ==
Robert F. Broussard was built by Delta Shipbuilding Company. Her keel was laid on 8 July 1944. She was launched on 17 August and delivered on 26 September. She was scrapped at Philadelphia in 1965.

== Robert F. Burns ==
Robert F. Burns was a boxed aircraft transport ship built by J. A. Jones Construction Company, Panama City. Her keel was laid on 30 June 1945. She was launched on 28 August and delivered on 16 September. She was scrapped at New Orleans in December 1968.

== Robert Fechner ==
Robert Fechner was built by Southeastern Shipbuilding Corporation. Her keel was laid on 6 September 1943. She was launched on 28 October and delivered on 8 November. Built for the WSA, she was operated under the management of South Atlantic Steamship Line. To the Dutch Government in 1947 and renamed Van der Waals. Operated under the management of Nederland N.V. Stoomboots Maatschappij, Amsterdam. Sold to her managers in 1950 and renamed Enggano. Sold in 1957 to Amsterdam N.V. Reederij and renamed Amstellaan. Sold in 1961 to Pacific Overseas Navigation Corp. and renamed Silver State. Reflagged to Liberia and operated under the management of Valless Steamship Co. She was scrapped at Kaohsiung in November 1966.

== Robert F. Hoke ==
Ropbert F. Hoke was built by North Carolina Shipbuilding Company. Her keel was laid on 10 April 1943. She was launched on 4 May and delivered on 11 May. Built for the WSA, she was operated under the management of American Export Lines. She was torpedoed and damaged in the Arabian Sea by I-26 on 28 December 1943 whilst on a voyage from Abadan, Iran to Mombasa, Kenya Colony. She was towed to Oman and beached. Refloated on 14 January 1944 and towed to Aden. Towed to Massawa, Colony of Eritrea on 28 January. She broke her back in June. Following temporary repairs, she departed under to for Suez on 27 July. She put in to Port Sudan, Anglo-Egyptian Sudan on 2 August. Departed on 30 September, but subsequently cast adrift in a storm. She was sighted 550 nautical miles (1,020 km) north of Massawa (21°40′N 37°16′E) on 16 October and towed back to Port Sudan. She departed for Suez on 20 November, arriving five days later. Departed under tow for Bombay, India on 25 December. To the Royal Navy in 1945, used as a stevedore training ship. She was beached in Dharamtar Creek in 1947. Sold in June 1949 and scrapped.

== Robert F. Stockton ==
Robert F. Stockton was built by California Shipbuilding Corporation. Her keel was laid on 19 June 1942. She was launched on 29 July and delivered on 18 August. Sold in 1963 to Alabama State Docks Department for scrap, but used as a grain store. Subsequently scrapped.

== Robert Fulton ==
Robert Fulton was built by Oregon Shipbuilding Corporation. Her keel was laid on 20 September 1941. She was launched on 10 January 1942 and delivered on 15 March. She was scrapped at Mobile in December 1969.

== Robert G. Cousins ==
Robert G. Cousins was built by Permanente Metals Corporation. Her keel was laid on 5 December 1943. She was launched on 23 December and delivered on 31 December. Built for the WSA, she was operated under the management of Hammond Shipping Co. Sold in 1947 to Navigazione Alta Italia, Genoa and renamed Monginevro. Sold in 1963 to Sovtorgflot and renamed Avacha. She arrived at Castellón de la Plana for scrapping in February 1973.

== Robert G. Harper ==
Robert G. Harper was built by Oregon Shipbuilding Corporation. Her keel was laid on 22 January 1942. She was launched on 22 March and delivered on 27 April. Built for the WSA, she was operated under the management of Pacific-Atlantic Steamship Co. Laid up in 1946. Sold in 1947 to Det Ostasiatiske Kompani, Copenhagen and renamed St. Croix. Sold in 1951 to Puerto Cabello Compania Navigation, Panama and renamed Marna. Operated under the management of Milmar Shipping & Trading Co. Sold in 1962 to Uranos Compania Navigation, Panama and renamed Uranos. Reflagged to Greece and operated under the management of Nereus Shipping. Sold in 1966 to Great Fortune Navigation Co. Panama & Hong Kong and renamed Great Peace. Reflagged to Liberia. Reflagged to Taiwan in 1968. She was scrapped at Keelung, Taiwan in March 1970.

== Robert G. Ingersoll ==
Robert G. Ingersoll was built by California Shipbuilding Corporation. Her keel was laid on 24 June 1943. She was launched on 18 July and delivered on 31 July. She was scrapped at Terminal Island in February 1961.

== Robert Gray ==
Robert Gray was built by Oregon Shipbuilding Corporation. Her keel was laid on 31 May 1941. She was launched on 15 November and delivered on 11 February 1942. Built for the WSA, she was operated under the management of Waterman Steamship Co. She was torpedoed and sunk in the Atlantic Ocean (approximately 57°30′N 43°00′W) by U-306 on 22 April 1943 whilst on a voyage from New York to London as a member of Convoy HX 234.

== Robert H. Harrison ==
Robert H. Harrison was built by Permanente Metals Corporation. Her keel was laid on 7 September 1942. She was launched on 17 October and delivered on 4 November. She was scrapped at Bordentown in 1966.

== Robert Henri ==
Robert Henri was built by Todd Houston Shipbuilding Corporation. Her keel was laid on 6 January 1944. She was launched on 22 February and delivered on 6 June. She was scrapped at Baltimore in 1958.

== Robert Howe ==
Robert Howe was built by North Carolina Shipbuilding Company. Her keel was laid on 10 December 1942. She was launched on 13 January 1943 and delivered on 23 January. Laid up in the Hudson River post-war, she was scrapped at Bilbao in February 1971.

== Robert J. Banks ==
Robert J. Banks was built by J. A. Jones Construction Company, Brunswick. Her keel was laid on 21 November 1944. She was launched on as Robert J. Banks 20 December and delivered as Vadso on 30 December. To Norway under Lend-Lease. Operated under the management of Nortraship. Sold in 1946 to Skips A/S Mandeville, Oslo and renamed Libreville. Operated under the management of A. F. Klaveness & Co. A/S. Sold in 1952 to Rio Valioso Compania Navigation, Panama and renamed Afros. Operated under the management of John & George Dambassis - Seacrest Shipping Co. Sold in 1962 to Marlea Compania Navigation, Beirut, Lebanon and renamed Theodores Lemos. Operated under the management of M. C. Fred Hunter. She arrived at Shanghai for scrapping on 7 June 1967, and was scrapped that month.

== Robert J. Collier ==
Robert J. Collier was built by Bethlehem Fairfield Shipyard. Her keel was laid on 19 May 1943. She was launched on 13 June and delivered on 28 June. She ran aground in the Scheldt on 22 March 1946 whilst on a voyage from Baltimore to Antwerp. She broke in two. Refloated on 8 April and towed in to Antwerp. Declared a constructive total loss, she was scrapped at Antwerp in January 1947.

== Robert J. Walker ==
Robert J. Walker was built by Oregon Shipbuilding Corporation. Her keel was laid on 5 January 1943. She was launched on 2 February and delivered on 12 February. Built for the WSA, she was operated under the management of McCormick Steamship Co. She was torpedoed and damaged 160 nautical miles (300 km) south east of Sydney, Australia by U-582 on 24 December 1944 whilst on a voyage from Calcutta to Sydney. She was scuttled by Quickmatch.

== Robert Jordan ==
Robert Jordan was built by New England Shipbuilding Corporation. Her keel was laid on 25 May 1943. She was launched on 18 July and delivered on 31 July. Built for the WSA, she was operated under the management of American Export Lines. To the French Government in 1946 and renamed Plouharnel. Operated under the management of Compagnie Générale Transatlantique. Management transferred to Compagnie Française de Navigation à Vapeur Chargeurs Réunis in 1949, then to Nouvelle Compagnie Havraise Peninsulaire de Navigation in 1955. She caught fire off the Newport Rock on 14 June 1959 whilst on a voyage from Le Havre, France to Djibouti, Djibouti. She put in to Suez, but subsequently resumed her voyage. The fire was extinguished on 26 June. She was laid up at Nantes, having been declared a constructive total loss. Management transferred to Compagnie Générale Transatlantique in 1960. She was scrapped at Avilés, Spain in November 1963.

== Robert Lansing ==
Robert Lansing was built by J. A. Jones Construction Company, Panama City. Her keel was laid on 3 June 1943. She was launched on 17 July and delivered on 6 August. She was scrapped at Green Cove Springs, Florida in February 1968.

== Robert L. Hague ==
Robert L. Hague was built by California Shipbuilding Corporation. Her keel was laid on 27 January 1944. She was launched on 19 February and delivered on 9 March. Built for the WSA, she was operated under the management of Alaska Steamship Co. Sold in 1947 to Theofano Maritime Co. and renamed Pinios. Reflagged to Greece and operated under the management of Livanos. Sold in 1949 to Athina Maritime Co., Piraeus. Operated under the management of Livanos & Co. Management transferred to Maritime Brokers Inc. in 1952. Sold in 1964 to Acme Financing Co. and renamed Atlantic Master. Operated under the management of S. Livanos. Sold in 1964 to Mic Carriers Corp. and renamed Forward. Reflagged to Liberia and operated under the management of Marine Industry Corp. Sold in 1966 to Oriental Union Maritime Corp. Operated under the management of Union Marine Industries. Sold in 1967 to Venus Maritime Corp. Operated under the management of Motorships Corp. She was scrapped at Kaohsiung in 1968.

== Robert Louis Stevenson ==
Robert Louis Stevenson was built by Permanente Metals Corporation. Her keel was laid on 21 October 1943. She was launched on 9 November and delivered on 16 November. She sank 20 nautical miles (37 km) off Rat Island, Alaska in August 1967 after an attempt to scuttle her 34 nautical miles (63 km) off Amchitka, Alaska in July had failed.

== Robert Lowry ==
Robert Lowry was built by Delta Shipbuilding Company. Her keel was laid on 7 April 1943. She was launched on 10 May and delivered on 25 May. She was scrapped at Portland, Oregon in November 1969.

== Robert Lucas ==
Robert Lucas was built by Permanente Metals Corporation. Her keel was laid on 16 May 1943. She was launched on 10 June and delivered on 29 June. Laid up in the James River post-war, she was scrapped at Gandia, Spain in August 1972.

== Robert L. Vann ==
Robert L. Vann was built by New England Shipbuilding Corporation. Her keel was laid on 14 August 1943. She was launched on 10 October and delivered on 26 October. Built for the WSA, she was operated under the management of United Fruit Company. She struck a mine and sank off Ostend, Belgium (51°23′N 2°51′E) on 1 March 1945 whilst on a voyage from Antwerp to the River Thames, United Kingdom.

== Robert M. La Folette ==
Robert M. La Folette was built by Delta Shipbuilding Company. Her keel was laid on 27 November 1942. She was launched on 10 January 1943 and delivered on 29 January. Built for the WSA, she was operated under the management of Mississippi Shipping Co. To the French Government in 1947 and renamed Troarn. Operated under the management of Compagnie Générale Tranatlantique. Converted to a storeship at Le Havre in 1964. Operated under the management of Ministère de la Marine Marchande. Sold in 1966 to Compania de Navigation Propontis, Panama. Resumed trading under the management of Olympus Agency. She was damaged at Chittagong, East Pakistan in December 1971 during the Bangladesh Liberation War. She subsequently proceeded to Singapore. She was scrapped at Kaohsiung in April 1972.

== Robert Mills ==
Robert Mills was built by St. Johns River Shipbuilding Company. Her keel was laid on 30 August 1944. She was launched on 5 October and delivered on 14 October. Laid up at Mobile post-war, She was scuttled off the coast of Alabama on 24 October 1975.

== Robert Morris ==
Robert Morris was built by California Shipbuilding Corporation. Her keel was laid on 23 July 1941. She was launched on 28 January 1942 and delivered on 24 April. Laid up in the James River post-war, she was scrapped at Bilbao in 1972.

== Robert M. T. Hunter ==
Robert M. T. Hunter was built by Southeastern Shipbuilding Corporation. Her keel was laid on 11 December 1942. She was launched on 28 March 1943 and delivered on 11 May. Laid up in the Hudson River post-war. She was sold to a buyer in Karachi in December 1970. Resold, she was scrapped at Santander in May 1971.

== Robert Neighbors ==
Robert Neighbors was built by Todd Houston Shipbuilding Corporation. Her keel was laid on 15 September 1944. She was launched on 20 October and delivered on 31 October. She was scrapped at Bilbao in July 1970.

== Robert Newell ==
Robert Newell was built by Oregon Shipbuilding Corporation. Her keel was laid on 13 April 1943. She was launched on 2 May and delivered on 10 May. She was scrapped at Seattle in 1961.

== Robert Parrot ==
Robert Parrot was built by Southeastern Shipbuilding Corporation. Her keel was laid on 6 October 1944. She was launched on 16 November and delivered on 30 November. She was scrapped at Portland, Oregon in April 1968.

== Robert R. Livingston ==
Robert R. Livingston was built by J. A. Jones Construction Company, Brunswick. Her keel was laid on 3 January 1944. She was launched on 21 February and delivered on 29 February. Built for the WSA, she was operated under the management of A. H. Bull & Co. She was scrapped at Tacoma in April 1962.

== Robert R. McBurney ==
Robert R. McBurney was built by New England Shipbuilding Corporation. Her keel was laid on 9 August 1944. She was launched on 22 September and delivered on 30 September. She was scrapped at Panama City, Florida in November 1962.

== Robert R. Randall ==
Robert R. Randall was built by New England Shipbuilding Corporation. Her keel was laid on 11 October 1943. She was launched on 24 November and delivered on 6 December. Built for the WSA, she was operated under the management of Eastern Gas & Fuel Association. To the French Government under Lend-Lease in 1944. Sold to them in 1946, operated under the management of Sociètè Navigation Caennaise. Renamed Ouistreham in 1947. Management transferred to Compagnie des Messageries Maritimes in 1953, then to Louis Drefus et Compagnie in 1956 and Sociètè Maritime Nationale in 1961. Sold to Chinese shipbreakers in 1968. Renamed Jupiter and reflagged to Cyprus. Sold in 1969 to Avian Shipping Ltd. and renamed Avian. Operated under the management of Angelos Ltd. She was scrapped at Shanghai in May 1969.

== Robert Rogers ==
Robert Rogers was built by New England Shipbuilding Corporation. Her keel was laid on 25 May 1943. She was launched on 18 July and delivered on 31 July. Laid up in the James River post-war, She was scrapped at Burriana, Spain in May 1972.

== Robert Rowan ==
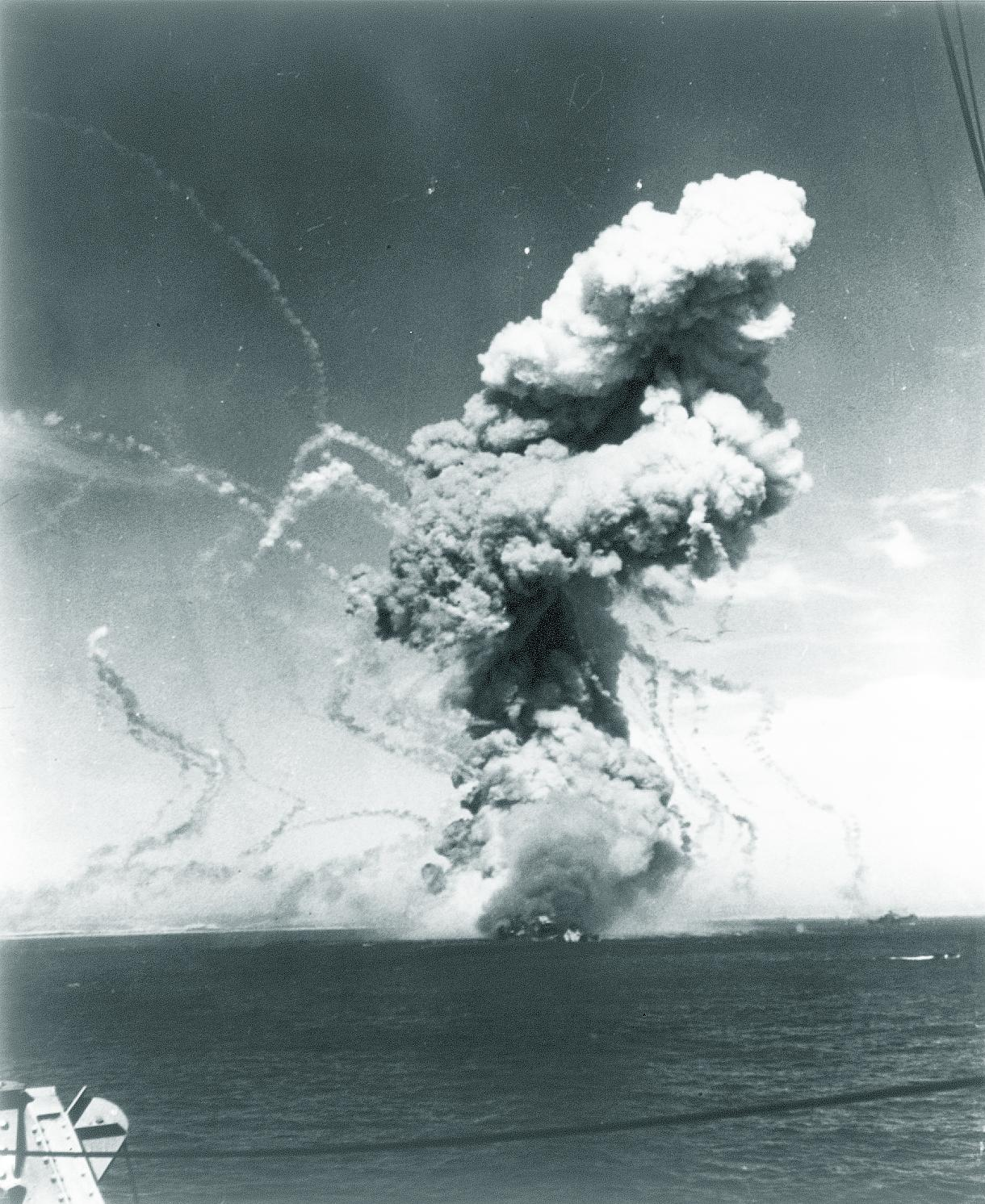
The explosion of Robert Rowan, 11 July 1943.

Robert Rowan was built by North Carolina Shipbuilding Company. Her keel was laid on 5 March 1943. She was launched on 6 April and delivered on 13 April. Built for the WSA, she was operated under the management of Isthmian Steamship Company. She was bombed, shelled and damaged off Gela, Sicily (36°47′N 14°30′E) on 11 July 1943. She caught fire, exploded and sank. Her wreck was sold in February 1948 and scrapped.

== Robert S. Abbott ==
Robert S. Abbott was built by Permanente Metals Corporation, Richmond, California. Her keel was laid on 23 March 1944. She was launched as Robert S. Abbott on 13 April and delivered as Kamenets Podolsk on 18 April. To the Soviet Union. Listed as non-seagoing in 1977 and deleted from shipping registers in 1985.

== Robert S. Bean ==
Robert S. Bean was built by Oregon Shipbuilding Corporation. Her keel was laid on 17 August 1943. She was launched on 4 September and delivered on 11 September. Built for the WSA, she was operated under the management of United States Lines. Sold in 1947 to Ariga Compania de Vapores, Panama and renamed Cleo. Reflagged to Honduras. Placed under the management of North American Shipping & Trading Co. in 1948. Sold in 1951 to Marpuente Compania Maritima, Panama and renamed Arsena. Reflagged to Panama. Placed under the management of Milmar Shipping & Trading Corp. in 1954. She ran aground at Maio, Cape Verde Islands (15°18′N 23°10′W) on 25 July 1958 whilst on a voyage from Takoradi, Ghana to an American port. She was refloated on 5 August and towed to Dakar, Senegal. She departed under tow for Rotterdam, Netherlands on 18 September. Declared a constructive total loss, she was scrapped at Rotterdam in July 1959.

== Robert S. Lovett ==
Robert S. Lovett was built by Todd Houston Shipbuilding Corporation. Her keel was laid on 28 June 1944. She was launched on 5 August and delivered on 17 August. Built for the WSA, she was operated under the management of American Liberty Steamship Co. Management transferred to Lykes Brothers Steamship Company. in 1946. Laid up at Beaumont in 1949. Sold in 1951 to Western Navigation Corp., New York and renamed Western Rancher. Sold in 1954 to Maracay Compania Navigation, Panama and renamed Chryssi S. M.. Reflagged to Liberia and operated under the management of World Seas Shipping Inc. Sold in 1964 to Sotovento Compania Navigation, Panama. Remaining under the same flag and management. She was scrapped at Hamburg in September 1965.

== Robert Stuart ==
Robert Stuart was built by California Shipbuilding Corporation. Her keel was laid on 3 January 1943. She was launched on 31 January and delivered on 17 February. She was scrapped at Philadelphia in 1961.

== Robert T. Hill ==
Robert T. Hill was built by Todd Houston Shipbuilding Corporation. Her keel was laid on 9 June 1943. She was launched on 17 July and delivered on 7 August. She was scrapped at Wilmington, North Carolina in May 1963.

== Robert T. Lincoln ==
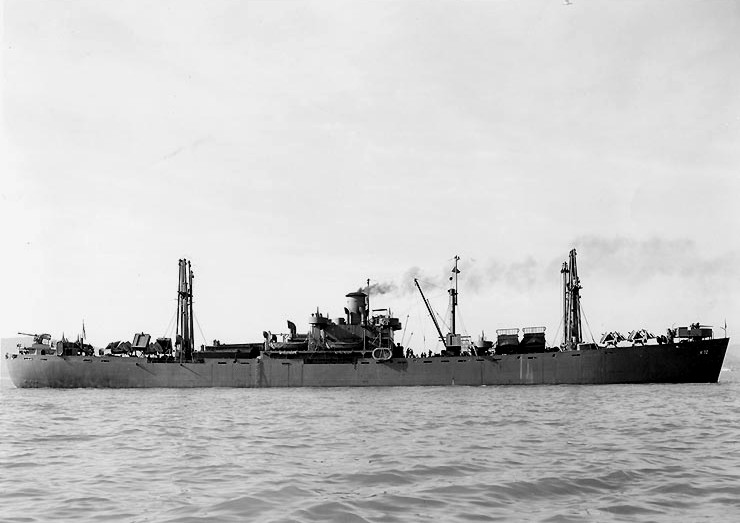
USS Aludra

Robert T. Lincoln was built by Permanente Metals Corporation. Her keel was laid on 28 October 1942. She was launched as Robert T. Lincoln on 7 December and delivered to the United States Navy as Aludra on 14 December. She was torpedoed and sunk by RO-103 off Guadalcanal (11°26′S 162°00′E) on 23 June 1943 whilst on a voyage from Guadalcanal to Espiritu Santo, New Hebrides.

== Robert Toombs ==
Robert Toombs was built by Southeastern Shipbuilding Corporation. Her keel was laid on 24 November 1942. She was launched on 19 March 1943 and delivered on 30 April. She was scrapped in Baltimore in 1959.

== Robert Treat ==
Robert Treat was built by New England Shipbuilding Corporation. Her keel was laid on 15 April 1943. She was launched on 7 June and delivered on 21 June. She was scrapped at New Orleans in 1967.

== Robert Treat Paine ==
Robert Treat Paine was a troopship built by Bethlehem Fairfield Shipyard. Her keel was laid on 6 January 1942. She was launched on 28 March and delivered on 5 May. Built for the WSA, she was operated under the management of Agwilines Inc. To the French Government in 1947 and renamed Dieppe. Operated under the management of Compagnie Générale Transatlantique. Sold in 1954 to Garraway S.A., Panama and renamed Brother George. Reflagged to Liberia and operated under the management of Wigham, Richardson & Co. She ran aground in the Dry Tortugas (24°43′N 83°00′W) on 6 January 1964 whilst on a voyage from Boca Grande, Florida to a British port. She was refloated on 10 January but then ran aground off Key West, Florida. Refloated on 12 January and put into Port Everglades, Florida. She subsequently resumed her voyage. She ran aground off Brook, Isle of Wight, United Kingdom on 23 February 1964 whilst on a voyage from Ellesmere Port, United Kingdom to Rotterdam. The Dutch tug Witte Zee struck a rock and sank whilst assisting her. She was refloated on 24 February and towed to Rotterdam in a severely damaged condition. She was scrapped at Hendrik-Ido-Ambacht, Netherlands in July 1964.

== Robert Trimble ==
Robert Trimble was built by J. A. Jones Construction Company, Brunswick. Her keel was laid on 29 August 1942. She was launched on 21 June 1943 and delivered on 23 July. Built for the WSA, she was operated under the management of Agwilines Inc. Sold in 1946 to Corrada S.A. di Navigazione, Genoa. Renamed Andrea in 1947. Laid up at La Spezia in 1962, She was scrapped there in June 1963.

== Robert Watchorn ==
Robert Watchorn was built by Todd Houston Shipbuilding Corporation. Her keel was laid on 23 May 1944. She was launched on 27 June and delivered on 8 July. Built for the WSA, she was operated under the management of Black Diamond Steamship Company. Management transferred to American Foreign Steamship Corp., New York in 1946. Sold to her managers in 1947 and renamed American Robin. Sold in 1957 to Continental Carriers Corp. and renamed Pacific Star. Reflagged to Liberia and operated under the management of Nomikos Ltd. Sold in 1958 to Compass Steamship Corp. Reflagged to the United States. Sold in 1960 to Rover Shipping Corp., New York and renamed Rover. Sold later that year to Compania Navigation Peace Lda. and renamed Hwa An. Operated under the management of Hai An Shipping Corp. She was scrapped at Kaohsiung in March 1968.

== Robert W. Bingham ==
Robert W. Bingham was built by Delta Shipbuilding Company. Her keel was laid on 6 April 1944. She was launched as Robert W. Bingham on 16 May 1944 and delivered as Brigadier General Clinton W. Russell on 20 July. An aircraft repair ship for the United States Army, she was returned to the WSA in 1947 and renamed Robert W. Bingham. She was scrapped at New Orleans in 1959.

== Robert W. Hart ==
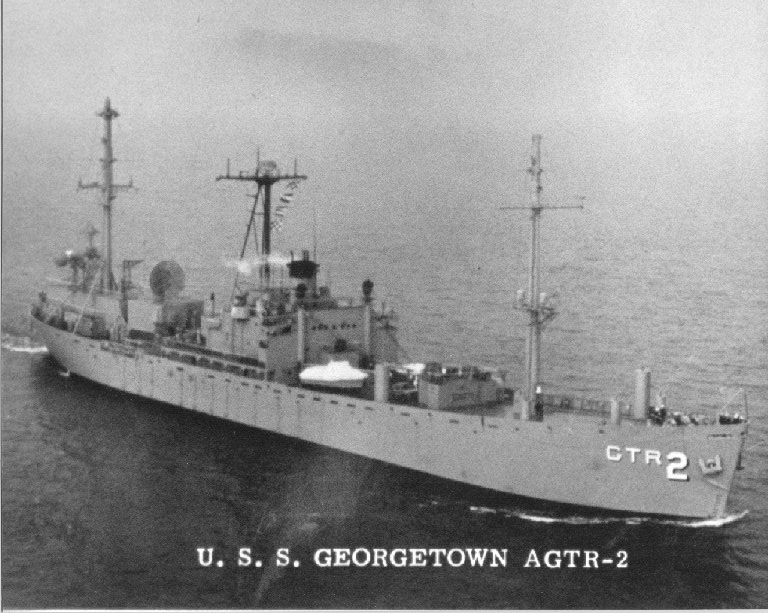
USS Georgetown

Robert W. Hart was built a boxed aircraft transport built by New England Shipbuilding Corporation. Her keel was laid on 4 May 1945. She was launched on 10 July and delivered on 2 August. She was laid up at Wilmington, North Carolina in December 1946. Returned to service in January 1947, she was laid up in the James River in October 1947. To the United States Navy in August 1962 and renamed Georgetown. Converted for naval use by Newport News Shipbuilding & Drydock Company, Newport News, Virginia. Stricken from the navy list in December 1969. Sold to Dutch buyers in August 1970, she was resold to Spanish shipbreakers in February 1971.

== Robert Wickliffe ==
Robert Wickliffe was built by Bethlehem Fairfield Shipyard. Her keel was laid on 18 November 1943. She was launched as Robert Wickliffe on 9 December and delivered as Sambalt on 18 December. To MoWT under Lend-Lease. Operated under the management of Cayzer, Irvine & Co. Management transferred to David Alexander & Sons in 1946. Sold in 1947 to Moller Line Ltd., London and renamed Lilian Moller. Sold in 1948 to Charente Steamship Co., London and renamed Speaker. Operated under the management of T. & J. Harrison. Sold in 1962 to Epos Marine Enterprises, Panama and renamed Byzantion. Reflagged to Greece and operated under the management of A. Luisi Ltd. Management transferred to J. C. Carras & Sons in 1965. She was scrapped at Onomichi, Japan in May 1969.

== Robert Y. Hayne ==
Robert Y. Hayne was built by St. Johns River Shipbuilding Company. Her keel was laid on 2 November 1942. She was launched on 29 May 1943 and delivered on 20 July. Built for the WSA, she was operated under the management of Agwilines Inc. Sold in 1947 to Società Saicen, Savona, Italy and renamed Citta di Savona. Sold in 1948 to S.A. Importazione Carbonie e Navigazione, Savona. Sold in 1958 to Lloyd Africa Ltd and renamed Centreport. Reflagged to Liberia and operated under the management of T. J. Verrando & Co. Management transferred to Transamerican Steamship Corp. in 1964. She was scrapped at Bilbao in May 1971.

== Roda Seam ==
Roda Seam was a collier built by Delta Shipbuilding Company. Her keel was laid on 18 June 1945. She was launched on 25 August and delivered on 13 October. Built for the WSA, she was operated under the management of T. J. Stevenson & Co. Sold in 1947 to Mount Steamship Corp. and renamed Mount Tamalpis. Sold in 1947 to Mystic Steamship Division and renamed Everett. Operated under the management of Eastern Gas & Fuel Associates. Sold in 1954 to Atlantic Bulk Trading Corp. and renamed Gull. Reflagged to Liberia and operated under the management of her previous owner. Sold in 1960 to Maretina Shipping Co. Operated under the management of Ernesto Audoly Società. Management transferred to Interprogress Import & Export in 1962. Sold in 1964 to Imextracon Establissement, Liechtenstein and renamed Algol. Reflagged to Bulgaria. Sold in 1967 to Navigation Maritime Bulgare, Varna, Bulgaria. Renamed Sakar in 1970. She was scrapped at Split in May 1972.

== Rodina ==
Rodina was built by Permanente Metals Corporation. Her keel as laid on 13 April 1944. She was launched as Henry J. Waters on 30 April and delivered as Rodina on 8 May. To the Soviet Union. She was scrapped in the Soviet Union in 1973.

== Roger B. Taney ==
Roger B. Taney was built by Bethlehem Fairfield Shipyard. Her keel was laid on 21 June 1941. She was launched on 6 December and delivered on 9 February 1942. Built for the WSA, she was operated under the management of Waterman Steamship Co. She was torpedoed and sunk in the Atlantic Ocean (22°00′S 7°45′W) by U-160 on 9 February 1943 whilst on a voyage from Suez to Bahia.

== Roger Griswold ==
Roger Griswold was built by Delta Shipbuilding Company. Her keel was laid on 20 January 1943. She was launched on 1 March and delivered on 17 March. Laid up in the James River post-war, she was scrapped at Panama City in December 1972.

== Roger Moore ==
Roger Moore was built by North Carolina Shipbuilding Company. Her keel was laid on 28 February 1943. She was launched on 31 March and delivered on 8 April. Laid up in the Hudson River post-war, she was scrapped at Kearny in May 1971.

== Roger Sherman ==
Roger Sherman was built by Permanente Metals Corporation. Her keel was laid on 15 June 1942. She was launched on 3 August and delivered on 24 August. She was scrapped at Baltimore in September 1961.

== Roger Williams ==
Roger Williams was built by North Carolina Shipbuilding Company. Her keel was laid on 29 June 1942. She was launched on 30 August and delivered on 12 September. Built for the WSA, she was operated under the management of International Freighting Corp. Sold in 1947 to Rederi A/B Dalen and renamed Sonata. Reflagged to Sweden and operated under the management of O. Kihlstrom. Sold in 1952 to Rio Palmea Compania Navigation and renamed Avra. Reflagged to Panama and operated under the management of Seacrest Shipping Co. Sold in 1961 to Orient Marine S.A. and renamed Thrasyvoulos. Operated under the management of Orient Mid-East Ltd. Reported to be leaking 750 nautical miles (1,390 km) south east of Aden on 29 June 1965 whilst on a voyage from Madras to Constanța, Bulgaria. No further trace, presumed foundered.

== Ross G. Marvin ==
Ross G. Marvin was built by Bethlehem Fairfield Shipyard. Her keel was laid on 6 November 1943. She was launched at Ross G. Marvin on 29 November and delivered as Samtroy on 7 December. To MoWT under Lend-Lease. Operated under the management of Andrew Weir & Co. Sold in 1946 to Bank Line and renamed Edenbank, remaining under the same management. To China in 1960 and renamed Hoping Ssu Shi San. Renamed Dan Zhou 43 in 1967. Sold in 1973 to China Ocean Shipping Co. Reported to have been scrapped in 1987.

== Rotanin ==
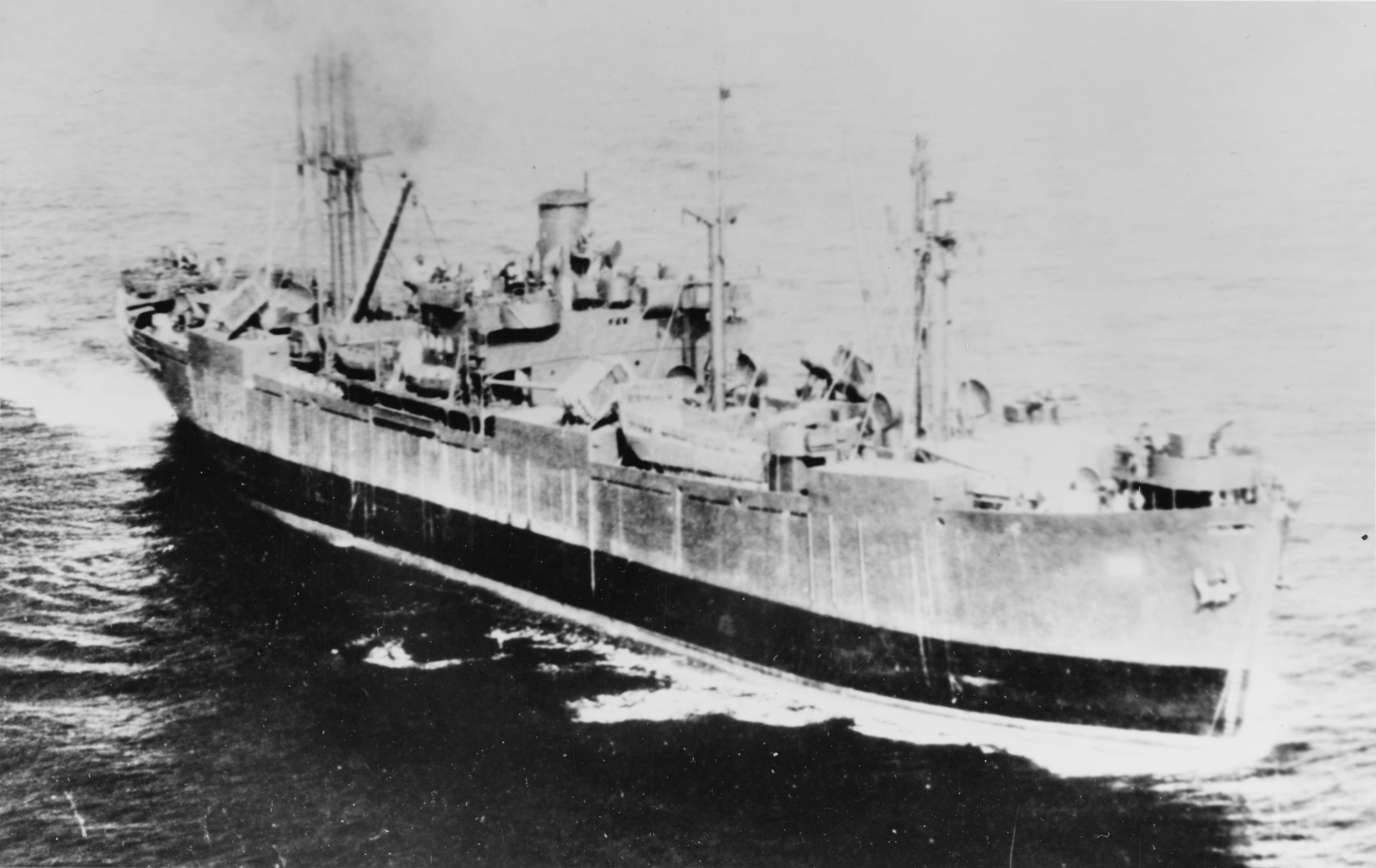
USS Rotanin

Rotanin was built by California Shipbuilding Corporation. Her keel was laid on 25 July 1943. She was launched as William Kelly on 18 August and delivered as Rotanin on 6 September. To the United States Navy. Returned to the WSA in April 1946 and renamed William Kelly. Laid up in reserve in Suisun Bay. She was scrapped at Richmond in September 1966.

== Roy James Cole ==
Roy James Cole was built by J. A. Jones Construction Company, Brunswick. Her keel was laid on 23 January 1945. She was launched on 28 February and delivered on 17 March. Built for the WSA, she was operated under the management of Blidberg Rothchild Company. Management transferred to Lykes Brothers Steamship Company in 1946. She was laid up at Beaumont in 1949. Sold in 1951 to Phoenix Steamship Corp. and renamed North Heaven. Sold later that year to Merchants Steamship Corp. Operated under the management of Orion Shipping & Trading Co. Sold in 1954 to Rio Anton Compania Armadora, Panama and renamed Delphi. Reflagged to Liberia and operated under the management of Anamanthos Ship Operating Co. Management transferred to Syros Shipping Co. in 1959. Sold in 1960 to Mavmen Compania Navigation, Panama. Reflagged to Greece and operated under the management of Hesperus Shipping Corp. Management transferred to Syros Shipping Co. in 1962. Sold in 1964 to First Navigation Corp., Panama and renamed Ever Strength. Reflagged to Liberia and operated under the management of First Steamship Co. Sold in 1967 to Oceanic Transportation Inc., Hong Kong and renamed Grand Dolphin, remaining under the Liberian flag. She was scrapped at Kaohsiung in June 1970.

== Roy K. Johnson ==
Roy K. Johnson was built by Delta Shipbuilding Company. Her keel was laid on 30 December 1944. She was launched on 7 February 1945 and delivered on 28 February. Built for the WSA, she was operated under the management of Calmar Steamship Company. Management transferred to Alcoa Steamship Co. in 1946. She was laid up at Beaumont in 1948. Sold in 1951 to Cape Horn Steamship Corp. and renamed Seagallant. Sold later that year to Oceanic Waterways Corp. Operated under the management of Orion Shipping & Trading Co. Sold in 1953 to National Shipping & Trading Co., New York and renamed Admiral Dewey. Sold in 1954 to Monteverde Compania Armadora and renamed National Leader. Reflagged to Liberia and operated under the management of Carolus S.A. Sold in 1960 to Transandina Compania Navigation, Panama and renamed Arie H., remaining under the Liberian flag and operated under the management of Paul Hydreas. Renamed Aristea in 1962. Sold in 1966 to Transworld Navigation Co. and renamed Beata. Operated under the management of Welcome Ship Operating Co. She was scrapped at Kaohsiung in July 1968.

== Royal S. Copeland ==
Royal S. Copeland was built by St. Johns River Shipbuilding Company. Her keel was laid on 24 November 1943. She was launched on 11 January 1944 and delivered on 22 January. Built for the WSA, she was operated under the management of Parry Navigation Co. To the French Government in 1947 and renamed Les Glières. Operated under the management of Compagnie des Messageries Maritimes. Sold in 1959 to Compania Estrella Blanca Ltda., Panama and renamed Nictric. Reflagged to Lebanon and operated under the management of Wigham, Richardson & Co. She caught fire at Chittagong on 14 June 1967. Declared a constructive total loss, she was scrapped at Kaohsiung in September 1968.

== R. P. Warner ==
R. P. Warner was built by Oregon Shipbuilding Corporation. Her keel was laid on 22 July 1943. She was launched on 10 August and delivered on 17 August. Built for the WSA, she was operated under the management of American Mail Lines. Sold in 1947 to Dimitrios C. Georgopoulos, Syra, Greece and renamed Syros. Operated under the management of Blidberg Rothchild Company. Management transferred to Maritime Trade Corp. in 1950. She ran aground at Cherrystone Hill, Bermuda on 20 January 1955 whilst on a voyage from Amsterdam to the Hampton Roads. Refloated on 1 February and towed in to Hamilton, Bermuda. Declared a constructive total loss. Sold to Villalba Compania Navigation, Panama. Repaired and renamed Alba. Reflagged to Liberia, operated under the management of Cargo & Tankship Management Corp. Sold in 1962 to Lanena Shipping Co., Hong Kong and renamed Zafiro. Reflagged to Panama. Sold in 1967 to Ficodam Shipping Co., Panama and renamed Tillie. Operated under the management of Intercontinental Shipping Co. She was scrapped at Kaohsiung in 1968.

== R. S. Wilson ==
R. S. Wilson was built by Delta Shipbuilding Company. Her keel was laid on 16 December 1943. She was launched on 9 February 1944 and delivered on 5 March. She ran aground at Boston on 31 December 1945 whilst on a voyage from Newport News to Boston. She was later refloated. Declared a constructive total loss, she was laid up in the James River. She was scrapped at Baltimore in January 1959.

== Ruben Dario ==
Ruben Dario was built by Southeastern Shipbuilding Corporation. Her keel was laid on 1 May 1944. She was launched on 22 June and delivered on 13 July. Built for the WSA, she was operated under the management of International Freighting Corp. She was scrapped at Philadelphia in March 1963.

== Rudolph Kauffmann ==
Rudolph Kauffmann was built by Southeastern Shipbuilding Corporation. Her keel was laid on 23 October 1944. She was launched on 29 November and delivered on 15 December. Laid up at Beaumont post-war, she was scrapped at Brownsville in August 1972.

== Rufus C. Dawes ==
Rufus C. Dawes was built by St. Johns River Shipbuilding Company. Her keel was laid on 31 May 1943. She was launched on 4 September and delivered on 18 September. She was scrapped at Tacoma in March 1968.

== Rufus Choate ==
Rufus Choate was built by Todd Houston Shipbuilding Corporation. Her keel was laid on 8 April 1944. She was launched on 17 May and delivered on 30 May. Laid up in the James River post-war, she was scrapped at Santander in February 1971.

== Rufus E. Foster ==
Rufus E. Foster was built by Delta Shipbuilding Company. Her keel was laid on 24 December 1943. She was launched on 17 February 1944 and delivered on 31 March. Built for the WSA, she was operated under the management of Mississippi Shipping Co. To the Dutch Government in 1946 and renamed Leeghwater. Renamed Lieve Vrouwekerk in 1947 and placed under the management of Vereenigde Nederlandsche Scheepvaarts Maatschappij, Den Haag. Sold to her managers in 1950. Driven ashore on Vlieland, Netherlands on 20 January 1960 whilst on a voyage from Hamburg to Antwerp. She was refloated on 26 February. She was scrapped at Dunston-on-Tyne, United Kingdom in April 1960.

== Rufus King ==
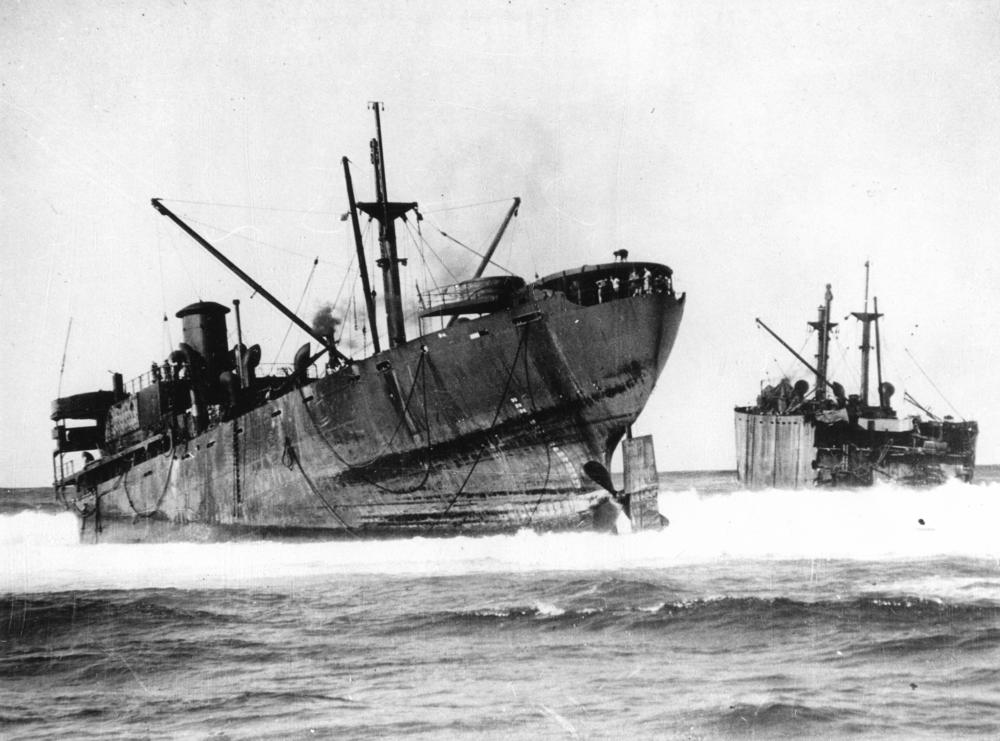
The wreck of Rufus King.

Rufus King was built by California Shipbuilding Corporation. Her keel was laid on 6 October 1941. She was launched on 11 March 1942 and delivered on 29 May. Built for the WSA, she was operated under the management of Pacific Far East Lines. She was driven ashore at Point Lookout, Australia on 7 July 1942 whilst on a voyage from Los Angeles to Brisbane, Australia. She broke in two and was declared a total loss. The bow section was salvaged by the United States Army and towed to Milne Bay. It was rebuilt as a lighter, dubbed Half Rufus. The stern section was used as a target ship by the Royal Australian Air Force.

== Rufus W. Peckham ==
Rufus W. Peckham was built by Bethlehem Fairfield Shipyard. Her keel was laid on 22 December 1942. She was launched on 13 February 1943 and delivered on 28 February. Built for the WSA, she was operated under the management of A. H. Bull & Co. Management transferred to James Griffiths & Sons in 1946. Laid up at Astoria, Oregon in 1948. Sold in 1951 to Phoenix Steamship Corp. and renamed Seagale. Operated under the management of Orion Shipping & Trading Co. Sold later that year to Seatraders Inc., New York and renamed Sea Gale. Sold in 1953 to Trident Transport Corp., New York and renamed Nicholas C. H. Sold in 1954 to Mendosa Compania Navigation, Panama and renamed Pitsa H. Reflagged to Panama and operated under the management of Trident Transport Corp. Management transferred to Jason Shipping & Trading Corp. in 1956. Sold in 1958 to Ocean Carriers Corp., New York and renamed Valiant Effort. She struck a reef off Ras el Djebel, Tunisia on 18 January 1959 whilst on a voyage from Galveston, Texas, United States to Calcutta. She broke in two and was declared a total loss.

== Russell A. Alger ==
Russell A. Alger was built by Kaiser Shipbuilding Company, Vancouver, Washington. She was completed in March 1943. Laid up at Beaumont post-war, she was sold for scrapping at Brownsville in May 1973.

== Russell H. Chittenden ==
Russell H. Chittenden was built by California Shipbuilding Corporation. Her keel was laid on 19 January 1944. She was launched on 12 February and delivered on 29 February. Built for the WSA, she was operated under the management of McCormick Steamship Co. She was driven ashore and wrecked on Vassel Island, New Guinea (5°55′S 149°10′E) on 13 March 1945 whilst on a voyage from Hollandia to Langemak Bay.

== Russell R. Jones ==
Russell R. Jones was built by Todd Houston Shipbuilding Corporation. Her keel was laid on 15 December 1944. She was launched on 18 January 1945 and delivered on 27 January. Built for the WSA, she was operated under the management of Overlake Freight Transport. Management transferred to Pope & Talbot Inc. in 1947. Sold in 1951 to Pegor Steamship Corp., New York and renamed Pegor. Placed under the management of World Tramping Agencies in 1956. Renamed Pacific Wave in 1958. Sold in 1960 to China Maritime Trust, Taipei, Taiwan and renamed Ching Yung. Reflagged to China. Reflagged to Taiwan in 1965. She was scrapped at Kaohsiung in February 1967.

== Russell Sage ==
Russell Sage was built by J. A. Jones Construction Company, Panama City. Her keel was laid on 25 November 1943. She was launched on 5 January 1944 and delivered on 29 February. Built for the WSA, she was operated under the management of Marine Transport Lines. Sold in 1947 to Caribbean Land & Shipping Corp., Cristóbal, Panama and renamed Glen I. Operated under the management of T. Gotaas & Co. Sold in 1950 to Compani de Navigation La Cordillera. Operated under the management of D'Amico Società di Navigazione, Rome. Sold in 1954 to Flamenco Compania Navigation Transoceanica, remaining under the same flag and managers. Renamed Maria Dolores in 1955. Sold to her managers in 1958. Sold in 1965 to Militades Navegaceon and renamed Nikolis M. Reflagged to Greece and operated under the management of Mattheos Mavridoglou. She ran aground in the Catalina Shallow, off Isabela de Sagua, Cuba (23°00′N 73°58′W) on 16 February 1967. She was refloated on 23 February and put in to Isabela de Sagua, where she was declared a compromised total loss.

== Rutilicus ==
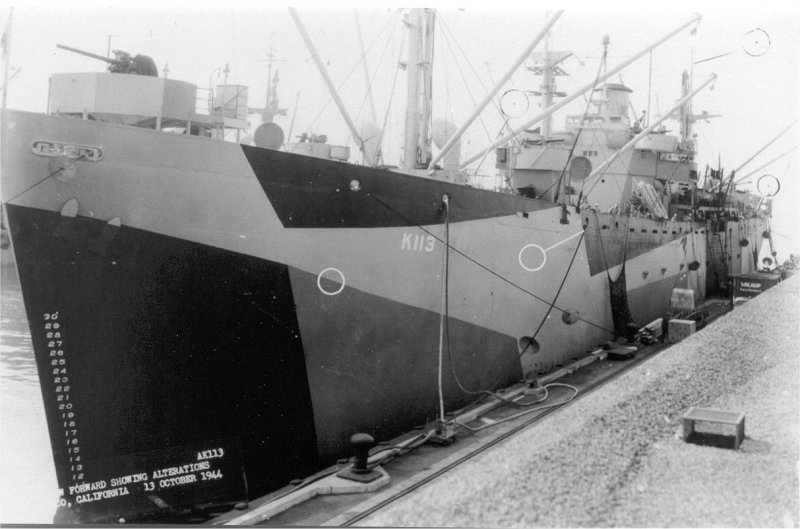
USS Rutilicus

Rutilicus was built by California Shipbuilding Corporation. Her keel was laid on 2 April 1943. She was launched on 26 April and delivered on 8 May. To United States Navy in October 1943 and renamed Rutilicus. Returned to WSA in December 1945 and renamed Andrew Rowan. Laid up in the James River, she was scrapped at Gandia in February 1972.

== R. Walton Moore ==
R. Walton Moore was built by J. A. Jones Construction Company, Brunswick. Her keel was laid on 1 July 1944. She was launched on 14 August and delivered on 26 August. Built for the WSA, she was operated under the management of Parry Navigation Co. She was scrapped at Tacoma in May 1961.
