= Robert Banks =

Robert Banks may refer to:

- Robert Banks (American football) (born 1963), former American football defensive end
- Robert Banks (chemist) (1921–1989), co-inventor of high-density polyethylene
- Robert Banks (filmmaker) (born 1966), American experimental filmmaker from Cleveland
- Robert Banks (musician) (born 1930), pianist, organist and composer
- Robert Banks (optician) (19th century), English maker of optical instruments
- Robert Banks (politician) (born 1937), Conservative MP for Harrogate before 1992
- Robert J. Banks (theologian) (born 1939), Australian theologian
- Robert Joseph Banks (1928–2026), retired bishop of the Roman Catholic Diocese of Green Bay
- Robert Richardson Banks (1812–1872), English architect
- Robert T. Banks (1822–1901), American politician
- Bob Banks (1930–2024), Australian rugby league player
- SS Robert J. Banks, a Liberty ship

== See also ==
- Robert Banks Stewart (1931–2016), Scottish television scriptwriter
- Roberts Bank, an undersea bank near Vancouver, British Columbia
