= List of shipwrecks in September 1945 =

The list of shipwrecks in September 1945 includes ships sunk, foundered, grounded, or otherwise lost during September 1945.

== 1 September ==
List of shipwrecks: 1 September 1945
Ship	State	Description
Thekla	Germany	The cargo ship exploded at Florø, Norway, during loading of ammunition. Nineteen people were killed; seven Germans, ten Norwegians imprisoned on charges of treason, one British soldier and one Norwegian guard.

== 2 September ==
List of shipwrecks: 2 September 1945
Ship	State	Description
Unknown tug	Imperial Japanese Army	A tugboat struck a mine and sank off Pusan, South Korea. 22 killed.

== 6 September ==
List of shipwrecks: 6 September 1945
Ship	State	Description
Robert Battley	United States	The Liberty ship ran aground at Bilaa Point, Mindanao, Philippines. She was on a voyage from Batangas, Philippines to San Francisco, California. She was refloated and found to be severely damaged. Consequently withdrawn from service.

== 8 September ==
List of shipwrecks: 5 September 1945
Ship	State	Description
Empress of Russia	Canada	The ocean liner was gutted by fire at Barrow-in-Furness, Lancashire, United Kingdom. She was declared a constructive total loss and scrapped.
L'Audacieuse	French Navy	First Indochina War; Battle of Hong Hai: The auxiliary patrol boat/naval junk was scuttled to prevent capture. Eight crewmen were taken as prisoners of war.

== 10 September ==
List of shipwrecks: 5 September 1945
Ship	State	Description
Joseph Carrigan	United States	The Liberty ship struck a mine off Labuan, Malaya and was damaged. She was on a voyage from Morotai, Netherlands East Indies to Labuan. She put in to Manila, Netherlands East Indies, where she was declared a constructive total loss.
Unknown	Flag unknown	A tug was wrecked at Rabaul, New Guinea. She was salvaged by HMAS Reserve (Royal Australian Navy) on 23 September and towed to Madang on 26 September. Sold in 1946.

== 11 September ==
List of shipwrecks: 11 September 1945
Ship	State	Description
USS PC-815	United States Navy	The PC-461-class submarine chaser sank in the Pacific Ocean off San Diego, California, at 32°37′54″N 117°14′12″W with the loss of one crew member after colliding with the destroyer USS Laffey (United States Navy).

== 12 September ==
List of shipwrecks: 12 September 1945
Ship	State	Description
Marianne Toft	Denmark	The cargo ship collided with Cornelius Ford (United States) and sank in the Irish Sea off the Isle of Man with the loss of ten of her twenty crew.

== 13 September ==
List of shipwrecks: 13 September 1945
Ship	State	Description
Empire Simba	United Kingdom	The cargo ship was scuttled in the Atlantic Ocean (55°30′N 11°00′W) with a cargo of obsolete chemical ammunition.

== 15 September ==
List of shipwrecks: 15 September 1945
Ship	State	Description
T-175	Imperial Japanese Navy	The No. 103-class landing ship was heavily damaged in a typhoon off Urasaki and beached. Scrapped in 1948.

== 16 September ==
List of shipwrecks: 16 September 1945
Ship	State	Description
USS AFD-13	United States Navy	Typhoon Ida: The mobile floating drydock was sunk off Okinawa, Japan.
HMS BYMS-275	Royal Navy	Typhoon Ida: The BYMS-class minesweepers foundered.
HMS BYMS-383	Royal Navy	Typhoon Ida: The BYMS-class minesweepers foundered.
HMS BYMS-384	Royal Navy	Typhoon Ida: The BYMS-class minesweepers foundered.
HMS BYMS-424	Royal Navy	Typhoon Ida: The BYMS-class minesweepers foundered.
HMS BYMS-454	Royal Navy	Typhoon Ida: The BYMS-class minesweepers foundered.
Richard V. Oulahan	United States	Typhoon Ida: The Liberty ship came ashore at Okinawa and was declared a constructive total loss.
USS SC-632	United States Navy	Typhoon Ida: The SC-497-class submarine chaser foundered during a typhoon off Okinawa. The sunken hulk was destroyed on 9 March 1948.
USS YMS-98	United States Navy	Typhoon Ida: The YMS-1-class minesweeper foundered off Okinawa.
USS YMS-341	United States Navy	Typhoon Ida: The YMS-1-class minesweeper foundered off Okinawa.

== 17 September ==
List of shipwrecks: 17 September 1945
Ship	State	Description
John A. Rawlins	United States	The Liberty ship was driven ashore in a typhoon at Okinawa, Japan, a total loss.

== 18 September ==
List of shipwrecks: 18 September 1945
Ship	State	Description
CHa-160	Imperial Japanese Navy	World War II: The CHa-1-class submarine chaser sank off Yoshimi during a typhoon.
Cha-228	Imperial Japanese Navy	The CHa-1-class submarine chaser foundered at Sasebo in a storm.
USS YMS-478	United States Navy	Typhoon Ida: The patrol craft capsized at Wakanoura Wan, Japan.

== 19 September ==
List of shipwrecks: 19 September 1945
Ship	State	Description
CDa-1 and CDa-2	Imperial Japanese Navy	The incomplete CDa-1-class auxiliary frigates foundered at Uranosaki from leaks.
Mandal	Norway	The whaler was wrecked off Farsund, Norway.
Minerve	France	The Minerve-class submarine was being towed to France from England, but broke free in heavy weather and was wrecked on Portland Bill.

== 22 September ==
List of shipwrecks: 22 September 1945
Ship	State	Description
USS LST-553	United States Navy	The landing ship tank struck a mine and sank in Japanese waters.
USS LST-768	United States Navy	The landing ship tank struck a mine and sank in Japanese waters.
Prince George	Canada	The passenger steamer (3,372 GRT, 1910) caught fire after running aground in fog off Ketchikan, Territory of Alaska. After her 103 crewmen and 10 passengers abandoned ship, the fire began to threaten facilities in the harbor at Ketchikan, so the tug General Kennedy (Canada) towed her to Pennock Island in Tongass Narrows, where the fire burned itself out. One fireman was killed. The wreck eventually was refloated and scrapped.

== 24 September ==
List of shipwrecks: 24 September 1945
Ship	State	Description
Nordhavet	Denmark	The cargo ship struck a submerged object and sank in the Atlantic Ocean off Point Lance, Dominion of Newfoundland (46°47′N 54°08′W).

== 25 September ==
List of shipwrecks: 25 September 1945
Ship	State	Description
Edinburgh Castle	United Kingdom	The passenger ship was scuttled in the Atlantic Ocean 60 nautical miles (110 km) off Freetown, Sierra Leone by HMT Cape Warwick, HMS Launceston Castle and HMS Portchester Castle (all Royal Navy).

== 29 September ==
List of shipwrecks: 29 September 1945
Ship	State	Description
Empire Patrol	United Kingdom	The cargo ship caught fire in the Mediterranean Sea 38 nautical miles (70 km) off Port Said, Egypt and was abandoned by her crew and the 496 refugees she was carrying. She was taken in tow but capsized and sank two days later when still 18 nautical miles (33 km) off Port Said.
USS Roche	United States Navy	The Cannon-class destroyer escort struck a mine and was damaged in the Pacific Ocean with the loss of three of her 216 crew. She was subsequently declared a constructive total loss and sunk off Yokosuka, Japan on 11 March 1946.

== 30 September ==
List of shipwrecks: 30 September 1945
Ship	State	Description
Two unidentified LCVPs	United States Navy	Typhoon Jean: The LCVPs, being transported as deck cargo on USS Feldspar (United States Navy), were washed overboard and lost in the Pacific Ocean between The Philippines and Okinawa.
