= SS Julius Rosenwald =

Liberty ship of WWII

History

United States
- Name: Julius Rosenwald
- Namesake: Julius Rosenwald
- Owner: War Shipping Administration (WSA)
- Operator: Blidberg & Rothchild Co., Inc.
- Ordered: as type (EC2-S-C1) hull, MC hull 1533
- Builder: J.A. Jones Construction, Panama City, Florida
- Cost: $1,710,928
- Yard number: 15
- Way number: 3
- Laid down: 7 July 1943
- Launched: 13 September 1943
- Completed: 29 September 1943
- Identification: Call Signal: KXWZ
- Fate: Sold to Italy, 15 December 1946, removed from fleet, 27 December 1946

Italy
- Name: Assiria
- Acquired: 27 December 1946
- Fate: Scrapped, 1963

General characteristics
- Class & type: Liberty ship; type EC2-S-C1, standard
- Tonnage: 10,865 LT DWT; 7,176 GRT
- Displacement: 3,380 long tons (3,434 t) (light); 14,245 long tons (14,474 t) (max)
- Length: 441 feet 6 inches (135 m) oa; 416 feet (127 m) pp; 427 feet (130 m) lwl
- Beam: 57 feet (17 m)
- Draft: 27 ft 9.25 in (8.4646 m)
- Installed power: 2 × Oil fired 450 °F (232 °C) boilers, operating at 220 psi (1,500 kPa); 2,500 hp (1,900 kW)
- Propulsion: 1 × triple-expansion steam engine, (manufactured by Filer and Stowell, Milwaukee, Wisconsin); 1 × screw propeller
- Speed: 11.5 knots (21.3 km/h; 13.2 mph)
- Capacity: 562,608 cubic feet (15,931 m^{3}) (grain); 499,573 cubic feet (14,146 m^{3}) (bale)
- Complement: 38–62 USMM; 21–40 USNAG
- Armament: Varied by ship; Bow-mounted 3-inch (76 mm)/50-caliber gun; Stern-mounted 4-inch (102 mm)/50-caliber gun; 2–8 × single 20-millimeter (0.79 in) Oerlikon anti-aircraft (AA) cannons and/or, 2–8 × 37-millimeter (1.46 in) M1 AA guns

SS Julius Rosenwald was a Liberty ship built in the United States during World War II to support international shipping and supply. She was named after Julius Rosenwald, co-owner of Sears, Roebuck and Company, founder of the Rosenwald Fund, and principal founder and backer of the Museum of Science and Industry in Chicago.

== Construction ==
Julius Rosenwald was laid down on 7 July 1943, under a United States Maritime Commission (MARCOM) contract, MC hull 1533, by J.A. Jones Construction, Panama City, Florida; she was launched on 13 September 1943.

== History ==
She was allocated to Blidberg & Rothchild Co., Inc., on 29 September 1943. On 15 December 1946, she was sold to the Italian Government, for $544,506, which in turn sold her to Adriatica Socite Anon di Navigazione, on 27 December 1946. She was renamed Assiria and scrapped in 1963.

== Bibliography ==
- "Jones Construction, Panama City FL". ShipbuildingHistory.com. 13 October 2010.
- Maritime Administration. "Julius Rosenwald". Ship History Database Vessel Status Card. U.S. Department of Transportation, Maritime Administration.
- Davies, James (May 2004). "Specifications (As-Built)" (PDF). p. 23.
- "SS Julius Rosenwald".
