= SS A. J. Cermak =

Liberty ship of WWII

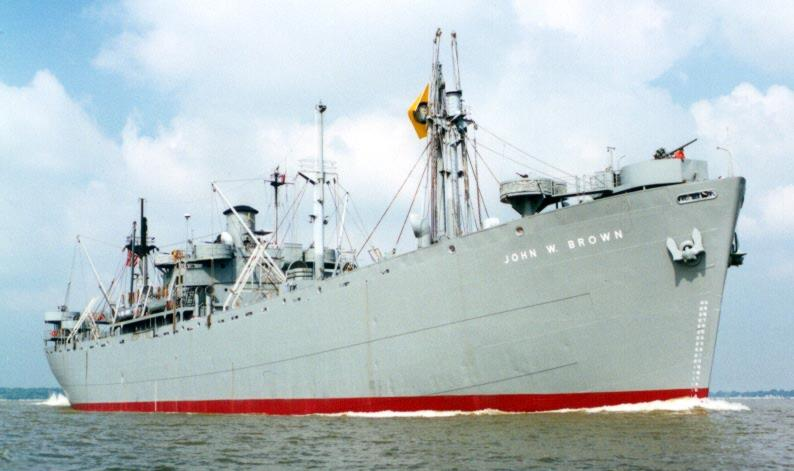
- SS John W. Brown, another Liberty Ship.

History

United States
- Name: A. J. Cermak
- Namesake: Anton Cermak
- Owner: War Shipping Administration (WSA)
- Operator: Blidberg & Rothchild Co., Inc.
- Ordered: as type (EC2-S-C1) hull, MCE hull 1836
- Awarded: 24 December 1942
- Builder: Bethlehem-Fairfield Shipyard, Baltimore, Maryland
- Cost: $918,360
- Yard number: 2284
- Way number: 8
- Laid down: 9 November 1943
- Launched: 30 November 1943
- Completed: 8 December 1943
- Identification: U.S. Official Number 244777; Call sign: KVDZ
- Fate: Laid up in the National Defense Reserve Fleet, Wilmington, North Carolina, 16 March 1948; Sold for scrapping, 27 March 1964, removed from fleet, 11 April 1964

General characteristics
- Class & type: Liberty ship; type EC2-S-C1, standard
- Tonnage: 10,865 LT DWT; 7,176 GRT
- Displacement: 3,380 long tons (3,434 t) (light); 14,245 long tons (14,474 t) (max)
- Length: 441 feet 6 inches (135 m) oa; 416 feet (127 m) pp; 427 feet (130 m) lwl
- Beam: 57 feet (17 m)
- Draft: 27 ft 9.25 in (8.4646 m)
- Installed power: 2 × Oil fired 450 °F (232 °C) boilers, operating at 220 psi (1,500 kPa); 2,500 hp (1,900 kW)
- Propulsion: 1 × triple-expansion steam engine, (manufactured by General Machinery Corp., Hamilton, Ohio); 1 × screw propeller
- Speed: 11.5 knots (21.3 km/h; 13.2 mph)
- Capacity: 562,608 cubic feet (15,931 m^{3}) (grain); 499,573 cubic feet (14,146 m^{3}) (bale)
- Complement: 38–62 USMM; 21–40 USNAG
- Armament: Varied by ship; Bow-mounted 3-inch (76 mm)/50-caliber gun; Stern-mounted 4-inch (102 mm)/50-caliber gun; 2–8 × single 20-millimeter (0.79 in) Oerlikon anti-aircraft (AA) cannons and/or, 2–8 × 37-millimeter (1.46 in) M1 AA guns

SS A. J. Cermak was a Liberty ship built in the United States during World War II. She was named after Anton Cermak, an American politician. Cermak was the Mayor of Chicago from 1931 until his assassination in 1933 while meeting with President Franklin D. Roosevelt.

== Construction ==
A. J. Cermak was laid down on 9 November 1943, under a Maritime Commission (MARCOM) contract, MCE hull 1836, by the Bethlehem-Fairfield Shipyard, Baltimore, Maryland; and was launched on 30 November 1943. Upon completion and delivery on 8 December 1943 to the War Shipping Administration (WSA) the ship was placed in operation Blidberg & Rothchild Co., Inc. as WSA agent under a General Agency Agreement. The ship was registered with U.S. Official Number 244777, signal KVDZ, 7,176 GRT, 4,380 tons net, 422.8 ft (128.9 m) registry length, 57 ft (17.4 m) beam and depth of 34.8 ft (10.6 m) with crew of 43 homeported at Baltimore.

== History ==
A. J. Cermak was in the 37 ship convoy UGS-37 east of Algiers on the night of April 11/12 1944 when the convoy came under air attack. The ship was credited with one assist in shooting down an attacking aircraft.

On 16 March 1948, she was laid up in the National Defense Reserve Fleet, Wilmington, North Carolina. The ship had been under tow destined for the Military Sea Transportation Service but was diverted to lay up. Under award on 27 March 1964 the ship was sold for scrapping to Northern Metal Co., for $45,045. She was removed from the fleet on 11 April 1964.

== Bibliography ==
- Colton, Tim (14 August 2008). "Bethlehem-Fairfield, Baltimore MD". ShipbuildingHistory.
- Maritime Administration. "A. J. Cermak". Ship History Database Vessel Status Card. U.S. Department of Transportation, Maritime Administration.
- Davies, James (May 2004). "Specifications (As-Built)" (PDF). p. 23.
- "SS A. J. Cermak".
- Office of Naval Operations (1946). "Chapter VIII, Six Mediterranean Convoys". HyperWar: US Naval Admin in WW II: History of the Naval Armed Guard Afloat.
- Treasury Department (1944). Merchant Vessels of the United States 1944. Washington, D.C.: United States Treasury Department, Bureau of Customs. p. 7.
