= SS Rufus W. Peckham =

Liberty ship of WWII

History

United States
- Name: Rufus W. Peckham
- Namesake: Rufus W. Peckham
- Owner: War Shipping Administration (WSA)
- Operator: A.H. Bull & Co. Inc.
- Ordered: as type (EC2-S-C1) hull, MCE hull 940
- Awarded: 30 January 1942
- Builder: Bethlehem-Fairfield Shipyard, Baltimore, Maryland
- Cost: $1,073,464
- Yard number: 2090
- Way number: 7
- Laid down: 22 December 1942
- Launched: 13 February 1943
- Completed: 28 February 1943
- Identification: Call sign: KKAQ
- Fate: Laid up in Reserve Fleet, 8 October 1948, sold for service 27 February 1951

United States
- Owner: Phoenix SS Corp.
- Renamed: Seagale
- Fate: Sold, October 1951

United States
- Owner: Seatraders Inc.
- Operator: Orion Shipping & Trading Co.
- Renamed: Sea Gale
- Fate: Sold, May 1953

United States
- Owner: Trident Transportation Corp.
- Renamed: Nicholas C. H.
- Fate: Sold, June 1954

Panama
- Name: Pitsa H.
- Owner: Mendoza Cia. Nav.
- Operator: Trident Transportation Corp. (1954-1956); Jason Shipping & Trading Corp. (1956-1958)
- Fate: Sold, 10 December 1958

United States
- Owner: Ocean Carriers Corp.
- Renamed: Valiant Effort
- Fate: Sunk, 17 January 1959

General characteristics
- Class & type: Liberty ship; type EC2-S-C1, standard
- Tonnage: 10,865 LT DWT; 7,176 GRT
- Displacement: 3,380 long tons (3,434 t) (light); 14,245 long tons (14,474 t) (max)
- Length: 441 feet 6 inches (135 m) oa; 416 feet (127 m) pp; 427 feet (130 m) lwl
- Beam: 57 feet (17 m)
- Draft: 27 ft 9.25 in (8.4646 m)
- Installed power: 2 × Oil fired 450 °F (232 °C) boilers, operating at 220 psi (1,500 kPa); 2,500 hp (1,900 kW)
- Propulsion: 1 × triple-expansion steam engine, (manufactured by General Machinery Corp., Hamilton, Ohio); 1 × screw propeller
- Speed: 11.5 knots (21.3 km/h; 13.2 mph)
- Capacity: 562,608 cubic feet (15,931 m^{3}) (grain); 499,573 cubic feet (14,146 m^{3}) (bale)
- Complement: 38–62 USMM; 21–40 USNAG
- Armament: Varied by ship; Bow-mounted 3-inch (76 mm)/50-caliber gun; Stern-mounted 4-inch (102 mm)/50-caliber gun; 2–8 × single 20-millimeter (0.79 in) Oerlikon anti-aircraft (AA) cannons and/or, 2–8 × 37-millimeter (1.46 in) M1 AA guns

SS Rufus W. Peckham was a Liberty ship built in the United States during World War II. She was named after Rufus W. Peckham, an American lawyer and jurist who served as an Associate Justice of the Supreme Court of the United States, from 1896 to 1909.

== Construction ==
Rufus W. Peckham was laid down on 22 December 1942, under a Maritime Commission (MARCOM) contract, MCE hull 940, by the Bethlehem-Fairfield Shipyard, Baltimore, Maryland; she was launched on 13 February 1943.

== History ==
She was allocated to the A.H. Bull & Co. Inc., on 28 February 1943.

On 8 October 1948, she was laid up in the National Defense Reserve Fleet, in Astoria, Oregon. On 25 January 1951, she was sold to Phoenix SS Corp.. After numerous name changes and sales to other shipping companies, she was wrecked and sunk, on 17 January 1959, Tunisia, after her steering gear failed in heavy weather. She beached herself near Ras el Djebel, after she was abandoned by her crew.

== Bibliography ==
- "Bethlehem-Fairfield, Baltimore MD". www.ShipbuildingHistory.com. 7 August 2021.
- Maritime Administration. "Rufus W. Peckham". Ship History Database Vessel Status Card. U.S. Department of Transportation, Maritime Administration.
- Davies, James (May 2004). "Specifications (As-Built)" (PDF). p. 23.
- "SS Rufus W. Peckham".
