= Blidberg Rothchild Company =

Former USA Shipping Company

Blidberg Rothchild Company Blidberg & Sagen Company
- Company type: Private
- Industry: Freight transport, shipping
- Founded: 1920 in New York City
- Fate: closed 1970s
- Key people: Allan Blidberg; Sylvester Rothschild; Tryggve Sagen

Blidberg Rothchild Company was a shipping company founded by Allan Blidberg and Sylvester Rothschild in New York City, United States. The shipping company has is start with a previous company Blidberg and Sagen Company founded by Tryggve Sagen and Allan Blidberg. Tryggve Sagen owned a ship in Oslo, Norway before coming to the United States in 1919. Sylvester Rothschild was born in 1896 in Sweden, he was a finance officer in Gothenburg. Rothschild came to the US in 1919 and started the shipping company with Sagen. Blidberg and Sagen Company had shipping routes from New York to Scandinavian and Baltic ports. Sagen was president, Blidberg vice president and Sylvester Rothschild was the Secretary for the shipping company. Sylvester Rothschild was from Gothenburg, Sweden, where he was the vice-consul. In the 1930s Tryggve Sagen departed the company and the firm was renamed Blidberg Rothchild Company. The company had offices in Gothenburg and Norway. Blidberg Rothchild Company worked with an affiliated company Eastport Steamship Co of New York. Blidberg Rothchild Company also worked with an affiliated company, Bridgeport Steamship Line of New York, a New Haven Railroad company.

== World War II ==
During World War II Blidberg Rothchild Company operated merchant ships for the United States Shipping Board. During World War II Blidberg Rothchild Company was active with charter shipping with the Maritime Commission and War Shipping Administration. Blidberg Rothchild Company operated Liberty ships, Victory ships and tankers for the World War II United States Merchant Navy. The ship was run by its Blidberg Rothchild Company crew and the US Navy supplied United States Navy Armed Guards to man the deck guns and radio.

== Ships ==
Liberty ship of World War II

Victory ship of World War II

Ships operated by Blidberg Rothchild Company:

- Eastport, built by the Germans in 1937
- Opie Read, a ET1-S-C3 tanker. An Armadillo-class tanker.
  - Liberty ships:
- R. P. Warner
- SS Roy James Cole
- SS William P. Duval
- Simon Benson
- U.S.O.
- Joseph-Augustin Chevalier
- SS Julius Rosenwald
- SS A. J. Cermak
- SS William Cox
- Lawrence J. Brengle
- Lee S. Overman, mined and sunk off Le Havre, France on November 12, 1944.
- Brandon Victory
- Walter Frederick Kraft
- William Cox
- Bert Williams
- Andrew W. Preston
- George S. Boutwell
- Elijah Kellogg, stranded outside Karachi harbor, broke in two and sank on June 27, 1952.
- Harry Kirby
- Francis A. Retka
- SS John W. Griffiths
- James B. Aswell
  - Victory ships:
- Hood Victory, a troopship.
- Wellesley Victory

== See also ==
- Calmar Steamship Company
- Bethlehem Transportation Corporation
