= SS Roy James Cole =

World War II Liberty ship of the United States

History

United States
- Name: Roy James Cole
- Namesake: Roy James Cole
- Ordered: as type (EC2-S-C1) hull, MC hull 2403
- Builder: J.A. Jones Construction, Brunswick, Georgia
- Cost: $931,476
- Yard number: 188
- Way number: 6
- Laid down: 23 January 1945
- Launched: 28 February 1945
- Sponsored by: Mrs. Kenneth H. Cole
- Completed: 17 March 1945
- Identification: Call Signal: ANMX
- Fate: Laid up in the National Defense Reserve Fleet, Beaumont, Texas, 3 August 1949; Sold for commercial use, 2 March 1951

United States
- Name: North Heaven
- Operator: Merchants Steamship Corp.
- Acquired: 3 August 1949
- Fate: Sold, 4 February 1954

United States
- Operator: Delphi Steamship Co.
- Acquired: 4 February 1954
- Fate: Sold, September 1954

Liberia
- Acquired: September 1954
- Fate: Scrapped, 1970

General characteristics
- Class & type: Liberty ship; type EC2-S-C1, standard
- Tonnage: 10,865 LT DWT; 7,176 GRT
- Displacement: 3,380 long tons (3,434 t) (light); 14,245 long tons (14,474 t) (max)
- Length: 441 feet 6 inches (135 m) oa; 416 feet (127 m) pp; 427 feet (130 m) lwl
- Beam: 57 feet (17 m)
- Draft: 27 ft 9.25 in (8.4646 m)
- Installed power: 2 × Oil fired 450 °F (232 °C) boilers, operating at 220 psi (1,500 kPa); 2,500 hp (1,900 kW)
- Propulsion: 1 × triple-expansion steam engine, (manufactured by General Machinery Corp., Hamilton, Ohio); 1 × screw propeller
- Speed: 11.5 knots (21.3 km/h; 13.2 mph)
- Capacity: 562,608 cubic feet (15,931 m^{3}) (grain); 499,573 cubic feet (14,146 m^{3}) (bale)
- Complement: 38–62 USMM; 21–40 USNAG
- Armament: Varied by ship; Bow-mounted 3-inch (76 mm)/50-caliber gun; Stern-mounted 4-inch (102 mm)/50-caliber gun; 2–8 × single 20-millimeter (0.79 in) Oerlikon anti-aircraft (AA) cannons and/or, 2–8 × 37-millimeter (1.46 in) M1 AA guns

SS Roy James Cole was a Liberty ship built in the United States during World War II. She was named after Roy James Cole, who was lost at sea while he was the Chief engineer on SS Expositor, after she was torpedoed by German submarine U-606, on 22 February 1943, in the North Atlantic.

== Construction ==
Roy James Cole was laid down on 23 January 1945, under a Maritime Commission (MARCOM) contract, MC hull 2403, by J.A. Jones Construction, Brunswick, Georgia; she was sponsored by Mrs. Kenneth H. Cole, sister-in-law namesake, and launched on 28 February 1945.

== History ==
She was allocated to the Blidberg & Rothchild Co. Inc., on 17 March 1945. On 3 August 1949, she was laid up in the National Defense Reserve Fleet, in Beaumont, Texas. On 2 March 1951, she was sold to Merchants Steamship Corp., for commercial use and renamed North Heaven. On 4 February 1954, she was sold to Delphi Steamship Co. In September 1954, she was sold to a Liberian shipping company. She was scrapped in 1970.

== Bibliography ==
- "Jones Construction, Brunswick GA". www.ShipbuildingHistory.com. 13 October 2010.
- "Liberty Ships – World War II".
- Maritime Administration. "Roy James Cole". Ship History Database Vessel Status Card. U.S. Department of Transportation, Maritime Administration. Archived from the original on 12 December 2019.
- Davies, James (May 2004). "Specifications (As-Built)" (PDF). p. 23.
- "SS Roy James Cole".
