= SS Reverdy Johnson =

Liberty ship of WWII

History

United States
- Name: Reverdy Johnson
- Namesake: Reverdy Johnson
- Owner: War Shipping Administration (WSA)
- Operator: American Export Lines, Inc.
- Ordered: as type (EC2-S-C1) hull, MCE hull 51
- Awarded: 14 March 1941
- Builder: Bethlehem-Fairfield Shipyard, Baltimore, Maryland
- Cost: $1,075,325
- Yard number: 2038
- Way number: 10
- Laid down: 15 May 1942
- Launched: 10 July 1942
- Sponsored by: Miss Eliz R. Simpson
- Completed: 25 July 1942
- Identification: Call sign: KGBM
- Fate: Laid up in the National Defense Reserve Fleet, Wilmington, North Carolina, 5 May 1948; Sold for scrapping, 19 January 1967, withdrawn from fleet, 17 February 1965

General characteristics
- Class & type: Liberty ship; type EC2-S-C1, standard
- Tonnage: 10,865 LT DWT; 7,176 GRT
- Displacement: 3,380 long tons (3,434 t) (light); 14,245 long tons (14,474 t) (max)
- Length: 441 feet 6 inches (135 m) oa; 416 feet (127 m) pp; 427 feet (130 m) lwl
- Beam: 57 feet (17 m)
- Draft: 27 ft 9.25 in (8.4646 m)
- Installed power: 2 × Oil fired 450 °F (232 °C) boilers, operating at 220 psi (1,500 kPa); 2,500 hp (1,900 kW)
- Propulsion: 1 × triple-expansion steam engine, (manufactured by Worthington Pump & Machinery Corp, Harrison, New Jersey); 1 × screw propeller
- Speed: 11.5 knots (21.3 km/h; 13.2 mph)
- Capacity: 562,608 cubic feet (15,931 m^{3}) (grain); 499,573 cubic feet (14,146 m^{3}) (bale)
- Complement: 38–62 USMM; 21–40 USNAG
- Armament: Varied by ship; Bow-mounted 3-inch (76 mm)/50-caliber gun; Stern-mounted 4-inch (102 mm)/50-caliber gun; 2–8 × single 20-millimeter (0.79 in) Oerlikon anti-aircraft (AA) cannons and/or, 2–8 × 37-millimeter (1.46 in) M1 AA guns

SS Reverdy Johnson was a Liberty ship built in the United States during World War II. She was named after Reverdy Johnson, a statesman and jurist from Maryland. From 1845 to 1849, Johnson represented Maryland in the United States Senate as a Whig. From March 1849 until July 1850, Johnson was Attorney General of the United States under President Zachary Taylor. He represented the slave-owning defendant in the controversial 1857 case Dred Scott v. Sandford. In 1865, he defended Mary Surratt before a military tribunal. From 14 September 1868 until 13 May 1869, he served as the ambassador to the United Kingdom.

== Construction ==
Reverdy Johnson was laid down on 15 May 1942, under a Maritime Commission (MARCOM) contract, MCE hull 51, by the Bethlehem-Fairfield Shipyard, Baltimore, Maryland; she was sponsored by Miss Eliz R. Simpson, a direct descendant Reverdy Johnson, and was launched on 10 July 1942.

== History ==
She was allocated to American Export Lines, Inc., on 25 July 1942. On 5 May 1948, she was laid up in the National Defense Reserve Fleet, Wilmington, North Carolina. She was sold for scrapping on 19 January 1967, to Union Minerals & Alloys Corp., for $45,567.89. She was withdrawn from the fleet on 17 February 1967.

== Bibliography ==
- "Bethlehem-Fairfield, Baltimore MD". www.ShipbuildingHistory.com. 14 August 2008.
- Maritime Administration. "Reverdy Johnson". Ship History Database Vessel Status Card. U.S. Department of Transportation, Maritime Administration.
- Davies, James (May 2004). "Specifications (As-Built)" (PDF). p. 23.
- "SS Reverdy Johnson".
