= USS LST-553 =

1944 LST-542-class tank landing ship

History

United States
- Name: USS LST-553
- Builder: Missouri Valley Bridge and Iron Company, Evansville, Indiana
- Laid down: 24 January 1944
- Launched: 16 March 1944
- Sponsored by: Miss Agnes L. Maulding
- Commissioned: 22 April 1944
- Decommissioned: 13 February 1947
- Stricken: 25 April 1947
- Honors and awards: Five battle stars for World War II
- Fate: Transferred to United States Army 13 February 1947

General characteristics
- Class & type: LST-542-class tank landing ship
- Displacement: 1,780 long tons (1,809 t) light; 3,640 long tons (3,698 t) full load
- Length: 328 ft (100 m)
- Beam: 50 ft (15 m)
- Draft: Unloaded 2 ft 4 in (0.71 m) forward; 7 ft 6 in (2.29 m) aft; Full load: 8 ft 2 in (2.49 m) forward; 14 ft 1 in (4.29 m) aft
- Installed power: 1,800 horsepower (1.34 megawatts)
- Propulsion: Two 900-horsepower (0.67-megawatt) General Motors 12-567 diesel engines, two shafts, twin rudders
- Speed: 12 knots (22 km/h; 14 mph)
- Boats & landing craft carried: 2 x LCVPs
- Troops: 140 officers and enlisted men
- Complement: 8-10 officers, 100-115 enlisted men
- Armament: 2 × twin 40 mm gun mounts; 6 × single 40-millimeter gun mounts; 12 × 20 mm guns

USS LST-553 was a United States Navy LST-542-class tank landing ship in commission from 1944 to 1947.

== Construction and commissioning ==
LST-553 was laid down on 24 January 1944 at Evansville, Indiana, by the Missouri Valley Bridge and Iron Company. She was launched on 16 March 1944, sponsored by Miss Agnes L. Maulding, and commissioned on 22 April 1944.

== Service history ==
During World War II, LST-553 was assigned to the Pacific Theater of Operations. She participated in the capture and occupation of the southern Palau Islands in September and October 1944. She then took part in the Philippines campaign, participating in the Leyte landings in October and November 1944, the Lingayen Gulf landings in January 1945, and the landings at Zambales and Subic Bay in January 1945. She then participated in the assault on and occupation of Okinawa Gunto from April through June 1945.

Following the war, LST-553, commanded by Lieutenant William George Keat, conducted minesweeping operations in the waters surrounding the Home Islands of Japanin the Port of Yokohoma and performed occupation duty in the Far East (South China Sea) until late January 1947. Minesweeping Operations were conducted with mattresses padding the wheel house to buffer personnel from detonating mines, and occupation duties included survey visits by ships officers to both Hiroshima and Nagasaki. On 22 September 1945, she struck a mine and sank, but she was refloated and returned to service.

== Decommissioning and disposal ==
LST-553 was decommissioned on 13 February 1947 and transferred to the United States Army at Yokohama, Japan, the same day. She was stricken from the Navy List on 25 April 1947.

== Honors and awards ==
LST-553 received five battle stars for her World War II service.
