= SS Robert Battey =

World War II Liberty ship of the United States

History

United States
- Name: Robert Battey
- Namesake: Robert Battey
- Ordered: as type (EC2-S-C1) hull, MC hull 1506
- Builder: J.A. Jones Construction, Brunswick, Georgia
- Cost: $1,450,639
- Yard number: 122
- Way number: 6
- Laid down: 8 October 1943
- Launched: 30 November 1943
- Sponsored by: Mrs. Edwin L. Jones
- Completed: 10 December 1943
- Identification: Call Signal: KVCD
- Fate: Ran aground near Mindanao, Philippines, 6 September 1945; Laid up in National Defense Reserve Fleet, Subic Bay, Philippines, 4 January 1946; Transferred to and laid up in National Defense Reserve Fleet, Suisun Bay, California, 17 December 1946; Transferred to US Navy for target ship, 11 February 1964; Reported sunk as target February 1965

General characteristics
- Class & type: Liberty ship; type EC2-S-C1, standard
- Tonnage: 10,865 LT DWT; 7,176 GRT
- Displacement: 3,380 long tons (3,434 t) (light); 14,245 long tons (14,474 t) (max)
- Length: 441 feet 6 inches (135 m) oa; 416 feet (127 m) pp; 427 feet (130 m) lwl
- Beam: 57 feet (17 m)
- Draft: 27 ft 9.25 in (8.4646 m)
- Installed power: 2 × Oil fired 450 °F (232 °C) boilers, operating at 220 psi (1,500 kPa); 2,500 hp (1,900 kW)
- Propulsion: 1 × triple-expansion steam engine, (manufactured by General Machinery Corp., Hamilton, Ohio); 1 × screw propeller
- Speed: 11.5 knots (21.3 km/h; 13.2 mph)
- Capacity: 562,608 cubic feet (15,931 m^{3}) (grain); 499,573 cubic feet (14,146 m^{3}) (bale)
- Complement: 38–62 USMM; 21–40 USNAG
- Armament: Varied by ship; Bow-mounted 3-inch (76 mm)/50-caliber gun; Stern-mounted 4-inch (102 mm)/50-caliber gun; 2–8 × single 20-millimeter (0.79 in) Oerlikon anti-aircraft (AA) cannons and/or, 2–8 × 37-millimeter (1.46 in) M1 AA guns

SS Robert Battey was a Liberty ship built in the United States during World War II. She was named after Robert Battey, a Confederate States Army surgeon and later a civilian gynecologist.

== Construction ==
Robert Battey was laid down on 8 October 1943, under a Maritime Commission (MARCOM) contract, MC hull 1506, by J.A. Jones Construction, Brunswick, Georgia; sponsored by Mrs. Edwin L. Jones, daughter-in-law of J.A Jones secretary treasurer, Edwin L. Jones, and launched on 30 November 1943.

== History ==
She was allocated to the Cosmopolitan Shipping Co., on 10 December 1943. On or about 6 September 1945, she ran aground near Mindanao, Philippines, and was declared a constructive total loss (CTL). She was refloated and later laid up in the National Defense Reserve Fleet in Subic Bay, on 4 January 1946. On 17 December 1946, she was laid up in the National Defense Reserve Fleet in Suisun Bay, California. It was estimated that it would cost $150,000 to make Robert Battey seaworthy again but there are no records stating that the work was done. On 16 December 1964, the US Navy requested her for use as a target ship. On 11 February 1965, she was withdrawn from the reserve fleet and turned over to the Navy where she was presumably sunk.

== Bibliography ==
- "Jones Construction, Brunswick GA". www.ShipbuildingHistory.com. 13 October 2010.
- "Liberty Ships – World War II".
- Maritime Administration. "Robert Battey". Ship History Database Vessel Status Card. U.S. Department of Transportation, Maritime Administration. Archived from the original on 12 December 2019.
- Davies, James (May 2004). "Specifications (As-Built)" (PDF). p. 23.
- "SS Robert Battey".
