= Robert Banks (optician) =

English optician

Robert Banks (late 18th century-first half 19th century) was an English maker of optical instruments.

His workshop was located in the Strand, in central London, 1796–1827. The Museo di Fisica e Storia Naturale of Florence commissioned several optical instruments from him.
