= SS John P. Poe =

Liberty ship of WWII

History

United States
- Name: John P. Poe
- Namesake: John P. Poe
- Owner: War Shipping Administration (WSA)
- Operator: A.H. Bull & Co., Inc.
- Ordered: as type (EC2-S-C1) hull, MCE hull 54
- Awarded: 14 March 1941
- Builder: Bethlehem-Fairfield Shipyard, Baltimore, Maryland
- Cost: $1,086,227
- Yard number: 2041
- Way number: 12
- Laid down: 24 May 1942
- Launched: 24 July 1942
- Sponsored by: Mrs. Charles J. Bekay
- Completed: 31 July 1942
- Identification: Call sign: KGFR
- Fate: Laid up in the National Defense Reserve Fleet, Mobile, Alabama, 30 November 1949; Sold for scrapping, 28 October 1971, withdrawn from fleet, 21 December 1971

General characteristics
- Class & type: Liberty ship; type EC2-S-C1, standard
- Tonnage: 10,865 LT DWT; 7,176 GRT
- Displacement: 3,380 long tons (3,434 t) (light); 14,245 long tons (14,474 t) (max)
- Length: 441 feet 6 inches (135 m) oa; 416 feet (127 m) pp; 427 feet (130 m) lwl
- Beam: 57 feet (17 m)
- Draft: 27 ft 9.25 in (8.4646 m)
- Installed power: 2 × Oil fired 450 °F (232 °C) boilers, operating at 220 psi (1,500 kPa); 2,500 hp (1,900 kW)
- Propulsion: 1 × triple-expansion steam engine, (manufactured by Ellicott Machine Corp., Baltimore, Maryland); 1 × screw propeller
- Speed: 11.5 knots (21.3 km/h; 13.2 mph)
- Capacity: 562,608 cubic feet (15,931 m^{3}) (grain); 499,573 cubic feet (14,146 m^{3}) (bale)
- Complement: 38–62 USMM; 21–40 USNAG
- Armament: Varied by ship; Bow-mounted 3-inch (76 mm)/50-caliber gun; Stern-mounted 4-inch (102 mm)/50-caliber gun; 2–8 × single 20-millimeter (0.79 in) Oerlikon anti-aircraft (AA) cannons and/or, 2–8 × 37-millimeter (1.46 in) M1 AA guns

SS John P. Poe was a Liberty ship built in the United States during World War II. She was named after John P. Poe, the Attorney General of Maryland, from 1891 to 1895. Poe was the nephew of the poet Edgar Allan Poe. Poe was a lawyer as well as a leading member of the Maryland Democratic Party, and served as Dean of the University of Maryland School of Law.

== Construction ==
John P. Poe was laid down on 24 May 1942, under a Maritime Commission (MARCOM) contract, MCE hull 54, by the Bethlehem-Fairfield Shipyard, Baltimore, Maryland; she was sponsored by Mrs. Charles J. Bekay, the niece of Vice Admiral Emory S. Land, the Chairman of MARCOM, and was launched on 24 July 1942.

== History ==
She was allocated to A.H. Bull & Co., Inc., on 31 July 1942. On 30 November 1949, she was laid up in the National Defense Reserve Fleet, Mobile, Alabama. She was sold for scrapping on 28 October 1971, to Union Minerals & Alloys Corp. She was withdrawn from the fleet on 21 December 1971.

== Bibliography ==
- "Bethlehem-Fairfield, Baltimore MD". www.ShipbuildingHistory.com. 14 August 2008.
- Maritime Administration. "John P. Poe". Ship History Database Vessel Status Card. U.S. Department of Transportation, Maritime Administration.
- Davies, James (May 2004). "Specifications (As-Built)" (PDF). p. 23.
- "SS John P. Poe".
