= SS Richard Bassett =

Liberty ship of WWII

History

United States
- Name: Richard Bassett
- Namesake: Richard Bassett
- Owner: War Shipping Administration (WSA)
- Operator: A. H. Bull Steamship Company
- Ordered: as type (EC2-S-C1) hull, MCE hull 41
- Awarded: 14 March 1941
- Builder: Bethlehem-Fairfield Shipyard, Baltimore, Maryland
- Cost: $1,056,089
- Yard number: 2028
- Way number: 3
- Laid down: 18 March 1942
- Launched: 22 May 1942
- Sponsored by: Mrs. J.F. McInnis
- Completed: 13 June 1942
- Identification: Call sign: KFOG
- Fate: Sold for commercial use, 26 March 1947

United States
- Name: Carolyn
- Owner: Baltimore Insular Line
- Operator: A.H. Bull & Co., Inc.
- Fate: Exchanged to Maritime Administration (MARAD), 29 August 1961

United States
- Name: Carolyn
- Owner: Maritime Administration
- Fate: Laid up in the Hudson River Reserve Fleet, Jones Point, New York, 15 October 1948; Sold for scrapping, 29 October 1962

General characteristics
- Class & type: Liberty ship; type EC2-S-C1, standard
- Tonnage: 10,865 LT DWT; 7,176 GRT
- Displacement: 3,380 long tons (3,434 t) (light); 14,245 long tons (14,474 t) (max)
- Length: 441 feet 6 inches (135 m) oa; 416 feet (127 m) pp; 427 feet (130 m) lwl
- Beam: 57 feet (17 m)
- Draft: 27 ft 9.25 in (8.4646 m)
- Installed power: 2 × Oil fired 450 °F (232 °C) boilers, operating at 220 psi (1,500 kPa); 2,500 hp (1,900 kW)
- Propulsion: 1 × triple-expansion steam engine, (manufactured by Worthington Pump & Machinery Corp, Harrison, New Jersey); 1 × screw propeller
- Speed: 11.5 knots (21.3 km/h; 13.2 mph)
- Capacity: 562,608 cubic feet (15,931 m^{3}) (grain); 499,573 cubic feet (14,146 m^{3}) (bale)
- Complement: 38–62 USMM; 21–40 USNAG
- Armament: Varied by ship; Bow-mounted 3-inch (76 mm)/50-caliber gun; Stern-mounted 4-inch (102 mm)/50-caliber gun; 2–8 × single 20-millimeter (0.79 in) Oerlikon anti-aircraft (AA) cannons and/or, 2–8 × 37-millimeter (1.46 in) M1 AA guns

SS Richard Bassett was a Liberty ship built in the United States during World War II. She was named after Founding Father Richard Bassett, a Delaware attorney and politician, veteran of the American Revolutionary War, delegate to the Constitutional Convention of 1787, signer of the United States Constitution, United States Senator from Delaware, Chief Justice of the Delaware Court of Common Pleas, Governor of Delaware and a United States circuit judge of the United States Circuit Court for the Third Circuit. He holds the overall seniority position of #1 in the history of the United States Senate.

== Construction ==
Richard Bassett was laid down on 18 March 1942, under a Maritime Commission (MARCOM) contract, MCE hull 41, by the Bethlehem-Fairfield Shipyard, Baltimore, Maryland; sponsored by Mrs. J.F. McInnis, the wife of the MARCOM Eastcoast Regional Director, and was launched on 22 May 1942.

== History ==
She was allocated to A. H. Bull Steamship Company, on 13 June 1942. On 26 March 1947, she was sold for commercial use to the Baltimore Insular Line, for $544,506. On 29 August 1961, she was used for an exchange with the Maritime Administration (MARAD). On 5 September 1961, she was laid up in the Hudson River Reserve Fleet, Jones Point, New York. She was sold for scrapping on 29 October 1962, to Union Minerals & Alloys Corp.

== Bibliography ==
- "Bethlehem-Fairfield, Baltimore MD". www.ShipbuildingHistory.com. 14 August 2008.
- Maritime Administration. "Richard Bassett". Ship History Database Vessel Status Card. U.S. Department of Transportation, Maritime Administration.
- Davies, James (May 2004). "Specifications (As-Built)" (PDF). p. 23.
- "SS Richard Bassett".
