= SS John J. Crittenden =

Liberty ship of WWII

History

United States
- Name: John J. Crittenden
- Namesake: John J. Crittenden
- Owner: War Shipping Administration (WSA)
- Operator: A.H. Bull & Co., Inc.
- Ordered: as type (EC2-S-C1) hull, MC hull 1196
- Builder: St. Johns River Shipbuilding Company, Jacksonville, Florida
- Cost: $2,314,420
- Yard number: 4
- Way number: 4
- Laid down: 15 October 1942
- Launched: 7 May 1943
- Sponsored by: Mrs. Earl D.Page
- Completed: 24 June 1943
- Identification: Call sign: KIUV
- Fate: Placed in National Defense Reserve Fleet, Wilmington, North Carolina, 10 July 1948; Sold for scrapping, 4 April 1968, withdrawn from fleet, 15 May 1968

General characteristics
- Class & type: Liberty ship; type EC2-S-C1, standard
- Tonnage: 10,865 LT DWT; 7,176 GRT
- Displacement: 3,380 long tons (3,434 t) (light); 14,245 long tons (14,474 t) (max)
- Length: 441 feet 6 inches (135 m) oa; 416 feet (127 m) pp; 427 feet (130 m) lwl
- Beam: 57 feet (17 m)
- Draft: 27 ft 9.25 in (8.4646 m)
- Installed power: 2 × Oil fired 450 °F (232 °C) boilers, operating at 220 psi (1,500 kPa); 2,500 hp (1,900 kW)
- Propulsion: 1 × triple-expansion steam engine, (manufactured by General Machinery Corp., Hamilton, Ohio); 1 × screw propeller
- Speed: 11.5 knots (21.3 km/h; 13.2 mph)
- Capacity: 562,608 cubic feet (15,931 m^{3}) (grain); 499,573 cubic feet (14,146 m^{3}) (bale)
- Complement: 38–62 USMM; 21–40 USNAG
- Armament: Varied by ship; Bow-mounted 3-inch (76 mm)/50-caliber gun; Stern-mounted 4-inch (102 mm)/50-caliber gun; 2–8 × single 20-millimeter (0.79 in) Oerlikon anti-aircraft (AA) cannons and/or, 2–8 × 37-millimeter (1.46 in) M1 AA guns

SS John J. Crittenden was a Liberty ship built in the United States during World War II. She was named after John J. Crittenden, an American politician from Kentucky. He represented the state in both the US House of Representatives and the US Senate and twice served as United States Attorney General in the administrations of William Henry Harrison, John Tyler, and Millard Fillmore. He was also the 17th governor of Kentucky and served in the state legislature.

== Construction ==
John J. Crittenden was laid down on 15 October 1942, under a Maritime Commission (MARCOM) contract, MC hull 1196, by the St. Johns River Shipbuilding Company, Jacksonville, Florida; she was sponsored by Mrs. Earl D. Page, the wife of the treasurer of the St. John's River SB Co., she was launched on 7 May 1943.

== History ==
She was allocated to A.H. Bull & Co., Inc., on 24 June 1943. On 10 July 1948, she was placed in the National Defense Reserve Fleet, Wilmington, North Carolina. She was sold for scrapping, on 4 April 1968, to Union Minerals and Alloys Corporation. She was delivered, 15 May 1968.

== Bibliography ==
- "St. John's River Shipbuilding, Jacksonville FL". www.ShipbuildingHistory.com. 16 October 2010.
- Maritime Administration. "John J. Crittenden". Ship History Database Vessel Status Card. U.S. Department of Transportation, Maritime Administration.
- Davies, James (May 2004). "Specifications (As-Built)" (PDF). p. 23.
- "SS John J. Crittenden".
