= SS Jean Ribaut =

World War II Liberty ship of the United States

History

United States
- Name: Jean Ribaut
- Namesake: Jean Ribaut
- Owner: War Shipping Administration (WSA)
- Operator: A.H. Bull & Co., Inc.
- Ordered: as type (EC2-S-C1) hull, MC hull 2300
- Builder: J.A. Jones Construction, Panama City, Florida
- Cost: $1,003,697
- Yard number: 41
- Way number: 2
- Laid down: 23 March 1944
- Launched: 5 May 1944
- Sponsored by: Miss Betty Jean Riley
- Completed: 29 May 1944
- Identification: Call Signal: KJVC
- Fate: Laid up in National Defense Reserve Fleet, James River Group, Lee Hall, Virginia, 17 November 1947; Laid up in National Defense Reserve Fleet, Hudson River Group, 22 April 1952; Sold for scrapping, 13 March 1970

General characteristics
- Class & type: Liberty ship; type EC2-S-C1, standard
- Tonnage: 10,865 LT DWT; 7,176 GRT
- Displacement: 3,380 long tons (3,434 t) (light); 14,245 long tons (14,474 t) (max)
- Length: 441 feet 6 inches (135 m) oa; 416 feet (127 m) pp; 427 feet (130 m) lwl
- Beam: 57 feet (17 m)
- Draft: 27 ft 9.25 in (8.4646 m)
- Installed power: 2 × Oil fired 450 °F (232 °C) boilers, operating at 220 psi (1,500 kPa); 2,500 hp (1,900 kW)
- Propulsion: 1 × triple-expansion steam engine, (manufactured by Iron Fireman Manufacturing Co., Portland, Oregon); 1 × screw propeller
- Speed: 11.5 knots (21.3 km/h; 13.2 mph)
- Capacity: 562,608 cubic feet (15,931 m^{3}) (grain); 499,573 cubic feet (14,146 m^{3}) (bale)
- Complement: 38–62 USMM; 21–40 USNAG
- Armament: Varied by ship; Bow-mounted 3-inch (76 mm)/50-caliber gun; Stern-mounted 4-inch (102 mm)/50-caliber gun; 2–8 × single 20-millimeter (0.79 in) Oerlikon anti-aircraft (AA) cannons and/or, 2–8 × 37-millimeter (1.46 in) M1 AA guns

SS Jean Ribaut was a Liberty ship built in the United States during World War II. She was named after Jean Ribaut, a French naval officer, navigator, and colonizer.

== Construction ==
Jean Ribaut was laid down on 23 March 1944, under a Maritime Commission (MARCOM) contract, MC hull 2300, by J.A. Jones Construction, Panama City, Florida; she was sponsored by Miss Betty Jean Riley, an honor student at Bay County High School, and launched on 5 May 1944.

== History ==
She was allocated to A.H. Bull & Co., Inc., on 29 May 1944. On 17 November 1947, she was laid up in the National Defense Reserve Fleet, in the James River Group. On 22 April 1952, she was relocated to the National Defense Reserve Fleet, in the Hudson River Group. On 18 August 1953, she was withdrawn from the fleet to be loaded with grain under the "Grain Program 1953". She returned loaded with grain to the fleet on 28 August 1953. On 10 May 1956, she was withdrawn from the fleet to have the grain unloaded. She returned to the fleet with a new load of grain on 1 June 1956. She was withdrawn from the fleet on 3 July 1957, to unload and returned empty on 8 July 1957. On 6 June 1958, she was withdrawn to be loaded with grain and returned on 20 June 1958. On 25 January 1960, she was removed for the last time to be unloaded, she returned empty on 3 February 1960. On 13 March 1970, she was sold for $41,212 to Union Minerals and Alloys Corporation, for scrapping. She was withdrawn from the fleet on 21 April 1970.

== Bibliography ==
- "Jones Construction, Panama City FL". www.ShipbuildingHistory.com. 13 October 2010.
- "Liberty Ships – World War II".
- Maritime Administration. "Jean Ribaut". Ship History Database Vessel Status Card. U.S. Department of Transportation, Maritime Administration. Archived from the original on 12 December 2019.
- Davies, James (May 2004). "Specifications (As-Built)" (PDF). p. 23.
- "SS Jean Ribaut".
