= SS William Johnson =

Liberty ship of WWII

History

United States
- Name: William Johnson
- Namesake: William Johnson
- Owner: War Shipping Administration (WSA)
- Operator: A.H. Bull & Co., Inc.
- Ordered: as type (EC2-S-C1) hull, MCE hull 40
- Awarded: 14 March 1941
- Builder: Bethlehem-Fairfield Shipyard, Baltimore, Maryland
- Cost: $1,056,310
- Yard number: 2027
- Way number: 12
- Laid down: 18 March 1942
- Launched: 22 May 1942
- Sponsored by: Miss Irene Long
- Completed: 16 June 1942
- Identification: Call sign: KFUW
- Fate: Laid up in the Hudson River Reserve Fleet, Jones Point, New York, 15 October 1948; Laid up in the National Defense Reserve Fleet, Mobile, Alabama, 27 July 1949; Sold for scrapping, 8 May 1961

General characteristics
- Class & type: Liberty ship; type EC2-S-C1, standard
- Tonnage: 10,865 LT DWT; 7,176 GRT
- Displacement: 3,380 long tons (3,434 t) (light); 14,245 long tons (14,474 t) (max)
- Length: 441 feet 6 inches (135 m) oa; 416 feet (127 m) pp; 427 feet (130 m) lwl
- Beam: 57 feet (17 m)
- Draft: 27 ft 9.25 in (8.4646 m)
- Installed power: 2 × Oil fired 450 °F (232 °C) boilers, operating at 220 psi (1,500 kPa); 2,500 hp (1,900 kW)
- Propulsion: 1 × triple-expansion steam engine, (manufactured by General Machinery Corp., Hamilton, Ohio); 1 × screw propeller
- Speed: 11.5 knots (21.3 km/h; 13.2 mph)
- Capacity: 562,608 cubic feet (15,931 m^{3}) (grain); 499,573 cubic feet (14,146 m^{3}) (bale)
- Complement: 38–62 USMM; 21–40 USNAG
- Armament: Varied by ship; Bow-mounted 3-inch (76 mm)/50-caliber gun; Stern-mounted 4-inch (102 mm)/50-caliber gun; 2–8 × single 20-millimeter (0.79 in) Oerlikon anti-aircraft (AA) cannons and/or, 2–8 × 37-millimeter (1.46 in) M1 AA guns

SS William Johnson was a Liberty ship built in the United States during World War II. She was named after William Johnson, a state legislator and judge in South Carolina, and an associate justice of the United States Supreme Court from 1804 to his death in 1834.

== Construction ==
William Johnson was laid down on 18 March 1942, under a Maritime Commission (MARCOM) contract, MCE hull 38, by the Bethlehem-Fairfield Shipyard, Baltimore, Maryland; sponsored by Miss Irene Long, the secretary to Vice Admiral Howard L. Vickery, and was launched on 22 May 1942.

== History ==
She was allocated to A.H. Bull & Co., Inc., on 16 June 1942. On 15 October 1948, she was laid up in the Hudson River Reserve Fleet, Jones Point, New York. On 27 July 1949, she was laid up in the National Defense Reserve Fleet, Mobile, Alabama. She was sold for scrapping on 8 May 1961, to Union Minerals & Alloys Corp.

== Bibliography ==
- "Bethlehem-Fairfield, Baltimore MD". www.ShipbuildingHistory.com. 14 August 2008.
- Maritime Administration. "William Johnson". Ship History Database Vessel Status Card. U.S. Department of Transportation, Maritime Administration.
- Davies, James (May 2004). "Specifications (As-Built)" (PDF). p. 23.
- "SS William Johnson".
