= SS William MacLay =

Liberty ship of WWII

History

United States
- Name: William MacLay
- Namesake: William MacLay
- Owner: War Shipping Administration (WSA)
- Operator: A.H. Bull & Co., Inc.
- Ordered: as type (EC2-S-C1) hull, MCE hull 47
- Awarded: 14 March 1941
- Builder: Bethlehem-Fairfield Shipyard, Baltimore, Maryland
- Cost: $1,054.457
- Yard number: 2034
- Way number: 1
- Laid down: 24 April 1942
- Launched: 22 June 1942
- Sponsored by: Mrs.John W. Whiling
- Completed: 7 July 1942
- Identification: Call sign: KFVA
- Fate: Laid up in the National Defense Reserve Fleet, Mobile, Alabama, 10 December 1947; Sold for scrapping, 26 April 1967, withdrawn from fleet, 18 May 1967

General characteristics
- Class & type: Liberty ship; type EC2-S-C1, standard
- Tonnage: 10,865 LT DWT; 7,176 GRT
- Displacement: 3,380 long tons (3,434 t) (light); 14,245 long tons (14,474 t) (max)
- Length: 441 feet 6 inches (135 m) oa; 416 feet (127 m) pp; 427 feet (130 m) lwl
- Beam: 57 feet (17 m)
- Draft: 27 ft 9.25 in (8.4646 m)
- Installed power: 2 × Oil fired 450 °F (232 °C) boilers, operating at 220 psi (1,500 kPa); 2,500 hp (1,900 kW)
- Propulsion: 1 × triple-expansion steam engine, (manufactured by Vulcan Iron Works, Wilkes-Barre, Pennsylvania); 1 × screw propeller
- Speed: 11.5 knots (21.3 km/h; 13.2 mph)
- Capacity: 562,608 cubic feet (15,931 m^{3}) (grain); 499,573 cubic feet (14,146 m^{3}) (bale)
- Complement: 38–62 USMM; 21–40 USNAG
- Armament: Varied by ship; Bow-mounted 3-inch (76 mm)/50-caliber gun; Stern-mounted 4-inch (102 mm)/50-caliber gun; 2–8 × single 20-millimeter (0.79 in) Oerlikon anti-aircraft (AA) cannons and/or, 2–8 × 37-millimeter (1.46 in) M1 AA guns

SS William MacLay was a Liberty ship built in the United States during World War II. She was named after William MacLay, a politician from Pennsylvania during the eighteenth century. Maclay, along with Robert Morris, was a member of Pennsylvania's first two-member delegation to the United States Senate. Following his tenure in the Senate, he served in the Pennsylvania House of Representatives on two separate occasions, as a county judge, and as a presidential elector.

== Construction ==
William MacLay was laid down on 24 April 1942, under a Maritime Commission (MARCOM) contract, MCE hull 47, by the Bethlehem-Fairfield Shipyard, Baltimore, Maryland; sponsored by Mrs. John W. Whiling, the wife local ABS surveyor at Bethlehem-Fairfield Shipyard, and was launched on 22 June 1942.

== History ==
She was allocated to A.H. Bull & Co., Inc., on 7 July 1942. On 10 December 1947, she was laid up in the National Defense Reserve Fleet, Mobile, Alabama. She was sold for scrapping on 26 April 1967, to Union Minerals & Alloys Corp., for $45,501. She was withdrawn from the fleet on 18 May 1967.

== Bibliography ==
- "Bethlehem-Fairfield, Baltimore MD". www.ShipbuildingHistory.com. 14 August 2008.
- Maritime Administration. "William MacLay". Ship History Database Vessel Status Card. U.S. Department of Transportation, Maritime Administration.
- Davies, James (May 2004). "Specifications (As-Built)" (PDF). p. 23.
- "SS William MacLay".
