= SS Lord Baltimore =

Coastal passenger and cargo steamship

History
- Name: Lord Baltimore
- Namesake: Lord Baltimore
- Owner: Ericsson Line
- Port of registry: (United States) Philadelphia
- Route: Baltimore to Philadelphia
- Builder: Harlan and Hollingsworth, Wilmington, Delaware
- Cost: $125,000 ($3,493,320 in 2024)
- Launched: May 27, 1903
- Maiden voyage: August 16, 1903

General characteristics
- Displacement: 615 tons
- Length: 203 ft (62 m)
- Beam: 24 ft (7.3 m)
- Draught: 9 ft (2.7 m)
- Speed: Service: 19 mph (17 kn)
- Capacity: 800–1,000 passengers

SS Lord Baltimore was a coastal passenger steamship built in 1903 for the American shipping company Ericsson Line by Harlan and Hollingsworth in Wilmington, Delaware. The ship operated a day service between Baltimore and Philadelphia. The intended route used the Chesapeake and Delaware Canal for an inland passage using Chesapeake Bay, Delaware Bay and the Delaware River.

== Construction ==
In late 1902, the Baltimore and Philadelphia Steamboat Company, the parent company of the Ericsson Line placed an order to Harlan and Hollingsworth ship builders for two new steamships. The new ships were to replace the aging SS Richard Willing, and SS General Cadwallader, which both had a maximum capacity of 500 passengers.

The Lord Baltimore's engines were four-cylinder, triple-expansion type of 2,000 indicated horsepower (1,500 kW), with cylinders of 21-inch (530 mm), 32-inch (810 mm), and 35-inch (890 mm) diameters. There were no auxiliary engines. The condenser was of the independent type. Steam was supplied by four water, Almy built tubular boilers, having a grate surface of 224 square feet (20.8 m^{2}) and a medium force draft. There were two firerooms, with a coalbunker space between them the entire width of the boat.

The ship could accommodate up to 1,000 passengers. She had ten staterooms. Located forward on the saloon deck, she had a dining room which could seat 100 passengers at one time. There was a first-class smoking room, and a bar on the main deck for men. Officers' quarters were located on the flying deck aft of the pilot house, and crews' quarters were located forward on the main deck.

On August 11, 1903, Lord Baltimore started its sea trials in the Delaware River, being delivered to its owners in Philadelphia. On August 13, as part of its trials, the ship sailed to Baltimore for the first time. Its maiden sailing departed from Baltimore to its home port on Sunday, August 16.

== Service history ==
After only sailing for less than a year, on July 31, 1904, the propeller of Lord Baltimore was reportedly damaged en route to Philadelphia, resulting in the ship being towed back to Baltimore. The following day, the ship was dry docked, where it was revealed the propeller became displaced and needed to be adjusted.

In early 1905, the ship was overhauled in Philadelphia. That summer, the ship was chartered by the Universalist Church for their sixth annual pilgrimage to the ruins of Maryland's oldest Universalist Church in Chesapeake City, Maryland. In December 1905, the ship was berthed at Long Dock, and its boilers were connected to the Pratt Street Power Plant. Baltimore's power grid was struggling to supply enough electricity to meet the demands of the city, and Lord Baltimore was contracted to help handle the load. After being chartered to furnish steam to the power plant, the ship was laid up for cleaning and overhauling. But after the steamship Richard Willing experienced trouble, Lord Baltimore had to be hastily sent out while the other ship was under repair.

Navigating the tight channels of a river were difficult, and on September 3, 1907, Lord Baltimore collided with the fishing schooner Annie Godfrey.

While the ship was docked in Baltimore at the Pratt street berth on August 24, 1908, Chief Engineer Charles W. Wright and Mr. Irving Wolf heard cries of distress coming from the water. Both men dove overboard to assist Mrs. Wilhelmina Ahtes who had been intentionally pushed into the harbor. Mrs. Ahtes' 7-year-old daughter, Helen Ahtes, was scheduled to testify in court the following day. When pulled from the water, Mrs. Ahtes muttered, "they told me I would never get my child back."

During a wargame played in September 1909 by the First Company of the Maryland Coast Artillery, Lord Baltimore served as a stand-in for a Armored cruiser. As she passed Fort Howard she was labeled an "enemy" ship and was theoretically sunk.

In December 1909, and January 1910, Lord Baltimore and her sister ship Penn were being used as icebreakers. On the night of February 9, 1910, while sailing through the fog and ice, Lord Baltimore ran aground on Pooles Island. At the time of the incident, there were no passengers on board, only freight. The iceboat Latrobe was sent on February 11, to attempt to dislodge Lord Baltimore while at high tide. With the added assistance of the Annapolis, the ship was pulled free and refloated on February 12. Following the grounding, the ship was "extensively repaired," by Skinner Shipbuilding and Dry Dock Company.

On July 14, 1912, Ericsson ran aground on a sand bar near Pooles Island. It departed Betterton at 8 PM and was expected to arrive in Baltimore around 11 PM. After it failed to arrive, Ericsson Line offices were besieged by anxious relatives of those on board, and around 3 AM, an agent for the Ericsson Line ordered Lord Baltimore to search for the missing ship. Around 5:20 AM, Lord Baltimore departed on its assignment and Ericsson was located sometime after 6 AM.

In September 1913, Lord Baltimore was in the process of undergoing repairs, when her sister ship Penn caught fire while docked at Philadelphia. The fire started in the galley around 5:15 AM on Saturday, September 6, 1913. Captain Alexander McNamee and 31 members of the crew escaped without fatality. When the fire was deemed in danger of spreading to the Ericsson Pier, the ship was cast loose into the harbor. The water sprayed in to extinguish the fire, caused the ship to sink in the harbor in about 24 feet (7.3 m) of water. Only the stern sank completely, leaving the scorched shell of the bow to continue poking out of the water. With Lord Baltimore out of commission, the Ericsson Baltimore to Philadelphia service ended early for the season. Penn was successfully refloated on October 31, 1913.

En route to Philadelphia and passing Pooles Island, on Thursday, July 8, 1915, a boiler tube exploded in Lord Baltimore's hold. A fireman on the ship was drenched with steam and boiling water, and had to be passed to the Tolchester Line's Susquehanna which was headed to Baltimore.

On April 8, 1919, the Claiborne–Annapolis Ferry Company led by Charles W. Harrison, chartered both Penn and Lord Baltimore for a period of four months officially starting May 15, 1919. The Washington-Southern Navigation Company was created to run them, with the intention of having them operate between Washington and Richmond. One of the stipulations of the contract stipulated that Clairborne-Annapolis Ferry Company was responsible for all expenses attending to the operation of the steamers, and that they had an option to purchase the steamers of exercised within 90 days.

On May 30, after leaving Colonial Beach, Virginia Lord Baltimore became disabled as a result of engine trouble. The ship, and the 340 passengers aboard had to be rescued by two United States Navy tugboats. By July, both ships were pulled from the new route, with the company saying, "the boats were not stanch enough to stand the strain of heavy traffic."

In 1921, a lawsuit was brought forth in regard to a lien placed on the ship for non-payment of coal while it was chartered by the Washington-Southern Navigation Company.

On September 1, 1920, Lord Baltimore and Penn were towed by Senator Penrose to St. George, Delaware, where they were tied up in a back channel allegedly because their summer seasons were over. Allegedly, the ships were tied up because their passenger capacity was slashed by government inspectors. It was reported the following year, they were actually tied up because they were, "condemned as unfit and unsafe for use." Ericsson Line announced plans to remodel both ships completely, in addition to replacing the coal powered engines with an oil-burning system.

Both ships were successfully renovated, and expected to re-enter service between Philadelphia and Baltimore by June 1921.

Lord Baltimore was serviced at Jackson and Sharp Shipyard and had wooden sponsons attached to the steel hull to cut down on rolling in rough weather. Government experts examined the ship, and she was, "licensed to carry 700 passengers, instead of 300 heretofore."

The return to the Philadelphia to Baltimore route proved successful, and in June 1924, Ericsson Line asked for bids to build two new ships. Later that year, the Lord Baltimore flew its flag at half mast in honor of the death of Ericsson Line manager W. S. Dowdy. By 1925, Ericsson Line still had not finalized construction on new ships, due in part to the uncertainty of Chesapeake & Delaware Canal having been bought by federal government with plans to renovate the canal.

On a Sunday, August 8, 1926, voyage, between Baltimore and Betterton Beach, one of the funnels on the ship overheated igniting a small blaze of woodwork on the second deck. It was quickly extinguished before it could spread, and no injuries' were reported.

It was decided to renovate the Chesapeake & Delaware Canal from a lock based system to a sea-level route, this change affected the tides around Chesapeake City. On Wednesday, March 2, 1927, the Lord Baltimore loaded with passengers and freight ran aground on the banks of the canal as a result of the strong tides. The force of the tide twisted the ship at an angle, driving it into the embankment. Unable to extricate itself, the canal was blocked for half-an-hour until Lord Baltimore could be pulled free.
