= USS Ice King =

Cargo ship of the United States Navy

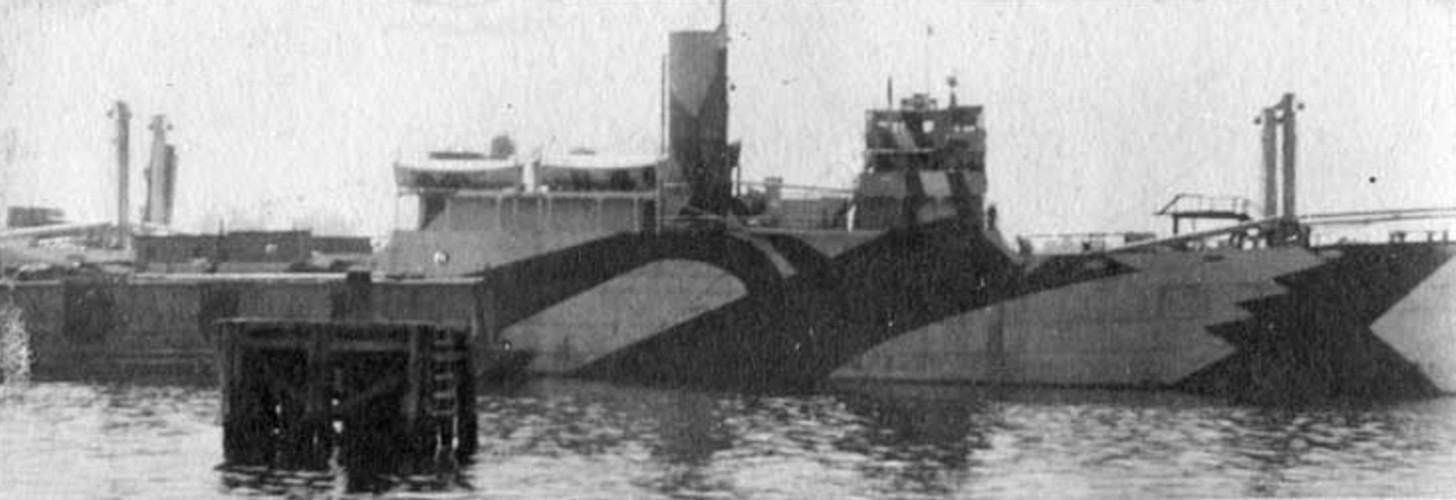
- USS Ice King (ID # 3160), a refrigerated cargo ship wearing pattern camouflage, probably photographed around 19 June 1918

History

United States
- Name: USS Ice King
- Namesake: Name Passaic changed to Ice King to prevent confusion
- Owner: Cunard Steamship Company
- Builder: Standard Shipbuilding Company, Shooters Island, New York
- Laid down: date unknown
- Launched: as War Unit 22 December 1917
- Christened: as War Unit; renamed Passaic while under construction
- Completed: 1918
- Acquired: by Navy 2 July 1918
- Commissioned: as USS Ice King 5 July 1918 at Brooklyn, New York
- Decommissioned: 26 May 1919
- Maiden voyage: Nova Scotia on 18 July 1918 to Bordeaux, France, on 5 August
- Renamed: renamed Ice King shortly before commissioning
- Stricken: circa 26 May 1919
- Fate: Returned to the U.S. Shipping Board for service until laid up in 1923; scrapped in 1950 at Wilmington, Delaware
- Notes: Subsequently entered merchant service as Georgian and later as Hilton, for A. H. Bull Lines

General characteristics
- Type: refrigerated cargo ship
- Tonnage: 4,715 gross tons
- Displacement: 10,562 tons
- Length: 392 ft 6 in (119.63 m)
- Beam: 52 ft (16 m)
- Draft: 23 ft 8 in (7.21 m)
- Propulsion: not known
- Speed: 10 knots
- Complement: 86 officers and enlisted
- Armament: one 3-inch gun mount; one 5-inch gun mount

USS Ice King (ID 3160) was a refrigerated cargo ship (reefer ship) acquired by the U.S. Navy during World War I. She was assigned to transport cargo across the Atlantic Ocean to Allied troops in Europe. On her first transatlantic crossing, a German submarine fired torpedoes at her, but, through skillful maneuvering, her captain was able to avoid being struck and sunk. Post-war she was sold, and continued her civilian maritime career.

== Requisitioned by the Navy ==
Ice King, a 4715 gross ton (10,562 tons displacement) refrigerated cargo ship, was built at Shooters Island, New York, as part of the World War I shipbuilding effort. Ordered by the British as War Unit, she was requisitioned by the U.S. Shipping Board and renamed Passaic while under construction. The ship was taken over by the Navy at New York City on 2 July and commissioned on 5 July 1918.

She carried the name Passaic in 1918 but was renamed Ice King shortly before commissioning, probably by the Navy to avoid confusion with a tug named Passaic (later designated YT-20) that was already on the Navy List.

== World War I service ==
=== Dodging U-Boat torpedoes ===
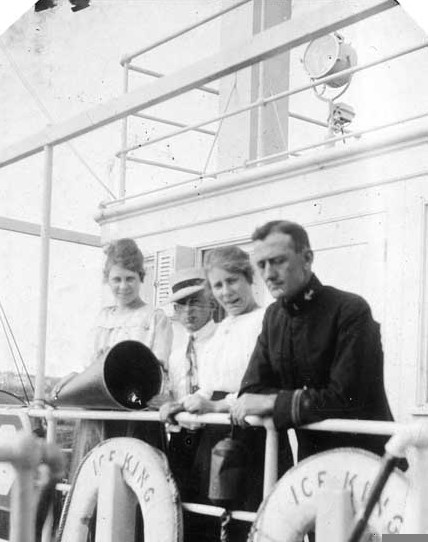
Passengers and a junior naval officer standing at a railing at the rear of the ship's pilot house circa August–September 1919.

USS Ice King departed Halifax, Nova Scotia on 18 July 1918 and arrived at Bordeaux, France, on 5 August with a cargo of over 2,500 tons of frozen beef, 200 tons of general cargo, and 20 trucks. While en route from Brest to Quiberon Bay 3 August, the ship maneuvered clear of two torpedoes from a German U-boat and then proceeded safely to her destination.

=== Transatlantic crossings ===
Between September 1918 and May 1919 Ice King made four more round trip voyages between the United States and France, loading up to 3,000 tons frozen beef at Hoboken, New Jersey, for the eastbound voyage and returning with smaller U.S. Army return cargoes, including ammunition. Ice King was twice delayed in French ports, once by a shortage of refrigerated railcars and once by port congestion.

== Post-war decommissioning ==
USS Ice King was decommissioned and returned to the Shipping Board at New York City on 26 May 1919.

== Subsequent maritime career ==
As S.S. Ice King, the ship began commercial service later in 1919 while owned by the Shipping Board, with port calls including Hook of Holland in August and Goteborg, Sweden in September 1919. In 1920 the Shipping Board transferred her to the French American Line of New York, but this arrangement was short lived.

Before the end of the year she was back in Shipping Board hands, where she remained until she was sold and renamed Georgian in 1928. Renamed Hilton in 1936, she was finally scrapped at Wilmington, Delaware, in 1951.
