= SS Thomas Ruffin =

Liberty ship of WWII

History

United States
- Name: Thomas Ruffin
- Namesake: Thomas Ruffin
- Owner: War Shipping Administration (WSA)
- Operator: A.H. Bull & Co., Inc.
- Ordered: as type (EC2-S-C1) hull, MCE hull 39
- Awarded: 14 March 1941
- Builder: Bethlehem-Fairfield Shipyard, Baltimore, Maryland
- Cost: $1,065,146
- Yard number: 2026
- Way number: 5
- Laid down: 9 March 1942
- Launched: 18 May 1942
- Sponsored by: Mrs. Joseph F. Johnson
- Completed: 10 June 1942
- Identification: Call sign: KFRL
- Fate: Damaged by German submarine U-510, 9 March 1943; Sold for scrapping, 18 April 1947

General characteristics
- Class & type: Liberty ship; type EC2-S-C1, standard
- Tonnage: 10,865 LT DWT; 7,176 GRT
- Displacement: 3,380 long tons (3,434 t) (light); 14,245 long tons (14,474 t) (max)
- Length: 441 feet 6 inches (135 m) oa; 416 feet (127 m) pp; 427 feet (130 m) lwl
- Beam: 57 feet (17 m)
- Draft: 27 ft 9.25 in (8.4646 m)
- Installed power: 2 × Oil fired 450 °F (232 °C) boilers, operating at 220 psi (1,500 kPa); 2,500 hp (1,900 kW)
- Propulsion: 1 × triple-expansion steam engine, (manufactured by Clark Bros. Co., Cleveland, Ohio); 1 × screw propeller
- Speed: 11.5 knots (21.3 km/h; 13.2 mph)
- Capacity: 562,608 cubic feet (15,931 m^{3}) (grain); 499,573 cubic feet (14,146 m^{3}) (bale)
- Complement: 38–62 USMM; 21–40 USNAG
- Armament: Varied by ship; Bow-mounted 3-inch (76 mm)/50-caliber gun; Stern-mounted 4-inch (102 mm)/50-caliber gun; 2–8 × single 20-millimeter (0.79 in) Oerlikon anti-aircraft (AA) cannons and/or, 2–8 × 37-millimeter (1.46 in) M1 AA guns

SS Thomas Ruffin was a Liberty ship built in the United States during World War II. She was named after Thomas Ruffin, an American jurist and Justice of the North Carolina Supreme Court from 1829 to 1852 and again from 1858 to 1859. He was Chief Justice of that Court from 1833 to 1852.

== Construction ==
Thomas Ruffin was laid down on 9 March 1942, under a Maritime Commission (MARCOM) contract, MCE hull 39, by the Bethlehem-Fairfield Shipyard, Baltimore, Maryland; she was sponsored by Mrs. Joseph F. Johnson, the wife of the MARCOM senior hull inspector at the Bethlehem-Fairfield Shipyard, and was launched on 18 May 1942.

== History ==
She was allocated to A.H. Bull & Co., Inc., on 6 June 1942.

=== Attack ===
Thomas Ruffin left Bahia, Brazil, on 28 February 1943, loaded only with water ballast, as part of Convoy BT-6, for Trinidad. In the early morning of 9 March, German submarine U-510 fired on the convoy about 175 mi (282 km), at 7°40′N 52°7′W, north of Cayenne, French Guiana. Thomas Ruffin was struck in the engine room by one torpedo on her port side. In the explosion the shaft and engine were destroyed and three crewmen killed. The explosion also ruptured steam lines and the fuel tanks along with disabling the radio and causing the ship to take on a list to starboard. The crew of eight officers, 35 crewmen, and 15 Armed guard were able to abandon the ship in two lifeboats and two rafts. The commander of the Armed guard, with one crewman, remained behind and were rejoined by the captain and one crewman at daylight. Courage picked up 40 of the survivors.

== Disposition ==
HMS Milford took Thomas Ruffin in tow, arriving at the naval dock in Port of Spain, on 17 March, where repairs were made so she could be towed to Mobile, Alabama. She was declared a Constructive Total Loss and laid up to be used as a training ship 2 September 1943.

On 31 August 1945, she was laid up in the National Defense Reserve Fleet, in Mobile. She was sold for scrapping on 25 March 1947, to Pinto Island Metals Co., for $18,200. She was withdrawn from the fleet on 18 April 1947.

== Bibliography ==
- "Bethlehem-Fairfield, Baltimore MD". www.ShipbuildingHistory.com. 14 August 2008.
- Maritime Administration. "Thomas Ruffin". Ship History Database Vessel Status Card. U.S. Department of Transportation, Maritime Administration.
- Davies, James (May 2004). "Specifications (As-Built)" (PDF). p. 23.
- "SS Thomas Ruffin".
- "Thomas Ruffin".
