= SS John Cadwalader =

Coastal passenger and cargo steamship

History
- Name: John Cadwalader
- Owner: Baltimore-Philadelphia Steamship Co. (1926—1935); Ericsson Line (1935—1942); British Ministry of War Transport (1942)
- Port of registry: (United States) Baltimore (1926-42); United Kingdom (1942)
- Route: Baltimore—Philadelphia inland route
- Builder: Pusey & Jones, Wilmington, Delaware
- Cost: $395,966.81
- Yard number: 394, Contract number: 1030
- Laid down: 11 November 1925
- Launched: 27 March 1926
- Completed: 12 October 1926 (delivered to owner)
- In service: 12 October 1926
- Out of service: 29 August 1942
- Identification: U.S. Official Number: 226007
- Fate: Burned at pier 29 August 1942

General characteristics
- Tonnage: 1,478 GRT, 805 net, 700 DWT
- Length: 230 ft (70.1 m) LOA; 219 ft 2 in (66.8 m) registry
- Beam: 43 ft 6 in (13.3 m)
- Draft: 11 ft (3.4 m) loaded
- Depth: 14 ft 8 in (4.5 m)
- Installed power: 2 water tube boilers
- Propulsion: 1 triple expansion steam engine, single screw
- Speed: 15.2 kn (17.5 mph; 28.2 km/h)
- Capacity: 275 overnight passengers; 12,000 cubic feet (339.8 m^{3}) in holds (Note: The ship was converted in 1936 to cargo only with the significant capacity on the main deck. The hold capacity given post conversion was likely not significantly different from pre-conversion.)
- Crew: 40

SS John Cadwalader was a coastal passenger and cargo steamer launched in March 1926 by Pusey & Jones Corporation, Wilmington, Delaware for the Baltimore-Philadelphia Steamship Company for operation on overnight service between Baltimore and Philadelphia. The intended route used the Chesapeake and Delaware Canal for an inland passage using Chesapeake Bay, Delaware Bay and the Delaware River.

In 1935 the company's financial difficulty resulted in sale of the vessel to Ericsson Line, Inc., by the bank that foreclosed a mortgage on the ship. Ericsson operated the ship for about a year before converting operations to freight only. The ship was designed specifically for passenger and freight operations in inland waters and was limited in being adapted for other nautical purposes. Increasing truck transportation on the route had an effect on vessels in the trade. In November 1941 John Cadwalader was laid up in Philadelphia.

In July 1942, the War Shipping Administration (WSA) requisitioned the ship and immediately transferred it to the British Ministry of War Transport (BMWT) under Lend-Lease. The ship was loading for its initial Atlantic crossing in a convoy to be composed of antiquated river and coastal vessels, possibly intended for use as accommodation and hospital vessels, when it burned at the pier in Philadelphia on the morning of 29 August 1942. The hulk was salvaged by the Philadelphia Derrick and Salvage Corporation and eventually sold in February 1944.

== Construction ==
The ship was Pusey and Jones Corporation hull number 394, contract 1030, (Note: Hull and contract numbers are distinctly used in Company descriptions but appear to be confused and intermixed in external use.) with keel laid 11 November 1925 for the Baltimore-Philadelphia Steamship Company as a passenger and cargo vessel intended for operation on overnight, inland passage service between Baltimore and Philadelphia using Chesapeake Bay, the Chesapeake and Delaware Canal and Delaware Bay. The ship was launched as John Cadwalader on 27 March 1926 and delivered to the owner 12 October 1926.

John Cadwalader, U.S. Official Number 226007 with home port of Baltimore, had a steel hull, divided by six watertight bulkheads, that extended to the main deck topped by a wooden superstructure. The vessel, with a registered crew size of 40, was licensed to carry 275 overnight passengers. Accommodations were 85 staterooms and 158 berths. Overnight passenger capacity was defined as 168 first cabin, 6 second cabin, and 101 deck or steerage passengers. The aft portion of the main deck had a social and dining hall for passenger use. The vessel was also licensed to operate in rivers and between 15 April and 15 November in inshore waters with 1,005 day passengers.

The ship was 1,478 GRT, 805 net and about 700 DWT tons. Dimensions were 230 ft (70.1 m) length overall, 219 ft 2 in (66.8 m) registered length, beam of 45 ft (13.7 m), 43 ft 6 in (13.3 m) registered beam, registered depth of 14 ft 8 in (4.5 m) with loaded draft of 11 ft (3.4 m). Two oil fired boilers provided steam for a triple expansion engine, which was provided to the builder by the owner, driving a single screw for a speed of 15.2 kn (17.5 mph; 28.2 km/h). Large side ports allowed cargo to be loaded directly from piers and placed in the holds without use of lifting gear, though there was a cargo elevator between the hold and main deck. Cargo capacities when requisitioned in 1942, after becoming a cargo only vessel, was 44,800 cubic feet (1,268.6 m^{3}) on the main deck and 12,000 cubic feet (339.8 m^{3}) in holds for a total of 56,800 cubic feet (1,608.4 m^{3}). Evaluations made by government agents on requisition in 1942 noted the vessel was narrow and top heavy making it unsuitable for operation outside sheltered waters. (Note: The Chesapeake and Delaware Canal operation included in the design limited draft and beam.)

== Operation ==
John Cadwalader was operated by the Baltimore-Philadelphia Steamship Company in overnight passenger and freight service between Baltimore and Philadelphia from 1926 to 1931. In 1931 Ericsson Line was organized to take over ship operations of both the Baltimore-Philadelphia Steamship Company and the A. H. Bull Steamship Company. Ericsson operated the vessel for the company until financial difficulties in 1935 caused a foreclosure on the mortgage of John Cadwalader by the Philadelphia National Bank. Ericsson Line purchased the ship at auction for $55,000 and operated it as before until late 1936. The ship's passenger service was discontinued, partly due to regulations requiring fire safety, and operations were confined to freight only. Between 1938 and 1939 the passenger areas of the main deck were altered for freight by removal of bulkheads, dividers and furnishings. The passenger accommodations elsewhere were unchanged when the ship was laid up in Philadelphia 15 November 1941 due to increased competition from trucking and war time conditions.

On 22 July 1942 the ship was requisitioned for war use under the War Shipping Administration and designated for transfer to the British Ministry of War Transport under Lend-Lease. In a survey conducted the next day the vessel was found to be in suitable condition for operation on inland waters. Formal transfer was made effective by Requisition Number BSC 13,000 dated 6 August 1942 transferring eleven vessels under bareboat charter.

John Cadwalader was destined to join other antiquated river and coastal vessels in a convoy designated RB-1 (Note: The convoy included some well known ships and one ship, President Warfield, that was to become famous as Exodus. The convoy's story is told in The Decoys: A Tale of Three Atlantic Convoys, 1942, Chapter One, "Operation Maniac". Three of the ships and an escort (HMS Veteran) were lost in a Wolfpack attack on the convoy.) but burned at the pier in Philadelphia 29 August 1942 while loading. Coast Guard fireboats quickly responded but the fire spread very quickly throughout the wooden superstructure. After seven hours the fire was extinguished but the ship was nearly a total loss. One of the crew from Liverpool was detained but no sabotage occurred. The Philadelphia Derrick and Salvage Corporation salvaged the hulk and it was sold to R. W. Gatewood 5 February 1944.
