= A. H. Bull Steamship Company =

American passengers and shipping company

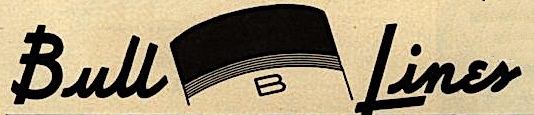
- Type: Privately held company
- Industry: Shipping, transportation, passenger liners
- Founded: 1902 in New York, United States
- Defunct: 1964
- Area served: Atlantic Ocean shores
- Key people: Archibald Hilton Bull; Ernest Miller Bull; Edward Mryon Bull

A. H. Bull Steamship Company was a shipping company and passenger liner service founded in New York City in 1902 by Archibald H. Bull (1848–1920). Service started with shipping between New York and Florida. His fleet of ships then added service to other Eastcoast ports. The company is also often called the Bull Lines and the Bull Steamship Line or A. H. Bull & Company. While founded in New York, Bull soon move its headquarter to Pier 5 in Baltimore, Maryland. Bull Lines main east coast ports were: Baltimore, Charleston, Philadelphia, Tampa and Norfolk, Virginia. Oversea ports: Porto Rico, Antwerp, Bordeaux, Hamburg, Bremen, Copenhagen, and West Africa. Bull Steamship Line supported the US war effort for both World War I and World War II, including the loss of ships.

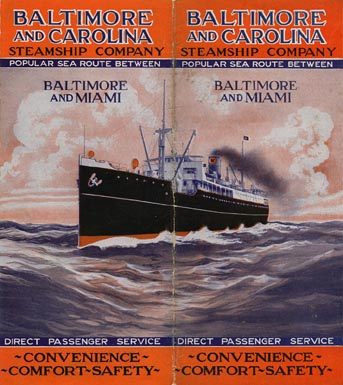
Baltimore Carolina Steamship Company, subsidiary of Bull Lines, timetable from 1924

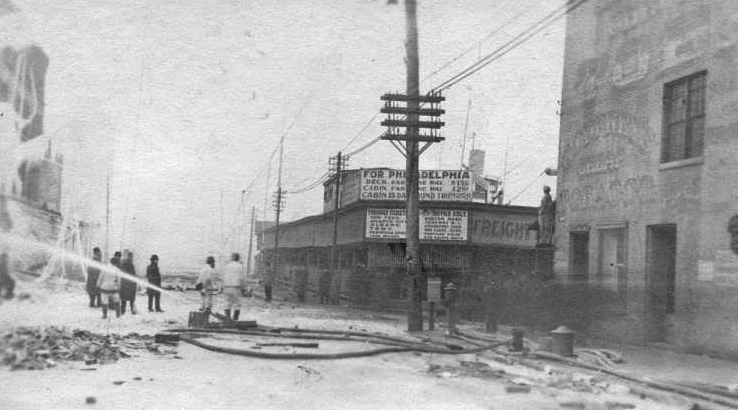
Baltimore and Philadelphia Steamboat Company Building, subsidiary of Bull Lines in 1904, at Pratt and Light Streets Baltimore, MD. Steamboat Company Building was not damaged by the fire nearby.

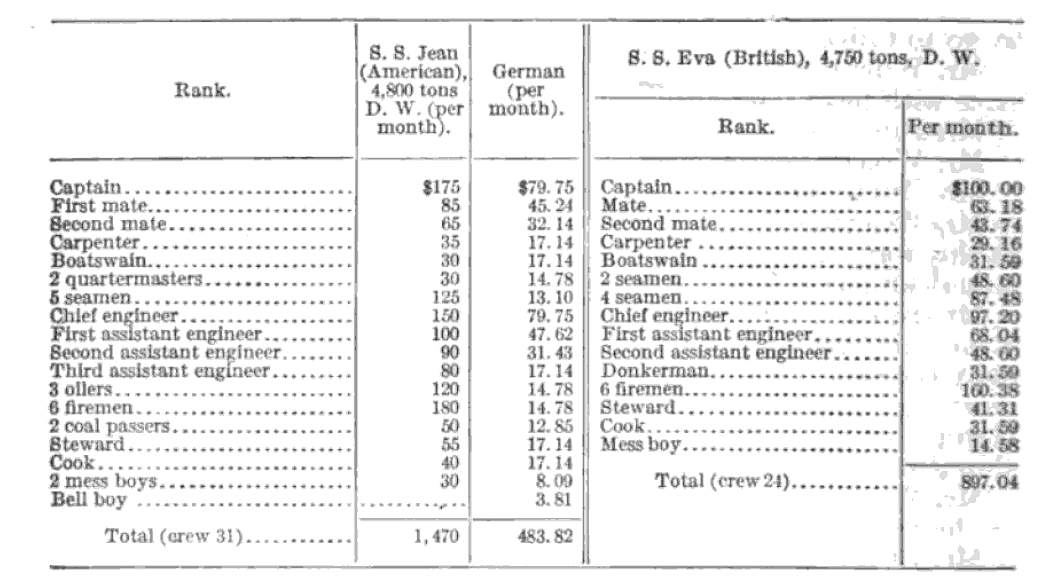
Crew and pay rate chart of Bull Line cargo ships Eva and Jean in 1911

== Archibald H. Bull ==
Archibald Hilton Bull (1847–1920) started in the shipping business at a very young age, he worked his way from an errand boy to be on the board of directors and president of companies. In 1885 Archibald H. Bull founded the British-flagged New York and Porto Rico Steamship Company, which operated the Porto Rico Line. He ran the firm as a British-flagged ship, as he found the operating cost much lower than US-flagged shipping. In 1895 Bull entered into a partnership with Juan Ceballos. The Porto Rico Line lines ran from New York to Red Hook's Atlantic Basin's Pier 35 to Puerto Rico. The Porto Rico Line was a cargo and tourists line, also Puerto Ricans migrated to New York's Red Hook, Brooklyn on the line. The Porto Rico Line was Bull's second company serving Porto Rico, his first company was started in 1873, using a small fleet of sailing packets boats. In 1900, his share in the company was bought by his partners in a hostile takeover. As part of the agreement Bull had to agree not to run steamers to Puerto Rico for 10 years, till 1910. In 1902 Archibald H. Bull founded the A. H. Bull Steamship Company. Bull Steamship's next family President was Bull's son Ernest Miller Bull (1875–1943) in 1920. The next family President was Edward Mryon Bull (1904–1953) in 1942, third generation. He took the reins of the company after practicing as a maritime lawyer. In 1956 the company was sold to the American Coal Shipping Company. In 1961 American Coal sold the Bull Line to a Greek company that went into bankruptcy in 1964. Heir apparent, Edward M. Bull, Jr., left the East Coast, and practiced as a maritime lawyer for a time in San Francisco. His son, Edward M. Bull III, continued in the maritime industry, also a practicing maritime lawyer.

== Bull Lines ==
In 1885 Bull acquired his first ship, the SS Eva, a 4,750 dwt, cargo ship, with a British crew of 24. Starting in 1902 Bull chartered foreign ships for foreign shipping to remain profitable. In 1909 he added to his fleet SS Jean, a 4,800 DWT collier, with a German crew of 31. Jean was taken over by the United States Navy in 1917 for World War I service, and returned in 1919. Bull sold the Jean in 1926 and the new owner renamed her SS Margarita Calafati. When the United States entered the World War I in 1917, the US had Bull Lines operate fifteen ships. Some of the ships were built by the United States Shipping Board and others acquired. SS Evelyn (1), a 1912 Bull passenger and freight was taken over by the US Navy in 1917 and returned to Bull in 1919. At the end of World War I were surplus cargo ships, some of which were assigned to Bull. At the end of World War I Bull started service to the eastern Mediterranean and the Black Sea and to the Azores, Canary Islands, and West Africa till 1924. In 1924 new service was added to South Africa and East Africa till 1927. In 1927 service moved to the US Atlantic coastal ports and the West Indies. In 1923, Bull's first passenger ship was a converted 2,286-ton lake freighter cargo ship the SS Catherine. The Catherine offered overnight service between San Juan and Saint Thomas in the Virgin Islands. For World War II the Catherine was taken over by the UN Navy as USS Stratford. In 1925, Bull bought SS Brazos. Brazos was built by Newport News Shipbuilding Co., Newport News, Virginia, in 1907, she displaced 6,576 gross tons, and was 401 feet long. In 1930 the Bull Line had the passenger ship, SS Barbara offer service between Baltimore and San Juan. The Catherine and Barbara were the only passenger ships in the fleet at that time. Barbara was bought from the Grace Line, formerly called SS Santa Cruz. In 1934, two new cargo ships joined the Bull fleet. The two ships were a new type, built with resembled components, which greatly reduce the building time. The ships would be classified later for World War II construction as type C4-class ships. The new ships were the SS Angelina and Manuela. (Both were sunk by U-boats in 1942).

=== World War II ===
World War II ended all Bull passenger services. Bull ships were put into action to support the war effort. Three of Bull Lines ships were taken over by the US government. Bull Lines was active with charter shipping with the Maritime Commission and War Shipping Administration. During wartime, the Bull Lines operated Victory ships and Liberty ships. The ship was run by its Bull Line crew and the US Navy supplied United States Navy Armed Guards to man the deck guns and radio. The most common armament mounted on these merchant ships were the MK II 20mm Oerlikon autocannon and the 3"/50, 4"/50, and 5"/38 deck guns. Of the ships operated by the Bull Lines 19 ships were lost to German U-boats, beginning with SS Major Wheeler with all hands (35) on February 6, 1942. Bull Lines had lost 14 ships to U-boats by the end of the summer of 1942, and lost its last ship, SS Delisle in October 1943. More than 275 crew were lost during the war aboard Bull Line ships. .

=== After World War II ===
At the war's end in 1945, Bull Line had 19 ships in her fleet. By 1947 there were many surplus cargo ships up for sale at low cost. Bull line bought three Liberty ships operating as colliers the: SS Powellton Seam, SS Chilton Seam and the SS Freeport Seam. Bull renamed the ships: SS Evelyn (2), SS Mae and SS Edith. Bull line bought five Liberty dry cargo ships in 1948 and five cargo-reefer ship of the type C2 the: SS Wheatland, SS Golden Fleece, SS Sweepstakes, SS Duplin, and SS Woodford. The ships were put into service on the Puerto Rico routes. In 1949 Bull bought the passenger ship, SS Borinquen from the Porto Rico Line. Bull had her refurbished and renamed the SS Puerto Rico. The Puerto Rico was put on the New York City to San Juan - Dominica Republic route. The route turned out not to be profitable, due to airline competition, and in 1953 the Puerto Rico was removed from service and to the Arosa Line (Compañia Internacional Transportadora) as SS Arosa Star in 1954. This ended the Bull Lines passenger services. In 1949 other surplus cargo ships were bought: type C2 SS Agwicomet(was Carrier Dove) and the ss Cinch Knot a C1-M-AV1 ship. In 1951 Bull bought another two dry cargo Liberty ships. In Bull Line bought two more type C2 ship from the New York & Cuba Mail SS Co. in 1954.

In late 1950s came the more cost-effective loading and unloading system, container shipping. The vast Bull Line fleet, now aged and on an obsolete system, put the company in decline. So, in 1956 Archibald H. Bull's heirs sold the Bull fleet of ships to the American Coal & Shipping Inc. In 1961 most of the fleet was sold to Kulukundis Maritime Industries Inc. of New York, owned by Greek Manuel K. Kulukundis. Kulukundis bought other ships, but by 1965 Kulukundis was bankrupt and the fleet was sold off one ship at a time.

== Subsidiary Companies ==
Over the 54 years of operations, the A. H. Bull Steamship Company acquired a number of other shipping companies:

== Adams & Co. ==
D. Adams & Co, also called Adams & Company was a subsidiary of the Bull Lines, when Captain Duke Adams became the manager of the Bull's Baltimore office, Adams renamed the company in the early 1920s. In 1925 Adams also became the leader of the Baltimore Insular Line in Baltimore. The name changed back when Adams stepped down.

== Puerto Rico-American steamship Company ==
Puerto Rico-American steamship Company was bought in June 1925 by Bull Lines. Puerto Rico-American steamship Company was run by John Light. After purchase Light moved to the Baltimore Insular Line New York office. The Puerto Rico-American steamship Company was founded by J. B. Wright. Some accused Bull Lines of unfair competition, for buying up all the completion to Puerto Rico. Bull ran lines from Baltimore, Philadelphia, and Norfolk, Virginia to Puerto Rico. Later the ports of Charleston, Jacksonville, Florida, and Savannah, Georgia were added. The line serviced the growing sugar industry there. By 1930 Bull was operating most of the sugar cargo out of Puerto Rico

== Baltimore Carolina line ==
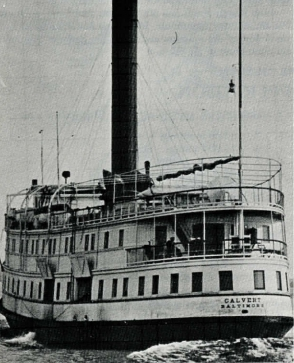
Weems Line Steamer Calvert in 1901

Bull bought the small Baltimore Carolina line, also called the Weems Line from the Baltimore & Carolina Steamship Company in 1929 and it became a subsidiary of Bull. Baltimore Carolina line served the ports of Baltimore, Philadelphia and Miami with two ships the: SS Esther Weems and SS Mary Weems. Weems Line other shipers were the: William F Romer (1890–1916), Lancaster (1924–1928). Captain George Weems (?-n 1874)started the line (also called the Weems Steamboat Company) in 1817 with the steamboat Surprise, then the steamboat Eagle (had boiler explosion in 1824), and then Patuxent. Weems son's became Captains: George Weems, Jr. Mason L. Weems; and Theodore Weems. More ships were added George Weems 1858 (fire 1871), Theodore Weems 1872, L. Weems 1881, Matilda, Wenonah, Essex, Potomac, Ann Arundel, Calvert, Westmoreland, Caroline and St. Mary's (fire 1907). Weems Line was sold to M.D. & V. in 1905.

== Clyde-Mallory Line ==
Clyde-Mallory Line was bought in 1934 by the Bull Lines. The Clyde-Mallory Line was formed when the Mallory Line merged with Clyde Line. The Clyde-Mallory Line was closed and the fleet became part of the Bull fleet. Clyde-Mallory Lines main ports were: Jacksonville, New York, Miami, Boston, Wilmington, Charleston, Key West, Galveston, Tampa, New Orleans and Mobile.

== Baltimore Insular Line ==
Baltimore Insular Line and Bull Insular were subsidiary of A. H. Bull & Company. A. H. Bull bought the Insular Line in 1914 and renamed it the Baltimore Insular Line. The Insular Line was founded in 1904 with both freight and passenger service. Insular Line was operating with the ship, SS Elizabeth, from A. H. Bull old company. The line was also called the Bull Insular Line with service between Baltimore, New York City and San Juan, Puerto Rico. Baltimore Insular Line was Bull Lines passenger operation, with homeport at Baltimore Pier 5 with service to St. Thomas and San Juan. Bull Insular Line operated the ships: Carolyn, Delfina, Delisle, Governor John Lind, Major Wheeler and Marina (1). Only the Marina (1), Carolyn and Governor John Lind survived World War II, the three others were sunk by U-Boats. During World War II Pier 5 was damaged by German torpedoes. 39.284397°N 76.606028°W

== Ericsson Line ==
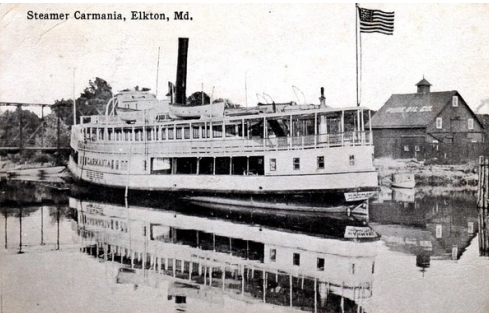
Ericsson Line steamer Carmania in 1916

Ericsson Line steamer Lord Baltimore in 1916

Ericsson Line was subsidiary of A. H. Bull & Company starting in 1931. The line was started by the Baltimore and Philadelphia Steamboat Company, founded on February 23, 1844. The ships on the line had narrow propeller ships, rather than the wider steam paddle ships of the time. Erricson Line had passenger and freight daily service between Philadelphia and Baltimore, via the Chesapeake & Delaware Canal from 1926 to 1936. The line had stops in Cecil County: Reybold's Wharf, Town Point and Chesapeake City. The company had run cargo ship starting in 1829 and added passenger boats in 1838, then incorporated in 1844. The line was named after John Ericsson (1803-1889), the Swedish-American inventor of the screw propeller.

=== Ericsson Line Ships ===
- SS Penn, built in 1903
- SS Lord Baltimore, built in 1903
- SS John Cadwalader, built in 1926
- SS Ericsson
- SS A. Groves
- SS Richard Willing
- SS General Cadwallader
- SS Louise
- SS Jr. Penn
- SS Carmania

== Blue Lines ships ==
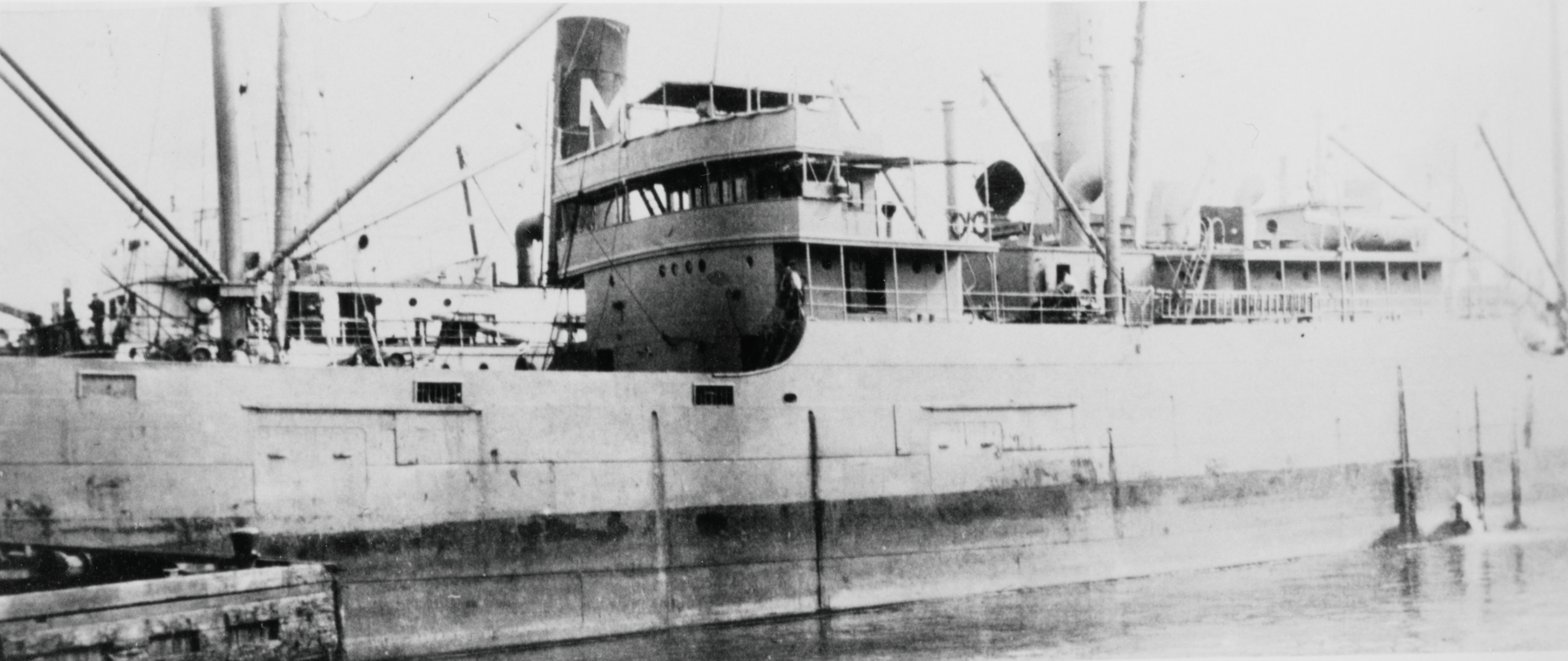
USS Atik, seen here as SS Carolyn

Blue Lines ships:

- Angelina, built in 1934 by Newport News Shipbuilding & Drydock Company, Newport News, was sunk by torpedo by U-618 on 17 October 1942.
- Angelina (2), built in 1943 by Bethlehem Fairfield Shipyards Inc., Baltimore, Maryland, a Liberty type EC2-S-C1, bought in 1947.
- Ann Marie, built in 1945 by Walter Butler Shipbuilding, Superior, was SS Cinch Knot, a type C1-M-AV1, bought in 1949 from Ward Line.
- Arlyn, built in 1919 by Pusey & Jones Co., Gloucester, New Jersey, was SS Castle Wood, bought in 1925, torpedoed and damaged by U-165 on 28 August 1942, then sank by U[517.
- Arlyn (2), built in 1942 by Bethlehem, Baltimore, was SS William Rawle, a Liberty ship bought in 1947.
- Barbara (1), built in 1918 by Manitowoc Shipbuilding Corp., Manitowoc, Wisconsin, was SS Lake Winthrop, bought in 1925, also was SS Norna, sank 16 September 1931 off Grimma LH, S Rorvik.
- Barbara (2), built in 1913 by William Cramp & Sons, Philadelphia, was SS Santa Cruz, bought in 1930 from Grace Line. Sunk on 7 March 1942 by U-126.
- Beatrice (1), built in 1917 by Bethlehem Steel Co., Sparrow's Point, Maryland, sunk on 24 May 1942 by U-558.
- Beatrice (2), built in 1944 by North Carolina Shipbuilding Corp., Wilmington, Del., was USS Wheatland, a type C2-S-AJ3 ship, bought 1946. was also sold SS Bangor, SS Grand Loyalty.
- Betty, built in 1918 by Superior Shipbuilding, was SS Lake Agomac, bought 1931 from Baltimore & Carolina S.S.Co., sank 14 August 1940 by U-59 near Tory Island.
- Carolyn (1), built in 1899 by Turnbull & Sons, Whitby, was SS Parkgate, bought 1904 from Turnbull, Scott & Co., London, sank 6 June 1916 off Gorodetskiy, LH.
- Carolyn (2) built in 1912 by Newport News Shipbuilding, to US Navy in 1942 and renamed Atik used as a Q ship, sank 26 March 1942 U-123.
- Carolyn (3), built in 1942 by Bethlehem, Baltimore, was SS Richard Bassett, Liberty ship, bought 1947,
- Catherine, built in 1918 by Manitowoc Shipbuilding Corp., Manitowoc, Wisconsin, was SS Lake Greenwood, to US Navy 1941 renamed SS Stratford.
- Clare, built 1915 by Maryland Steel Co., Sparrow's Point, Maryland, sunk by U-103 20 May 1942 off Cuba.
- Cornelia, built 1916 by Bethlehem Steel Maryland
- Dora, built 1918 by American Shipbuilding Corp., Buffalo, was SS Lake Galera, bought 1931 from Baltimore & Carolina S.S. Co., was also SS Sniafiocco, sank on 20 July 1940 by bomb at Tobruk harbour.
- Dorothy (1), built in 1898 by W. Gray & Co. Ltd, West Hartlepool, was SS Wilster, bought 1902 from Trechmann S.S.Co. Ltd, sank 14 January 1923 off Puerto Plata.
- Dorothy (2), built in 1918, by Harlan & Hollingsworth, Wilmington, Delaware, was SS Biran, bought 1924 from United Fruit Co, sank on 1 September 1929 in collision off Smith's Point, Chesapeake Bay.
- Dorothy (3), built in 1918 by Bethlehem, Maryland, was SS Cape Henry, bought 1929, sank 1 September 1929 in collision off Smith's Point.
- Dorothy (4), built in 1943 by Bethlehem, Baltimore, was SS Henry L. Benning, a Liberty ship, bought 1947, also SS Emma.
- Dorothy (5), built in 1945 by Sun Shipbuilding, Penn., SS Marine Fox, type C4-S-B2 a troop transport, was also SS Mobile, SS Seattle, and SS Pittsburgh.
- Edith (1), built in 1898 by J.L. Thompson & Sons, Sunderland. Was SS Glenochil, bought 1901 from J. Potter & Co., sank 30 August 1915 off Cape Hinchenbrook, Alaska.
- Edith (2), built in 1915 by Maryland Steel, 7 June 1942 by U-159.
- Edith (3), 1945 built by Delta Shipbuilding Company, New Orleans, Louisiana, was Freeport Seam, a collier, a Liberty EC2-S-AW1 ship, in 1946 was bought renamed Edith, in 1963 scrapped at Hirao. 6,643 tons.
- Elizabeth (1), 1919, built by Bethlehem Steel Co., Wilmington. Was Macomet, in 1922 bought renamed Elizabeth, 4 November 1935 wrecked. 3,438 tons.
- Elizabeth (2), 1918, built by Standard Shipbuilding Corp., Shooter's Island, New York. Was Muscatine, was Floridian in 1928, in 1936 bought from American Hawaiian Steam Ship Co. renamed Elizabeth, 20 May 1942 sunk by torpedo and shellfire by U-103 with the loss of 6 lives. 4,727 tons.
- Elizabeth (3), 1945, built by North Carolina Shipbuilding Corp., Wilmington, NC. Was Sweepstakes, a C2-S-AJ1, in 1946 bought renamed Elizabeth, 1963 sold renamed Adams, in 1963 sold renamed Southport II, in June 1969 scrapped at Kaohsiung. 8,191 tons.
- Ellenor, 1920, built by Bethlehem Shipbuilding Corp., Wilmington, Delaware. Was Mason City, in 1922 bought renamed Ellenor, in 1946 sold renamed Marcella, 21 March 1958 was wrecked off Nuevitas, in 1958 scrapped at Jacksonville. 3,483 tons.
- Emilia (1), 1918, built by Bethlehem Steel Co., Sparrow's Point, Maryland. Launched as War Mercury, but completed as Cape Romain in 1929 bought renamed Emilia, in 1951 sold to Brasile Shipping Co., Honduras renamed Isabel, in 1953 sold to Cia Comercial y Financiera Sudamericana, Panama renamed Rosalind, in 1956 to Overseas Enterprise Inc., Panama, 3 February 1956 foundered in bad weather at 33.21N 27.50E. 4,719 tons
- Emilia (2), 1944, built by Moore Drydock Co., Oakland, California. Was Pampero, standard ship type C2-S-B1, was Agwiking in 1947, was Siboney in 1950, was Plandome in 1954, in 1954 bought from New York & Cuba Mail SS Co. renamed Emilia, in 1963 sold renamed Taddei Village, 15 March 1964 grounded and scrapped. 8,191 tons.
- Evelyn (1), 1912, built by Newport News Shipbuilding & Drydock Company, Newport News. In 1942 to US Navy renamed Asterion used as a Q ship, 1944 used as a weather ship, in 1946 scrapped. 3,140 tons.
- Evelyn (2), 1945, built by Delta Shipbuilding Company, New Orleans, Louisiana, was Powellton Seam, a Collier, a Liberty EC2-S-AW1 ship, in 1946 bought renamed Evelyn, in 1963 was scrapped at Hirao. 6,643 tons.
- Frances (1), 1919, built by McDougall Duluth, Duluth, was Chautauque, was Frances Weems in 1925, in 1931 was bought from Baltimore & Carolina S.S.Co. Inc., Baltimore renamed Frances, in 1940 sold to Bowater Pulp & Paper renamed North Brook, in 1946 sold to West China Dev. Corp. renamed Pei Chuen, 20 May 1948 wrecked on Chiengtieng Rocks, Nantung. 2,323 tons.
- Frances (2), 1944, built by North Carolina Shipbuilding Corp., Wilmington, NC. Was Golden Fleece, a C2-S-AJ1 ship, in 1946 bought renamed Frances, in 1964 sold to Marad renamed Delaware, November 1968 scrapped at Portland. 8,191 tons.
- Georgeanna, 1916, built by Harlan & Hollingworth Corp., Wilmington, Delaware. Was Georgeanne Weems, 1929 bought from Baltimore & Carolina S.S. Co. Inc., Baltimore renamed Georgeanna, in 1942 sold to United Fruit Co. Honduras flag renamed Georgeanna, in 1951 scrapped. 2,089 tons.
- Helen, 1916, built by Bethlehem Steel Co., Sparrow's Point, Maryland. In 1951 scrapped at Bordentown. 3,129 tons.

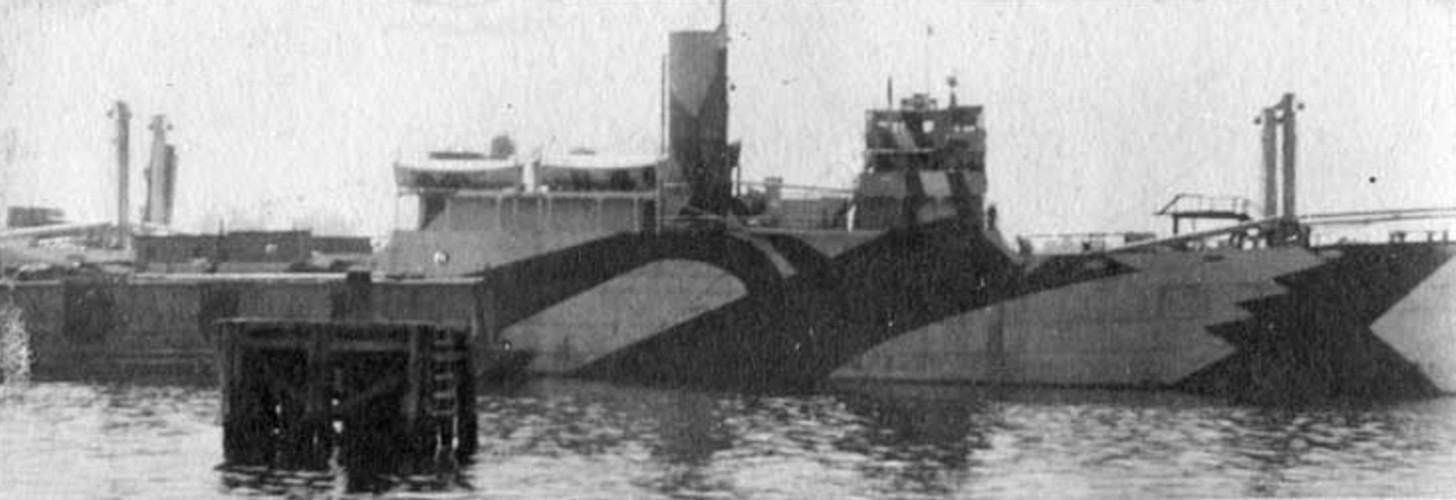
SS Hilton as Ice King in 1918

- Hilton (1), 1912, built by Newport News Shipbuilding & Drydocking Corp., Newport News. Was USS Ice King, in 1935 sold renamed Hercules and converted into a barge, 1951 scrapped at Norfolk. 3,102 tons.
- Hilton (2), 1918, built by Standard Shipbuilding Corp., Shooter's Island, New York. Was Passaic, but completed as Ice King was Georgian in 1928, 1936 bought from Strachan's Southern SS Co., Savannah. renamed Hilton, in 1950 scrapped at Fieldsbro’ NJ. 4,741 tons.
- Hilton (3), 1944, built by Bethlehem Fairfield Shipyards Inc., Baltimore, Maryland. Was Morris Hillquit, a Liberty EC2-S-C1 ship, in 1947 bought renamed Hilton, in 1963 sold to Jayanti Shipping Co., Bombay & London, Indian flag renamed Govind Jayanti, in 1966 scrapped at Hamburg. 7,191 tons.
- Ines, 1946, built by Consolidated Steel Corp., Wilmington, California. Was Carrier Dove a C2-S-B1 ship, was Agwicomet in 1947, in 1949 bought from New York & Cuba Mail SS Co. renamed Ines, in 1963 sold renamed Jackson, in 1963 sold renamed Bonanza, 1964 sold renamed Express Virginia, in 1966 sustained bottom damage and laid up, in 1969 scrapped. 8,191 tons.
- Irene, 1919, built by Bethlehem Shipbuilding Corp., Wilmington, Delaware. Was Bethnor, in 1922 bought renamed Irene, in 1939 sold to G. Hansen, Norway renamed Nidarholm. 12 February 1940 sunk by torpedo by U-26. 4,902 tons.
- Isobel, 1919, built by McDougall Duluth, Duluth. Was Chappell, was Isobel Weems in 1926, in 1931 bought from Baltimore & Carolina S.S. Co. Inc., Baltimore renamed Isobel, in 1937 sold to Italo-Baltica renamed Lanital, in 1938 sold to G. d'Ali & Co. renamed Erice, 14 May 1943 bombed and sunk at Civitavecchia. 2,323 tons
- Jean, 1909, built by Newport News Shipbuilding & Drydocking Corp., Newport News. In 1926 sold to A. Calafatis renamed Margarita Calafati, in 1927 sold to C.D. Calafatis renamed Gladstone, in 1928 sold to M. Sandberg & Co. renamed Sports, in 1941 seized by German forces, renamed Magdalena. In 1947 returned to owners renamed Sports, in 1954 scrapped at Dunstan. 3,126 tons.
- Jean (2), 1918, built by Bethlehem Steel Co., Sparrow's Point, Maryland. Was launched as War Shark but completed as Cape Lookout, was Koskiuszko in 1919, in 1929 bought from Polish American Navigation Corp., New York renamed Jean, in 1954 scrapped at Baltimore. 4,902 tons
- Jean (3), 1944, built by Moore Drydock Co., Oakland, California. was Sovereign of the Seas, a C2-S-B1, was Agwidale in 1948, was Oriente in 1950, was Short Hills in 1954, in 1955 bought from New York & Cuba Mail SS Co. renamed Jean, in 1964 sold renamed Oceanic Tide, in 1969 scrapped at Kaohsiung. 8,191 tons.
- Kathryn, 1944, built by North Carolina Shipbuilding Corp., Wilmington, Del. Was USS Duplin, a C2-S-AJ3, in 1946 bought renamed Katryn, in 1964 sold to E.J. Smith & Co. renamed Bangor, in 1968 sold renamed Dearborn, in 1963 sold to Oriental Exporters renamed Rio Grande, in 1965 to Marad, In 1971 scrapped at Portland. 8,191 tons.
- Lillian, 1922, built by Bethlehem Shipbuilding Corp., Wilmington, Delaware. Was Maddequet, in 1922 bought renamed Lillian, 27 February 1939 sunk after collision. 3,482 tons.
- Mae (1), 1918, built by Skinner & Eddy Corp., Seattle. Was West Eldara, in 1936 bought renamed Mae, 17 September 1942 torpedoed, shelled and sunk by U-515 with the loss of 1 life. 5,607 tons.
- Mae (2), 1945, built by Delta Shipbuilding Company, New Orleans, Louisiana. Was Chilton Seam, a collier, a Liberty EC2-S-AW1, in 1946 bought renamed Mae, in 1963 scrapped at Hirao. 6,643 tons.
- Manuela, 1934, built by Newport News Shipbuilding & Drydock Company, Newport News. On 24 June 1942 torpedoed and damaged byU-404 while in convoy with the loss of 2 lives, on 25 June 1942 sank. 4,772 tons.
- Margaret, 1916, built by Maryland Steel Co., Sparrow's Point, Maryland. On 15 April 1942 was sunk by torpedo by U-571 off Cape Hatteras and lost with all hands. 3,352 tons.
- Marina (2), 1942, built by Pusey & Jones Co., Wilmington, Delaware. A C1-A, ON 16 January 1945 struck mine at Le Havre, was beached, refloated and scrapped at Philadelphia. 5,028 tons.
- Marina (3), 1942, built by Bethlehem-Fairfield Shipyards Inc., Baltimore, Maryland. Was Thaddeus Kosciuszko, a Liberty EC2-S-C1, bought 1947, renamed Marina. In 1954 sold to Isla Colon Cia. Nav., Panama renamed Acritas, 10 March 1956 was grounded at Cape Verde Islands, refloated towed to Lubeck and repaired, in 1956 sold to Elias Cia. Mar., Panama renamed Elias, in 1964 renamed Georges, on 20 September 1962 grounded off North Russia at 69.52N 61.10E, broke up. 7,191 tons.
- Marjory, 1919, built by Mc Dougall Duluth Shipbuilding Co., Duluth, Minnesota. Was Chamberino, was Marjory Weems in 1928, in 1931 bought from Baltimore & Carolina S.S.Co Inc., Baltimore renamed Marjory, 11 February 1952 was wrecked on Maasvlakte Bank, Hook of Holland and scrapped in Amsterdam. 2,323 tons.
- Mary, 1920, built by American International Shipbuilding Corp., Hog Island, Pennsylvania. Laid down as Cassimir but completed as Cody, in 1925 taken over with Tampa Interocean Lines by Lykes, in 1933 transferred to Lykes Brothers Steamship Company, in 1939 bought renamed Mary, on 3 March 1942 sunk by torpedo by U-129 near Georgetown. 5,543 tons.
- Millinocket, 1910, built by Maryland Steel Co., Sparrow's Point, Md. In 1919 chartered to Export Steamship Corp., on 18 June 1942 sunk by torpedo by U-129 on voyage St. Thomas – Mobile with bauxite. 3,274 tons.
- Mopang, 1919, built by the Submarine Boat Company of Newark, hit mine and sank, 30 June 1921.
- Puerto Rico, 1931, built by Bethlehem SB Corp, Quincy Massachusetts. Was Boriquen, in 1949 bought from New York and Porto Rico Steamship Company renamed Puerto Rico, in 1954 sold to Arosa Line renamed Arosa Star, in 1959 sold to Eastern Steamship Lines renamed Bahama Star, in 1969 sold to Western Steamship Co. renamed La Jenelle, on 13 April 1970 destroyed while under tow on her way to being converted into a floating hotel. 7,114 tons.
- Rosario (1), 1920, built by Bethlehem SB Corp, Wilmington, Del. Was Natirar, in 1932 bought from American Scantic Line renamed Rosario, 21 February 1943 sunk by torpedo by U-664 in Atlantic. 4,659 tons.
- Rosario (2), 1942, built by Bethlehem Fairfield Shipyards Inc., Baltimore, Maryland. Was Tristram Dalton, a Liberty EC2-S-C1, in 1947 bought renamed Rosario, in 1954 sold to Isla Colon Cia.Nav., Panama, Liberian flag (Orion Shipping & Trading.Co., NY) renamed Achileus, in 1957 renamed Andros Laurel, in 1957 to Jackson SS Co., Liberian flag (Suwannee SS Co., Jacksonville, Florida), in 1963 sold to Faith Nav.Corp., Liberian flag (Sea King Corp, NY) renamed Grand Faith, 1968 scrapped at Taiwan. 7,191 tons.
- Ruth (1), 1910, built by Newport News Shipbuilding & Drydock Company, Newport News. In 1930 sold to W.J. Myles renamed Meddo, in 1933 scrapped at Philadelphia. 3,102 tons.
- Ruth (2), 1919, built by Todd Dry Dock & Construction Company, Seattle. Was Gaffney, was Barreado in 1928, in 1940 bought renamed Ruth. 29 June 1942 sunk by torpedo by U-153 with the loss of 35 lives. 4,827 tons.
- Suzanne, 1944, built by North Carolina Shipbuilding Corp., Wilmington, Del. Was USS Woodford, a C2-S-AJ3, in 1947 bought renamed Suzanne, in 1965 sold renamed Rappahannock, May 1973 scrapped at Kaohsiung. 8,191 tons.
- Wilhelmina, 1888, built by Wm Gray & Co. Ltd, West Hartlepool. Was New Borough built for C. Furness, West Hartlepool, was Pensacola in 1895, in 1906 bought renamed Wilhelmina, 5 July 1916 sunk in collision Rio de Janeiro bay. 1,696 tons.
- John Smeaton, sugar trade concrete ship. 4,690 tons.

== Baltimore Insular Line Inc. ships ==
Baltimore Insular Line Inc. ships:

- Delfina, 1919, built by Hanlon Dry Dock and Shipbuilding Company, Oakland, California, 15 June 1942 was sunk by torpedo by U-172 with the loss of 4 lives. 5,210 tons.
- Delisle, 1919, built by Hanlon Dry Dock & Shipbuilding Co., Oakland, California, 19 October 1943 was sunk by torpedo by U-220 while in convoy WB 65. 5,210 tons.
- Governor John Lind, 1918, built by Hanlon Dry Dock & Shipbuilding Co., Oakland, California. In 1947 sold to G. Bozzo, Italy renamed Vittorin, in 1954 sold to O. Jacomino renamed Concetta, in 1956 sold to D.A. Ravano renamed Vallecrosia, in 1958 sold renamed Theodoros A, in 1960 sold to Seaforth Nav. Corp. renamed Macuto, in 1960 scrapped at Laspezia. 3,431 tons.
- Major Wheeler, 1918, built by Hanlon Dry Dock & Shipbuilding Co., Oakland, California. 6 February 1942 sunk by torpedo by U-107 east off Cape Hatteras and lost with all hands. 3,431 tons.
- Marina (1), 1887, built by Neafie & Leavy, Philadelphia. Was Josefita built for Menendez & Cia., Cienfuegos, was Dade in 1915, in 1917 was bought from CL Dimon renamed Marina, in 1935 scrapped at Philadelphia. 1,114 tons.

== World War II Merchant Marine ==
A Victory ship

Ships operated by Bull Lines for World War II under the United States Merchant Marine. The ships were owned by the War Shipping Administration and operated by Bull Lines.

=== Victory ships ===
- Hampden – Sydney Victory as troop transport.
- Madawaska Victory as troop transport.
- Albion Victory
- Vassar Victory
- Waycross Victory

=== Liberty ships ===
- William Rawle
- William S. Young
- Barbara Frietchie
- Ben Robertson
- Jose Marti
- Joshua A. Leach
- Julius Olsen
- Thomas Ruffin
- Tristram Dalton
- Samuel J. Tilden, sank in attack.
- Samuel Jordan Kirkwood, sank in attack.
- Nathaniel Macon
- Nathaniel Macon
- Richard Bassett, troop carrier
- Robert R. Livingston
- Rufus W. Peckham
- Francis Asbury
- Freeport Seam, collier
- George Calvert (2)
- George Whitefield
- Powellton Seam, collier
- Clifford E. Ashby
- Henry Lomb
- Ward Hunt
- William B. Woods, sank in attack
- Louis Kossuth
- John Drayton
- John W. Gates
- Alexander Macomb, sunk by U-215, 10 killed
- Edward D. White
- Arthur M. Huddell
- Joseph Hewes
- William MacLay
- Jean Ribaut
- Peter Zenger
- John P. Poe
- Richard H. Alvey
- William Patterson
- William Johnson
- John J. Crittenden

=== Other ===
- Chippewa, later became USAT Chippewa
- Pinellas

== American Coal Shipping Company ==
The American Coal Shipping Company was a joint enterprise formed in 1955, made up of three railroad companies, seven coal companies, and the United Mine Workers. The American Coal Shipping Company bought the Bull Lines in 1956. In 1957, the American Coal Shipping Company added to its fleet of ships by leasing 30 Liberty ships from the US Government. Headquarters was at 17 State Street, New York City and President was W.C. Brewer. The goal was to provide a worldwide coal sales and shipping network. Many saw the partnership of the union and a company as a conflicts of interest, as the union held 33% interest ($3.4 million) of the company, paid with union dues. John Sylvester Routh was the director of the company. The union membership status of the ship's seaman became a major issue for the union. American Coal Shipping Company had 45 ships at its peak but was not able to put all of them into operations due to union issues and court cases. In 1961 American Coal Shipping Company sold the Bull Lines to a Greek Company that closed in 1964.

== See also ==
- World War II United States Merchant Navy
- Baltimore Steam Packet Company
- Port of Baltimore
