= SS Wilhelmina (1888) =

Cargo steamship (1888–1916) - seized by British

History

United Kingdom
- Name: SS New Borough
- Owner: C. Furness & Co.
- Builder: William Gray & Company, West Hartlepool
- Completed: 11 September 1888
- In service: 19 September 1888
- Out of service: 17 April 1895
- Fate: Ran aground, sold and repaired

History

United States
- Name: SS Pensacola
- Owner: Louisville and Nashville Railroad
- Acquired: 1896
- Out of service: 17 February 1906
- Fate: Sold

History

United States
- Name: SS Wilhelmina
- Owner: A.H. Bull & Co.
- In service: 17 February 1906
- Out of service: 1915
- Fate: Sold

History

United States
- Name: SS Wilhelmina
- Owner: Southern Products Trading Co.
- In service: 1915
- Out of service: 1916
- Fate: Sunk due to accidental collision, 5 July 1916

General characteristics
- Class & type: Schooner
- Tonnage: 1,696-1795 GRT, 1,169 NRT
- Length: 260.4 ft (79.4 m)
- Beam: 36.7 ft (11.2 m)
- Depth of hold: 18.2 ft (5.5 m)
- Installed power: 150 hp
- Propulsion: 3 cylinder triple expansion engine, single shaft, 1 screw
- Speed: ~7 knots (13 km/h; 8 mph)
- Crew: ~20

SS Wilhelmina (1888) was a cargo steamship. Owned by an US company during WWI, while sailing from New York City to Hamburg in early 1915 it was seized by the British for carrying contraband foodstuffs, triggering a diplomatic incident over how the British naval blockade of Germany impacted neutral trading rights.

The ship was built as SS New Borough at William Gray & Company, in West Hartlepool, England in 1888, commissioned by the trading company owned by Sir Christopher Furness. In April 1895, the ship ran aground off Wash Wood Beach near the Virginia/North Carolina border, and though there was no loss of life the ship was written off as a total loss. However, the ship was sold to and then repaired by the Gulf Transit Company, a subsidiary of the Louisville and Nashville Railroad company. Renaming the ship the SS Pensacola, they operated the ship under the American flag until they sold it on 17 February 1906 to the A. H. Bull Steamship Company who renamed the ship the SS Wilhelmina, operating it as part of the Bull Line.

== World War I ==
In early 1915, after the outbreak of World War I, the ship was sold to "Southern Products Trading Company", operating out of New York. This company was run by a German-American named John Simons, who it would later emerge had contacts and funding from the German government. Simons made an arrangement with Marshall Hall of the W. L. Green Commission Company, a major exporter of grain, where Hall would charter the vessel to deliver 2,000 tons of various foodstuffs, valued at $200,000 ($6,200,000 in 2024) to Hamburg, Germany. This was to be the first food shipment directly from America to Germany since hostilities begun.

The goal of the exercise was to be a test case for the British naval blockade of Germany. W. T. Brooking, export manager of the company, was to go to Germany on a separate ship to take charge of the consignment, and thereby guarantee that the food would only be sold to the civilian population of Germany. As the blockade at the time had food as a "conditional contraband", and therefore only seizable if destined to military use, Hall was able to obtain assurances from both US Secretary of State William Jennings Bryan and British Foreign Secretary Sir Edward Grey that the shipment was acceptable and would not be interfered with. Wilhelmina thus set sail from New York Harbor on 22 January and British cruisers allowed her to pass.

While the ship was en route, however, on 26 January 1915, the German Federal Council announced a decision made the previous day that the German government would seize all grain in Germany, a decree interpreted by the British as putting the food supply all under the control of the German Army. Over the next few days, the German ambassador to the US von Bernstorff attempted to give guarantees that the decree did not apply to imported grain such as that carried by Wilhemina, and that therefore the ship's cargo would not be used by the military. This did not sway the British nor persuade much of the American public. Meanwhile, the Commission for Relief in Belgium offered to purchase the foodstuffs for the Belgian relief effort, but Hall refused, arguing a humanitarian concern for the German people but also desiring the great profit opportunity of a potential monopoly on food exports to Germany.

The British authorities were initially inconsistent on the intended harshness of the blockade. However, the February 4 German announcement of a "war zone" in which British ships would be sunk without restriction hardened opinion. By this point in her journey, Wilhemina had received storm damage, and so sailed of her own volition into Falmouth, Cornwall on February 9 in need of repairs. The British put an armed guard on the ship, and declared that the vessel would go through prize court proceedings. In the event, formal proceedings never took place, though a storm of diplomacy ensued where the Germans used the vessel to justify their submarine campaign, the British sought to justify their blockade, and the Americans declared their opposition to the British breach of historical precedent and their acceptance of the German position that the late January decree did not impact the ship's cargo. American attempts to get the British to observe the 1909 Declaration of London in return for an end to the submarine campaign failed as the Germans wanted full use of submarines (and did not consider the blockade to be serious at the time), and the British wanted full use of their blockade (and did not consider the threat of submarines to be serious at the time). Thus, the 1915 U-boat campaign continued until the sinking of the SS Arabic (1902), while the British issued a March 11 Order in Council to "seize all ships carrying goods of presumed enemy destination, ownership, or origin".

The British Order rendered moot the argument over the conditionally contraband nature of the Wilhelmina cargo. The British suggested a settlement presided over by Lord Mersey, which was accepted by the American side. The New York Times reported that an initial payment of £20,000, or $100,000 ($2,900,000 in 2024) was paid in June of 1915. Eventually in mid-1916 Lord Mersey awarded Hall's company the full (Hamburg) value of the cargo plus damages £78,400, approximately $392,000 ($11,000,000 in 2024), but denied the principle of free trading rights.

=== Sinking ===
On 5 July 1916 the Wilhelmina was struck by a Brazilian navy transport, the SS Sargento Albuquerque in the bay of Rio de Janeiro. The ship sank with no loss of life.

== Bibliography ==
Notes

References

- Hartlepool History Then & Now (2025). "New Borough". Hartlepool Borough Council.
- "First Wilhelmina Payment". The New York Times. New York City: Adolph Ochs. June 30, 1915. pp. 1–22. ISSN 0362-4331. OCLC 1645522.
- "GET $392,000 VERDICT IN WILHELMINA CASE; Lord Mersey Awards Practically the Full Claim of Owners of Cargo with Interest". The New York Times. New York City: Adolph Ochs. July 14, 1916. pp. 1–20. ISSN 0362-4331. OCLC 1645522.
