= SS Mary =

Cargo ship

History

United States
- Name: Cody (1920–1939); Mary (1939–1942)
- Owner: USSB (1920–1930); Tampa Interocean Steamship Co. (1930–1939); Bull Insular Steamship (1939–1942)
- Builder: American International Shipbuilding Corporation, Philadelphia
- Yard number: 1535
- Launched: 19 June 1920
- Completed: September 1920
- Identification: US Official Number 220608; code letters: MBLF (1920–1933); call sign KDEX (1934–1942)
- Fate: Sunk, 3 March 1942

General characteristics
- Type: Design 1022 cargo ship
- Tonnage: 5,104 GRT; 3,113 NRT; 7,825 DWT
- Length: 390.0 ft (118.9 m)
- Beam: 54.2 ft (16.5 m)
- Depth: 27.8 ft (8.5 m)
- Installed power: Oil-fired steam turbines, 2500 ihp
- Propulsion: Single screw
- Speed: 11.5 knots (21.3 km/h; 13.2 mph)
- Range: 9,000 miles

SS Mary was a Design 1022 cargo ship built for the United States Shipping Board immediately after World War I.

== History ==
She was laid down at yard number 1535 at the Philadelphia, Pennsylvania shipyard of the American International Shipbuilding Corporation, one of 110 Design 1022 cargo ships built for the United States Shipping Board. She was completed in 1920 and named Cody. In 1930, she was purchased by Tampa Interocean Steamship Company. In 1939, she was purchased by Bull-Insular Steamship Company (A.H. Bull & Co) and renamed SS Mary. On February 7, 1942, she collided with the U.S. freighter SS Palimol at 24°50′N 66°0′W and made her way to San Juan, Puerto Rico for repairs. On March 3, 1942, she was torpedoed and sunk by German submarine U-129, 250 miles northeast of Paramaribo, Suriname (08°25′N 52°50′W). Survivors were picked up by the freighter SS Alcoa Scout.

== Bibliography ==
- McKellar, Norman L. "Steel Shipbuilding under the U. S. Shipping Board, 1917-1921, Part II, Contract Steel Ships, p. 588" (PDF). Steel Shipbuilding under the U. S. Shipping Board, 1917-1921. ShipScribe.
- Marine Review (1921). "1920 Construction Record of U.S. Yards -Cody". The Marine Review. 51 (February). New York: 97.
