= SS William B. Woods =

Liberty ship of WWII

History

United States
- Name: William B. Woods
- Namesake: William B. Woods
- Owner: War Shipping Administration (WSA)
- Operator: A. H. Bull & Company, Inc.
- Ordered: as type (EC2-S-C1) hull, MC hull 1490
- Builder: J.A. Jones Construction, Brunswick, Georgia
- Cost: $2,740,069
- Yard number: 106
- Way number: 2
- Laid down: 6 July 1942
- Launched: 13 March 1943
- Sponsored by: Mrs. Emil J. Kratt
- Completed: 7 May 1943
- Identification: Call sign: KHQC
- Fate: Torpedoed and sunk, 10 March 1944

General characteristics
- Class & type: Liberty ship; type EC2-S-C1, standard
- Tonnage: 10,865 LT DWT; 7,176 GRT
- Displacement: 3,380 long tons (3,434 t) (light); 14,245 long tons (14,474 t) (max)
- Length: 441 feet 6 inches (135 m) oa; 416 feet (127 m) pp; 427 feet (130 m) lwl
- Beam: 57 feet (17 m)
- Draft: 27 ft 9.25 in (8.4646 m)
- Installed power: 2 × Oil fired 450 °F (232 °C) boilers, operating at 220 psi (1,500 kPa); 2,500 hp (1,900 kW)
- Propulsion: 1 × triple-expansion steam engine, (manufactured by General Machinery Corp., Hamilton, Ohio); 1 × screw propeller
- Speed: 11.5 knots (21.3 km/h; 13.2 mph)
- Capacity: 562,608 cubic feet (15,931 m^{3}) (grain); 499,573 cubic feet (14,146 m^{3}) (bale)
- Complement: 38–62 USMM; 21–40 USNAG
- Armament: Varied by ship; Bow-mounted 3-inch (76 mm)/50-caliber gun; Stern-mounted 4-inch (102 mm)/50-caliber gun; 2–8 × single 20-millimeter (0.79 in) Oerlikon anti-aircraft (AA) cannons and/or, 2–8 × 37-millimeter (1.46 in) M1 AA guns

SS William B. Woods was a Liberty ship built in the United States during World War II. Named after William B. Woods, an Associate Justice of the Supreme Court of the United States and a member of the Ohio General Assembly.

== Construction ==
William B. Woods was laid down on 21 July 1942, under a United States Maritime Commission (MARCOM) contract, MC hull 1490, by J.A. Jones Construction, Brunswick, Georgia; sponsored by Mrs. Emil J. Kratt, and launched on 7 April 1943.

== History ==
She was allocated to A. H. Bull & Company, Inc. on 31 May 1943. On 10 March 1944, she was torpedoed and sunk by the German submarine U-952 near Palermo, Italy, 38.43°N 13.50°E, with the loss of one US Navy Armed Guard and fifty-one United States Army personnel.

== Bibliography ==
- "Jones Construction, Brunswick GA". ShipbuildingHistory.com. 13 October 2010.
- "Liberty Ships – World War II".
- Maritime Administration. "William B. Woods". Ship History Database Vessel Status Card. U.S. Department of Transportation, Maritime Administration. Archived from the original on 12 December 2019.
- Davies, James (May 2004). "Specifications (As-Built)" (PDF). p. 23.
- "SS William B. Woods".
