= SS Edward D. White =

World War II Liberty ship of the United States

History

United States
- Name: Edward D. White
- Namesake: Edward Douglass White
- Owner: War Shipping Administration (WSA)
- Operator: A.H. Bull & Company
- Ordered: as type (EC2-S-C1) hull, MC hull 1499
- Builder: J.A. Jones Construction, Brunswick, Georgia
- Cost: $1,826,051
- Yard number: 115
- Way number: 5
- Laid down: 22 June 1943
- Launched: 20 September 1943
- Completed: 30 September 1943
- Identification: Call Signal: KIRD
- Fate: Laid up in National Defense Reserve Fleet, James River Group, Lee Hall, Virginia, 17 December 1947; Laid up in National Defense Reserve Fleet, Hudson River Group, 7 May 1952; Sold for scrapping, 11 June 1970

General characteristics
- Class & type: Liberty ship; type EC2-S-C1, standard
- Tonnage: 10,865 LT DWT; 7,176 GRT
- Displacement: 3,380 long tons (3,434 t) (light); 14,245 long tons (14,474 t) (max)
- Length: 441 feet 6 inches (135 m) oa; 416 feet (127 m) pp; 427 feet (130 m) lwl
- Beam: 57 feet (17 m)
- Draft: 27 ft 9.25 in (8.4646 m)
- Installed power: 2 × Oil fired 450 °F (232 °C) boilers, operating at 220 psi (1,500 kPa); 2,500 hp (1,900 kW)
- Propulsion: 1 × triple-expansion steam engine, (manufactured by Filer and Stowell, Milwaukee, Wisconsin); 1 × screw propeller
- Speed: 11.5 knots (21.3 km/h; 13.2 mph)
- Capacity: 562,608 cubic feet (15,931 m^{3}) (grain); 499,573 cubic feet (14,146 m^{3}) (bale)
- Complement: 38–62 USMM; 21–40 USNAG
- Armament: Varied by ship; Bow-mounted 3-inch (76 mm)/50-caliber gun; Stern-mounted 4-inch (102 mm)/50-caliber gun; 2–8 × single 20-millimeter (0.79 in) Oerlikon anti-aircraft (AA) cannons and/or, 2–8 × 37-millimeter (1.46 in) M1 AA guns

SS Edward D. White was a Liberty ship built in the United States during World War II. She was named after Edward Douglass White, the ninth Chief Justice of the United States and a United States senator from Louisiana.

== Construction ==
Edward D. White was laid down on 22 June 1943, under a Maritime Commission (MARCOM) contract, MC hull 1499, by J.A. Jones Construction, Brunswick, Georgia, and launched on 30 September 1943.

== History ==
She was allocated to A.H. Bull & Company, on 30 September 1943. On 17 December 1945, she was laid up in the National Defense Reserve Fleet in the James River Group, Lee Hall, Virginia. On 5 May 1953, she was withdrawn from the fleet to be loaded with grain under the "Grain Program 1953", she returned loaded with grain on 20 May 1953. She was again withdrawn from the fleet on 4 November 1957, to have the grain unloaded, she returned empty on 8 November 1957. On 27 October 1958, she was withdrawn from the fleet to be loaded with grain under the "Grain Program 1958", she returned loaded with grain on 10 November 1958. She was again withdrawn from the fleet on 8 September 1959, to have the grain unloaded, she returned empty on 12 September 1959. On 11 June 1970, she was sold to Union Mineral & Alloys Corporation, for $43,212, for scrapping, she was delivered on 30 July 1970.

== Bibliography ==
- "Jones Construction, Brunswick GA". www.ShipbuildingHistory.com. 13 October 2010.
- "Liberty Ships – World War II".
- Maritime Administration. "Edward D. White". Ship History Database Vessel Status Card. U.S. Department of Transportation, Maritime Administration. Archived from the original on 12 December 2019.
- Davies, James (May 2004). "Specifications (As-Built)" (PDF). p. 23.
- "SS Edward D. White".
