= SS Joseph Hewes =

World War II Liberty ship of the United States

History

United States
- Name: Joseph Hewes
- Namesake: Joseph Hewes
- Builder: North Carolina Shipbuilding Company, Wilmington, North Carolina
- Yard number: 26
- Way number: 7
- Laid down: 22 September 1941
- Launched: 29 March 1942
- Fate: Sold for scrap 1967

General characteristics
- Type: Liberty ship
- Tonnage: 7,000 long tons deadweight (DWT)
- Length: 441 ft 6 in (134.57 m)
- Beam: 56 ft 11 in (17.35 m)
- Draft: 27 ft 9 in (8.46 m)
- Propulsion: Two oil-fired boilers; Triple expansion steam engine; Single screw; 2,500 hp (1,864 kW)
- Speed: 11 knots (20 km/h; 13 mph)
- Capacity: 9,140 tons cargo
- Complement: 41
- Armament: 1 × Stern-mounted 4 in (100 mm) deck gun; AA guns

SS Joseph Hewes (MC contract 217) was a Liberty ship built in the United States during World War II. She was named after Joseph Hewes, Secretary of the Naval Affairs in the 2nd Continental Congress and signer of the Declaration of Independence for North Carolina.

The ship was laid down by North Carolina Shipbuilding Company in their Cape Fear River yard on September 22, 1941, and launched on March 29, 1942. She was chartered to A. H. Bull Steamship Company upon completion in 1942 by the War Shipping Administration. This was renewed in May 1947. In August of that year it was chartered to the States Marine Corporation. It was briefly operated in October 1948 by the South Atlantic Steamship Company before being laid up in the National Defense Reserve Fleet at Beaumont, Texas. It was sold for scrap in 1967.

== See also ==
- USS Joseph Hewes (AP-50)
