= SS Francis Asbury =

Liberty ship of WWII

History

United States
- Name: Francis Asbury
- Namesake: Francis Asbury
- Owner: War Shipping Administration (WSA)
- Operator: A.H. Bull & Co., Inc.
- Ordered: as type (EC2-S-C1) hull, MC hull 1195
- Builder: St. Johns River Shipbuilding Company, Jacksonville, Florida
- Cost: $2,452,124
- Yard number: 3
- Way number: 3
- Laid down: 9 September 1942
- Launched: 17 April 1943
- Sponsored by: Mrs. Benjamin F. Crowles
- Completed: 5 June 1943
- Identification: Call sign: KIUO
- Fate: Struck mine, Constructive Total Loss (CTL), 3 December 1944; Sold for scrapping, 6 April 1953, delivered, 28 April 1953

General characteristics
- Class & type: Liberty ship; type EC2-S-C1, standard
- Tonnage: 10,865 LT DWT; 7,176 GRT
- Displacement: 3,380 long tons (3,434 t) (light); 14,245 long tons (14,474 t) (max)
- Length: 441 feet 6 inches (135 m) oa; 416 feet (127 m) pp; 427 feet (130 m) lwl
- Beam: 57 feet (17 m)
- Draft: 27 ft 9.25 in (8.4646 m)
- Installed power: 2 × Oil fired 450 °F (232 °C) boilers, operating at 220 psi (1,500 kPa); 2,500 hp (1,900 kW)
- Propulsion: 1 × triple-expansion steam engine, (manufactured by General Machinery Corp., Hamilton, Ohio); 1 × screw propeller
- Speed: 11.5 knots (21.3 km/h; 13.2 mph)
- Capacity: 562,608 cubic feet (15,931 m^{3}) (grain); 499,573 cubic feet (14,146 m^{3}) (bale)
- Complement: 38–62 USMM; 21–40 USNAG
- Armament: Varied by ship; Bow-mounted 3-inch (76 mm)/50-caliber gun; Stern-mounted 4-inch (102 mm)/50-caliber gun; 2–8 × single 20-millimeter (0.79 in) Oerlikon anti-aircraft (AA) cannons and/or, 2–8 × 37-millimeter (1.46 in) M1 AA guns

SS Francis Asbury was a Liberty ship built in the United States during World War II. She was named after Francis Asbury, one of the first two bishops of the Methodist Episcopal Church in the United States. Asbury traveled thousands of miles those living on the frontier to deliver hundreds of sermons each year.

== Construction ==
Francis Asbury was laid down on 12 September 1942, under a Maritime Commission (MARCOM) contract, MC hull 1195, by the St. Johns River Shipbuilding Company, Jacksonville, Florida; she was sponsored by Mrs. Benjamin F. Crowles, the wife of one of the vice presidents of the St. John's River SB Co., she was launched on 17 April 1943.

== History ==
She was allocated to A.H. Bull & Co., Inc., on 5 June. On 3 December 1944, she was mined off Ostend, Belgium, while steaming from New York to Ostend, with war supplies. She was beached off Blankenberge, and declared a Constructive Total Loss (CTL). She was sold for scrapping, on 6 April 1953, to Hydraulica, for $2000. She was delivered, 28 April 1953.

Wreck location: 51°21′N 3°0′E

== Bibliography ==
- "St. John's River Shipbuilding, Jacksonville FL". www.ShipbuildingHistory.com. 16 October 2010.
- Maritime Administration. "Francis Asbury". Ship History Database Vessel Status Card. U.S. Department of Transportation, Maritime Administration.
- Davies, James (May 2004). "Specifications (As-Built)" (PDF). p. 23.
- "SS Francis Asbury".
