= SS William Patterson =

Liberty ship of WWII

History

United States
- Name: William Patterson
- Namesake: William Patterson
- Owner: War Shipping Administration (WSA)
- Operator: A.H. Bull & Co., Inc.
- Ordered: as type (EC2-S-C1) hull, MCE hull 48
- Awarded: 14 March 1941
- Builder: Bethlehem-Fairfield Shipyard, Baltimore, Maryland
- Cost: $1,063,819
- Yard number: 2035
- Way number: 9
- Laid down: 29 April 1942
- Launched: 26 June 1942
- Sponsored by: Miss Gladys Mitchell
- Completed: 13 July 1942
- Refit: converted to EC2-G-8g, 14 September 1957
- Identification: Call sign: KFVC
- Fate: Laid up in the Hudson River Reserve Fleet, Jones Point, New York, 23 September 1948; Laid up in the National Defense Reserve Fleet, Wilmington, North Carolina, 16 May 1952; Transferred to the Military Sea Transportation Service, 14 September 1957

United States
- Name: William Patterson
- Owner: Military Sea Transportation Service
- Operator: Lykes Brothers Steamship Co., Inc.
- Cost: $1,857,999 (refit cost)
- Acquired: 14 September 1957
- In service: 14 September 1957
- Out of service: 23 March 1961
- Fate: Laid up in the Hudson River Reserve Fleet, Jones Point, New York, 23 March 1961; Sold for scrapping, 23 November 1970, withdrawn from fleet, 1 January 1971

General characteristics
- Class & type: Liberty ship; type EC2-S-C1, standard
- Type: EC2-G-8g (1955-) (refit)
- Tonnage: 10,865 LT DWT; 7,176 GRT
- Displacement: 3,380 long tons (3,434 t) (light); 14,245 long tons (14,474 t) (max)
- Length: 441 ft 6 in (134.57 m) oa; 467 ft 3 in (142.42 m) oa (refit)
- Beam: 57 feet (17 m)
- Draft: 27 ft 9.25 in (8.4646 m)
- Installed power: 2 × Oil fired 450 °F (232 °C) boilers, operating at 220 psi (1,500 kPa) (removed in refit); 2,500 hp (1,900 kW); 6 × Cleveland Diesel Engine Division gas generators (refit); 2 × Gas turbines; 6,000 hp (4,500 kW) (refit)
- Propulsion: 1 × triple-expansion steam engine, (manufactured by Worthington Pump & Machinery Corp, Harrison, New Jersey) (removed in refit); 1 × Geared reduction drive (refit); 1 × screw propeller
- Speed: 11.5 knots (21.3 km/h; 13.2 mph); 15.4 kn (28.5 km/h; 17.7 mph) (refit trial)
- Capacity: 562,608 cubic feet (15,931 m^{3}) (grain); 499,573 cubic feet (14,146 m^{3}) (bale)
- Complement: 38–62 USMM; 21–40 USNAG
- Armament: Varied by ship; Bow-mounted 3-inch (76 mm)/50-caliber gun; Stern-mounted 4-inch (102 mm)/50-caliber gun; 2–8 × single 20-millimeter (0.79 in) Oerlikon anti-aircraft (AA) cannons and/or, 2–8 × 37-millimeter (1.46 in) M1 AA guns
- Notes: New cargo handling gear installed during refit

SS William Patterson was a Liberty ship built in the United States during World War II. She was named after William Patterson, a businessman, a gun-runner during the American Revolution, and a founder of the Baltimore and Ohio Railroad.

== Construction ==
William Patterson was laid down on 29 April 1942, under a Maritime Commission (MARCOM) contract, MCE hull 48, by the Bethlehem-Fairfield Shipyard, Baltimore, Maryland; she was sponsored by Miss Gladys Mitchell, the daughter of John Mitchell, the Baltimore representative of the US Salvage Association, and was launched on 26 June 1942.

== History ==
She was allocated to A.H. Bull & Co., Inc., on 13 July 1942.

On 23 September 1948, she was laid up in the Hudson River Reserve Fleet, Jones Point, New York. On 31 October 1949, she was withdrawn from the fleet to be loaded with grain. She returned loaded on 14 November 1949. On 2 March 1951, she was withdrawn from the fleet to have her load of grain unloaded. On 16 May 1952, she was laid up in the National Defense Reserve Fleet, Wilmington, North Carolina. On 14 September 1955, she was withdrawn from the fleet for test conversion to gas generator fed gas turbine power. Bethlehem Steel, in Baltimore, performed the conversion and she was reclassified EC2-G-8g. Her hull was lengthened at the bow to 467 ft 3 in (142.42 m), and six new Cleveland Diesel Engine Division free piston gas generators, producing 1,200 hp (890 kW) each, and two reversible 3,000 shp (2,200 kW) gas turbines, connected directly to the ship's propeller through double reduction gear, were installed. The free piston generators provided moderate pressure gas which fed the gas turbines. At trials she ran 15.4 kn (28.5 km/h; 17.7 mph), above the requested 15 kn (28 km/h; 17 mph).

After conversion she was transferred to the Military Sea Transportation Service. She was operated by Lykes Brothers Steamship Co., Inc. under a bareboat charter.

On 23 March 1961, she was laid up in the Hudson River Reserve Fleet, Jones Point, New York. She was sold for scrapping on 23 November 1970, to Hierros Ardes, SA., along with three other ships, for $267,070. She was removed from the fleet, 17 January 1971.

== Bibliography ==
- "Bethlehem-Fairfield, Baltimore MD". www.ShipbuildingHistory.com. 14 August 2008.
- Maritime Administration. "William Patterson". Ship History Database Vessel Status Card. U.S. Department of Transportation, Maritime Administration.
- Davies, James (May 2004). "Specifications (As-Built)" (PDF). p. 23.
- "SS William Patterson".
- "Liberty ship conversion and engine improvement program : cumulative report of progress as of November 1, 1957". 1 November 1957.
