= USS Jean =

Cargo ship of the United States Navy

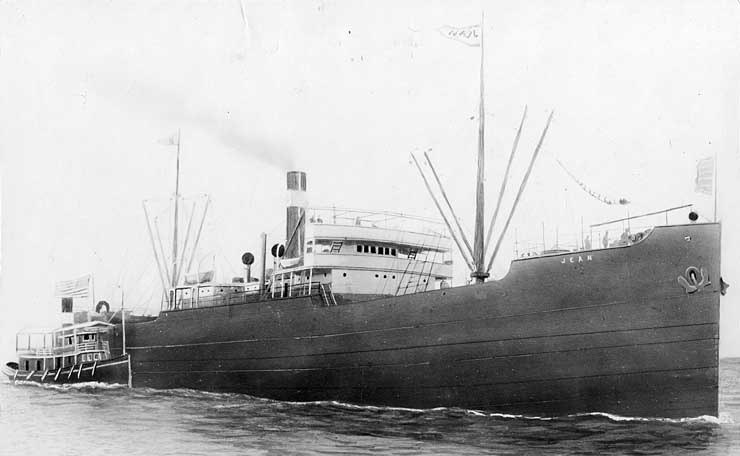
- SS Jean at Newport News, Virginia, probably at the time of her completion in 1909.

History

United States
- Name: USS Jean
- Namesake: Previous name retained
- Builder: Newport News Shipbuilding and Drydock Company, Newport News, Virginia
- Launched: 19 June 1909
- Completed: 1909
- Acquired: 30 August 1918
- Commissioned: 30 August 1918
- Decommissioned: 15 April 1919
- Fate: Transferred to United States Shipping Board and simultaneously returned to owners 15 April 1919
- Notes: In commercial service as SS Jean 1909–1917; In U.S. Army service 1917–1918; In commercial service as SS Jean 1919–1926; SS Margarita Calafati 1926–1927, SS Gladstone 1927–1928, SS Sports 1928–1941 (Latvian flag until 1940, Soviet flag 1940–1941), SS Magdalena (German flag) 1941–1947, and SS Sports again (British and Panamanian flags) 1947–1954; Scrapped 1954

General characteristics
- Type: Cargo ship
- Tonnage: 3,125 Gross register tons
- Displacement: 6,850 tons
- Length: 328 ft (100 m)
- Beam: 42 ft 6 in (12.95 m)
- Draft: 21 ft (6.4 m)
- Propulsion: Steam engine
- Speed: 10 knots
- Complement: 84
- Armament: 2 × 3-inch (76.2-millimeter) guns

USS Jean (ID-1308) was a cargo ship that served in the United States Navy from 1918 to 1919.

== Construction and service, 1909–1918 ==
Jean was built as the depot collier SS Jean in 1909 at Newport News, Virginia, by Newport News Shipbuilding and Drydock Company. The United States Army took control of her at Newport News in September 1917 for World War I service under a bareboat charter from her owner, A. H. Bull Steamship Company of New York City. She operated for the Army with a civilian crew, probably in European waters, before returning in August 1918 to Newport News, where she was transferred to the United States Shipping Board on a U.S. Army account.

== United States Navy service, 1918–1919 ==
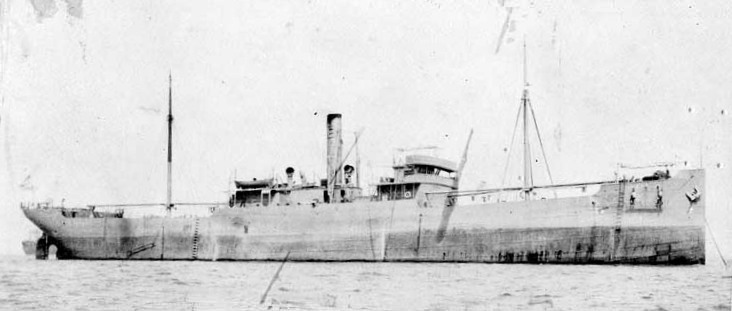
SS Jean, probably at the time of her 1917 inspection by the 3rd Naval District for possible U.S. Navy service.

The U.S. Navy had inspected Jean in 1917 for possible naval service, and acquired her from the Shipping Board for World War I service on 30 August 1918. Assigned Identification Number (Id. No.) 1308, she was commissioned the same day as USS Jean.

Assigned to the 5th Naval District under the control of the Naval Overseas Transportation Service, Jean operated on a bareboat charter from A. H. Bull Steamship Company. She took aboard 2,181 tons of general cargo at Norfolk, Virginia, and departed on 30 September 1918 for Sydney, Nova Scotia, Canada, to join an Atlantic convoy of American and British ships which departed 7 October 1918 for Bordeaux, France. She was diverted to Brest, France, where she arrived on 21 October 1918 with supplies for war-ravaged Europe. Steaming from Brest on 22 October 1918, Jean visited the ports of La Pallice, Bordeaux, and Le Verdon-sur-Mer. She sailed out of Verdon harbor on 3 November 1918 and arrived at Newport News on 24 November 1918. During this voyage, World War I ended on 11 November 1918.

Jean refueled, loaded 3,164 tons of cargo, and departed on 30 December 1918 for Rio de Janeiro, Brazil, via Barbados. She arrived at Rio de Janeiro on 27 January 1919, exchanged her cargo of coal for coffee beans, and departed for New York City via Santos, Brazil. She arrived at New York on 20 March 1919 and discharged her cargo.

Jean was decommissioned on 15 April 1919 at Hoboken, New Jersey. She was transferred to the Shipping Board that day for simultaneous return to the A. H. Bull Steamship Company.

== Later career, 1919–1954 ==
Jean returned to commercial service as SS Jean. She was renamed SS Margarita Calafati in 1926, SS Gladstone in 1927, and, under the Latvian flag, SS Sports in 1928. Sports came under Soviet control when the Soviet Union occupied Latvia in June 1940, and was nationalized and assigned to the Soviet Union's Latvian State Sea Shipping Company on 29 October 1940.

Sports was in port at Danzig, Germany, on 22 June 1941, the day that Germany declared war on the Soviet Union. Germany seized her that day and placed her under the German flag as SS Magdalena. After the end of World War II, Magdalena was transferred to the United Kingdom as a war reparation. Once again named SS Sports in 1947, the ship later was transferred to the Panamanian flag and remained in commercial service until scrapped in 1954.
