= USS Margaret (ID-2510) =

Cargo ship of the United States Navy

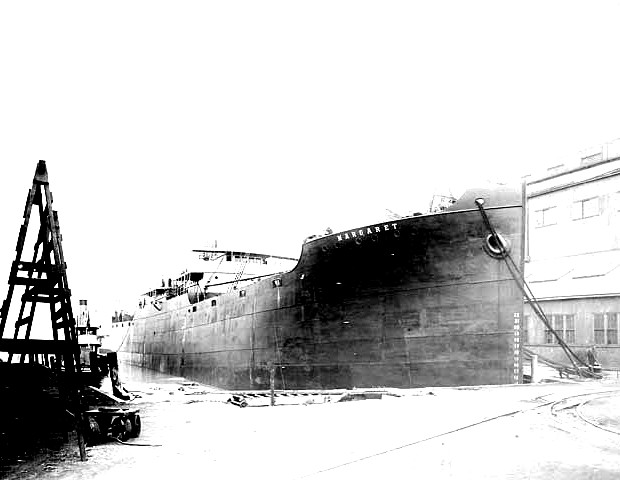
- SS Margaret (American freighter, 1916) photographed on 6 April 1916, around the time of the ship's completion at Sparrows Point, Maryland.

History

United States
- Name: USS Margaret, later named Chatham
- Namesake: Chatham: Counties in Georgia and North Carolina; many cities and towns in the United States.
- Owner: A.H. Bull Steamship Company of New York City
- Builder: Maryland Steel Co., Sparrows Point, Maryland
- Launched: 20 March 1916
- Acquired: by the Navy, 13 March 1918
- Commissioned: 26 March 1918 as USS Margaret (ID 2510)
- Decommissioned: 10 February 1919 at New York City
- Renamed: USS Chatham (ID-2510) on 18 April 1918
- Stricken: 1919 (est.)
- Fate: Transferred to the U.S. Shipping Board for return to her owners
- Notes: Sunk on 14 April 1942

General characteristics
- Type: Freighter
- Tonnage: 3,372 GRT
- Displacement: 7,523 tons
- Length: 338 ft (103 m)
- Beam: 46 ft 2 in (14.07 m)
- Draft: 22 ft (6.7 m)
- Speed: 11 knots (20 km/h; 13 mph)
- Complement: 70
- Armament: 1 × 5-inch gun; 1 × 3-inch gun

USS Margaret (ID-2510) – shortly thereafter known as USS Chatham (ID-2510) -- was a cargo ship acquired by the U.S. Navy during World War I. She was used to carry cargo to Allied troops in Europe until the war's end when she was returned to the U.S. Shipping Board for disposition.

== Leased in New York ==
Margaret, a 3,372 gross register tons (GRT) (7,523 tons displacement) freighter, was built at Sparrows Point, Maryland, in 1916. She was acquired on charter by the United States Navy from A. H. Bull Steamship Company, New York, New York, 13 March 1918. She was commissioned in the Navy at New York City, as USS Margaret (ID # 2510) on 25 March 1918.

Margaret was assigned to the 3rd Naval District under Naval Overseas Transportation Service and was renamed USS Chatham on 18 April 1918, probably to avoid confusion with several other U.S. Navy vessels of the same name, most notably the converted yacht Margaret (SP-527).

== World War I service ==
On the same date, the freighter arrived in the Gironde River in France at the end of her first transatlantic convoy voyage from New York carrying United States Army supplies for the American Expeditionary Force. Chatham made four more such trips, delivering French steel billets and supplies for the Motor Transportation Corps to Le Havre in June for the Army of Occupation, general cargo to Rochefort in August and October, and more general cargo to Brest in December.

== Post-service demobilization ==
Upon returning to New York in late December 1918, she entered a shipyard for a complete overhaul and was soon designated for demobilization. USS Chatham was decommissioned on 10 February 1919 and transferred to the U.S. Shipping Board.

== Subsequent maritime career ==
Chatham was returned to her owners, the A.H. Bull Steamship Company of New York City. Reverting to the name Margaret, the ship appears to have continued to serve her original owners until she was sunk, without survivors, by the German submarine German submarine U-571 (2) on 14 April 1942 off Cape Hatteras.
