= SS Robert R. Livingston =

Liberty ship built in the United States during World War II

History

United States
- Name: Robert R. Livingston
- Namesake: Robert R. Livingston
- Ordered: as type (EC2-S-C1) hull, MC hull 1516
- Builder: J.A. Jones Construction, Brunswick, Georgia
- Cost: $1,115,991
- Yard number: 132
- Way number: 4
- Laid down: 3 January 1944
- Launched: 21 February 1944
- Sponsored by: Mrs. Morton Funkhouser
- Completed: 29 February 1944
- Identification: Call Signal: KVYX
- Fate: Laid up in National Defense Reserve Fleet Astoria, Oregon, 27 November 1946; Sold for scrapping, 2 January 1972

General characteristics
- Class & type: Liberty ship; type EC2-S-C1, standard
- Tonnage: 10,865 LT DWT; 7,176 GRT
- Displacement: 3,380 long tons (3,434 t) (light); 14,245 long tons (14,474 t) (max)
- Length: 441 feet 6 inches (135 m) oa; 416 feet (127 m) pp; 427 feet (130 m) lwl
- Beam: 57 feet (17 m)
- Draft: 27 ft 9.25 in (8.4646 m)
- Installed power: 2 × Oil fired 450 °F (232 °C) boilers, operating at 220 psi (1,500 kPa); 2,500 hp (1,900 kW)
- Propulsion: 1 × triple-expansion steam engine, (manufactured by Filer and Stowell, Milwaukee, Wisconsin); 1 × screw propeller
- Speed: 11.5 knots (21.3 km/h; 13.2 mph)
- Capacity: 562,608 cubic feet (15,931 m^{3}) (grain); 499,573 cubic feet (14,146 m^{3}) (bale)
- Complement: 38–62 USMM; 21–40 USNAG
- Armament: Varied by ship; Bow-mounted 3-inch (76 mm)/50-caliber gun; Stern-mounted 4-inch (102 mm)/50-caliber gun; 2–8 × single 20-millimeter (0.79 in) Oerlikon anti-aircraft (AA) cannons and/or, 2–8 × 37-millimeter (1.46 in) M1 AA guns

SS Robert R. Livingston was a Liberty ship built in the United States during World War II. She was named after Robert R. Livingston, a Founding Father of the United States, a member of the Committee of Five that drafted the Declaration of Independence, the 1st United States Secretary of Foreign Affairs, the 1st Chancellor of New York, and a Minister to France.

== Construction ==
Robert R. Livingston was laid down on 3 January 1944, under a United States Maritime Commission (MARCOM) contract, MC hull 1516, by J.A. Jones Construction, Brunswick, Georgia; she was sponsored by Mrs. Morton Funkhouser, daughter of James Addison Jones, and launched on 21 February 1944.

== History ==
She was allocated to the A.H. Bull Company, on 29 February 1944. On 27 November 1946, she was laid up in the National Defense Reserve Fleet in Astoria, Oregon. On 5 August 1954, she was withdrawn from the fleet to be loaded with grain under the "Grain Program 1954", she returned loaded with grain on 18 August 1954. She was again withdrawn from the fleet on 20 December 1959, to have the grain unloaded, she returned empty on 24 December 1959. On 2 January 1962, she was sold, along with two other ships, to Zidell Exploration, Inc., for $193,707.91, for scrapping. She was delivered on 10 January 1962.

== Bibliography ==
- "Jones Construction, Brunswick GA". ShipbuildingHistory.com. 13 October 2010.
- "Liberty Ships – World War II".
- Maritime Administration. "Robert R. Livingston". Ship History Database Vessel Status Card. U.S. Department of Transportation, Maritime Administration. Archived from the original on 12 December 2019.
- Davies, James (May 2004). "Specifications (As-Built)" (PDF). p. 23.
- "SS Robert R. Livingston".
