= SS William Rawle =

Liberty ship of WWII

History

United States
- Name: William Rawle
- Namesake: William Rawle
- Owner: War Shipping Administration (WSA)
- Operator: A. H. Bull Steamship Company
- Ordered: as type (EC2-S-C1) hull, MCE hull 61
- Awarded: 14 March 1941
- Builder: Bethlehem-Fairfield Shipyard, Baltimore, Maryland
- Cost: $1,079,098
- Yard number: 2048
- Way number: 9
- Laid down: 28 June 1942
- Launched: 19 August 1942
- Sponsored by: Mrs. Grace Tully
- Completed: 29 August 1942
- Identification: Call sign: KGGJ
- Fate: Sold for commercial use, 31 March 1947

United States
- Name: Arlyn
- Owner: Baltimore Insular Line
- Operator: A.H. Bull & Co., Inc.
- Fate: Grounded, Silver Bank, Dominican Republic, 6 June 1958, refloated and returned to San Juan, Puerto Rico. Sold for scrapping, October 1958

General characteristics
- Class & type: Liberty ship; type EC2-S-C1, standard
- Tonnage: 10,865 LT DWT; 7,176 GRT
- Displacement: 3,380 long tons (3,434 t) (light); 14,245 long tons (14,474 t) (max)
- Length: 441 feet 6 inches (135 m) oa; 416 feet (127 m) pp; 427 feet (130 m) lwl
- Beam: 57 feet (17 m)
- Draft: 27 ft 9.25 in (8.4646 m)
- Installed power: 2 × Oil fired 450 °F (232 °C) boilers, operating at 220 psi (1,500 kPa); 2,500 hp (1,900 kW)
- Propulsion: 1 × triple-expansion steam engine, (manufactured by Worthington Pump & Machinery Corp, Harrison, New Jersey); 1 × screw propeller
- Speed: 11.5 knots (21.3 km/h; 13.2 mph)
- Capacity: 562,608 cubic feet (15,931 m^{3}) (grain); 499,573 cubic feet (14,146 m^{3}) (bale)
- Complement: 38–62 USMM; 21–40 USNAG
- Armament: Varied by ship; Bow-mounted 3-inch (76 mm)/50-caliber gun; Stern-mounted 4-inch (102 mm)/50-caliber gun; 2–8 × single 20-millimeter (0.79 in) Oerlikon anti-aircraft (AA) cannons and/or, 2–8 × 37-millimeter (1.46 in) M1 AA guns

SS William Rawle was a Liberty ship built in the United States during World War II. She was named after William Rawle, an American lawyer in Philadelphia. Rawle was appointed as United States district attorney in Pennsylvania, in 1791. He was a founder and first president of the Historical Society of Pennsylvania, president of the Pennsylvania Abolition Society, and for 40 years a trustee of the University of Pennsylvania.

== Construction ==
William Rawle was laid down on 28 June 1942, under a Maritime Commission (MARCOM) contract, MCE hull 61, by the Bethlehem-Fairfield Shipyard, Baltimore, Maryland; sponsored by Mrs. Grace Tully, the private Secretary to President Roosevelt, and was launched on 19 August 1942.

== History ==
She was allocated to A. H. Bull Steamship Company, on 29 August 1942. On 31 March 1947, she was sold for commercial use to the Baltimore Insular Line, for $544,506. On 6 June 1958, she ran aground on the Silver Bank. She was refloated and returned to San Juan, Puerto Rico, where she was scrapped in October 1958.

== Bibliography ==
- "Bethlehem-Fairfield, Baltimore MD". www.ShipbuildingHistory.com. 14 August 2008.
- Maritime Administration. "William Rawle". Ship History Database Vessel Status Card. U.S. Department of Transportation, Maritime Administration.
- Davies, James (May 2004). "Specifications (As-Built)" (PDF). p. 23.
- "SS William Rawle".
