= USS Wheatland =

Cargo ship of the United States Navy

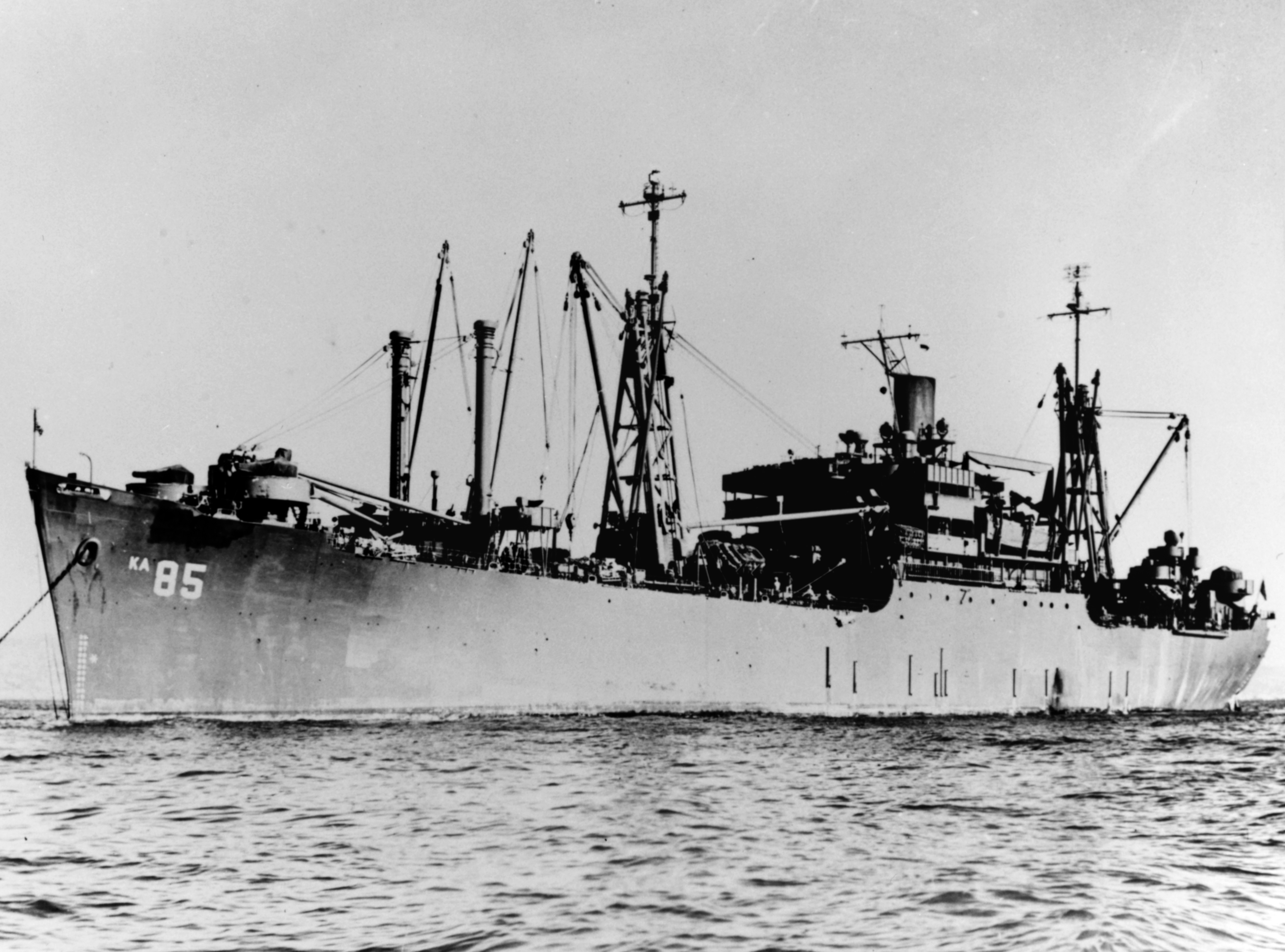

History

United States
- Name: USS Wheatland
- Namesake: Wheatland County, Montana
- Builder: North Carolina Shipbuilding Company, Wilmington, North Carolina
- Laid down: 17 July 1944
- Launched: 21 September 1944
- Commissioned: 3 April 1945
- Decommissioned: 25 April 1946
- Renamed: SS Beatrice; SS Bangor; SS Grand Loyalty
- Stricken: 8 May 1946
- Fate: Sold for merchant service, 3 April 1947; Scrapped at Taiwan, December 1973

General characteristics
- Class & type: Tolland-class attack cargo ship
- Displacement: 13,910 long tons (14,133 t) full
- Length: 459 ft 2 in (139.95 m)
- Beam: 63 ft (19 m)
- Draft: 26 ft 4 in (8.03 m)
- Speed: 16.5 knots (30.6 km/h; 19.0 mph)
- Complement: 395
- Armament: 1 × 5 in (127 mm)/38 caliber gun; 4 × twin 40 mm guns; 16 × 20 mm guns

USS Wheatland (AKA-85) was a Tolland-class attack cargo ship in service with the United States Navy from 1945 to 1946. She was sold into commercial service and was scrapped in 1973.

== History ==
Wheatland was named after Wheatland County, Montana. She was laid down as a Type C2-S-AJ3 ship on 17 July 1944 at Wilmington, North Carolina, by the North Carolina Shipbuilding Company under a Maritime Commission contract (MC hull 1397); launched on 21 September 1944; sponsored by Miss Shirley B. Anderson; transferred to the Navy on 6 October 1944; converted to an attack cargo ship in New York by the Atlantic Basin Iron Works; and commissioned on 3 April 1945.

=== World War II, 1945 ===
Commissioned two days after the beginning of the last amphibious operation of World War II, the Okinawa invasion, Wheatland never saw service in the role for which she had been converted. Instead of operating as an attack cargo ship during amphibious assaults, she spent her brief Navy career laboring as a conventional cargo ship and as a troop transport in support of the occupation of former Japanese possessions.

Following shakedown training and amphibious exercises at Hampton Roads, Virginia, and post-shakedown availability at the Norfolk Navy Yard, the ship departed the Chesapeake Bay on 7 May with 5,038 tons of dry cargo. Steaming in company with Begor, Cavallaro, Lee Fox, and John Q. Roberts, she set a course for Hawaii. Parting company with the high-speed transports at Panama, she transited the canal on 14 May and continued her voyage to Oahu independently. She arrived in Pearl Harbor on 28 May and immediately unloaded her cargo. The ship remained in the Hawaiian Islands for three weeks, during which she conducted a series of amphibious exercises at the island of Maui.

On 21 June, she departed Pearl Harbor with elements of the United States Army's IX Corps embarked. After stops at Eniwetok and Ulithi, she arrived at Leyte in the Philippine Islands on 7 July. There, she disembarked the troops and unloaded much of her cargo. On 9 July, she moved to Samar Island, where she discharged the remainder of her cargo. From there, she moved to the Palau Islands, departing Samar on 16 July and arriving at Angaur on 18 July. She spent the next two days loading a United States Marine Corps anti-aircraft unit and, on 21 July, got underway to return to Oahu.

After a brief stop at Eniwetok for fuel on 26 July, she arrived in Pearl Harbor on 1 August. She discharged her cargo and disembarked her passengers and then began an availability which lasted until 22 August.

=== Post-war activities, 1945–1946 ===
On 23 August, she moved to Hilo where she began embarking elements of the 5th Marine Division. She returned to Pearl Harbor on 27 August and remained there until 1 September when she got underway for Sasebo, Japan, in company with a 34-ship convoy. She made a three-day stop at Saipan along the way and arrived at Sasebo early on 22 September. She discharged her cargo over the next three days and departed Sasebo on 25 September.

Wheatland entered Subic Bay in the Philippines on 30 September and, the next afternoon, moved to Lingayen Gulf where she loaded men and equipment of the US Army's 32nd Division for transportation to Japan. On 9 October, she stood out of Lingayen Gulf on her way to Kyūshū, Japan. The attack cargo ship arrived in Sasebo early in the morning of 16 October and began disembarking the troops later in the day.

Returning to the United States via Okinawa and Guam, Wheatland arrived in Seattle, Washington, on 13 November. Later that month, she visited San Francisco for two weeks before embarking upon a voyage to the Marianas on 13 December. She arrived at Guam on 28 December and later visited Saipan whence she departed the Marianas on 22 January 1946. Steaming via the Panama Canal, the ship arrived in Norfolk, Virginia, on 21 February. She made one more voyage in her naval career – a round trip to New York and back to Norfolk between 28 February and 5 March – before beginning inactivation preparations at Norfolk.

=== Decommissioning and fate ===
Wheatland was placed out of commission at Norfolk on 25 April 1946, and custody was transferred to the Maritime Administration the next day and berthed with many of her sister ships in the reserve fleet, James River Group, at Lee Hall, Virginia. Her name was struck from the Navy List on 8 May 1946.

Ex-USS Wheatland was sold on 3 April 1947 to A. H. Bull Steamship Company of New York, New York and renamed SS Beatrice. Seized by the US Marshals Service, she was sold at auction on 13 March 1964 to First Ship & Steel Corp who in turn re-sold her to Bermuda Shipping Corp on 15 April 1964. Bermuda renamed her SS Bangor and leased her out for operations by the Waterman Steamship Corporation. On 8 December 1967, she was sold again to North East Shipping Corporation and renamed SS Grand Loyalty; the vessel was re-flagged Panamanian at this time as well. Sold for the final time in December 1973, the ship was broken up for scrap in Kaohsiung, Taiwan.
