= Union Minerals and Alloys Corporation =

Ship breaking operation

- Industry: Ship breaking

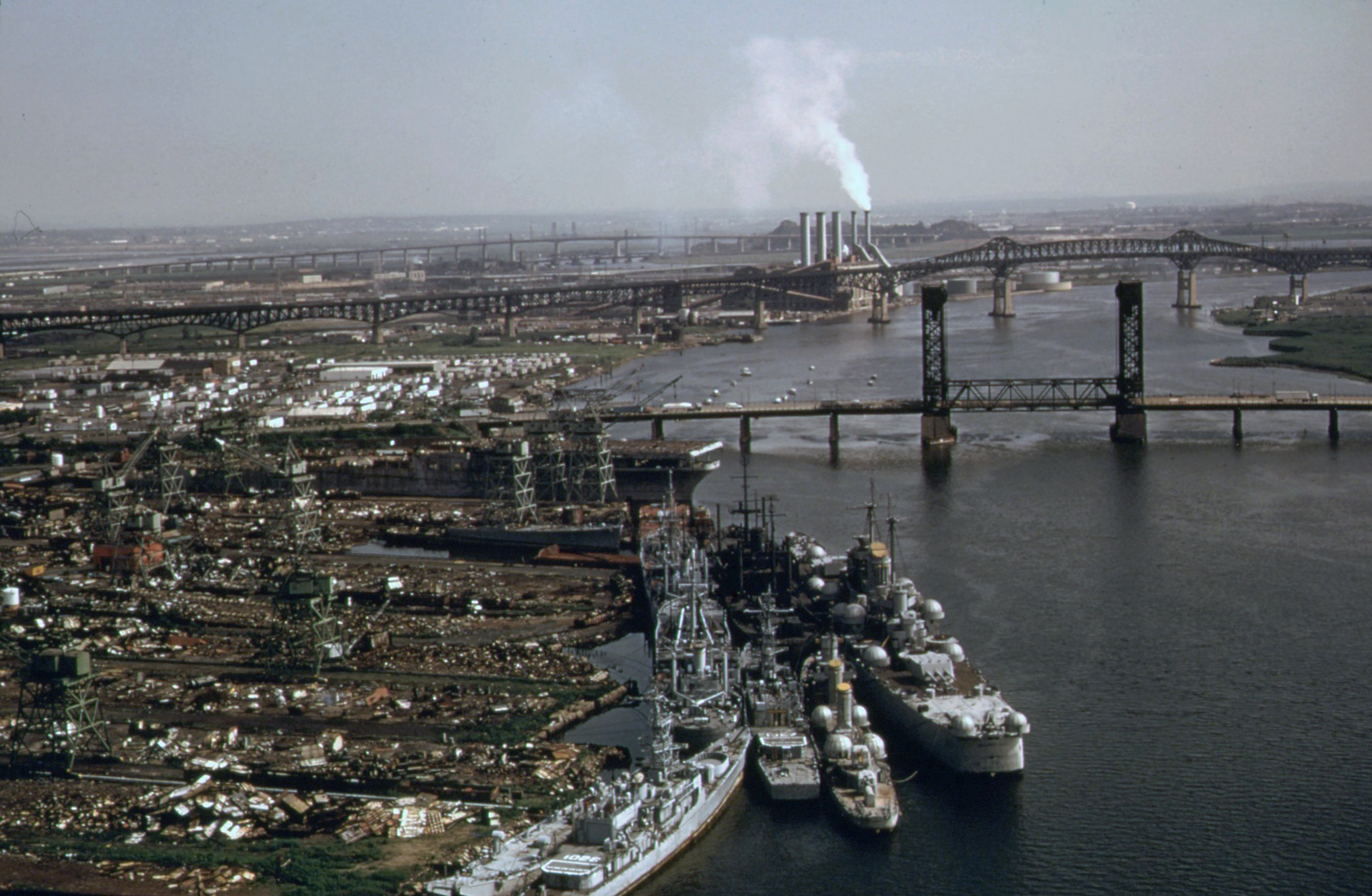
Around 1974, ex-Hooper and ex-Oregon City are identifiable in a group of ships awaiting scrapping by Union Minerals and Alloys Corporation at the site of the former Federal Shipbuilding and Drydock Company, Kearny, New Jersey.

Union Minerals and Alloys Corporation was a United States corporation that ran a shipbreaking operation. In the 1960s and 1970s, it purchased many surplus U.S. Navy and U.S. Merchant Marine ships from World War II from the United States Maritime Administration for scrapping.

The company scrapped USS Siboney, an escort carrier; the seaplane tender USS Kenneth Whiting; and the aircraft carriers USS Antietam and USS Wasp.

The company purchased the submarine USS Sablefish (SS-303) on 29 July 1971 for scrapping.

== See also ==
- Reserve fleet
