= Action of 27 March 1942 =

Naval battle during the Second World War

- Part of the Battle of the Atlantic of World War II
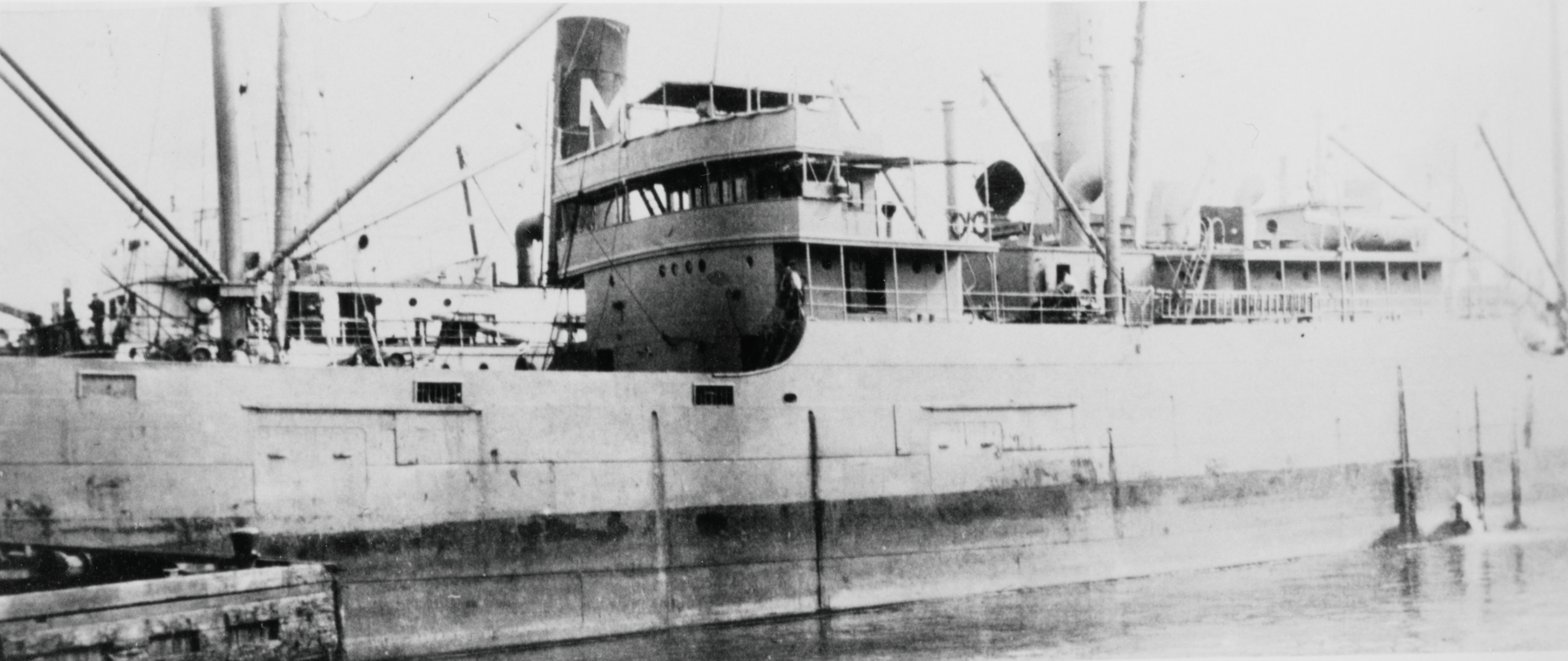
- USS Atik, seen here as SS Carolyn
Date	27 March 1942
Location	Off Norfolk, Atlantic Ocean 35.63°N 70.23°W
Result	German victory

Belligerents
Germany	United States

Commanders and leaders
Reinhard Hardegen	Harry Hicks †

Strength
Submarine U-123	Q-ship Atik

Casualties and losses
1 killed; U-123 damaged	141 killed; Atik sunk

The action of 27 March 1942 was a naval encounter between the United States and Germany during World War II in the Atlantic Ocean. While patrolling 300 nmi (560 km; 350 mi) off Norfolk, Virginia, an American Q-ship encountered a U-boat and a short surface engagement ensued.

== USS Atik ==
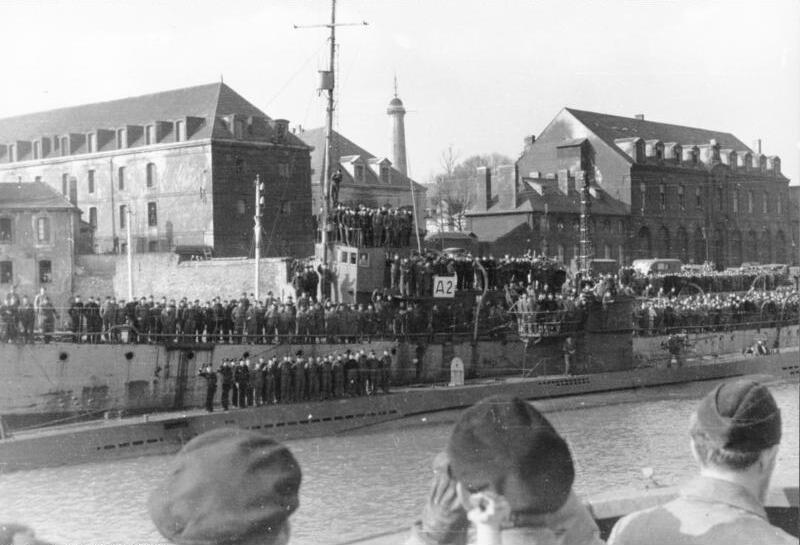
U-123 at Lorient in February 1942.

USS Atik (Lieutenant Commander Harry Lynnwood Hicks), was originally a merchantman named SS Carolyn which was converted to a Q-ship after America's entry into World War II. Atik displaced 6,610 tons with a crew of 141 men and an armament of four 4 in (100 mm) naval guns, eight machine guns and six K-guns.

== Action ==
It was about 5:00 p.m. on 27 March when U-123 detected Atik. At 7:37 p.m., on the surface, Kapitänleutnant Reinhard Hardegen fired a spread of G7e torpedoes and one of them struck Atik's bow on the port side. The Q-ship caught fire and took on a slight list. Hicks apparently decided that the only way to lure the U-boat within range of his guns was by ordering a lifeboat to be lowered on the starboard side. The trick worked and when U-123 was maneuvering to starboard, around Atik's stern, she opened fire with all of her weapons, including depth charges. The first shots fell short of the U-boat and the others deflected. The American machine gunners hit the U-boat's conning tower causing slight damage and a German midshipman was mortally wounded.

Immediately after the Americans opened fire, Hardegen ordered his deck gun into action and fled out of Atik's range before diving but at 9:29 p.m. U-123 attacked again to finish the Q-ship off. After hitting the ship with another torpedo, Atik remained afloat with her bow slowly settling. The remainder of the American crew appeared to be evacuating their ship at this point and U-123 surfaced at 10:27 p.m. to watch Atik sink. At 10:50 p.m. Atik exploded. A gale blew in and all of the 141 American sailors were lost. The one German casualty was buried at sea ten minutes later and then U-123 departed. An SOS had been received by three nearby American warships, Clemson-class destroyer USS Noa, Q-ship USS Asterion and fleet tug USS Sagamore but when they arrived there were no survivors, only wreckage. American aircraft searched for several days, finding nothing but debris and five empty lifeboats.

== See also ==
- Armed merchantmen
