= SS Gioacchino Lauro =

Two ships operated by Achille Lauro were named Gioacchino Lauro:

- SS Gioacchino Lauro (1920), in service 1932–40
- SS Gioacchino Lauro (1943), in service 1947–68
