= SS Empire Bruce =

World War II merchant ship of the United Kingdom

History
- Name: Empire Bruce
- Owner: Ministry of War Transport
- Operator: Larrinaga Steamship Co Ltd (1941-42); Christian Salvesen & Co Ltd (1942-43)
- Port of registry: (United Kingdom) Sunderland
- Builder: Sir J Laing & Sons Ltd, Sunderland
- Yard number: 737
- Launched: 11 June 1941
- Completed: August 1941
- Identification: UK Official Number 168918; Code Letters BCPJ (1941-48)
- Fate: Sunk, 18 April 1943

General characteristics
- Tonnage: 7,459 GRT; 4,497 NRT
- Length: 423 ft 8 in (129.13 m)
- Beam: 59 ft 9 in (18.21 m)
- Depth: 35 ft (10.67 m)
- Propulsion: 1 x triple expansion steam engine
- Speed: 10.5 knots (19.4 km/h)
- Crew: 42, plus 7 DEMS gunners.

Location of the sinking of Empire Bruce.

Empire Bruce was a prototype 7,459 GRT cargo ship which was built in 1941 by Sir J Laing & Sons for the Ministry of War Transport (MoWT). She was torpedoed and sunk by U-123 on 18 April 1943.

== Description ==
Empire Bruce was built by Sir J Laing & Sons Ltd, Sunderland. She was yard number 737. Launched on 11 June 1941, she was completed in August 1941.

The ship was 423 feet 8 inches (129.13 m) long, with a beam of 59 feet 9 inches (18.21 m) and a depth of 35 feet (10.67 m). She was propelled by a triple expansion steam engine which had cylinders of 24 inches (61 cm), 39 inches (99 cm) and 68 inches (170 cm) bore by 48 inches (120 cm) stroke. The engine was built by the Central Marine Engine Works, West Hartlepool. It could propel her at 10.5 knots (19.4 km/h). She had a GRT of 7,349 with a NRT of 4,497.

== Career ==
Empire Bruce's port of registry was Sunderland. She was initially operated under the management of the Larrinaga Steamship Co Ltd. Management was then transferred to Christian Salvesen & Co Ltd, Leith.

Empire Bruce was a member of a number of convoys during the Second World War.

ON 14

Convoy ON 14 departed Liverpool on 7 September 1941 and Loch Ewe on 10 September. It dispersed at sea on 15 September. Empire Bruce was bound for Philadelphia.

== Sinking ==
At 12:39 on 18 April 1943, Empire Bruce was struck in the stern by a torpedo fired from U-123, under the command of Oberleutnant zur See Horst von Schroeter. The ship was carrying a cargo of 9,141 tons of linseed from Buenos Aires, Argentina to the United Kingdom via Freetown, Sierra Leone. She capsized and sank after further torpedoes were fired at 13:51 and 14:19. The entire crew of 42, and seven DEMS gunners were rescued by minesweeper HMS MMS 107. They were landed at Freetown on 19 April. The ship sank 100 nautical miles (190 km) off Freetown (06°40′N 13°17′W).

== Official Numbers and Code Letters ==
Official Numbers were a forerunner to IMO Numbers. Empire Bruce had the UK Official Number 168918 and used the Code Letters BCPJ.
