= Karl-Heinz Moehle =

German U-boat commander

- Born: 31 July 1910; Norden, East Frisia, German Empire
- Died: 17 November 1996 (aged 86); Ahrensburg, Germany
- Military career
- Allegiance: Weimar Republic (to 1933); Nazi Germany
- Branch: Reichsmarine; Kriegsmarine
- Service years: April 1930 –
- Rank: Korvettenkapitän
- Units: 3rd U-boat Flotilla; 1st U-boat Flotilla; 2nd U-boat Flotilla; 5th U-boat Flotilla
- Commands: U-20, 1 October 1937 – 17 January 1940; U-123, 30 May 1940 – 19 May 1941
- Conflicts: World War II
- Awards: U-boat War Badge 1939; Knight's Cross; German Cross in Silver

Karl-Heinz Moehle (31 July 1910 – 17 November 1996) was a German U-boat commander of the Second World War. From September 1939 until retiring from front line service in June 1941, he sank 21 ships for a total of 93,197 gross register tons (GRT). For this he received the Knight's Cross of the Iron Cross (German: Ritterkreuz des Eisernen Kreuzes), among other commendations.

== Early life ==
Moehle was born on 31 July 1910 in Norden, East Frisia. He entered the navy in April 1930 at the age of 19 and spent his initial training aboard the school ship Schleswig-Holstein. He transferred to the U-boat force in March 1936 and by 1 June was promoted to Oberleutnant zur See. He took command of his first boat, U-20 on 1 October 1937 and commissioned her for sea. On 1 April 1939 he was promoted to Kapitänleutnant and on the outbreak of the Second World War, took U-20 on his first war cruise.

== Wartime career ==
Moehle made six patrols in U-20, operating in the North Sea. He sank eight allied ships. He left U-20 on 17 January 1940 and took command of U-123, which was to become one of the most famous U-boats of the war. He took command on 30 May 1940 and took her on her first patrol on 21 September. His first patrol sank six merchants, including four on 19 October from the ill-fated convoy SC 7. His second patrol was also highly successful, when on the morning of 23 November he attacked convoy OB 244 in the North Atlantic. He sank five ships over a period of five hours, for a combined total of 23,084 GRT. During these operations, U-123 collided with a sunken ship, sustaining damage that forced her to return to base after just 15 days at sea.

Moehle carried out another four patrols, sinking another five ships. On 24 October 1940 he received the Iron Cross 1st Class and on 26 February 1941 he was awarded the Knight's Cross of the Iron Cross. He stepped down as commander of U-123 on 19 May 1941, handing over command to Kptlt. Reinhard Hardegen, who would also go on to have success aboard her. Moehle became the commander of 5th U-boat Flotilla and was also appointed to command the U-boat base at Kiel from June 1941, a post he held until the end of the war. On 1 March 1943 he was promoted to Korvettenkapitän.

== Post war ==
After the surrender of Germany, Moehle was arrested. He was tried in late 1946 for passing on the Laconia Order to the U-boat commanders under his command. He was found guilty and sentenced to five years imprisonment, but was released in November 1949. Not much else is known about Moehle's life afterwards. Moehle died on 17 November 1996 at the age of 86.

== Awards ==
- Wehrmacht Long Service Award 4th Class (2 October 1936)
- Iron Cross (1939)
  - 2nd Class (23 September 1939)
  - 1st Class (24 October 1940)
- U-boat War Badge (1939) (17 October 1939)
- Knight's Cross of the Hungarian Order of Merit (19 December 1939)
- Sudetenland Medal (20 December 1939)
- Knight's Cross of the Iron Cross on 26 February 1941 as Kapitänleutnant and commander of U-123
- Italian War Cross for Military Valor with Swords (1 November 1941)
- German Cross in Silver (1 May 1945)
- War Merit Cross with Swords
  - 2nd Class (1 September 1944)
  - 1st Class (30 January 1945)
