= American Campaign Medal =

Military award of the US Armed Forces

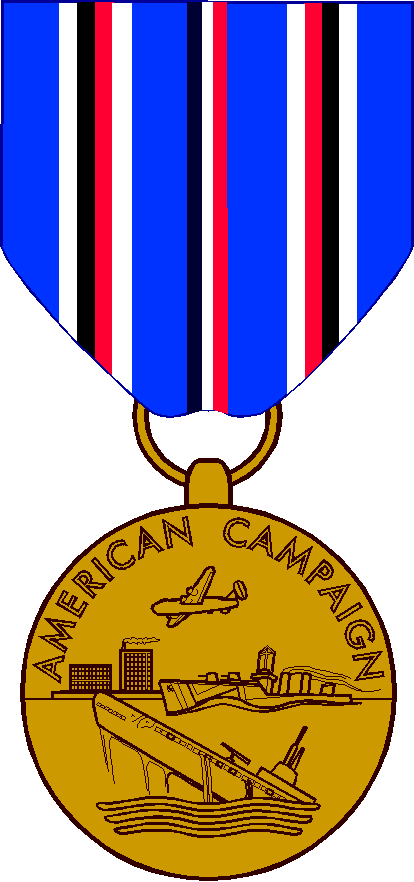
- Obverse
- Type: Military medal Campaign medal
- Presented by: Department of War and Department of the Navy
- Eligibility: U.S. military service in the American Theater for at least 30 days outside the U.S. or 1 year inside the U.S. between December 7, 1941, and March 2, 1946.
- Reverse
- Status: Inactive
- First award: December 7, 1941
- Final award: March 2, 1946
- Service ribbon and campaign streamer

Precedence
- Next (higher): American Defense Service Medal
- Equivalent: Asiatic-Pacific Campaign Medal; European-African-Middle Eastern Campaign Medal
- Next (lower): World War II Victory Medal

The American Campaign Medal was a military award of the United States Armed Forces which was first created on November 6, 1942, by Executive Order 9265 issued by President Franklin D. Roosevelt. The medal was intended to recognize those military members who had performed military service in the American Theater of Operations during World War II. A similar medal, known as the American Defense Service Medal was awarded for active duty service before the United States' entry into World War II.

== History ==
The American Campaign Medal was established per Executive Order 9265 on 6 November 1942, by President Franklin D. Roosevelt and announced in War Department Bulletin 56, 1942. The criteria were announced in Department of the Army (DA) Circular 1, dated 1 January 1943, so that the ribbon could be authorized prior to design of the medal. The criteria for the medal were announced in DA Circular 84, dated 25 March 1948 and subsequently published in Army Regulation 600–65, dated 22 September 1948. The American Campaign Medal was issued as a service ribbon only during the Second World War, and was not issued as a full-sized medal until 1947.

The first recipient of the American Campaign Medal was General of the Army George C. Marshall, Jr.

In January 2020, the United States Air Force retroactively authorized the American Campaign streamer to fly from the flag of the Civil Air Patrol located at CAP National Headquarters, Maxwell Air Force Base, Alabama. The streamer recognizes CAP's involvement in coastal patrol operations between May and August 1943 while attached to Army Air Forces Antisubmarine Command.

== Criteria ==
The requirements for the American Campaign Medal were for service within the American Theater between 7 December 1941 and 2 March 1946 under any of the following conditions:

1. On permanent assignment outside the continental limits of the United States.
2. Permanently assigned as a member of a crew of a vessel sailing ocean waters for a period of 30 consecutive days or 60 nonconsecutive days.
3. Outside the continental limits of the United States in a passenger status or on temporary duty for 30 consecutive days or 60 nonconsecutive days.
4. In active combat against the enemy and was awarded a combat decoration or furnished a certificate by the commanding general of a corps, higher unit, or independent force that the Soldier actually participated in combat.
5. Within the continental limits of the United States for an aggregate period of 1 year.

The boundaries of American Theater are as follows: The eastern boundary is located from the North Pole, south along the 75th meridian west longitude to the 77th parallel north latitude, thence southeast through Davis Strait to the intersection of the 40th parallel north latitude and the 35th meridian west longitude, thence south along the meridian to the 10th parallel north latitude, thence southeast to the intersection of the Equator and the 20th meridian west longitude, thence south along the 20th meridian west longitude to the South Pole.

The western boundary is located from the North Pole, south along the 141st meridian west longitude to the east boundary of Alaska, thence south and southeast along the Alaska boundary to the Pacific Ocean, thence south along the 130th meridian to its intersection with the 30th parallel north latitude, thence southeast to the intersection of the Equator and the 100th meridian west longitude, thence south to the South Pole.

== Appearance ==
The medal, made of bronze, is 1 1/4 inches (32 mm) inches wide. The obverse was designed by Thomas Hudson Jones. It shows a Navy cruiser underway with a B-24 Liberator bomber flying overhead. In the foreground is a sinking enemy submarine, and in the background is the skyline of a city. At the top of the medal are the words AMERICAN CAMPAIGN. The reverse of the medal, designed by Adolph Alexander Weinman, is the same design as used on the reverse of both the Asiatic-Pacific Campaign Medal and the European-African-Middle Eastern Campaign Medal. It depicts an American bald eagle between the dates 1941 – 1945 and the words UNITED STATES OF AMERICA.

The ribbon is 1 3/8 inches (35 mm) inches wide in oriental blue in the center is a 1/8 inch (3.2 mm) inch center stripe divided into thirds of old glory blue, white, and scarlet. Between the center and the edges are stripes of 1/16 inch (1.6 mm) inch in white, black, scarlet and white. The blue color represents the Americas; the central blue, white and red stripes, taken from the American Defense Service Medal ribbon, represents the continuance of American defense after Pearl Harbor. The white and black stripes represent the German part of the conflict on the Atlantic Coast, while the red and white stripes are for the Japanese colors and refer to that part of the conflict on the Pacific Coast.

== Ribbon devices ==
3/16 inch service stars were authorized to service members who participated in combat with Axis forces within the American Theater. This primarily applied to those service members whose units participated in anti-U-boat patrols (Anti-submarine warfare) in the Atlantic.

== Campaigns ==
=== Navy campaigns ===
Participation in these escort, antisubmarine, armed guard, and special operations entitle recipients to one campaign star for each participation:

Navy Campaigns

Name of campaign	Start Date	End Date
Convoy ON 67	21 February 1942	26 February 1942
USS Atik (AK-101) (antisubmarine operations)	27 March 1942	27 March 1942
USS Asterion (AK-100) (antisubmarine operations)	22 March 1942	31 January 1943
Task Group 21.13	12 July 1942	28 August 1942
Convoy TAG 18	1 November 1942	6 November 1942
Convoy SC 107	3 November 1942	8 November 1942
Task Group 21.14	27 July 1943	10 September 1943
Task Group 21.15	24 March 1944	11 May 1944
USS Frederick C. Davis (DE-136) (antisubmarine operations)	24 April 1945	24 April 1945
USS Atherton (DE-169) and USS Moberly (PF-63)	6 May 1945	6 May 1945

=== Army campaigns ===
A bronze service star is authorized for participation in the antisubmarine campaign. To qualify individuals must have been assigned to or attached to, and present for duty with, a unit with antisubmarine campaign credit. These campaigns are not displayed as streamers on the Army flag.

Army Campaigns
Name of campaign	Start Date	End Date
Antisubmarine	7 December 1941	2 September 1945
Ground Combat	7 December 1941	2 September 1945
Air Combat	7 December 1941	2 September 1945
