= SS Gulfamerica =

Coordinates: 30°14′N 81°18′W

- SS Gulfamerica sinks after being torpedoed

History

United States
- Name: Gulfamerica
- Operator: Gulf Oil Co, New York City
- Builder: Bethlehem-Fairfield Shipyards Inc, Sparrows Point, Maryland
- Launched: 23 February 1942
- Completed: March 1942
- Fate: Sunk on 11 April 1942

General characteristics
- Tonnage: 8,081 tons
- Length: 445 ft (136 m)
- Beam: 64 ft (20 m)
- Propulsion: 583 nhp; Steam turbine engine
- Capacity: 101,500 bbl (4,260,000 US gal; 16,140,000 L) of furnace oil
- Crew: 48

SS Gulfamerica was an American steam tanker built by Bethlehem-Fairfield Shipyards Inc. of Sparrow's Point, Maryland, completed in March 1942. She was operated by the Gulf Oil Company of New York City and homeported in Philadelphia.

== Sinking ==
Gulfamerica's maiden voyage was to take her from Port Arthur, Texas, to New York, carrying a cargo of 101,500 barrels (4,260,000 US gal; 16,140,000 L) of furnace oil. On the night of 10 April 1942, she was traveling unescorted about 5 miles (8.0 km) off Jacksonville, Florida. She was illuminated by the lights of the Jacksonville Beach resort, which at that time was not observing a blackout. Just after 10 pm, the decision was made to stop steaming an evasive zigzag course. Twenty minutes later, at 10:20, she was sighted by the German submarine U-123, which fired a torpedo at her.

The torpedo struck the #7 tank on the starboard side and caused a large explosion and subsequent fire. The engines were stopped, and the order to abandon ship was given, as Gulfamerica sent distress calls. U-123 then opened fire with her deck gun, firing about 12 shells into the engine room on the port side in an attempt to bring down the radio antenna and the anti-aircraft gun. The evacuation descended into confusion, causing a lifeboat to capsize, while another with the master and ten crewmen hurriedly pulled away in ten minutes. Ten minutes later, another boat left with only three men aboard, while three others abandoned ship on a life raft, later picking up two men from the water.

Five men were killed by the torpedo blast or the gunfire, with 14 men drowning after they had entered the water. A total of two officers, two armed guards and 15 crewmen were killed in the sinking. The survivors were all rescued by US Coast Guard patrol boats and taken to Mayport, Florida. Gulfamerica settled by the stern with about a 40° list to starboard but did not sink until 16 April.

== Humane considerations ==
After the initial torpedo strike, the commander of U-123, Kapitänleutnant Reinhard Hardegen, surfaced his boat to finish the stricken tanker. In doing so, he realised that they were close to the highly illuminated and populated coast of Jacksonville, and that there was the risk that if he fired, shots that flew over Gulfamerica could hit the shore, putting civilian lives at risk. He therefore navigated around Gulfamerica, placing himself between the shore and the tanker, and ensuring that shots that missed would land in the sea. In doing so, he lost valuable time. The distress call was received, and U-123 was later engaged by the destroyer USS Dahlgren. U-123 was damaged but made a narrow escape back to Europe.

Hardegen survived the war and returned to Jacksonville in 1990, where he was received as an honored guest. He would say of the occasion, "The town was very friendly to me."

== Aftermath ==
The sinking of Gulfamerica resulted in several losses to merchant vessels along the North American coast. A wave of hysteria developed, with a fear of spies and saboteurs being landed all along the coast. Despite the highly illuminated coastline providing easy targets for the U-boats engaged in Operation Drumbeat, it still took several months for the government to organize an effective blackout, after which losses dropped. Hardegen spoke of that night, "There was moonshine, how you say, moonlight. There were lights on the shore. And many people."

The Liberty ship SS Michael James Monahan was named after a crewman lost aboard Gulfamerica. The Liberty ships SS Robert J. Banks and SS James Kyron Walker were also named after crewmen lost aboard Gulfamerica. They were two of only 17 Liberty ships named after African-Americans during the war.
