= USS Asterion (AK-100) =

American Q-ship

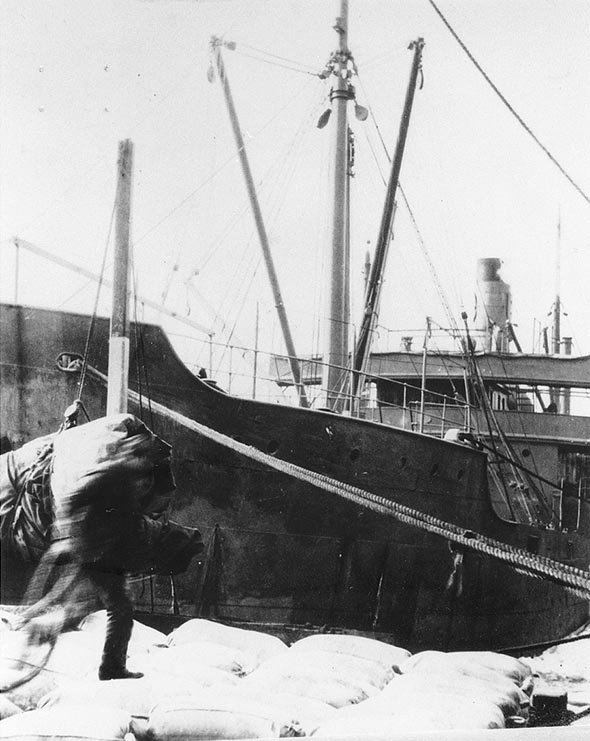
- The only surviving US Navy photo of the Evelyn/Asterion

History

United States
- Laid down: 17 January 1912
- Launched: 9 May 1912
- Commissioned: March 1942
- Decommissioned: 22 January 1944
- Fate: Transferred to Coast Guard, then scrapped in 1946

General characteristics
- Displacement: 6610 tons
- Length: 382 ft 2 in (116.48 m)
- Beam: 46 ft 1 in (14.05 m)
- Draft: 21 ft 6 in (6.55 m)
- Speed: 10 knots
- Complement: 141 officers and enlisted
- Armament: 4 x 4-inch guns; 4 x .50-caliber machine guns; 4 x .30 cal. Lewis machine guns; 6 x depth charge projectors

USS Asterion (AK-100, AK-63, WAK-123) was a Q-ship of the United States Navy named for Asterion, a star in the constellation Canes Venatici.

== Civilian merchant ship ==
SS Evelyn, a steel-hulled, single-screw steamer, was laid down on 17 January 1912, by the Newport News Shipbuilding and Dry Dock Company, launched on 9 May 1912; and delivered to the A. H. Bull Steamship Lines on 11 June 1912.

For the next 30 years, Evelyn operated between ports on the eastern seaboard of the United States and the West Indies, carrying passengers and freight. During World War I, she was inspected in the 3d Naval District on 9 January 1918, for possible naval service and was assigned the identification number Id. No. 2228. However, she was not actually taken over. Remaining a merchantman, she received a Navy armed guard detachment who protected her between 31 January and 11 November 1918.

== World War II ==
=== Q-ship ===
Evelyn pursued her prosaic calling under the house flag of the Bull Line through the Japanese attack on Pearl Harbor. In a dispatch dated 31 January 1942, the Chief of Naval Operations ordered that Evelyn and Carolyn "be given a preliminary conversion to AK (cargo ship) in the shortest possible time." A 12 February letter from the Chief of the Bureau of Ships made it known that the conversion and outfitting of the vessels was desired "by 1 March 1942."

Acquired by the navy from the Bull Line early in 1942, Evelyn was renamed Asterion and classified as the cargo ship AK-100. That designation, however, was strictly a cover, for Asterion, like her sister ship USS Atik (the former SS Carolyn) was in fact a Q-ship. While this ruse de guerre had worked moderately well in World War I, it was at best a stop-gap measure adopted in the hope of ending a rash of sinkings of merchantmen in American coastal waters. Given a main battery, machine guns and depth charge gear hidden in concealed positions, Asterion was placed in commission at the Portsmouth Navy Yard in early March 1942. While on patrol, she would answer friendly requests for identification as the SS Evelyn, but if enemy ships should challenge, she would reply as SS Generalife of Spanish registry, callsign EAOQ.

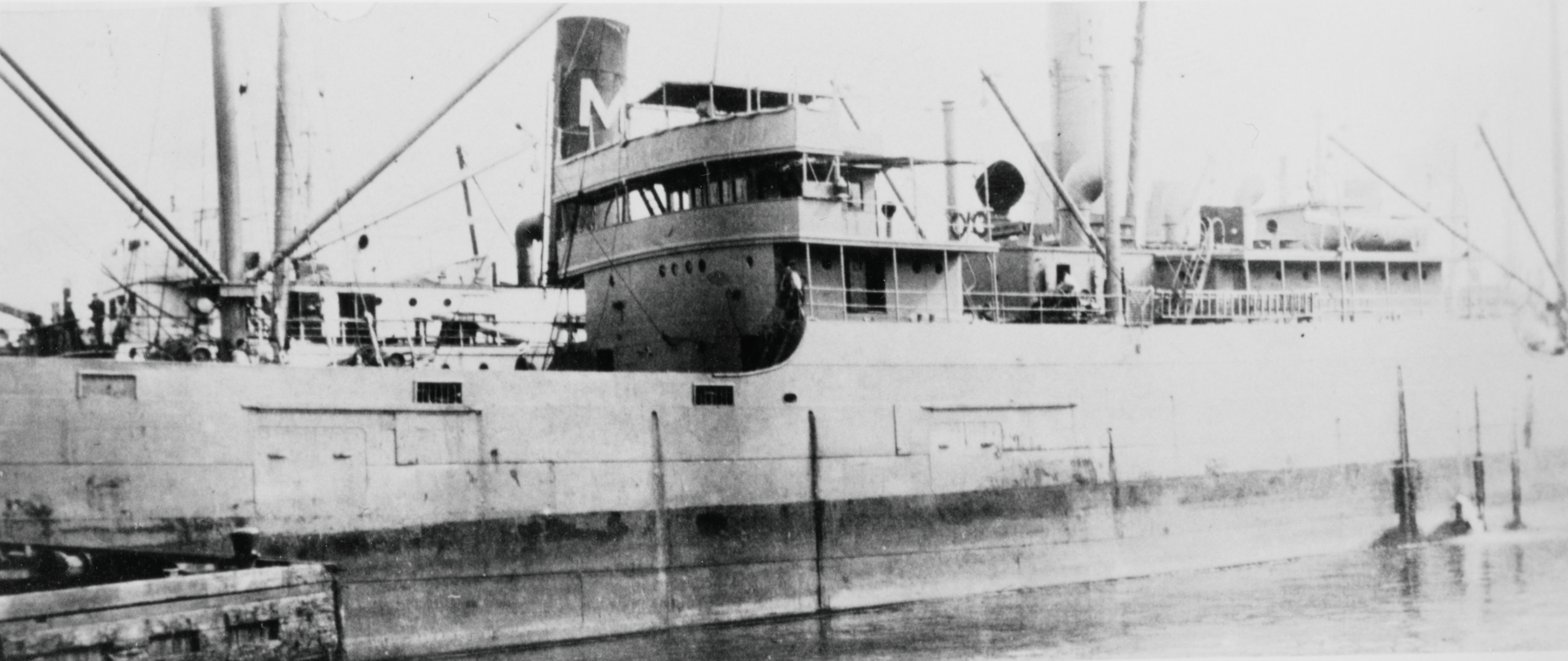
AK-101 aka USS Atik, sister ship of the USS Asterion

After brief sea trials, Asterion sailed for her assigned patrol area on 23 March 1942, in company of Atik. Each ship was to proceed independently under the guise of a tramp steamer, in the hope of luring a U-boat to the surface and destroying the submarine with gunfire before she realized what was happening. Once out at sea, the two vessels parted company.

One day out, Asterion picked up a submarine contact on her underwater detection gear. Two days later, however, her radios picked up ominous traffic. Atik had been torpedoed. Then, after luring her assailant, U-123, to the surface with her "tramp" steamer guise, Atik had fired on the U-boat, but succeeded only in mortally wounding an officer on the submarine's bridge before the German captain broke off the action and cleared the area to await nightfall and a second crack at the Q-ship. U-123 delivered the coup de grâce that evening, and Atik exploded and sank. Asterion plodded immediately to the assistance of Atik, but, when she arrived on the scene, found only wreckage. Not a man in Atik's crew had survived. Asterion arrived at Norfolk, Virginia, on 31 March 1942.

She set out for her second cruise on 4 April, and that afternoon, witnessed the torpedoing of the tanker SS Comol Rio by U-154. A destroyer arrived on the scene shortly thereafter and took up the search after Asterion had picked up a sound contact.

Various contacts with friendly surface craft and aircraft on this patrol and the previous one led to awkward situations which required tact and ingenuity on the part of the commanding officer to preserve the Q-ship's cover story. That cover story was maintained; officers in Headquarters, Eastern Sea Frontier, were so completely unaware of the nature of this ship's mission that they recorded her various dispatches in the Enemy Action Diary for 4, 10 and 14 April under her commercial name, SS Evelyn.

Operating off Cape Hatteras, North Carolina, on 14 April, Asterion rescued the 55 men of the crew of a British merchantman that had been torpedoed earlier—saving even the captain's dog. She entered New York harbor on 18 April and there disembarked the sailors she had rescued, cautioning them not to tell anyone of what they had seen on board the Q-ship.

Asterion's third cruise commenced on 4 May 1942, from New York, and she sailed between Key West and Norfolk, proceeding as an independently routed merchantman or as a straggler from a convoy. The fourth cruise commenced on 7 June 1942, and, due to increased submarine activity in the Gulf of Mexico, the Q-ship set course for those dangerous waters. Clearing New York, she sailed down the eastern seaboard, transited the Straits of Florida on 11 June, passed the Dry Tortugas on 14 June; and thence steamed to the Yucatán Channel. Reversing course, she moved to the Mississippi River Delta whence she continued on a westerly course toward Galveston, Texas. She then returned to New York on 6 July.

Departing New York a fortnight later, Asterion went directly to Key West and then sailed north of the Bahamas to the Windward Passage. Returning to New York on 18 August, Asterion sailed at the end of the month for her sixth cruise, which took her through the waters that she had traversed on the fifth patrol. On 25 September 1942, she was redesignated AK-63. Commencing her seventh cruise on 18 November, the ship proceeded to Key West and, while there, carried out training exercises on 30 November with a friendly submarine.

On 2 December 1942, Asterion got underway for the British West Indies and, going via the Old Bahama Channel, followed the convoy route to Trinidad and Tobago, patrolling to the westward of Aruba, in the Dutch West Indies. Departing Trinidad on the day after Christmas the ship headed home and arrived at New York on 10 January 1943.

Over the next few months, Asterion underwent an extensive overhaul, involving the strengthening of her whole structure and modification of her armament. Inspection after her sixth cruise raised considerable doubt as to her ability to remain afloat if hit by even a single torpedo because she had three large holds. A representative of the New York Navy Yard conferred with the Bureau of Ships, Damage Section, who confirmed the opinion that she could not successfully withstand a torpedo hit, and that such a hit would result not only in her eventual sinking but also in such a quick list that her battery would be ineffective. (This weakness almost certainly was responsible for the rapid sinking of Atik.) A conference held in the office of the Vice Chief of Naval Operations decided to increase flotation by building five transverse bulkheads. It was estimated that this would take three months and that it would cost about US$200,000. The work took much longer and cost much more than estimated. Not until 27 September was the overhaul completed—more than eight months after the end of Asterion's latest cruise. The overhaul included re-subdivision by longitudinal and athwart ship bulkheads, and the filling of her holds with 16,772 empty steel flotation drums. The Supervising Constructor estimated that the vessel could be completely flooded and 25% of the barrels completely crushed before her well decks would be awash. Thus it seemed probable that she had an excellent chance of remaining afloat if a U-boat made a successful attack on her.

Asterion then steamed to New London, Connecticut, and beginning on 4 September, operated with American submarines in training. After returning briefly to New York, from 18 to 20 September, she resumed her training at New London before proceeding back to New York for post-shakedown availability.

=== Coast Guard service ===
On 14 October 1943, Admiral King decided that, since the Q-ship effort had achieved nothing, Asterion should be assigned to other duties. On 16 December 1943, the venerable auxiliary was ordered to proceed to Boston, Massachusetts, where she reported to the Commandant, 1st Naval District, for transfer to the United States Coast Guard.

Turned over to that service and commissioned by it at Boston on 12 January 1944, Asterion (given the designation WAK-123) was converted for service as a weather ship. Ten days later, on 22 January 1944, her name was struck from the Naval Vessel Register. Based at Boston, Asterion served as a weather patrol ship on Atlantic stations 3 and 4.

=== Scrapping ===
She was decommissioned on 20 July 1944, because of "age, condition of hull and machinery, and lack of speed." Turned over to the War Shipping Administration for disposal in April 1946, Asterion was sold to the Boston Metals Company on 10 September 1946, and was subsequently scrapped.

== Awards ==
- American Campaign Medal with one battle star
- World War II Victory Medal

== Bibliography ==
- Beyer, Edward F. & Beyer, Kenneth M. (1991). "U. S. Navy Mystery Ships". Warship International. XXVIII (4). International Naval Research Organization: 322–372. ISSN 0043-0374.
- Q-Ships Versus U-Boats, by Kenneth M. Beyer. U.S. Naval Institute Press, May 1999. Beyer, who served as an officer on Asterion, recounts the story of Astarion and Atik.
