= Horst von Schroeter =

German U-boat commander

- Born: 10 June 1919
- Died: 25 July 2006 (aged 87)
- Military career
- Allegiance: Nazi Germany; West Germany
- Branch: Kriegsmarine; German Navy
- Rank: Kapitänleutnant; Vizeadmiral
- Commands: U-123; U-2506; Allied Forces Baltic Approaches
- Conflicts: Battle of the Atlantic
- Awards: Knight's Cross of the Iron Cross

Horst von Schroeter (10 June 1919, Bieberstein – 25 July 2006) was a German U-boat commander during World War II. He was a recipient of the Knight's Cross of the Iron Cross of Nazi Germany. After World War II he joined the West German Navy and from 1976 to 1979 held the position of Commander of the NATO Naval forces in the Baltic Sea Approaches (COMNAVBALTAP).

U-123 sank the Spanish-registered motor ship Castillo Montealegre on 8 April 1943 west of Conakry, French Guinea. As per maritime rules, the neutral ship had the Spanish flag painted in both sides. Commander Horst von Schroeter ordered the shooting of 3 torpedoes and she sunk in less than a minute. The submarine surfaced, the commander asked from the conning tower "What ship?" to the survivors. Although being confirmed he had just sunk a neutral ship, he left without giving any assistance to the 40 men adrift (five went down with the ship).

A few days later the Hill-class naval trawler HMS Inkpen rescued 29 survivors from a boat. 11 on a separated raft died. The affair was hushed-up by the government of Franco; indeed, the survivors were ordered to shut-up. The career of Commander Horst von Schroeter was unaffected by this affair and after the war he even became a NATO commander.

== Awards ==
- Iron Cross (1939) 2nd and 1st Class
  - 2nd Class (25 August 1941)
  - 1st Class (10 February 1942)
- U-boat War Badge (25 August 1941)
- German Cross in Gold (12 December 1943)
- Knight's Cross of the Iron Cross on 1 June 1944 as Oberleutnant zur See and Commandant of U-123
- U-boat Front Clasp in Bronze and Silver
  - Bronze (14 October 1944)
  - Silver (15 March 1945)
- Order of Merit of the Federal Republic of Germany
  - Cross of Merit (4 September 1971)
  - Cross of Merit 1st Class (4 September 1972)
  - Great Cross of Merit (30 September 1979)

Military offices
Preceded by Konteradmiral Heinz Kühnle	Deputy Inspector of the Navy; October 1971 – September 1976	Succeeded by Konteradmiral Ansgar Bethge
