= SS Empire Engineer =

Refrigerated cargo ship

History
- Name: Canadian Commander (1920–32); Gioacchino Lauro (1932–40); Empire Engineer (1940–41)
- Owner: Canadian Government (1920–28); Canadian Commander Ltd (1928–32); Achille Lauro (1932–40); Ministry of War Transport (1940–41)
- Operator: Canadian Government Merchant Marine Ltd (1921–28); Canadian National Steamships Ltd (1928–32); Achille Lauro (1932–40); Waldner, Hopkins & Co Ltd (1940–41)
- Port of registry: (United Kingdom) Montreal (1921–32); (Kingdom of Italy) Naples (1932–40); (United Kingdom) London (1940–41)
- Builder: Canadian Vickers Ltd., Montreal
- Yard number: 79
- Launched: 1920
- Completed: April 1921
- Out of service: 4 February 1941
- Identification: United Kingdom Official Number 141832 (1920–32, 1940–41); Italian Official Number 383 (1932–40); Code Letters TQDW (1921–32); Code Letters IBOG (1934–40); Code Letters GLYG (1940–41)
- Fate: Torpedoed and sunk, 4 February 1941

General characteristics
- Type: Cargo ship
- Tonnage: 5,358 GRT (1921–32, 1940-41); 5,345 GRT (1932-41); 3,347 NRT (1921–32); 3,151 NRT (1932–40); 3,230 NRT (1940–41); 8,400 DWT
- Length: 400 ft 0 in (121.92 m)
- Beam: 52 ft 4 in (15.95 m)
- Draught: 25 ft 4 in (7.72 m)
- Depth: 34 ft 8 in (10.57 m)
- Installed power: 520 nhp
- Propulsion: Triple expansion steam engine driving a single screw propeller
- Capacity: 10,265 cubic feet (290.7 m^{3}) refrigerated cargo space
- Crew: 39 (Empire Engineer)

Location where Empire Engineer was torpedoed and sunk.

Empire Engineer was a 5,358 GRT refrigerated cargo ship that was built in 1921 as Canadian Commander by Canadian Vickers Ltd, Montreal, Quebec, Canada. She was sold to an Italian firm in 1932 and renamed Giaocchino Lauro. She was seized by the United Kingdom in 1940, passed to the Ministry of War Transport (MoWT) and renamed Empire Engineer. She served until 4 February 1941 when she was torpedoed and sunk by U-123.

== Description ==
The SS Empire Engineer was built in 1920 by Canadian Vickers Ltd, Montreal. She was yard number 79.

The ship was 400 feet 0 inches (121.92 m) long, with a beam of 52 feet 4 inches (15.95 m). She had a depth of 28 feet 5 inches (8.66 m), and a draught of 25 feet 4 inches (7.72 m). She was assessed at 6,570 GRT, 4,005 NRT. 8,400 DWT.

The ship was propelled by a 520 nhp triple expansion steam engine, which had cylinders of 27 inches (69 cm), 44 inches (110 cm) and 73 inches (190 cm) diameter by 48 inches (120 cm) stroke. The engine was built by Canadian Vickers Ltd, Montreal. She had 10,325 cubic feet (292.4 m^{3}) of refrigerated cargo space. Refrigeration machinery was by the Lightfoot Refrigeration Co Ltd.

== History ==
Canadian Commander was launched in 1920, with completion in April 1921. She was built for the Canadian Government and operated by the Canadian Government Merchant Marine Ltd (GCMM). Her port of registry was Montreal, under the British flag. The United Kingdom Official Number 141832 and Code Letters TQDW were allocated. On 3 July 1922, Canadian Commander ran aground at Saint Pierre and Miquelon. She was refloated on 16 July. Following the demise of CGMM in 1928, Canadian Commander was transferred to Canadian Commander Ltd and placed under the management of Canadian National Steamships Ltd.

In 1932, Canadian Commander was sold to Achille Lauro, Naples, Italy and renamed Gioacchino Lauro. Her port of registry was Naples. The Italian Official Number 383 was allocated. From 1934, her Code Letters were IBOG. She was assessed as 5,345 GRT, 3,151 NRT. On 10 June 1940, Gioacchino Lauro was in port at Hartlepool, Co Durham when Italy declared war against the United Kingdom. The ship and her cargo were seized as a prize of war, Gioacchino Lauro was passed to the MoWT and renamed Empire Engineer.

Empire Engineer was placed under the management of Weidner, Hopkins & Co Ltd. She regained her previous Official Number. The Code Letters GLYG were allocated. Her port of registry was West Hartlepool, Co Durham. She was assessed at 5,358 GRT, 3,230 NRT.

Little is known of her war service. She was a member of Convoy OA 216, which departed from Methil, Fife on 18 September 1940 and joined Convoy OB 216 at sea on 21 September. Empire Engineer was in ballast and bound for Baltimore, Maryland. Empire Engineer was a member of Convoy SC 20, which departed from Halifax, Nova Scotia, Canada on 22 January 1941 and arrived at Liverpool, Lancashire, United Kingdom on 8 February. She was carrying a cargo of steel ingots bound for Newport, Monmouthshire. Empire Engineer straggled behind the convoy. At 16:44 German time on 4 February, she was hit by a torpedo fired by U-123 and sank within four minutes at 54°21′N 23°15′W. Although some survivors were known to have taken to liferafts, all 39 crew were lost. They are commemorated on the Tower Hill Memorial, London.
