= Reinhard Hardegen =

German U-boat commander (1913–2018)

Korvettenkapitän Reinhard Hardegen
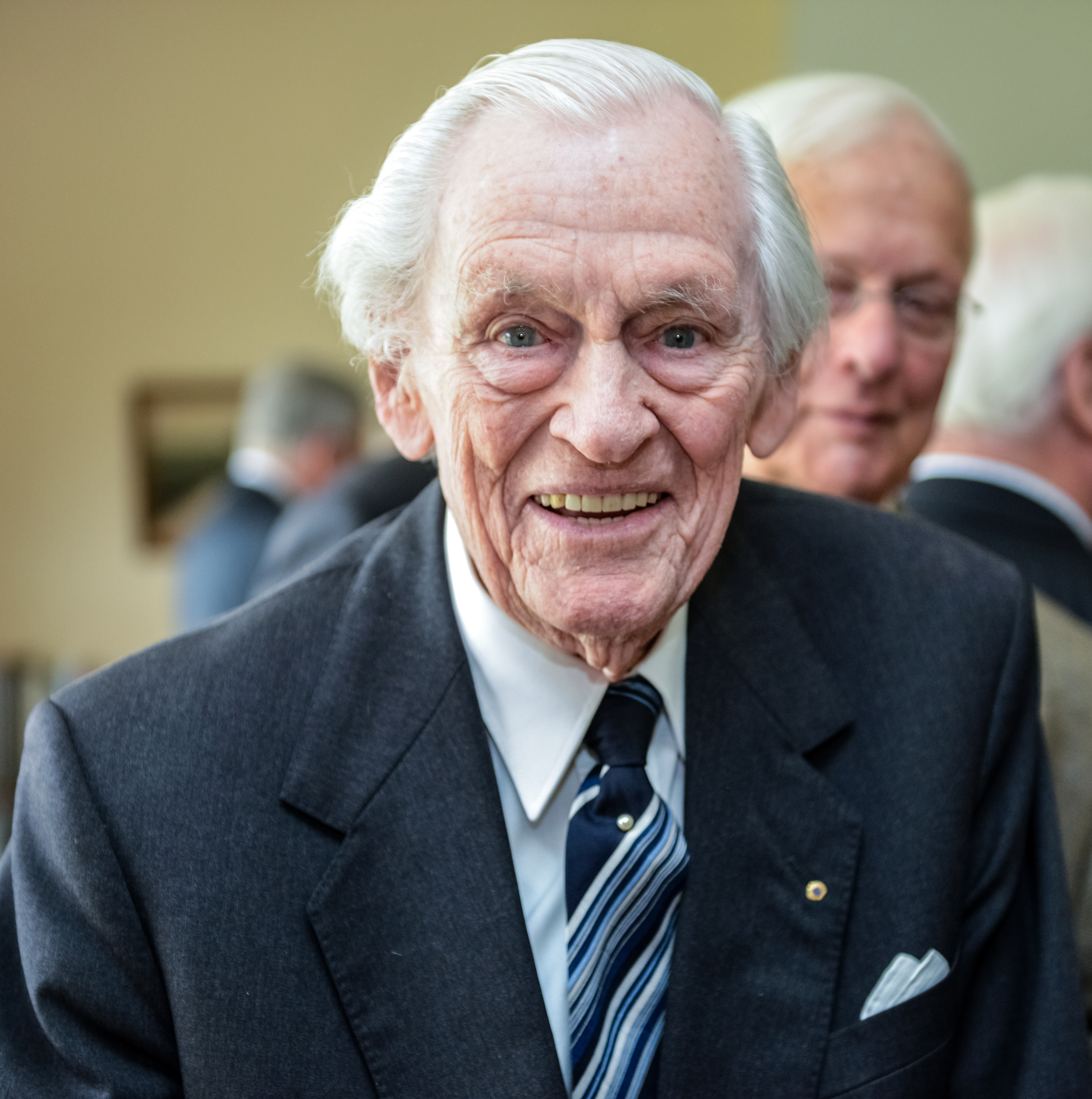
- Hardegen in 2016
- Born: 18 March 1913; Bremen, Germany
- Died: 9 June 2018 (aged 105); Bremen, Germany
- Military career
- Allegiance: Nazi Germany
- Branch: Kriegsmarine
- Service years: 1934–45
- Rank: Korvettenkapitän
- Units: 3rd U-boat Flotilla; 2nd U-boat Flotilla
- Commands: U-147 (11 December 1940–4 April 1941); U-123 (19 May 1941–31 July 1942); Marine-Infanterie-Regiment 6 (February–May 1945)
- Conflicts: World War II: Battle of the Atlantic; Action of 27 March 1942
- Awards: Knight's Cross of the Iron Cross with Oak Leaves
- Other work: Businessman and Politician

Korvettenkapitän Reinhard Hardegen (18 March 1913 – 9 June 2018) was a German U-boat commander during World War II. He was credited with the sinking of 25 ships (two were later refloated), at a total of 136,661 tons. After the war, he spent a year and a half as a British prisoner-of-war before starting a successful oil trading business and serving as a member of Bremen's city council (the Bürgerschaft) for over 32 years. He was the last surviving World War II German U-Boat captain when he died in 2018.

== World War II ==
Hardegen served as 1.WO (First Watch Officer) under Kapitänleutnant Georg-Wilhelm Schulz aboard U-124 and, after two war patrols, was given his own command, the Type IID U-boat U-147, operating out of Kiel, on 11 December 1940. The boat was ready for its first patrol shortly before the new year and, after visiting the U-boat base in Bergen, U-147 was ordered to patrol the convoy routes north of the Hebrides.

On the second day of the patrol, Hardegen fired a torpedo which failed to detonate against a large merchant ship, before being forced to submerge after mistaking a destroyer for a merchant ship. During the dive, the tower hatch was damaged, forcing U-147 to resurface after a short while to make feverish repairs only a few hundred meters from the destroyer. The gathering darkness, however, saved the boat from being detected. The water leaks had damaged the diesel engines aboard the boat, forcing Hardegen to use his electric motors when, later in the night, he saw another merchant passing by. Although slowed, the U-boat had enough speed to close the distance and launch a torpedo which sank the freighter. After interrogating the crew, Hardegen learned it was the Norwegian steamer Augvald 4,811 GRT. A few days later, Hardegen again attacked two freighters, only to find his torpedoes missing or failing to detonate. Shortly thereafter, he was ordered back to Kiel.

After completing the patrol, Hardegen was given command of U-123, a Type IXB U-boat operating out of Lorient. Hardegen's first patrol with U-123 started on 16 June 1941, with a course for West African waters to attack British shipping around Freetown.

On 20 June, Hardegen sank the neutral Portuguese vessel Ganda, mistaking her for a British freighter. Dönitz later ordered all references to this sinking deleted from the journals of U-123 and the matter received little attention. This was one of two known alterations of the Kriegstagebuch ordered by Dönitz, the other being in regard to the sinking of the liner SS Athenia.

His next patrol, in October 1941, took him to the North Atlantic. On 20 October he intercepted a convoy and attacked the British auxiliary cruiser HMS Aurania (13,984 tons). Although badly damaged, the cruiser was towed to harbour for repairs. Some of the crew abandoned the cruiser, however, and Hardegen picked up a survivor who was brought back to France as a prisoner of war. This led Hardegen to claim the sinking.

=== First Drumbeat patrol ===
On 23 December 1941, U-123 left for the first phase of Operation Drumbeat. Five boats, which was all Dönitz could muster, were sent towards the American coast, to take advantage of the confusion in the Eastern Seaboard defense networks shortly after the declaration of war. Hardegen was ordered to penetrate the inshore areas around New York City, however due to the need for strict operational secrecy for this task, no mapping of the area was issued from stores in Lorient, and Hardegen had only large nautical charts as well as a Knaurs pocket atlas (of his own), for navigation.

After sinking the Cyclops and Norness, Hardegen decided to bottom (place the boat on the ocean bottom) the boat and wait for nightfall before proceeding into the harbour itself. During the night of 15 January, Hardegen entered the harbour, nearly beaching the boat when he mistook shorelight for a light ship. The crew of U-123 were elated when they came within the sight of the city itself, all lights burning brightly, (Note: "I cannot describe the feeling with words, but it was unbelievably beautiful and great,” he later wrote of approaching close enough to see Manhattan's glare from his boat, The New York Times reported. “I would have given away a kingdom for this moment if I had one. We were the first to be here, and for the first time in this war a German soldier looked upon the coast of the U.S.A.") but Hardegen did not linger long, due to the lack of merchant traffic. He did sink the British tanker Coimbra (6,768 GRT) on his way out.

Hardegen then proceeded south along the coast, submerging during the day and surfacing at night. Apart from one air attack on 16 January, Hardegen did not experience any resistance from the United States Navy or United States Army Air Forces. During the night of 19 January, Hardegen sank three freighters off Cape Hatteras in shallow waters close to shore. A couple of hours later, he happened upon five more merchants traveling in a group and attacked them with his last two torpedoes and his 105 mm deck gun, sinking a freighter and claiming the tanker Malay (8,207 GRT) as well. Although badly damaged, Malay, traveling empty, had enough buoyancy to stay afloat and managed to make its way to New York under her own power five days later.

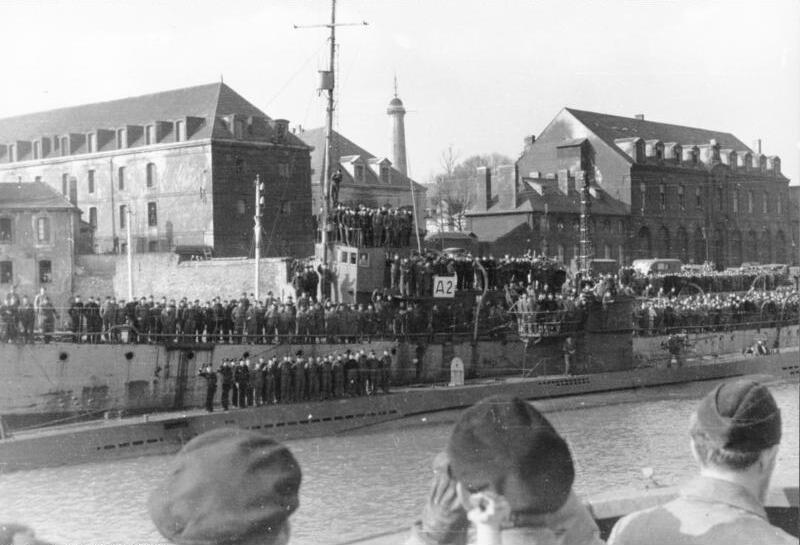
U-123 at Lorient in February 1942.

With all torpedoes expended, and the port diesel engine not functioning optimally, Hardegen decided to set course for home. Just before dawn, the Norwegian whaling factory Kosmos II (16,699 GRT) was spotted only 400 metres (1,300 ft) away. The skipper of Kosmos, Einar Gleditsch, decided to ram U-123, ordering full speed ahead. Hardegen, realizing that the whaler was too close for him to submerge, turned hard to port and ordered full ahead. With its port engine unable to deliver top RPMs, U-123 only just managed to keep ahead of the tanker, and it took over an hour for Hardegen to gain enough of a lead to have room to maneuver.

During the return journey, he spotted and sank the British freighter Culebra (3,400 GRT) on 25 January using the deck gun, but return fire from the freighter damaged the boat. Hardegen approached the lifeboats and gave the survivors food, fresh water and a course to the Bermudas before departing. The following night, the Norwegian tanker Pan Norway (9,231 GRT) was attacked and sunk. After the attack, Hardegen ordered a nearby neutral freighter to pick up the survivors, although he had to repeat his order after the Greek captain decided to steam off without picking up all of the crew. This sinking brought the tally for the first patrol to nine ships sunk for a total of 53,173 GRT over a two-week period, although Hardegen also claimed Malay for a total of 66,135 GRT.

On 23 January, Hardegen received another signal, confirming he had been awarded the Knight's Cross of the Iron Cross for sinking over 100,000 GRT of Allied shipping. He returned home to Lorient on 9 February and received a hero's welcome.

=== Second Drumbeat patrol ===
On 2 March 1942, Hardegen left for his final patrol, his second to American waters. The first successes were achieved when Hardegen sank the American tanker Muskogee (7,034 GRT) on 22 March and the British tanker Empire Steel (8,150 GRT) on 24 March. The latter attack expended four torpedoes, however, as one malfunctioned and one was fired without having been aimed. The tanker, carrying gasoline, burned fiercely for five hours before sinking and no survivors could be spotted. The somber crew of U-123 nicknamed the night the "Tanker Torch night".

On 26 March, Hardegen attacked the American Q-ship USS Atik (3,000 GRT), mistaking it for a merchant freighter. After torpedoing the ship, Hardegen surfaced to sink her with the deck guns, only to find the Atik trying to ram him and opening fire on him with guns that had been concealed behind false bulwarks. Making a getaway on the surface, U-123 received eight hits and one of the crew members was fatally wounded. Approaching the Atik submerged, Hardegen sank her with another torpedo.

Hardegen's second patrol was along the Florida coast. He reached the target area in late March, attacking the American tanker Liebre (7,057 GRT) on 1 April with his deck gun. Although the tanker was badly damaged, an approaching patrol craft forced Hardegen to submerge and leave the area. Liebre was towed to port and was ready to sail again by mid-July. On the night of 8 April, U-123 was positioned off the shore of St. Simons Island, Georgia and torpedoed and sank two tankers: the SS Oklahoma (9,264 GRT) and the Esso Baton Rouge (7,989 GRT). The two tankers were sunk in such shallow water, however, that they were re-floated and put back into service. During the night of 9 April, U-123 sank the cold storage motor ship SS Esparta (3,365 GRT).

On the night of 11 April, U-123 torpedoed and sank the SS Gulfamerica (8,801 GRT) about two miles off the coast of Jacksonville, Florida. The Gulfamerica was on its maiden voyage from Philadelphia to Port Arthur, Texas with 90,000 barrels of fuel oil. After hitting her with a torpedo, Hardegen closed in for the kill with his deck gun. Noting the already large crowds gathering on the beach to watch the spectacle who might be struck by fire in the landward direction, as well as all the beach houses just beyond the Gulfamerica, Hardegen decided to manoeuver around the tanker and attack from the land side. The move was quite hazardous, as the U-boat was clearly illuminated to any onshore weapons, and the shallow waters forced it to take up station only 250 metres (820 ft) from the tanker, which risked return fire from the tanker as well as getting caught in a blaze if the oil spilling out caught fire. The highways leading from Jacksonville were soon thronged with curious people trying to get to the beach to look at the spectacle. After firing for some time with the deck gun, the tanker was ablaze and Hardegen decided to leave. Already planes were overhead trying to locate the submarine with parachute flares, while a destroyer and several smaller patrol boats were closing in.

Forced by an aircraft to crash dive, U-123 found itself on the bottom, only 20 metres (66 ft) under the surface, when the destroyer, USS Dahlgren dropped six depth charges. Taking heavy damage and believing the destroyer would move in for another attack, Hardegen ordered the secret codes and machinery destroyed and the boat abandoned. As the commander, he was to open the tower hatch to allow the crew to escape using the escape gear; however, he was gripped by a paralyzing fear and was unable to proceed with the evacuation. Luckily for him, the Dahlgren, for reasons unknown, failed to drop any more depth charges and, after a short time, moved away, allowing the U-123 to complete emergency repairs and limp towards deeper waters. Hardegen would later tell Michael Gannon, "Only because I was too scared was I not captured."

On the night of 13 April, U-123 attacked the US freighter SS Leslie (2,609 GRT) with its last torpedo and Hardegen's fiftieth torpedo launch. It sank quickly just off Cape Canaveral. About two hours after this attack, Hardegen shelled the Swedish motor ship Korsholm (5,353 GRT) under British charter, and sank her within twenty minutes. He did, however, mistake the freighter for a tanker.

At this point in his second patrol, Hardegen claimed ten ships for a total of 74,815 GRT, whereas in reality he had sunk nine, if counting the two tankers later refloated, for a total of a still respectable 52,336 GRT. To sum up his patrol, Hardegen chose the lyrical approach, sending the following signal to BdU:

Sieben Tankern schlug die letzte Stund,
Die U-Falle sank träger.
Zwei Frachter liegen mit auf Grund,
Versenkt vom Paukenschläger.
(For seven tankers the last hour has passed,
the U-boat trap sank slower.
Two freighters lie on the bottom, too,
sunk by the drum-beater.)

Setting course for home, Hardegen sighted the freighter SS Alcoa Guide (4,834 GRT) on 16 April and sank her with fire from the 105mm deck gun, as well as the 37mm and 20mm flak guns. On 23 April, Hardegen received a signal confirming his award of the Oak Leaves to his Knights Cross. On 2 May, U-123 docked at Lorient, ending Hardegen's career as an active U-boat commander, although he commanded the boat for a final journey, bringing her back to Kiel for some necessary repairs in May 1942.

Throughout his career, Hardegen, as U-boat historian Michael Gannon documents meticulously with accounts from survivors, furnished food and navigational directions to the lifeboats of torpedoed merchantmen when possible and, when he sank the tanker Pan Norway, forcibly halted a neutral ship to have it pick up survivors of a vessel he had sunk nearby. He was also credited with saving Norwegian war sailors and others from death at sea.

=== National Socialism ===
Hardegen said that when he met Adolf Hitler and was awarded the Knight's Cross by him, he thought "then that he was a nice fellow. That was a big mistake". One time, he and fellow Oak Leaves recipient Erich Topp were invited to a dinner with Hitler at the Wolf's Lair. Hardegen claimed to have told Hitler, "...you're always looking to the east, standing with your back to the sea, and this war is a sea war. It will only be decided at sea, won or lost there, and not on land. If you're standing with your back to the sea and you look only landward, then this won't work." Hardegen claimed that the admirals and generals were embarrassed, and that when Hitler left, Hardegen was told by senior officers that he had been quite impertinent to which Hardegen replied, "Why is that? The Führer needs to know the truth. I have to say what I think. He asked me, and I had to tell him." Andrew Williams later wrote Hitler appeared to take some of what Hardegen said to him to heart. A 1994 interview alleges Hardegen expressed some skepticism regarding Nazi atrocities, stating "(Germany stands) accused of some of the most cruel and sadistic crimes against the peoples of Europe. I cannot say I saw any of this, as I was secluded at my training base and was never on the east front fighting. Between you and me, I can say I am a little skeptical about many of the stories being published and I simply do not believe them. They are very farfetched, and told by people who have a political axe to grind it seems. Therefore, while I will say there is much evidence against Hitler, I always keep an open mind". Hardegen told The Atlanta Journal-Constitution in a 1999 interview, "I was not a Nazi...I did my duty for my country, not for Hitler." According to other reports, Hardegen said that by 1942, he and his crew had realized that "Hitler was a madman who was wreaking havoc and driving Germany towards catastrophe".

=== Shore duty ===
On 31 July 1942, Hardegen relinquished command of U-123 and took up duties as an instructor in the 27th U-boat Training Flotilla in Gotenhafen. In March 1943, Kapitänleutnant Hardegen became chief of U-boat training of the torpedo school at Marineschule Mürwik, before taking up a position in the Torpedowaffenamt (torpedo weapon department), where he oversaw testing and development of new acoustic and wired torpedoes. In his last posting, he served as battalion commander in Marine Infanterie Regiment 6 from February 1945 until the end of the war. The unit took part in fierce fighting against the British in the area around Bremen, and most of the officers were killed. Hardegen stated that his survival was due to his being hospitalized with a severe case of diphtheria. For the last few days of the war, Hardegen served on Dönitz's staff in Flensburg, where he was arrested by British troops.

== Later life and death ==
After the war, Hardegen was mistaken for a SS officer with the same last name, and it took him a year and a half to assemble the evidence to convince the Allied interrogators of his real identity. He returned home in November 1946, where he started as a businessman, first on a bike and then in a car. In 1952, he started an oil trading company, which he built up into a great success. Hardegen also served as a member of Parliament (Bürgerschaft of Bremen) for the Christian Democrats in his hometown of Bremen for 32 years. He went into the heating oil business—representing, among others, Texaco, whose ships he had sunk. He visited the United States many times, conversing with survivors and veterans regularly, including men who had tried to kill him during his U-boat service, and made friends with them. In 1989, he appeared in an episode of the American TV show, Unsolved Mysteries, presented originally by Robert Stack, which examined the sinking of the Muskogee. Hardegen returned to Jacksonville in 1990, where he was received as an honoured guest. He would say of the occasion that "The town was very friendly to me." In 2012, he was honoured by the modern military in Germany for his wartime service. He turned 100 in March 2013 in very good health, winning golf trophies and still driving a car. He died on 9 June 2018, aged 105.

== Awards ==
- Wehrmacht Long Service Award 4th Class (1 April 1937)
- Eisernes Kreuz (1939)
  - 2nd Class (18 September 1940)
  - 1st Class (23 August 1941)
- Knight's Cross of the Iron Cross with Oak Leaves
  - Knight's Cross on 23 January 1942 as Kapitänleutnant and commander of U-123
  - 89th Oak Leaves on 23 April 1942 as Kapitänleutnant and commander of U-123
- U-boat War Badge (1939) (18 November 1940)
  - with Diamonds (7 May 1942)
- War Merit Cross 2nd Class (20 April 1944)
