= USS Atik =

United States Navy Q-ship

Coordinates: 35°38′N 70°14′W

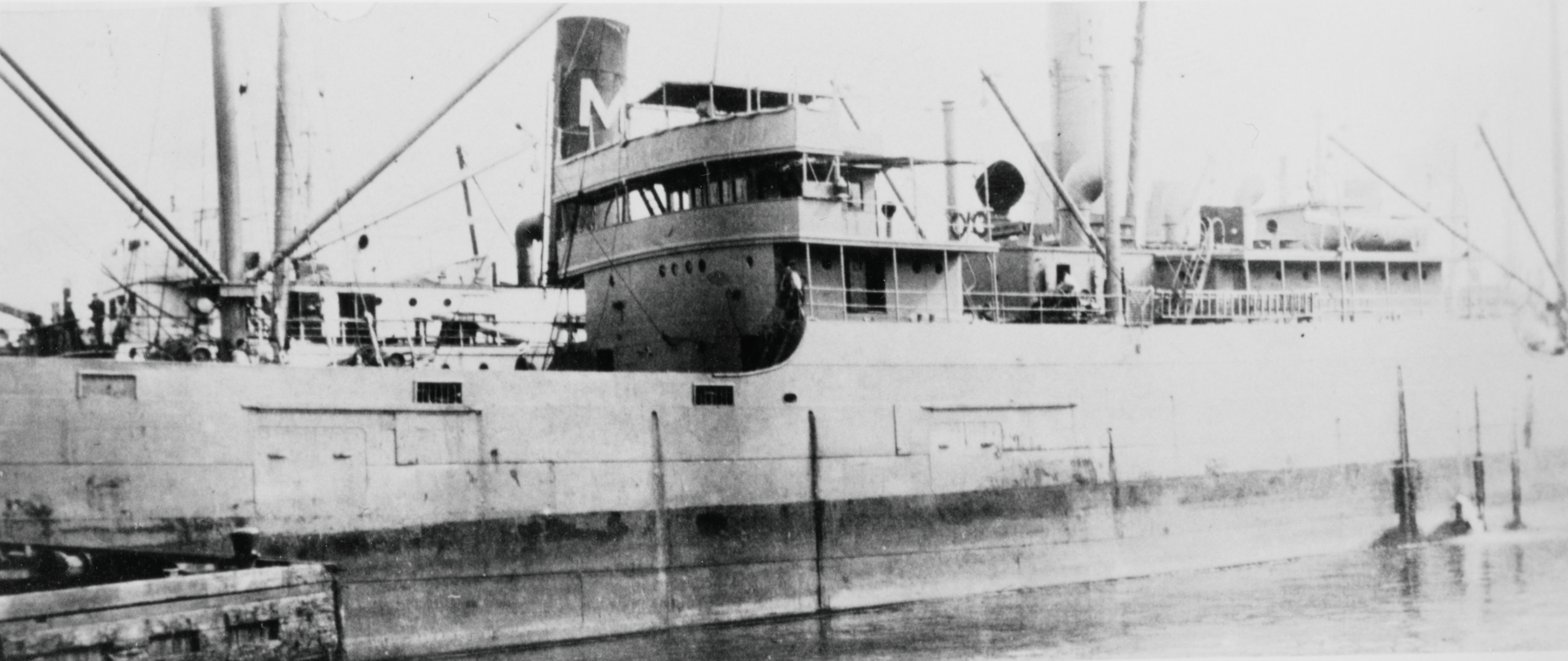
- USS Atik, seen here as the SS Carolyn

History

United States
- Name: Carolyn (1912-1941); Atik (1942)
- Owner: A. H. Bull Steamship Lines
- Builder: Newport News Shipbuilding and Drydock Co., Newport News
- Yard number: 158
- Laid down: 15 March 1912
- Launched: 3 July 1912
- Commissioned: 5 March 1942
- Fate: Sunk 26 March 1942

General characteristics
- Type: Q-ship
- Displacement: 6,610 long tons (6,720 t)
- Length: 382 ft 2 in (116.48 m)
- Beam: 46 ft 1 in (14.05 m)
- Draft: 21 ft 6 in (6.55 m)
- Speed: 9 kn (10 mph; 17 km/h)
- Complement: 141 officers and enlisted
- Armament: 4 × 4 in (100 mm) guns, 4 × .50 in (13 mm) machine guns, 4 × .30 in (7.6 mm) Lewis machine guns, 6 × depth charge projectors

USS Atik (AK-101) was a Q-ship of the United States Navy named for al-Atik, a double star in the constellation Perseus. Her twin sister ship was Asterion.

== History ==
The steel-hulled, single-screw steamer Carolyn was laid down on 15 March 1912 at Newport News, Virginia, by the Newport News Shipbuilding and Dry Dock Company, for the A. H. Bull Steamship Lines; launched on 3 July 1912, sponsored by Ms. Carolyn Bull, a granddaughter of the shipping firm's owner, Archibald Hilton Bull (1847–1920), and delivered on 20 July 1912.

For the next 30 years, Carolyn carried freight and passengers between the West Indies and ports on the eastern seaboard of the U.S. During World War I, she received a main battery of one 3 in (76 mm) and one 5 in (130 mm) gun, and a Navy armed guard detachment served on the ship from 28 June 1917–11 November 1918. During that time, the Navy gave her the identification Id. No. 1608, but did not take her over for naval service.

Carolyn operated under the house flag of the Bull Line during the Japanese attack on Pearl Harbor. A dispatch dated 31 January 1941 expressed the Chief of Naval Operations' desire that Evelyn and Carolyn "be given a preliminary conversion to AK (cargo ship) in the shortest possible time." A letter from the chief of the Bureau of Ships elaborated on the "shortest possible time" when it stated on 12 February that the conversion and outfitting of the vessels was desired "by 1 March 1942." Acquired by the Navy from the Maritime Commission, Carolyn steamed to Portsmouth, New Hampshire, where she was turned over to the Navy under a bareboat charter at 15:30 on 12 February 1942.

Over the next few weeks the two erstwhile "tramps" were given their main and secondary batteries as well as sound gear; nevertheless, they appeared to be mere cargo ships. Carolyn became Atik, and was given a cargo ship hull number, AK-101; Evelyn became Asterion (AK-100). They were to use their old identities when communicating with friendly vessels and stations; if enemy ships should challenge, reply should be made in accordance with International Procedure, using the identification SS Vill Franca, of Portuguese Registry, callsign CSBT.

Atik (AK-101) was commissioned at 16:45 on 5 March 1942, at the Portsmouth Navy Yard.

At the outset, all connected with the program apparently harbored the view that neither ship "was expected to last longer than a month after commencement of [her] assigned duty." Atik's holds were packed with pulpwood, a somewhat mercurial material. If dry, "an explosive condition might well develop," and, if wet, "rot, with resultant fire, might well take place." Despite these disadvantages, pulpwood was selected as the best obtainable material to assure "floatability."

Atik's mission was to lure some unsuspecting U-boat into making a torpedo attack. According to the projected scenario, the submarine, having deemed the tramp unworthy of the expenditure of more torpedoes, would surface to sink the crippled foe with gunfire. The plan presupposed that supporting forces would come to the rescue whenever a Q-ship ran into difficulties. In March 1942, though, there was no such reserve available. The commanding officers of the two ships were told that they could expect little help if they got into trouble. Every available combatant ship and plane was employed in convoy and patrol duties.

Following fitting out and brief sea trials, she and Asterion got underway on 23 March 1942. Soon after leaving port, Atik and Asterion went their separate ways. On the night of 26–27 March, she was cruising about 300 mi (480 km) east of Norfolk, Virginia and Asterion was cruising some 240 mi (390 km) to the south of this area.

=== Action ===
At 19:45 Eastern War Time, UT-4 (note that some accounts use German Winter Time, UT+1), on the night of 26 March, the duty officer in the Joint Operations Control Room, Eastern Sea Frontier (ESF), was informed that an SOS had been picked up from an unidentified ship which had been torpedoed. No further information was available.

Atik had attracted the attention of U-123, on her second war patrol off the eastern seaboard. The U-boat, on the surface, began stalking Atik at 17:00, and at 19:37 fired one torpedo from 700 yd (640 m) away which struck the ship on her port side, under the bridge. Fire broke out immediately, and the ship began to assume a slight list.

At 20:53, radio stations at Manasquan, New Jersey, and at Fire Island, New York, intercepted the distress message:

SSS SOS Lat. 36-00 N, Long. 70-00 W, Carolyn burning forward, not bad.

Two minutes later, a second distress message further amplified:

Torpedo attack, burning forward; require assistance.

As U-123 proceeded around under her victim's stern, her captain, Kapitänleutnant Reinhard Hardegen, noted one boat being lowered on the starboard side and men abandoning ship.

Because such attacks were a regular occurrences at this time, and because all available surface craft were on patrol, the dispatch from Carolyn produced no immediate action. The duty officer in the Control Room had not been informed as to the secret nature of Carolyn, and consequently his only action was to forward the dispatch to Commander-in-Chief, United States Fleet (COMINCH).

After U-123 turned to starboard, Atik gathered steerage way, paralleling her course by turning to starboard as well, and dropped her concealment, commencing fire from her main and secondary batteries. The first shell dropped short of the U-boat, as she made off presenting a small target; the others were off in deflection. She also fired machine guns at U-123, mortally wounding a midshipman standing watch on her bridge. Gradually, the U-boat pulled out of range behind the cover of a smoke screen emitted by her straining diesels, and her captain assessed the damage. As he later recorded, "We had been incredibly lucky."

U-123 submerged and again approached her opponent. At 21:29, the U-boat shot a torpedo into Atik's machinery spaces. Satisfied that this blow would be fatal, U-123 stood off and watched as Atik settled by the bow, her single screw now out of the water.

Once again, Atik's crew could be seen embarking on her boats, as their ship clung stubbornly to the surface. U-123 surfaced at 22:27, confident that Atik was no longer a threat, and continued to watch until 22:50, when an explosion blew her to pieces. Ten minutes later, U-123 buried her only casualty. Atik's entire crew perished, either in the blast or during the severe gale that blew up soon after the ship disintegrated.

Several hours after receiving the report of the SOS, an officer in Cominch Operations room phoned the duty officer and asked if the commander, Eastern Sea Frontier (CESF), or the chief of staff, had been notified. They had not. The duty officer was informed that they should be, immediately. Because CESF and his chief of staff were both in Norfolk on that particular night, the duty officer notified the operations officer at his home.

Early the next morning, a United States Army bomber was sent to search the area from which Carolyn had sent her distress message; the destroyer Noa and the tug Sagamore were sent to assist. The Army bomber returned without having sighted anything. The tug and the destroyer encountered such heavy weather that Sagamore was recalled; Noa searched the area until fuel shortage compelled her to return to New York on 30 March. Other flights were unsuccessful until 30 March, when two Army planes and one flying boat, a PBY-5A Catalina out of Norfolk, reported that they had sighted wreckage roughly ten miles south of the original reported position.

Asterion had intercepted the distress messages from Atik and proceeded directly to the area. Lieutenant Commander Legwen deemed his orders "sufficiently broad to proceed immediately to her assistance. However, Asterion encountered difficulties with her steering gear, and only continued the search for 24 hours before being forced to put into Hampton Roads for repairs.

The Norwegian freighter MS Minerva was sighted in the vicinity, southbound for St. Thomas, Virgin Islands. On her arrival there, she was boarded and interrogation revealed that her crew had sighted no wreckage and had picked up no survivors.

Twelve days later, CESF reported all known details to COMINCH on the "suspected sinking of the SS Carolyn," and concluded: "...it is believed that there is very little chance that any of her officers and crew will be recovered. It is therefore recommended that if no further information is received by 27 April, they be considered lost and that next of kin be notified."

On 9 April, Radio Berlin reported that a U-boat had sunk an adversary. The Associated Press distributed the announcement and it was printed in the New York Times the next day.

The High Command said today that a Q-boat – a heavily armed ship disguised as an unarmed vessel – was among 13 vessels sunk off the American Atlantic coast and that it was sent to the bottom by a submarine only after a "bitter battle." (In the last war, Q-ships accounted for many submarines which slipped up on them thinking they were easy prey. When the submarines came into range, false structures on the Q-boats were collapsed, revealing an array of guns.)

The Q-boat, the communiqué said, was of 3,000 tons and was sunk by a torpedo after a battle "fought partly on the surface with artillery and partly beneath the water with bombs and torpedoes."

As of 2014, no other ships in the United States Navy have been named Atik.

== Bibliography ==
- Beyer, Edward F. & Beyer, Kenneth M. (1991). "U. S. Navy Mystery Ships". Warship International. XXVIII (4). International Naval Research Organization: 322–372. ISSN 0043-0374.
- Q-Ships Versus U-Boats, by Kenneth M. Beyer. U.S. Naval Institute Press, May 1999. Beyer, who served as an officer on Asterion, recounts the story of Astarion and Atik.
