= German submarine U-123 (1940) =

German World War II submarine

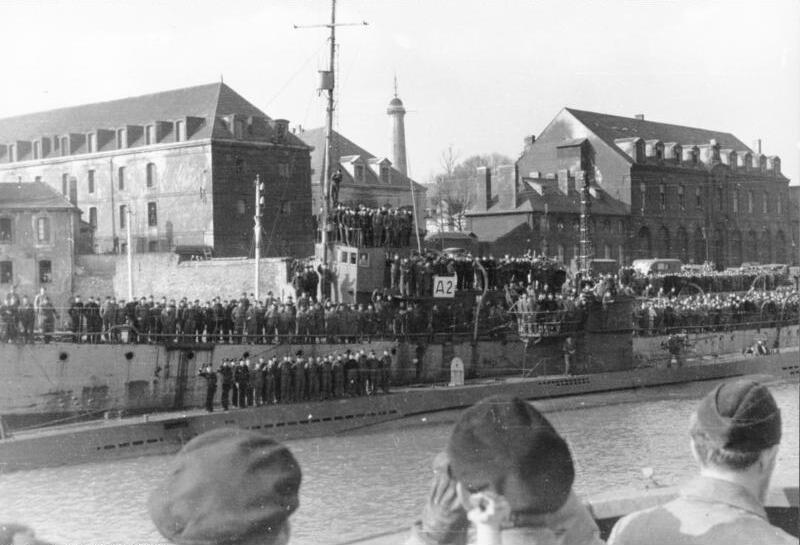
- U-123 at Lorient in February 1942

History

Nazi Germany
- Name: U-123
- Ordered: 15 December 1937
- Builder: DeSchiMAG AG Weser, Bremen
- Yard number: 955
- Laid down: 15 April 1939
- Launched: 2 March 1940
- Commissioned: 30 May 1940
- Decommissioned: 17 June 1944
- Fate: Scuttled at Lorient on 19 August 1944. Raised and later became the French submarine Blaison

France
- Name: Blaison
- Acquired: 1945
- Decommissioned: 18 August 1959

General characteristics
- Class & type: Type IXB submarine
- Displacement: 1,051 tonnes (1,034 long tons) surfaced; 1,178 tonnes (1,159 long tons) submerged
- Length: 76.50 m (251 ft) o/a; 58.75 m (192 ft 9 in) pressure hull
- Beam: 6.76 m (22 ft 2 in) o/a; 4.40 m (14 ft 5 in) pressure hull
- Draught: 4.70 m (15 ft 5 in)
- Installed power: 4,400 PS (3,200 kW; 4,300 bhp) (diesels); 1,000 PS (740 kW; 990 shp) (electric)
- Propulsion: 2 shafts; 2 × diesel engines; 2 × electric motors double-acting electric motors, 1,000 PS (990 shp; 740 kW)
- Speed: 18.2 knots (33.7 km/h; 20.9 mph) surfaced; 7.3 knots (13.5 km/h; 8.4 mph) submerged
- Range: 12,000 nmi (22,000 km; 14,000 mi) at 10 knots (19 km/h; 12 mph) surfaced; 64 nmi (119 km; 74 mi)at 4 knots (7.4 km/h; 4.6 mph) submerged
- Test depth: 230 m (750 ft)
- Complement: 4 officers, 44 enlisted
- Armament: 6 × torpedo tubes (4 bow, 2 stern); 22 × 53.3 cm (21 in) torpedoes; 1 × 10.5 cm (4.1 in) SK C/32 deck gun (180 rounds); 1 × 3.7 cm (1.5 in) SK C/30 AA gun; 1 × 2 cm FlaK 30 AA guns

Service record
- Part of: 2nd U-boat Flotilla; 30 May 1940 – 1 August 1944
- Identification codes: M 08 800
- Commanders: Kptlt. Karl-Heinz Moehle; 30 May 1940 – 19 May 1941; Kptlt. Reinhard Hardegen; 19 May 1941 – 31 July 1942; Oblt.z.S. Horst von Schroeter; 1 August 1942 – 17 June 1944
- Operations: 12 patrols: 1st patrol: 21 September – 23 October 1940; 2nd patrol: 14 – 28 November 1940; 3rd patrol: 14 January – 28 February 1941; 4th patrol: a. 10 April – 11 May 1941; b. 8 – 12 June 1941; 5th patrol: 15 June – 23 August 1941; 6th patrol: 14 October – 22 November 1941; 7th patrol: 23 December 1941 – 9 February 1942; 8th patrol: a. 2 March – 2 May 1942; b. 16 – 24 May 1942; c. 25 – 26 May 1942; d. 26 – 27 May 1942; e. 28 – 29 May 1942; f. 3 – 5 June 1942; 9th patrol: 5 December 1942 – 6 February 1943; 10th patrol: a. 13 March – 8 June 1943; b. 1 – 5 August 1943; 11th patrol: a. 16 August 1943 – 7 November 1943; b. 29 – 30 December 1943; 12th patrol: 9 January – 24 April 1944
- Victories: 43 merchant ships sunk (220,158 GRT); 1 warship sunk (683 tons); 1 auxiliary warship sunk (3,209 GRT); 5 merchant ships damaged (39,584 GRT); 1 auxiliary warship damaged (13,984 GRT)

German submarine U-123 was a Type IXB U-boat of Nazi Germany's Kriegsmarine that operated during World War II. After that conflict, she became the French submarine Blaison (Q165) until she was decommissioned on 18 August 1959.

== Design ==
Type IXB submarines were slightly larger than the original Type IX submarines, later designated IXA. U-123 had a displacement of 1,051 tonnes (1,034 long tons) when at the surface and 1,178 tonnes (1,159 long tons) while submerged. The U-boat had a total length of 76.50 m (251 ft), a pressure hull length of 58.75 m (192 ft 9 in), a beam of 6.76 m (22 ft 2 in), a height of 9.60 m (31 ft 6 in), and a draught of 4.70 m (15 ft 5 in). The submarine was powered by two MAN M 9 V 40/46 supercharged four-stroke, nine-cylinder diesel engines producing a total of 4,400 metric horsepower (3,240 kW; 4,340 shp) for use while surfaced, two Siemens-Schuckert 2 GU 345/34 double-acting electric motors producing a total of 1,000 metric horsepower (740 kW; 990 shp) for use while submerged. She had two shafts and two 1.92 m (6 ft) propellers. The boat was capable of operating at depths of up to 230 metres (750 ft).

The submarine had a maximum surface speed of 18.2 knots (33.7 km/h; 20.9 mph) and a maximum submerged speed of 7.3 knots (13.5 km/h; 8.4 mph). When submerged, the boat could operate for 64 nautical miles (119 km; 74 mi) at 4 knots (7.4 km/h; 4.6 mph); when surfaced, she could travel 12,000 nautical miles (22,000 km; 14,000 mi) at 10 knots (19 km/h; 12 mph). U-123 was fitted with six 53.3 cm (21 in) torpedo tubes (four fitted at the bow and two at the stern), 22 torpedoes, one 10.5 cm (4.13 in) SK C/32 naval gun, 180 rounds, and a 3.7 cm (1.5 in) SK C/30 as well as a 2 cm (0.79 in) C/30 anti-aircraft gun. The boat had a complement of forty-eight.

== Service history ==
U-123 was laid down on 15 April 1939 at the AG Weser yard in Bremen as yard number 955. She was launched on 2 March 1940 and commissioned on 30 May, with Kapitänleutnant Karl-Heinz Moehle (Crew 30) in command. He was relieved on 19 May 1941 by Kptlt. Reinhard Hardegen (Crew 33), who was relieved in turn on 1 August 1942 by his watch officer, Oberleutnant zur See Horst von Schroeter (Crew 37b). He remained in command until the boat was decommissioned on 17 June 1944.

U-123 conducted 12 war patrols, sinking 45 ships, totalling 223,367 gross register tons (GRT) and 683 displacement tons, and damaging six others, totaling 53,568 GRT. Among them were four neutral Swedish merchantmen: SS Anten, MV Korsholm, SS Nanking and MV Venezuela.

=== First patrol ===
U-123's first patrol began with her departure from Kiel on 21 September 1940. Her route took her across the North Sea, through the gap between the Faroe and Shetland Islands and into the Atlantic Ocean west of Ireland. She sank six ships in October, including Shekatika which was hit with no less than five torpedoes before she went to the bottom east southeast of Rockall. Nevertheless, her partial load of pit-props floated free before she went down.

The boat docked at Lorient in occupied France on 23 October.

=== Second patrol ===
U-123 returned to the same general area for her second patrol as for her first. She was also almost as successful, sending another five merchantmen to the bottom. The voyage was marred on 17 November 1940 when Mechanikergefreiter Fritz Pfeifer was lost overboard. After sinking the British convoy straggler, the ore-carrier SS Cree (torpedoed and sunk with the loss of all hands on 21 November) the boat was seriously damaged on 3 November by a collision with an unknown object ("probably a convoy vessel").

She returned to Lorient on 28 November.

=== Third patrol ===
Her score rose steadily, sinking another four ships. One, Grootekerk, was sunk after a nine-hour chase about 330 nmi (610 km; 380 mi) west of Rockall. There were no survivors.

=== Fourth patrol ===
Venturing further west of Ireland on her fourth sortie, the boat sank one ship, Venezuela on 17 April 1941. This was another vessel which required five torpedoes to ensure her destruction. There were also no survivors.

Having set-out from Lorient on 10 April, she returned to the same port on 11 May.

=== Fifth patrol ===
Patrol number five was conducted in the Atlantic, but in the vicinity of the Azores and the Canary Islands. Her first victim this time out was Ganda, a 4,333 GRT neutral registered in Portugal. She went down on 20 June 1941. Following her sinking with torpedoes and gunfire, it was realised what her status was. On her return to Lorient, U-123's war diary (KTB) was altered on the order of U-boat headquarters (BdU).

The U-boat sank four other ships between 27 June and 4 July, but was depth charged for 11 hours on 27 June and only escaped by diving to 199 m (654 ft). She was also unsuccessfully attacked by convoy escorts west of Portugal on 12 August, although she sustained moderate damage.

=== Sixth patrol ===
Despite criss-crossing the Atlantic, U-123 found the pickings rather thin, she did manage to damage the armed merchant cruiser (AMC) HMS Aurania on 21 October 1941 and take one crewman prisoner. The ship had been travelling behind Convoy SL-89 with five other AMCs. The vessel was hit by two torpedoes but empty drums in the holds kept her afloat. A 25 degree list was reduced to 15 degrees; men had abandoned ship prematurely – hence the PoW. The ship continued her voyage, albeit at reduced speed.

=== Seventh patrol ===
U-123 took part in the opening of Unternehmen Paukenschlag ("Operation Drumbeat"), also called the "Second Happy Time" in January 1942. She began by sinking the cargo ship Cyclops about 125 nmi (232 km; 144 mi) southeast of Cape Sable, Nova Scotia on the 12th. Moving down the coast, she sank Norness, Coimbra, Octavian, Norvana, City of Atlanta and the Latvian Ciltvaira. She approached New York's Lower Bay on the evening of 14th Jan and viewed an illuminated New York City. She was also credited with sinking San Jose on 17 January, although this ship was actually lost in a collision. The Malay was only damaged because Hardegen had under-estimated her size and chose to use the deck gun rather than a torpedo. In a reference to American unpreparedness, he commented after sinking Norvana: "These are some pretty buoys we are leaving for the Yankees in the harbor approaches as replacement for the lightships."

U-123 was attacked by an aircraft off New York City, but withdrew without any damage being sustained. She also had a lucky escape on 19 January when Kosmos II (headed by Captain Einar Gleditsch from Sandefjord Norway) tried to ram the boat off Oregon Inlet. At one point the ship was only 75 m (82 yd) away from the German submarine which had an inoperable diesel engine. The U-boat escaped when the recalcitrant power plant was restarted at the last minute and flares were fired at the larger vessel's bridge.

On 19 January 1942, U-123 attacked and sank the American cargo ship SS City of Atlanta. Out of a crew of forty-six, only three survivors were picked up a few hours later by SS Seatrain Texas.

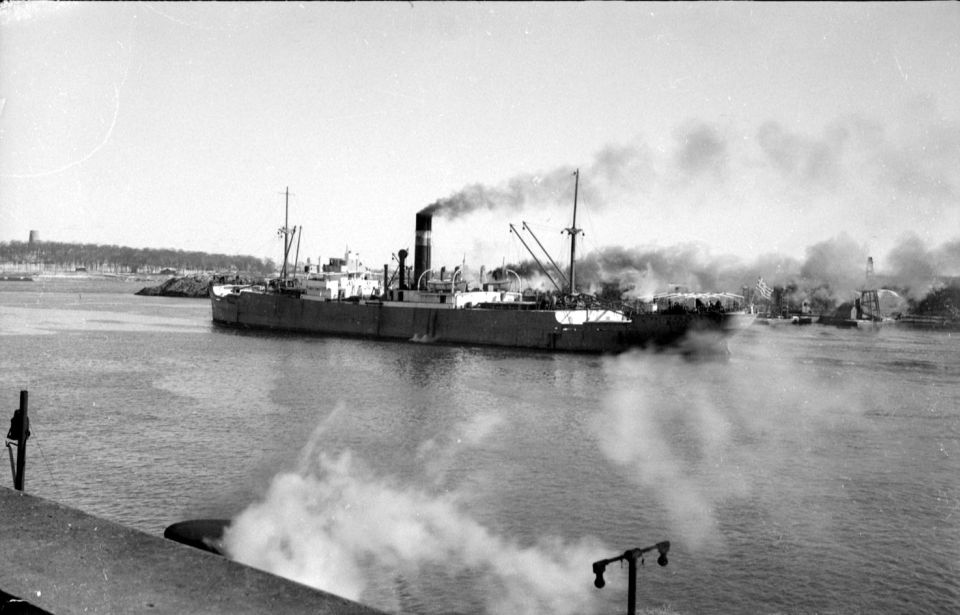
The Mount Aetna which picked up survivors from the Pan Norway

The Culebra and Pan Norway were also sunk off Bermuda. By now out of torpedoes and in the case of Pan Norway, the boat used the last of her deck gun ammunition and 37 mm AA weapon to destroy the Norwegian vessel. The U-boat then encountered a Greek ship, the Mount Aetna, under a Swiss charter, which was directed to the survivors.

=== Eighth patrol ===
The boat's second Paukenschlag mission was also successful – sinking Muskogee and Empire Steel on 22 and 23 March 1942 near Bermuda before moving closer to the US east coast.

She then attacked the USS Atik, a Q ship. This disguised merchantman was hit on the port side, the crew started to abandon ship on the starboard side. The U-boat moved closer, at which point Atik dropped her concealment and opened fire with all weapons. U-123 ran off, (one man died in the action), but she dived, returned and sank the American vessel with a torpedo. There were no survivors.

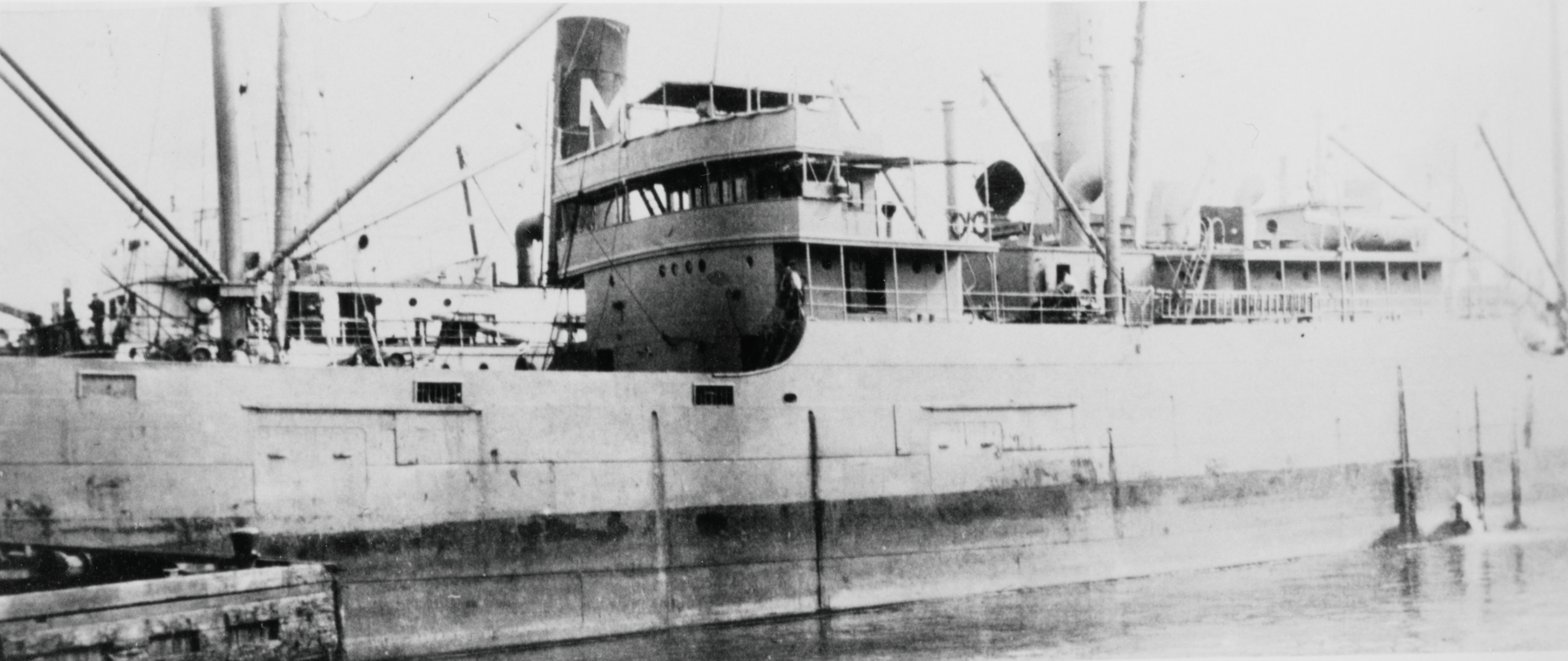
USS Carolyn, aka USS Atik AK-101

This was Captain Reinhard Hardegen's second patrol in charge and quoted from U123 K.T.B war patrol log the following:

Except for Holzer, no one was wounded and a low pressure test showed that the pressure hull was intact. We were incredibly lucky. Eight 20 mm hits were counted on the bridge the next day. After we were out of range I went below deck and saw that the condition of F.z.See Holzer was hopeless. A 20 mm round detonated in his right thigh, ripped open the flesh from the hip joint to the knee and partially removed it. One could not see if the bone had been shattered. The leg was only hanging on small flaps of skin. We bound off the leg. We could only wrap a towel around the big wound because we had not enough dressing material for such injuries. It was immediately clear that such an injury could not be treated even by a doctor under the circumstances aboard a U-boat. We were many days from the next neutral harbor, so I took the decision to make it as easy as possible for him and injected a substantial dose of morphine. Holzer acted bravely in an exemplary manner. For one hour he was conscious, without a single word of complaint.

F.z.See Holzer was buried at sea the following day.

The boat proceeded to sink or damage another eight ships; many of them resting on the sea bed in the shallow water with parts of their hulls above the surface. One such was Oklahoma which, although sent below in 40 ft (12 m) of water on 8 April, was re-floated, repaired and returned to service in December 1942. Another vessel, Gulfamerica was fatally struck about five miles from Jacksonville, Florida on 11 April. The ship had been on her maiden voyage from Port Arthur, Texas to Philadelphia, with 90,000 barrels (14,000 m^{3}) of fuel oil. Nineteen crewmen were killed in the attack. She did not sink until 16 April.

Another victim was Alcoa Guide, engaged at the relatively close range of 400 m (440 yd) by the deck gun, (U-123 had run out of torpedoes), on 17 April.

The boat then returned to Lorient on 2 May and proceeded to steam to Bergen in Norway before carrying out a series of short journeys to Kristiansand, Aarhus, Kiel and Stettin.

=== Ninth patrol ===
For her ninth patrol, U-123 left Kiel on 5 December 1942 and returned to the Atlantic. She sank Baron Cochrane on the 29th after the ship had already been damaged by U-406 and missed by U-591. U-123 also damaged Empire Shackleton, a Catapult Armed Merchantman north of the Azores. (The wreck was sunk by U-435 on the same day).

The boat returned to Lorient on 6 February 1943.

=== Tenth patrol ===
U-123 sailed to the West African coast. She sank the Spanish-registered motor ship Castillo Montealegre on 8 April 1943 west of Conakry, French Guinea. As per maritime rules, the neutral ship had the Spanish flag painted in both sides. Commander Horst von Schroeter ordered the shooting of 3 torpedoes and she sunk in less than a minute. The submarine surfaced, the commander asked from the conning tower "What ship?" to the survivors. Although being confirmed he had just sunk a neutral ship, he left without giving any assistance to the 40 men adrift (five went down with the ship).

A few days later the Hill-class naval trawler HMS Inkpen rescued 29 survivors from a boat. 11 on a separated raft died. The affair was hushed-up by the government of Franco; indeed, the survivors were ordered to shut-up. The career of Commander Horst von Schroeter was unaffected by this affair and after the war he even became a NATO commander.

U-123 was also successful against a British submarine, HMS P-615 100 nmi (190 km; 120 mi) southwest of Freetown in Sierra Leone on 18 April. She sank Empire Bruce on the same day, also southwest of Sierra Leone. She sank three more ships off Monrovia on 29 April, 5 May and 9 May. This included the Holmbury, which was sunk on 5 May by two torpedoes and gunfire. The crew (minus 2 firemen who were killed by the first torpedo) survived, after sailing to the Liberian coast in the one remaining lifeboat. The captain, J B Lawson, was taken aboard U-123, where he was treated impeccably by Von Schroeter. Von Schroeter promised to send relevant photographs to Lawson a year after the war had ended – and did.

=== Eleventh patrol ===
U-123 was depth charged off Cape Finisterre (northwest Spain), by Allied escort vessels on approximately 25 August 1943. She was also attacked by a British De Havilland ('Tse Tse') Mosquito of No. 618 Squadron RAF on 7 November 1943; this aircraft, piloted by Flying Officer A.J.L. Bonnett of the Royal Canadian Air Force, was armed with a 6-pounder (57 mm) Molins gun and this was the first attack on a U-boat with one of these weapons. Bonnett fired eight rounds at U-123 and achieved several hits on the submarine's conning tower and hull. The boat was rendered unable to dive by a 18-by-6.5-centimetre (7.1 by 2.6 in) hole in the pressure hull. One crewman, Bootsmaat Günther Struve was killed and two others wounded.

=== Twelfth patrol ===
U-123's last patrol was her longest – 107 days, but after the incidents of the previous eleven, it was a bit of an anti-climax. She returned to Lorient unable to repeat her success, on 24 April 1944.

== Loss and French service ==
The boat was taken out of service at Lorient on 17 June 1944, she was scuttled there on 19 August. She was raised by the French in 1945 after Germany's surrender, and became the French submarine Blaison (Q165). She was decommissioned on 18 August 1959.

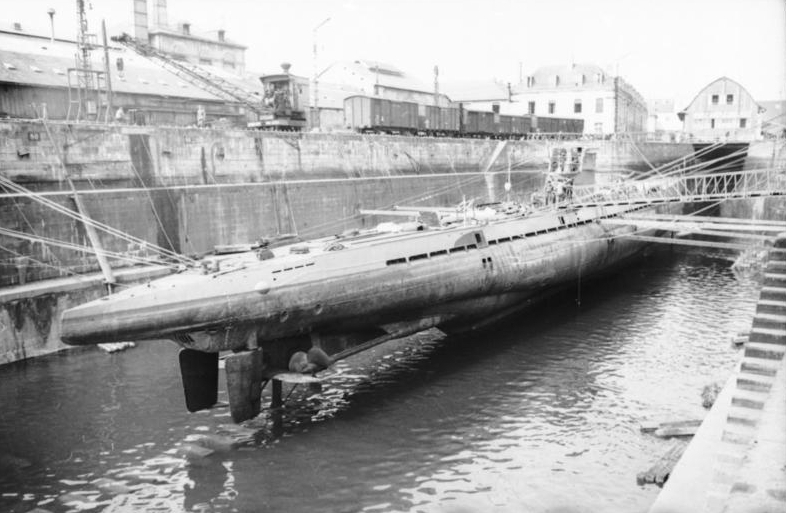
U-37, a U-boat very similar to U-123 at Lorient in 1940. Note the twin rudders

== Summary of raiding history ==
Date	Ship	Nationality	Tonnage (Note: Merchant ship tonnages are in gross register tons. Military vessels are listed by tons displacement.)	Fate
6 October 1940	Benlawers	United Kingdom	5,943	Sunk
10 October 1940	Graigwen	United Kingdom	3,697	Sunk
19 October 1940	Boekelo	Netherlands	2,118	Sunk
19 October 1940	Clintonia	United Kingdom	3,106	Sunk
19 October 1940	Sedgepool	United Kingdom	5,556	Sunk
19 October 1940	Shekatika	United Kingdom	5,458	Sunk
22 November 1940	Cree	United Kingdom	4,791	Sunk
23 November 1940	Anten	Sweden	5,135	Sunk
23 November 1940	King Idwal	United Kingdom	5,115	Sunk
23 November 1940	Oakcrest	United Kingdom	5,407	Sunk
23 November 1940	Tymeric	United Kingdom	5,228	Sunk
24 January 1941	Vespasian	Norway	1,570	Sunk
4 February 1941	Empire Engineer	United Kingdom	5,358	Sunk
15 February 1941	Holystone	United Kingdom	5,462	Sunk
24 February 1941	Grootekerk	Netherlands	8,685	Sunk
17 April 1941	Venezuela	Sweden	6,991	Sunk
20 June 1941	Ganda	Portugal	4,333	Sunk
27 June 1941	Oberon	Netherlands	1,996	Sunk
27 June 1941	P.L.M. 22	United Kingdom	5,646	Sunk
29 June 1941	Rio Azul	United Kingdom	4,088	Sunk
4 July 1941	Auditor	United Kingdom	5,444	Sunk
21 October 1941	HMS Aurania	Royal Navy	13,984	Damaged
12 January 1942	Cyclops	United Kingdom	9,076	Sunk
14 January 1942	Norness	Panama	9,577	Sunk
15 January 1942	Coimbra	United Kingdom	6,768	Sunk
17 January 1942	Octavian	Norway	1,345	Sunk
19 January 1942	Ciltvaira	Latvia	3,779	Sunk
19 January 1942	City of Atlanta	United States	5,269	Sunk
19 January 1942	Malay	United States	8,206	Damaged
19 January 1942	Norvana	United States	2,677	Sunk
25 January 1942	Culebra	United Kingdom	3,044	Sunk
27 January 1942	Pan Norway	Norway	9,231	Sunk
22 March 1942	Muskogee	United States	7,034	Sunk
24 March 1942	Empire Steel	United Kingdom	8,138	Sunk
27 March 1942	USS Atik	United States Navy	3,209	Sunk
2 April 1942	Liebre	United States	7,057	Damaged
8 April 1942	Esso Baton Rouge	United States	7,989	Damaged
8 April 1942	Oklahoma	United States	9,264	Damaged
9 April 1942	Esparta	United States	3,365	Sunk
11 April 1942	Gulfamerica	United States	8,081	Sunk
13 April 1942	Korsholm	Sweden	2,647	Sunk
13 April 1942	Leslie	United States	2,609	Sunk
17 April 1942	Alcoa Guide	United States	4,834	Sunk
29 December 1942	Baron Cochrane	United Kingdom	3,385	Sunk
29 December 1942	Empire Shackleton	United Kingdom	7,068	Damaged
8 April 1943	Castillo Montealegre	Spain	3,972	Sunk
18 April 1943	Empire Bruce	United Kingdom	7,459	Sunk
18 April 1943	HMS P-615	Royal Navy	683	Sunk
29 April 1943	Nanking	Sweden	5,931	Sunk
5 May 1943	Holmbury	United Kingdom	4,566	Sunk
9 May 1943	Kanbe	United Kingdom	6,244	Sunk

== See also ==
- U-Boote westwärts!, Nazi propaganda film in which U-123 was used

== Bibliography ==
- Busch, Rainer; Röll, Hans-Joachim (1999). German U-boat commanders of World War II: a biographical dictionary. Translated by Brooks, Geoffrey. London, Annapolis, Md: Greenhill Books, Naval Institute Press. ISBN 1-55750-186-6.
- Gröner, Erich; Jung, Dieter; Maass, Martin (1991). "U-boats and Mine Warfare Vessels". German Warships 1815–1945. Vol. 2. Translated by Thomas, Keith; Magowan, Rachel. London: Conway Maritime Press. ISBN 0-85177-593-4.
- Sharpe, Peter (1998). U-Boat Fact File. Great Britain: Midland Publishing. ISBN 1-85780-072-9.
- Kemp, Paul (1997). U-Boats Destroyed, German submarine Losses in the World Wars. Arms and Armour. ISBN 1-85409-515-3.
- 70 True Stories of the Second World War. Odhams Press. 1953.
