= List of ship launches in 1943 =

The list of ship launches in 1943 includes a chronological list of some of the ships launched in 1943.

== January ==
Date	Ship	Class	Builder	Location	Country	Notes
2 January	Calvin Coolidge	Liberty ship	New England Shipbuilding Corporation	South Portland, Maine	United States	For War Shipping Administration.
2 January	Edward Preble	Liberty ship	New England Shipbuilding Corporation	South Portland, Maine	United States	For War Shipping Administration.
2 January	Empire Rancher	Severn type collier	J. Harker Ltd.	Knottingley	United Kingdom	For Ministry of War Transport.
2 January	George Rogers Clark	Liberty ship	Permanente Metals Corporation	Richmond, California	United States	For War Shipping Administration.
2 January	John A. Dix	Liberty ship	New England Shipbuilding Corporation	South Portland, Maine	United States	For War Shipping Administration.
2 January	John W. Weeks	Liberty ship	Oregon Shipbuilding Corporation	Portland, Oregon	United States	For War Shipping Administration.
3 January	Francis Preston Blair	Liberty ship	Marinship Corporation	Sausalito, California	United States	For United States Maritime Commission.
3 January	Harrison Gray Otis	Liberty ship	California Shipbuilding Corporation	Los Angeles, California	United States	For War Shipping Administration.
4 January	Benjamin H. Bristow	Liberty ship	Permanente Metals Corporation	Richmond, California	United States	For War Shipping Administration.
4 January	VIC 26	VIC lighter	Richard Dunston Ltd.	Thorne	United Kingdom	For the Admiralty.
5 January	Joseph H. Hollister	Liberty ship	California Shipbuilding Corporation	Los Angeles, California	United States	For War Shipping Administration.
5 January	Stephen B. Elkins	Liberty ship	Oregon Shipbuilding Corporation	Portland, Oregon	United States	For War Shipping Administration.
6 January	Chertsey	Cargo ship	William Pickersgill & Co. Ltd.	Southwick	United Kingdom	For Watts, Watts & Co. Ltd.
6 January	Joseph T. Robinson	Liberty ship	Todd Houston Shipbuilding Corporation	Houston, Texas	United States	For War Shipping Administration.
6 January	Louis Joliet	Liberty ship	Permanente Metals Corporation	Richmond, California	United States	For War Shipping Administration.
6 January	Walter Raleigh	Liberty ship	North Carolina Shipbuilding Company	Wilmington, North Carolina	United States	For War Shipping Administration.
7 January	Daniel S. Lamont	Liberty ship	Oregon Shipbuilding Corporation	Portland, Oregon	United States	For War Shipping Administration.
7 January	Leonidas Polk	Liberty ship	Delta Shipbuilding	New Orleans, Louisiana	United States	For War Shipping Administration.
7 January	Phoebe A. Hearst	Liberty ship	California Shipbuilding Corporation	Los Angeles, California	United States	For War Shipping Administration.
8 January	Empire Darby	Tug	Cochrane & Sons Ltd.	Selby	United Kingdom	For Ministry of War Transport.
8 January	Empire Harmony	Scandinavian type cargo ship	William Gray & Co. Ltd.	West Hartlepool	United Kingdom	For Ministry of War Transport.
8 January	Empire Joan	Tug	Cochrane & Sons Ltd.	Selby	United Kingdom	For Ministry of War Transport.
8 January	William Windom	Liberty ship	Permanente Metals Corporation	Richmond, California	United States	For War Shipping Administration.
9 January	Alexander J. Dallas	Liberty ship	Oregon Shipbuilding Corporation	Portland, Oregon	United States	For War Shipping Administration.
9 January	Empire Coast	Empire Lad-class coastal tanker	Isaac Pimblott & Sons Ltd.	Northwich	United Kingdom	For Ministry of War Transport.
9 January	James Woodrow	Liberty ship	Bethlehem Fairfield Shipyard	Baltimore, Maryland	United States	For War Shipping Administration.
9 January	John Harvey	Liberty ship	North Carolina Shipbuilding Company	Wilmington, North Carolina	United States	For War Shipping Administration.
9 January	LST-465	Landing Ship, Tank	Kaiser Company	Vancouver, Washington	United States	For United States Navy.
9 January	Zane Grey	Liberty ship	California Shipbuilding Corporation	Los Angeles, California	United States	For War Shipping Administration.
10 January	Robert M. La Folette	Liberty ship	Delta Shipbuilding	New Orleans, Louisiana	United States	For War Shipping Administration.
10 January	Samuel de Champlain	Liberty ship	Permanente Metals Corporation	Richmond, California	United States	For War Shipping Administration.
11 January	LST-429	Landing Ship, Tank	Bethlehem Fairfield Shipyard	Baltimore, Maryland	United States	For Royal Navy.
11 January	Pio Pico	Liberty ship	California Shipbuilding Corporation	Los Angeles, California	United States	For War Shipping Administration.
11 January	Ready	Algerine-class minesweeper	Harland & Wolff	Belfast	United Kingdom	For Royal Navy.
11 January	Richard Rush	Liberty ship	Oregon Shipbuilding Corporation	Portland, Oregon	United States	For War Shipping Administration.
12 January	Charles J. Folger	Liberty ship	Permanente Metals Corporation	Richmond, California	United States	For War Shipping Administration.
12 January	John Drake Sloat	Liberty ship	California Shipbuilding Corporation	Los Angeles, California	United States	For War Shipping Administration.
12 January	Stephen C. Foster	Liberty ship	Todd Houston Shipbuilding Corporation	Houston, Texas	United States	For War Shipping Administration.
13 January	Robert Howe	Liberty ship	North Carolina Shipbuilding Company	Wilmington, North Carolina	United States	For War Shipping Administration.
13 January	Samuel D. Ingham	Liberty ship	Oregon Shipbuilding Corporation	Portland, Oregon	United States	For War Shipping Administration.
14 January	John A. Logan	Liberty ship	Permanente Metals Corporation	Richmond, California	United States	For War Shipping Administration.
14 January	LST-423	Landing Ship, Tank	Bethlehem Fairfield Shipyard	Baltimore, Maryland	United States	For Royal Navy.
14 January	Pere Marquette	Liberty ship	Permanente Metals Corporation	Richmond, California	United States	For War Shipping Administration.
15 January	Carlos Carillo	Liberty ship	California Shipbuilding Corporation	Los Angeles, California	United States	For War Shipping Administration.
15 January	George W. Campbell	Liberty ship	Oregon Shipbuilding Corporation	Portland, Oregon	United States	For War Shipping Administration.
15 January	Thomas R. Marshall	Liberty ship	Bethlehem Fairfield Shipyard	Baltimore, Maryland	United States	For War Shipping Administration.
16 January	Walter Q. Gresham	Liberty ship	Delta Shipbuilding	New Orleans, Louisiana	United States	For War Shipping Administration.
17 January	Charles S. Fairchild	Liberty ship	Permanente Metals Corporation	Richmond, California	United States	For War Shipping Administration.
17 January	Cowpens	Independence-class aircraft carrier	New York Shipbuilding Corporation	Camden, NJ	United States	Converted cruiser hull
17 January	Lou Gehrig	Liberty ship	New England Shipbuilding Corporation	South Portland, Maine	United States	For War Shipping Administration.
17 January	Mark Hopkins	Liberty ship	Marinship Corporation	Sausalito, California	United States	For United States Maritime Commission.
17 January	Nathaniel Macon	Liberty ship	North Carolina Shipbuilding Company	Wilmington, North Carolina	United States	For War Shipping Administration.
17 January	William J. Duane	Liberty ship	Oregon Shipbuilding Corporation	Portland, Oregon	United States	For War Shipping Administration.
18 January	Andrew G. Curbin	Liberty ship	Bethlehem Fairfield Shipyard	Baltimore, Maryland	United States	For War Shipping Administration.
18 January	Black Hawk	Liberty ship	Delta Shipbuilding	New Orleans, Louisiana	United States	For War Shipping Administration.
18 January	William S. Young	Liberty ship	California Shipbuilding Corporation	Los Angeles, California	United States	For War Shipping Administration.
19 January	George E. Hale	Liberty ship	California Shipbuilding Corporation	Los Angeles, California	United States	For War Shipping Administration.
19 January	John M. Palmer	Liberty ship	Permanente Metals Corporation	Richmond, California	United States	For War Shipping Administration.
19 January	John Wright Stanly	Liberty ship	North Carolina Shipbuilding Company	Wilmington, North Carolina	United States	For War Shipping Administration.
19 January	Thomas Ewing	Liberty ship	Oregon Shipbuilding Corporation	Portland, Oregon	United States	For War Shipping Administration.
20 January	Empire Capulet	Cargo ship	John Readhead & Sons Ltd.	South Shields	United Kingdom	For Ministry of War Transport
20 January	Firelight	Collier	Burntisland Shipbuilding Company	Burntisland	United Kingdom	For Gas, Light & Coke Co. Ltd.
21 January	Francis Nash	Liberty ship	North Carolina Shipbuilding Company	Wilmington, North Carolina	United States	For War Shipping Administration.
21 January	George Walton	Liberty ship	Southeastern Shipbuilding Corporation	Savannah, Georgia	United States	For War Shipping Administration.
21 January	Thomas Nast	Liberty ship	California Shipbuilding Corporation	Los Angeles, California	United States	For War Shipping Administration.
21 January	William Eustis	Liberty ship	Todd Houston Shipbuilding Corporation	Houston, Texas	United States	For War Shipping Administration.
21 January	William McKinley	Liberty ship	Bethlehem Fairfield Shipyard	Baltimore, Maryland	United States	For War Shipping Administration.
21 January	Yorktown	Essex-class aircraft carrier	Newport News Shipbuilding	Newport News, Virginia	United States	
22 January	Kumasian	Cargo ship	Furness Shipbuilding Co Ltd	Haverton Hill-on-Tees	United Kingdom	For United Africa Co. Ltd.
22 January	Richard Olney	Liberty ship	Delta Shipbuilding	New Orleans, Louisiana	United States	For War Shipping Administration.
22 January	Richard Yates	Liberty ship	Permanente Metals Corporation	Richmond, California	United States	For War Shipping Administration.
22 January	Walter Forward	Liberty ship	Oregon Shipbuilding Corporation	Portland, Oregon	United States	For War Shipping Administration.
23 January	Empire Spitfire	Near-Warrior type tug	A. Hall & Co. Ltd.	Aberdeen	United Kingdom	For Ministry of War Transport.
23 January	John G. Carlisle	Liberty ship	Permanente Metals Corporation	Richmond, California	United States	For War Shipping Administration.
23 January	TRV 3	Torpedo recovery vessel	Richards Ironworks Ltd.	Lowestoft	United Kingdom	For the Admiralty.
24 January	Ephraim Brevard	Liberty ship	North Carolina Shipbuilding Company	Wilmington, North Carolina	United States	For War Shipping Administration.
24 January	Nancy Hanks	Liberty ship	Permanente Metals Corporation	Richmond, California	United States	For War Shipping Administration.
24 January	Samuel P. Langley	Liberty ship	California Shipbuilding Corporation	Los Angeles, California	United States	For War Shipping Administration.
25 January	Horace Gray	Liberty ship	Bethlehem Fairfield Shipyard	Baltimore, Maryland	United States	For War Shipping Administration.
25 January	Southern Coast	Coaster	Ardrossan Dockyard Ltd.	Ardrossan	United Kingdom	For Coast Lines Ltd.
26 January	George E. Badger	Liberty ship	North Carolina Shipbuilding Company	Wilmington, North Carolina	United States	For War Shipping Administration.
26 January	James Robertson	Liberty ship	California Shipbuilding Corporation	Los Angeles, California	United States	For War Shipping Administration.
26 January	Oxna	Isles-class trawler	Harland & Wolff	Govan	United Kingdom	For Royal Navy.
27 January	William C. Gorgas	Liberty ship	Alabama Drydock and Shipbuilding Company	Mobile, Alabama	United States	For War Shipping Administration.
28 January	Andrew D. White	Liberty ship	Marinship Corporation	Sausalito, California	United States	For United States Maritime Commission.
28 January	Daniel Webster	Liberty ship	New England Shipbuilding Corporation	South Portland, Maine	United States	For War Shipping Administration.
28 January	Edward P. Costigan	Liberty ship	Permanente Metals Corporation	Richmond, California	United States	For War Shipping Administration.
28 January	Henry B. Brown	Liberty ship	Bethlehem Fairfield Shipyard	Baltimore, Maryland	United States	For War Shipping Administration.
28 January	John Armstrong	Liberty ship	Todd Houston Shipbuilding Corporation	Houston, Texas	United States	For War Shipping Administration.
28 January	William J. Worth	Liberty ship	California Shipbuilding Corporation	Los Angeles, California	United States	For War Shipping Administration.
29 January	Frankli MacVeagh	Liberty ship	Oregon Shipbuilding Corporation	Portland, Oregon	United States	For War Shipping Administration.
29 January	Lyman J. Gage	Liberty ship	Permanente Metals Corporation	Richmond, California	United States	For War Shipping Administration.
30 January	Benjamin Bonneville	Liberty ship	Permanente Metals Corporation	Richmond, California	United States	For War Shipping Administration.
30 January	Cordova	Bogue-class escort carrier	Seattle-Tacoma Shipyard	Tacoma, WA	United States	Converted C3 merchant freighter for Lend-Lease as HMS Khedive
30 January	Flora MacDonald	Liberty ship	North Carolina Shipbuilding Company	Wilmington, North Carolina	United States	For War Shipping Administration.
30 January	Howard Stansbury	Liberty ship	California Shipbuilding Corporation	Los Angeles, California	United States	For War Shipping Administration.
30 January	Molly Pitcher	Liberty ship	Bethlehem Fairfield Shipyard	Baltimore, Maryland	United States	For War Shipping Administration.
30 January	Pierre Soule	Liberty ship	Delta Shipbuilding	New Orleans, Louisiana	United States	For War Shipping Administration.
31 January	George M. Bibb	Liberty ship	Oregon Shipbuilding Corporation	Portland, Oregon	United States	For War Shipping Administration.
31 January	Lawton B. Evans	Liberty ship	Alabama Drydock and Shipbuilding Company	Mobile, Alabama	United States	For War Shipping Administration.
31 January	Noah Webster	Liberty ship	New England Shipbuilding Corporation	South Portland, Maine	United States	For War Shipping Administration.
31 January	Richard Henderson	Liberty ship	Permanente Metals Corporation	Richmond, California	United States	For War Shipping Administration.
31 January	Robert Stuart	Liberty ship	California Shipbuilding Corporation	Los Angeles, California	United States	For War Shipping Administration.
31 January	Walter E. Ranger	Liberty ship	New England Shipbuilding Corporation	South Portland, Maine	United States	For War Shipping Administration.
January	MFV-22	Naval Motor Fishing Vessel	Anderson, Rigden & Perkins Ltd.	Whitstable	United Kingdom	For Royal Navy.
January	VIC 16	VIC lighter	Isaac Pimblott & Sons Ltd.	Northwich	United Kingdom	For the Admiralty.

== February ==
Date	Ship	Class	Builder	Location	Country	Notes
2 February	Robert J. Walker	Liberty ship	Oregon Shipbuilding Corporation	Portland, Oregon	United States	For War Shipping Administration.
2 February	William Dunbar	Liberty ship	California Shipbuilding Corporation	Los Angeles, California	United States	For War Shipping Administration.
3 February	James Sprunt	Liberty ship	North Carolina Shipbuilding Company	Wilmington, North Carolina	United States	For War Shipping Administration.
3 February	Talybont	Hunt-class destroyer	J. Samuel White	East Cowes	United Kingdom	For Royal Navy
4 February	British Respect	Tanker	Swan, Hunter & Wigham Richardson Ltd.	Newcastle upon Tyne	United Kingdom	For British Tanker Co. Ltd.
4 February	George C. Yount	Liberty ship	California Shipbuilding Corporation	Los Angeles, California	United States	For War Shipping Administration.
4 February	Sieur Duluth	Liberty ship	Permanente Metals Corporation	Richmond, California	United States	For War Shipping Administration.
4 February	William H. Aspinwall	Liberty ship	Permanente Metals Corporation	Richmond, California	United States	For War Shipping Administration.
5 February	George Shiras	Liberty ship	Bethlehem Fairfield Shipyard	Baltimore, Maryland	United States	For War Shipping Administration.
5 February	William H. Crawford	Liberty ship	Todd Houston Shipbuilding Corporation	Houston, Texas	United States	For War Shipping Administration.
5 February	William M. Meredith	Liberty ship	Oregon Shipbuilding Corporation	Portland, Oregon	United States	For War Shipping Administration.
6 February	Eastwind	Wind-class icebreaker	Western Pipe and Steel Company	San Francisco, California	United States	For United States Navy
6 February	Empire Deed	Cargo ship	Bartram & Sons	Sunderland, County Durham	United Kingdom	For Ministry of War Transport
6 February	Empire Harbour	Coastal tanker	Grangemouth Dockyard	Grangemouth	United Kingdom	For Ministry of War Transport
6 February	Empire Prowess	Cargo ship	William Gray & Co. Ltd.	West Hartlepool	United Kingdom	For Ministry of War Transport.
6 February	Lyman Hall	Liberty ship	Southeastern Shipbuilding Corporation	Savannah, Georgia	United States	For War Shipping Administration.
6 February	Matt W. Ransom	Liberty ship	North Carolina Shipbuilding Company	Wilmington, North Carolina	United States	For War Shipping Administration.
6 February	Samuel Blatchford	Liberty ship	Bethlehem Fairfield Shipyard	Baltimore, Maryland	United States	For War Shipping Administration.
6 February	Sebastian Cermeno	Liberty ship	Marinship Corporation	Sausalito, California	United States	For United States Maritime Commission.
6 February	Solomon Juneau	Liberty ship	California Shipbuilding Corporation	Los Angeles, California	United States	For War Shipping Administration.
7 February	Charles Wilkes	Liberty ship	Permanente Metals Corporation	Richmond, California	United States	For War Shipping Administration.
7 February	Empire Celia	Cargo ship	Charles Connell & Co Ltd	Glasgow	United Kingdom	For Ministry of War Transport.
7 February	John Whiteaker	Liberty ship	Oregon Shipbuilding Corporation	Portland, Oregon	United States	For War Shipping Administration.
7 February	Narica	Tanker	Harland & Wolff Ltd.	Belfast	United Kingdom	For Anglo-Saxon Petroleum Co. Ltd.
8 February	Edward Fanning	Liberty ship	California Shipbuilding Corporation	Los Angeles, California	United States	For War Shipping Administration.
9 February	Grenville M. Dodge	Liberty ship	Permanente Metals Corporation	Richmond, California	United States	For War Shipping Administration.
9 February	Phineas Banning	Liberty ship	California Shipbuilding Corporation	Los Angeles, California	United States	For War Shipping Administration.
9 February	Sam Jackson	Liberty ship	Oregon Shipbuilding Corporation	Portland, Oregon	United States	For War Shipping Administration.
10 February	Furnifiel M. Simmons	Liberty ship	North Carolina Shipbuilding Company	Wilmington, North Carolina	United States	For War Shipping Administration.
10 February	James Barbour	Liberty ship	Todd Houston Shipbuilding Corporation	Houston, Texas	United States	For War Shipping Administration.
11 February	Mahlon Pitney	Liberty ship	Bethlehem Fairfield Shipyard	Baltimore, Maryland	United States	For War Shipping Administration.
11 February	Owen Summers	Liberty ship	Oregon Shipbuilding Corporation	Portland, Oregon	United States	For War Shipping Administration.
11 February	William Pierce Frye	Liberty ship	New England Shipbuilding Corporation	South Portland, Maine	United States	For War Shipping Administration.
12 February	Edmund Randolph	Liberty ship	California Shipbuilding Corporation	Los Angeles, California	United States	For War Shipping Administration.
12 February	Peter Donahue	Liberty ship	Marinship Corporation	Sausalito, California	United States	For United States Maritime Commission.
12 February	Robert Bacon	Liberty ship	Delta Shipbuilding	New Orleans, Louisiana	United States	For War Shipping Administration.
12 February	Thomas Kearns	Liberty ship	Permanente Metals Corporation	Richmond, California	United States	For War Shipping Administration.
12 February	William R. Day	Liberty ship	Bethlehem Fairfield Shipyard	Baltimore, Maryland	United States	For War Shipping Administration.
13 February	Arthur Riggs	Liberty ship	Oregon Shipbuilding Corporation	Portland, Oregon	United States	For War Shipping Administration.
13 February	Edward B. Dudley	Liberty ship	North Carolina Shipbuilding Company	Wilmington, North Carolina	United States	For War Shipping Administration.
13 February	Edward Livingston	Liberty ship	California Shipbuilding Corporation	Los Angeles, California	United States	For War Shipping Administration.
13 February	Justin S. Morrill	Liberty ship	Permanente Metals Corporation	Richmond, California	United States	For War Shipping Administration.
13 February	Rufus W. Peckham	Liberty ship	Bethlehem Fairfield Shipyard	Baltimore, Maryland	United States	For War Shipping Administration.
14 February	Eliphalet Nott	Liberty ship	New England Shipbuilding Corporation	South Portland, Maine	United States	For War Shipping Administration.
14 February	Isaac Sharpless	Liberty ship	New England Shipbuilding Corporation	South Portland, Maine	United States	For War Shipping Administration.
15 February	John H. Eatoon	Liberty ship	Todd Houston Shipbuilding Corporation	Houston, Texas	United States	For War Shipping Administration.
16 February	Josiah Royce	Liberty ship	California Shipbuilding Corporation	Los Angeles, California	United States	For War Shipping Administration.
16 February	Julien Dubuque	Liberty ship	Permanente Metals Corporation	Richmond, California	United States	For War Shipping Administration.
16 February	Lot Whitcomb	Liberty ship	Oregon Shipbuilding Corporation	Portland, Oregon	United States	For War Shipping Administration.
16 February	Willie Jones	Liberty ship	North Carolina Shipbuilding Company	Wilmington, North Carolina	United States	For War Shipping Administration.
17 February	Abbot	Fletcher-class destroyer	Bath Iron Works	Bath, Maine	United States	For United States Navy
17 February	Vitus Bering	Liberty ship	Permanente Metals Corporation	Richmond, California	United States	For War Shipping Administration.
18 February	Daniel Drake	Liberty ship	California Shipbuilding Corporation	Los Angeles, California	United States	For War Shipping Administration.
18 February	Moreton M. McCarver	Liberty ship	Oregon Shipbuilding Corporation	Portland, Oregon	United States	For War Shipping Administration.
18 February	Nathan Clifford	Liberty ship	Bethlehem Fairfield Shipyard	Baltimore, Maryland	United States	For War Shipping Administration.
19 February	Adoniram Judson	Liberty ship	Permanente Metals Corporation	Richmond, California	United States	For War Shipping Administration.
19 February	Empire Friendship	Cargo ship	Short Brothers Ltd.	Sunderland	United Kingdom	For Ministry of War Transport
19 February	George Sharswood	Liberty ship	Bethlehem Fairfield Shipyard	Baltimore, Maryland	United States	For War Shipping Administration.
19 February	James Moore	Liberty ship	North Carolina Shipbuilding Company	Wilmington, North Carolina	United States	For War Shipping Administration.
19 February	Joel R. Poinsett	Liberty ship	Todd Houston Shipbuilding Corporation	Houston, Texas	United States	For War Shipping Administration.
20 February	Ararat	Bathurst-class corvette	Evans Deakin and Company	Brisbane	Australia	For Royal Australian Navy
20 February	Benjamin Lundy	Liberty ship	California Shipbuilding Corporation	Los Angeles, California	United States	For War Shipping Administration.
20 February	Bowcombe	C-type coaster	S. P. Austin & Sons Ltd.	Sunderland	United Kingdom	For .Stephenson, Clarke Ltd.
20 February	Delgada	Bogue-class escort carrier	Seattle-Tacoma Shipbuilding Corporation	Tacoma, Washington	United States	For United States Navy
20 February	Estero	Bogue-class escort carrier	Seattle-Tacoma Shipbuilding Corporation	Tacoma, Washington	United States	For United States Navy
20 February	Hall J. Kelley	Liberty ship	Oregon Shipbuilding Corporation	Portland, Oregon	United States	For War Shipping Administration.
20 February	John R. Park	Liberty ship	Permanente Metals Corporation	Richmond, California	United States	For War Shipping Administration.
20 February	Louis D. Branders	Liberty ship	Bethlehem Fairfield Shipyard	Baltimore, Maryland	United States	For War Shipping Administration.
21 February	John Milledge	Liberty ship	Southeastern Shipbuilding Corporation	Savannah, Georgia	United States	For War Shipping Administration.
22 February	Alfred Moore	Liberty ship	North Carolina Shipbuilding Company	Wilmington, North Carolina	United States	For War Shipping Administration.
22 February	Empire Valour	Scandinavian type cargo ship	William Gray & Co. Ltd.	West Hartlepool	United Kingdom	For Ministry of War Transport.
22 February	Henry L. Benning	Liberty ship	Bethlehem Fairfield Shipyard	Baltimore, Maryland	United States	For War Shipping Administration.
23 February	Biloxi	Cleveland-class cruiser	Newport News Shipbuilding	Newport News, Virginia	United States	For United States Navy
22 February	John W. Cullen	Liberty ship	Oregon Shipbuilding Corporation	Portland, Oregon	United States	For War Shipping Administration.
23 February	British Purpose	Tanker	Furness Shipbuilding Co. Ltd.	Haverton Hill-on-Tees	United Kingdom	For British Tanker Co. Ltd.
23 February	Clan Campbell	Cargo ship	Greenock Dockyard Co. Ltd.	Greenock	United Kingdom	For the Clan Line Steamers Ltd.
23 February	Empire Audrey	Coastal tanker	G. Brown & Co. (Marine) Ltd.	Greenock	United Kingdom	For Ministry of War Transport.
23 February	Empire Beatrice	Cargo ship	Lithgows Ltd.	Port Glasgow	United Kingdom	For Ministry of War Transport.
23 February	Theodore Dwight Weld	Liberty ship	California Shipbuilding Corporation	Los Angeles, California	United States	For War Shipping Administration.
24 February	Hiram S. Maxim	Liberty ship	Permanente Metals Corporation	Richmond, California	United States	For War Shipping Administration.
24 February	John Bell	Liberty ship	Todd Houston Shipbuilding Corporation	Houston, Texas	United States	For War Shipping Administration.
24 February	Nathaniel J. Wyeth	Liberty ship	Oregon Shipbuilding Corporation	Portland, Oregon	United States	For War Shipping Administration.
24 February	Philander C. Knox	Liberty ship	Delta Shipbuilding	New Orleans, Louisiana	United States	For War Shipping Administration.
24 February	Theodore Parker	Liberty ship	California Shipbuilding Corporation	Los Angeles, California	United States	For War Shipping Administration.
25 February	Daniel T. Griffin	Buckley-class destroyer escort	Bethlehem Hingham Shipyard	Hingham, Massachusetts	United States	For United States Navy
25 February	Henderson Luelling	Liberty ship	Oregon Shipbuilding Corporation	Portland, Oregon	United States	For War Shipping Administration.
25 February	John Clarke	Liberty ship	Walsh-Kaiser Company	Providence, Rhode Island	United States	For War Shipping Administration.
25 February	John G. Nicolay	Liberty ship	Permanente Metals Corporation	Richmond, California	United States	For War Shipping Administration.
25 February	John Trumbull	Liberty ship	New England Shipbuilding Corporation	South Portland, Maine	United States	For War Shipping Administration.
25 February	Newton D. Baker	Liberty ship	J. A. Jones Construction Company	Panama City, Florida	United States	For War Shipping Administration.
25 February	Redpole	Modified Black Swan-class sloop	Harrow's	Scotstoun	United Kingdom	For Royal Navy.
25 February	Woodrow Wilson	Liberty ship	North Carolina Shipbuilding Company	Wilmington, North Carolina	United States	For War Shipping Administration.
27 February	E. J. Harriman	Liberty ship	Oregon Shipbuilding Corporation	Portland, Oregon	United States	For War Shipping Administration.
27 February	James G. Birney	Liberty ship	California Shipbuilding Corporation	Los Angeles, California	United States	For War Shipping Administration.
27 February	James W. Denver	Liberty ship	Bethlehem Fairfield Shipyard	Baltimore, Maryland	United States	For War Shipping Administration.
26 February	James B. Hickock	Liberty ship	Permanente Metals Corporation	Richmond, California	United States	For War Shipping Administration.
28 February	Edward Bates	Liberty ship	Permanente Metals Corporation	Richmond, California	United States	For War Shipping Administration.
28 February	Lydia M. Child	Liberty ship	California Shipbuilding Corporation	Los Angeles, California	United States	For War Shipping Administration.
28 February	Monterey	Independence-class aircraft carrier	New York Shipbuilding Corporation	Camden, New Jersey	United States	For United States Navy
28 February	TID 1	TID-class tug	Richard Dunston Ltd.	Thorne	United Kingdom	For the Admiralty.
28 February	William D. Pender	Liberty ship	North Carolina Shipbuilding Company	Wilmington, North Carolina	United States	For War Shipping Administration.
Unknown date	Powerful	Majestic-class aircraft carrier	Harland and Wolff	Govan, Renfrewshire	United Kingdom	For Royal Navy

== March ==
Date	Ship	Class	Builder	Location	Country	Notes
1 March	Cushing Bells	Liberty ship	Oregon Shipbuilding Corporation	Portland, Oregon	United States	For War Shipping Administration.
1 March	Roger Griswold	Liberty ship	Delta Shipbuilding	New Orleans, Louisiana	United States	For War Shipping Administration.
1 March	Thomas Cresap	Liberty ship	Bethlehem Fairfield Shipyard	Baltimore, Maryland	United States	For War Shipping Administration.
2 March	Rachel Jackson	Liberty ship	California Shipbuilding Corporation	Los Angeles, California	United States	For War Shipping Administration.
2 March	William B. Ogden	Liberty ship	Permanente Metals Corporation	Richmond, California	United States	For War Shipping Administration.
3 March	James Harrod	Liberty ship	Oregon Shipbuilding Corporation	Portland, Oregon	United States	For War Shipping Administration.
3 March	John Gallup	Liberty ship	Bethlehem Fairfield Shipyard	Baltimore, Maryland	United States	For War Shipping Administration.
4 March	Charles P. Steinmetz	Liberty ship	Permanente Metals Corporation	Richmond, California	United States	For War Shipping Administration.
4 March	James McHenry	Liberty ship	Delta Shipbuilding	New Orleans, Louisiana	United States	For War Shipping Administration.
4 March	Josiah B. Grinnell	Liberty ship	Permanente Metals Corporation	Richmond, California	United States	For War Shipping Administration.
4 March	Maria Mitchell	Liberty ship	California Shipbuilding Corporation	Los Angeles, California	United States	For War Shipping Administration.
5 March	Christopher Greenup	Liberty ship	Oregon Shipbuilding Corporation	Portland, Oregon	United States	For War Shipping Administration.
5 March	Hannibal Hamlin	Liberty ship	New England Shipbuilding Corporation	South Portland, Maine	United States	For War Shipping Administration.
5 March	John C. Spencer	Liberty ship	Todd Houston Shipbuilding Corporation	Houston, Texas	United States	For War Shipping Administration.
5 March	Scottish Monarch	Cargo ship	Caledon Shipbuilding & Engineering Co. Ltd.	Dundee	United Kingdom	For Monarch Steamship Co. Ltd.
5 March	William D. Moseley	Liberty ship	North Carolina Shipbuilding Company	Wilmington, North Carolina	United States	For War Shipping Administration.
6 March	Astoria	Cleveland-class light cruiser	William Cramp & Sons	Philadelphia	United States	
6 March	Lucius Q. C. Lamar	Liberty ship	Delta Shipbuilding	New Orleans, Louisiana	United States	For War Shipping Administration.
6 March	Margaret Fuller	Liberty ship	California Shipbuilding Corporation	Los Angeles, California	United States	For War Shipping Administration.
6 March	Rippingham Grange	Cargo ship	R. & W. Hawthorn, Leslie and Co. Ltd.	Newcastle upon Tyne	United Kingdom	For Houlder Line Ltd.
6 March	TID 2	TID-class tug	Richard Dunston Ltd.	Thorne	United Kingdom	For the War Department.
6 March	William Osler	Liberty ship	Bethlehem Fairfield Shipyard	Baltimore, Maryland	United States	For War Shipping Administration.
6 March	William Wilkins	Liberty ship	Todd Houston Shipbuilding Corporation	Houston, Texas	United States	For War Shipping Administration.
7 March	Amos Kendall	Liberty ship	Oregon Shipbuilding Corporation	Portland, Oregon	United States	For War Shipping Administration.
7 March	Ezra Cornell	Liberty ship	New England Shipbuilding Corporation	South Portland, Maine	United States	For War Shipping Administration.
7 March	Francis Amasa Walker	Liberty ship	New England Shipbuilding Corporation	South Portland, Maine	United States	For War Shipping Administration.
7 March	Timothy Dwight	Liberty ship	New England Shipbuilding Corporation	South Portland, Maine	United States	For War Shipping Administration.
8 March	Empire Alliance	Norwegian type tanker	Sir J. Laing & Sons Ltd.	Sunderland	United Kingdom	For Ministry of War Transport.
8 March	Empire Cheer	Cargo ship	William Doxford & Sons Ltd	Sunderland	United Kingdom	For Ministry of War Transport
8 March	Empire Farmer	Cargo ship	Sir W G Armstrong, Whitworth & Co (Shipbuilders) Ltd	Newcastle upon Tyne	United Kingdom	For Ministry of War Transport
8 March	Empire Mascot	Near-Warrior type tug	Henry Scarr Ltd.	Hessle	United Kingdom	For Ministry of War Transport.
8 March	Southwind	Wind-class icebreaker	Western Pipe and Steel Company	San Pedro, California	United States	
6 March	William B. Allison	Liberty ship	California Shipbuilding Corporation	Los Angeles, California	United States	For War Shipping Administration.
9 March	Belva Lockwood	Liberty ship	Oregon Shipbuilding Corporation	Portland, Oregon	United States	For War Shipping Administration.
9 March	David L. Swain	Liberty ship	North Carolina Shipbuilding Company	Wilmington, North Carolina	United States	For War Shipping Administration.
9 March	Empire Trumpet	Cargo ship	William Hamilton & Co. Ltd.	Port Glasgow	United Kingdom	For the Ministry of War Transport.
9 March	Henry Gilbert Costin	Liberty ship	Bethlehem Fairfield Shipyard	Baltimore, Maryland	United States	For War Shipping Administration.
9 March	Ninella	Tanker	Blythswood Shipbuilding Co. Ltd.	Glasgow	United Kingdom	For Anglo-Saxon Petroleum Co. Ltd.
10 March	Ansel Briggs	Liberty ship	California Shipbuilding Corporation	Los Angeles, California	United States	For War Shipping Administration.
10 March	Empire Perdita	Cargo ship	John Readhead & Sons Ltd.	South Shields	United Kingdom	For Ministry of War Transport.
10 March	Johns Hopkins	Liberty ship	Bethlehem Fairfield Shipyard	Baltimore, Maryland	United States	For War Shipping Administration.
10 March	William H. Welch	Liberty ship	Bethlehem Fairfield Shipyard	Baltimore, Maryland	United States	For War Shipping Administration.
11 March	Arickaree	T2 Tanker	Alabama Drydock and Shipbuilding Company	Mobile, Alabama	United States	For War Shipping Administration.
11 March	Clifford D. Mallory	Liberty ship	Bethlehem Fairfield Shipyard	Baltimore, Maryland	United States	For War Shipping Administration.
11 March	Kenneth A. J. MacKenzie	Liberty ship	Oregon Shipbuilding Corporation	Portland, Oregon	United States	For War Shipping Administration.
11 March	MOWT 9	Crane barge	Fleming & Ferguson Ltd.	Paisley	United Kingdom	For Ministry of War Transport.
11 March	Nathaniel Currier	Liberty ship	Permanente Metals Corporation	Richmond, California	United States	For War Shipping Administration.
12 March	Alice F. Palmer	Liberty ship	California Shipbuilding Corporation	Los Angeles, California	United States	For War Shipping Administration.
12 March	Jacques Laramie	Liberty ship	Permanente Metals Corporation	Richmond, California	United States	For War Shipping Administration.
12 March	Jonathan Worth	Liberty ship	North Carolina Shipbuilding Company	Wilmington, North Carolina	United States	For War Shipping Administration.
13 March	Elias Boudinot	Liberty ship	Delta Shipbuilding	New Orleans, Louisiana	United States	For War Shipping Administration.
13 March	Henry H. Richardson	Liberty ship	Permanente Metals Corporation	Richmond, California	United States	For War Shipping Administration.
13 March	Lucretia Mott	Liberty ship	Oregon Shipbuilding Corporation	Portland, Oregon	United States	For War Shipping Administration.
13 March	Lucy Stone	Liberty ship	Permanente Metals Corporation	Richmond, California	United States	For War Shipping Administration.
13 March	James M. Wayne	Liberty ship	J. A. Jones Construction Co.	Brunswick, Georgia	United States	For War Shipping Administration.
14 March	Ponce De Leon	Liberty ship	St. Johns River Shipbuilding Company	Jacksonville, Florida	United States	For War Shipping Administration.
14 March	Richard Hovey	Liberty ship	New England Shipbuilding Corporation	South Portland, Maine	United States	For War Shipping Administration.
15 March	James M. Goodhue	Liberty ship	California Shipbuilding Corporation	Los Angeles, California	United States	For War Shipping Administration.
15 March	Matthew T. Goldsboro	Liberty ship	North Carolina Shipbuilding Company	Wilmington, North Carolina	United States	For War Shipping Administration.
15 March	Pierre Gibault	Liberty ship	Oregon Shipbuilding Corporation	Portland, Oregon	United States	For War Shipping Administration.
16 March	Fitzhugh Lee	Liberty ship	Todd Houston Shipbuilding Corporation	Houston, Texas	United States	For War Shipping Administration.
16 March	Frances E. Willard	Liberty ship	Permanente Metals Corporation	Richmond, California	United States	For War Shipping Administration.
16 March	Henry H. Sibley	Liberty ship	California Shipbuilding Corporation	Los Angeles, California	United States	For War Shipping Administration.
16 March	TID 3	TID-class tug	Richard Dunston Ltd.	Thorne	United Kingdom	For the Admiralty.
16 March	William S. Haisted	Liberty ship	Bethlehem Fairfield Shipyard	Baltimore, Maryland	United States	For War Shipping Administration.
17 March	Benjamin H. Grierson	Liberty ship	Oregon Shipbuilding Corporation	Portland, Oregon	United States	For War Shipping Administration.
17 March	Henry H. Rice	Liberty ship	California Shipbuilding Corporation	Los Angeles, California	United States	For War Shipping Administration.
17 March	Timothy Bloodworth	Liberty ship	Delta Shipbuilding	New Orleans, Louisiana	United States	For War Shipping Administration.
18 March	Elisha Mitchell	Liberty ship	North Carolina Shipbuilding Company	Wilmington, North Carolina	United States	For War Shipping Administration.
18 March	Empire Miranda	Cargo ship	Lithgows Ltd.	Port Glasgow	United Kingdom	For Ministry of War Transport.
18 March	Howard A. Kelly	Liberty ship	Bethlehem Fairfield Shipyard	Baltimore, Maryland	United States	For War Shipping Administration.
18 March	James Ives	Liberty ship	Permanente Metals Corporation	Richmond, California	United States	For War Shipping Administration.
18 March	Socotra	Cargo ship	Barclay, Curle & Co. Ltd.	Glasgow	United Kingdom	For British India Steam Navigation Company.
19 March	Betsy Ross	Liberty ship	Permanente Metals Corporation	Richmond, California	United States	For War Shipping Administration.
19 March	Elijah P. Lovejoy	Liberty ship	Oregon Shipbuilding Corporation	Portland, Oregon	United States	For War Shipping Administration.
19 March	John Howland	Liberty ship	Bethlehem Fairfield Shipyard	Baltimore, Maryland	United States	For War Shipping Administration.
19 March	John S. Pillsbury	Liberty ship	California Shipbuilding Corporation	Los Angeles, California	United States	For War Shipping Administration.
19 March	Jubal A. Early	Liberty ship	Todd Houston Shipbuilding Corporation	Houston, Texas	United States	For War Shipping Administration.
19 March	Robert Toombs	Liberty ship	Southeastern Shipbuilding Corporation	Savannah, Georgia	United States	For War Shipping Administration.
20 March	Rinaldo	Algerine-class minesweeper	Harland & Wolff	Belfast	United Kingdom	For Royal Navy.
21 March	Abigail Adams	Liberty ship	Permanente Metals Corporation	Richmond, California	United States	For War Shipping Administration.
21 March	Christopher Gale	Liberty ship	North Carolina Shipbuilding Company	Wilmington, North Carolina	United States	For War Shipping Administration.
21 March	Godavari	Black Swan-class sloop			India	
21 March	Graham Taylor	Liberty ship	Oregon Shipbuilding Corporation	Portland, Oregon	United States	For War Shipping Administration.
21 March	Nacella	Tanker	Swan, Hunter & Wigham Richardson Ltd.	Wallsend	United Kingdom	For Anglo-Saxon Petroleum Co. Ltd.
21 March	Thomas Corwin	Liberty ship	Permanente Metals Corporation	Richmond, California	United States	For War Shipping Administration.
22 March	Edisto	Bogue-class escort carrier	Seattle-Tacoma Shipyard	Tacoma, Washington	United States	Converted C3 merchant freighter for Lend-Lease as HMS Nabob
22 March	Knute Nelson	Liberty ship	California Shipbuilding Corporation	Los Angeles, California	United States	For War Shipping Administration.
22 March	Stanridge	Cargo ship	William Pickersgill & Co. Ltd.	Southwick	United Kingdom	For Stanhope Steamship Co. Ltd.
23 March	Albert B. Cummins	Liberty ship	Oregon Shipbuilding Corporation	Portland, Oregon	United States	For War Shipping Administration.
23 March	British Patience	Tanker	Harland & Wolff Ltd.	Govan	United Kingdom	For British Tanker Co. Ltd.
23 March	Chinese Prince	Cargo ship	J. L. Thompson & Sons Ltd.	Sunderland	United Kingdom	For Prince Line Ltd.
23 March	James B. Weaver	Liberty ship	California Shipbuilding Corporation	Los Angeles, California	United States	For War Shipping Administration.
23 March	Samanco	Cargo ship	Harland & Wolff	Belfast	United Kingdom	For Pacific Steam Navigation Company.
24 March	David Dudley Field	Liberty ship	Permanente Metals Corporation	Richmond, California	United States	For War Shipping Administration.
24 March	Empire Jessica	Scandinavian type cargo ship	Ailsa Shipbuilding & Co. Ltd.	Troon	United Kingdom	For Ministry of War Transport.
23 March	James W. Grimes	Liberty ship	Oregon Shipbuilding Corporation	Portland, Oregon	United States	For War Shipping Administration.
24 March	John J. Abel	Liberty ship	Bethlehem Fairfield Shipyard	Baltimore, Maryland	United States	For War Shipping Administration.
24 March	William L. Davidson	Liberty ship	North Carolina Shipbuilding Company	Wilmington, North Carolina	United States	For War Shipping Administration.
25 March	David Starr Jordan	Liberty ship	Permanente Metals Corporation	Richmond, California	United States	For War Shipping Administration.
25 March	Lafian	Cargo ship	Furness Shipbuilding Co Ltd	Haverton Hill-on-Tees	United Kingdom	For United Africa Co. Ltd.
25 March	TID 4	TID-class tug	Richard Dunston Ltd.	Thorne	United Kingdom	For the Admiralty.
25 March	William H. Wilmer	Liberty ship	Bethlehem Fairfield Shipyard	Baltimore, Maryland	United States	For War Shipping Administration.
26 March	Franklin P. Mall	Liberty ship	Bethlehem Fairfield Shipyard	Baltimore, Maryland	United States	For War Shipping Administration.
26 March	George L. Baker	Liberty ship	Oregon Shipbuilding Corporation	Portland, Oregon	United States	For War Shipping Administration.
26 March	James Guthrie	Liberty ship	Permanente Metals Corporation	Richmond, California	United States	For War Shipping Administration.
26 March	Simon Newcomb	Liberty ship	California Shipbuilding Corporation	Los Angeles, California	United States	For War Shipping Administration.
26 March	Sun Yat Sen	Liberty ship	Marinship Corporation	Sausalito, California	United States	For United States Maritime Commission.
27 March	Aedanus Burke	Liberty ship	Delta Shipbuilding	New Orleans, Louisiana	United States	For War Shipping Administration.
27 March	Amy Lowell	Liberty ship	California Shipbuilding Corporation	Los Angeles, California	United States	For War Shipping Administration.
27 March	Chief Joseph	Liberty ship	Oregon Shipbuilding Corporation	Portland, Oregon	United States	For War Shipping Administration.
27 March	Empire Coppice	Coastal tanker	A & J Inglis Ltd.	Glasgow	United Kingdom	For Ministry of War Transport.
27 March	Arturo	Ariete-class torpedo boat	Cantieri Riuniti dell'Adriatico	Trieste	Italy	Built for Regia Marina but taken over by Germany as TA24
27 March	John Banyard	Liberty ship	Bethlehem Fairfield Shipyard	Baltimore, Maryland	United States	For War Shipping Administration.
27 March	John Gorrie	Liberty ship	St. Johns River Shipbuilding Company	Jacksonville, Florida	United States	For War Shipping Administration.
28 March	Elizabeth Blackwell	Liberty ship	Permanente Metals Corporation	Richmond, California	United States	For War Shipping Administration.
28 March	John Sullivan	Liberty ship	New England Shipbuilding Corporation	South Portland, Maine	United States	For War Shipping Administration.
14 March	Robert M. T. Hunter	Liberty ship	Southeastern Shipbuilding Corporation	Savannah, Georgia	United States	For War Shipping Administration.
28 March	Walker Taylor	Liberty ship	North Carolina Shipbuilding Company	Wilmington, North Carolina	United States	For War Shipping Administration.
29 March	Henry W. Corbett	Liberty ship	Oregon Shipbuilding Corporation	Portland, Oregon	United States	For War Shipping Administration.
29 March	Richard S. Ewell	Liberty ship	Todd Houston Shipbuilding Corporation	Houston, Texas	United States	For War Shipping Administration.
29 March	Samuel Dexter	Liberty ship	Delta Shipbuilding	New Orleans, Louisiana	United States	For War Shipping Administration.
29 March	William G. Fargo	Liberty ship	California Shipbuilding Corporation	Los Angeles, California	United States	For War Shipping Administration.
30 March	Howell Cobb	Liberty ship	Permanente Metals Corporation	Richmond, California	United States	For War Shipping Administration.
30 March	Santiago Iglesias	Liberty ship	Bethlehem Fairfield Shipyard	Baltimore, Maryland	United States	For War Shipping Administration.
31 March	Birch Coolie	T2 Tanker	Alabama Drydock and Shipbuilding Company	Mobile, Alabama	United States	For War Shipping Administration.
31 March	Edward N. Hurley	Liberty ship	Bethlehem Fairfield Shipyard	Baltimore, Maryland	United States	For War Shipping Administration.
31 March	George E. Pickett	Liberty ship	Todd Houston Shipbuilding Corporation	Houston, Texas	United States	For War Shipping Administration.
31 March	George Flavel	Liberty ship	Oregon Shipbuilding Corporation	Portland, Oregon	United States	For War Shipping Administration.
31 March	John Bascomb	Liberty ship	J. A. Jones Construction Company	Panama City, Florida	United States	For War Shipping Administration.
31 March	Roger Moore	Liberty ship	North Carolina Shipbuilding Company	Wilmington, North Carolina	United States	For War Shipping Administration.
31 March	S. Hall Young	Liberty ship	Permanente Metals Corporation	Richmond, California	United States	For War Shipping Administration.
31 March	Westwind	Wind-class icebreaker	Western Pipe and Steel Company	San Pedro, California	United States	
31 March	William James	Liberty ship	California Shipbuilding Corporation	Los Angeles, California	United States	For War Shipping Administration.

== April ==
Date	Ship	Class	Builder	Location	Country	Notes
1 April	Cable	Diver-class rescue and salvage ship	Basalt Rock Company	Napa, California	United States	
1 April	John H. Couch	Liberty ship	Oregon Shipbuilding Corporation	Portland, Oregon	United States	For War Shipping Administration.
1 April	Preserver	Diver-class rescue and salvage ship	Basalt Rock Company	Napa, California	United States	
1 April	Shackle	Diver-class rescue and salvage ship	Basalt Rock Company	Napa, California	United States	
1 April	TID 5	TID-class tug	Richard Dunston Ltd.	Thorne	United Kingdom	For Ministry of War Transport.
2 April	Jacques Cartier	Liberty ship	California Shipbuilding Corporation	Los Angeles, California	United States	For War Shipping Administration.
2 April	J. H. Kincaid	Liberty ship	Permanente Metals Corporation	Richmond, California	United States	For War Shipping Administration.
3 April	Chain	Diver-class rescue and salvage ship	Basalt Rock Company	Napa, California	United States	
3 April	Empire Mountain	Scandinavian type cargo ship	William Gray & Co. Ltd.	West Hartlepool	United Kingdom	For Ministry of War Transport.
3 April	George H. Flanders	Liberty ship	Oregon Shipbuilding Corporation	Portland, Oregon	United States	For War Shipping Administration.
3 April	Rosario	Algerine-class minesweeper	Harland & Wolff	Belfast	United Kingdom	For Royal Navy.
3 April	Stawell	Bathurst-class corvette	HMA Naval Dockyard	Williamstown, Victoria	Australia	
4 April	Alexander Baranof	Liberty ship	Permanente Metals Corporation	Richmond, California	United States	For War Shipping Administration.
4 April	Bernard N. Baker	Liberty ship	Bethlehem Fairfield Shipyard	Baltimore, Maryland	United States	For War Shipping Administration.
4 April	Cabot	Independence-class light aircraft carrier	New York Shipbuilding Corporation	Camden, New Jersey	United States	Converted cruiser hull
5 April	Benjamin N. Cardozo	Liberty ship	California Shipbuilding Corporation	Los Angeles, California	United States	For War Shipping Administration.
5 April	Casablanca	Casablanca-class escort carrier	Kaiser Shipyards	Vancouver, Washington	United States	Converted S4 merchant hull
5 April	Emma Willard	Liberty ship	New England Shipbuilding Corporation	South Portland, Maine	United States	For War Shipping Administration.
5 April	Empire Judy	Coaster	S. P. Austin & Sons Ltd.	Sunderland	United Kingdom	For Ministry of War Transport.
5 April	Francis W. Pettygrove	Liberty ship	Oregon Shipbuilding Corporation	Portland, Oregon	United States	For War Shipping Administration.
5 April	Hugh McCulloch	Liberty ship	Permanente Metals Corporation	Richmond, California	United States	For War Shipping Administration.
5 April	Joseph Warren	Liberty ship	New England Shipbuilding Corporation	South Portland, Maine	United States	For War Shipping Administration.
5 April	Stanford White	Liberty ship	California Shipbuilding Corporation	Los Angeles, California	United States	For War Shipping Administration.
5 April	William N. Pendleton	Liberty ship	Todd Houston Shipbuilding Corporation	Houston, Texas	United States	For War Shipping Administration.
6 April	Robert Rowan	Liberty ship	North Carolina Shipbuilding Company	Wilmington, North Carolina	United States	For War Shipping Administration.
6 April	Samuel Gorton	Liberty ship	Walsh-Kaiser Company	Providence, Rhode Island	United States	For War Shipping Administration.
6 April	Thomas Fitzsimons	Liberty ship	Delta Shipbuilding	New Orleans, Louisiana	United States	For War Shipping Administration.
7 April	Charles M. Schwab	Liberty ship	Bethlehem Fairfield Shipyard	Baltimore, Maryland	United States	For War Shipping Administration.
7 April	George D. Prentice	Liberty ship	Permanente Metals Corporation	Richmond, California	United States	For War Shipping Administration.
7 April	Henry Failing	Liberty ship	Oregon Shipbuilding Corporation	Portland, Oregon	United States	For War Shipping Administration.
7 April	Sheledon Jackson	Liberty ship	Permanente Metals Corporation	Richmond, California	United States	For War Shipping Administration.
7 April	William B. Woods	Liberty ship	J. A. Jones Construction Co.	Brunswick, Georgia	United States	For War Shipping Administration.
7 April	William Carson	Liberty ship	California Shipbuilding Corporation	Los Angeles, California	United States	For War Shipping Administration.
7 April	Winfred L. Smith	Liberty ship	Bethlehem Fairfield Shipyard	Baltimore, Maryland	United States	For War Shipping Administration.
8 April	British Restraint	Tanker	Cammell Laird & Co. Ltd.	Birkenhead	United Kingdom	For British Tanker Co. Ltd.
8 April	John Chandler	Liberty ship	New England Shipbuilding Corporation	South Portland, Maine	United States	For War Shipping Administration.
8 April	Empire Beauty	Cargo ship	William Doxford & Sons	Sunderland	United Kingdom	For Ministry of War Transport
8 April	Empire Falstaff	Cargo ship	Lithgows Ltd.	Port Glasgow	United Kingdom	For Ministry of War Transport.
8 April	Empire Judy	Coaster	S P Austin & Sons Ltd	Sunderland	United Kingdom	For Ministry of War Transport
8 April	Empire Manor	Cargo ship	Short Brothers Ltd.	Sunderland	United Kingdom	For Ministry of War Transport.
8 April	Empire Viceroy	Heavy lift ship	Vickers-Armstrongs Ltd.	Barrow in Furness	United Kingdom	For Ministry of War Transport.
8 April	Huntington	Fargo-class light cruiser	New York Shipbuilding Corporation	Camden, New Jersey	United States	
8 April	Empire Samson	Modified Warrior-type tug	Goole Shipbuilding & Repairing Co. Ltd.	Goole	United Kingdom	For Ministry of War Transport.
8 April	Empire Falstaff	Cargo ship	Lithgows Ltd	Glasgow	United Kingdom	For Ministry of War Transport
8 April	Trevelyan	Cargo ship	William Doxford & Sons Ltd.	Pallion	United Kingdom	For Hain Steamship Co. Ltd.
9 April	B. F. Shaw	Liberty ship	Oregon Shipbuilding Corporation	Portland, Oregon	United States	For War Shipping Administration.
9 April	Luther Burbank	Liberty ship	Permanente Metals Corporation	Richmond, California	United States	For War Shipping Administration.
9 April	Thomas W. Bickett	Liberty ship	North Carolina Shipbuilding Company	Wilmington, North Carolina	United States	For War Shipping Administration.
10 April	Charles H. Windham	Liberty ship	California Shipbuilding Corporation	Los Angeles, California	United States	For War Shipping Administration.
10 April	Charles Piez	Liberty ship	Bethlehem Fairfield Shipyard	Baltimore, Maryland	United States	For War Shipping Administration.
10 April	Crawford W. Long	Liberty ship	Southeastern Shipbuilding Corporation	Savannah, Georgia	United States	For War Shipping Administration.
10 April	Moses Austin	Liberty ship	Todd Houston Shipbuilding Corporation	Houston, Texas	United States	For War Shipping Administration.
10 April	Tarleton Brown	Liberty ship	Delta Shipbuilding	New Orleans, Louisiana	United States	For War Shipping Administration.
10 April	TID 6	TID-class tug	Richard Dunston Ltd.	Thorne	United Kingdom	For the Admiralty Ministry of War Transport.
11 April	George M. Pullman	Liberty ship	Permanente Metals Corporation	Richmond, California	United States	For War Shipping Administration.
11 April	Simon Bolivar	Liberty ship	Oregon Shipbuilding Corporation	Portland, Oregon	United States	For War Shipping Administration.
12 April	Horace Williams	Liberty ship	North Carolina Shipbuilding Company	Wilmington, North Carolina	United States	For War Shipping Administration.
12 April	Juan Flaco Brown	Liberty ship	California Shipbuilding Corporation	Los Angeles, California	United States	For War Shipping Administration.
13 April	Bushrod Washington	Liberty ship	Bethlehem Fairfield Shipyard	Baltimore, Maryland	United States	For War Shipping Administration.
13 April	Louis Agassiz	Liberty ship	Oregon Shipbuilding Corporation	Portland, Oregon	United States	For War Shipping Administration.
13 April	Thaddeus S. C. Lowe	Liberty ship	California Shipbuilding Corporation	Los Angeles, California	United States	For War Shipping Administration.
13 April	William Strong	Liberty ship	Bethlehem Fairfield Shipyard	Baltimore, Maryland	United States	For War Shipping Administration.
14 April	Benito Juarez	Liberty ship	Todd Houston Shipbuilding Corporation	Houston, Texas	United States	For War Shipping Administration.
14 April	Edward Bellamy	Liberty ship	Oregon Shipbuilding Corporation	Portland, Oregon	United States	For War Shipping Administration.
14 April	Jose Bonifacio	Liberty ship	North Carolina Shipbuilding Company	Wilmington, North Carolina	United States	For War Shipping Administration.
14 April	Miguel Hidalgo	Liberty ship	California Shipbuilding Corporation	Los Angeles, California	United States	For War Shipping Administration.
14 April	Wilbur Wright	Liberty ship	Permanente Metals Corporation	Richmond, California	United States	For War Shipping Administration.
15 April	Charles Sumner	Liberty ship	New England Shipbuilding Corporation	South Portland, Maine	United States	For War Shipping Administration.
15 April	Levis Woodbury	Liberty ship	Bethlehem Fairfield Shipyard	Baltimore, Maryland	United States	For War Shipping Administration.
15 April	William Phips	Liberty ship	New England Shipbuilding Corporation	South Portland, Maine	United States	For War Shipping Administration.
16 April	Cass Gilbert	Liberty ship	Oregon Shipbuilding Corporation	Portland, Oregon	United States	For War Shipping Administration.
16 April	Henry Groves Connor	Liberty ship	Delta Shipbuilding	New Orleans, Louisiana	United States	For War Shipping Administration.
16 April	Josiah D. Whitney	Liberty ship	California Shipbuilding Corporation	Los Angeles, California	United States	For War Shipping Administration.
16 April	TID 7	TID-class tug	Richard Dunston Ltd.	Thorne	United Kingdom	For the Admiralty.
16 April	William Thornton	Liberty ship	Permanente Metals Corporation	Richmond, California	United States	For War Shipping Administration.
17 April	David G. Burnet	Liberty ship	Todd Houston Shipbuilding Corporation	Houston, Texas	United States	For War Shipping Administration.
17 April	Francis Asbury	Liberty ship	St. Johns River Shipbuilding Company	Jacksonville, Florida	United States	For War Shipping Administration.
17 April	Homer Lea	Liberty ship	Permanente Metals Corporation	Richmond, California	United States	For War Shipping Administration.
17 April	Joseph P. Bradley	Liberty ship	Bethlehem Fairfield Shipyard	Baltimore, Maryland	United States	For War Shipping Administration.
17 April	Thomas L. Clingman	Liberty ship	North Carolina Shipbuilding Company	Wilmington, North Carolina	United States	For War Shipping Administration.
17 April	William M. Gwin	Liberty ship	California Shipbuilding Corporation	Los Angeles, California	United States	For War Shipping Administration.
18 April	Glen Curtiss	Liberty ship	Permanente Metals Corporation	Richmond, California	United States	For War Shipping Administration.
18 April	Gouverneur Morris	Liberty ship	Oregon Shipbuilding Corporation	Portland, Oregon	United States	For War Shipping Administration.
18 April	John Holmes	Liberty ship	New England Shipbuilding Corporation	South Portland, Maine	United States	For War Shipping Administration.
18 April	Mark Keppel	Liberty ship	California Shipbuilding Corporation	Los Angeles, California	United States	For War Shipping Administration.
18 April	William A. Jones	Liberty ship	Permanente Metals Corporation	Richmond, California	United States	For War Shipping Administration.
19 April	Canberra	Baltimore-class heavy cruiser	Fore River Shipyard	Quincy, MA	United States	
19 April	David Caldwell	Liberty ship	North Carolina Shipbuilding Company	Wilmington, North Carolina	United States	For War Shipping Administration.
19 April	Liscome Bay	Casablanca-class escort carrier	Kaiser Shipyards	Vancouver, Washington	United States	Converted S4 merchant hull
20 April	Denewood	Cargo ship	J. L. Thompson & Sons Ltd.	Sunderland	United Kingdom	For John I. Jacobs & Co. Ltd.
20 April	Empire Glory	Cargo ship	Burntisland Shipbuilding Company	Burntisland	United Kingdom	For Ministry of War Transport.
20 April	George Eastman	Liberty ship	Permanente Metals Corporation	Richmond, California	United States	For War Shipping Administration.
20 April;	Gilbert Stuart	Liberty ship	Oregon Shipbuilding Corporation	Portland, Oregon	United States	For War Shipping Administration.
20 April	Spanker	Algerine-class minesweeper	Harland & Wolff	Belfast	United Kingdom	For Royal Navy.
21 April	Empire Citizen	Icemaid type collier	Grangemouth Dockyard Co. Ltd.	Grangemouth	United Kingdom	For Ministry of War Transport.
21 April	Empire Florizel	Cargo ship	Lithgows Ltd	Greenock	United Kingdom	For Ministry of War Transport
21 April	Empire John	Larch-class tug	Clelands (Successors) Ltd.	Wallsend	United Kingdom	For the Admiralty.
21 April	Jamaica	Bogue-class escort carrier	Seattle-Tacoma Shipyard	Tacoma, WA	United States	Converted C3 merchant freighter for Lend-Lease as HMS Shah
21 April	James E. Howard	Liberty ship	Delta Shipbuilding	New Orleans, Louisiana	United States	For War Shipping Administration.
21 April	Wiley Post	Liberty ship	California Shipbuilding Corporation	Los Angeles, California	United States	For War Shipping Administration.
22 April	DeWitt Clinton	Liberty ship	Oregon Shipbuilding Corporation	Portland, Oregon	United States	For War Shipping Administration.
22 April	Empire Griffin	Modified Warrior-type tug	Scott & Sons Ltd.	Bowling	United Kingdom	For Ministry of War Transport.
22 April	Empire Inventor	Norwegian type tanker	Sir J. Laing & Sons Ltd.	Sunderland	United Kingdom	For .
22 April	Empire Rock	Cargo ship	Bartram & Sons Ltd	Sunderland	United Kingdom	For Ministry of War Transport.
22 April	George Gershwin	Liberty ship	California Shipbuilding Corporation	Los Angeles, California	United States	For War Shipping Administration.
22 April	John C. Breckinridge	Liberty ship	Southeastern Shipbuilding Corporation	Savannah, Georgia	United States	For War Shipping Administration.
22 April	John Woolman	Liberty ship	Bethlehem Fairfield Shipyard	Baltimore, Maryland	United States	For War Shipping Administration.
22 April	Kistna	Modified Black Swan-class sloop			India	
22 April	Lyman Abbott	Liberty ship	Walsh-Kaiser Company	Providence, Rhode Island	United States	For War Shipping Administration.
22 April	Waigstil Avery	Liberty ship	North Carolina Shipbuilding Company	Wilmington, North Carolina	United States	For War Shipping Administration.
22 April	William J. Bryan	Liberty ship	J. A. Jones Construction Company	Panama City, Florida	United States	For War Shipping Administration.
22 April	William M. Evarts	Liberty ship	Delta Shipbuilding	New Orleans, Louisiana	United States	For War Shipping Administration.
23 April	Cyrus W. Field	Liberty ship	Permanente Metals Corporation	Richmond, California	United States	For War Shipping Administration.
23 April	General Vallejo	Liberty ship	California Shipbuilding Corporation	Los Angeles, California	United States	For War Shipping Administration.
23 April	James S. Hogg	Liberty ship	Todd Houston Shipbuilding Corporation	Houston, Texas	United States	For War Shipping Administration.
23 April	MMS 281	MMS-class minesweeper	J. Bolson & Son Ltd.	Poole	United Kingdom	For Royal Navy.
23 April	Richard Harding Davis	Liberty ship	Oregon Shipbuilding Corporation	Portland, Oregon	United States	For War Shipping Administration.
23 April	TID 8	TID-class tug	Richard Dunston Ltd.	Thorne	United Kingdom	For the Admiralty.
23 April	Ward Hunt	Liberty ship	Bethlehem Fairfield Shipyard	Baltimore, Maryland	United States	For War Shipping Administration.
24 April	Anson Burlingame	Liberty ship	Permanente Metals Corporation	Richmond, California	United States	For War Shipping Administration.
24 April	Buffalo Wallow	T2 Tanker	Alabama Drydock and Shipbuilding Company	Mobile, Alabama	United States	For War Shipping Administration.
24 April	Cornelia P. Spencer	Liberty ship	North Carolina Shipbuilding Company	Wilmington, North Carolina	United States	For War Shipping Administration.
24 April	Curb	Diver-class rescue and salvage ship	Basalt Rock Company	Napa, California	United States	
24 April	Henry S. Foote	Liberty ship	Delta Shipbuilding	New Orleans, Louisiana	United States	For War Shipping Administration.
24 April	William Pepper	Liberty ship	Bethlehem Fairfield Shipyard	Baltimore, Maryland	United States	For War Shipping Administration.
25 April	Escambier	T2 tanker	Marinship Corporation	Sausalito, California	United States	For United States Maritime Commission.
25 April	Isaac Babbitt	Liberty ship	Permanente Metals Corporation	Richmond, California	United States	For War Shipping Administration.
25 April	William H. McGuffey	Liberty ship	Oregon Shipbuilding Corporation	Portland, Oregon	United States	For War Shipping Administration.
26 April	Andrew Rowan	Liberty ship	California Shipbuilding Corporation	Los Angeles, California	United States	For War Shipping Administration.
26 April	Emily Dickinson	Liberty ship	New England Shipbuilding Corporation	South Portland, Maine	United States	For War Shipping Administration.
26 April	Intrepid	Essex-class aircraft carrier	Newport News Shipbuilding	Newport News, VA	United States	
26 April	William W. Gerhard	Liberty ship	Bethlehem Fairfield Shipyard	Baltimore, Maryland	United States	For War Shipping Administration.
27 April	Charles E. Duryea	Liberty ship	Permanente Metals Corporation	Richmond, California	United States	For War Shipping Administration.
27 April	Cushman K. Davis	Liberty ship	Oregon Shipbuilding Corporation	Portland, Oregon	United States	For War Shipping Administration.
27 April	Thomas Hill	Liberty ship	California Shipbuilding Corporation	Los Angeles, California	United States	For War Shipping Administration.
27 April	Walter Hines Page	Liberty ship	North Carolina Shipbuilding Company	Wilmington, North Carolina	United States	For War Shipping Administration.
28 April	Edward W. Scripps	Liberty ship	California Shipbuilding Corporation	Los Angeles, California	United States	For War Shipping Administration.
28 April	George L. Shaup	Liberty ship	Oregon Shipbuilding Corporation	Portland, Oregon	United States	For War Shipping Administration.
29 April	James De Wolf	Liberty ship	Walsh-Kaiser Company	Providence, Rhode Island	United States	For War Shipping Administration.
29 April	Joseph R. Lamar	Liberty ship	J. A. Jones Construction Co.	Brunswick, Georgia	United States	For War Shipping Administration.
29 April	Louis Hennepin	Liberty ship	Permanente Metals Corporation	Richmond, California	United States	For War Shipping Administration.
29 April	Silas Weir Mitchell	Liberty ship	Bethlehem Fairfield Shipyard	Baltimore, Maryland	United States	For War Shipping Administration.
30 April	Benjamin D. Wilson	Liberty ship	California Shipbuilding Corporation	Los Angeles, California	United States	For War Shipping Administration.
30 April	Benjamin Holt	Liberty ship	Permanente Metals Corporation	Richmond, California	United States	For War Shipping Administration.
30 April	Iceland	Cargo ship	Caledon Shipbuilding & Engineering Co. Ltd.	Dundee	United Kingdom	For Currie Line Ltd.
30 April	Ignatius Donnelly	Liberty ship	Oregon Shipbuilding Corporation	Portland, Oregon	United States	For War Shipping Administration.
30 April	Jane Long	Liberty ship	Todd Houston Shipbuilding Corporation	Houston, Texas	United States	For War Shipping Administration.
30 April	Joseph A. Brown	Liberty ship	North Carolina Shipbuilding Company	Wilmington, North Carolina	United States	For War Shipping Administration.
30 April	Joseph Leidy	Liberty ship	Bethlehem Fairfield Shipyard	Baltimore, Maryland	United States	For War Shipping Administration.
30 April	Josiah Snelling	Liberty ship	Permanente Metals Corporation	Richmond, California	United States	For War Shipping Administration.
30 April	Sea Scamp	Type C3 troop transport	Ingalls Shipbuilding	Pascagoula, Mississippi	United States	For U.S. Navy

== May ==
Date	Ship	Class	Builder	Location	Country	Notes
1 May	Charles Henderson	Liberty ship	Delta Shipbuilding	New Orleans, Louisiana	United States	For War Shipping Administration.
1 May	Coral Sea	Casablanca-class escort carrier	Kaiser Shipyards	Vancouver, Washington	United States	Converted S4 merchant hull
1 May	F. T. Frelinghuysen	Liberty ship	Delta Shipbuilding	New Orleans, Louisiana	United States	For War Shipping Administration.
2 May	Button Gwinnett	Liberty ship	Southeastern Shipbuilding Corporation	Savannah, Georgia	United States	For War Shipping Administration.
2 May	James R. Randall	Liberty ship	Bethlehem Fairfield Shipyard	Baltimore, Maryland	United States	For War Shipping Administration.
2 May	Joseph Sepulveda	Liberty ship	California Shipbuilding Corporation	Los Angeles, California	United States	For War Shipping Administration.
2 May	Oliver Evans	Liberty ship	Permanente Metals Corporation	Richmond, California	United States	For War Shipping Administration.
2 May	Paparoa	Refrigerated cargo liner	Alexander Stephen & Sons Ltd.	Linthouse	United Kingdom	For New Zealand Shipping Co. Ltd.
2 May	Robert Newell	Liberty ship	Oregon Shipbuilding Corporation	Portland, Oregon	United States	For War Shipping Administration.
3 May	Asa Gray	Liberty ship	New England Shipbuilding Corporation	South Portland, Maine	United States	For War Shipping Administration.
3 May	Cormarsh	Collier	Burntisland Shipbuilding Company	Burntisland	United Kingdom	For Wm. Cory & Son Ltd.
3 May	Empire MacAndrew	MAC ship	William Denny & Bros. Ltd.	Dumbarton	United Kingdom	For Ministry of War Transport.
3 May	Henry Wilson	Liberty ship	New England Shipbuilding Corporation	South Portland, Maine	United States	For War Shipping Administration.
3 May	Joseph M. Medill	Liberty ship	J. A. Jones Construction Company	Panama City, Florida	United States	For War Shipping Administration.
3 May	Mary Lyon	Liberty ship	New England Shipbuilding Corporation	South Portland, Maine	United States	For War Shipping Administration.
4 May	Empire Industry	Ocean type tanker	Harland & Wolff	Belfast	United Kingdom	For Ministry of War Transport.
4 May	Empire Peak	Cargo ship	William Gray & Co. Ltd.	West Hartlepool	United Kingdom	For Ministry of War Transport.
4 May	Ignace Paderewski	Liberty ship	California Shipbuilding Corporation	Los Angeles, California	United States	For War Shipping Administration.
4 May	James B. Bonham	Liberty ship	Todd Houston Shipbuilding Corporation	Houston, Texas	United States	For War Shipping Administration.
4 May	John Morgan	Liberty ship	Bethlehem Fairfield Shipyard	Baltimore, Maryland	United States	For War Shipping Administration.
4 May	Robert F. Hoke	Liberty ship	North Carolina Shipbuilding Company	Wilmington, North Carolina	United States	For War Shipping Administration.
4 May	Stanford Newel	Liberty ship	Oregon Shipbuilding Corporation	Portland, Oregon	United States	For War Shipping Administration.
4 May	TID 9	TID-class tug	Richard Dunston Ltd.	Thorne	United Kingdom	For the Admiralty.
4 May	Trevince	Cargo ship	William Doxford & Sons Ltd.	Pallion	United Kingdom	For Hain Steamship Co. Ltd.
4 May	Vindex	Escort carrier	Swan, Hunter & Wigham Richardson Ltd.	Wallsend	United Kingdom	For Royal Navy.
5 May	Charles Lummis	Liberty ship	California Shipbuilding Corporation	Los Angeles, California	United States	For War Shipping Administration.
5 May	Elisha Graves Otis	Liberty ship	Permanente Metals Corporation	Richmond, California	United States	For War Shipping Administration.
5 May	Thomas W. Hyde	Liberty ship	New England Shipbuilding Corporation	South Portland, Maine	United States	For War Shipping Administration.
5 May	William T. G. Vault	Liberty ship	Oregon Shipbuilding Corporation	Portland, Oregon	United States	For War Shipping Administration.
6 May	Empire Buttress	Scandinavian type cargo ship	William Gray & Co. Ltd.	West Hartlepool	United Kingdom	For Ministry of War Transport.
6 May	Empire Jester	Modified Warrior-type tug	Goole Shipbuilding & Repairing Co. Ltd.	Goole	United Kingdom	For Ministry of War Transport.
6 May	Empire Sara	Near-Warrior type tug	Cochrane & Sons Ltd.	Selby	United Kingdom	For Ministry of War Transport.
6 May	Empire Sportsman	Coaster	Richards Ironworks Ltd.	Lowestoft	United Kingdom	For Ministry of War Transport.
6 May	Keweenaw	Bogue-class escort carrier	Seattle-Tacoma Shipyard	Tacoma, Washington	United States	Converted C3 merchant freighter for Lend-Lease as HMS Patroller
6 May	Knute Rockne	Liberty ship	Permanente Metals Corporation	Richmond, California	United States	For War Shipping Administration.
7 May	Amethyst	Modified Black Swan-class sloop			United Kingdom	
7 May	Empire Sybil	Near-Warrior type tug	Cochrane & Sons Ltd.	Selby	United Kingdom	For Ministry of War Transport.
7 May	George Washington Carver	Liberty ship	Permanente Metals Corporation	Richmond, California	United States	For War Shipping Administration.
7 May	Jedediah S. Smith	Liberty ship	California Shipbuilding Corporation	Los Angeles, California	United States	For War Shipping Administration.
7 May	John J. Crittenden	Liberty ship	St. Johns River Shipbuilding Company	Jacksonville, Florida	United States	For War Shipping Administration.
7 May	Kelmscott	Cargo ship	John Readhead & Sons Ltd.	South Shields	United Kingdom	For Pachesham Steamship Co.
7 May	Sallie S. Cotton	Liberty ship	North Carolina Shipbuilding Company	Wilmington, North Carolina	United States	For War Shipping Administration.
7 May	William H. Gray	Liberty ship	Oregon Shipbuilding Corporation	Portland, Oregon	United States	For War Shipping Administration.
7 May	William H. Webb	Liberty ship	Bethlehem Fairfield Shipyard	Baltimore, Maryland	United States	For War Shipping Administration.
8 May	James J. Corbett	Liberty ship	Permanente Metals Corporation	Richmond, California	United States	For War Shipping Administration.
8 May	Josiah Nelson Cushing	Liberty ship	California Shipbuilding Corporation	Los Angeles, California	United States	For War Shipping Administration.
9 May	Edward Eggleston	Liberty ship	Oregon Shipbuilding Corporation	Portland, Oregon	United States	For War Shipping Administration.
	Kennebago	T2 tanker	Marinship Corporation	Sausalito, California	United States	For United States Maritime Commission.
10 May	James A. Bayard	Liberty ship	Permanente Metals Corporation	Richmond, California	United States	For War Shipping Administration.
10 May	John Burroughs	Liberty ship	California Shipbuilding Corporation	Los Angeles, California	United States	For War Shipping Administration.
10 May	John Owen	Liberty ship	North Carolina Shipbuilding Company	Wilmington, North Carolina	United States	For War Shipping Administration.
10 May	Moses Brown	Liberty ship	Walsh-Kaiser Company	Providence, Rhode Island	United States	For War Shipping Administration.
10 May	Robert Lowry	Liberty ship	Delta Shipbuilding	New Orleans, Louisiana	United States	For War Shipping Administration.
10 May	Thomas A. Hendricks	Liberty ship	Oregon Shipbuilding Corporation	Portland, Oregon	United States	For War Shipping Administration.
10 May	TID 10	TID-class tug	Richard Dunston Ltd.	Thorne	United Kingdom	For the Admiralty.
10 May	Walter Camp	Liberty ship	Permanente Metals Corporation	Richmond, California	United States	For War Shipping Administration.
11 May	Camas Meadows	T2 Tanker	Alabama Drydock and Shipbuilding Company	Mobile, Alabama	United States	For War Shipping Administration.
11 May	Charles Crocker	Liberty ship	California Shipbuilding Corporation	Los Angeles, California	United States	For War Shipping Administration.
11 May	Eberhart Essberger	Cargo ship	Öresunds Varve A/B	Landskrona	Sweden	For J T Essberger, Hamburg
11 May	Stevenson Taylor	Liberty ship	Bethlehem Fairfield Shipyard	Baltimore, Maryland	United States	For War Shipping Administration.
12 May	Charles A. McAllister	Liberty ship	Bethlehem Fairfield Shipyard	Baltimore, Maryland	United States	For War Shipping Administration.
12 May	Corregidor	Casablanca-class escort carrier	Kaiser Shipyards	Vancouver, Washington	United States	Converted S4 merchant hull
12 May	Felix Grundy	Liberty ship	Southeastern Shipbuilding Corporation	Savannah, Georgia	United States	For War Shipping Administration.
12 May	Hobart Baker	Liberty ship	Permanente Metals Corporation	Richmond, California	United States	For War Shipping Administration.
12 May	James W. Fannin	Liberty ship	Todd Houston Shipbuilding Corporation	Houston, Texas	United States	For War Shipping Administration.
12 May	Jonathan Jennings	Liberty ship	Oregon Shipbuilding Corporation	Portland, Oregon	United States	For War Shipping Administration.
13 May	Elbert Hubbard	Liberty ship	Bethlehem Fairfield Shipyard	Baltimore, Maryland	United States	For War Shipping Administration.
13 May	Eugene Field	Liberty ship	New England Shipbuilding Corporation	South Portland, Maine	United States	For War Shipping Administration.
13 May	John S. Casement	Liberty ship	California Shipbuilding Corporation	Los Angeles, California	United States	For War Shipping Administration.
13 May	Philip Doddridge	Liberty ship	North Carolina Shipbuilding Company	Wilmington, North Carolina	United States	For War Shipping Administration.
14 May	Anson Jones	Liberty ship	Todd Houston Shipbuilding Corporation	Houston, Texas	United States	For War Shipping Administration.
14 May	Christy Mathewson	Liberty ship	Permanente Metals Corporation	Richmond, California	United States	For War Shipping Administration.
14 May	George W. Julian	Liberty ship	Oregon Shipbuilding Corporation	Portland, Oregon	United States	For War Shipping Administration.
14 May	P. T. Barnum	Liberty ship	California Shipbuilding Corporation	Los Angeles, California	United States	For War Shipping Administration.
14 May	Samuel Bowles	Liberty ship	Bethlehem Fairfield Shipyard	Baltimore, Maryland	United States	For War Shipping Administration.
15 May	John Grier Hibben	Liberty ship	North Carolina Shipbuilding Company	Wilmington, North Carolina	United States	For War Shipping Administration.
16 May	George Gipp	Liberty ship	Permanente Metals Corporation	Richmond, California	United States	For War Shipping Administration.
16 May	Henry S. Lane	Liberty ship	Oregon Shipbuilding Corporation	Portland, Oregon	United States	For War Shipping Administration.
16 May	John E. Schmeltzer	Liberty ship	Bethlehem Fairfield Shipyard	Baltimore, Maryland	United States	For War Shipping Administration.
16 May	Mary Cassatt	Liberty ship	Permanente Metals Corporation	Richmond, California	United States	For War Shipping Administration.
16 May	Thomas Oliver Larkin	Liberty ship	California Shipbuilding Corporation	Los Angeles, California	United States	For War Shipping Administration.
17 May	Frederick L. Dau	Liberty ship	Todd Houston Shipbuilding Corporation	Houston, Texas	United States	For War Shipping Administration.
17 May	Haym Salomon	Liberty ship	Bethlehem Fairfield Shipyard	Baltimore, Maryland	United States	For War Shipping Administration.
17 May	Julien Poydras	Liberty ship	Delta Shipbuilding	New Orleans, Louisiana	United States	For War Shipping Administration.
17 May	TID 11	TID-class tug	Richard Dunston Ltd.	Thorne	United Kingdom	For the War Department.
18 May	Avonmoor	Cargo ship	William Doxford & Sons Ltd.	Pallion	United Kingdom	For Moor Line Ltd.
18 May	Empire MacCabe	MAC tanker	Swan, Hunter & Wigham Richardson Ltd.	Newcastle upon Tyne	United Kingdom	For Ministry of War Transport.
18 May	George Poindexter	Liberty ship	Delta Shipbuilding	New Orleans, Louisiana	United States	For War Shipping Administration.
18 May	Hughli	Cargo ship	Charles Connell & Co Ltd	Glasgow	United Kingdom	For J. Nourse Ltd.
18 May	James Oliver	Liberty ship	Oregon Shipbuilding Corporation	Portland, Oregon	United States	For War Shipping Administration.
18 May	John L. Motley	Liberty ship	Bethlehem Fairfield Shipyard	Baltimore, Maryland	United States	For War Shipping Administration.
18 May	Juan Bautistade Anza	Liberty ship	California Shipbuilding Corporation	Los Angeles, California	United States	For War Shipping Administration.
18 May	Kemp P. Battle	Liberty ship	North Carolina Shipbuilding Company	Wilmington, North Carolina	United States	For War Shipping Administration.
18 May	Matthew B. Brady	Liberty ship	Permanente Metals Corporation	Richmond, California	United States	For War Shipping Administration.
18 May	MOWT 10	Crane barge	Fleming & Ferguson Ltd.	Paisley	United Kingdom	For Ministry of War Transport.
18 May	Prince	Bogue-class escort carrier	Seattle-Tacoma Shipyard	Tacoma, Washington	United States	Converted C3 merchant freighter for Lend-Lease as HMS Rajah
18 May	Telemachus	Cargo ship	Caledon Shipbuilding & Engineering Co. Ltd.	Dundee	United Kingdom	For Ocean Steamship Co.
19 May	Elihu Root	Liberty ship	J. A. Jones Construction Company	Panama City, Florida	United States	For War Shipping Administration.
19 May	Eric V. Hauser	Liberty ship	Oregon Shipbuilding Corporation	Portland, Oregon	United States	For War Shipping Administration.
19 May	Lackawapan	T2 tanker	Marinship Corporation	Sausalito, California	United States	For United States Maritime Commission.
19 May	Michael Pupin	Liberty ship	Permanente Metals Corporation	Richmond, California	United States	For War Shipping Administration.
19 May	Thomas Todd	Liberty ship	J. A. Jones Construction Co.	Brunswick, Georgia	United States	For War Shipping Administration.
20 May	Chiswick	Cargo ship	William Pickersgill & Co. Ltd.	Southwick	United Kingdom	For Watts, Watts & Co. Ltd.
20 May	Edward A. MacDowell	Liberty ship	Permanente Metals Corporation	Richmond, California	United States	For War Shipping Administration.
20 May	Empire Chieftain	Standard Fast type cargo liner	Furness Shipbuilding Ltd	Haverton Hill-on-Tees	United Kingdom	For Ministry of War Transport.
20 May	Empire Service	Cargo ship	Lithgows Ltd.	Port Glasgow	United Kingdom	For Ministry of War Transport.
20 May	Lyman Stewart	Liberty ship	California Shipbuilding Corporation	Los Angeles, California	United States	For War Shipping Administration.
20 May	Nairana	Nairana-class escort carrier	J. & G. Thompson Ltd.	Clydebank	United Kingdom	For Royal Navy.
20 May	Valve	Diver-class rescue and salvage ship	Basalt Rock Company	Napa, California	United States	
21 May	Conrad Weiser	Liberty ship	Bethlehem Fairfield Shipyard	Baltimore, Maryland	United States	For War Shipping Administration.
21 May	John M. T. Finney	Liberty ship	Bethlehem Fairfield Shipyard	Baltimore, Maryland	United States	For War Shipping Administration.
21 May	R. C. Brennan	Liberty ship	Oregon Shipbuilding Corporation	Portland, Oregon	United States	For War Shipping Administration.
21 May	Robert Dale Owen	Liberty ship	North Carolina Shipbuilding Company	Wilmington, North Carolina	United States	For War Shipping Administration.
21 May	Sidney Lanier	Liberty ship	St. Johns River Shipbuilding Company	Jacksonville, Florida	United States	For War Shipping Administration.
21 May	TID 30	TID-class tug	Richard Dunston Ltd.	Thorne	United Kingdom	For the Admiralty Ministry of War Transport.
22 May	George F. Patten	Liberty ship	New England Shipbuilding Corporation	South Portland, Maine	United States	For War Shipping Administration.
22 May	John Alden	Liberty ship	California Shipbuilding Corporation	Los Angeles, California	United States	For War Shipping Administration.
22 May	Langdon Cheves	Liberty ship	Southeastern Shipbuilding Corporation	Savannah, Georgia	United States	For War Shipping Administration.
22 May	Langley	Independence-class light aircraft carrier	New York Shipbuilding Corporation	Camden, NJ	United States	Converted cruiser hull
22 May	Empire Wrestler	Coastal tanker	Grangemouth Dockyard Co Ltd	Grangemouth	United Kingdom	For Ministry of War Transport
22 May	Frederick Douglass	Liberty ship	Bethlehem Fairfield Shipyard	Baltimore, Maryland	United States	For War Shipping Administration.
22 May	Joseph Smith	Liberty ship	Permanente Metals Corporation	Richmond, California	United States	For War Shipping Administration.
23 May	Clarence Darrow	Liberty ship	California Shipbuilding Corporation	Los Angeles, California	United States	For War Shipping Administration.
23 May	Empire Maisie	Near-Warrior type tug	Henry Scarr Ltd.	Hessle	United Kingdom	For Ministry of War Transport.
23 May	Francis E. Warren	Liberty ship	Oregon Shipbuilding Corporation	Portland, Oregon	United States	For War Shipping Administration.
23 May	John P. Mitchell	Liberty ship	North Carolina Shipbuilding Company	Wilmington, North Carolina	United States	For War Shipping Administration.
24 May	Behar	Cargo ship	Barclay, Curle & Co. Ltd.	Glasgow	United Kingdom	For British India Steam Navigation Company.
24 May	Charles W. Eliot	Liberty ship	New England Shipbuilding Corporation	South Portland, Maine	United States	For War Shipping Administration.
24 May	Cyrus Hamlin	Liberty ship	Permanente Metals Corporation	Richmond, California	United States	For War Shipping Administration.
24 May	Harriet Beecher Stowe	Liberty ship	New England Shipbuilding Corporation	South Portland, Maine	United States	For War Shipping Administration.
24 May	James E. Haviland	Liberty ship	Todd Houston Shipbuilding Corporation	Houston, Texas	United States	For War Shipping Administration.
24 May	Joseph N. Nicollet	Liberty ship	Delta Shipbuilding	New Orleans, Louisiana	United States	For War Shipping Administration.
24 May	Thomas F. Bayard	Liberty ship	Bethlehem Fairfield Shipyard	Baltimore, Maryland	United States	For War Shipping Administration.
24 May	Zealand	C-type coaster	Ailsa Shipbuilding Co Ltd.	Troon	United Kingdom	For Currie Line Ltd.
25 May	Charles D. Poston	Liberty ship	California Shipbuilding Corporation	Los Angeles, California	United States	For War Shipping Administration.
25 May	George Davidson	Liberty ship	Oregon Shipbuilding Corporation	Portland, Oregon	United States	For War Shipping Administration.
25 May	Tecumseh	Liberty ship	Permanente Metals Corporation	Richmond, California	United States	For War Shipping Administration.
26 May	Empire Townsman	Severn type collier, coaster	Richard Dunston Ltd.	Thorne	United Kingdom	For the Ministry of War Transport.
26 May	John L. Sullivan	Liberty ship	Permanente Metals Corporation	Richmond, California	United States	For War Shipping Administration.
26 May	Mission Bay	Casablanca-class escort carrier	Kaiser Shipyards	Vancouver, Washington	United States	Converted S4 merchant hull
27 May	Cowra	Bathurst-class corvette	Poole & Steel Limited	Balmain, New South Wales	Australia	
27 May	Edward Burleson	Liberty ship	Todd Houston Shipbuilding Corporation	Houston, Texas	United States	For War Shipping Administration.
27 May	Joseph C. Avery	Liberty ship	Oregon Shipbuilding Corporation	Portland, Oregon	United States	For War Shipping Administration.
27 May	Josiah Earl	Liberty ship	California Shipbuilding Corporation	Los Angeles, California	United States	For War Shipping Administration.
28 May	Franklin K. Lane	Liberty ship	California Shipbuilding Corporation	Los Angeles, California	United States	For War Shipping Administration.
28 May	Henry Bergh	Liberty ship	Permanente Metals Corporation	Richmond, California	United States	For War Shipping Administration.
28 May	John Minto	Liberty ship	Oregon Shipbuilding Corporation	Portland, Oregon	United States	For War Shipping Administration.
28 May	Louisa M. Alcott	Liberty ship	Bethlehem Fairfield Shipyard	Baltimore, Maryland	United States	For War Shipping Administration.
28 May	TID 12	TID-class tug	Richard Dunston Ltd.	Thorne	United Kingdom	For the Ministry of War Transport.
29 May	Canyon Creek	T2 Tanker	Alabama Drydock and Shipbuilding Company	Mobile, Alabama	United States	For War Shipping Administration.
29 May	Empire Lewis	Maple-type tug	Richard Dunston Ltd.	Thorne	United Kingdom	For Ministry of War Transport.
29 May	Geronimo	Liberty ship	Permanente Metals Corporation	Richmond, California	United States	For War Shipping Administration.
29 May	John M. Morehead	Liberty ship	North Carolina Shipbuilding Company	Wilmington, North Carolina	United States	For War Shipping Administration.
29 May	Lorenzo De Zavala	Liberty ship	Todd Houston Shipbuilding Corporation	Houston, Texas	United States	For War Shipping Administration.
29 May	Robert Y. Hayne	Liberty ship	St. Johns River Shipbuilding Company	Jacksonville, Florida	United States	For War Shipping Administration.
29 May	Solar	Buckley-class destroyer escort	Philadelphia Naval Yard	Philadelphia	United States	
30 May	Irving M. Scott	Liberty ship	Permanente Metals Corporation	Richmond, California	United States	For War Shipping Administration.
30 May	James H. McClintock	Liberty ship	California Shipbuilding Corporation	Los Angeles, California	United States	For War Shipping Administration.
30 May	Joseph H. Nicholson	Liberty ship	Bethlehem Fairfield Shipyard	Baltimore, Maryland	United States	For War Shipping Administration.
30 May	Pleasant Armstrong	Liberty ship	Oregon Shipbuilding Corporation	Portland, Oregon	United States	For War Shipping Administration.
31 May	David E. Hughes	Liberty ship	California Shipbuilding Corporation	Los Angeles, California	United States	For War Shipping Administration.
31 May	Empire Outpost	Cargo ship	Harland & Wolff	Belfast	United Kingdom	For Ministry of War Transport.
31 May	Hannis Taylor	Liberty ship	North Carolina Shipbuilding Company	Wilmington, North Carolina	United States	For War Shipping Administration.
31 May	Jacob S. Mansfield	Liberty ship	California Shipbuilding Corporation	Los Angeles, California	United States	For War Shipping Administration.
31 May	John Carroll	Liberty ship	Permanente Metals Corporation	Richmond, California	United States	For War Shipping Administration.
31 May	John Hay	Liberty ship	J. A. Jones Construction Company	Panama City, Florida	United States	For War Shipping Administration.
31 May	Joseph S. Emery	Liberty ship	Permanente Metals Corporation	Richmond, California	United States	For War Shipping Administration.
31 May	Mascoma	T2 tanker	Marinship Corporation	Sausalito, California	United States	For United States Maritime Commission.
31 May	William Tyler Page	Liberty ship	Bethlehem Fairfield Shipyard	Baltimore, Maryland	United States	For War Shipping Administration.

== June ==
Date	Ship	Class	Builder	Location	Country	Notes
1 June	Frome	River-class minesweeper	Blyth Dry Docks & Shipbuilding Co. Ltd	Blyth, Northumberland	United Kingdom	For Royal Navy.
1 June	Thomas Nelson Page	Liberty ship	Bethlehem Fairfield Shipyard	Baltimore, Maryland	United States	For War Shipping Administration.
1 June	Wilson P. Hunt	Liberty ship	Oregon Shipbuilding Corporation	Portland, Oregon	United States	For War Shipping Administration.
2 June	Ability	Coaster	Goole Shipbuilding & Repairing Co. Ltd.	Goole	United Kingdom	For F. T. Everard & Sons Ltd.
2 June	Billy Mitchell	Liberty ship	California Shipbuilding Corporation	Los Angeles, California	United States	For War Shipping Administration.
2 June	Bürgermeister O'Swald II	lightvessel	Jos. L. Meyer	Papenburg	Germany	
2 June	Caxton	Cargo ship	J. L. Thompson & Sons Ltd.	Sunderland	United Kingdom	For Barberrys Steamship Co. Ltd.
2 June	Empire Mustang	Near-Warrior type tug	J. S. Watson Ltd.	Gainsborough	United Kingdom	For Ministry of War Transport.
2 June	Empire Flag	Refrigerated cargo ship	Sir W G Armstrong, Whitworth & Co (Shipbuilders) Ltd	Newcastle upon Tyne	United Kingdom	For Ministry of War Transport
2 June	George Berkeley	Liberty ship	Permanente Metals Corporation	Richmond, California	United States	For War Shipping Administration.
2 June	James McCosh	Liberty ship	Bethlehem Fairfield Shipyard	Baltimore, Maryland	United States	For War Shipping Administration.
2 June	John A. Quitman	Liberty ship	Delta Shipbuilding	New Orleans, Louisiana	United States	For War Shipping Administration.
2 June	Niantic	Bogue-class escort carrier	Seattle-Tacoma Shipyard	Tacoma, Washington	United States	Converted C3 merchant freighter for Lend-Lease as HMS Ranee
2 June	TID 14	TID-class tug	Richard Dunston Ltd.	Thorne	United Kingdom	For the Ministry of War Transport.
2 June	TID 31	TID-class tug	Richard Dunston Ltd.	Thorne	United Kingdom	For the War Department.
2 June	Wrenwood	C-type coaster	S. P. Austin & Sons Ltd.	Sunderland	United Kingdom	For Wm France, Fenwick & Co. Ltd.
3 June	Ben Holladay	Liberty ship	Oregon Shipbuilding Corporation	Portland, Oregon	United States	For War Shipping Administration.
3 June	Benjamin R. Milam	Liberty ship	Todd Houston Shipbuilding Corporation	Houston, Texas	United States	For War Shipping Administration.
3 June	Jonathan P. Dolliver	Liberty ship	Permanente Metals Corporation	Richmond, California	United States	For War Shipping Administration.
3 June	William Pepperell	Liberty ship	New England Shipbuilding Corporation	South Portland, Maine	United States	For War Shipping Administration.
4 June	Adolph Sutro	Liberty ship	Permanente Metals Corporation	Richmond, California	United States	For War Shipping Administration.
4 June	Edward Richardson	Liberty ship	North Carolina Shipbuilding Company	Wilmington, North Carolina	United States	For War Shipping Administration.
5 June	Guadalcanal	Casablanca-class escort carrier	Kaiser Shipyards	Vancouver, Washington	United States	Converted S4 merchant hull
5 June	Helmsdale	River-class frigate	Harland & Wolff	Govan	United Kingdom	For Royal Navy.
5 June	James Shields	Liberty ship	California Shipbuilding Corporation	Los Angeles, California	United States	For War Shipping Administration.
5 June	Joel Palmer	Liberty ship	Oregon Shipbuilding Corporation	Portland, Oregon	United States	For War Shipping Administration.
5 June	Richard M. Johnson	Liberty ship	Delta Shipbuilding	New Orleans, Louisiana	United States	For War Shipping Administration.
6 June	Albert C. Ritchie	Liberty ship	Bethlehem Fairfield Shipyard	Baltimore, Maryland	United States	For War Shipping Administration.
6 June	Edward Sparrow	Liberty ship	Delta Shipbuilding	New Orleans, Louisiana	United States	For War Shipping Administration.
6 June	Eugene B. Daskam	Liberty ship	California Shipbuilding Corporation	Los Angeles, California	United States	For War Shipping Administration.
6 June	John W. Mackay	Liberty ship	Permanente Metals Corporation	Richmond, California	United States	For War Shipping Administration.
7 June	Eugene Hale	Liberty ship	New England Shipbuilding Corporation	South Portland, Maine	United States	For War Shipping Administration.
7 June	James Harlan	Liberty ship	Permanente Metals Corporation	Richmond, California	United States	For War Shipping Administration.
7 June	Robert Treat	Liberty ship	New England Shipbuilding Corporation	South Portland, Maine	United States	For War Shipping Administration.
7 June	Thomas Nuttall	Liberty ship	Oregon Shipbuilding Corporation	Portland, Oregon	United States	For War Shipping Administration.
8 June	Andrew T. Huntington	Liberty ship	California Shipbuilding Corporation	Los Angeles, California	United States	For War Shipping Administration.
8 June	Empire Gulliver	Scandinavian type cargo ship	William Gray & Co. Ltd.	West Hartlepool	United Kingdom	For Ministry of War Transport.
8 June	James W. Nye	Liberty ship	Permanente Metals Corporation	Richmond, California	United States	For War Shipping Administration.
8 June	John A. Johnson	Liberty ship	Oregon Shipbuilding Corporation	Portland, Oregon	United States	For War Shipping Administration.
8 June	John Sharp Williams	Liberty ship	Delta Shipbuilding	New Orleans, Louisiana	United States	For War Shipping Administration.
8 June	Nicholas Herkimer	Liberty ship	Southeastern Shipbuilding Corporation	Savannah, Georgia	United States	For War Shipping Administration.
8 June	Sidney Sherman	Liberty ship	Todd Houston Shipbuilding Corporation	Houston, Texas	United States	For War Shipping Administration.
8 June	William T. Barry	Liberty ship	North Carolina Shipbuilding Company	Wilmington, North Carolina	United States	For War Shipping Administration.
9 June	George W. Woodward	Liberty ship	Bethlehem Fairfield Shipyard	Baltimore, Maryland	United States	For War Shipping Administration.
9 June	Ocklawaha	T2 tanker	Marinship Corporation	Sausalito, California	United States	For United States Maritime Commission.
9 June	Thomas B. Reed	Liberty ship	New England Shipbuilding Corporation	South Portland, Maine	United States	For War Shipping Administration.
10 June	Charles Bullfinch	Liberty ship	Bethlehem Fairfield Shipyard	Baltimore, Maryland	United States	For War Shipping Administration.
10 June	D. W. Harrington	Liberty ship	California Shipbuilding Corporation	Los Angeles, California	United States	For War Shipping Administration.
10 June	Ephraim W. Baughman	Liberty ship	Oregon Shipbuilding Corporation	Portland, Oregon	United States	For War Shipping Administration.
10 June	Robert Lucas	Liberty ship	Permanente Metals Corporation	Richmond, California	United States	For War Shipping Administration.
10 June	TID 15	TID-class tug	Richard Dunston Ltd.	Thorne	United Kingdom	For the Admiralty.
10 June	William W. Mayo	Liberty ship	Permanente Metals Corporation	Richmond, California	United States	For War Shipping Administration.
11 June	John Lind	Liberty ship	Permanente Metals Corporation	Richmond, California	United States	For War Shipping Administration.
11 June	Lee S. Overman	Liberty ship	North Carolina Shipbuilding Company	Wilmington, North Carolina	United States	For War Shipping Administration.
11 June	Pierre L'Enfant	Liberty ship	Bethlehem Fairfield Shipyard	Baltimore, Maryland	United States	For War Shipping Administration.
12 June	Edward Canby	Liberty ship	Oregon Shipbuilding Corporation	Portland, Oregon	United States	For War Shipping Administration.
12 June	Edward L. Grant	Liberty ship	Bethlehem Fairfield Shipyard	Baltimore, Maryland	United States	For War Shipping Administration.
12 June	William F. MacLennan	Liberty ship	California Shipbuilding Corporation	Los Angeles, California	United States	For War Shipping Administration.
13 June	Ole E. Rolvag	Liberty ship	Permanente Metals Corporation	Richmond, California	United States	For War Shipping Administration.
13 June	Robert J. Collier	Liberty ship	Bethlehem Fairfield Shipyard	Baltimore, Maryland	United States	For War Shipping Administration.
14 June	Joshua L. Chamberlin	Liberty ship	New England Shipbuilding Corporation	South Portland, Maine	United States	For War Shipping Administration.
14 June	Samuel A. Worcester	Liberty ship	Oregon Shipbuilding Corporation	Portland, Oregon	United States	For War Shipping Administration.
14 June	Thomas J. Jarvis	Liberty ship	North Carolina Shipbuilding Company	Wilmington, North Carolina	United States	For War Shipping Administration.
14 June	Wilfred Grenfell	Liberty ship	California Shipbuilding Corporation	Los Angeles, California	United States	For War Shipping Administration.
15 June	Cauvery	Modified Black Swan-class sloop			India	
15 June	Edwin T. Meredith	Liberty ship	Permanente Metals Corporation	Richmond, California	United States	For War Shipping Administration.
13 June	Florence Crittenton	Liberty ship	California Shipbuilding Corporation	Los Angeles, California	United States	For War Shipping Administration.
15 June	Gladio	Ariete-class torpedo boat	CRDA	Trieste	Italy	Built for Regia Marina but taken over by Germany as TA37
15 June	Henry Durant	Liberty ship	Marinship Corporation	Sausalito, California	United States	For United States Maritime Commission.
15 June	John A. Donald	Liberty ship	Bethlehem Fairfield Shipyard	Baltimore, Maryland	United States	For War Shipping Administration.
15 June	John F. Steffen	Liberty ship	Oregon Shipbuilding Corporation	Portland, Oregon	United States	For War Shipping Administration.
15 June	John Mary Odin	Liberty ship	Todd Houston Shipbuilding Corporation	Houston, Texas	United States	For War Shipping Administration.
15 June	John T. McMillan	Liberty ship	Permanente Metals Corporation	Richmond, California	United States	For War Shipping Administration.
15 June	Richard Montgomery	Liberty ship	St. Johns River Shipbuilding Company	Jacksonville, Florida	United States	For War Shipping Administration.
16 June	John McDonogh	Liberty ship	Delta Shipbuilding	New Orleans, Louisiana	United States	For War Shipping Administration.
17 June	Brighton	Cargo ship	Burntisland Shipbuilding Company	Burntisland	United Kingdom	For R. Chapman & Son.
17 June	Campania	Nairana-class escort carrier	Harland & Wolff	Belfast	United Kingdom	For Royal Navy.
17 June	Empire Gain	Intermediate type tanker	Sir J. Laing & Sons Ltd.	Sunderland	United Kingdom	For Ministry of War Transport.
17 June	Empire MacKay	MAC tanker	Harland & Wolff	Govan	United Kingdom	For Ministry of War Transport.
17 June	Fremont Older	Liberty ship	Permanente Metals Corporation	Richmond, California	United States	For War Shipping Administration.
17 June	Joseph Le Conte	Liberty ship	North Carolina Shipbuilding Company	Wilmington, North Carolina	United States	For War Shipping Administration.
17 June	Joseph Priestley	Liberty ship	California Shipbuilding Corporation	Los Angeles, California	United States	For War Shipping Administration.
17 June	Perdido	Bogue-class escort carrier	Seattle-Tacoma Shipyard	Tacoma, Washington	United States	Converted C3 merchant freighter for Lend-Lease as HMS Trouncer
17 June	Thomas Condon	Liberty ship	Oregon Shipbuilding Corporation	Portland, Oregon	United States	For War Shipping Administration.
17 June	TID 32	TID-class tug	Richard Dunston Ltd.	Thorne	United Kingdom	For the War Department.
18 June	Little Big Horn	T2 Tanker	Alabama Drydock and Shipbuilding Company	Mobile, Alabama	United States	For War Shipping Administration.
18 June	Samuel McIntyre	Liberty ship	Bethlehem Fairfield Shipyard	Baltimore, Maryland	United States	For War Shipping Administration.
18 June	Stephen T. Mather	Liberty ship	California Shipbuilding Corporation	Los Angeles, California	United States	For War Shipping Administration.
19 June	Conrad Kohrs	Liberty ship	Permanente Metals Corporation	Richmond, California	United States	For War Shipping Administration.
19 June	Empire Rival	Cargo ship	William Gray & Co. Ltd.	West Hartlepool	United Kingdom	For Ministry of War Transport.
19 June	Frank Springer	Liberty ship	California Shipbuilding Corporation	Los Angeles, California	United States	For War Shipping Administration.
19 June	Houston	Cleveland-class light cruiser	Newport News Shipbuilding & Dry Dock Company	Newport News, VA	United States	
19 June	Jeremiah O'Brien	Liberty ship	New England Shipbuilding Corporation	South Portland, Maine	United States	For War Shipping Administration.
19 June	Joshua W. Alexander	Liberty ship	Bethlehem Fairfield Shipyard	Baltimore, Maryland	United States	For War Shipping Administration.
19 June	Mary Austin	Liberty ship	Todd Houston Shipbuilding Corporation	Houston, Texas	United States	For War Shipping Administration.
19 June	Simon Benson	Liberty ship	Oregon Shipbuilding Corporation	Portland, Oregon	United States	For War Shipping Administration.
19 June	TID 16	TID-class tug	Richard Dunston Ltd.	Thorne	United Kingdom	For the Admiralty Ministry of War Transport.
19 June	Vestal	Algerine-class minesweeper	Harland & Wolff	Belfast	United Kingdom	For Royal Navy.
20 June	Arthur Dobbs	Liberty ship	North Carolina Shipbuilding Company	Wilmington, North Carolina	United States	For War Shipping Administration.
20 June	Empire Percy	Maple-type tug	Richard Dunston Ltd.	Thorne	United Kingdom	For Ministry of War Transport.
20 June	Maria Stanford	Liberty ship	Permanente Metals Corporation	Richmond, California	United States	For War Shipping Administration.
20 June	Stephen Crane	Liberty ship	Permanente Metals Corporation	Richmond, California	United States	For War Shipping Administration.
21 June	Empire Macrae	MAC ship	Lithgows Ltd.	Port Glasgow	United Kingdom	For Ministry of War Transport.
21 June	Finley Peter Dunne	Liberty ship	California Shipbuilding Corporation	Los Angeles, California	United States	For War Shipping Administration.
21 June	Irving W. Platt	Liberty ship	Oregon Shipbuilding Corporation	Portland, Oregon	United States	For War Shipping Administration.
21 June	Robert Trimble	Liberty ship	J. A. Jones Construction Co.	Brunswick, Georgia	United States	For War Shipping Administration.
22 June	Empire Islander	Icemaid type collier	Grangemouth Dockyard Co. Ltd.	Grangemouth	United Kingdom	For Ministry of War Transport.
23 June	George Cleeve	Liberty ship	New England Shipbuilding Corporation	South Portland, Maine	United States	For War Shipping Administration.
23 June	Jacob H. Gallinger	Liberty ship	New England Shipbuilding Corporation	South Portland, Maine	United States	For War Shipping Administration.
23 June	John A. Poor	Liberty ship	New England Shipbuilding Corporation	South Portland, Maine	United States	For War Shipping Administration.
23 June	Nicholas J. Sinnott	Liberty ship	Oregon Shipbuilding Corporation	Portland, Oregon	United States	For War Shipping Administration.
23 June	Quincy	Baltimore-class heavy cruiser	Bethlehem Steel Company	Quincy, MA	United States	
23 June	Sylvester Gardiner	Liberty ship	New England Shipbuilding Corporation	South Portland, Maine	United States	For War Shipping Administration.
23 June	TID 33	TID-class tug	Richard Dunston Ltd.	Thorne	United Kingdom	For Ministry of War Transport.
23 June	William Beaumont	Liberty ship	Permanente Metals Corporation	Richmond, California	United States	For War Shipping Administration.
23 June	William H. Jackson	Liberty ship	Bethlehem Fairfield Shipyard	Baltimore, Maryland	United States	For War Shipping Administration.
24 June	Christopher C. Andrews	Liberty ship	Permanente Metals Corporation	Richmond, California	United States	For War Shipping Administration.
24 June	E. A. Peden	Liberty ship	Todd Houston Shipbuilding Corporation	Houston, Texas	United States	For War Shipping Administration.
24 June	Henry L. Pittock	Liberty ship	Oregon Shipbuilding Corporation	Portland, Oregon	United States	For War Shipping Administration.
24 June	John H. Rosseter	Liberty ship	Permanente Metals Corporation	Richmond, California	United States	For War Shipping Administration.
24 June	John Lawson	Liberty ship	North Carolina Shipbuilding Company	Wilmington, North Carolina	United States	For War Shipping Administration.
24 June	Marina Raskova	Liberty ship	California Shipbuilding Corporation	Los Angeles, California	United States	For War Shipping Administration.
25 June	Casimir Pulaski	Liberty ship	Southeastern Shipbuilding Corporation	Savannah, Georgia	United States	For War Shipping Administration.
25 June	Charles A. Warfield	Liberty ship	California Shipbuilding Corporation	Los Angeles, California	United States	For War Shipping Administration.
25 June	Henry Dodge	Liberty ship	Permanente Metals Corporation	Richmond, California	United States	For War Shipping Administration.
25 June	Pamanset	T2 tanker	Marinship Corporation	Sausalito, California	United States	For United States Maritime Commission.
26 June	Felix Hathaway	Liberty ship	Oregon Shipbuilding Corporation	Portland, Oregon	United States	For War Shipping Administration.
26 June	Janet Lord Ropner	Liberty ship	Bethlehem Fairfield Shipyard	Baltimore, Maryland	United States	For War Shipping Administration.
26 June	TID 17	TID-class tug	Richard Dunston Ltd.	Thorne	United Kingdom	For the Admiralty Ministry of War Transport.
27 June	Hilary A. Herbert	Liberty ship	North Carolina Shipbuilding Company	Wilmington, North Carolina	United States	For War Shipping Administration.
27 June	John S. Sargent	Liberty ship	Permanente Metals Corporation	Richmond, California	United States	For War Shipping Administration.
28 June	Charles Robinson	Liberty ship	Permanente Metals Corporation	Richmond, California	United States	For War Shipping Administration.
28 June	Dwight D. Moody	Liberty ship	J. A. Jones Construction Company	Panama City, Florida	United States	For War Shipping Administration.
28 June	Floyd B. Olson	Liberty ship	Permanente Metals Corporation	Richmond, California	United States	For War Shipping Administration.
28 June	James Withycombe	Liberty ship	Oregon Shipbuilding Corporation	Portland, Oregon	United States	For War Shipping Administration.
28 June	Nathan Towson	Liberty ship	Bethlehem Fairfield Shipyard	Baltimore, Maryland	United States	For War Shipping Administration.
28 June	Stephen Vincent Benet	Liberty ship	California Shipbuilding Corporation	Los Angeles, California	United States	For War Shipping Administration.
29 June	Empire Daring	Cargo ship	William Hamilton & Co. Ltd.	Port Glasgow	United Kingdom	For Ministry of War Transport
29 June	Empire Traveller	Ocean typetanker	Harland & Wolff	Belfast	United Kingdom	For Ministry of War Transport.
29 June	Increase A. Lapham	Liberty ship	Permanente Metals Corporation	Richmond, California	United States	For War Shipping Administration.
29 June	Robert Erskine	Liberty ship	Bethlehem Fairfield Shipyard	Baltimore, Maryland	United States	For War Shipping Administration.
29 June	Stephen H. Long	Liberty ship	California Shipbuilding Corporation	Los Angeles, California	United States	For War Shipping Administration.
30 June	Anson P. K. Safford	Liberty ship	California Shipbuilding Corporation	Los Angeles, California	United States	For War Shipping Administration.
30 June	Binger Hermann	Liberty ship	Oregon Shipbuilding Corporation	Portland, Oregon	United States	For War Shipping Administration.
30 June	Clan Urquhart	Cargo ship	Greenock Dockyard Co. Ltd.	Greenock	United Kingdom	For the Clan Line Steamers Ltd.
30 June	Hutchison I. Cone	Liberty ship	North Carolina Shipbuilding Company	Wilmington, North Carolina	United States	For War Shipping Administration.
30 June	John Stevenson	Liberty ship	Bethlehem Fairfield Shipyard	Baltimore, Maryland	United States	For War Shipping Administration.
30 June	Leonidas Merritt	Liberty ship	Permanente Metals Corporation	Richmond, California	United States	For War Shipping Administration.
30 June	Mahadevi	Cargo ship	Lithgows Ltd.	Port Glasgow	United Kingdom	For Asiatic Steam Navigation Co. Ltd.
30 June	Manchester Shipper	Cargo ship	Blythswood Shipbuilding Co. Ltd.	Glasgow	United Kingdom	For Manchester Liners Ltd.
30 June	Sam Houston II	Liberty ship	Todd Houston Shipbuilding Corporation	Houston, Texas	United States	For War Shipping Administration.
30 June	Vent	Diver-class rescue and salvage ship	Basalt Rock Company	Napa, California	United States	
30 June	William R. Nelson	Liberty ship	California Shipbuilding Corporation	Los Angeles, California	United States	For War Shipping Administration.

== July ==
Date	Ship	Class	Builder	Location	Country	Notes
1 July	Clarence King	Liberty ship	Permanente Metals Corporation	Richmond, California	United States	For War Shipping Administration.
1 July	Donald MacLeay	Liberty ship	Oregon Shipbuilding Corporation	Portland, Oregon	United States	For War Shipping Administration.
1 July	Greenwich	Cargo ship	William Doxford & Sons Ltd.	Pallion	United Kingdom	For Britain Steamship Co. Ltd.
1 July	VIC 17	VIC lighter	Isaac Pimblott & Sons Ltd.	Northwich	United Kingdom	For the War Department.
2 July	Empire MacMahon	MAC tanker	Swan, Hunter & Wigham Richardson Ltd.	Wallsend	United Kingdom	For Ministry of War Transport.
2 July	McLellan Creek	T2 Tanker	Alabama Drydock and Shipbuilding Company	Mobile, Alabama	United States	For War Shipping Administration.
2 July	TID 34	TID-class tug	Richard Dunston Ltd.	Thorne	United Kingdom	For Ministry of War Transport.
3 July	Henry L. Hoyt	Liberty ship	Oregon Shipbuilding Corporation	Portland, Oregon	United States	For War Shipping Administration.
3 July	Jacob Riis	Liberty ship	California Shipbuilding Corporation	Los Angeles, California	United States	Completed as Samholt for Ministry of War Transport.
3 July	Kiama	Bathurst-class corvette	Evans Deakin & Co	Brisbane	Australia	
3 July	Lawrence D. Tyson	Liberty ship	North Carolina Shipbuilding Company	Wilmington, North Carolina	United States	For War Shipping Administration.
3 July	VIC 32	VIC lighter	Richard Dunston Ltd.	Thorne	United Kingdom	For the Admiralty.
4 July	George M. Cohan	Liberty ship	Bethlehem Fairfield Shipyard	Baltimore, Maryland	United States	For War Shipping Administration.
4 July	John Philip Sousa	Liberty ship	St. Johns River Shipbuilding Company	Jacksonville, Florida	United States	For War Shipping Administration.
4 July	Joseph Watt	Liberty ship	Oregon Shipbuilding Corporation	Portland, Oregon	United States	For War Shipping Administration.
4 July	Peter Zenger	Liberty ship	J. A. Jones Construction Company	Panama City, Florida	United States	For War Shipping Administration.
4 July	William Prouse	Liberty ship	Permanente Metals Corporation	Richmond, California	United States	For War Shipping Administration.
5 July	Empire Dolly	Modified Warrior-type tug	John Crown & Sons Ltd	Sunderland	United Kingdom	For Ministry of War Transport.
5 July	Empire Path	Cargo ship	John Readhead & Sons Ltd.	South Shields	United Kingdom	For Ministry of War Transport.
5 July	George C. Childress	Liberty ship	Todd Houston Shipbuilding Corporation	Houston, Texas	United States	For War Shipping Administration.
6 July	Francis G. Newlands	Liberty ship	Permanente Metals Corporation	Richmond, California	United States	For War Shipping Administration.
6 July	Hamlin Garland	Liberty ship	Southeastern Shipbuilding Corporation	Savannah, Georgia	United States	For War Shipping Administration.
6 July	J. Pinckney Henderson	Liberty ship	Todd Houston Shipbuilding Corporation	Houston, Texas	United States	For War Shipping Administration.
6 July	M. H. De Young	Liberty ship	Permanente Metals Corporation	Richmond, California	United States	For War Shipping Administration.
7 July	Delazon Smith	Liberty ship	Oregon Shipbuilding Corporation	Portland, Oregon	United States	For War Shipping Administration.
7 July	Hart	Modified Black Swan-class sloop			United Kingdom	
7 July	John Stagg	Liberty ship	Delta Shipbuilding	New Orleans, Louisiana	United States	For War Shipping Administration.
7 July	TID 35	TID-class tug	Richard Dunston Ltd.	Thorne	United Kingdom	For Ministry of War Transport.
8 July	David F. Houston	Liberty ship	North Carolina Shipbuilding Company	Wilmington, North Carolina	United States	For War Shipping Administration.
8 July	John E. Wilkie	Liberty ship	Permanente Metals Corporation	Richmond, California	United States	For War Shipping Administration.
8 July	John J. Ingalls	Liberty ship	California Shipbuilding Corporation	Los Angeles, California	United States	Completed as Samson for Ministry of War Transport.
9 July	Ambrose Bierce	Liberty ship	Permanente Metals Corporation	Richmond, California	United States	For War Shipping Administration.
9 July	Samuel K. Barlow	Liberty ship	Oregon Shipbuilding Corporation	Portland, Oregon	United States	For War Shipping Administration.
10 July	Andrew Pickens	Liberty ship	Southeastern Shipbuilding Corporation	Savannah, Georgia	United States	For War Shipping Administration.
10 July	Billy Sunday	Liberty ship	California Shipbuilding Corporation	Los Angeles, California	United States	For War Shipping Administration.
10 July	George H. Pendleton	Liberty ship	Bethlehem Fairfield Shipyard	Baltimore, Maryland	United States	For War Shipping Administration.
10 July	George W. Kendall	Liberty ship	Delta Shipbuilding	New Orleans, Louisiana	United States	For War Shipping Administration.
10 July	John Ross	Liberty ship	Permanente Metals Corporation	Richmond, California	United States	For War Shipping Administration.
10 July	Manila Bay	Casablanca-class escort carrier	Kaiser Shipyards	Vancouver, Washington	United States	Converted S4 merchant hull
10 July	Ponganset	T2 tanker	Marinship Corporation	Sausalito, California	United States	For United States Maritime Commission.
10 July	Tiefland	Hansa A Type cargo ship	Lübecker Flenderwerke AG	Lübeck	Germany	For Hamburg Südamerikanische Dampfschifffahrts-Gesellschaft A/S & Co K
11 July	Granville Stuart	Liberty ship	California Shipbuilding Corporation	Los Angeles, California	United States	Completed as Samaritan for Ministry of War Transport.
11 July	John Catron	Liberty ship	J. A. Jones Construction Co.	Brunswick, Georgia	United States	For War Shipping Administration.
11 July	John Merrick	Liberty ship	North Carolina Shipbuilding Company	Wilmington, North Carolina	United States	For War Shipping Administration.
11 July	John P. Gaines	Liberty ship	Oregon Shipbuilding Corporation	Portland, Oregon	United States	For War Shipping Administration.
11 July	John Wanamaker	Liberty ship	Bethlehem Fairfield Shipyard	Baltimore, Maryland	United States	For War Shipping Administration.
11 July	Joseph A. Holmes	Liberty ship	Permanente Metals Corporation	Richmond, California	United States	For War Shipping Administration.
12 July	George P. Garrison	Liberty ship	Todd Houston Shipbuilding Corporation	Houston, Texas	United States	For War Shipping Administration.
12 July	James A. Farrell	Liberty ship	Bethlehem Fairfield Shipyard	Baltimore, Maryland	United States	For War Shipping Administration.
12 July	Strahan	Bathurst-class corvette	State Dockyard	Newcastle, New South Wales	Australia	
12 July	Cape Berkeley	Type C1-S-AY1 Landing Ship, Infantry	Consolidated Steel Corporation	Wilmington, California	United States	To Ministry of War Transport on completion under Lend-Lease
12 July	Zona Gale	Liberty ship	California Shipbuilding Corporation	Los Angeles, California	United States	For War Shipping Administration.
13 July	Brand Whitlock	Liberty ship	California Shipbuilding Corporation	Los Angeles, California	United States	For War Shipping Administration.
13 July	James Fergus	Liberty ship	Permanente Metals Corporation	Richmond, California	United States	For War Shipping Administration.
13 July	William C. Lane	Liberty ship	Oregon Shipbuilding Corporation	Portland, Oregon	United States	Completed as Sampler for Ministry of War Transport.
14 July	Cuxhaven	Hansa A Type cargo ship	Deutsche Werft	Hamburg	Germany	For Hamburg-Amerikanische Packetfahrt-Aktien-Gesellschaft
14 July	David Douglas	Liberty ship	Oregon Shipbuilding Corporation	Portland, Oregon	United States	For War Shipping Administration.
14 July	Luther S. Kelly	Liberty ship	Permanente Metals Corporation	Richmond, California	United States	For War Shipping Administration.
14 July	Tobias E. Stansbury	Liberty ship	Delta Shipbuilding	New Orleans, Louisiana	United States	For War Shipping Administration.
15 July	Cedar Mills	T2 Tanker	Alabama Drydock and Shipbuilding Company	Mobile, Alabama	United States	For War Shipping Administration.
15 July	Charles A. Dana	Liberty ship	North Carolina Shipbuilding Company	Wilmington, North Carolina	United States	For War Shipping Administration.
15 July	Charles N. McGroarty	Liberty ship	Permanente Metals Corporation	Richmond, California	United States	For War Shipping Administration.
15 July	Crosby S. Noyes	Liberty ship	Bethlehem Fairfield Shipyard	Baltimore, Maryland	United States	For War Shipping Administration.
15 July	Edenwood	Cargo ship	Hall, Russell & Co. Ltd.	Aberdeen	United Kingdom	For Joseph Constantine Steamship Line Ltd.
15 July	Empire City	Cargo ship	William Doxford & Sons	Sunderland	United Kingdom	For Ministry of War Transport
15 July	Oran M. Roberts	Liberty ship	Todd Houston Shipbuilding Corporation	Houston, Texas	United States	For War Shipping Administration.
15 July	Sunset	Bogue-class escort carrier	Seattle-Tacoma Shipyard	Tacoma, Washington	United States	Converted C3 merchant freighter for Lend-Lease as HMS Thane
15 July	TID 36	TID-class tug	Richard Dunston Ltd.	Thorne	United Kingdom	For Ministry of War Transport.
15 July	Vernon L. Kellog	Liberty ship	California Shipbuilding Corporation	Los Angeles, California	United States	For War Shipping Administration.
16 July	Empire Copperfield	Cargo ship	William Pickersgill & Sons Ltdd	Sunderland	United Kingdom	For Ministry of War Transport
16 July	George H. Himes	Liberty ship	Oregon Shipbuilding Corporation	Portland, Oregon	United States	For War Shipping Administration.
16 July	George W. Childs	Liberty ship	Bethlehem Fairfield Shipyard	Baltimore, Maryland	United States	For War Shipping Administration.
16 July	Jack London	Liberty ship	Marinship Corporation	Sausalito, California	United States	For United States Maritime Commission.
16 July	Jose Marti	Liberty ship	Bethlehem Fairfield Shipyard	Baltimore, Maryland	United States	For War Shipping Administration.
16 July	Lapwing	Black Swan-class sloop			United Kingdom	
16 July	Thamesfield	Tanker	Sir James Laing & Sons Ltd.	Sunderland	United Kingdom	For Northern Petroleum Tank Steamship Co. Ltd.
17 July	Empire Regent	Standard Fast type cargo liner	Furness Shipbuilding Co. Ltd.	Haverton Hill-on-Tees	United Kingdom	For Ministry of War Transport.
17 July	Empire Seaman	Scandinavian type cargo ship	William Gray & Co. Ltd.	West Hartlepool	United Kingdom	For Ministry of War Transport.
17 July	Empire Tourist	Cargo ship	Bartram & Sons Ltd	Sunderland	United Kingdom	For Ministry of War Transport.
17 July	Howard T. Ricketts	Liberty ship	California Shipbuilding Corporation	Los Angeles, California	United States	For War Shipping Administration.
17 July	Richard P. Hobson	Liberty ship	North Carolina Shipbuilding Company	Wilmington, North Carolina	United States	For War Shipping Administration.
17 July	Robert Lansing	Liberty ship	J. A. Jones Construction Company	Panama City, Florida	United States	For War Shipping Administration.
17 July	Robert T. Hill	Liberty ship	Todd Houston Shipbuilding Corporation	Houston, Texas	United States	For War Shipping Administration.
17 July	Thomas M. Cooley	Liberty ship	Permanente Metals Corporation	Richmond, California	United States	For War Shipping Administration.
17 July	VIC 27	VIC lighter	Isaac Pimblott & Sons Ltd.	Northwich	United Kingdom	For the Admiralty.
17 July	Vincennes	Cleveland-class light cruiser	Fore River Shipyard	Quincy, MA	United States	
17 July	William N. Byers	Liberty ship	Permanente Metals Corporation	Richmond, California	United States	For War Shipping Administration.
18 July	J. D. Ross	Liberty ship	Oregon Shipbuilding Corporation	Portland, Oregon	United States	For War Shipping Administration.
18 July	John Evans	Liberty ship	Permanente Metals Corporation	Richmond, California	United States	For War Shipping Administration.
18 July	Robert Eden	Liberty ship	Bethlehem Fairfield Shipyard	Baltimore, Maryland	United States	For War Shipping Administration.
18 July	Robert G. Ingersoll	Liberty ship	California Shipbuilding Corporation	Los Angeles, California	United States	For War Shipping Administration.
18 July	Robert Jordan	Liberty ship	New England Shipbuilding Corporation	South Portland, Maine	United States	For War Shipping Administration.
18 July	Robert Rogers	Liberty ship	New England Shipbuilding Corporation	South Portland, Maine	United States	For War Shipping Administration.
19 July	Ina Coolbrith	Liberty ship	California Shipbuilding Corporation	Los Angeles, California	United States	For War Shipping Administration.
19 July	TID 20	TID-class tug	Richard Dunston Ltd	Thorne	United Kingdom	For Ministry of War Transport.
20 July	Empire Duke	Cargo ship	J. L. Thompson & Sons Ltd.	Sunderland, Co Durham	United Kingdom	For Ministry of War Transport
20 July	Empire Nigel	Cargo ship	William Gray & Co. Ltd.	West Hartlepool	United Kingdom	For Ministry of War Transport.
20 July	James K. Kelly	Liberty ship	Oregon Shipbuilding Corporation	Portland, Oregon	United States	For War Shipping Administration.
20 July	Johnathan Holt	Cargo ship	Cammell Laird & Co. Ltd.	Birkenhead	United Kingdom	For John Holt & Co (Liverpool) Ltd.
20 July	Joshua Hendy	Liberty ship	Permanente Metals Corporation	Richmond, California	United States	For War Shipping Administration.
20 July	MMS 282	MMS-class minesweeper	J. Bolson & Son Ltd.	Poole	United Kingdom	For Royal Navy.
20 July	Natoma Bay	Casablanca-class escort carrier	Kaiser Shipyards	Vancouver, Washington	United States	Converted S4 merchant hull
20 July	Nelson Dingley	Liberty ship	New England Shipbuilding Corporation	South Portland, Maine	United States	For War Shipping Administration.
20 July	TID 18	TID-class tug	Richard Dunston Ltd.	Thorne	United Kingdom	For the War Department.
21 July	Clement Clay	Liberty ship	North Carolina Shipbuilding Company	Wilmington, North Carolina	United States	For War Shipping Administration.
21 July	Empire MacColl	MAC tanker	Cammel Laird & Co Ltd.	Birkenhead	United Kingdom	For Ministry of War Transport.
21 July	Frank D. Phinney	Liberty ship	Permanente Metals Corporation	Richmond, California	United States	For War Shipping Administration.
21 July	Henry Watterson	Liberty ship	St. Johns River Shipbuilding Company	Jacksonville, Florida	United States	For War Shipping Administration.
22 July	Cornelius Cole	Liberty ship	California Shipbuilding Corporation	Los Angeles, California	United States	Completed as Samsurf for Ministry of War Transport.
22 July	George Vickers	Liberty ship	Bethlehem Fairfield Shipyard	Baltimore, Maryland	United States	For War Shipping Administration.
22 July	Thomas W. Symons	Liberty ship	Oregon Shipbuilding Corporation	Portland, Oregon	United States	For War Shipping Administration.
22 July	William H. Allen	Liberty ship	Permanente Metals Corporation	Richmond, California	United States	For War Shipping Administration.
23 July	Arthur P. Davis	Liberty ship	California Shipbuilding Corporation	Los Angeles, California	United States	For War Shipping Administration.
23 July	Harry A. Garfield	Liberty ship	New England Shipbuilding Corporation	South Portland, Maine	United States	For War Shipping Administration.
23 July	Louis Marshall	Liberty ship	Bethlehem Fairfield Shipyard	Baltimore, Maryland	United States	For War Shipping Administration.
23 July	Willis C. Hawley	Liberty ship	Oregon Shipbuilding Corporation	Portland, Oregon	United States	For War Shipping Administration.
24 July	Augustus H. Garland	Liberty ship	California Shipbuilding Corporation	Los Angeles, California	United States	Completed as Samblade for Ministry of War Transport.
24 July	Marcus Daly	Liberty ship	Permanente Metals Corporation	Richmond, California	United States	For War Shipping Administration.
24 July	Melville E. Stone	Liberty ship	Permanente Metals Corporation	Richmond, California	United States	For War Shipping Administration.
24 July	Thomas W. Owen	Liberty ship	North Carolina Shipbuilding Company	Wilmington, North Carolina	United States	For War Shipping Administration.
24 July	TID 21	TID-class tug	Richard Dunston Ltd.	Thorne	United Kingdom	For Ministry of War Transport.
24 July	Townsend Harris	Liberty ship	Bethlehem Fairfield Shipyard	Baltimore, Maryland	United States	For War Shipping Administration.
25 July	Mary Ashley Townsend	Liberty ship	Delta Shipbuilding	New Orleans, Louisiana	United States	For War Shipping Administration.
25 July	Thomas U. Walter	Liberty ship	Bethlehem Fairfield Shipyard	Baltimore, Maryland	United States	For War Shipping Administration.
25 July	William L. Yancey	Liberty ship	Southeastern Shipbuilding Corporation	Savannah, Georgia	United States	For War Shipping Administration.
25 July	Wyatt Earp	Liberty ship	California Shipbuilding Corporation	Los Angeles, California	United States	For War Shipping Administration.
26 July	Frederick H. Newell	Liberty ship	Todd Houston Shipbuilding Corporation	Houston, Texas	United States	For War Shipping Administration.
26 July	George L. Curry	Liberty ship	Oregon Shipbuilding Corporation	Portland, Oregon	United States	For War Shipping Administration.
26 July	Henry V. Aldorado	Liberty ship	Permanente Metals Corporation	Richmond, California	United States	For War Shipping Administration.
27 July	Chatham C. Lyon	Liberty ship	North Carolina Shipbuilding Company	Wilmington, North Carolina	United States	For War Shipping Administration.
27 July	William Hume	Liberty ship	Oregon Shipbuilding Corporation	Portland, Oregon	United States	For War Shipping Administration.
28 July	Ezra Weston	Liberty ship	New England Shipbuilding Corporation	South Portland, Maine	United States	For War Shipping Administration.
28 July	George Innes	Liberty ship	Permanente Metals Corporation	Richmond, California	United States	For War Shipping Administration.
28 July	John Constantine	Liberty ship	Permanente Metals Corporation	Richmond, California	United States	For War Shipping Administration.
28 July	John W. Powell	Liberty ship	Bethlehem Fairfield Shipyard	Baltimore, Maryland	United States	For War Shipping Administration.
28 July	Josiah Quincy	Liberty ship	New England Shipbuilding Corporation	South Portland, Maine	United States	For War Shipping Administration.
28 July	Thorstein Veblen	Liberty ship	Bethlehem Fairfield Shipyard	Baltimore, Maryland	United States	For War Shipping Administration.
29 July	Anton M. Holter	Liberty ship	Oregon Shipbuilding Corporation	Portland, Oregon	United States	Completed as Sambay for Ministry of War Transport.
29 July	Edwin Joseph O'Hara	Liberty ship	California Shipbuilding Corporation	Los Angeles, California	United States	Completed as Sambo for Ministry of War Transport.
29 July	John T. Holt	Liberty ship	Bethlehem Fairfield Shipyard	Baltimore, Maryland	United States	For War Shipping Administration.
29 July	Ontario	Minotaur-class cruiser	Harland & Wolff	Belfast	United Kingdom	For Royal Navy.
	Sebec	T2 tanker	Marinship Corporation	Sausalito, California	United States	For United States Maritime Commission.
30 July	Empire Symbol	Cargo ship	Charles Connell & Co Ltd	Glasgow	United Kingdom	For Ministry of War Transport.
30 July	H. G. Blasdel	Liberty ship	Permanente Metals Corporation	Richmond, California	United States	For War Shipping Administration.
31 July	Clinton Kelly	Liberty ship	Oregon Shipbuilding Corporation	Portland, Oregon	United States	For War Shipping Administration.
31 July	Edwin L. Drake	Liberty ship	Bethlehem Fairfield Shipyard	Baltimore, Maryland	United States	For War Shipping Administration.
31 July	Empire Duke	Cargo ship	J L Thompson & Sons Ltd	Sunderland, Co Durham	United Kingdom	For Ministry of War Transport
31 July	Grasp	Diver-class rescue and salvage ship	Basalt Rock Company	Napa, California	United States	
31 July	Hat Creek	T2 Tanker	Alabama Drydock and Shipbuilding Company	Mobile, Alabama	United States	For War Shipping Administration.
31 July	James H. Robinson	Liberty ship	California Shipbuilding Corporation	Los Angeles, California	United States	Completed as Samsteel for Ministry of War Transport.
31 July	James I. McKay	Liberty ship	North Carolina Shipbuilding Company	Wilmington, North Carolina	United States	For War Shipping Administration.
31 July	John McKinley	Liberty ship	J. A. Jones Construction Co.	Brunswick, Georgia	United States	For War Shipping Administration.
31 July	Lafacadio Hearn	Liberty ship	Delta Shipbuilding	New Orleans, Louisiana	United States	For War Shipping Administration.
31 July	Thomas C. Power	Liberty ship	Permanente Metals Corporation	Richmond, California	United States	For War Shipping Administration.
31 July	TID 19	TID-class tug	Richard Dunston Ltd.	Thorne	United Kingdom	For the War Department.
31 July	William F. Vilas	Liberty ship	Permanente Metals Corporation	Richmond, California	United States	For War Shipping Administration.

== August ==
Date	Ship	Class	Builder	Location	Country	Notes
1 August	Bataan	Independence-class light aircraft carrier	New York Shipbuilding Corporation	Camden, NJ	United States	Converted cruiser hull
1 August	Edward D. Baker	Liberty ship	Oregon Shipbuilding Corporation	Portland, Oregon	United States	For War Shipping Administration
1 August	James Bowdoin	Liberty ship	New England Shipbuilding Corporation	South Portland, Maine	United States	For War Shipping Administration
2 August	Riverton	Cargo ship	Burntisland Shipbuilding Company	Burntisland	United Kingdom	For R. Chapman & Son.
2 August	St. Andrews	Bogue-class escort carrier	Seattle-Tacoma Shipyard	Tacoma, Washington	United States	Converted C3 merchant freighter for Lend-Lease as HMS Queen
2 August	Empire Harlequin	Near-Warrior type tug	A. Hall & Co. Ltd	Aberdeen	United Kingdom	For Ministry of War Transport
2 August	William Matson	Liberty ship	Permanente Metals Corporation	Richmond, California	United States	For War Shipping Administration
3 August	Arunah S. Abell	Liberty ship	Bethlehem Fairfield Shipyard	Baltimore, Maryland	United States	For War Shipping Administration
3 August	Pickle	Algerine-class minesweeper	Harland & Wolff	Belfast	United Kingdom	For Royal Navy
3 August	Samuel Lancaster	Liberty ship	Oregon Shipbuilding Corporation	Portland, Oregon	United States	For War Shipping Administration
4 August	Brander Matthews	Liberty ship	Permanente Metals Corporation	Richmond, California	United States	For War Shipping Administration
4 August	John N. Maffitt	Liberty ship	North Carolina Shipbuilding Company	Wilmington, North Carolina	United States	For War Shipping Administration
4 August	Meon	River-class frigate	Harland & Wolff	Belfast	United Kingdom	For Royal Navy
4 August	Myron T. Herrick	Liberty ship	Permanente Metals Corporation	Richmond, California	United States	For War Shipping Administration
4 August	TID 22	TID-class tug	Richard Dunston Ltd	Thorne	United Kingdom	For Ministry of War Transport
4 August	TID 37	TID-class tug	Richard Dunston Ltd	Thorne	United Kingdom	For the Admiralty Ministry of War Transport
4 August	William I. Kip	Liberty ship	California Shipbuilding Corporation	Los Angeles, California	United States	Completed as Sampan for Ministry of War Transport
5 August	Edwin Abbey	Liberty ship	California Shipbuilding Corporation	Los Angeles, California	United States	For War Shipping Administration
5 August	George Dewey	Liberty ship	St. Johns River Shipbuilding Company	Jacksonville, Florida	United States	For War Shipping Administration
5 August	Jacob Thompson	Liberty ship	Delta Shipbuilding	New Orleans, Louisiana	United States	For War Shipping Administration
5 August	John Jacob Astor	Liberty ship	Oregon Shipbuilding Corporation	Portland, Oregon	United States	For War Shipping Administration
5 August	Joshua Thomas	Liberty ship	Bethlehem Fairfield Shipyard	Baltimore, Maryland	United States	For War Shipping Administration
6 August	George Whitefield	Liberty ship	Southeastern Shipbuilding Corporation	Savannah, Georgia	United States	For War Shipping Administration
6 August	John H. Reagan	Liberty ship	Todd Houston Shipbuilding Corporation	Houston, Texas	United States	For War Shipping Administration
6 August	William Keith	Liberty ship	Permanente Metals Corporation	Richmond, California	United States	For War Shipping Administration
7 August	Andrew Marschalk	Liberty ship	Delta Shipbuilding	New Orleans, Louisiana	United States	For War Shipping Administration
7 August	Charles M. Russell	Liberty ship	Oregon Shipbuilding Corporation	Portland, Oregon	United States	For War Shipping Administration
7 August	George Durant	Liberty ship	North Carolina Shipbuilding Company	Wilmington, North Carolina	United States	For War Shipping Administration
7 August	Ring Lardner	Liberty ship	Permanente Metals Corporation	Richmond, California	United States	For War Shipping Administration
8 August	Arthur L. Perry	Liberty ship	New England Shipbuilding Corporation	South Portland, Maine	United States	For War Shipping Administration
8 August	Henry M. Robinson	Liberty ship	California Shipbuilding Corporation	Los Angeles, California	United States	Completed as Samarovsk for Ministry of War Transport
8 August	Joseph K. Toole	Liberty ship	Permanente Metals Corporation	Richmond, California	United States	For War Shipping Administration
8 August	Joseph Simon	Liberty ship	Oregon Shipbuilding Corporation	Portland, Oregon	United States	For War Shipping Administration
9 August	David De Vries	Liberty ship	Bethlehem Fairfield Shipyard	Baltimore, Maryland	United States	Completed as Samwater for Ministry of War Transport
9 August	George Kenny	Liberty ship	California Shipbuilding Corporation	Los Angeles, California	United States	For War Shipping Administration
9 August	Jeremiah M. Daly	Liberty ship	Permanente Metals Corporation	Richmond, California	United States	For War Shipping Administration
10 August	Duncan U. Fletcher	Liberty ship	J. A. Jones Construction Company	Panama City, Florida	United States	For War Shipping Administration
10 August	James M. Gillis	Liberty ship	Bethlehem Fairfield Shipyard	Baltimore, Maryland	United States	For War Shipping Administration
10 August	R. M. Williamson	Liberty ship	Todd Houston Shipbuilding Corporation	Houston, Texas	United States	For War Shipping Administration
10 August	R. P. Warner	Liberty ship	Oregon Shipbuilding Corporation	Portland, Oregon	United States	For War Shipping Administration
11 August	Augustus S. Merrimon	Liberty ship	North Carolina Shipbuilding Company	Wilmington, North Carolina	United States	For War Shipping Administration
11 August	David R. Francis	Liberty ship	California Shipbuilding Corporation	Los Angeles, California	United States	For War Shipping Administration
11 August	Mary Patten	Liberty ship	Permanente Metals Corporation	Richmond, California	United States	For War Shipping Administration
11 August	William S. Thayner	Liberty ship	Bethlehem Fairfield Shipyard	Baltimore, Maryland	United States	For War Shipping Administration
12 August	Ferdinando Gorges	Liberty ship	New England Shipbuilding Corporation	South Portland, Maine	United States	For War Shipping Administration
12 August	Henry L. Abott	Liberty ship	Oregon Shipbuilding Corporation	Portland, Oregon	United States	For War Shipping Administration
12 August	Horace Wells	Liberty ship	Permanente Metals Corporation	Richmond, California	United States	For War Shipping Administration
12 August	John Mason	Liberty ship	New England Shipbuilding Corporation	South Portland, Maine	United States	For War Shipping Administration
12 August	Lionel Copley	Liberty ship	Bethlehem Fairfield Shipyard	Baltimore, Maryland	United States	Completed as Sambrake for Ministry of War Transport
12 August	Thomas G. Masaryk	Liberty ship	California Shipbuilding Corporation	Los Angeles, California	United States	For War Shipping Administration
12 August	William Sturgis	Liberty ship	New England Shipbuilding Corporation	South Portland, Maine	United States	For War Shipping Administration
13 August	Empire Pierrot	Near-Warrior type tug	A. Hall & Co. Ltd	Aberdeen	United Kingdom	For Ministry of War Transport
13 August	Henry Van Dyke	Liberty ship	Bethlehem Fairfield Shipyard	Baltimore, Maryland	United States	Completed as Samhain for Ministry of War Transport
13 August	Hiram Bingham	Liberty ship	Permanente Metals Corporation	Richmond, California	United States	For War Shipping Administration
13 August	Santander	Hansa A Type cargo ship	Deutsche Werft	Hamburg	Germany	For Oldenburg Portugiesische Dampschiffs Rhederei
14 August	C. J. Jones	Liberty ship	Oregon Shipbuilding Corporation	Portland, Oregon	United States	Completed as Sambut for Ministry of War Transport
14 August	David Holmes	Liberty ship	Delta Shipbuilding	New Orleans, Louisiana	United States	For War Shipping Administration
14 August	Empire Duchess	Cargo ship	Short Brothers Ltd	Sunderland	United Kingdom	For Ministry of War Transport
14 August	Gutzon Borlum	Liberty ship	California Shipbuilding Corporation	Los Angeles, California	United States	For War Shipping Administration
14 August	Jesse Billingsley	Liberty ship	Todd Houston Shipbuilding Corporation	Houston, Texas	United States	For War Shipping Administration
14 August	John A. Campbell	Liberty ship	J. A. Jones Construction Co	Brunswick, Georgia	United States	For War Shipping Administration
14 August	Matthew Brush	Liberty ship	Bethlehem Fairfield Shipyard	Baltimore, Maryland	United States	Completed as Samoa for Ministry of War Transport
14 August	Montford Stokes	Liberty ship	North Carolina Shipbuilding Company	Wilmington, North Carolina	United States	For War Shipping Administration
14 August	TID 23	TID-class tug	Richard Dunston Ltd	Thorne	United Kingdom	For the War Department
14 August	William D. Burnham	Liberty ship	Permanente Metals Corporation	Richmond, California	United States	For War Shipping Administration
15 August	Alaska	Alaska-class large cruiser	New York Shipbuilding Corporation	Camden, NJ	United States	
15 August	Antoine Saugrain	Liberty ship	Permanente Metals Corporation	Richmond, California	United States	For War Shipping Administration
15 August	David Thompson	Liberty ship	Oregon Shipbuilding Corporation	Portland, Oregon	United States	For War Shipping Administration
15 August	Henry Jocelyn	Liberty ship	New England Shipbuilding Corporation	South Portland, Maine	United States	For War Shipping Administration
15 August	Winifred S. Stratton	Liberty ship	Permanente Metals Corporation	Richmond, California	United States	For War Shipping Administration
16 August	Cape Marshall	Type C1-S-AY-1 cargo ship	Consolidated Steel Corporation	Wilmington, California	United States	For War Shipping Administration
16 August	Joseph Reynolds	Liberty ship	California Shipbuilding Corporation	Los Angeles, California	United States	For War Shipping Administration
16 August	TID 38	TID-class tug	Richard Dunston Ltd	Thorne	United Kingdom	For Ministry of War Transport
16 August	Torridge	River-class minesweeper	Blyth Dry Docks & Shipbuilding Co. Ltd	Blyth, Northumberland	United Kingdom	For Royal Navy
17 August	Condesa	Cargo ship	R. & W. Hawthorn, Leslie and Co. Ltd	Newcastle upon Tyne	United Kingdom	For Furness-Houlder Argentine Lines Ltd.
17 August	Dunham Wright	Liberty ship	Oregon Shipbuilding Corporation	Portland, Oregon	United States	For War Shipping Administration
17 August	Midway	Casablanca-class escort carrier	Kaiser Shipyards	Vancouver, Washington	United States	Converted S4 merchant hull
17 August	Sarmiento	Cargo ship	Harland & Wolff	Belfast	United Kingdom	For Pacific Steam Navigation Company
17 August	Victor F. Lawson	Liberty ship	California Shipbuilding Corporation	Los Angeles, California	United States	Completed as Sampep for Ministry of War Transport
17 August	Wasp	Essex-class aircraft carrier	Bethlehem Shipbuilding	Quincy, MA	United States	
18 August	Holland Thompson	Liberty ship	Bethlehem Fairfield Shipyard	Baltimore, Maryland	United States	Completed as Samite for Ministry of War Transport
18 August	Thomas Pollock	Liberty ship	North Carolina Shipbuilding Company	Wilmington, North Carolina	United States	For War Shipping Administration
18 August	William Kelly	Liberty ship	California Shipbuilding Corporation	Los Angeles, California	United States	For War Shipping Administration
19 August	Berkeley Castle	Castle-class corvette	Barclay, Curle & Co. Ltd.	Glasgow	United Kingdom	For Royal Navy
19 August	B. F. Irvine	Liberty ship	Oregon Shipbuilding Corporation	Portland, Oregon	United States	For War Shipping Administration
19 August	Edwin W. Moore	Liberty ship	Todd Houston Shipbuilding Corporation	Houston, Texas	United States	For War Shipping Administration
19 August	Empire Trail	Cargo ship	Shipbuilding Corporation Ltd	Sunderland	United Kingdom	For Ministry of War Transport
19 August	James Lick	Liberty ship	Permanente Metals Corporation	Richmond, California	United States	For War Shipping Administration
19 August	John W. Garrett	Liberty ship	Bethlehem Fairfield Shipyard	Baltimore, Maryland	United States	For War Shipping Administration
19 August	Joseph E. Brown	Liberty ship	Southeastern Shipbuilding Corporation	Savannah, Georgia	United States	For War Shipping Administration
19 August	Mahanada	Cargo ship	William Hamilton & Co. Ltd.	Port Glasgow	United Kingdom	For T. & J. Brocklebank Ltd.
19 August	Pincher	Algerine-class minesweeper	Harland & Wolff	Belfast	United Kingdom	For Royal Navy
19 August	Port MacQuarie	Cargo ship	Swan, Hunter & Wigham Richardson Ltd	Wallsend	United Kingdom	For Port Line Ltd
19 August	Stephen W. Kearny	Liberty ship	Permanente Metals Corporation	Richmond, California	United States	For War Shipping Administration
19 August	TID 24	TID-class tug	Richard Dunston Ltd	Thorne	United Kingdom	For the Admiralty
20 August	James Rowan	Liberty ship	Permanente Metals Corporation	Richmond, California	United States	For War Shipping Administration
20 August	TID 39	TID-class tug	Richard Dunston Ltd	Thorne	United Kingdom	For the War Department
20 August	William Byrd	Liberty ship	St. Johns River Shipbuilding Company	Jacksonville, Florida	United States	For War Shipping Administration
21 August	David F. Barry	Liberty ship	Oregon Shipbuilding Corporation	Portland, Oregon	United States	For War Shipping Administration
21 August	Frank Wiggins	Liberty ship	California Shipbuilding Corporation	Los Angeles, California	United States	For War Shipping Administration
21 August	George Bellows	Liberty ship	Todd Houston Shipbuilding Corporation	Houston, Texas	United States	For War Shipping Administration
21 August	John Branch	Liberty ship	North Carolina Shipbuilding Company	Wilmington, North Carolina	United States	For War Shipping Administration
21 August	St. Joseph	Bogue-class escort carrier	Seattle-Tacoma Shipyard	Tacoma, Washington	United States	Converted C3 merchant freighter for Lend-Lease as HMS Ruler
21 August	Tench Tilghman	Liberty ship	Bethlehem Fairfield Shipyard	Baltimore, Maryland	United States	Completed as Samos for Ministry of War Transport
22 August	Bartholomew Gosnold	Liberty ship	New England Shipbuilding Corporation	South Portland, Maine	United States	For War Shipping Administration
22 August	Emma Lazarus	Liberty ship	Bethlehem Fairfield Shipyard	Baltimore, Maryland	United States	Completed as Samara for Ministry of War Transport
22 August	Floyd Bennett	Liberty ship	Permanente Metals Corporation	Richmond, California	United States	For War Shipping Administration
22 August	Richard Moczkowski	Liberty ship	Permanente Metals Corporation	Richmond, California	United States	For War Shipping Administration
22 August	Thomas J. Walsh	Liberty ship	Oregon Shipbuilding Corporation	Portland, Oregon	United States	For War Shipping Administration
22 August	Victor Herbert	Liberty ship	J. A. Jones Construction Company	Panama City, Florida	United States	For War Shipping Administration
23 August	Don Marquis	Liberty ship	California Shipbuilding Corporation	Los Angeles, California	United States	For War Shipping Administration
23 August	Empire Runner	Severn type collier, collier	Richard Dunston Ltd	Thorne	United Kingdom	For Ministry of War Transport
23 August	Empire Skipper	Severn type collier, coaster	Richard Dunston Ltd	Thorne	United Kingdom	For Ministry of War Transport
23 August	Malika	Cargo ship	Lithgows Ltd	Port Glasgow	United Kingdom	For Asiatic Steam Navigation Co. Ltd.
24 August	Charles C. Long	Liberty ship	Bethlehem Fairfield Shipyard	Baltimore, Maryland	United States	Completed as Samur for Ministry of War Transport
24 August	John Colter	Liberty ship	Permanente Metals Corporation	Richmond, California	United States	For War Shipping Administration
24 August	Julesburg	T2 Tanker	Alabama Drydock and Shipbuilding Company	Mobile, Alabama	United States	For War Shipping Administration
24 August	Peter De Smet	Liberty ship	Oregon Shipbuilding Corporation	Portland, Oregon	United States	For War Shipping Administration
25 August	Mary M. Dodge	Liberty ship	Permanente Metals Corporation	Richmond, California	United States	For War Shipping Administration
25 August	Mission Purisima	T2 tanker	Marinship Corporation	Sausalito, California	United States	For United States Maritime Commission
25 August	Peter Cooper	Liberty ship	Bethlehem Fairfield Shipyard	Baltimore, Maryland	United States	Completed as Samarkand for Ministry of War Transport
25 August	TID 25	TID-class tug	Richard Dunston Ltd	Thorne	United Kingdom	For the Admiralty
25 August	Weserstrom	Hansa A Type cargo ship	J Cockerill SA	Antwerp	Belgium	For Norddeutscher Lloyd
26 August	David Belasco	Liberty ship	Permanente Metals Corporation	Richmond, California	United States	For War Shipping Administration
26 August	David Wilmot	Liberty ship	Todd Houston Shipbuilding Corporation	Houston, Texas	United States	For War Shipping Administration
26 August	James Blair	Liberty ship	Bethlehem Fairfield Shipyard	Baltimore, Maryland	United States	Completed as Samarina for Ministry of War Transport
26 August	James M. Clements	Liberty ship	Oregon Shipbuilding Corporation	Portland, Oregon	United States	For War Shipping Administration
26 August	Reginald A. Fessenden	Liberty ship	Delta Shipbuilding	New Orleans, Louisiana	United States	For War Shipping Administration
27 August	Dudley M. Hughes	Liberty ship	Southeastern Shipbuilding Corporation	Savannah, Georgia	United States	For War Shipping Administration
27 August	Edward N. Westcott	Liberty ship	Oregon Shipbuilding Corporation	Portland, Oregon	United States	For War Shipping Administration
27 August	Joseph Francis	Liberty ship	California Shipbuilding Corporation	Los Angeles, California	United States	For War Shipping Administration
28 August	Dwight B. Heard	Liberty ship	California Shipbuilding Corporation	Los Angeles, California	United States	Completed as Sambur for Ministry of War Transport
28 August	Emile Berliner	Liberty ship	Permanente Metals Corporation	Richmond, California	United States	For War Shipping Administration
28 August	Lark	Black Swan-class sloop			United Kingdom	
28 August	William Smallwood	Liberty ship	Bethlehem Fairfield Shipyard	Baltimore, Maryland	United States	Completed as Sampa for Ministry of War Transport
29 August	Charles A. Broadwater	Liberty ship	Oregon Shipbuilding Corporation	Portland, Oregon	United States	Completed as Samthar for Ministry of War Transport
29 August	Charles G. Coutant	Liberty ship	Permanente Metals Corporation	Richmond, California	United States	For War Shipping Administration
29 August	John M. Harlan	Liberty ship	J. A. Jones Construction Co	Brunswick, Georgia	United States	For War Shipping Administration
29 August	John S. Bassett	Liberty ship	Permanente Metals Corporation	Richmond, California	United States	For War Shipping Administration
30 August	Albert P. Ryder	Liberty ship	California Shipbuilding Corporation	Los Angeles, California	United States	For War Shipping Administration
30 August	Hornet	Essex-class aircraft carrier	Newport News Shipbuilding	Newport News, VA	United States	
30 August	Pine Ridge	T2 Tanker	Alabama Drydock and Shipbuilding Company	Mobile, Alabama	United States	For War Shipping Administration
30 August	Tarkwa	Cargo ship	Caledon Shipbuilding & Engineering Company	Dundee	United Kingdom	For Elder Dempster Lines
30 August	TID 40	TID-class tug	Richard Dunston Ltd	Thorne	United Kingdom	For Ministry of War Transport
31 August	Anna Howard Shaw	Liberty ship	New England Shipbuilding Corporation	South Portland, Maine	United States	For War Shipping Administration
31 August	Cormead	C-type coaster	S. P. Austin & Sons Ltd	Sunderland	United Kingdom	For Wm. Cory & Sons Ltd.
31 August	Cyrus H. K. Curtis	Liberty ship	New England Shipbuilding Corporation	South Portland, Maine	United States	For War Shipping Administration
31 August	Empire Dirk	Scandinavian type cargo ship	Ailsa Shipbuilding Co. Ltd	Troon	United Kingdom	For Ministry of War Transport
31 August	Empire Housman	Cargo ship	William Doxford & Sons Ltd.	Pallion	United Kingdom	For Ministry of War Transport
31 August	Empire Pickwick	Cargo ship	John Readhead & Sons Ltd	South Shields	United Kingdom	For Ministry of War Transport
31 August	Empire Ransom	Scandinavian type cargo ship	William Gray & Co. Ltd	West Hartlepool	United Kingdom	For Ministry of War Transport
31 August	Empire Villager	Icemaid type collier	Grangemouth Dockyard Co. Ltd	Grangemouth	United Kingdom	For Ministry of War Transport
31 August	James T. Earle	Liberty ship	Bethlehem Fairfield Shipyard	Baltimore, Maryland	United States	Completed as Samaye for Ministry of War Transport
31 August	John Reed	Liberty ship	Permanente Metals Corporation	Richmond, California	United States	For War Shipping Administration
31 August	John W. Hoyt	Liberty ship	Permanente Metals Corporation	Richmond, California	United States	For War Shipping Administration
31 August	Neritina	Tanker	Harland & Wolff Ltd	Govan	United Kingdom	For Anglo-Saxon Petroleum Co. Ltd
31 August	Samson Occum	Liberty ship	California Shipbuilding Corporation	Los Angeles, California	United States	Completed as Samarinda for Ministry of War Transport
31 August	Samuel H. Walker	Liberty ship	Todd Houston Shipbuilding Corporation	Houston, Texas	United States	For War Shipping Administration
31 August	William De Witt Hyde	Liberty ship	New England Shipbuilding Corporation	South Portland, Maine	United States	For War Shipping Administration

== September ==
Date	Ship	Class	Builder	Location	Country	Notes
1 September	James L. Breck	Liberty ship	Oregon Shipbuilding Corporation	Portland, Oregon	United States	For War Shipping Administration.
1 September	Joseph W. Folk	Liberty ship	Oregon Shipbuilding Corporation	Portland, Oregon	United States	For War Shipping Administration.
1 September	Umtata	Cargo ship	Swan, Hunter & Wigham Richardson Ltd.	Newcastle upon Tyne	United Kingdom	For Bullard, King & Co.
1 September	William E. Pendleton	Liberty ship	Delta Shipbuilding	New Orleans, Louisiana	United States	For War Shipping Administration.
2 September	Empire Winnie	Larch-class tug	Clelands (Successors) Ltd.	Willington Quay-on-Tyne	United Kingdom	For the Admiralty.
2 September	Henry L. Ellsworth	Liberty ship	Delta Shipbuilding	New Orleans, Louisiana	United States	For War Shipping Administration.
2 September	Sidney Edgerton	Liberty ship	Oregon Shipbuilding Corporation	Portland, Oregon	United States	For War Shipping Administration.
2 September	Tripoli	Casablanca-class escort carrier	Kaiser Shipyards	Vancouver, Washington	United States	Converted S4 merchant hull
2 September	Wayne MacVeagh	Liberty ship	Permanente Metals Corporation	Richmond, California	United States	For War Shipping Administration.
3 September	Empire Vincent	Near-Warrior type tug	Cochrane & Son Ltd.	Selby	United Kingdom	For Ministry of War Transport.
3 September	Orville P. Taylor	Liberty ship	Bethlehem Fairfield Shipyard	Baltimore, Maryland	United States	Completed as Samothrace for Ministry of War Transport.
3 September	TID 26	TID-class tug	Richard Dunston Ltd.	Thorne	United Kingdom	For the War Department.
3 September	TID 41	TID-class tug	Richard Dunston Ltd.	Thorne	United Kingdom	For Ministry of War Transport.
4 September	Albino Perez	Liberty ship	California Shipbuilding Corporation	Los Angeles, California	United States	For War Shipping Administration.
4 September	Harmon Judson	Liberty ship	Permanente Metals Corporation	Richmond, California	United States	For War Shipping Administration.
4 September	Marie M. Meloney	Liberty ship	Bethlehem Fairfield Shipyard	Baltimore, Maryland	United States	For War Shipping Administration.
4 September	Robert S. Bean	Liberty ship	Oregon Shipbuilding Corporation	Portland, Oregon	United States	For War Shipping Administration.
4 September	Rufus C. Dawes	Liberty ship	St. Johns River Shipbuilding Company	Jacksonville, Florida	United States	For War Shipping Administration.
5 September	Nathaniel Crosby	Liberty ship	Oregon Shipbuilding Corporation	Portland, Oregon	United States	For War Shipping Administration.
6 September	Erastus Smith	Liberty ship	Todd Houston Shipbuilding Corporation	Houston, Texas	United States	For War Shipping Administration.
6 September	Henry M. Teller	Liberty ship	Permanente Metals Corporation	Richmond, California	United States	For War Shipping Administration.
6 September	Heywood Broun	Liberty ship	Bethlehem Fairfield Shipyard	Baltimore, Maryland	United States	For War Shipping Administration.
6 September	Howell E. Jackson	Liberty ship	J. A. Jones Construction Co.	Brunswick, Georgia	United States	For War Shipping Administration.
6 September	Jerome K. Jones	Liberty ship	Southeastern Shipbuilding Corporation	Savannah, Georgia	United States	For War Shipping Administration.
6 September	John I. Nolan	Liberty ship	Oregon Shipbuilding Corporation	Portland, Oregon	United States	For War Shipping Administration.
6 September	Vachel Lindsay	Liberty ship	Permanente Metals Corporation	Richmond, California	United States	For War Shipping Administration.
7 September	Philip F. Thomas	Liberty ship	Bethlehem Fairfield Shipyard	Baltimore, Maryland	United States	For War Shipping Administration.
8 September	Ben T. Osborne	Liberty ship	Oregon Shipbuilding Corporation	Portland, Oregon	United States	For War Shipping Administration.
8 September	Jeremiah M. Rusk	Liberty ship	Permanente Metals Corporation	Richmond, California	United States	For War Shipping Administration.
8 September	Joseph Tipton	Liberty ship	California Shipbuilding Corporation	Los Angeles, California	United States	Completed as Samtredy for Ministry of War Transport.
8 September	Mission Santa Cruz	T2 tanker	Marinship Corporation	Sausalito, California	United States	For United States Maritime Commission.
9 September	Benjamin H. Brewster	Liberty ship	Permanente Metals Corporation	Richmond, California	United States	For War Shipping Administration.
9 September	Caleb C. Wheeler	Liberty ship	Bethlehem Fairfield Shipyard	Baltimore, Maryland	United States	For War Shipping Administration.
9 September	James S. Lawson	Liberty ship	Oregon Shipbuilding Corporation	Portland, Oregon	United States	For War Shipping Administration.
9 September	Michael Casey	Liberty ship	Permanente Metals Corporation	Richmond, California	United States	For War Shipping Administration.
9 September	Powder River	T2 Tanker	Alabama Drydock and Shipbuilding Company	Mobile, Alabama	United States	For War Shipping Administration.
9 September	St. Simon	Bogue-class escort carrier	Seattle-Tacoma Shipyard	Tacoma, Washington	United States	Converted C3 merchant freighter for Lend-Lease as HMS Arbiter
9 September	TID 27	TID-class tug	Richard Dunston Ltd.	Thorne	United Kingdom	For the Admiralty.
10 September	Lorrin A. Thurston	Liberty ship	California Shipbuilding Corporation	Los Angeles, California	United States	Completed as Samcella for Ministry of War Transport.
10 September	Midwest Farmer	Liberty ship	Oregon Shipbuilding Corporation	Portland, Oregon	United States	For War Shipping Administration.
11 September	Charles E. Smith	Liberty ship	Permanente Metals Corporation	Richmond, California	United States	For War Shipping Administration.
11 September	Empire Humphrey	Near-Warrior type tug	Cochrane & Sons Ltd .	Selby	United Kingdom	For Ministry of War Transport.
11 September	Hawkins Fudske	Liberty ship	Bethlehem Fairfield Shipyard	Baltimore, Maryland	United States	For War Shipping Administration.
11 September	Thomas Sully	Liberty ship	St. Johns River Shipbuilding Company	Jacksonville, Florida	United States	For War Shipping Administration.
11 September	Tobias Lear	Liberty ship	New England Shipbuilding Corporation	South Portland, Maine	United States	For War Shipping Administration.
11 September	Wake Island	Casablanca-class escort carrier	Kaiser Shipyards	Vancouver, Washington	United States	Converted S4 merchant hull
12 September	Annie Oakley	Liberty ship	California Shipbuilding Corporation	Los Angeles, California	United States	Completed as Samida for Ministry of War Transport.
12 September	Arthur P. Gorman	Liberty ship	Bethlehem Fairfield Shipyard	Baltimore, Maryland	United States	For War Shipping Administration.
12 September	Victor C. Vaughan	Liberty ship	Oregon Shipbuilding Corporation	Portland, Oregon	United States	Completed as Samzona for Ministry of War Transport.
13 September	Charles Devens	Liberty ship	Permanente Metals Corporation	Richmond, California	United States	For War Shipping Administration.
13 September	Henry Lomb	Liberty ship	Bethlehem Fairfield Shipyard	Baltimore, Maryland	United States	For War Shipping Administration.
13 September	Jose Navarro	Liberty ship	Todd Houston Shipbuilding Corporation	Houston, Texas	United States	For War Shipping Administration.
13 September	Julius Rosenwald	Liberty ship	J. A. Jones Construction Company	Panama City, Florida	United States	For War Shipping Administration.
13 September	Murat Halstead	Liberty ship	Permanente Metals Corporation	Richmond, California	United States	For War Shipping Administration.
13 September	William S. Ladd	Liberty ship	Oregon Shipbuilding Corporation	Portland, Oregon	United States	For War Shipping Administration.
14 September	Amenity	Coaster	Goole Shipbuilding & Repairing Co. Ltd.	Goole	United Kingdom	For F. T. Everard & Sons Ltd.
14 September	Empire Ploughman	Cargo ship	William Gray & Co. Ltd.	West Hartlepool	United Kingdom	For Ministry of War Transport.
14 September	Empire Stronghold	Cargo ship	Sir W. G. Armstrong, Whitworth & Co. Ltd.	Newcastle upon Tyne	United Kingdom	For Ministry of War Transport.
14 September	Henry M. Stanley	Liberty ship	California Shipbuilding Corporation	Los Angeles, California	United States	Completed as Samneva for Ministry of War Transport.
14 September	Joseph Goldberger	Liberty ship	Delta Shipbuilding	New Orleans, Louisiana	United States	For War Shipping Administration.
14 September	Louis A. Sengteller	Liberty ship	Permanente Metals Corporation	Richmond, California	United States	For War Shipping Administration.
14 September	Park Holland	Liberty ship	New England Shipbuilding Corporation	South Portland, Maine	United States	For War Shipping Administration.
14 September	Peregrine White	Liberty ship	New England Shipbuilding Corporation	South Portland, Maine	United States	For War Shipping Administration.
14 September	TID 42	TID-class tug	Richard Dunston Ltd.	Thorne	United Kingdom	For Ministry of War Transport.
15 September	Empire Rider	Coaster	J Scott & Sons Ltd	Bowling	United Kingdom	For Ministry of War Transport
15 September	Empire Beresford	Norwegian type Tanker	Sir J. Laing & Sons Ltd.`	Sunderland	United Kingdom	For Ministry of War Transport.
15 September	Frederick Billings	Liberty ship	Oregon Shipbuilding Corporation	Portland, Oregon	United States	For War Shipping Administration.
15 September	Patrick C. Boyle	Liberty ship	Bethlehem Fairfield Shipyard	Baltimore, Maryland	United States	For War Shipping Administration.
15 September	Vivid	V-class submarine	Vickers-Armstrongs	Newcastle-upon-Tyne	United Kingdom	
16 September	Anthony Ravalli	Liberty ship	Oregon Shipbuilding Corporation	Portland, Oregon	United States	For War Shipping Administration.
16 September	Donald M. Dickinson	Liberty ship	Permanente Metals Corporation	Richmond, California	United States	For War Shipping Administration.
16 September	Empire Sceptre	Cargo ship	William Doxford & Sons Ltd.	Pallion	United Kingdom	For Ministry of War Transport.
16 September	George Uhler	Liberty ship	Bethlehem Fairfield Shipyard	Baltimore, Maryland	United States	For War Shipping Administration.
16 September	Hoke Smith	Liberty ship	Southeastern Shipbuilding Corporation	Savannah, Georgia	United States	For War Shipping Administration.
16 September	Irwin Russell	Liberty ship	Delta Shipbuilding	New Orleans, Louisiana	United States	For War Shipping Administration.
17 September	Augustus Thomas	Liberty ship	Permanente Metals Corporation	Richmond, California	United States	For War Shipping Administration.
17 September	Edmund F. Dickens	Liberty ship	Oregon Shipbuilding Corporation	Portland, Oregon	United States	For War Shipping Administration.
17 September	Henry Wells	Liberty ship	Permanente Metals Corporation	Richmond, California	United States	For War Shipping Administration.
17 September	TID 28	TID-class tug	Richard Dunston Ltd.	Thorne	United Kingdom	For the Admiralty.
17 September	TID 43	TID-class tug	Richard Dunston Ltd.	Thorne	United Kingdom	For the Admiralty.
18 September	Empire Cricketer	Empire Lad-class coastal tanker	Isaac Pimblott & Sons Ltd.	Northwich	United Kingdom	For Ministry of War Transport.
18 September	Margaret Brent	Liberty ship	Bethlehem Fairfield Shipyard	Baltimore, Maryland	United States	For War Shipping Administration.
19 September	E. H. Sothern	Liberty ship	California Shipbuilding Corporation	Los Angeles, California	United States	Completed as Sammont for Ministry of War Transport.
19 September	Francis Vigo	Liberty ship	Bethlehem Fairfield Shipyard	Baltimore, Maryland	United States	For War Shipping Administration.
19 September	George Sterling	Liberty ship	Permanente Metals Corporation	Richmond, California	United States	For War Shipping Administration.
19 September	James J. O'Kelly	Liberty ship	Permanente Metals Corporation	Richmond, California	United States	For War Shipping Administration.
19 September	John F. Myers	Liberty ship	Oregon Shipbuilding Corporation	Portland, Oregon	United States	For War Shipping Administration.
19 September	William H. Todd	Liberty ship	New England Shipbuilding Corporation	South Portland, Maine	United States	For War Shipping Administration.
20 September	David B. Henderson	Liberty ship	Oregon Shipbuilding Corporation	Portland, Oregon	United States	For War Shipping Administration.
20 September	Edward D. White	Liberty ship	J. A. Jones Construction Co.	Brunswick, Georgia	United States	For War Shipping Administration.
20 September	Quemado Lake	T2 Tanker	Alabama Drydock and Shipbuilding Company	Mobile, Alabama	United States	For War Shipping Administration.
20 September	Waiwera	Refrigerated cargo ship	Harland & Wolff	Belfast	United Kingdom	For Shaw Savill Line.
20 September	William H. Moody	Liberty ship	Permanente Metals Corporation	Richmond, California	United States	For War Shipping Administration.
21 September	Ben F. Dixon	Liberty ship	Bethlehem Fairfield Shipyard	Baltimore, Maryland	United States	For War Shipping Administration.
21 September	Dwight W. Morrow	Liberty ship	St. Johns River Shipbuilding Company	Jacksonville, Florida	United States	For War Shipping Administration.
21 September	John M. Bozeman	Liberty ship	Oregon Shipbuilding Corporation	Portland, Oregon	United States	For War Shipping Administration.
22 September	Henry C. Payne	Liberty ship	Permanente Metals Corporation	Richmond, California	United States	For War Shipping Administration.
22 September	John J. McGraw	Liberty ship	Bethlehem Fairfield Shipyard	Baltimore, Maryland	United States	Completed as Samariz for Ministry of War Transport.
22 September	Thomas Howell	Liberty ship	Oregon Shipbuilding Corporation	Portland, Oregon	United States	For War Shipping Administration.
22 September	TID 29	TID-class tug	Richard Dunston Ltd.	Thorne	United Kingdom	For the War Department.
23 September	Adolph S. Ochs	Liberty ship	Bethlehem Fairfield Shipyard	Baltimore, Maryland	United States	Completed as Samwyo for Ministry of War Transport.
23 September	George Von L. Meyer	Liberty ship	Permanente Metals Corporation	Richmond, California	United States	For War Shipping Administration.
23 September	Reinhold Richter	Liberty ship	Permanente Metals Corporation	Richmond, California	United States	For War Shipping Administration.
23 September	William Crompton	Liberty ship	Delta Shipbuilding	New Orleans, Louisiana	United States	For War Shipping Administration.
24 September	James D. Doty	Liberty ship	Oregon Shipbuilding Corporation	Portland, Oregon	United States	For War Shipping Administration.
24 September	Joshua A. Leach	Liberty ship	Todd Houston Shipbuilding Corporation	Houston, Texas	United States	For War Shipping Administration.
	Mission Soledad	T2 tanker	Marinship Corporation	Sausalito, California	United States	For United States Maritime Commission.
24 September	Paul Chandler	Liberty ship	California Shipbuilding Corporation	Los Angeles, California	United States	For War Shipping Administration.
25 September	Andrew A. Humphreys	Liberty ship	Delta Shipbuilding	New Orleans, Louisiana	United States	For War Shipping Administration.
25 September	Current	Diver-class rescue and salvage ship	Basalt Rock Company	Napa, California	United States	
25 September	James Phelan	Liberty ship	Permanente Metals Corporation	Richmond, California	United States	For War Shipping Administration.
25 September	Nikola Tesla	Liberty ship	Bethlehem Fairfield Shipyard	Baltimore, Maryland	United States	Completed as Samkansa for Ministry of War Transport.
25 September	Pampas	Cargo ship	Harland & Wolff	Belfast	United Kingdom	For Royal Mail Line.
25 September	Prince L. Campbell	Liberty ship	Oregon Shipbuilding Corporation	Portland, Oregon	United States	For War Shipping Administration.
25 September	William Sharon	Liberty ship	Permanente Metals Corporation	Richmond, California	United States	For War Shipping Administration.
26 September	Franz Boas	Liberty ship	Bethlehem Fairfield Shipyard	Baltimore, Maryland	United States	Completed as Sammex for Ministry of War Transport.
26 September	Otto Mears	Liberty ship	Permanente Metals Corporation	Richmond, California	United States	For War Shipping Administration.
26 September	San Jacinto	Independence-class light aircraft carrier	New York Shipbuilding Corporation	Camden, NJ	United States	Converted cruiser hull
27 September	Dolly Madison	Liberty ship	J. A. Jones Construction Company	Panama City, Florida	United States	For War Shipping Administration.
27 September	John Russell Pope	Liberty ship	Bethlehem Fairfield Shipyard	Baltimore, Maryland	United States	Completed as Samdak for Ministry of War Transport.
27 September	Manasseh Culter	Liberty ship	Oregon Shipbuilding Corporation	Portland, Oregon	United States	Completed as Samouri for Ministry of War Transport.
27 September	Vermillion	Bogue-class escort carrier	Seattle-Tacoma Shipyard	Tacoma, Washington	United States	Converted C3 merchant freighter for Lend-Lease as HMS Smiter
27 September	White Plains	Casablanca-class escort carrier	Kaiser Shipyards	Vancouver, Washington	United States	Converted S4 merchant hull
27 September	William Black Yates	Liberty ship	Southeastern Shipbuilding Corporation	Savannah, Georgia	United States	For War Shipping Administration.
28 September	Harvey C. Miller	Liberty ship	Todd Houston Shipbuilding Corporation	Houston, Texas	United States	For War Shipping Administration.
28 September	Horace Bushnell	Liberty ship	Bethlehem Fairfield Shipyard	Baltimore, Maryland	United States	For War Shipping Administration.
28 September	John G. Brady	Liberty ship	Oregon Shipbuilding Corporation	Portland, Oregon	United States	For War Shipping Administration.
28 September	Knaresborough Castle	Castle-class corvette	Blyth Dry Docks & Shipbuilding Co. Ltd	Blyth, Northumberland	United Kingdom	For Royal Navy.
28 September	Long Branch	Flower-class corvette	Harland & Wolff	Govan	United Kingdom	For Royal Canadian Navy.
29 September	Empire Mackendrick	MAC ship	Burntisland Shipbuilding Co. Ltd.	Burntisland	United Kingdom	For Ministry of War Transport.
29 September	Frank Norris	Liberty ship	Permanente Metals Corporation	Richmond, California	United States	For War Shipping Administration.
29 September	Jean Nicolet	Liberty ship	Oregon Shipbuilding Corporation	Portland, Oregon	United States	For War Shipping Administration.
29 September	Plucky	Algerine-class minesweeper	Harland & Wolff	Belfast	United Kingdom	For Royal Navy.
29 September	TID 44	TID-class tug	Richard Dunston Ltd.	Thorne	United Kingdom	For the Admiralty.
29 September	TID 47	TID-class tug	Richard Dunston Ltd.	Thorne	United Kingdom	For the Admiralty.
30 September	Empire Bounty	Wave-class oiler	Furness Shipbuilding Co. Ltd.	Haverton Hill-on-Tees	United Kingdom	For Ministry of War Transport.
30 September	Francis M. Smith	Liberty ship	Permanente Metals Corporation	Richmond, California	United States	For War Shipping Administration.
30 September	Harriet Hosmer	Liberty ship	J. A. Jones Construction Company	Panama City, Florida	United States	For War Shipping Administration.
30 September	Hind	Black Swan-class sloop			United Kingdom	
30 September	John G. North	Liberty ship	Permanente Metals Corporation	Richmond, California	United States	For War Shipping Administration.
30 September	John N. Robins	Liberty ship	New England Shipbuilding Corporation	South Portland, Maine	United States	For War Shipping Administration.
30 September	Rosebud	T2 Tanker	Alabama Drydock and Shipbuilding Company	Mobile, Alabama	United States	For War Shipping Administration.
30 September	TID 45	TID-class tug	Richard Dunston Ltd.	Thorne	United Kingdom	For the Admiralty.
30 September	W. G. Ayer	Liberty ship	Oregon Shipbuilding Corporation	Portland, Oregon	United States	For War Shipping Administration.

== October ==
Date	Ship	Class	Builder	Location	Country	Notes
1 October	Empire Blessing	Cargo ship	Bartram & Sons Ltd	Sunderland	United Kingdom	For Ministry of War Transport
1 October	Herefordshire	Cargo ship	Barclay, Curle & Co. Ltd.	Glasgow	United Kingdom	For Bibby Line.
1 October	James H. Couper	Liberty ship	Southeastern Shipbuilding Corporation	Savannah, Georgia	United States	For War Shipping Administration.
1 October	Joyce Kilmer	Liberty ship	Bethlehem Fairfield Shipyard	Baltimore, Maryland	United States	For War Shipping Administration.
2 October	Charles Nordhoff	Liberty ship	Oregon Shipbuilding Corporation	Portland, Oregon	United States	For War Shipping Administration.
2 October	Empire Beaconsfield	Scandinavian type cargo ship	William Gray & Co. Ltd.	West Hartlepool	United Kingdom	For Ministry of War Transport.
2 October	Frank A. Munsey	Liberty ship	Permanente Metals Corporation	Richmond, California	United States	For War Shipping Administration.
3 October	Frederick A. Eilers	Liberty ship	Permanente Metals Corporation	Richmond, California	United States	For War Shipping Administration.
3 October	Jesse De Forest	Liberty ship	Bethlehem Fairfield Shipyard	Baltimore, Maryland	United States	Completed as Samuta for Ministry of War Transport.
3 October	John S. Mosby	Liberty ship	St. Johns River Shipbuilding Company	Jacksonville, Florida	United States	For War Shipping Administration.
3 October	Simon Bamberger	Liberty ship	Permanente Metals Corporation	Richmond, California	United States	For War Shipping Administration.
4 October	George W. Lively	Liberty ship	Todd Houston Shipbuilding Corporation	Houston, Texas	United States	For War Shipping Administration.
4 October	Oscar S. Straus	Liberty ship	Delta Shipbuilding	New Orleans, Louisiana	United States	For War Shipping Administration.
4 October	William I. Sublette	Liberty ship	Oregon Shipbuilding Corporation	Portland, Oregon	United States	For War Shipping Administration.
4 October	W. R. Grace	Liberty ship	Bethlehem Fairfield Shipyard	Baltimore, Maryland	United States	For War Shipping Administration.
5 October	Cyrus T. Brady	Liberty ship	Permanente Metals Corporation	Richmond, California	United States	For War Shipping Administration.
5 October	Thomas Clyde	Liberty ship	New England Shipbuilding Corporation	South Portland, Maine	United States	For War Shipping Administration.
5 October	William S. Clark	Liberty ship	Permanente Metals Corporation	Richmond, California	United States	For War Shipping Administration.
6 October	Adolph Lewisohn	Liberty ship	Bethlehem Fairfield Shipyard	Baltimore, Maryland	United States	Completed as Samota for Ministry of War Transport.
6 October	Nassuk Bay	Casablanca-class escort carrier	Kaiser Shipyards	Vancouver, Washington	United States	Converted S4 merchant hull; Transferred to USN before commissioning as USS Solomons
6 October	Samuel S. Williston	Liberty ship	Permanente Metals Corporation	Richmond, California	United States	For War Shipping Administration.
6 October	Spiteful	S3-class submarine			United Kingdom	
6 October	Thomas W. Gregory	Liberty ship	Todd Houston Shipbuilding Corporation	Houston, Texas	United States	For War Shipping Administration.
6 October	TID 48	TID-class tug	Richard Dunston Ltd.	Thorne	United Kingdom	For the War Department.
6 October	William H. Ashley	Liberty ship	Oregon Shipbuilding Corporation	Portland, Oregon	United States	For War Shipping Administration.
7 October	Horace H. Lurton	Liberty ship	J. A. Jones Construction Co.	Brunswick, Georgia	United States	For War Shipping Administration.
7 October	Mission San Jose	T2 tanker	Marinship Corporation	Sausalito, California	United States	For United States Maritime Commission.
8 October	Edgar W. Nye	Liberty ship	Permanente Metals Corporation	Richmond, California	United States	For War Shipping Administration.
8 October	Edward Cook	Liberty ship	Bethlehem Fairfield Shipyard	Baltimore, Maryland	United States	Completed as Samwis for Ministry of War Transport.
8 October	W. W. McCrackin	Liberty ship	Oregon Shipbuilding Corporation	Portland, Oregon	United States	For War Shipping Administration.
9 October	Eliza Jane Nicholson	Liberty ship	Delta Shipbuilding	New Orleans, Louisiana	United States	For War Shipping Administration.
9 October	Francis N. Blanchet	Liberty ship	Oregon Shipbuilding Corporation	Portland, Oregon	United States	For War Shipping Administration.
9 October	Frank C. Emerson	Liberty ship	Permanente Metals Corporation	Richmond, California	United States	For War Shipping Administration.
9 October	Geologist	Cargo ship	Lithgows Ltd.	Port Glasgow	United Kingdom	For Charente Steamship Co. Ltd.
9 October	Samuel Brannon	Liberty ship	Permanente Metals Corporation	Richmond, California	United States	For War Shipping Administration.
9 October	Simon B. Elliott	Liberty ship	Bethlehem Fairfield Shipyard	Baltimore, Maryland	United States	Completed as Samnesse for Ministry of War Transport.
10 October	General Hoyt S. Vandenberg	General G. O. Squier-class transport ship	Kaiser Co., Inc.	Richmond, California	United States	For United States Navy
10 October	John Fairfield	Liberty ship	New England Shipbuilding Corporation	South Portland, Maine	United States	For War Shipping Administration.
10 October	Lyon G. Tyler	Liberty ship	Bethlehem Fairfield Shipyard	Baltimore, Maryland	United States	Completed as Samnebra for Ministry of War Transport.
10 October	Robert L. Vann	Liberty ship	New England Shipbuilding Corporation	South Portland, Maine	United States	For War Shipping Administration.
10 October	Sumner J. Kimball	Liberty ship	New England Shipbuilding Corporation	South Portland, Maine	United States	For War Shipping Administration.
10 October	Tomahawk	T2 tanker	Marinship Corporation	Sausalito, California	United States	For United States Maritime Commission.
11 October	Charles F. Amidon	Liberty ship	Oregon Shipbuilding Corporation	Portland, Oregon	United States	For War Shipping Administration.
11 October	Empire Lord	Cargo ship	William Doxford & Sons Ltd.	Pallion	United Kingdom	For Ministry of War Transport.
11 October	Empire Settler	Coastal tanker	Grangemouth Dockyard Co Ltd	Grangemouth	United Kingdom	For Ministry of War Transport
11 October	George M. Shriver	Liberty ship	Bethlehem Fairfield Shipyard	Baltimore, Maryland	United States	For War Shipping Administration.
11 October	John W. Foster	Liberty ship	Permanente Metals Corporation	Richmond, California	United States	For War Shipping Administration.
11 October	Will R. Wood	Liberty ship	Todd Houston Shipbuilding Corporation	Houston, Texas	United States	For War Shipping Administration.
12 October	Chief Charlot	Liberty ship	Permanente Metals Corporation	Richmond, California	United States	For War Shipping Administration.
12 October	Empire MacCallum	MAC ship	Lithgows Ltd.	Port Glasgow	United Kingdom	For Ministry of War Transport.
12 October	Enoch Train	Liberty ship	New England Shipbuilding Corporation	South Portland, Maine	United States	For War Shipping Administration.
12 October	Joseph Habersham	Liberty ship	Southeastern Shipbuilding Corporation	Savannah, Georgia	United States	For War Shipping Administration.
12 October	Red Canyon	T2 Tanker	Alabama Drydock and Shipbuilding Company	Mobile, Alabama	United States	For War Shipping Administration.
12 October	Stage Door Canteen	Liberty ship	Bethlehem Fairfield Shipyard	Baltimore, Maryland	United States	For War Shipping Administration.
12 October	TID 49	TID-class tug	Richard Dunston Ltd.	Thorne	United Kingdom	For the War Department.
13 October	Joseph M. Carey	Liberty ship	Oregon Shipbuilding Corporation	Portland, Oregon	United States	For War Shipping Administration.
13 October	Norman Hapgood	Liberty ship	Permanente Metals Corporation	Richmond, California	United States	For War Shipping Administration.
14 October	Bernard O'Higgins	Liberty ship	Permanente Metals Corporation	Richmond, California	United States	For War Shipping Administration.
14 October	Cape Argos	Type C1 ship	Consolidated Steel Corporation	Wilmington, CA	United States	For United States Maritime Commission
14 October	Empire Boxer	Coastal tanker	Rowhedge Ironworks Ltd	Rowhedge	United Kingdom	For Ministry of War Transport
14 October	Empire Chuzzlewit	Coaster	Richardsons Ironworks Ltd.	Lowestoft	United Kingdom	For Ministry of War Transport. Completed as RFA Chattenden for the Royal Fleet Auxiliary.
14 October	Franklin	Essex-class aircraft carrier	Newport News Shipbuilding	Newport News, VA	United States	
14 October	Grant Wood	Liberty ship	St. Johns River Shipbuilding Company	Jacksonville, Florida	United States	For War Shipping Administration.
14 October	Mission San Juan	T2 tanker	Marinship Corporation	Sausalito, California	United States	For United States Maritime Commission.
14 October	Norrisia	Tanker	Harland & Wolff Ltd.	Belfast	United Kingdom	For Anglo-Saxon Petroleum Co. Ltd.
14 October	Prospector	Cargo ship	Lithgows Ltd.	Port Glasgow	United Kingdom	For Charente Steamship Co. Ltd.
14 October	Silveroak	Cargo ship	J. L. Thompson & Sons Ltd.	Sunderland	United Kingdom	For Silver Line Ltd.
15 October	Casper S. Yost	Liberty ship	Permanente Metals Corporation	Richmond, California	United States	For War Shipping Administration.
15 October	Kalinin Bay	Casablanca-class escort carrier	Kaiser Shipyards	Vancouver, Washington	United States	Converted S4 merchant hull
15 October	Lewis Emery Jr.	Liberty ship	Bethlehem Fairfield Shipyard	Baltimore, Maryland	United States	For War Shipping Administration.
15 October	Thomas F. Cunningham	Liberty ship	Delta Shipbuilding	New Orleans, Louisiana	United States	For War Shipping Administration.
15 October	Watson C. Squire	Liberty ship	Oregon Shipbuilding Corporation	Portland, Oregon	United States	For War Shipping Administration.
15 October	William M. Rayburn	Liberty ship	Todd Houston Shipbuilding Corporation	Houston, Texas	United States	For War Shipping Administration.
16 October	Cerium	Coaster	Goole Shipbuilding & Repairing Co. Ltd.	Goole	United Kingdom	For ICI (Alkali) Ltd.
16 October	Empire Crown	Cargo ship	John Readhead & Sons	Sunderland	United Kingdom	For Ministry of War Transport
16 October	Harold L. Winslow	Liberty ship	Bethlehem Fairfield Shipyard	Baltimore, Maryland	United States	For War Shipping Administration.
16 October	Norman E. Mack	Liberty ship	Permanente Metals Corporation	Richmond, California	United States	For War Shipping Administration.
16 October	Stephen G. Porter	Liberty ship	Oregon Shipbuilding Corporation	Portland, Oregon	United States	For War Shipping Administration.
17 October	Edith Wharton	Liberty ship	Bethlehem Fairfield Shipyard	Baltimore, Maryland	United States	Completed as Samvern for Ministry of War Transport.
17 October	Henry H. Blood	Liberty ship	Permanente Metals Corporation	Richmond, California	United States	For War Shipping Administration.
17 October	J. Whitridge Williams	Liberty ship	Bethlehem Fairfield Shipyard	Baltimore, Maryland	United States	Completed as Samsylvan for Ministry of War Transport.
17 October	Mary Ball	Liberty ship	J. A. Jones Construction Company	Panama City, Florida	United States	For War Shipping Administration.
18 October	Abbot L. Mills	Liberty ship	Oregon Shipbuilding Corporation	Portland, Oregon	United States	For War Shipping Administration.
18 October	Albert G. Brown	Liberty ship	Delta Shipbuilding	New Orleans, Louisiana	United States	For War Shipping Administration.
18 October	Francis P. Duffey	Liberty ship	Bethlehem Fairfield Shipyard	Baltimore, Maryland	United States	For War Shipping Administration.
18 October	Joseph H. Martin	Liberty ship	Southeastern Shipbuilding Corporation	Savannah, Georgia	United States	For War Shipping Administration.
18 October	Neocardia	Tanker	Blythswood Shipbuilding Co. Ltd.	Glasgow	United Kingdom	For Anglo-Saxon Petroleum Co. Ltd.
18 October	TID 50	TID-class tug	Richard Dunston Ltd.	Thorne	United Kingdom	For the Admiralty.
18 October	William J. Palmer	Liberty ship	Permanente Metals Corporation	Richmond, California	United States	For War Shipping Administration.
19 October	John Swatt	Liberty ship	Permanente Metals Corporation	Richmond, California	United States	For War Shipping Administration.
19 October	L. H. McNelly	Liberty ship	Todd Houston Shipbuilding Corporation	Houston, Texas	United States	For War Shipping Administration.
19 October	William Blackstone	Liberty ship	New England Shipbuilding Corporation	South Portland, Maine	United States	For War Shipping Administration.
19 October	W. Walter Husband	Liberty ship	Bethlehem Fairfield Shipyard	Baltimore, Maryland	United States	Completed as Samyork for Ministry of War Transport.
20 October	Albert A. Michelson	Liberty ship	Oregon Shipbuilding Corporation	Portland, Oregon	United States	For War Shipping Administration.
20 October	Brünhilde	Hansa A Type cargo ship	C. Van der Giessen & Zonen's Scheepswerfen NV	Krimpen aan den IJssel	Netherlands	For Hamburg-Südamerikanische Dampfschifffahrts-Gesellschaft
21 October	Äolus	Hansa A Type cargo ship	J Cockerill SA	Hoboken	Belgium	For Dampfschifffahrts Gesellschaft Neptun
21 October	George Popham	Liberty ship	New England Shipbuilding Corporation	South Portland, Maine	United States	For War Shipping Administration.
21 October	Omar E. Chapman	Liberty ship	New England Shipbuilding Corporation	South Portland, Maine	United States	For War Shipping Administration.
21 October	U. S. O.	Liberty ship	Bethlehem Fairfield Shipyard	Baltimore, Maryland	United States	For War Shipping Administration.
21 October	Vernon L. Parrington	Liberty ship	Permanente Metals Corporation	Richmond, California	United States	For War Shipping Administration.
22 October	Edmund G. Ross	Liberty ship	Oregon Shipbuilding Corporation	Portland, Oregon	United States	For War Shipping Administration.
22 October	George K. Fitch	Liberty ship	Permanente Metals Corporation	Richmond, California	United States	For War Shipping Administration.
22 October	Henry W. Grady	Liberty ship	J. A. Jones Construction Co.	Brunswick, Georgia	United States	For War Shipping Administration.
22 October	Peter Cooper Hewitt	Liberty ship	Permanente Metals Corporation	Richmond, California	United States	For War Shipping Administration.
23 October	Edward M. House	Liberty ship	St. Johns River Shipbuilding Company	Jacksonville, Florida	United States	For War Shipping Administration.
23 October	John Barton Payne	Liberty ship	J. A. Jones Construction Company	Panama City, Florida	United States	For War Shipping Administration.
23 October	Jose Artigas	Liberty ship	Bethlehem Fairfield Shipyard	Baltimore, Maryland	United States	Completed as Samokla for Ministry of War Transport.
23 October	Lucien B. Maxwell	Liberty ship	Todd Houston Shipbuilding Corporation	Houston, Texas	United States	For War Shipping Administration.
23 October	Peter White	Liberty ship	Oregon Shipbuilding Corporation	Portland, Oregon	United States	For War Shipping Administration.
24 October	Francis A. Wardwell	Liberty ship	Permanente Metals Corporation	Richmond, California	United States	For War Shipping Administration.
24 October	Kasaan Bay	Casablanca-class escort carrier	Kaiser Shipyards	Vancouver, Washington	United States	Converted S4 merchant hull
25 October	Ethan A. Hitchcock	Liberty ship	Permanente Metals Corporation	Richmond, California	United States	For War Shipping Administration.
25 October	J. Warren Keifer	Liberty ship	Oregon Shipbuilding Corporation	Portland, Oregon	United States	For War Shipping Administration.
25 October	Kate Douglas Wiggin	Liberty ship	Permanente Metals Corporation	Richmond, California	United States	For War Shipping Administration.
26 October	Priscilla Alden	Liberty ship	Bethlehem Fairfield Shipyard	Baltimore, Maryland	United States	Completed as Samlouis for Ministry of War Transport.
25 October	TID 51	TID-class tug	Richard Dunston Ltd.	Thorne	United Kingdom	For the Ministry of War Transport.
26 October	Recruit	Algerine-class minesweeper	Harland & Wolff	Belfast	United Kingdom	For Royal Navy.
27 October	David Hewes	Liberty ship	Permanente Metals Corporation	Richmond, California	United States	For War Shipping Administration.
27 October	Mary Bickerdyke	Liberty ship	Permanente Metals Corporation	Richmond, California	United States	For War Shipping Administration.
27 October	William H. Dall	Liberty ship	Oregon Shipbuilding Corporation	Portland, Oregon	United States	For War Shipping Administration.
28 October	Albert S. Burleson	Liberty ship	Todd Houston Shipbuilding Corporation	Houston, Texas	United States	For War Shipping Administration.
28 October	Empire Russell	Intermediate type tanker	Sir J. Laing & Sons Ltd.	Sunderland	United Kingdom	For Ministry of War Transport.
28 October	Ferdinand A. Silcox	Liberty ship	Permanente Metals Corporation	Richmond, California	United States	For War Shipping Administration.
28 October	Robert Fechner	Liberty ship	Southeastern Shipbuilding Corporation	Savannah, Georgia	United States	For War Shipping Administration.
29 October	Empire Stuart	Cargo ship	Short Brothers Ltd.	Sunderland	United Kingdom	For Ministry of War Transport.
29 October	Empire Unicorn	Cargo ship	William Gray & Co. Ltd.	West Hartlepool	United Kingdom	For Ministry of War Transport.
29 October	James H. Lane	Liberty ship	Oregon Shipbuilding Corporation	Portland, Oregon	United States	For War Shipping Administration.
29 October	Sappa Creek	T2 Tanker	Alabama Drydock and Shipbuilding Company	Mobile, Alabama	United States	For War Shipping Administration.
29 October	Theodore Roosevelt	Liberty ship	Bethlehem Fairfield Shipyard	Baltimore, Maryland	United States	For War Shipping Administration.
29 October	William W. Campbell	Liberty ship	Permanente Metals Corporation	Richmond, California	United States	For War Shipping Administration.
30 October	Charles A. Wickliffe	Liberty ship	Delta Shipbuilding	New Orleans, Louisiana	United States	For War Shipping Administration.
30 October	Empire Harcourt	Scandinavian type cargo ship	William Gray & Co. Ltd.	West Hartlepool	United Kingdom	For Ministry of War Transport.
30 October	Fort Laramie	T2 Tanker	Alabama Drydock and Shipbuilding Company	Mobile, Alabama	United States	For War Shipping Administration.
30 October	Frederic C. Howe	Liberty ship	J. A. Jones Construction Company	Panama City, Florida	United States	For War Shipping Administration.
30 October	Hishi Maru No 3	Tanker	Mitsubishi Shipyard	Shimonoseki	Japan	For Mitsubishi Kisen KK
30 October	James A. Whetmore	Liberty ship	J. A. Jones Construction Co.	Brunswick, Georgia	United States	For War Shipping Administration.
30 October	Michael C. Kerr	Liberty ship	Permanente Metals Corporation	Richmond, California	United States	For War Shipping Administration.
30 October	Parkes	Bathurst-class corvette	Evans Deakin & Co	Brisbane	Australia	
30 October	Sara Teasdale	Liberty ship	Permanente Metals Corporation	Richmond, California	United States	For War Shipping Administration.
30 October	TID 46	TID-class tug	Richard Dunston Ltd.	Thorne	United Kingdom	For the Admiralty.
30 October	William D. Hoard	Liberty ship	Oregon Shipbuilding Corporation	Portland, Oregon	United States	For War Shipping Administration.
31 October	Abiqua	T2 Tanker	Alabama Drydock and Shipbuilding Company	Mobile, Alabama	United States	For War Shipping Administration.
31 October	Empire Belle	Modified Warrior-type tug	John Crown & Sons Ltd	Sunderland	United Kingdom	For Ministry of War Transport.
31 October	Harvey Cushing	Liberty ship	St. Johns River Shipbuilding Company	Jacksonville, Florida	United States	For War Shipping Administration.
31 October	James King	Liberty ship	Permanente Metals Corporation	Richmond, California	United States	For War Shipping Administration.
31 October	Jean Baptiste Le Moyne	Liberty ship	Delta Shipbuilding	New Orleans, Louisiana	United States	For War Shipping Administration.
31 October	Jeremiah L. Chaplin	Liberty ship	New England Shipbuilding Corporation	South Portland, Maine	United States	For War Shipping Administration.
31 October	Mission San Miguel	T2 tanker	Marinship Corporation	Sausalito, California	United States	For United States Maritime Commission.
31 October	Samuel M. Ralston	Liberty ship	Bethlehem Fairfield Shipyard	Baltimore, Maryland	United States	Completed as Samois for Ministry of War Transport.
October	Sesame	Assurance-class tug	Cochrane & Sons Ltd.	Selby	United Kingdom	For the Admiralty.

== November ==
Date	Ship	Class	Builder	Location	Country	Notes
1 November	Edwin A. Robinson	Liberty ship	Bethlehem Fairfield Shipyard	Baltimore, Maryland	United States	Completed as Samsip for Ministry of War Transport.
1 November	Empire Charles	Near-Warrior type tug	Henry Scarr Ltd.	Hessle	United Kingdom	For Ministry of War Transport.
1 November	Fanshaw Bay	Casablanca-class escort carrier	Kaiser Shipyards	Vancouver, Washington	United States	Converted S4 merchant hull
1 November	Francis W. Parker	Liberty ship	Oregon Shipbuilding Corporation	Portland, Oregon	United States	For War Shipping Administration.
1 November	Mission San Fernando	T2 tanker	Marinship Corporation	Sausalito, California	United States	For United States Maritime Commission.
2 November	R. F. Peckham	Liberty ship	Permanente Metals Corporation	Richmond, California	United States	For War Shipping Administration.
2 November	San Vito	Tanker	Harland & Wolff Ltd.	Govan	United Kingdom	For Eagle Oil & Shipping Co. Ltd.
3 November	Horace V. White	Liberty ship	Oregon Shipbuilding Corporation	Portland, Oregon	United States	For War Shipping Administration.
4 November	Peter Trumble Rowe	Liberty ship	Permanente Metals Corporation	Richmond, California	United States	For War Shipping Administration.
5 November	Augustine Herman	Liberty ship	Bethlehem Fairfield Shipyard	Baltimore, Maryland	United States	Completed as Samsette for Ministry of War Transport.
5 November	Barrett Wendell	Liberty ship	New England Shipbuilding Corporation	South Portland, Maine	United States	For War Shipping Administration.
5 November	Charles C. Jones	Liberty ship	Southeastern Shipbuilding Corporation	Savannah, Georgia	United States	For War Shipping Administration.
5 November	Elisha P. Ferry	Liberty ship	Oregon Shipbuilding Corporation	Portland, Oregon	United States	For War Shipping Administration.
5 November	Keith Vawter	Liberty ship	Permanente Metals Corporation	Richmond, California	United States	For War Shipping Administration.
5 November	William Pitt Preble	Liberty ship	New England Shipbuilding Corporation	South Portland, Maine	United States	For War Shipping Administration.
6 November	Charles Scribner	Liberty ship	Bethlehem Fairfield Shipyard	Baltimore, Maryland	United States	For War Shipping Administration.
6 November	Joseph H. Kibbey	Liberty ship	Todd Houston Shipbuilding Corporation	Houston, Texas	United States	For War Shipping Administration.
6 November	Lucius Fairchild	Liberty ship	Oregon Shipbuilding Corporation	Portland, Oregon	United States	For War Shipping Administration.
6 November	Paul Tulane	Liberty ship	Delta Shipbuilding	New Orleans, Louisiana	United States	For War Shipping Administration.
6 November	William B. Wilson	Liberty ship	J. A. Jones Construction Company	Panama City, Florida	United States	For War Shipping Administration.
7 November	Cape Girardeau	Type C1-S-Ay-1 cargo ship	Consolidated Steel Corporation	Wilmington, California	United States	For War Shipping Administration
7 November	Elias H. Derby	Liberty ship	New England Shipbuilding Corporation	South Portland, Maine	United States	For War Shipping Administration.
7 November	James G. Maguire	Liberty ship	Permanente Metals Corporation	Richmond, California	United States	For War Shipping Administration.
8 November	Edward Bruce	Liberty ship	Bethlehem Fairfield Shipyard	Baltimore, Maryland	United States	Completed as Samoine for Ministry of War Transport.
8 November	Jane G. Swissheim	Liberty ship	Oregon Shipbuilding Corporation	Portland, Oregon	United States	For War Shipping Administration.
8 November	Kitkun Bay	Casablanca-class escort carrier	Kaiser Shipyards	Vancouver, Washington	United States	Converted S4 merchant hull
8 November	Willapa	Bogue-class escort carrier	Seattle-Tacoma Shipbuilding Company	Tacoma, Washington	United States	Converted C3 merchant freighter for Lend-Lease as HMS Puncher
8 November	William G. Sumner	Liberty ship	St. Johns River Shipbuilding Company	Jacksonville, Florida	United States	For War Shipping Administration.
9 November	Frederick Bartholdi	Liberty ship	J. A. Jones Construction Co.	Brunswick, Georgia	United States	For War Shipping Administration.
9 November	Israel J. Merritt	Liberty ship	Bethlehem Fairfield Shipyard	Baltimore, Maryland	United States	Completed as Samflora for Ministry of War Transport.
9 November	Robert Louis Stevenson	Liberty ship	Permanente Metals Corporation	Richmond, California	United States	For War Shipping Administration.
9 November	TID 52	TID-class tug	Richard Dunston Ltd.	Thorne	United Kingdom	For the Admiralty.
10 November	Clan MacDougall	Cargo ship	Greenock Dockyard Co. Ltd.	Greenock	United Kingdom	For the Clan Line Steamers Ltd.
10 November	Duddon	River-class minesweeper	Blyth Dry Docks & Shipbuilding Co. Ltd	Blyth, Northumberland	United Kingdom	For Royal Navy.
10 November	Empire Harvest	Coastal tanker	A & J Inglis Ltd	Glasgow	United Kingdom	For Ministry of War Transport
10 November	Empire Lilliput	Maple-type tug	Richard Dunston Ltd.	Thorne	United Kingdom	For Ministry of War Transport.
10 November	Francisco M. Quinones	Liberty ship	Permanente Metals Corporation	Richmond, California	United States	For War Shipping Administration.
10 November	Henry T. Rainey	Liberty ship	Oregon Shipbuilding Corporation	Portland, Oregon	United States	For War Shipping Administration.
10 November	Horace H. Harvey	Liberty ship	Delta Shipbuilding	New Orleans, Louisiana	United States	For War Shipping Administration.
10 November	Oscar Chappell	Liberty ship	Todd Houston Shipbuilding Corporation	Houston, Texas	United States	For War Shipping Administration.
10 November	San Velino	Tanker	R. & W. Hawthorn, Leslie and Co. Ltd.	Newcastle on Tyne	United Kingdom	For Eagle Oil & Shipping Co. Ltd.
11 November	Derrycunihy	Cargo ship	Burntisland Shipbuilding Company	Burntisland	United Kingdom	For McCowan & Gross Ltd.
11 November	Empire Canyon	Cargo ship	Caledon Shipbuilding & Engineering Co Ltd	Dundee	United Kingdom	For Ministry of War Transport
11 November	Empire General	Cargo ship	William Doxford & Sons Ltd.	Pallion	United Kingdom	For Ministry of War Transport.
11 November	Empire Welfare	Cargo ship	J. L. Thompson & Sons Ltd.	Sunderland	United Kingdom	For Ministry of War Transport.
11 November	Florence Martus	Liberty ship	Southeastern Shipbuilding Corporation	Savannah, Georgia	United States	For War Shipping Administration.
11 November	Harry Leon Wilson	Liberty ship	Permanente Metals Corporation	Richmond, California	United States	For War Shipping Administration.
11 November	Mermaid	Black Swan-class sloop			United Kingdom	
11 November	Ralph A. Cram	Liberty ship	California Shipbuilding Corporation	Los Angeles, California	United States	For War Shipping Administration.
11 November	Trevanion	Cargo ship	Lithgows Ltd.	Port Glasgow	United Kingdom	For Hain Steamship Co. Ltd.
12 November	Ferdinand Westdahl	Liberty ship	Permanente Metals Corporation	Richmond, California	United States	For War Shipping Administration.
12 November	Guam	Alaska-class large cruiser	New York Shipbuilding Corporation	Camden, NJ	United States	
12 November	John La Farge	Liberty ship	Bethlehem Fairfield Shipyard	Baltimore, Maryland	United States	For War Shipping Administration.
12 November	Thomas Crawford	Liberty ship	Oregon Shipbuilding Corporation	Portland, Oregon	United States	For War Shipping Administration.
13 November	Empire Noble	Cargo ship	Vickers-Armstrongs Ltd.	Barrow in Furness	United Kingdom	For Ministry of War Transport.
13 November	Frank A. Vanderlip	Liberty ship	Bethlehem Fairfield Shipyard	Baltimore, Maryland	United States	Completed as Sambuff for Ministry of War Transport.
13 November	George P. McKay	Liberty ship	Oregon Shipbuilding Corporation	Portland, Oregon	United States	For War Shipping Administration.
13 November	John A. Roebling	Liberty ship	California Shipbuilding Corporation	Los Angeles, California	United States	For War Shipping Administration.
13 November	John W. Meldrum	Liberty ship	Permanente Metals Corporation	Richmond, California	United States	For War Shipping Administration.
13 November	J. S. Cullinan	Liberty ship	Todd Houston Shipbuilding Corporation	Houston, Texas	United States	For War Shipping Administration.
13 November	Mary Wilkins Freeman	Liberty ship	New England Shipbuilding Corporation	South Portland, Maine	United States	For War Shipping Administration.
13 November	Nathan B. Forrest	Liberty ship	J. A. Jones Construction Company	Panama City, Florida	United States	For War Shipping Administration.
13 November	Sweetwater	T2 Tanker	Alabama Drydock and Shipbuilding Company	Mobile, Alabama	United States	For War Shipping Administration.
13 November	William F. Empey	Liberty ship	Permanente Metals Corporation	Richmond, California	United States	For War Shipping Administration.
14 November	Jacob H. Schiff	Liberty ship	Bethlehem Fairfield Shipyard	Baltimore, Maryland	United States	Completed as Samburgh for Ministry of War Transport.
14 November	Nassarius	Tanker	Harland & Wolff Ltd.	Belfast	United Kingdom	For Anglo-Saxon Petroleum Co. Ltd.
15 November	John T. Clark	Liberty ship	Bethlehem Fairfield Shipyard	Baltimore, Maryland	United States	Completed as Samcleve for Ministry of War Transport.
15 November	Tulagi	Casablanca-class escort carrier	Kaiser Shipyards	Vancouver, Washington	United States	Converted S4 merchant hull
15 November	Cape St. Vincent	Infantry Landing Ship	Consolidated Steel Corporation	Wilmington, California	United States	
15 November	John L. Stoddard	Liberty ship	Permanente Metals Corporation	Richmond, California	United States	For War Shipping Administration.
15 November	Richard J. Oglesby	Liberty ship	Oregon Shipbuilding Corporation	Portland, Oregon	United States	For War Shipping Administration.
15 November	William B. Bankhead	Liberty ship	Delta Shipbuilding	New Orleans, Louisiana	United States	For War Shipping Administration.
16 November	Clyde L. Seavey	Liberty ship	Permanente Metals Corporation	Richmond, California	United States	For War Shipping Administration.
16 November	Frank H. Dodd	Liberty ship	Permanente Metals Corporation	Richmond, California	United States	For War Shipping Administration.
16 November	James Carroll	Liberty ship	Bethlehem Fairfield Shipyard	Baltimore, Maryland	United States	Completed as Samgara for Ministry of War Transport.
16 November	John B. Gordon	Liberty ship	J. A. Jones Construction Co.	Brunswick, Georgia	United States	For War Shipping Administration.
16 November	Junee	Bathurst-class corvette	Poole & Steel Limited	Balmain, New South Wales	Australia	
16 November	Orland Loomis	Liberty ship	California Shipbuilding Corporation	Los Angeles, California	United States	For War Shipping Administration.
16 November	Peter Stuyvesant	Liberty ship	St. Johns River Shipbuilding Company	Jacksonville, Florida		For War Shipping Administration.
16 November	TID 53	TID-class tug	Richard Dunston Ltd.	Thorne	United Kingdom	For the War Department.
17 November	Charles H. Herty	Liberty ship	Southeastern Shipbuilding Corporation	Savannah, Georgia	United States	For War Shipping Administration.
17 November	Empire Camp	Refrigerated cargo ship	Short Brothers Ltd.	Sunderland	United Kingdom	For Ministry of War Transport
17 November	John Ball	Liberty ship	Oregon Shipbuilding Corporation	Portland, Oregon	United States	For War Shipping Administration.
18 November	Francis C. Harrington	Liberty ship	Bethlehem Fairfield Shipyard	Baltimore, Maryland	United States	For War Shipping Administration.
18 November	Hugh Young	Liberty ship	Todd Houston Shipbuilding Corporation	Houston, Texas	United States	For War Shipping Administration.
18 November	Mary Walker	Liberty ship	Permanente Metals Corporation	Richmond, California	United States	For War Shipping Administration.
19 November	Barbara Frietchie	Liberty ship	Bethlehem Fairfield Shipyard	Baltimore, Maryland	United States	For War Shipping Administration.
19 November	J. Maurice Thompson	Liberty ship	Permanente Metals Corporation	Richmond, California	United States	For War Shipping Administration.
19 November	Segundo Ruiz Belvis	Liberty ship	Oregon Shipbuilding Corporation	Portland, Oregon	United States	For War Shipping Administration.
19 November	William A. Coulter	Liberty ship	Permanente Metals Corporation	Richmond, California	United States	For War Shipping Administration.
20 November	Daniel Appleton	Liberty ship	Bethlehem Fairfield Shipyard	Baltimore, Maryland	United States	Completed as Samfield for Ministry of War Transport.
20 November	Frank B. Lindermman	Liberty ship	Oregon Shipbuilding Corporation	Portland, Oregon	United States	For War Shipping Administration.
20 November	Matthew J. O'Brien	Liberty ship	Todd Houston Shipbuilding Corporation	Houston, Texas	United States	For War Shipping Administration.
20 November	Safeguard	Diver-class rescue and salvage ship	Basalt Rock Company	Napa, California	United States	
20 November	Weserwald	Hansa A Type cargo ship	Deutsche Werft	Hamburg	Germany	For Norddeutscher Lloyd
21 November	J. Willard Gibbs	Liberty ship	New England Shipbuilding Corporation	South Portland, Maine	United States	For War Shipping Administration.
21 November	Leo J. Duster	Liberty ship	Bethlehem Fairfield Shipyard	Baltimore, Maryland	United States	For War Shipping Administration.
21 November	Walter Williams	Liberty ship	Permanente Metals Corporation	Richmond, California	United States	For War Shipping Administration.
22 November	Edward Paine	Liberty ship	California Shipbuilding Corporation	Los Angeles, California	United States	For War Shipping Administration.
22 November	Gambier Bay	Casablanca-class escort carrier	Kaiser Shipyards	Vancouver, Washington	United States	Converted S4 merchant hull
22 November	John B. Kendrick	Liberty ship	Oregon Shipbuilding Corporation	Portland, Oregon	United States	For War Shipping Administration.
22 November	Mary A. Livermore	Liberty ship	Permanente Metals Corporation	Richmond, California	United States	For War Shipping Administration.
22 November	Winjah	Bogue-class escort carrier	Seattle-Tacoma Shipyard	Tacoma, Washington	United States	Converted C3 merchant freighter for Lend-Lease as HMS Reaper
23 November	Edward P. Alexander	Liberty ship	J. A. Jones Construction Co.	Brunswick, Georgia	United States	For War Shipping Administration.
23 November	James Screven	Liberty ship	St. Johns River Shipbuilding Company	Jacksonville, Florida	United States	For War Shipping Administration.
23 November	John F. Goucher	Liberty ship	Bethlehem Fairfield Shipyard	Baltimore, Maryland	United States	For War Shipping Administration.
23 November	Louis Pasteur	Liberty ship	Permanente Metals Corporation	Richmond, California	United States	For War Shipping Administration.
23 November	Sylester Pattie	Liberty ship	California Shipbuilding Corporation	Los Angeles, California	United States	For War Shipping Administration.
23 November	TID 54	TID-class tug	Richard Dunston Ltd.	Thorne	United Kingdom	For the Admiralty.
24 November	Mercy Warren	Liberty ship	New England Shipbuilding Corporation	South Portland, Maine	United States	For War Shipping Administration.
24 November	Percy D. Haughton	Liberty ship	New England Shipbuilding Corporation	South Portland, Maine	United States	For War Shipping Administration.
24 November	Robert R. Randall	Liberty ship	New England Shipbuilding Corporation	South Portland, Maine	United States	For War Shipping Administration.
24 November	Simeon G. Reed	Liberty ship	Oregon Shipbuilding Corporation	Portland, Oregon	United States	For War Shipping Administration.
24 November	Sarah J. Hale	Liberty ship	J. A. Jones Construction Company	Panama City, Florida	United States	For War Shipping Administration.
24 November	Seaman A. Knapp	Liberty ship	Permanente Metals Corporation	Richmond, California	United States	For War Shipping Administration.
24 November	Willis J. Abbott	Liberty ship	Bethlehem Fairfield Shipyard	Baltimore, Maryland	United States	Completed as Samboston for Ministry of War Transport.
25 November	James C. Cameron	Liberty ship	Bethlehem Fairfield Shipyard	Baltimore, Maryland	United States	For War Shipping Administration.
25 November	John E. Ward	Liberty ship	Southeastern Shipbuilding Corporation	Savannah, Georgia	United States	For War Shipping Administration.
25 November	Leopold Damrosch	Liberty ship	California Shipbuilding Corporation	Los Angeles, California	United States	For War Shipping Administration.
25 November	Rifleman	Algerine-class minesweeper	Harland & Wolff	Belfast	United Kingdom	For Royal Navy.
26 November	Henry Austin	Liberty ship	Todd Houston Shipbuilding Corporation	Houston, Texas	United States	For War Shipping Administration.
26 November	Hugh M. Smith	Liberty ship	Bethlehem Fairfield Shipyard	Baltimore, Maryland	United States	For War Shipping Administration.
26 November	James Rolph	Liberty ship	Permanente Metals Corporation	Richmond, California	United States	For War Shipping Administration.
26 November	Lewis L. Dyche	Liberty ship	Oregon Shipbuilding Corporation	Portland, Oregon	United States	For War Shipping Administration.
26 November	Touchet	T2 Tanker	Alabama Drydock and Shipbuilding Company	Mobile, Alabama	United States	For War Shipping Administration.
26 November	William C. Ralston	Liberty ship	Permanente Metals Corporation	Richmond, California	United States	For War Shipping Administration.
27 November	Antonin Dvorak	Liberty ship	Permanente Metals Corporation	Richmond, California	United States	For War Shipping Administration.
27 November	Empire Aid	Larch-class tug	Clelands (Successors) Ltd.	Wallsend	United Kingdom	For the Admiralty.
27 November	Empire Andrew	Maple-type tug	Richard Dunston Ltd.	Thorne	United Kingdom	For Ministry of War Transport.
27 November	Empire Ann	Near-Warrior type tug	A. Hall & Co. Ltd.	Aberdeen	United Kingdom	For Ministry of War Transport.
27 November	Empire Law	Wave-class oiler	Furness Shipbuilding Co. Ltd.	Haverton Hill-on-Tees	United Kingdom	For Ministry of War Transport.
27 November	Empire Pym	Empire Pym type tanker	Grangemouth Dockyard Co. Ltd.	Grangemouth	United Kingdom	For Ministry of War Transport.
27 November	Glory	Colossus-class aircraft carrier	Harland & Wolff	Belfast	United Kingdom	For Royal Navy.
27 November	Henry Miller	Liberty ship	California Shipbuilding Corporation	Los Angeles, California	United States	For War Shipping Administration.
27 November	John Straub	Liberty ship	Oregon Shipbuilding Corporation	Portland, Oregon	United States	For War Shipping Administration.
27 November	Launceston Castle	Castle-class corvette	Blyth Dry Docks & Shipbuilding Co. Ltd	Blyth, Northumberland	United Kingdom	For Royal Navy.
27 November	Stephen R. Mallory	Liberty ship	J. A. Jones Construction Company	Panama City, Florida	United States	For War Shipping Administration.
27 November	TID 55	TID-class tug	Richard Dunston Ltd.	Thorne	United Kingdom	For the War Department.
28 November	James Manning	Liberty ship	New England Shipbuilding Corporation	South Portland, Maine	United States	For War Shipping Administration.
28 November	John Davey	Liberty ship	California Shipbuilding Corporation	Los Angeles, California	United States	For War Shipping Administration.
28 November	Nehenta Bay	Casablanca-class escort carrier	Kaiser Shipyards	Vancouver, Washington	United States	Converted S4 merchant hull
29 November	Albert A. Robinson	Liberty ship	Permanente Metals Corporation	Richmond, California	United States	For War Shipping Administration.
29 November	Lawrence Gianella	Liberty ship	Permanente Metals Corporation	Richmond, California	United States	For War Shipping Administration.
29 November	Loch Killin	Loch-class frigate	Burntisland Shipbuilding Company	Burntisland	United Kingdom	For Royal Navy.
29 November	Ross G. Marvin	Liberty ship	Bethlehem Fairfield Shipyard	Baltimore, Maryland	United States	Completed as Samtroy for Ministry of War Transport.
29 November	Wilbur O. Atwater	Liberty ship	Oregon Shipbuilding Corporation	Portland, Oregon	United States	For War Shipping Administration.
30 November	A. J. Cermak	Liberty ship	Bethlehem Fairfield Shipyard	Baltimore, Maryland	United States	For War Shipping Administration.
30 November	Cape Washington	Type C1-S-AY-1 cargo ship	Consolidated Steel Corporation	Wilmington, California	United States	For United States Maritime Commission
30 November	Charles Morgan	Liberty ship	Todd Houston Shipbuilding Corporation	Houston, Texas	United States	For War Shipping Administration.
30 November	Edwin L. Godkin	Liberty ship	Southeastern Shipbuilding Corporation	Savannah, Georgia	United States	For War Shipping Administration.
30 November	Evans Creek	T2 Tanker	Alabama Drydock and Shipbuilding Company	Mobile, Alabama	United States	For War Shipping Administration.
30 November	J. Fred Essary	Liberty ship	Bethlehem Fairfield Shipyard	Baltimore, Maryland	United States	For War Shipping Administration.
30 November	Napoleon B. Broward	Liberty ship	St. Johns River Shipbuilding Company	Jacksonville, Florida	United States	For War Shipping Administration.
30 November	Richard B. Moore	Liberty ship	Permanente Metals Corporation	Richmond, California	United States	For War Shipping Administration.
30 November	Robert Battey	Liberty ship	J. A. Jones Construction Co.	Brunswick, Georgia	United States	For War Shipping Administration.

== December ==
Date	Ship	Class	Builder	Location	Country	Notes
1 December	Isaac McCoy	Liberty ship	Oregon Shipbuilding Corporation	Portland, Oregon	United States	For War Shipping Administration.
2 December	Alexander Wilson	Liberty ship	Permanente Metals Corporation	Richmond, California	United States	For War Shipping Administration.
2 December	John W. Searles	Liberty ship	California Shipbuilding Corporation	Los Angeles, California	United States	For War Shipping Administration.
3 December	Ammla	Liberty ship	Bethlehem Fairfield Shipyard	Baltimore, Maryland	United States	Completed as Samvard for Ministry of War Transport.
3 December	Charles A. Young	Liberty ship	New England Shipbuilding Corporation	South Portland, Maine	United States	For War Shipping Administration.
3 December	John W. Davis	Liberty ship	Oregon Shipbuilding Corporation	Portland, Oregon	United States	For War Shipping Administration.
3 December	Opie Reed	Liberty ship	Delta Shipbuilding	New Orleans, Louisiana	United States	For War Shipping Administration.
4 December	Enos A. Mills	Liberty ship	Oregon Shipbuilding Corporation	Portland, Oregon	United States	For War Shipping Administration.
4 December	George H. Powell	Liberty ship	Permanente Metals Corporation	Richmond, California	United States	For War Shipping Administration.
4 December	Hoggatt Bay	Casablanca-class escort carrier	Kaiser Shipyards	Vancouver, Washington	United States	Converted S4 merchant hull
4 December	Louis Kossuth	Liberty ship	Bethlehem Fairfield Shipyard	Baltimore, Maryland	United States	For War Shipping Administration.
4 December	Meyer Lissner	Liberty ship	California Shipbuilding Corporation	Los Angeles, California	United States	For War Shipping Administration.
5 December	Jose C. Barbosa	Liberty ship	Permanente Metals Corporation	Richmond, California	United States	For War Shipping Administration.
5 December	Joshua B. Lippincott	Liberty ship	Bethlehem Fairfield Shipyard	Baltimore, Maryland	United States	For War Shipping Administration.
5 December	Judah Touro	Liberty ship	Delta Shipbuilding	New Orleans, Louisiana	United States	For War Shipping Administration.
6 December	Alexander Mitchell	Liberty ship	Permanente Metals Corporation	Richmond, California	United States	For War Shipping Administration.
6 December	Franklin H. King	Liberty ship	California Shipbuilding Corporation	Los Angeles, California	United States	For War Shipping Administration.
6 December	Grace R. Hebard	Liberty ship	Oregon Shipbuilding Corporation	Portland, Oregon	United States	For War Shipping Administration.
6 December	Israel Wheelen	Liberty ship	Bethlehem Fairfield Shipyard	Baltimore, Maryland	United States	Completed as Samport for Ministry of War Transport.
6 December	TID 56	TID-class tug	Richard Dunston Ltd.	Thorne	United Kingdom	For the United States Army.
7 December	A. Frank Lever	Liberty ship	Southeastern Shipbuilding Corporation	Savannah, Georgia	United States	For War Shipping Administration.
7 December	Arthur M. Huddell	Liberty ship	St. Johns River Shipbuilding Company	Jacksonville, Florida	United States	For War Shipping Administration.
7 December	George S. Wasson	Liberty ship	New England Shipbuilding Corporation	South Portland, Maine	United States	For War Shipping Administration.
7 December	Hugh L. Kerwin	Liberty ship	Bethlehem Fairfield Shipyard	Baltimore, Maryland	United States	Completed as Samyale for Ministry of War Transport.
7 December	J. C. Osgood	Liberty ship	Permanente Metals Corporation	Richmond, California	United States	For War Shipping Administration.
7 December	Walter L. Fleming	Liberty ship	J. A. Jones Construction Company	Panama City, Florida	United States	For War Shipping Administration.
7 December	Webb Miller	Liberty ship	New England Shipbuilding Corporation	South Portland, Maine	United States	For War Shipping Administration.
7 December	Wisconsin	Iowa-class battleship	Philadelphia Naval Shipyard	Philadelphia	United States	
8 December	Ben B. Lindsey	Liberty ship	California Shipbuilding Corporation	Los Angeles, California	United States	For War Shipping Administration.
8 December	Empire Earl	Cargo ship	William Doxford & Sons Ltd	Sunderland	United Kingdom	For Ministry of War Transport
8 December	Frank H. Evers	Liberty ship	Permanente Metals Corporation	Richmond, California	United States	For War Shipping Administration.
8 December	James B. Miller	Liberty ship	Oregon Shipbuilding Corporation	Portland, Oregon	United States	For War Shipping Administration.
9 December	Patrick H. Morrissey	Liberty ship	J. A. Jones Construction Co.	Brunswick, Georgia	United States	For War Shipping Administration.
9 December	Robert Wickliffe	Liberty ship	Bethlehem Fairfield Shipyard	Baltimore, Maryland	United States	Completed as Sambalt for Ministry of War Transport.
10 December	Ben H. Miller	Liberty Ship	Bethlehem Shipbuilding Corporation	Baltimore, Maryland	United States	For War Shipping Administration.
10 December	Empire Abbey	Refrigerated cargo ship	Shipbuilding Corporation Ltd	Newcastle upon Tyne	United Kingdom	For Ministry of War Transport
10 December	James Oliver Curwood	Liberty ship	Permanente Metals Corporation	Richmond, California	United States	For War Shipping Administration.
10 December	Jose J. Acosta	Liberty ship	Permanente Metals Corporation	Richmond, California	United States	For War Shipping Administration.
10 December	Ralph Barnes	Liberty ship	Oregon Shipbuilding Corporation	Portland, Oregon	United States	For War Shipping Administration.
10 December	Sherwood Anderson	Liberty ship	California Shipbuilding Corporation	Los Angeles, California	United States	For War Shipping Administration.
10 December	TID 57	TID-class tug	Richard Dunston Ltd.	Thorne	United Kingdom	For the United States Army.
11 December	Charles Morgan	Liberty ship	Todd Houston Shipbuilding Corporation	Houston, Texas	United States	For War Shipping Administration.
11 December	Edgar E. Clark	Liberty ship	J. A. Jones Construction Company	Panama City, Florida	United States	For War Shipping Administration.
11 December	Edward G. Acheson	Liberty ship	Permanente Metals Corporation	Richmond, California	United States	For War Shipping Administration.
11 December	Empire Sedley	Scandinavian type cargo ship	William Gray & Co. Ltd.	West Hartlepool	United Kingdom	For Ministry of War Transport.
11 December	Kadashan Bay	Casablanca-class escort carrier	Kaiser Shipyards	Vancouver, Washington	United States	Converted S4 merchant hull
11 December	Peacock	Black Swan-class sloop			United Kingdom	
11 December	Empire Alderney	Isles-class coastal tanker	J. Harker Ltd.	Knottingley	United Kingdom	For Ministry of War Transport.
11 December	Oxford Castle	Castle-class corvette	Harland & Wolff	Belfast	United Kingdom	For Royal Navy.
11 December	Philip C. Shera	Liberty ship	California Shipbuilding Corporation	Los Angeles, California	United States	For War Shipping Administration.
11 December	Wagon Box	T2 Tanker	Alabama Drydock and Shipbuilding Company	Mobile, Alabama	United States	For War Shipping Administration.
12 December	Anthony F. Lucas	Liberty ship	Todd Houston Shipbuilding Corporation	Houston, Texas	United States	For War Shipping Administration.
12 December	Frank R. Stockton	Liberty ship	Bethlehem Fairfield Shipyard	Baltimore, Maryland	United States	For War Shipping Administration.
12 December	Gabriel Franchere	Liberty ship	Oregon Shipbuilding Corporation	Portland, Oregon	United States	For War Shipping Administration.
12 December	James W. Johnson	Liberty ship	California Shipbuilding Corporation	Los Angeles, California	United States	For War Shipping Administration.
12 December	Peleg Wadsworth	Liberty ship	New England Shipbuilding Corporation	South Portland, Maine	United States	For War Shipping Administration.
13 December	Empire Silas	Near-Warrior type tug	Cochrane & Sons Ltd.	Selby	United Kingdom	For Ministry of War Transport.
13 December	Empire Sophy	Modified Warrior-type tug	Goole Shipbuilding & Repairing Co. Ltd.	Goole		For Ministry of War Transport.
13 December	Heber M. Creel	Liberty ship	Permanente Metals Corporation	Richmond, California	United States	For War Shipping Administration.
13 December	John H. Quick	Liberty ship	California Shipbuilding Corporation	Los Angeles, California	United States	For War Shipping Administration.
13 December	MMS 304	MMS-class minesweeper	J. Bolson & Son Ltd.	Poole	United Kingdom	For Royal Navy.
14 December	Empire Betsy	Near-Warrior type tug	Cochrane & Sons Ltd.	Selby	United Kingdom	For Ministry of War Transport.
14 December	Francis Wilson	Liberty ship	Permanente Metals Corporation	Richmond, California	United States	For War Shipping Administration.
14 December	Martha C. Thomas	Liberty ship	Bethlehem Fairfield Shipyard	Baltimore, Maryland	United States	Completed as Samharle for Ministry of War Transport.
14 December	Owen Wister	Liberty ship	St. Johns River Shipbuilding Company	Jacksonville, Florida	United States	For War Shipping Administration.
14 December	Vicksburg	Cleveland-class light cruiser	Newport News Shipbuilding & Dry Dock Company	Newport News, VA	United States	
14 December	William A. Henry	Liberty ship	Oregon Shipbuilding Corporation	Portland, Oregon	United States	For War Shipping Administration.
15 December	Claud Spreckles	Liberty ship	Permanente Metals Corporation	Richmond, California	United States	For War Shipping Administration.
15 December	Eugene W. Hilgard	Liberty ship	Delta Shipbuilding	New Orleans, Louisiana	United States	For War Shipping Administration.
15 December	Joe C. S. Blackburn	Liberty ship	J. A. Jones Construction Co.	Brunswick, Georgia	United States	For War Shipping Administration.
15 December	Salvador Brau	Liberty ship	J. A. Jones Construction Company	Panama City, Florida	United States	For War Shipping Administration.
15 December	Thomas Wolfe	Liberty ship	Southeastern Shipbuilding Corporation	Savannah, Georgia	United States	For War Shipping Administration.
16 December	Byron Darnton	Liberty ship	Bethlehem Fairfield Shipyard	Baltimore, Maryland	United States	For War Shipping Administration.
16 December	David Lubin	Liberty ship	Permanente Metals Corporation	Richmond, California	United States	For War Shipping Administration.
16 December	Grant P. Marsh	Liberty ship	Oregon Shipbuilding Corporation	Portland, Oregon	United States	For War Shipping Administration.
16 December	Marcus Island	Casablanca-class escort carrier	Kaiser Shipyards	Vancouver, Washington	United States	Converted S4 merchant hull
17 December	Carl Thusgaard	Liberty ship	Bethlehem Fairfield Shipyard	Baltimore, Maryland	United States	Completed as Samkey for Ministry of War Transport.
17 December	Charles Fort	Liberty ship	California Shipbuilding Corporation	Los Angeles, California	United States	For War Shipping Administration.
17 December	John W. Gates	Liberty ship	Todd Houston Shipbuilding Corporation	Houston, Texas	United States	For War Shipping Administration.
17 December	Mason L. Weems	Liberty ship	Delta Shipbuilding	New Orleans, Louisiana	United States	For War Shipping Administration.
17 December	TID 58	TID-class tug	Richard Dunston Ltd.	Thorne	United Kingdom	For Ministry of War Transport.
17 December	VIC 36	VIC lighter	Richard Dunston Ltd.	Thorne	United Kingdom	For the Admiralty.
17 December	William Becknell	Liberty ship	Todd Houston Shipbuilding Corporation	Houston, Texas	United States	For War Shipping Administration.
18 December	Bronson Alcott	Liberty ship	New England Shipbuilding Corporation	South Portland, Maine	United States	For War Shipping Administration.
18 December	Frank J. Sprague	Liberty ship	Permanente Metals Corporation	Richmond, California	United States	For War Shipping Administration.
18 December	Harry Percy	Liberty ship	Todd Houston Shipbuilding Corporation	Houston, Texas	United States	For War Shipping Administration.
18 December	Melvil Dewey	Liberty ship	Bethlehem Fairfield Shipyard	Baltimore, Maryland	United States	Completed as Samsacola for Ministry of War Transport.
18 December	Millen Griffith	Liberty ship	Permanente Metals Corporation	Richmond, California	United States	For War Shipping Administration.
18 December	Narcissa Whitman	Liberty ship	Oregon Shipbuilding Corporation	Portland, Oregon	United States	For War Shipping Administration.
19 December	Jean P. Chouteau	Liberty ship	Permanente Metals Corporation	Richmond, California	United States	For War Shipping Administration.
19 December	John Drew	Liberty ship	California Shipbuilding Corporation	Los Angeles, California	United States	For War Shipping Administration.
19 December	Mission Santa Ynez	T2 tanker	Marinship Corporation	Sausalito, California	United States	For United States Maritime Commission.
19 December	Otis Skinner	Liberty ship	Permanente Metals Corporation	Richmond, California	United States	For War Shipping Administration.
20 December	Eugene E. O'Donnell	Liberty ship	New England Shipbuilding Corporation	South Portland, Maine	United States	For War Shipping Administration.
20 December	Frederick Bunting	Liberty ship	Bethlehem Fairfield Shipyard	Baltimore, Maryland	United States	For War Shipping Administration.
20 December	Isaac I. Stevens	Liberty ship	Oregon Shipbuilding Corporation	Portland, Oregon	United States	For War Shipping Administration.
20 December	Julia L. Dumont	Liberty ship	Permanente Metals Corporation	Richmond, California	United States	For War Shipping Administration.
20 December	Louis A. Godey	Liberty ship	Southeastern Shipbuilding Corporation	Savannah, Georgia	United States	For War Shipping Administration.
20 December	Samdon	Liberty ship	New England Shipbuilding Corporation	South Portland, Maine	United States	For Ministry of War Transport.
21 December	Elizabeth C. Bellamy	Liberty ship	St. Johns River Shipbuilding Company	Jacksonville, Florida	United States	For War Shipping Administration.
21 December	Empire Cromer	Refrigerated cargo liner	Short Brothers Ltd.	Sunderland, Co Durham	United Kingdom	For Ministry of War Transport
21 December	Martin Van Buren	Liberty ship	Bethlehem Fairfield Shipyard	Baltimore, Maryland	United States	For War Shipping Administration.
21 December	Rebecca Boone	Liberty ship	Todd Houston Shipbuilding Corporation	Houston, Texas	United States	For War Shipping Administration.
21 December	William R. Cox	Liberty ship	Bethlehem Fairfield Shipyard	Baltimore, Maryland	United States	Completed as Samtweed for Ministry of War Transport.
21 December	William Wolfskill	Liberty ship	California Shipbuilding Corporation	Los Angeles, California	United States	For War Shipping Administration.
22 December	Elmenhorst	Hansa A Type cargo ship	Van Vliet & Co	Hardinxveld	Netherlands	For Godeffroy & Co
22 December	Hart Crane	Liberty ship	California Shipbuilding Corporation	Los Angeles, California	United States	For War Shipping Administration.
22 December	John B. Lennon	Liberty ship	J. A. Jones Construction Co.	Brunswick, Georgia	United States	For War Shipping Administration.
22 December	Savo Island	Casablanca-class escort carrier	Kaiser Shipyards	Vancouver, Washington	United States	Converted S4 merchant hull
22 December	William I. Chamberlain	Liberty ship	Oregon Shipbuilding Corporation	Portland, Oregon	United States	For War Shipping Administration.
23 December	Jack Singer	Liberty ship	California Shipbuilding Corporation	Los Angeles, California	United States	For War Shipping Administration.
23 December	J. C. W. Beckham	Liberty ship	Delta Shipbuilding	New Orleans, Louisiana	United States	For War Shipping Administration.
23 December	John Sherman	Liberty ship	Permanente Metals Corporation	Richmond, California	United States	For War Shipping Administration.
23 December	Robert G. Cousins	Liberty ship	Permanente Metals Corporation	Richmond, California	United States	For War Shipping Administration.
23 December	TID 59	TID-class tug	Richard Dunston Ltd.	Thorne	United Kingdom	For the War Department.
24 December	Edward Kavanagh	Liberty ship	New England Shipbuilding Corporation	South Portland, Maine	United States	For War Shipping Administration.
24 December	George B. Porter	Liberty ship	Permanente Metals Corporation	Richmond, California	United States	For War Shipping Administration.
24 December	Wilkes-Barre	Cleveland-class light cruiser	New York Shipbuilding Corporation	Camden, NJ	United States	
24 December	Empire Curzon	Cargo ship	John Readhead & Sons	Sunderland, Co Durham	United Kingdom	For Ministry of War Transport
26 December	Charles Paddock	Liberty ship	California Shipbuilding Corporation	Los Angeles, California	United States	For War Shipping Administration.
27 December	Empire Daughter	Icemaid type collier	Grangemouth Dockyard Co Ltd	Grangemouth	United Kingdom	For Ministry of War Transport.
27 December	Megna	Cargo ship	Charles Connell & Co Ltd	Glasgow	United Kingdom	For J. Nourse Ltd.
28 December	Bela	Intermediate type tanker	Sir J. Laing & Sons Ltd.	Sunderland	United Kingdom	For Anglo-Saxon Petroleum Co. Ltd.
28 December	Edward J. O'Brien	Liberty ship	California Shipbuilding Corporation	Los Angeles, California	United States	For War Shipping Administration.
28 December	Harold T. Andrews	Liberty ship	J. A. Jones Construction Company	Panama City, Florida	United States	For War Shipping Administration.
28 December	Pasadena	Cleveland-class light cruiser	Bethlehem Steel Company	Quincy, MA	United States	
28 December	Pipiriki	Refrigerated cargo liner	Alexander Stephen & Sons Ltd.	Linthouse	United Kingdom	For New Zealand Shipping Co. Ltd.
28 December	William Ford Nichols	Liberty ship	Permanente Metals Corporation	Richmond, California	United States	For War Shipping Administration.
29 December	CHANT 52	CHANT	Furness Shipbuilding Co. Ltd.	Haverton Hill-on-Tees	United Kingdom	For Ministry of War Transport.
29 December	Dallas City	Cargo ship	William Gray & Co. Ltd.	West Hartlepool	United Kingdom	For Leeds Shipping Co. Ltd.
29 December	Mary E. Kinnney	Liberty ship	Oregon Shipbuilding Corporation	Portland, Oregon	United States	For War Shipping Administration.
29 December	Ommaney Bay	Casablanca-class escort carrier	Kaiser Shipyards	Vancouver, Washington	United States	Converted S4 merchant hull
30 December	City of Chester	Cargo ship	Barclay, Curle & Co. Ltd.	Glasgow	United Kingdom	For Ellerman Limes.
30 December	Drina	Refrigerated cargo ship	Harland & Wolff	Belfast	United Kingdom	For Royal Mail Line.
30 December	Henry R. Schoolcraft	Liberty ship	Permanente Metals Corporation	Richmond, California	United States	For War Shipping Administration.
30 December	Lillian Wald	Liberty ship	Permanente Metals Corporation	Richmond, California	United States	For War Shipping Administration.
30 December	Robert I. Paine	Buckley-class destroyer escort	Bethlehem Shipbuilding Corporation	Hingham, Massachusetts	United States	
30 December	Venerable	Colossus-class light carrier	Cammell Laird	Birkenhead, England	United Kingdom	
30 December	Empire Walter	Near-Warrior type tug	Henry Scarr Ltd.	Hessle	United Kingdom	For Ministry of War Transport.
31 December	George Luks	Liberty ship	Permanente Metals Corporation	Richmond, California	United States	For War Shipping Administration.
31 December	Harrington Emerson	Liberty ship	Oregon Shipbuilding Corporation	Portland, Oregon	United States	For War Shipping Administration.
31 December	Henry L. Gantt	Liberty ship	California Shipbuilding Corporation	Los Angeles, California	United States	For War Shipping Administration.
31 December	John White	Liberty ship	St. Johns River Shipbuilding Company	Jacksonville, Florida	United States	For War Shipping Administration.
31 December	Mission San Rafael	T2 tanker	Marinship Corporation	Sausalito, California	United States	For United States Maritime Commission.
31 December	Samcree	Liberty ship	Bethlehem Fairfield Shipyard	Baltimore, Maryland	United States	For Ministry of War Transport.
31 December	Samettrick	Liberty ship	Bethlehem Fairfield Shipyard	Baltimore, Maryland	United States	For Ministry of War Transport.
31 December	Skull Bar	T2 Tanker	Alabama Drydock and Shipbuilding Company	Mobile, Alabama	United States	For War Shipping Administration.
31 December	Washita	T2 Tanker	Alabama Drydock and Shipbuilding Company	Mobile, Alabama	United States	For War Shipping Administration.
December	VIC 39	VIC lighter	Brown's Shipbuilding & Dry Dock Co. Ltd.	Hull	United Kingdom	For the Admiralty.

== Unknown date ==
Date	Ship	Class	Builder	Location	Country	Notes
Unknown date	Aletta Noot	Cargo ship	Gävle Varvs & Verkstads Nya AB	Gävle	Sweden	For Franz Haniel & Cie GmbH
Unknown date	Binz	Coastal tanker	Gutehoffnungschutte AG	Walsum	Germany	For Kriegsmarine
Unknown date	Celia	Hansa A Type cargo ship	Lübecker Maschinenbau-Gesellschaft	Lübeck	Germany	For A. Kirsten
Unknown date	Empire Billow	Water carrier	W. J. Yarwood & Sons	Northwich	United Kingdom	For Ministry of War Transport.
Unknown date	Empire Citizen	Collier	Grangemouth Dockyard Company	Grangemouth	United Kingdom	For Ministry of War Transport
Unknown date	Georg	Coastal tanker	Greifenwerft AG	Stettin	Germany	For Kriegsmarine.
Unknown date	Glücksburg	Coaster	Lidingö Nya Varv & Vaerkstaeder AB	Lidingö	Sweden	For H C Horn, requisition by Kriegsmarine on completion
Unknown date	Halsnaes	Cargo ship	Helsingørs Maskinbyggeri.	Helsingør	Denmark	For private owner.
Unknown date	HDML 1246	Harbour Defence Motor Launch	Bathurst & Co	Tewkesbury	United Kingdom	For Royal Navy.
Unknown date	Heidberg	Cargo ship	Helsingborgs Varfs AB	Helsingborg	Sweden	For August Bolten Wm Müllers Nachtfolger
Unknown date	Hendrik Fisser VI	Hansa A Type cargo ship	NV Werft Gusto	Schiedam	Netherlands	For Fisser & Van Doornum
Unknown date	Leng Maru No.3	Tanker			Japan	For private owner.
Unknown date	L. H. McNelly	Liberty ship	Houston Shipbuilding Corp	Houston, Texas	United States	For War Shipping Administration
Unknown date	MFV-35	Naval Motor Fishing Vessel	Brooke Marine Ltd.	Lowestoft	United Kingdom	For Royal Navy.
Unknown date	MFV-36	Naval Motor Fishing Vessel	Brooke Marine Ltd.	Lowestoft	United Kingdom	For Royal Navy.
Unknown date	MFV-37	Naval Motor Fishing Vessel	Brooke Marine Ltd.	Lowestoft	United Kingdom	For Royal Navy.
Unknown date	MFV-38	Naval Motor Fishing Vessel	Brooke Marine Ltd.	Lowestoft	United Kingdom	For Royal Navy.
Unknown date	MFV-57	Naval Motor Fishing Vessel	Anderson, Rigden & Perkins Ltd.	Whitstable	United Kingdom	For Royal Navy.
Unknown date	MFV-58	Naval Motor Fishing Vessel	Anderson, Rigden & Perkins Ltd.	Whitstable	United Kingdom	For Royal Navy.
Unknown date	MFV-101	Naval Motor Fishing Vessel	Anderson, Rigden & Perkins Ltd.	Whitstable	United Kingdom	For Royal Navy.
Unknown date	Millerntor	Hansa B type cargo ship	Nakskov Skibs Akt.	Nakskov	Denmark	For Hamburg America Line.
Unknown date	MMS 234	MMS-class minesweeper	J. Bolson & Son Ltd.	Poole	United Kingdom	For Royal Navy.
Unknown date	MOWT 4	Crane barge	Fairfield Shipbuilding and Engineering Co. Ltd.	Chepstow	United Kingdom	For Ministry of War Transport.
Unknown date	MOWT 6	Crane barge	Fairfield Shipbuilding and Engineering Co. Ltd.	Chepstow	United Kingdom	For Ministry of War Transport.
Unknown date	MOWT 11	Crane barge	Palmers (Hebburn) Co. Ltd.	Hebburn	United Kingdom	For Ministry of War Transport.
Unknown date	MOWT 12	Crane barge	Palmers (Hebburn) Co. Ltd.	Hebburn	United Kingdom	For Ministry of War Transport.
Unknown date	MOWT 13	Crane barge	Palmers (Hebburn) Co. Ltd.	Hebburn	United Kingdom	For Ministry of War Transport.
Unknown date	MOWT 14	Crane barge	Palmers (Hebburn) Co. Ltd.	Hebburn	United Kingdom	For Ministry of War Transport.
Unknown date	MOWT 28	Floating crane	Barry Graving Dock & Engineering Company	Barry	United Kingdom	For Ministry of War Transport.
Unknown date	MTB 681	Motor Torpedo Boat	Brooke Marine Ltd.	Lowestoft	United Kingdom	For Royal Navy.
Unknown date	St. Anne	Concrete barge	W. & C. French Ltd.	Grays Thurrock	United Kingdom	For F. T. Everard & Sons Ltd.
Unknown date	St. Asaph	Concrete barge	W. & C. French Ltd.	Grays Thurrock	United Kingdom	For F. T. Everard & Sons Ltd.
Unknown date	St. Austell	Concrete barge	W. & C. French Ltd.	Grays Thurrock	United Kingdom	For F. T. Everard & Sons Ltd.
Unknown date	VIC 28	VIC lighter	Isaac Pimblott & Sons Ltd.	Northwich	United Kingdom	For the Admiralty.
Unknown date	VIC 38	VIC lighter	Brown's Shipbuilding & Dry Dock Co. Ltd.	Hull	United Kingdom	For the Admiralty.
Unknown date	Wilhelmshaven	Cargo ship	Duivendijks Scheepwerke	Lekkerkerk	Netherlands	For Hamburg Amerikanische Packetfahrt AG
Unknown date	Unnamed	Tanker	Gutehoffnungschutte AG.	Walsum	Germany	For Kriegsmarine. Completed in 1946 as Kapitan Plaushevski for the Soviet Union.
