= List of Liberty ships (W–William G) =

This is a list of Liberty ships with names beginning with W to William G.

== Description ==
The standard Liberty ship (EC-2-S-C1 type) was a cargo ship 441 feet 6 inches (134.57 m) long overall, with a beam of 56 feet 10 3/4 inches (17.34 m). It had a depth of 37 feet 4 inches (11.38 m) and a draft of 26 feet 10 inches (8.18 m). It was powered by a triple expansion steam engine, which had cylinders of 24 1/2 inches (62 cm), 37 inches (94 cm) and 70 inches (180 cm) diameter by 48 inches (120 cm) stroke. The engine produced 2,500ihp at 76rpm. Driving a four-blade propeller 18 feet 6 inches (5.64 m) in diameter, could propel the ship at 11 knots (20 km/h).

Cargo was carried in five holds, numbered 1–5 from bow to stern. Grain capacity was 84,183 cubic feet (2,383.8 m^{3}), 145,604 cubic feet (4,123.0 m^{3}), 96,429 cubic feet (2,730.6 m^{3}), 93,190 cubic feet (2,639 m^{3}) and 93,190 cubic feet (2,639 m^{3}), with a further 49,086 cubic feet (1,390.0 m^{3}) in the deep tanks. Bale capacity was 75,405 cubic feet (2,135.2 m^{3}), 134,638 cubic feet (3,812.5 m^{3}), 83,697 cubic feet (2,370.0 m^{3}), 82,263 cubic feet (2,329.4 m^{3}) and 82,435 cubic feet (2,334.3 m^{3}), with a further 41,135 cubic feet (1,164.8 m^{3}) in the deep tanks.

It carried a crew of 45, plus 36 United States Navy Armed Guard gunners. Later in the war, this was altered to a crew of 52, plus 29 gunners. Accommodation was in a three deck superstructure placed midships. The galley was equipped with a range, a 25 US gallons (95 L) stock kettle and other appliances. Messrooms were equipped with an electric hot plate and an electric toaster.

== Wade Hampton ==
Wade Hampton was built by Delta Shipbuilding Company. New Orleans, Louisiana. Her keel was laid on 8 September 1942. She was launched on 6 November and delivered on 24 November. Built for the War Shipping Administration (WSA), she was operated under the management of Mississippi Shipping Co. She was torpedoed and damaged 250 nautical miles (460 km) east of Cape Farewell, Greenland (59°49′N 34°43′W) by U-405 on 28 February 1943 whilst a member of Convoy HX 227 from New York to Murmansk, Soviet Union. She broke in two and sank the next day.

== Waigstill Avery ==
Waigstill Avery was built by North Carolina Shipbuilding Company, Wilmington, North Carolina. Her keel was laid on 24 March 1943. She was launched on 22 April and delivered on 28 April. She was scrapped at Troon, United Kingdom in December 1960.

== Walker D. Hines ==
Walker D. Hines was built by Delta Shipbuilding Company. Her keel was laid on 18 April 1944. She was launched on 2 June and delivered on 17 July. Laid up in the Hudson River post-war, she was scuttled in the Atlantic Ocean (39°36′N 70°00′W) with a cargo of obsolete ammunition on 25 June 1970.

== Walker Taylor ==
Walker Taylor was built by North Carolina Shipbuilding Company. Her keel was laid on 25 February 1943. She was launched on 28 March and delivered on 5 April. She was scrapped at Portland, Maine in December 1959.

== Wallace M. Tyler ==
Wallace M. Tyler was built by Todd Houston Shipbuilding Corporation, Houston, Texas. Her keel was laid on 20 December 1944. She was launched on 25 January 1945 and delivered on 5 February. Built for the WSA, she was operated under the management of Smith & Johnson. Management transferred to United States Navigation Co. in 1946. She was laid up in the James River in 1947. Sold in 1951 to Mercador Trading Co., New York and renamed Seastar. Sold in 1956 to Traders Steamship Corp., New York. Sold in 1960 to Proteus Shipping Co. and renamed Archon. Reflagged to Greece and operated under the management of Triton Shipping Inc. Sold in 1966 to Synthia Shipping Co., Panama. Reflagged to Liberia and operated under the management of Nereus Shipping. She was scrapped at Edajima, Japan in November 1966.

== Wallace R. Farrington ==
Wallace R. Farrington was built by Permanente Metals Corporation, Richmond, California. Her keel was laid on 9 March 1944. She was launched on 31 March and delivered on 7 April. She was scrapped at Mobile, Alabama in April 1969.

== Walter Camp ==
Walter Camp was built by Permanente Metals Corporation. Her keel was laid on 14 April 1943. She was launched on 10 May and delivered on 22 May. Built for the WSA, she was operated under the management of American President Lines. She was torpedoed and sunk in the Indian Ocean (10°00′N 71°49′E) by U-532 on 25 January 1944 whilst on a voyage from New York to Calcutta, India.

== Walter Colton ==
Walter Colton was built by Permanente Metals Corporation. Her keel was laid on 7 November 1942. She was launched on 10 December and delivered on 19 December. She was scrapped at Portland, Oregon in March 1968.

== Walter E. Ranger ==
Walter E. Ranger was built by New England Shipbuilding Corporation, South Portland, Maine. Her keel was laid on 12 November 1942. She was launched on 31 January 1943 and delivered on 19 February. Laid up in the James River post-war, she was scrapped at Cartagena, Spain in October 1972.

== Walter Forward ==
Walter Forward was built by Oregon Shipbuilding Corporation, Portland, Oregon. Her keel was laid on 31 March 1942. She was launched on 11 May and delivered on 28 May. Built for the WSA, she was operated under the management of Weyerhaeuser Steamship Co. Laid up at Beaumont post-war, she was scrapped there in August 1961.

== Walter F. Perry ==
Walter F. Perry was a boxed aircraft transport built by New England Shipbuilding Corporation. Her keel was laid on 11 July 1945. She was launched on 25 September and delivered on 20 October. Laid up in the James River post-war, she was sold to New York shipbreakers in December 1972.

== Walter Frederick Kraft ==
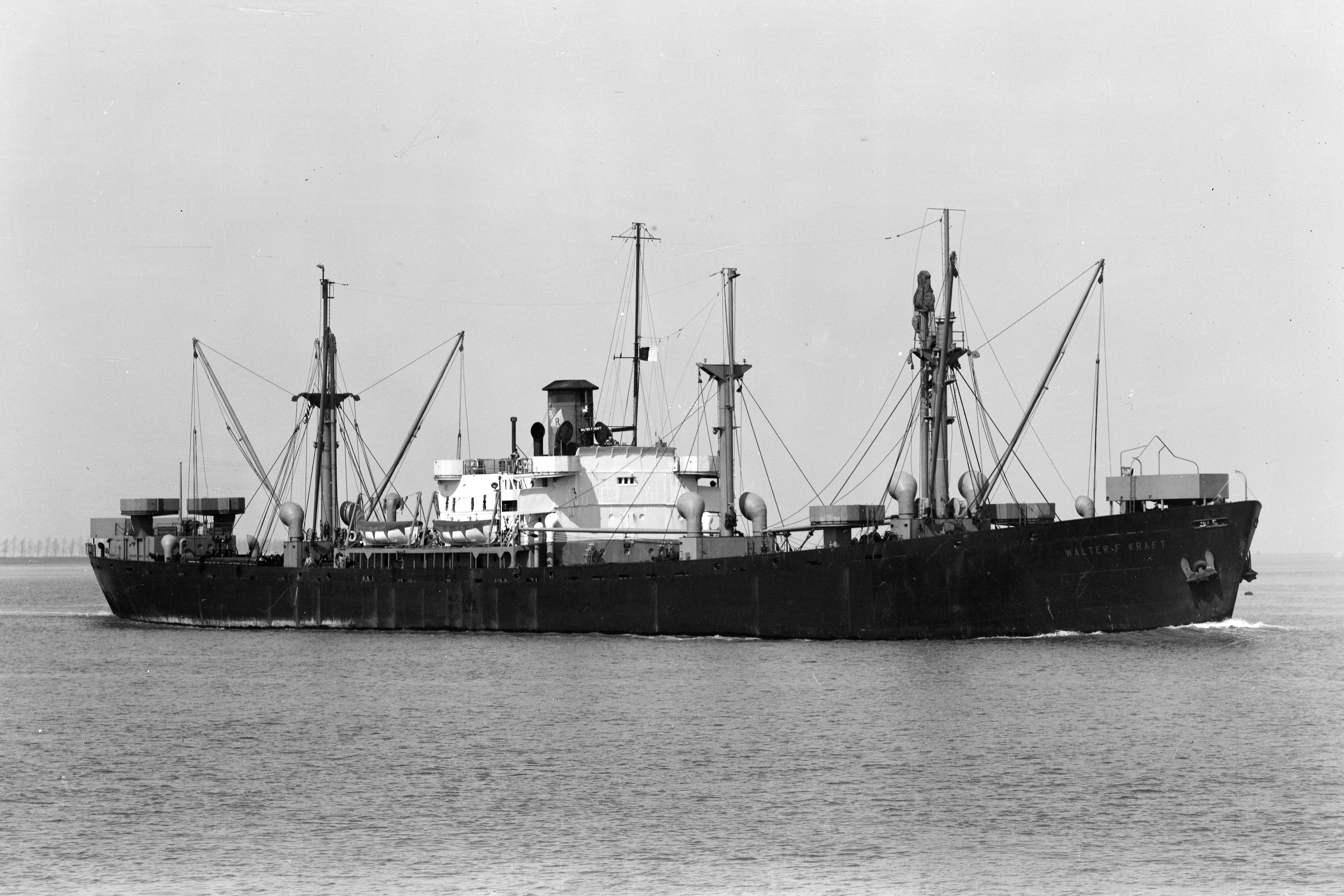
Walter F. Kraft

Walter Frederick Kraft was built by Todd Houston Shipbuilding Corporation. Her keel was laid on 17 November 1944. She was launched on 20 December and delivered on 20 December. Built for the WSA, she was operated under the management of Blidberg Rothchild Company. Management transferred to States Marine Corp., Delaware, New York in 1946. Sold in 1947 to Global Transport Co., Panama and renamed Global Farmer. Sold later that year to States Marine Corp. and renamed Evergreen State. Sold in 1955 to Compania de Transporte y Navigation and renamed Marcell M.H. Reflagged to Liberia and operated under the management of Transamerican Steamship Corp. Sold in 1963 to Marcell M.H. Steamship Co., remaining under the same flag and management. She was scrapped at Aioi, Japan in June 1967.

== Walter Hines Page ==
Walter Hines Page was built by North Carolina Shipbuilding Company. Her keel was laid on 1 April 1943. She was launched on 27 April and delivered on 4 May. To the Polish Government under Lend-Lease in 1945 and renamed Opole. Returned to United States Maritime Commission (USMC) in 1947 and renamed Walter Hines Page. Operated under the management of Grace Line Inc. Management transferred to Arnold Bernstein Shipping Co. later that year, then to South Atlantic Steamship Co. in 1948. Laid up at Wilmington, North Carolina later that year. Operated under the management of American-Foreign Steamship Company 1951–52, then laid up at Wilmington. Operated under the management of American Coal Shipping Inc. 1956–58, then laid up in the James River. She was scuttled off Wachapreague, North Carolina in 1975.

== Walter Kidde ==
Walter Kidde was built by Bethlehem Fairfield Shipyard. Her keel was laid on 3 June 1944. She was launched on 10 July and delivered on 22 July. Built for the WSA, she was operated under the management of American Liberty Steamship Co. Management transferred to United States Navigation Co. in 1946. Sold later that year to Calmar Steamship Corp., New York. Renamed Yorkmar in 1947. Sold in 1955 to Bethlehem Steel Corp., Bethlehem, Pennsylvania. Operated under the management of Calmar Steamship Corp. To the United States Department of Commerce in 1964. in exchange for a Type C4 ship. Sold in 1965 to Zidell Explorations, Portland, Oregon. She was scrapped at Tacoma, Washington in February 1966.

== Walter L. Fleming ==
Walter L. Fleming was built by J. A. Jones Construction Company, Panama City. Her keel was laid on 31 October 1943. She was launched on 7 December and delivered on 30 January 1944. She was scrapped at Baltimore, Maryland in January 1961.

== Walter M. Christiansen ==
Walter M. Christiansen was built by St. Johns River Shipbuilding Company, Jacksonville, Florida. Her keel was laid on 15 November 1944. She was launched on 16 December and delivered on 27 December. Built for the WSA, she was operated under the management of American Liberty Steamship Co. She was laid up in the Hudson River in 1948. Sold in 1951 to Zenith Steamship Co. and renamed Sea Comet. Operated under the management of D. J. Negroponte Inc. Sold in 1952 to Ocean Transportation Co., New York and renamed Ocean Ulla. Placed under the management of Maritime Overseas Corp. in 1953. Sold in 1958 to Hope Steamship Corp. and renamed Valiant Hope. Operated under the management of Ocean Carriers Corp. Sold in 1960 to Pacific Ocean Shipping Co. and renamed Ocean Rover. Reflagged to Liberia and operated under the management of Amerind Steamship Co. Sold later that year to Interocean Navigation Co. and renamed Pacific Venture. Remaining under the Liberian flag and operatged under the management of Associated Maritime Industries. Management transferred to Wah Kwong & Co. in 1962. She was scrapped at Kaohsiung in May 1967.

== Walter Q. Gresham ==
Walter Q. Gresham was built by Delta Shipbuilding Company. Her keel was laid on 4 December 1942. She was launched on 16 January 1943 and delivered on 30 January. Built for the WSA, she was operated under the management of Standard Fruit & Steamship Company. She was torpedoed and sunk in the Atlantic Ocean (53°35′N 28°05′W) by German submarine U-221 on 18 March 1943 whilst on a voyage from New York to the River Clyde.

== Walter Raleigh ==
Walter Raleigh was built by North Carolina Shipbuilding Company. her keel was laid on 1 December 1942. She was launched on 5 January 1943 and delivered on 16 January. She was scrapped at Kearny in December 1967.

== Walter Reed ==
Walter Reed was built by Kaiser Company, Vancouver, Washington. She was delivered in February 1943. Sold for scrap on 19 January 1967, she was scrapped at Mobile in July 1967.

== Walter W. Schwenk ==
Walter W. Schwenk was a boxed aircraft transport built by J. A. Jones Construction Company, Panama City. Her keel was laid on 9 June 1945. She was launched on 21 July and delivered on 22 August. Laid up at Mobile post-war, she was scrapped there in March 1972.

== Walter Wellman ==
Walter Wellman was built by Todd Houston Shipbuilding Corporation. Her keel was laid on 21 August 1944. She was launched on 29 September and delivered on 9 October. Laid up in the James River post-war, she was scrapped at Kearny in May 1972.

== Walter Williams ==
Walter Williams was built by Permanente Metals Corporation. Her keel was laid on 2 November 1943. She was launched on 21 November and delivered on 29 November. She was scrapped at Portland, Oregon in July 1960.

== Walter Wyman ==
Walter Wyman was built by Permanente Metals Corporation. Her keel was laid on 21 January 1944. She was launched on 14 February and delivered on 24 March. Built for the WSA, she was operated under the management of Hammond Shipping Co. Sold in 1947 to Società Commerciale de Navigazione, Genoa, Italy and renamed Italcielo. New diesel engine fitted by FIAT at Genoa in 1950. Sold in 1965 to Lloyd's Africa Ltd. and renamed Greenport. Reflagged to Liberia and operated under the management of Transamerican Steamship Corp. She was scrapped at Faslane, United Kingdom in April 1972.

== Walt Whitman ==
Walt Whitman was built by Oregon Shipbuilding Corporation. Her keel was laid on 31 March 1942. She was launched on 11 May and delivered on 28 May. Built for the WSA, she was operated under the management of Weyerhaeuser Steamship Co. Laid up at Beaumont, Texas post-war, She was scrapped at Brownsville, Texas in June 1972.

== Ward Hunt ==
Ward Hunt was a limited troop carrier built by Bethlehem Fairfield Shipyard. Her keel was laid on 19 March 1943. She was launched on 23 April and delivered on 30 April. Built for the WSA, she was operated under the management of A. H. Bull & Co. Sold in 1948 to Mount Steamship Corp. and renamed Carolinian. Operated under the management of American-Hawaiian Steamship Company, New York. Sold to her managers in 1949. Sold in 1950 to Shephard Steamship Co., Boston, Massachusetts and renamed Harpoon. Sold in 1954 to Oceanica Compania Navigation, Panama and renamed Harpoon. Reflagged to Liberia and operated under the management of D. J. Negroponte. Inc. Management transferred to Seatraders Inc. in 1956. Sold in 1957 to San Rafael Compania Navigation, Panama and renamed Andros Fighter. Remaining under the Liberian flag and operated under the management of Orion Shipping & Trading Co. Sold later that year to Jackson Steamship Co. Operated under the management of Suwannee Steamship Co. Sold on 1962 to Seaforth Steamship Corp., New York. Operated under the management of Orion Shipping & Trading Co. She was scrapped at Dalmuir, United Kingdom in 1963.

== Warren Delano ==
Warren Delano was built by Bethlehem Fairfield Shipyard. Her keel was laid on 22 January 1944. She was launched on 24 February and delivered on 4 March. Built for the WSA, she was operated under the management of Marine Transport Lines. Management transferred to Marine Operating Co. in 1946. She was laid up at Beaumont in 1947. Sold in 1951 to Pacific Cargo Carriers Corp. and renamed Seachampion. Operated under the management of Orion Shipping & Trading Co. Sold in 1954 to Pacifica Societa de Carga, Panama and renamed Champion. Reflagged to Liberia, remaining under the same management. Renamed Konstantinos V in 1955. Sold in 1960 to Baltic Shipping Corp. Reflagged to Greece, remaining under the same management. Sold in 1962 to Alexandra Navigation Corp. and renamed Silvana. Reflagged to Liberia and operated under the management of Eddie Steamship Corp. Sold in 1964 to Outerocean Navigation Corp. and renamed Kuo Tai. Reflagged to China, remaining under the same management. Reflagged to Taiwan in 1965. She was scrapped at Kaohsiung in June 1966.

== Warren P. Marks ==
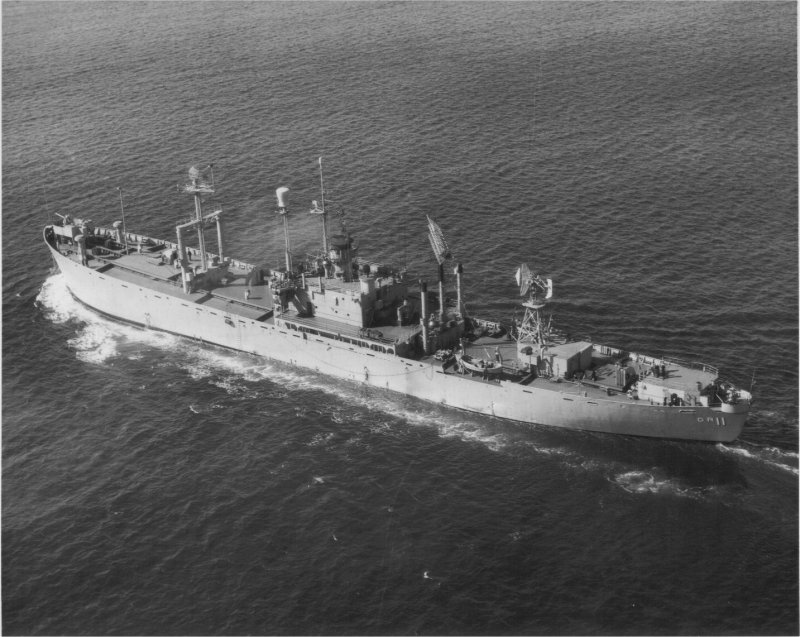
USS Protector

Warren P. Marks was a boxed aircraft transport built by J. A. Jones Construction Co., Panama City. Her keel was laid on 31 January 1945. She was launched on 15 March and delivered on 29 March. To the United States Navy in 1956 and renamed Protector. Converted for naval use at Charleston Naval Shipyard, Charleston, South Carolina. Laid up in the Hudson River in July 1965. Moved to the James River in 1970. She was scuttled off the coast of North Carolina in 1984.

== Warren Stone ==
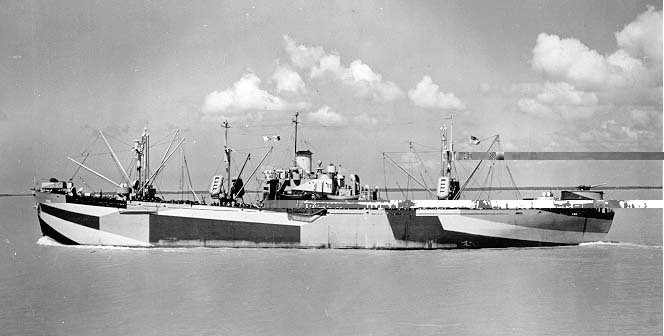
USS Arkab

Warren Stone was built by Delta Shipbuilding Company. Her keel was laid on 4 December 1943. She was launched as Warren Stoneon 22 January 1944 and delivered to the United States Navy as Arkab on 21 February. Converted for naval use by Alabama Drydock & Shipbuilding Co. Returned to WSA in January 1946 and renamed Warren Stone. Laid up in the James River. She was scrapped at Burriana, Spain in November 1971.

== Washington Allston ==
Washington Allston was built by New England Shipbuilding Corporation. Her keel was laid on 19 December 1943. She was launched on 9 February 1944 and delivered on 22 February. Built for the WSA, she was operated under the management of Eastern Gas & Fuel Association. To the Dutch Government in 1946 and renamed Thorbecke. Renamed Lutterkerk in 1947 and placed under the management of Vereenigde Nederlandsche Scheepvaarts Maatschappij., Den Haag. Sold to her managers in 1950. Sold in 1962 to Compania de Navigation Michaels Line, of Panama & Athens, Greece and renamed Maria Despina. Reflagged to Lebanon. Sold in 1963 to Misisapa Navigation, Panama & Athens. She ran aground off Alexandria, Egypt on 18 March 1966 whilst on a voyage from Shanghai, China to Alexandria. She broke in two on 20 March and was declared a constructive total loss. The 225 feet (69 m) long bow section was later refloated. It was converted to a 5,488 GRT crane barge by Timsah Shipbuilding Co., Alexandria in 1968. The barge was named El Alamein.

== Washington Irving ==
Washington Irving was built by Oregon Shipbuilding Corporation. Her keel was laid on 7 April 1942. She was launched on 22 May and delivered on 5 June. Laid up in the James River post-war, she was scrapped at Castellón de la Plana, Spain in March 1972.

== Watson C. Squire ==
Watson C. Squire was built by Oregon Shipbuilding Corporation. Her keel was laid on 27 September 1943. She was launched on 15 October and delivered on 30 October. She was scrapped at Oakland, California in April 1961.

== Wayne MacVeagh ==
Wayne MacVeagh was built by Permanente Metals Corporation. Her keel was laid on 11 August 1943. She was launched on 2 September and delivered on 11 September. Laid up at Mobile post-war, she was scrapped at Panama City, Florida in June 1969.

== W. B. Ayer ==
W. B. Ayer was built by Oregon Shipbuilding Corporation. Her keel was laid on 16 September 1943. She was launched on 30 September and delivered on 8 October. Built for the WSA, she was operated under the management of Matson Navigation Co. Sold in 1947 to A/S Mytillus, Arendal, Norway and renamed Marit. Operated under the management of Jørgen P. Jensen. Management transferred to Marlow Wangen in 1950. Sold in 1952 to A/S Jensens Rederi IV, Arendal. Remaining under the same management. Sold in 1955 to Society Pacifica Marina S.A., Monrovia, Liberia and renamed Andros. Operated under the management of Goulandris Ltd. Sold in 1962 to Manna Compania Maritma, Panama and renamed Maira. Operated under the joint management of Kronos Maritime Agency and Trans-Ocean Steamship Agency. Lengthened that year at Maizuru, Japan. Now 511 feet 6 inches (155.91 m) long and 8,426 GRT. Sold in 1967 to St. George Shipping Corp., Monrovia and renamed Panagiotis K. Operated under the management of Palmco Shipping Inc. Sold for breaking in October 1971, she arrived at Gandia, Spain on 6 October. She was scrapped in December 1971.

== W. B. Rodgers ==
W. B. Rodgers was built by Permanente Metals Corporation. Her keel was laid on 2 January 1944. She was launched on 21 January and delivered on 28 January. Built for the WSA, she was operated under the management of United States Lines. Sold in 1947 to Livanos Bros. Maritime Co., Piraeus & London and renamed Akti. Reflagged to Greece. Placed under the management of Economou & Co. in 1952. Sold in 1960 to North Europe & Persian Gulf Transport Corp. and renamed Jenny III. Reflagged to Liberia and operated under the management of Livanos & Sons. She ran aground in the Guayas River, Ecuador on 15 August 1962 whilst on a voyage from Guayaquil to New Orleans. She was refloated on 15 August, but ran aground on the Serrana Bank on 28 August. Refloated on 8 September and towed to New Orleans, where she was declared a constructive total loss. She was scrapped at New Orleans in June 1963.

== W. C. Latta ==
W. C. Latta was built by Delta Shipbuilding Company. Her keel was laid on 28 February 1944. She was launched on 13 April and delivered on 17 May. She was scrapped at Wilmington, Delaware in 1961.

== Webb Miller ==
Webb Miller was built by New England Shipbuilding Corporation. Her keel was laid on 22 October 1943. She was launched on 7 December and delivered on 16 December. Built for the WSA, she was operated under the management of America Liberty Steamship Co. Sold in 1947 to A/S Ulabrand, Tønsberg, Norway and renamed Stugard. Operated under the management of Hjalmar Røed & Co. Sold in 1961 to Lily C. Michalos and renamed Lily C. Michalos. Reflagged to Greece and operated under the management of C. Michalos & Co. She was sold for scrapping in March 1969, arriving at Whampoa, China on 12 March.

== Wendell L. Willkie ==
Wendell L. Willkie was built by J. A. Jones Construction Company, Panama City. Her keel was laid on 8 November 1944. She was launched on 9 December and delivered on 21 December. She was scrapped at Mobile in February 1970.

== Wendell Phillips ==
Wendell Phillips was built by California Shipbuilding Corporation. Her keel was laid on 24 July 1942. She was launched on 31 August and delivered on 17 September. She was scrapped at Wilmington, Delaware in October 1959.

== Wesley W. Barrett ==
Wesley W. Barrett was a boxed aircraft transport built by J. A. Jones Construction Company, Panama City. Her keel was laid on 29 January 1945. She was launched on 7 March and delivered on 21 March. She was scrapped at New Orleans in April 1962.

== Wilbur O. Atwater ==
Wilbur O. Atwater was built by Oregon Shipbuilding Corporation. Her keel was laid on 10 November 1943. She was launched on 29 November and delivered on 13 December. Built for the WSA, she was operated under the management of Northland Transportation Co. To the French Government in 1948 and renamed Oyonnax. Operated under the management of Compagnie des Messageries Maritimes. Sold in 1959 to Vita Shipping Corp. and renamed Leonidas Voyazides. Reflagged to Liberia and operated under the management of Transmarine Shipping Agencies. Sold in 1962 to Compania de Navigation Zita, Panama. Reflagged to Cyprus and operated under the management of Fred Hunter. She was scrapped at Shanghai in June 1968.

== Wilbur Wright ==
Wilbur Wright was built by Permanente Metals Corporation. Her keel was laid on 17 March 1943. She was launched on 14 April and delivered on 27 April. She was reported to have been scrapped at Oakland in October 1966.

== Wildcat ==
Wildcat was a tanker built by Delta Shipbuilding Company. Her keel was laid on as Leon Godchaux 16 November 1943. She was launched as Wildcat on 7 January 1944 and delivered on 16 February. To the United States Navy, converted to a water distilling ship at Key West Navy Yard, Florida. Returned to USMC in January 1947 and renamed Leon Godchaux. Laid up in Puget Sound. She was scrapped at Portland, Oregon in March 1968.

== Wiley Post ==
Wiley Post was built by California Shipbuilding Corporation. Her keel was laid on 27 March 1943. She was launched on 21 April and delivered on 30 April. She was scrapped at Portland, Maine in December 1959.

== Wilfred Grenfell ==
Wilfred Grenfell was built by California Shipbuilding Corporation. Her keel was laid on 22 May 1943. She was launched on 14 June and delivered on 25 June. Laid up in the Hudson River post-war, she was sold to Karachi shipbreakers in December 1970. Resold, she was scrapped at Castellón de la Plana in July 1971.

== Wilfred R. Bellvue ==
Wilfred R. Bellvue was built by New England Shipbuilding Corporation. Her keel was laid on 10 January 1945. She was launched on 3 March and delivered on 15 March. Built for the WSA, she was operated under the management of W. J. Rountree & Co. Sold in 1947 to Edison Steamship Corp., New York and renamed Edison Mariner. She collided with the British steamship Kittiwake in the Scheldt on 21 December 1951 and ran aground. Sold in 1961 to Geotas Compania de Vapores, Panama and renamed Ioannis Daskalelis. Reflagged to Greece and operated under the management of her former owners. Sold in 1964 to Altema Compania Navigation, Panama and renamed Rockport. Reflagged to Liberia and operated under the management of Standard Marine Ltd. She sprang a leak on 1 February 1966 whilst on a voyage from Vancouver to a Japanese port and was abandoned. She was taken in tow, but sank 600 nautical miles (1,100 km) off Midway Island (30°46′N 168°23′W) on 5 February.

== Willard Hall ==
Willard Hall was built by Bethlehem Fairfield Shipyard. Her keel was laid on 29 November 1942. She was launched on 28 December and delivered on 11 January 1943. She was scrapped at Kearny in 1966.

== Willard R. Johnson ==
Willard R. Johnson was built by Todd Houston Shipbuilding Corporation. Her keel was laid on 6 January 1945. She was launched on 9 February and delivered on 21 February. Built for the WSA, she was operated under the management of West India Steamships Inc. Management transferred to Lykes Brothers Steamship Company in 1946. She was laid up at Beaumont in 1948. Sold in 1951 to Jupiter Steamship Corp., New York and renamed Neptunus. Operated under the management of Orion Shipping & Trading Co. Renamed Apollo in 1952. Management transferred to Doric Shipping & Trading Corp. later that year. Sold in 1954 to San Alberto Compania Navigation, Panama and renamed Evimar. Reflagged to Liberia and operated under the management of Starboard Shipping Inc. Sold in 1958 to Luarca Compania Navigation, Panama and renamed Theokeetor. Remaining under the Liberian flag and operated under the management of Sprios Polemis. Sold in 1964 to Viamerito Compania Navigation, Panama and renamed Riverhead. Remaining under the Liberian flag and operated under the management of Bingham Bigotte Shipping Co. Sold in 1965 to Viafiel Compania Navigation, Panama and renamed Maru. Remaining under the Liberian flag and operated under the management of Sprios Polemis & Sons. She was scrapped at Hong Kong in April 1967.

== Will B. Otwell ==
Will B. Otwell was built by Todd Houston Shipbuilding Corporation. Her keel was laid on 25 October 1044. She was launched on 29 November and delivered on 11 December. She was scrapped at Panama City in October 1964.

== Willet M. Hays ==
Willet M. Hays was built by Permanente Metals Corporation. Her keel was laid on 14 February 1944. She was launched on 4 March and delivered on 11 March. Built for the WSA, she was operated under the management of Hammond Shipping Co. To the French Government in 1947 and renamed Coursuelles. Operated under the management of Compagnie Générale Transatlantique. Management transferred to Compagnie des Messageries Maritimes in 1948, then to Sociètè Maritime Nationale in 1961. She was scrapped at Hamburg, West Germany in April 1964.

== William A. Coulter ==
William A. Coulter was built by Permanented Metals Corporation. Her keel was laid on 25 October 1943. She was launched on 19 November and delivered on 29 November. She was scrapped at Oakland in March 1965.

== William A. Dobson (I) ==
William A. Dobson was built by New England Shipbuilding Corporation. Her keel was laid on 9 September 1944. She was launched on 21 October and delivered to the United States Navy as Iolande on 31 October. Converted for naval use by Bethlehem Steel Corp., East Boston, Massachusetts. She was laid up at Pearl Harbor, Hawaii in July 1946. Towed to Suisun Bay in April 1947. She was sold to shipbreakers on the west coast of the United States in October 1972 and was subsequently scrapped.

== William A. Dobson (II) ==
William A. Dobson was built by New England Shipbuilding Corporation. Her keel was laid on 12 November 1944. She was launched on 24 December and delivered on 31 December. Built for the WSA, she was operated under the management of Marine Transport Lines. Management transferred to Marine Operating Co. in 1946. Sold in 1949 to Seatraders Inc., New York and renamed Sea Wind. Reflagged to Liberia in 1954. Sold in 1957 to Pacific Wind Trading Corp. and renamed Pacific Wind. Remaining under the Liberian flag and operated under the management of World Tramping Agencies. Sold in 1959 to World Carriers Inc., New York and renamed Pacific Tide. Reflagged to the United States, remaining under the same management. Sold in 1960 to Seamist Shipping Corp., New York and renamed Seamist. Sold in 1961 to United Steamship Co., Taipei, China and renamed Yau Lin. Sold in 1965 to Cathay Navigation Corp., Taipei and renamed National Success. Reflagged to Taiwan in 1965. Sold in 1967 to Nationwide Communications Carriers, New York and renamed Good Willie. She was scrapped at Keelung, Taiwan in September 1967.

== William A. Graham ==
William A. Graham was built by North Carolina Shipbuilding Company. Her keel was laid on 1 June 1942. She was launched on 26 July and delivered on 15 August. Laid up at Mobile post-war, she was scrapped at Panama City, Florida in September 1972.

== William A. Henry ==
William A. Henry was built by Oregon Shipbuilding Corporation. Her keel was laid on 29 November 1943. She was launched on 14 December and delivered on 31 December. She was scrapped at Mobile in 1960.

== William A. Jones ==
William A. Jones was built by Permanente Metals Corporation. Her keel was laid on 13 March 1943. She was launched on 18 April and delivered on 5 May. Laid up in the James River post-war, she was scrapped at Bilbao, Spain in June 1971.

== William Allen White ==
William Allen White was built by Permanente Metals Corporation. Her keel was laid on 20 April 1944. She was launched on 8 May and delivered on 16 May. Built for the WSA, she was operated under the management of Pope & Talbot Inc. Management transferred to Pacific-Atlantic Steamship Co. in 1946, then returned to Pope & Talbot Inc. in 1950. Sold in 1951 to Tak Shipping Corp. and renamed Transpacific. Operated under the management of Palmer Shipping Corp. Management transferred to Boise Griffin Agencies Co. in 1953. Sold in 1959 to Alaska Steamship Co. and renamed Talkeetna. Converted to carry containers. Sold in 1967 to Amicus Carriers, New York and renamed Amicus. She was scrapped at Kaohsiung in February 1969.

== William A. Richardson ==
William A. Richardson was built by Marinship Corporation, Sausalito, California. Her keel was laid on 27 June 1942. She was launched on 26 September and delivered on 31 October. She was scrapped at Panama City, Florida in October 1969.

== William Asa Carter ==
William Asa Carter was built by Todd Houston Shipbuilding Corporation. Her keel was laid on 22 November 1944. She was launched on 30 December and delivered on 10 January 1945. She was scrapped at Panama City, Florida in December 1961.

== William B. Allison ==
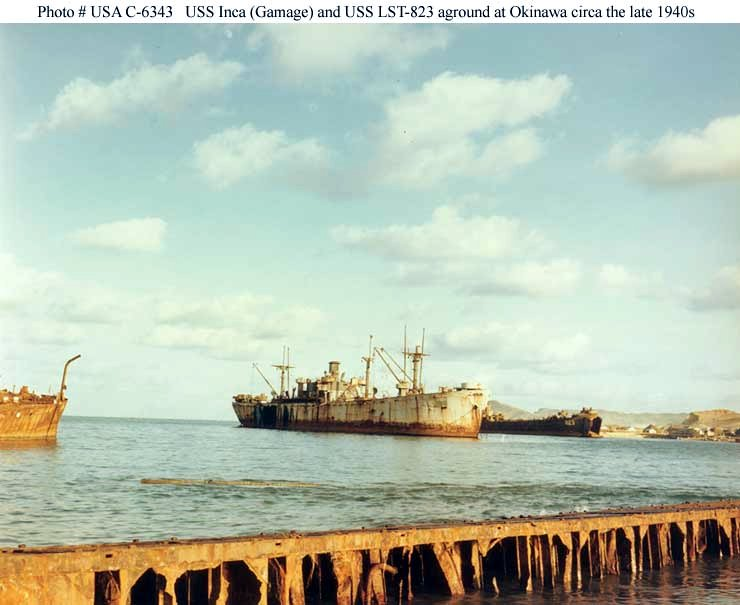
USS Gamage and USS LST-823 aground at Okinawa, Japan in the late 1940s.

William B. Allison was built by California Shipbuilding Corporation. Her keel was laid on 8 February 1943. She was launched on 8 March and delivered on 24 March. Built for the WSA, she was operated under the management of Waterman Steamship Corp. She was torpedoed and damaged by Japanese aircraft in Nakagusuku Bay on 25 May 1945. She was towed in to Nakagusuku, where she was declared a constructive total loss. To the United States Navy on 30 July and renamed Gamage. Used as a storeship at Ulithi, Caroline Islands. Officially returned to the WSA in February 1946 and renamed William B. Allison. Sold in February 1948 to China Merchants & Engineers Inc. Reported scrapped in 1949.

== William B. Bankhead ==
William B. Bankhead was a tanker built by Delta Shipbuilding Company. Her keel was laid on 5 October 1943. She was launched on 15 November and delivered on 24 December. To the United States Navy and renamed Leopard. She was returned to the WSA in June 1946 and renamed William B. Bankhead. Sold in 1948 to Manning Bros., New York and renamed Yankee Fighter. Converted to a cargo ship at Staten Island, New York in 1949. Renamed Fighter in 1951. Sold in 1955 to Carreto Compania Navigation, Panama and renamed Carreto. Reflagged to Liberia and operated under the management of United Tankers Corp. Management transferred to Mavroleon Bros. in 1958. Sold in 1960 to Ithacamar Compania Navigation, Panama and renamed Zoe. Reflagged to Greece and operated under the management of Sphere Ship Operators. She struck a submerged object off the coast of Brazil (33°30′S 72°27′W on 14 July 1965 whilst on a voyage from Chimbote, Peru to the Rio Grande. She arrived at the Rio Grande on 17 July and was declared a constructive total loss. She was sold to shipbreakers in Porto Alegre, Brazil.

== William Beaumont ==
William Beaumont was built by Permanente Metals Corporation. Her keel was laid on 31 May 1943. She was launched on 23 June and delivered on 4 July. Laid up at Beaumont post-war, she was scrapped at Port Neches, Texas in June 1971.

== William Becknell ==
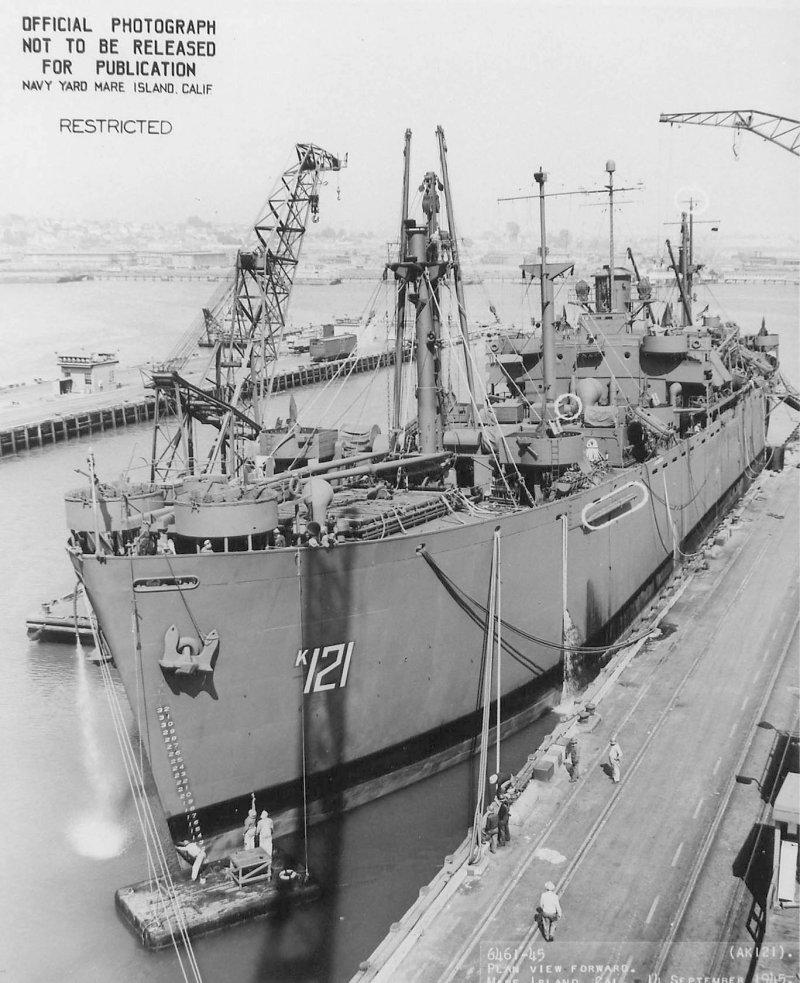
USS Sabik

William Becknell was built by Todd Houston Shipbuilding Corporation. Her keel was laid on 8 November 1943. She was launched on 17 December and delivered on 29 December. To the United States Navy and renamed Sabik. Returned to the WSA in June 1946 and renamed William Becknell. Laid up at Beaumont. She was scrapped at Oakland in November 1961.

== William Bevan ==
William Bevan was built by New England Shipbuilding Corporation. Her keel was laid on 18 December 1944. She was launched on 21 February 1945 and delivered on 28 February. Laid up in the James River post-war, she was scrapped at Philadelphia in February 1971.

== William B. Giles ==
William B. Giles was a limited troop carrier built by Delta Shipbuilding Company. Her keel was laid on 25 April 1942. She was launched on 30 July and delivered on 29 August. Built for the WSA, she was operated under the management of Mississippi Shipping Co. To the French Government in 1946. Operated under the joint management of Compagnie Française de Navigation à Vapeur and Chargeurs Réunis. Renamed Boulogne-sur-Mer in 1947. Sold in 1966 to Charles Auguste Audibert, Monaco and renamed Boulogne, remaining under the French flag. Sold later that year to Transatlantica de Navigation, Panama. Operated under the management of Industria Armamento. She was scrapped at Kaohsiung in December 1968.

== William Black Yates ==
William Black Yates was built by Southeastern Shipbuilding Corporation, Savannah, Georgia. Her keel was laid on 26 July 1943. She was launched on 27 September and delivered on 7 October. She was sold to shipbreakers in New York in January 1970.

== William Blackstone ==
William Blackstone was built by New England Shipbuilding Corporation. Her keel was laid on 1 September 1943. She was launched as William Blackstone on 19 October and delivered as Samtucky on 30 October. To the Ministry of War Transport (MoWT) under Lend-Lease. Operated under the management of Prince Line Ltd. Returned to USMC in 1948 and officially renamed William Blackstone. Laid up at Mobile as Samtucky. She was scrapped at Panama City, Florida in February 1962.

== William B. Leeds ==
William B. Leeds was built by Permanente Metals Corporation. Her keel was laid on 28 December 1943. She was launched on 16 January 1944 and delivered on 22 January. She was scrapped at Baltimore in 1954.

== William Blount ==
William Blount was built by Delta Shipbuilding Company. Her keel was laid on 14 May 1942. She was launched on 30 August and delivered on 26 September. Laid up at Mobile post-war, she was scrapped at Brownsville in December 1970.

== William B. Ogden ==
William B. Ogden was built by Permanente Metals Corporation. Her keel was laid on 30 January 1943. She was launched on 2 March and delivered on 12 March. She ran aground on the Sacramento Shoal, off Vizagapatam, India on 1 July 1943. She was refloated on 6 July and towed in to Calcutta, where she was repaired. She was scrapped at New Orleans in August 1964.

== William Bradford ==
William Bradford was built by New England Shipbuilding Corporation. Her keel was laid on 17 August 1942. She was launched on 14 November and delivered on 8 December. She was scrapped at Philadelphia in June 1960.

== William Brewster ==
William Brewster was built by New England Shipbuilding Corporation. Her keel was laid on 27 September 1942. She was launched on 8 December and delivered on 31 December. She was scrapped at Kearny in 1963.

== William B. Travis ==
William B. Travis was built by Todd Houston Shipbuilding Corporation. Her keel was laid on 30 December 1941. She was launched on 12 June 1942 and delivered on 22 July. Built for the WSA, she was operated under the management of Lykes Bros. Steamship Company. She was damaged off Bizerta, Tunisia by a mine or torpedo on 12 September 1943 whilst on a voyage from Palermo, Sicily, Italy to Bizerta, Tunisia. She was beached at Bizerta and temporary repairs were made. She then sailed to Mobile for permanent repairs. Laid up post-war, she was scrapped at Panama City, Florida in December 1964.

== William B. Wilson ==
William B. Wilson was a tank transport built by J. A. Jones Construction Company, Panama City. Her keel was laid on 14 September 1943. She was launched on 6 November and delivered on 16 December. Laid up in the James River, she was scrapped at Kearny in March 1972.

== William B. Woods ==
William B. Woods was built by J. A. Jones Construction Company, Brunswick. Her keel was laid on 21 July 1942. She was launched on 7 April 1943 and delivered on 31 May. Built for the WSA, she was operated under the management of A. H. Bull & Co. She was torpedoed and damaged north east of Palermo (38°45′N 13°50′E) by U-952 on 10 March 1944 whilst on a voyage from Palermo to Naples, Italy. She sank on 15 March.

== William Byrd ==
William Byrd was built by St. Johns River Shipbuilding Company. Her keel was laid on 24 May 1943. She was launched on 20 August and delivered on 5 September. Laid up in the James River post-war, she was sold to shipbreakers in Cleveland, Ohio in February 1973.

== William Carson ==
William Carson was built by California Shipbuilding Corporation. Her keel was laid on 12 March 1943. She was launched on 7 April and delivered on 21 April. Laid up in Puget Sound post-war, she was scrapped at Tacoma in October 1970.

== William C. C. Claiborne ==
William C. C. Claiborne was built by Delta Shipbuilding Company. Her keel was laid on 1 October 1941. She was launched on 28 March 1942 and delivered on 31 May. She was scrapped at Seattle, Washington in 1961.

== William C. Coulter ==
William C. Coulter was built by Permanente Metals Corporation. Her keel was laid on 25 October 1943. She was launched on 19 November and delivered on 29 November. She was scrapped at Oakland in March 1965.

== William C. Endicott ==
William C. Endicott was built by Permanente Metals Corporation. Her keel was laid on 31 October 1942. She was launched on 9 December and delivered on 17 December. She was scrapped at Portland, Oregon in January 1965.

== William C. Gorgas ==
William C. Gorgas was built by Alabama Drydock Company. She was delivered in January 1943. She was torpedoed in the Atlantic Ocean (51°35′N 28°30′W) by U-444 on 10 March 1943 whilst on a voyage from Mobile to Liverpool, United Kingdom and was abandoned. She was torpedoed and sunk the next day by German submarine U-757.

== William C. Lane ==
William C. Lane was built by Oregon Shipbuilding Corporation. Her keel was laid on 23 June 1943. She was launched as William C. Lane on 13 July and delivered as Sampler on 20 July. To the MoWT under Lend-Lease. Operated under the management of Port Line Ltd, London. Sold to her managers in 1947 and renamed Fort Albany. Sold in 1951 to Compania Navigation Vista Darada, Panama and renamed Teni. Operated under the management of Capeside Steamship Co. Sold in 1953 to Mid-Atlantic Shipping Corp. and renamed Gloriana. Reflagged to Liberia and operated under the management of J. Livanos & Sons. Reflagged to Greece in 1959. Management transferred to General Maritime Agency in 1960. She was scrapped at Shanghai in September 1968.

== William Clark ==
William Clark was built by Oregon Shipbuilding Corporation. Her keel was laid on 31 May 1941. She was launched on 26 October and delivered on 3 February 1942. Built for the WSA, she was operated under the management of Isthmian Steamship Company. She was torpedoed and sunk in the Greenland Sea (71°05′N 13°10′W by U-354 on 4 November 1942 whilst on a voyage from a port in Iceland to Murmansk.

== William Coddington ==
William Coddington was built by Walsh-Kaiser Company, Providence, Rhode Island. Her keel was laid on 27 June 1942. She was launched on 27 November and delivered on 13 February 1943. She was scrapped at Portland, Oregon in March 1967.

== William Cox ==
William Cox was built by J. A. Jones Construction Company, Brunswick. Her keel was laid on 4 December 1944. She was launched on 30 December and delivered on 10 January 1945. Built for the WSA, she was operated under the management of Blidberg Rothchild Company. She was scrapped at Wilmington, North Carolina in 1968.

== William C. Ralston ==
William C. Ralston was built by Permanente Metals Corporation. Her keel was laid on 31 October 1943. She was launched on 26 November and delivered on 10 December. She ran aground off Okinawa in a typhoon on 10 December 1945 and was declared a constructive total loss. Subsequently returned to the United States and laid up. She was scuttled off the coast of California with a cargo of obsolete chemical ammunition on 15 April 1958.

== William Crane Gray ==
William Crane Gray was built by St. Johns River Shipbuilding Company. Her keel was laid on 23 May 1944. She was launched on 12 July and delivered on 27 July. Laid up a Beaumont post-war, she was scrapped at Brownsville in August 1972.

== William Crompton ==
William Crompton was a tanker built by Delta Shipbuilding Company. Her keel was laid on 6 August 1943. She was launched on 23 September and delivered on 17 November. Built for the WSA, she was operated under the management of Keystone Shipping Corp. Sold in 1948 to Stockard Steamship Corp. and renamed Caribstar. Sold in 1950 to Colonial Steamship Corp. and renamed Seadream. Operated under the management of Orion Shipping & Trading Co. Sold in 1952 to Calobre Compania Navigation and renamed Livadia. Reflagged to Panama, remaining under the same management. Converted to a cargo ship at Schiedam, Netherlands in 1954. Sold in 1955 to Compania Comercial Transatlantica and renamed Theonymphos. Operated under the management of Spiros Polemis & Sons. She was scrapped at La Spezia, Italy in April 1969.

== William Cullen Bryant ==
William Cullen Bryant was built by Oregon Shipbuilding Corporation. Her keel was laid on 16 February 1942. She was launched on 7 April and delivered on 7 May. Built for the WSA, she was operated under the management of James Griffiths & Sons. She was torpedoed and damaged in the Atlantic Ocean 40 nautical miles (74 km) off Key West, Florida by U-84 on 21 July 1942 whilst on a voyage from Hawaii to Philadelphia. She was towed in to Philadelphia, and then to New York for repairs, returning to service in March 1944. Laid up in reserve post-war, she was scrapped at Philadelphia in March 1963.

== William Cushing ==
William Cushing was built by Permanente Metals Corporation. Her keel was laid on 30 August 1942. She was launched on 7 October and delivered on 27 October. She was scrapped at Philadelphia in August 1969.

== William Dawes ==
William Dawes was built by Oregon Shipbuilding Corporation. Her keel was laid on 26 October 1941. She was launched on 7 February 1942 and delivered on 1 April. Built for the WSA, she was operated under the management of Weyerhaeuser Steamship Co. She was torpedoed and sunk south of Sydney, Australia (35°45′S 150°20′E) by I-11 on 21 July 1942 whilst on a voyage from San Francisco to Brisbane, Australia.

== William D. Bloxham ==
William D. Bloxham was built by J. A. Jones Construction Company, Panama City. Her keel was laid on 5 May 1944. She was launched on 13 June and delivered on 28 June. Built for the WSA, she was operated under the management of W. J. Rountree & Co. Sold in 1947 to Lloyd Triestino, Trieste, Italy and renamed Sistiana. Sold in 1963 to Oceanica Transports Co., Malta and renamed Soclyve. Reflagged to the United Kingdom and operated under the management of Union Maritime & Shipping Co. Sold in 1969 to Polarus Shipping Co., Famagusta, Cyprus and renamed Mitera Irini. She was scrapped at Split, Yugoslavia in June 1972.

== William D. Boyce ==
William D. Boyce was built by Permanente Metals Corporation. Her keel was laid on 31 December 1943. She was launched on 19 January 1944 and delivered on 26 January. Built for the WSA, she was operated under the management of Pacific-Atlantic Steamship Co. Sold in 1947 to Navigazione Alta Italia, Genoa and renamed Monrosa. Sold in 1963 to Sovtorgflot, Odessa, Soviet Union and renamed Malakhov Kurga. She was scrapped at Split in September 1971.

== William D. Burnham ==
William D. Burnham was built by Permanente Metals Corporation. Her keel was laid on 24 July 1943. She was launched on 14 August and delivered on 26 August. Built for the WSA, she was operated under the management of American-Hawaiian Steamship Company. She was damaged by a mine or torpedo in the English Channel on 23 November 1944 whilst on a voyage from the St. Helen's Roads to Cherbourg, France and was beached at Cherbourg. She was refloated on 5 January 1945 and towed to Falmouth, United Kingdom, where she was declared a constructive total loss. She was towed to Antwerp, Belgium on 17 July 1948 and was scrapped there.

== William D. Byron ==
William D. Byron was built by Bethlehem Fairfield Shipyard. Her keel was laid on 1 January 1944. She was launched on 2 February and delivered on 15 February. She struck a mine off the Italian coast on 15 August 1944 and was towed to Savona. Declared a constructive total loss, she was scrapped there in June 1948.

== William Dean Howells ==
William Dean Howells was built by Permanente Metals Corporation. Her keel was laid on 28 June 1942. She was launched on 29 August and delivered on 29 September. She was scrapped at Baltimore in May 1960.

== William De Witt Hyde ==
William De Witt Hyde was built by New England Shipbuilding Corporation. Her keel was laid on 19 August 1943. She was as William De Witt Hyde on 31 August and delivered as Hellas on 17 September. To the Greek Government under Lend-Lease. Sold in 1947 to George C. Lemos, Chios. On 8 March 1953, she participated in the search for survivors from the Egyptian minesweeper Sollum, which had foundered 12 nautical miles (22 km) off Alexandria. She was scrapped at Hirao, Japan in November 1968.

== William D. Hoard ==
William D. Hoard was built by Oregon Shipbuilding Corporation. Her keel was laid on 11 October 1943. She was launched on 30 October and delivered in 8 November. Built for the WSA, she was operated under the management of Isthmian Steamship Company. Sold in 1947 to Panaghis D. Marchessini and renamed Eurymedon. Reflagged to Greece. Sold later that year to Compania de Navigation San Salvador. operated under the management of Atlas Trading Corp. and reflagged to Panama. Management transferred to Petmar Agencies Inc. in 1950. Sold in 1956 to D. P. Dracos and renamed Panagiotis D. Reflagged to Greece and operated under the management of Jason Shipping & Trading Corp. Management transferred to Victoria Steamship Co. in 1960. Sold in 1963 to Chrisanthemon Compania Naviera, Panama and renamed Katina T. H.. Remaining under the Greek flag and operated under the management of Orient Mid-East Ltd. She was scrapped at Kaohsiung in March 1968.

== William D. Hoxie ==
William D. Hoxie was built by Southeastern Shipbuilding Corporation. Her keel was laid on 23 February 1944. She was launched on 14 April and delivered on 29 April. Laid up in Puget Sound post-was, she was scrapped at Tacoma in September 1970.

== William D. Moseley ==
William D. Moseley was built by North Carolina Shipbuilding Company. Her keel was laid on 23 February 1944. She was launched on 14 April and delivered on 29 April. She was scrapped at Panama City, Florida in May 1962.

== William D. Pender ==
William D. Pender was built by North Carolina Shipbuilding Company. She was completed in March 1943. She was scrapped at Baltimore in February 1960.

== William Dunbar ==
William Dunbar was built by California Shipbuilding Corporation. Her keel was laid on 5 January 1943. She was launched on 2 February and delivered on 19 February. Built for the WSA, she was operated under the management of South Atlantic Steamship Line. Sold in July 1947 to Skibs A/S Oiltank 3, Tønsberg and renamed Florentine. Operated under the management of Reidar Rød. She sank in the Pacific Ocean (22°04′N 140°30′E) on 20 February 1951 whilst on a voyage from Manila, Philippines to San Francisco. Twenty-one of her 33 crew were rescued by the Victory ship Silvermaple. The other twelve were rescued from a lifeboat on 25 February by the tug USS Tekelma.

== William Eaton ==
William Eaton was built by California Shipbuilding Corporation. Her keel was laid on 9 October 1942. She was launched on 7 November and delivered on 26 November. She was driven ashore at Toshima (34°34′N 139°15′E) on 13 April 1952 whilst on a voyage from Otaru, Japan to Pusan, South Korea. She broke in two on 26 April and was a total loss.

== William E. Borah ==
William E. Borah was built by Oregon Shipbuilding Corporation. Her keel was laid on 2 December 1942. She was launched on 27 December and delivered on 3 January 1943. She was scrapped at Hirao in July 1961.

== William E. Dodd ==
William E. Dodd was built by J. A. Jones Construction Company, Panama City. Her keel was laid on 19 May 1944. She was launched on 22 June and delivered on 15 July. Built for the WSA, she was operated under the management of South Atlantic Steamship Line. Sold in 1947 to Skips A/S Skytteren, Tønsberg and renamed Milbank. Operated under the management of Yngvar Hvistendahl. Sold in 1957 to S7A Skytteren and S/A Matros, Tønsberg, remaining under the same management. Sold in 1958 to Seabird Steamship Inc. and renamed Thanksgiving. Reflagged to Liberia. She arrived at Hirao for scrapping on 15 February 1967.

== William Ellery ==
William Ellery was built by Permanente Metals Corporation. Her keel was laid on 9 February 1942. She was launched on 9 May and delivered on 28 May. Built for the WSA, she was operated under the management of McCormick Steamship Company. She was scrapped at New Orleans in September 1968.

== William Ellery Channing ==
William Ellery Channing was built by California Shipbuilding Corporation. Her keel was laid on 21 July 1942. She was launched on 27 August and delivered on 15 September. She was scrapped at Portland, Oregon in October 1969.

== William E. Pendleton ==
William E. Pendleton was a tanker built by Delta Shipbuilding Company. Her keel was laid on 11 July 1943. She was launched on 1 September and delivered on 25 October. Built for the WSA, she was operated under the management of Barber Ashphalt Corp. Sold in 1948 to Paco Tankers Inc. and renamed Natico. Operated under the management of Keystone Shipping Co. Sold in 1954 to Theatre Navigation Corp. and renamed Casino. Reflagged to Liberia and operated under the management of Rector Shipping Co. Sold in 1955 to San Rafael Compania Navigation, Panama and renamed Amalias. Remaining under the Liberian flag and operated under the management of Orion Shipping & Trading Co. Converted to a cargo ship at Amsterdam, Netherlands. She was lengthened to 511 feet 6 inches (155.91 m) at Maizuro, Japan in 1956. Now 8,531 GRT. Renamed Andros Valley in 1957. Sold in 1960 to Ocean Traders Marine Corp. and renamed Corinthiakos. Reflagged to Greece, remaining under the same management. Sold in 1964 to Aurora Compania Navigation, Panama and renamed Georgios P. Reflagged to Liberia and operated under the management of Phoenix Maritime Agencies. Sold in 1968 to Pacific Coast Shipping Co. Remaining under the Liberian flag and operated under the management of Lasco Shipping Co. She ran aground at Toshima, Japan on 4 April 1969 whilst on a voyage from Kure, Japan to Portland, Oregon and was a total loss. The wreck was sold for scrap "as lies".

== William E. Ritter ==
William E. Ritter was built by Permanente Metals Corporation. Her keel was laid on 14 April 1944. She was launched as William E. Ritter on 3 May and delivered as Briansk II on 11 May. To the Soviet Union under Lend-Lease. Renamed Briansk II in 1944, then Briansk in 1967 and Bryansk in 1969. She arrived at Vladivostock for scrapping on 25 July 1975.

== William Eustis ==
William Eustis was built by Todd Houston Shipbuilding Corporation. Her keel was laid on 23 November 1942. She was launched on 21 January 1943 and delivered on 31 January. Built for the WSA, she was operated under the management of United Fruit Company. She was torpedoed and damaged in the Atlantic Ocean (50°38′N 34°46′W) by U-435 on 17 March 1943 whilst on a voyage from New York to Liverpool. She was shelled and depth charged by a Royal Navy warship, but did not sink. She was torpedoed and sunk by U-91 later that day.

== William F. Cody ==
William F. Cody was built by California Shipbuilding Corporation. Her keel was laid on 14 June 1942. She was launched on 26 July and delivered on 15 August. She was scrapped at Tacoma in May 1967.

== William F. Empey ==
William F. Empey was built by Permanente Metals Corporation. Her keel was laid on 26 October 1943. She was launched on 13 November and delivered on 21 November. Built for the WSA, she was operated under the management of American-Hawaiian Steamship Company. Sold in 1947 to Lloyd Triestino and renamed Portorose. Sold in 1964 to Fratellia d'Amico, Rome, Italy. She was scrapped at Trieste in July 1968.

== William Few ==
William Few was a limited troop carrier built by Bethlehem Fairfield Shipyard. Her keel was laid on 14 July 1942. She was launched on 28 August and delivered on 10 September. Built for the WSA, she was operated under the management of Merchants & Miners Transportation Co. Sold in 1947 to Compagnia International de Vapores, Panama and renamed Norlandia. Reflagged to Honduras and operated under the management of Simpson, Spence & Young. Management transferred to North American Shipping & Trading Co. in 1948. Sold in 1950 to Silet Compania de Vapores, Panama, remaining under the same flag and management. Management transferred to Marine Agencies Inc. in 1954, then International Navigation Co. in 1957. Reflagged to Greece in 1961, then Panama in 1967. She was scrapped at Osaka, Japan in February 1969.

== William F. Jerman ==
William F. Jerman was built by J. A. Jones Construction Company, Brunswick. Her keel was laid on 27 November 1944. She was launched on 23 December and delivered on 31 December. Built for the WSA, she was operated under the management of Black Diamond Steamship Company. She was scrapped at Baltimore in June 1960.

== William Floyd ==
William Floyd was built by California Shipbuilding Corporation. Her keel was laid on 22 December 1941. She was launched on 8 April and delivered on 23 May. Laid up at Beaumont post-war, she was scrapped at Brownsville in January 1971.

== William F. MacLennan ==
William F. MacLennan was built by California Shipbuilding Company. Her keel was laid on 20 May 1943. She was launched on 12 June and delivered on 23 June. She was scrapped at Baltimore in June 1963.

== William Ford Nichols ==
William Ford Nichols was built by Permanente Metals Corporation. Her keel was laid on 8 December 1943. She was launched on 28 December and delivered on 5 January 1944. Laid up in the James River post-war, she arrived at Gandia for scrapping in January 1973.

== William F. Vilas ==
William F. Vilas was built by Permanented Metals Corporation. Her keel was laid on 6 July 1943. She was launched as William F. Vilas on 31 July and completed as Samana on 12 August. To the MoWT under Lend-Lease. Operated under the management of Lamport & Holt Line. To USMC in 1947 and renamed William F. Vilas. Laid up in the James River as Samana. She was scrapped at Philadelphia in October 1949.

== William Gaston ==
William Gaston was built by North Carolina Shipbuilding Company. Her keel was laid on 23 May 1942. She was launched on 19 July and delivered on 5 August. Built for the WSA, she was operated under the management of American West African Lines. She was torpedoed and sunk in the Atlantic Ocean (26°42′S 46°12′W) by U-861 on 26 July 1944 whilst on a voyage from Rosario, Argentina to Rio de Janeiro, Brazil.

== William G. Fargo ==
William G. Fargo was built by was built by California Shipbuilding Corporation. Her keel was laid on 2 March 1943. She was launched on 29 March and delivered on 12 April. Built for the WSA, she was operated under the management of General Steamship Corp. To the Dutch Government in 1947 and renamed Jacob Cats. Operated under the management of Scheepsvaart-en Steenkolen Maatschappij. Sold in 1949 to Montaan Transport N.V., Den Haag. Sold in 1950 to Victores Shipping Corp. and renamed Agioi Victores. Reflagged to Liberia and operated under the management of Boyd, Weir & Sewell. Management transferred to Pateras Sons Ltd. in 1955. Sold in 1960 to Viafama Compania Navigation, Panama and renamed Effie II. Remaining under the Liberian flag and operated under the management of Coral Shipping. Renamed Ayios Dimitris in 1962. Reflagged to Greece and operated under the management of Good Hope Shipping Ltd. Sold in 1965 to Taiwan International Inc., Taipei and renamed Kuo Fu. Reflagged to Taiwan. Sold in 1965 to Thai Chong Marine Inc., Taipei and renamed Thai Hsing, remaining under the Taiwanese flag. She was scrapped at Kaohsiung in 1967.

== William Glackens ==
William Glackens was built by California Shipbuilding Corporation. Her keel was laid on 10 December 1943. She was launched on 2 January 1944 and delivered on 19 January. Built for the WSA, she was operated under the management of Isthmian Steamship Company. Management transferred to Coastwise Line in 1946, then American Pacific Steamship Co. in 1947, then American Far East Line in 1949. She was laid up at Bombay, India in 1950 after losing her propeller. Sold in 1951 to Global Tramp Inc., New York and renamed Ocean Skipper. Sold in 1955 to White Star Maritime Co. and renamed White Star. Reflagged to Liberia and operated under the management of S. Livanos Ltd. Sold in 1963 to Peggy Navigation, Panama and renamed Loyal Allies. Remaining under the Liberian flag and operated under the management of China Maritime Investment Co. She was scrapped at Kaohsiung in February 1967.

== William G. Lee ==
William G. Lee was built by Southeastern Shipbuilding Corporation. Her keel was laid on 24 April 1944. She was launched on 15 June and delivered on 30 June. Built for the WSA, she was operated under the management of South Atlantic Steamship Line. Sold in 1949 to Dorian Steamship Co., New York and renamed Dorian Prince. Sold later that year to Alaska Steamship Co., Seattle and renamed Nadina. She was converted to a container ship in 1964. She was scrapped in Japan in 1970.

== William G. McAdoo ==
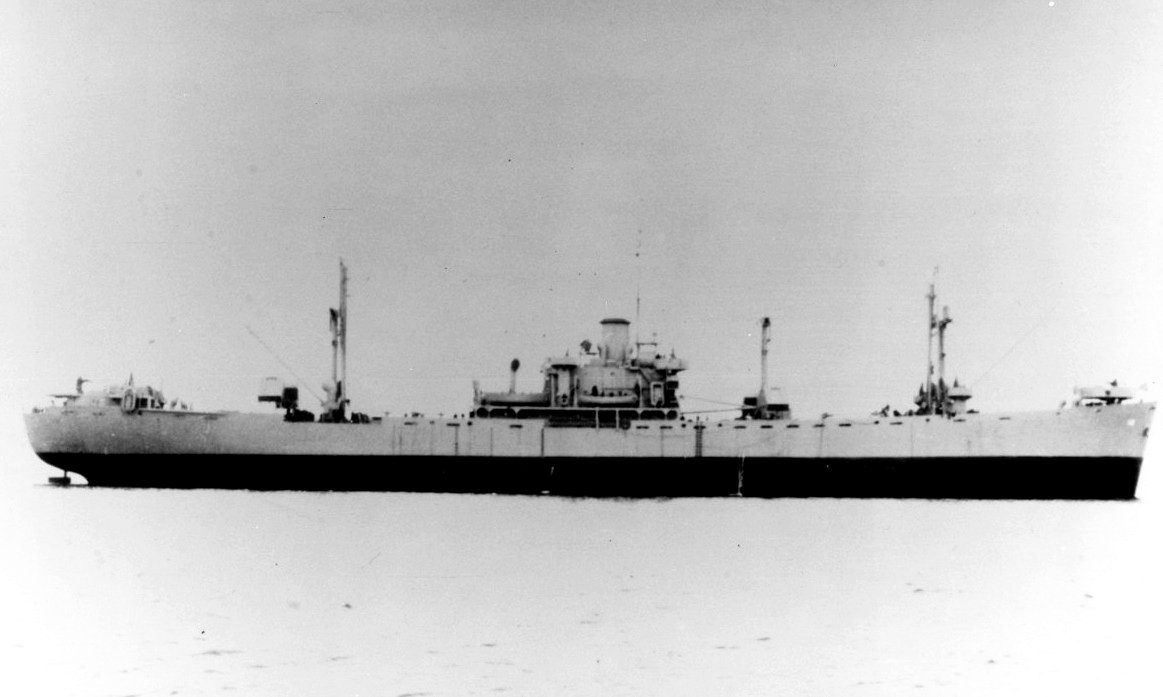
USS Grumium

William G. McAdoo was built by Permanente Metals Corporation. Her keel was laid on 12 November 1942. She was launched on 20 December and delivered on 30 December. To the United States Navy in October 1943 and renamed Grumium. Converted for naval use by Todd Shipyards, Seattle. She was returned to the WSA in December 1945 and renamed William G. McAdoo. Laid up in the James River. She was scrapped at Barcelona in July 1970.

== William Grayson ==
William Grayson was built by Bethlehem Fairfield Shipyard. Her keel was laid on 16 July 1942. She was launched on 31 August and delivered on 14 September. Built for the WSA, she was operated under the management of Black Diamond Steamship Company. To the Greek Government in 1946 and renamed Kerkyra. Sold in 1946 to Condylis Bros. Operated under the management of Orion Steamship Co. Renamed Anna L. Condylis in 1947. Management transferred to Orion Shipping & Trading Co. in 1953. Sold in 1955 to D. L. Condylis. Operated under the management of Sea Traffic & Trading Corp. Sold in 1957 to Lamyra Shipping Co. and renamed Alexandros. Remaining under the same flag and management. Sold in 1962 to Preveza Shipping Co. and renamed Theonymphos Tinou. Reflagged to Lebanon and operated under the management of Tsakalotos Navigation Corp. She was scrapped at Kaohsiung in June 1968.

== William G. Sumner ==
William G. Sumner was built by St. Johns River Shipbuilding Company. Her keel was laid on 13 September 1943. She was launched on 8 November and delivered on 19 November. To the United States Navy and renamed Alkaid. Returned to the WSA in March 1946 and renamed William G. Sumner. Laid up in Suisun Bay, she was scrapped at Terminal Island in April 1964.

== William G. T'Vault ==
William G. T'Vault was built by Oregon Shipbuilding Corporation. Her keel was laid on 16 April 1943. She was launched as William G. T'Vault on 5 May and delivered as Kuban on 13 May. To the Soviet Union. Reported scrapped in 1971 and deleted from shipping registers in 1981/82.
