= Pierre L'Enfant (disambiguation) =

Pierre Charles L'Enfant is the son of Pierre L'Enfant and designer of modern-day Washington, D.C.

Pierre L'Enfant may also refer to:

- Pierre L'Enfant (painter) (1704–1787), French painter and father of the above
- SS Pierre L'Enfant, a U.S. Liberty ship, named after Pierre L'Enfant the designer of modern-day Washington, D.C.
