= USS Lancaster (AK-193) =

Cargo ship of the United States Navy

History

United States
- Name: Coastal Ringleader (1944–1945); Lancaster (1945)
- Namesake: Lancaster County, Pennsylvania
- Ordered: as type (C1-M-AV1) hull, MC hull 2124
- Builder: Walter Butler Shipbuilders Inc., Superior, Wisconsin
- Yard number: 42
- Laid down: 1 July 1944
- Launched: 15 December 1944
- Acquired: 21 September 1945
- Commissioned: 21 September 1945
- Decommissioned: 23 November 1945
- Stricken: date unknown
- Identification: Hull symbol: AK-193; Code letters: NEOE
- Fate: Returned to Maritime Commission, 23 November 1945

United States
- Name: Coastal Ringleader
- Owner: Maritime Commission
- Operator: Polarus SS Company (1945); New York and Puerto Rico SS Company (1946); United Fruit Company (1948)
- Acquired: 23 November 1945
- In service: 23 November 1945
- Out of service: 25 May 1948
- Fate: Sold, 13 July 1956

Brazil
- Name: Coastal Ringleader
- Operator: Companhia Nacional de Navegacao Costerira, Patrimonio Nacional
- Acquired: 13 July 1956
- In service: 2 October 1956
- Fate: Hulked 1975, deleted 1992

General characteristics
- Class & type: Alamosa-class cargo ship
- Type: C1-M-AV1
- Tonnage: 5,032 long tons deadweight (DWT)
- Displacement: 2,382 long tons (2,420 t) (standard); 7,450 long tons (7,570 t) (full load)
- Length: 388 ft 8 in (118.47 m)
- Beam: 50 ft (15 m)
- Draft: 21 ft 1 in (6.43 m)
- Installed power: 1 × Nordberg, TSM 6 diesel engine; 1,750 shp (1,300 kW)
- Propulsion: 1 × propeller
- Speed: 11.5 kn (21.3 km/h; 13.2 mph)
- Capacity: 3,945 t (3,883 long tons) DWT; 9,830 cu ft (278 m^{3}) (refrigerated); 227,730 cu ft (6,449 m^{3}) (non-refrigerated)
- Complement: 15 Officers; 70 Enlisted
- Armament: 1 × 3 in (76 mm)/50-caliber dual-purpose gun (DP); 6 × 20 mm (0.8 in) Oerlikon anti-aircraft (AA) cannons

USS Lancaster (AK-193) was an Alamosa-class cargo ship that was constructed by the US Navy during the closing period of World War II. She was declared excess-to-needs and returned to the US Maritime Commission shortly after commissioning.

== Construction ==
The fourth ship to be so named by the Navy, Lancaster was laid down under a Maritime Commission contract, MC hull 2124, 1 July 1944, by Walter Butler Shipbuilding Inc., Superior, Wisconsin; launched the same year; acquired by the Navy 21 September 1945; and commissioned the same day.

== Post-war decommissioning ==
The end of World War II reduced the need for cargo ships, and Lancaster decommissioned 23 November 1945, she was returned to the War Shipping Administration the same day with her name reverting to Coastal Ringleader.

== Merchant service ==
Coastal Ringleader was used by several shipping companies from 1945 to 1948, when she was placed in the reserve fleet.

On 13 July 1956, she was sold to Companhia Nacional de Navegacao Costerira, Patrimonio Nacional, of Brazil, for $693,682, under the condition that she be used for coastal shipping. She was delivered on 2 October 1956.

== Notes ==
Citations

== Bibliography ==
Online resources

- "Lancaster III (AK-193)". Dictionary of American Naval Fighting Ships. Naval History and Heritage Command. 28 July 2015. This article incorporates text from this source, which is in the public domain.
- "C1 Cargo Ships". www.ShipbuildingHistory.com. 28 August 2009.
- "USS Lancaster (AK-193)". NavSource. 24 June 2011.
- "Coastal Ringleader". United States Department of Transportation. Archived from the original on November 4, 2016.
