= USS New Hanover =

Cargo ship of the United States Navy

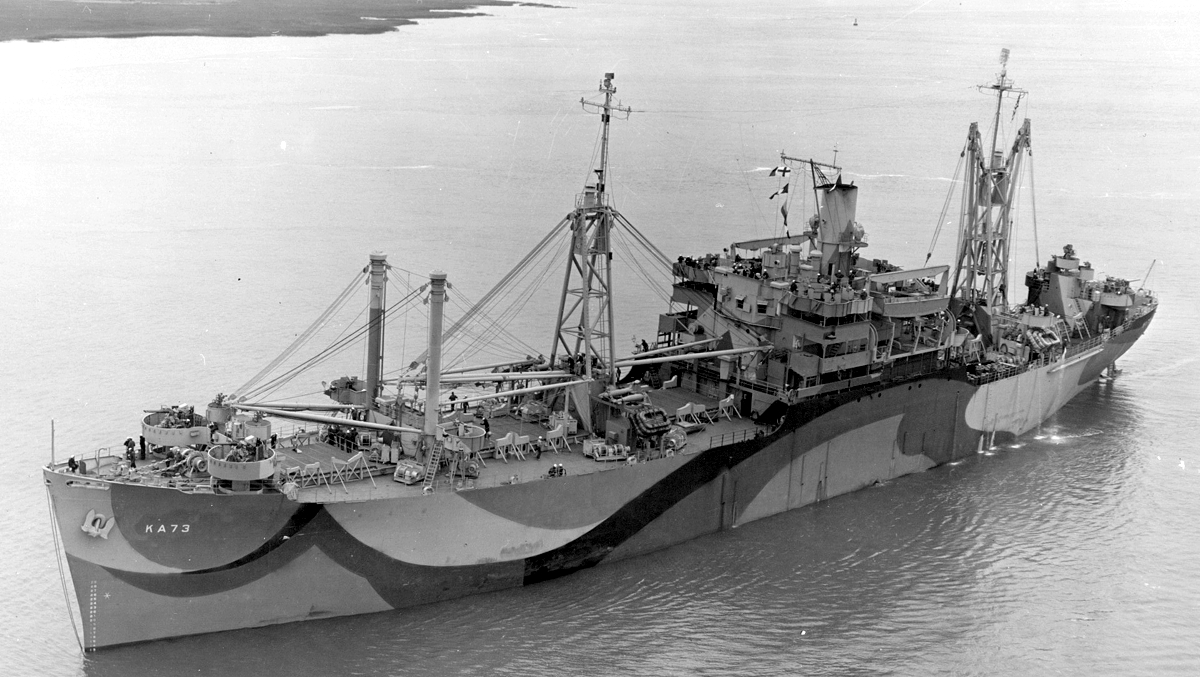

History

United States
- Name: USS New Hanover
- Namesake: New Hanover County, North Carolina
- Builder: North Carolina Shipbuilding Company, Wilmington, North Carolina
- Laid down: 31 August 1944
- Launched: 31 October 1944
- Commissioned: 22 December 1944
- Decommissioned: 30 July 1946
- Renamed: SS Alawai; SS Franklin Berwis; SS Santa Mercedes; SS Green Wave; SS Sagamore Hill
- Stricken: 15 August 1946
- Honors and awards: 1 battle star (World War II)
- Fate: Sold into merchant service 31 June 1947; Sold for scrapping 16 October 1970

General characteristics
- Class & type: Tolland-class attack cargo ship
- Displacement: 6,318 long tons (6,419 t)
- Length: 459 ft 2 in (139.95 m)
- Beam: 63 ft (19 m)
- Draft: 26 ft 4 in (8.03 m)
- Propulsion: GE geared turbine drive, single propeller, 6,000 hp (4.5 MW)
- Speed: 16.5 knots (30.6 km/h; 19.0 mph)
- Complement: 365
- Armament: 1 × 5"/38 caliber gun; 4 × twin 40 mm guns; 16 × 20 mm guns

USS New Hanover (AKA-73) was a Tolland-class attack cargo ship in service with the United States Navy from 1944 to 1946. She was sold into commercial service and was scrapped in 1970.

== History ==
New Hanover was named after New Hanover County, North Carolina. She was laid down as a Type C2-S-AJ3 ship on 31 August 1944 by the North Carolina Shipbuilding Co., Wilmington, North Carolina; launched on 31 October 1944; sponsored by Mrs. O. M. Creekmore; and commissioned on 22 December 1944 at Charleston, South Carolina.

=== World War II, 1944–1945 ===
After training in Chesapeake Bay, New Hanover cleared Norfolk on 24 January 1945 with cargo for the Pacific, sailing through the Panama Canal on 1 February and reaching Pearl Harbor on 19 February. Joining Amphibious Forces, Pacific Fleet, she began a round of cargo operations which took her to the Solomons, New Hebrides, and Ulithi, all in preparation for the assault on Okinawa, off which she arrived on 10 April. During the next week of cargo operations, her crew went to General Quarters 30 times as Japanese air attacks harassed the invasion. She returned to Ulithi on 23 April and began a series of passages with mail, cargo, and passengers to Guam, the Russells, Eniwetok, and Saipan, serving the bases essential to Pacific victory. She carried passengers to San Francisco in July, then continued cargo and passenger operations which took her to Pearl Harbor, Tinian, Saipan, the Philippines, and ultimately Japan, from which she returned to Pearl Harbor on 27 November with passengers and a cargo composed largely of captured Japanese equipment. She sailed for the Canal Zone on 29 November, bound for the East Coast.

=== Decommissioning and Sale ===
After service on the Atlantic coast she decommissioned at Norfolk on 30 July 1946. Transferred to the United States Maritime Commission on 31 July 1946 she was struck from the Naval Vessel Register on 15 August 1946.

=== Civilian Service and fate ===
Ex-USS New Hanover was sold 31 June 1947 to the Waterman Steamship Corporation, and renamed SS Alawai. She was resold in February 1955 to Polarus Steamship Company and renamed SS Franklin Berwis. After two years service she was resold again, this time to Grace Line, Inc in February 1957 and renamed SS Santa Mercedes. Grace sold the ship to Central Gulf Steamship Corporation on 22 April 1960 and they renamed her SS Green Wave. Sold once more in July 1966 to Victory Carriers, Inc. she was renamed for the last time to SS Sagamore Hill. On 16 October 1970, the old AKA met her end, being sold for scrap to Li Chong Steel & Iron Works of Taiwan.
