= Polarus Steamship Company =

Former US shipping company

- Industry: Shipping
- Founded: 1918 in New York City, United States
- Key people: Tikhon N. Agapeyeff; Carlos M. Fetterolf; Hendrik Robert Jolles; G. H. Christensen; Hendrick L. Busch (from 1932 to 1955)

Polarus Steamship Company was founded in 1918, and again in 1923 in New York City by Tikhon Nicholas Agapeyeff (1891–1931). Tikhon N. Agapeyeff's 1918 firm, operated for only about two years. In March 1921, Agapeyeff sold the first Polarus Steamship Company to the C. M. Fetterolf Company for $250,000. The next incorporation in 1923 was a partnership of Agapeyeff, Marcel Levy, and Charles S. Dunaif. Marcel Levy was an attorney and Charles S. Dunaif was an exporter.

Agapeyeff was born on July 21, 1891, in Russia to a military family of hereditary nobles. Agapeyeff was a commander of a ship in the Russian Imperial Navy and spoke 7 languages. Agapeyeff additionally served as a Naval Attaché to the Imperial Guard, and he received the Cross of Saint George for his brave service in WWI. At the outbreak of the Russian Revolution in 1917, he fled to Liverpool, England and briefly lived in London. On June 25, 1917, Russian Naval Attaché rear-admiral N. Wolkoff provided him with a document granting him permission to proceed to the United States of America “on a special mission”. On June 30, 1917, he proceeded to New York City, aboard the SS Saint Paul, accompanied by his fellow Naval officers, Prince Dimitry Galitzine and Wadim Makaroff. In February 1918, the Bolshevik government’s ambassador, Boris Bahkmeteff, repeatedly appealed to the United States to arrest Agapeyeff and return him to Russia to be court marshaled; while federal agents did locate him and disclose his location to the ambassador, the Undersecretary of State, Frank Polk, declined to turn him over to Russian authorities.

Agapeyeff found work at a United States Navy Ordnance Depot during World War I. Post-war Agapeyeff was a ship broker and started the first Polarus Shipping Company in 1918 with Agapeyeff as president and Carlos M. Fetterolf as vice president. Agapeyeff sold the firm on August 1, 1921, to C. M. Fetterolf Company.

In the 1923 incorporation of Polarus Steamship Company, Hendrik Robert Jolles (1889–1949) was president and Dunaif vice president. On July 12, 1923, Apapeyeff became a naturalized citizen of the United States. On December 4, 1931, while visiting his timber business in Halifax, Nova Scotia, Canada, with his wife, actress and socialite Violet Lobell (1901–1975); daughter, Barbara (1926–2005); mother-in-law, Lily Lobell; and business partner, Charles Dumaif, Apapeyeff passed away suddenly at age 40 after a presumed cardiac event.

For 10 years Agapeyeff was also the managing director of the Sonora Timber Company. The Sonora Timber Company, of Sonora, Nova Scotia, was founded to log and export pulpwood to the United States.

== World War II ==
Polarus Steamship Company fleet of ships were used to help the World War II effort. During World War II Polarus Steamship Company operated Merchant navy ships for the United States Shipping Board. During World War II Polarus Steamship Company was active with charter shipping with the Maritime Commission and War Shipping Administration. Polarus Steamship Company operated Liberty ships and Victory ships for the merchant navy. The ship was run by its Polarus Steamship Company crew and the US Navy supplied United States Navy Armed Guards to man the deck guns and radio.

== Ships ==
  - Post war Liberty ships, war surplus:
- SS Coastal Ringleader
- Michael J. Owens
- William D. Bloxham, acquired in 1969 renamed Mitera Irini
- SS Telfair Stockton, acquired in 1956 renamed Transporter
- Patrick B. Whalen, acquired in 1953 renamed Charles C. Dunaif
- Joseph I. Kemp, acquired in 1956 renamed Adolph Sperling
- SS Jasper F. Cropsey, acquired in 1949 renamed Ocenanic
- John M. Morehead, acquired in 1949 renamed Polarus Sailor
- William R. Lewis, acquired in 1950 renamed Polaruse Carrier
- Lafcadio Hearn, acquired in 1948 renamed Polarussoil
- Francis A. Retka, acquired in 1956 renamed I. R. Lashings

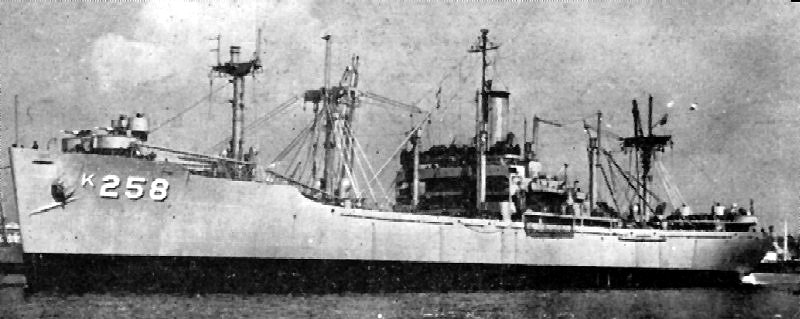
A Victory ship of World War II

Liberty ship of World War II

  - other
- SS Franklin Berwis
- SS Coastal Guide
  - Liberty ships operated for World War II:
- SS Charles H. Marshall
- SS Michael de Kovats
- SS Pierre L'Enfant
- SS Waigstill Avery
- SS William D. Bloxham
- SS Charles A. Draper
- SS Ora Ellis
- Patrick B. Whalen
- Earl Layman
- Michael J. Owens
- Earl Layman
- Charles G. Coutant
- Joseph B. Eastman
- John McDonogh
- Raymond V. Ingersoll
- Michael J. Owens
- Augustin Stahl
- James B. Hickok

  - Victory ships operated:
- Fayetteville Victor
- Parkersburg Victory

== See also ==
- World War II United States Merchant Navy
