= SS Michael de Kovats =

Liberty ship of WWII

History

United States
- Name: Michael de Kovats
- Namesake: Michael de Kovats
- Owner: War Shipping Administration (WSA)
- Operator: Polarus Steamship Co.
- Ordered: as type (EC2-S-C1) hull, MC hull 2495
- Awarded: 23 April 1943
- Builder: St. Johns River Shipbuilding Company, Jacksonville, Florida
- Cost: $997,746
- Yard number: 59
- Way number: 5
- Laid down: 9 August 1944
- Launched: 16 September 1944
- Sponsored by: Mrs. James R.P. Bell, Jr.
- Completed: 27 September 1944
- Identification: Call sign: KSTJ
- Fate: Laid up in the National Defense Reserve Fleet, Mobile, Alabama, 2 June 1948; Sold for scrapping, 22 February 1972, withdrawn from fleet, 6 March 1972

General characteristics
- Class & type: Liberty ship; type EC2-S-C1, standard
- Tonnage: 10,865 LT DWT; 7,176 GRT
- Displacement: 3,380 long tons (3,434 t) (light); 14,245 long tons (14,474 t) (max)
- Length: 441 feet 6 inches (135 m) oa; 416 feet (127 m) pp; 427 feet (130 m) lwl
- Beam: 57 feet (17 m)
- Draft: 27 ft 9.25 in (8.4646 m)
- Installed power: 2 × Oil fired 450 °F (232 °C) boilers, operating at 220 psi (1,500 kPa); 2,500 hp (1,900 kW)
- Propulsion: 1 × triple-expansion steam engine, (manufactured by General Machinery Corp., Hamilton, Ohio); 1 × screw propeller
- Speed: 11.5 knots (21.3 km/h; 13.2 mph)
- Capacity: 562,608 cubic feet (15,931 m^{3}) (grain); 499,573 cubic feet (14,146 m^{3}) (bale)
- Complement: 38–62 USMM; 21–40 USNAG
- Armament: Varied by ship; Bow-mounted 3-inch (76 mm)/50-caliber gun; Stern-mounted 4-inch (102 mm)/50-caliber gun; 2–8 × single 20-millimeter (0.79 in) Oerlikon anti-aircraft (AA) cannons and/or, 2–8 × 37-millimeter (1.46 in) M1 AA guns

SS Michael de Kovats was a Liberty ship built in the United States during World War II. She was named after Michael de Kovats, a Hungarian nobleman and cavalry officer who served in the Continental Army during the American Revolutionary War, in which he was killed in action. General Casimir Pulaski and Kovats are together known as the "Founding Fathers of the US Cavalry."

== Construction ==
Michael de Kovats was laid down on 8 August 1944, under a Maritime Commission (MARCOM) contract, MC hull 2495, by the St. Johns River Shipbuilding Company, Jacksonville, Florida; she was sponsored by Mrs. Daniels Brierley, the wife of the director of the division of maintenance and repairs MARCOM, Washington, DC, and was launched on 16 September 1944.

== History ==
She was allocated to the Polarus Steamship Co., on 27 September 1944. On 2 June 1948, she was laid up in the National Defense Reserve Fleet, Mobile, Alabama. She was sold for scrapping, 22 February 1972, to Pinto Island Metals Co., for $37,500. She was removed from the fleet, 6 March 1972.

== Bibliography ==
- "St. John's River Shipbuilding, Jacksonville FL". www.ShipbuildingHistory.com. 16 October 2010.
- Maritime Administration. "Michael de Kovats". Ship History Database Vessel Status Card. U.S. Department of Transportation, Maritime Administration.
- Davies, James (May 2004). "Specifications (As-Built)" (PDF). p. 23.
- "SS Michael de Kovats".
