= SS Telfair Stockton =

Liberty ship of WWII

History

United States
- Name: Telfair Stockton
- Namesake: Telfair Stockton
- Owner: War Shipping Administration (WSA)
- Operator: R.A. Nichol & Company
- Ordered: as type (EC2-S-C1) hull, MC hull 2507
- Awarded: 23 April 1943
- Builder: St. Johns River Shipbuilding Company, Jacksonville, Florida
- Cost: $920.238,
- Yard number: 71
- Way number: 5
- Laid down: 24 October 1944
- Launched: 23 November 1944
- Completed: 30 November 1944
- Identification: Call sign: ANBS
- Fate: Laid up in the, National Defense Reserve Fleet, Suisun Bay, California, 30 April 1946; Sold for commercial use, 24 April 1947, removed from fleet, 29 May 1947

United States
- Name: Telfair Stockton (1947-1949); Eugenie (1949-1956); Transporter (1956)
- Owner: Oro Navigation Co.
- Operator: General Steamship Corp.
- Fate: Sold, February 1956

Liberia
- Name: Transporter
- Owner: Sea Freighter Corp. (1956-1959); Jackson Steamship Co. (1959-1967)
- Operator: Polarus Steamship Co. (1956-1957); Cargo Ships & Tankers Inc. (1957-1959); Suwannee Steamship Co. (1959-1967)
- Refit: 8,636 GRT
- Fate: Sold, 1967

Liberia
- Name: Zaneta II
- Owner: Arger Navigation, Ltd.
- Operator: Atlantic Shipping Co.
- Fate: Sold, 1968

Liberia
- Name: Sfakia
- Owner: Ivory Coast Transport Co.
- Operator: Commodity Chartering Corp.
- Fate: Scrapped, 1973

General characteristics
- Class & type: Liberty ship; type EC2-S-C1, standard
- Tonnage: 10,865 LT DWT; 7,176 GRT
- Displacement: 3,380 long tons (3,434 t) (light); 14,245 long tons (14,474 t) (max)
- Length: 441 feet 6 inches (135 m) oa; 416 feet (127 m) pp; 427 feet (130 m) lwl
- Beam: 57 feet (17 m)
- Draft: 27 ft 9.25 in (8.4646 m)
- Installed power: 2 × Oil fired 450 °F (232 °C) boilers, operating at 220 psi (1,500 kPa); 2,500 hp (1,900 kW)
- Propulsion: 1 × triple-expansion steam engine, (manufactured by General Machinery Corp., Hamilton, Ohio); 1 × screw propeller
- Speed: 11.5 knots (21.3 km/h; 13.2 mph)
- Capacity: 562,608 cubic feet (15,931 m^{3}) (grain); 499,573 cubic feet (14,146 m^{3}) (bale)
- Complement: 38–62 USMM; 21–40 USNAG
- Armament: Varied by ship; Bow-mounted 3-inch (76 mm)/50-caliber gun; Stern-mounted 4-inch (102 mm)/50-caliber gun; 2–8 × single 20-millimeter (0.79 in) Oerlikon anti-aircraft (AA) cannons and/or, 2–8 × 37-millimeter (1.46 in) M1 AA guns

SS Telfair Stockton was a Liberty ship built in the United States during World War II. She was named after Telfair Stockton, an American entrepreneur and developer in Jacksonville, Florida.

== Construction ==
Telfair Stockton was laid down on 24 October 1944, under a Maritime Commission (MARCOM) contract, MC hull 2507, by the St. Johns River Shipbuilding Company, Jacksonville, Florida; and was launched on 23 November 1944.

== History ==
She was allocated to the R.A. Nichol & Company, on 30 November 1944. On 30 April 1946, she was laid up in the National Defense Reserve Fleet, Suisun Bay, California. She was sold for commercial use, 24 April 1947, to Oro Navigation Co. She was withdrawn from the fleet, 29 May 1947

== Bibliography ==
- "St. John's River Shipbuilding, Jacksonville FL". www.ShipbuildingHistory.com. 16 October 2010.
- Maritime Administration. "Harald Torsvik". Ship History Database Vessel Status Card. U.S. Department of Transportation, Maritime Administration.
- Davies, James (May 2004). "Specifications (As-Built)" (PDF). p. 23.
- "SS Telfair Stockton".
