= SS Ora Ellis =

Liberty ship of WWII

History

United States
- Name: Ora Ellis
- Namesake: Ora Ellis
- Owner: War Shipping Administration (WSA)
- Operator: Polarus Steamship Co., Inc.
- Ordered: as type (EC2-S-C5) hull, MC hull 3148
- Builder: J.A. Jones Construction, Panama City, Florida
- Cost: $853,227
- Yard number: 108
- Way number: 6
- Laid down: 23 July 1945
- Launched: 26 September 1945
- Completed: 16 October 1945
- Identification: Call sign: AOJA
- Fate: Laid up in the, National Defense Reserve Fleet, Mobile, Alabama, 3 January 1947; Sold for commercial use, 8 August 1947

United States
- Name: Coral Sea
- Owner: Coral Steamship Corp.
- Fate: Sold, January 1951

United States
- Name: Sea Coral
- Owner: Orion Shipping and Trading Co.
- Fate: Sold, January 1954

Liberia
- Name: Seacoral; Andro Coral
- Owner: Coral Cia. Armadora
- Renamed: 1957
- Fate: Grounded and sank, 18 May 1960

General characteristics
- Class & type: Liberty ship; type EC2-S-C5, boxed aircraft transport
- Tonnage: 10,600 LT DWT; 7,200 GRT
- Displacement: 3,380 long tons (3,434 t) (light); 14,245 long tons (14,474 t) (max)
- Length: 441 feet 6 inches (135 m) oa; 416 feet (127 m) pp; 427 feet (130 m) lwl
- Beam: 57 feet (17 m)
- Draft: 27 ft 9.25 in (8.4646 m)
- Installed power: 2 × Oil fired 450 °F (232 °C) boilers, operating at 220 psi (1,500 kPa); 2,500 hp (1,900 kW)
- Propulsion: 1 × triple-expansion steam engine, (manufactured by Filer and Stowell, Milwaukee, Wisconsin); 1 × screw propeller
- Speed: 11.5 knots (21.3 km/h; 13.2 mph)
- Capacity: 490,000 cubic feet (13,875 m^{3}) (bale)
- Complement: 38–62 USMM; 21–40 USNAG
- Armament: Varied by ship; Bow-mounted 3-inch (76 mm)/50-caliber gun; Stern-mounted 4-inch (102 mm)/50-caliber gun; 2–8 × single 20-millimeter (0.79 in) Oerlikon anti-aircraft (AA) cannons and/or, 2–8 × 37-millimeter (1.46 in) M1 AA guns

SS Ora Ellis was a Liberty ship built in the United States during World War II. She was named after Ora Ellis, a Merchant marine killed when U-506 torpedoed SS William C. McTarnahan, 35 mi (56 km) east of Ship Shoal Light, Louisiana, 16 May 1942.

== Construction ==
Ora Ellis was laid down on 23 July 1945, under a Maritime Commission (MARCOM) contract, MC hull 3148, by J.A. Jones Construction, Panama City, Florida; she was launched on 26 September 1945.

== History ==
She was allocated to Polarus Steamship Co., Inc., on 16 October 1945. On 3 January 1947, she was laid up in the, National Defense Reserve Fleet, Mobile, Alabama. She was sold, on 8 August 1947, to Coral Steamship Corp., for commercial use and renamed Coral Sea. On 18 May 1960, after having been sold to Coral Cia. Armmadora, renamed Andros Coral, and flagged in Liberia, she sank for a total loss when she was grounded in the Chacao Channel, Chile.

== Bibliography ==
- "Jones Construction, Panama City FL". www.ShipbuildingHistory.com. 13 October 2010.
- Maritime Administration. "Ora Ellis". Ship History Database Vessel Status Card. U.S. Department of Transportation, Maritime Administration.
- Davies, James (May 2004). "Specifications (As-Built)" (PDF). p. 23.
- "SS Ora Ellis".
- "THE PEOPLE BEHIND THE NAMES". Armed-guard.com.
- "William C. McTarnahan". UBoat.net.
