= SS William Few =

Liberty ship of WWII

History

United States
- Name: William Few
- Namesake: William Few
- Owner: War Shipping Administration (WSA)
- Operator: Merchant & Miners Transportation Co.
- Ordered: as type (EC2-S-C1) hull, MCE hull 309
- Awarded: 1 May 1941
- Builder: Bethlehem-Fairfield Shipyard, Baltimore, Maryland
- Cost: $1,071,549
- Yard number: 2059
- Way number: 5
- Laid down: 14 July 1942
- Launched: 28 August 1942
- Sponsored by: Mrs. Frank Egan
- Completed: 10 September 1942
- Identification: Call sign: KHHJ
- Fate: Sold for commercial use, 30 December 1946

Honduras
- Name: Norlandia
- Owner: Compañia Navegacion de Vapores (1947—1950); Silet Compañia de Vapores (1950—)
- Operator: Simpson, Spence & Young (1947); North American Shipping & Trading Co. (1947—1954); International Navigation Co.
- Fate: reflagged 1961

Greece
- Name: Norlandia
- Owner: Silet Compañia de Vapores
- Fate: reflagged 1967

Panama
- Name: Norlandia
- Owner: Silet Compañia de Vapores
- Fate: Scrapped, 1969

General characteristics
- Class & type: Liberty ship; type EC2-S-C1, standard
- Tonnage: 10,865 LT DWT; 7,176 GRT
- Displacement: 3,380 long tons (3,434 t) (light); 14,245 long tons (14,474 t) (max)
- Length: 441 feet 6 inches (135 m) oa; 416 feet (127 m) pp; 427 feet (130 m) lwl
- Beam: 57 feet (17 m)
- Draft: 27 ft 9.25 in (8.4646 m)
- Installed power: 2 × Oil fired 450 °F (232 °C) boilers, operating at 220 psi (1,500 kPa); 2,500 hp (1,900 kW)
- Propulsion: 1 × triple-expansion steam engine, (manufactured by Ellicott Machine Corp., Baltimore, Maryland); 1 × screw propeller
- Speed: 11.5 knots (21.3 km/h; 13.2 mph)
- Capacity: 562,608 cubic feet (15,931 m^{3}) (grain); 499,573 cubic feet (14,146 m^{3}) (bale)
- Complement: 38–62 USMM; 21–40 USNAG
- Armament: Varied by ship; Bow-mounted 3-inch (76 mm)/50-caliber gun; Stern-mounted 4-inch (102 mm)/50-caliber gun; 2–8 × single 20-millimeter (0.79 in) Oerlikon anti-aircraft (AA) cannons and/or, 2–8 × 37-millimeter (1.46 in) M1 AA guns

SS William Few was a Liberty ship built in the United States during World War II. She was named after William Few, an American politician, farmer, businessman, and a Founding Father of the United States. Few represented the US state of Georgia at the Constitutional Convention and signed the United States Constitution. Few, along with James Gunn, were the first senators from Georgia.

== Construction ==
William Few was laid down on 14 July 1942, under a Maritime Commission (MARCOM) contract, MCE hull 309, by the Bethlehem-Fairfield Shipyard, Baltimore, Maryland. She was sponsored by Mrs. Frank Egan, the daughter of J. Kirkpatrick, the chief hull inspector for MARCOM, in Philadelphia, and was launched on 28 August 1942.

== History ==
She was allocated to Merchant & Miners Transportation Co., on 10 September 1942. On 30 December 1946, she was sold for commercial use to Compañia Navegacion de Vapores, for $544,506. She was scrapped in Osaka in 1969.
