= SS William Grayson =

Liberty ship of WWII

History

United States
- Name: William Grayson
- Namesake: William Grayson
- Owner: War Shipping Administration (WSA)
- Operator: Black Diamond Steamship Co.
- Ordered: as type (EC2-S-C1) hull, MCE hull 310
- Awarded: 1 May 1941
- Builder: Bethlehem-Fairfield Shipyard, Baltimore, Maryland
- Cost: $1,065,106
- Yard number: 2060
- Way number: 3
- Laid down: 16 July 1942
- Launched: 31 August 1942
- Sponsored by: Mrs. Albert W. Kabernagel
- Completed: 14 September 1942
- Identification: Call sign: KHGD
- Fate: Transferred to Greece, 18 May 1945

Greece
- Name: Kerkyra
- Owner: Greece
- Fate: Returned to the Maritime Commission (MARCOM), 13 November 1945; Sold for commercial use, 18 December 1946

Greece
- Name: Kerkyra (1946—1947); Anna L. Condylis (1947—1957)
- Owner: Condylis Bros. (1946—1955); D. L. Condylis (1955—1957)
- Operator: Orion Steamship Co. (1946—1955); Sea Traffic & Trading Corp. (1955—1957)
- Fate: Sold, 1957

Greece
- Name: Alexandros
- Owner: Lamyra Shipping Co.
- Operator: Sea Traffic & Trading Corp.
- Fate: Sold, 1962

Lebanon
- Name: Theonymphos Tinou
- Owner: Preveza Shipping Co.
- Operator: Tsakalotos Navigation Corp.
- Fate: Scrapped, 1968

General characteristics
- Class & type: Liberty ship; type EC2-S-C1, standard
- Tonnage: 10,865 LT DWT; 7,176 GRT
- Displacement: 3,380 long tons (3,434 t) (light); 14,245 long tons (14,474 t) (max)
- Length: 441 feet 6 inches (135 m) oa; 416 feet (127 m) pp; 427 feet (130 m) lwl
- Beam: 57 feet (17 m)
- Draft: 27 ft 9.25 in (8.4646 m)
- Installed power: 2 × Oil fired 450 °F (232 °C) boilers, operating at 220 psi (1,500 kPa); 2,500 hp (1,900 kW)
- Propulsion: 1 × triple-expansion steam engine, (manufactured by General Machinery Corp., Hamilton, Ohio); 1 × screw propeller
- Speed: 11.5 knots (21.3 km/h; 13.2 mph)
- Capacity: 562,608 cubic feet (15,931 m^{3}) (grain); 499,573 cubic feet (14,146 m^{3}) (bale)
- Complement: 38–62 USMM; 21–40 USNAG
- Armament: Varied by ship; Bow-mounted 3-inch (76 mm)/50-caliber gun; Stern-mounted 4-inch (102 mm)/50-caliber gun; 2–8 × single 20-millimeter (0.79 in) Oerlikon anti-aircraft (AA) cannons and/or, 2–8 × 37-millimeter (1.46 in) M1 AA guns

SS William Grayson was a Liberty ship built in the United States during World War II. She was named after William Grayson, a soldier, lawyer, and statesman from Virginia. Grayson was a delegate to the Confederation Congress from 1785 to 1787. He helped to pass the Northwest Ordinance, including a provision that forbade slavery in the Northwest Territory. He was one of the first two US Senators from Virginia, and belonged to the Anti-Federalist faction, he was also the first member of the United States Congress to die while holding office.

== Construction ==
William Grayson was laid down on 16 July 1942, under a Maritime Commission (MARCOM) contract, MCE hull 310, by the Bethlehem-Fairfield Shipyard, Baltimore, Maryland; she was sponsored by Mrs. Albert W. Kabernagel, the wife of the chief inspector at Bethlehem-Fairfield Shipyard, and was launched on 31 August 1942.

== History ==
She was allocated to Black Diamond Steamship Co., on 14 September 1942. On 18 May 1945, she was transferred to Greece, and renamed Kerkyra. She was returned to MARCOM on 13 November 1946. On 18 December 1946, she was sold for commercial use to Condylis Bros., for $544,506, and renamed Anna L. Condylis. She was scrapped in Taiwan, in 1968.

== World War II Convoys ==
During World War II, William Grayson participated in no fewer than 32 convoys supplying the war effort. The list below, sorted chronologically, most likely represents the complete list of convoys that include William Grayson, but does not represent an exhaustive search.

- Convoy GZ.9 (Oct 1942: Guantanamo - Cristobal)
- Convoy NG.313 (Oct 1942: NYC - Guantanamo)
- Convoy CA.1 (Dec 1942: Cape Town - Dispersed)
- Convoy DC.21 (Apr 1943: Durban - Cape Town)
- Convoy PA.32 (Apr 1943: Bandar abbas - Aden)
- Convoy BT.14 (May 1943: Bahia - Trinidad)
- Convoy CN.19 (May 1943: Cape Town - Dispersed)
- Convoy TAG.66 (Jun 1943: Trinidad - Guantanamo)
- Convoy GN.66 (Jun 1943: Guantanamo - NYC)
- Convoy UGS.13 (Jul 1943: Hampton Roads - Port Said)
- Convoy AP.43 (Aug 1943: Aden - Bandar Abbas)
- Convoy GUS.20 (Oct 1943: Alexandria - Hampton Roads)
- Convoy PA.56 (Oct 1943: Bandar abbas - Aden)
- Convoy HX.272 (Dec 1943: NYC - Liverpool)
- Convoy WP.SP 16 (Jan 1944: Milford Haven - Portsmouth)
- Convoy PW.467 (Jan 1944: Portsmouth - M haven)
- Convoy ON.223 (Feb 1944: Liverpool - NYC)
- Convoy HX.283 (Mar 1944: NYC - Liverpool)

After leaving New York City, William Grayson was involved in a collision that damaged her hull. William Grayson made way for St. John's, Newfoundland for repairs. Following repairs, William Grayson returned to port.

- Convoy UGS.51 (Aug 1944: Hampton Roads - Port Said)
- Convoy GUS.51 (Sep 1944: Port Said - Hampton Roads)
- Convoy KN.342 (Oct 1944: Key West - NYC)
- Convoy HX.319 (Nov 1944: NYC - Liverpool)
- Convoy WVC.16 (Dec 1944: St helens rds - Havre)
- Convoy ON.280 (Jan 1945: Southend - NYC)
- Convoy TBC.43 (Jan 1945: Southend - Milford Haven)
- Convoy BX.149 (Mar 1945: Boston - Halifax)
- Convoy HX.343 (Mar 1945: NYC - Liverpool)
- Convoy TAM.119 (Mar 1945: Southend - Antwerp)
- Convoy ATM.130 (Apr 1945: Antwerp - Southend)
- Convoy ON.298 (Apr 1945: Southend - NYC)

== Bibliography ==
- "Bethlehem-Fairfield, Baltimore MD". www.ShipbuildingHistory.com. 14 August 2008.
- Maritime Administration. "William Grayson". Ship History Database Vessel Status Card. U.S. Department of Transportation, Maritime Administration.
- Davies, James (May 2004). "Specifications (As-Built)" (PDF). p. 23.
- "SS William Grayson".
- "Arnold Hague Convoy Database". convoyweb.org.uk.
- "Convoy HX 283 - warsailors.com". www.warsailors.com.
