= SS Walter W. Schwenk =

Liberty ship of WWII

History

United States
- Name: Walter W. Schwenk
- Namesake: Walter W. Schwenk
- Owner: War Shipping Administration (WSA)
- Operator: United States Lines Co.
- Ordered: as type (EC2-S-C5) hull, MC hull 3144
- Builder: J.A. Jones Construction, Panama City, Florida
- Cost: $876,300
- Yard number: 104
- Way number: 6
- Laid down: 9 June 1945
- Launched: 21 July 1945
- Completed: 22 August 1945
- Identification: Call sign: AOFF
- Fate: Placed in the Suisun Bay Reserve Fleet, Suisun Bay, California, 24 August 1946; Laid up in the, National Defense Reserve Fleet, Mobile, Alabama, 10 August 1949; Sold for scrapping, 22 February 1972, removed from fleet, 3 March 1972

General characteristics
- Class & type: Liberty ship; type EC2-S-C5, boxed aircraft transport
- Tonnage: 10,600 LT DWT; 7,200 GRT
- Displacement: 3,380 long tons (3,434 t) (light); 14,245 long tons (14,474 t) (max)
- Length: 441 feet 6 inches (135 m) oa; 416 feet (127 m) pp; 427 feet (130 m) lwl
- Beam: 57 feet (17 m)
- Draft: 27 ft 9.25 in (8.4646 m)
- Installed power: 2 × Oil fired 450 °F (232 °C) boilers, operating at 220 psi (1,500 kPa); 2,500 hp (1,900 kW)
- Propulsion: 1 × triple-expansion steam engine, (manufactured by Filer and Stowell, Milwaukee, Wisconsin); 1 × screw propeller
- Speed: 11.5 knots (21.3 km/h; 13.2 mph)
- Capacity: 490,000 cubic feet (13,875 m^{3}) (bale)
- Complement: 38–62 USMM; 21–40 USNAG
- Armament: Varied by ship; Bow-mounted 3-inch (76 mm)/50-caliber gun; Stern-mounted 4-inch (102 mm)/50-caliber gun; 2–8 × single 20-millimeter (0.79 in) Oerlikon anti-aircraft (AA) cannons and/or, 2–8 × 37-millimeter (1.46 in) M1 AA guns

SS Walter W. Schwenk was a Liberty ship built in the United States during World War II. She was named after Walter W. Schwenk, a World War I Navy veteran. Before World War II Schwenk worked with Blake Line, Consolidated Navigation Corporation, and Southgate–Nelson Corporation. In 1940, he joined the US Maritime Commission (MARCOM), and later the War Shipping Administration (WSA), February 1942. On 15 April 1944, he was appointed the Atlantic Coast director of the WSA, responsible for all cargo and ship movement on the East Coast.

== Construction ==
Walter W. Schwenk was laid down on 9 June 1945, under a Maritime Commission (MARCOM) contract, MC hull 3144, by J.A. Jones Construction, Panama City, Florida; she was launched on 21 July 1945.

== History ==
She was allocated to United States Lines Co., 22 August 1945. On 24 August 1946, she was placed in the Suisun Bay Reserve Fleet, Suisun Bay, California. On 10 August 1949, she was laid up in the National Defense Reserve Fleet, Mobile, Alabama. She was sold for scrapping, 22 February 1972, to Pinto Island Metals Co., for $36,500. She was withdrawn from the fleet, 3 March 1972.

== Bibliography ==
- "Jones Construction, Panama City FL". www.ShipbuildingHistory.com. 13 October 2010.
- Maritime Administration. "Walter W. Schwenk". Ship History Database Vessel Status Card. U.S. Department of Transportation, Maritime Administration.
- Davies, James (May 2004). "Specifications (As-Built)" (PDF). p. 23.
- "SS Walter W. Schwenk".
- "Walter W. Schwenk". The Herald Statesman. Yonkers, New York. 13 March 1945.
