= SS William D. Bloxham =

World War II Liberty ship of the United States

History

United States
- Name: William D. Bloxham
- Namesake: William D. Bloxham
- Owner: War Shipping Administration (WSA)
- Operator: William J. Rountree & Company
- Ordered: as type (EC2-S-C1) hull, MC hull 2306
- Builder: J.A. Jones Construction, Panama City, Florida
- Cost: $951,652
- Yard number: 47
- Way number: 2
- Laid down: 5 May 1944
- Launched: 13 June 1944
- Sponsored by: Miss Joan Blair
- Completed: 28 June 1944
- Identification: Call Signal: WQZR
- Fate: Sold to Italy, 18 January 1947

Italy
- Name: Sistiana
- Namesake: Sistiana
- Owner: Lloyd Triestino, Trieste, Italy
- Acquired: 30 January 1947
- Fate: Sold, 1963

United Kingdom
- Name: Soclyve
- Owner: Oceanica Transports Co., Malta
- Operator: Union Maritime & Shipping Co., London
- Acquired: 1963
- Fate: Sold, 1969

Cyprus
- Name: Mitera Irini
- Owner: Polarus Shipping Co., Famagusta, Cyprus
- Acquired: 1969
- Fate: Scrapped, 1972

General characteristics
- Class & type: Liberty ship; type EC2-S-C1, standard
- Tonnage: 10,865 LT DWT; 7,176 GRT
- Displacement: 3,380 long tons (3,434 t) (light); 14,245 long tons (14,474 t) (max)
- Length: 441 feet 6 inches (135 m) oa; 416 feet (127 m) pp; 427 feet (130 m) lwl
- Beam: 57 feet (17 m)
- Draft: 27 ft 9.25 in (8.4646 m)
- Installed power: 2 × Oil fired 450 °F (232 °C) boilers, operating at 220 psi (1,500 kPa); 2,500 hp (1,900 kW)
- Propulsion: 1 × triple-expansion steam engine, (manufactured by General Machinery Corp., Hamilton, Ohio); 1 × screw propeller
- Speed: 11.5 knots (21.3 km/h; 13.2 mph)
- Capacity: 562,608 cubic feet (15,931 m^{3}) (grain); 499,573 cubic feet (14,146 m^{3}) (bale)
- Complement: 38–62 USMM; 21–40 USNAG
- Armament: Varied by ship; Bow-mounted 3-inch (76 mm)/50-caliber gun; Stern-mounted 4-inch (102 mm)/50-caliber gun; 2–8 × single 20-millimeter (0.79 in) Oerlikon anti-aircraft (AA) cannons and/or, 2–8 × 37-millimeter (1.46 in) M1 AA guns

SS William D. Bloxham was a Liberty ship built in the United States during World War II. She was named after William D. Bloxham, the Secretary of State of Florida (1877–1880) and the 13th and 17th Governor of Florida (1881–1885 and 1897–1901).

== Construction ==
William D. Bloxham was laid down on 5 May 1944, under a Maritime Commission (MARCOM) contract, MC hull 2306, by J.A. Jones Construction, Panama City, Florida; she was sponsored by Miss Joan Blair, and launched on 13 June 1944.

== History ==
She was allocated to William J. Rountree & Company, on 28 June 1944. On 11 June 1946, she was laid up in the National Defense Reserve Fleet, in the James River Group. On 18 January 1947, she was transferred to the Italian Government, which in turn sold her for $549,813.52 to Lloyd Triestino, Trieste, Italy, for commercial use. She was renamed Sistiana. After being sold to a couple more owners she was scrapped in 1972.

== Bibliography ==
- "Jones Construction, Panama City FL". www.ShipbuildingHistory.com. 13 October 2010.
- "Liberty Ships – World War II".
- Maritime Administration. "William D. Bloxham". Ship History Database Vessel Status Card. U.S. Department of Transportation, Maritime Administration. Archived from the original on 12 December 2019.
- Davies, James (May 2004). "Specifications (As-Built)" (PDF). p. 23.
- "SS William D. Bloxham ".
