= SS Pierre L'Enfant =

Liberty ship of WWII

History

United States
- Name: Pierre L'Enfant
- Namesake: Pierre L'Enfant
- Owner: War Shipping Administration (WSA)
- Operator: Polarus Steamship Co., Inc.
- Ordered: as type (EC2-S-C1) hull, MCE hull 1001
- Awarded: 30 January 1942
- Builder: Bethlehem-Fairfield Shipyard, Baltimore, Maryland
- Cost: $1,002,961
- Yard number: 2151
- Way number: 11
- Laid down: 17 May 1943
- Launched: 11 June 1943
- Sponsored by: Mrs. O. M. White
- Completed: 28 June 1943
- Identification: Call sign: KHLY
- Fate: Sold for commercial use, 27 November 1946

Panama
- Name: Atlantic Wave
- Owner: Atlantic Maritime Co. (1946—1953); Atlantic Freighters, Ltd. (1953—1961)
- Operator: Boyd, Weir & Sewell (1946—1952); Maritime Brokers, Inc. (1952—1953); Livanos Ltd. (1953—1961)
- Fate: Sold, 1961

Yugoslavia
- Name: Miljet
- Owner: Atlanska Plovidba Dubrovnik
- Operator: Anglo-Yugoslav Shipping Corp.
- Fate: Sold, 1965

Yugoslavia
- Name: Kolasin
- Owner: Prekookeanska Plovidba, Bar.
- Operator: Anglo-Yugoslav Shipping Corp.
- Fate: Grounded near Tuapse, 27 January 1970

General characteristics
- Class & type: Liberty ship; type EC2-S-C1, standard
- Tonnage: 10,865 LT DWT; 7,176 GRT
- Displacement: 3,380 long tons (3,434 t) (light); 14,245 long tons (14,474 t) (max)
- Length: 441 feet 6 inches (135 m) oa; 416 feet (127 m) pp; 427 feet (130 m) lwl
- Beam: 57 feet (17 m)
- Draft: 27 ft 9.25 in (8.4646 m)
- Installed power: 2 × Oil fired 450 °F (232 °C) boilers, operating at 220 psi (1,500 kPa); 2,500 hp (1,900 kW)
- Propulsion: 1 × triple-expansion steam engine, (manufactured by General Machinery Corp., Hamilton, Ohio); 1 × screw propeller
- Speed: 11.5 knots (21.3 km/h; 13.2 mph)
- Capacity: 562,608 cubic feet (15,931 m^{3}) (grain); 499,573 cubic feet (14,146 m^{3}) (bale)
- Complement: 38–62 USMM; 21–40 USNAG
- Armament: Varied by ship; Bow-mounted 3-inch (76 mm)/50-caliber gun; Stern-mounted 4-inch (102 mm)/50-caliber gun; 2–8 × single 20-millimeter (0.79 in) Oerlikon anti-aircraft (AA) cannons and/or, 2–8 × 37-millimeter (1.46 in) M1 AA guns

SS Pierre L'Enfant was a Liberty ship built in the United States during World War II. She was named after Pierre L'Enfant, a French-American military engineer who designed the basic plan for Washington, D.C., known today as the L'Enfant Plan.

== Construction ==
Pierre L'Enfant was laid down on 17 May 1943, under a Maritime Commission (MARCOM) contract, MCE hull 1001, by the Bethlehem-Fairfield Shipyard, Baltimore, Maryland; she was sponsored by Mrs. O. M. White, the wife of a yard employee, and was launched on 11 June 1943.

== History ==
She was allocated to Polarus Steamship Co., Inc., on 28 June 1943. On 27 November 1946, she was sold for commercial use to Atlantic Maritime Co., for $544,506. After several owner and name changes, sailing as Kolasin, she was grounded near Tuapse, on the Black Sea, and declared a Total Loss.

== Bibliography ==
- "Bethlehem-Fairfield, Baltimore MD". www.ShipbuildingHistory.com. 14 August 2008.
- Maritime Administration. "Pierre L'Enfant". Ship History Database Vessel Status Card. U.S. Department of Transportation, Maritime Administration.
- Davies, James (May 2004). "Specifications (As-Built)" (PDF). p. 23.
- "SS Pierre L'Enfant".
