= SS William Byrd =

Liberty ship of WWII

History

United States
- Name: William Byrd
- Namesake: William Byrd II
- Owner: War Shipping Administration (WSA)
- Operator: United Fruit Co.
- Ordered: as type (EC2-S-C1) hull, MC hull 1203
- Builder: St. Johns River Shipbuilding Company, Jacksonville, Florida
- Cost: $2,068,703
- Yard number: 11
- Way number: 5
- Laid down: 24 May 1943
- Launched: 20 August 1943
- Sponsored by: Miss Marjorie Byrd McCarty
- Completed: 5 September 1943
- Identification: Call sign: KXMB
- Fate: Placed in the James River Reserve Fleet, Lee Hall, Virginia, 11 March 1948; Sold for scrapping, 22 January 1973, withdrawn from fleet, 18 May 1973

General characteristics
- Class & type: Liberty ship; type EC2-S-C1, standard
- Tonnage: 10,865 LT DWT; 7,176 GRT
- Displacement: 3,380 long tons (3,434 t) (light); 14,245 long tons (14,474 t) (max)
- Length: 441 feet 6 inches (135 m) oa; 416 feet (127 m) pp; 427 feet (130 m) lwl
- Beam: 57 feet (17 m)
- Draft: 27 ft 9.25 in (8.4646 m)
- Installed power: 2 × Oil fired 450 °F (232 °C) boilers, operating at 220 psi (1,500 kPa); 2,500 hp (1,900 kW)
- Propulsion: 1 × triple-expansion steam engine, (manufactured by Filer and Stowell, Milwaukee, Wisconsin); 1 × screw propeller
- Speed: 11.5 knots (21.3 km/h; 13.2 mph)
- Capacity: 562,608 cubic feet (15,931 m^{3}) (grain); 499,573 cubic feet (14,146 m^{3}) (bale)
- Complement: 38–62 USMM; 21–40 USNAG
- Armament: Varied by ship; Bow-mounted 3-inch (76 mm)/50-caliber gun; Stern-mounted 4-inch (102 mm)/50-caliber gun; 2–8 × single 20-millimeter (0.79 in) Oerlikon anti-aircraft (AA) cannons and/or, 2–8 × 37-millimeter (1.46 in) M1 AA guns

SS William Byrd was a Liberty ship built in the United States during World War II. She was named after William Byrd II, an American planter and author from Charles City County, in colonial Virginia. He is considered the founder of Richmond, Virginia.

== Construction ==
William Byrd was laid down on 24 May 1943, under a Maritime Commission (MARCOM) contract, MC hull 1203, by the St. Johns River Shipbuilding Company, Jacksonville, Florida; she was sponsored by Miss Marjorie Byrd McCarty, a descendant of the namesake, she was launched on 20 August 1943.

== History ==
She was allocated to the United Fruit Co., on 5 September 1943. On 11 March 1948, she was placed in the James River Reserve Fleet, Lee Hall, Virginia. On 11 August 1953, she was withdrawn from the fleet to be loaded with grain under the "Grain Program 1953", she returned loaded with grain on 28 August 1953. She was again withdrawn from the fleet on 2 June 1956, to have the grain unloaded, she returned reloaded on 30 June 1956. On 16 March 1960, she was withdrawn from the fleet to be unloaded, she returned empty on 28 March 1960. She was sold for scrapping, 22 January 1973, to Luria Brothers and Company, for $59,577.75. She was withdrawn from the fleet, 18 May 1973.

== Bibliography ==
- "St. John's River Shipbuilding, Jacksonville FL". www.ShipbuildingHistory.com. 16 October 2010.
- Maritime Administration. "William Byrd". Ship History Database Vessel Status Card. U.S. Department of Transportation, Maritime Administration.
- Davies, James (May 2004). "Specifications (As-Built)" (PDF). p. 23.
- "SS William Byrd".
