= SS Waigstill Avery =

WWII Liberty ship

History

United States
- Name: Waigstill Avery
- Namesake: Waightstill Avery
- Builder: North Carolina Shipbuilding Company, Wilmington, North Carolina
- Yard number: 88
- Way number: 7
- Laid down: 24 March 1943
- Launched: 22 April 1943
- Out of service: 1947
- Honors and awards: 1 × battle star
- Fate: Scrapped 1960

General characteristics
- Type: Liberty ship
- Tonnage: 7,000 long tons deadweight (DWT)
- Length: 441 ft 6 in (134.57 m)
- Beam: 56 ft 11 in (17.35 m)
- Draft: 27 ft 9 in (8.46 m)
- Propulsion: Two oil-fired boilers; Triple expansion steam engine; Single screw; 2,500 hp (1,864 kW)
- Speed: 11 knots (20 km/h; 13 mph)
- Capacity: 9,140 tons cargo
- Complement: 41
- Armament: 1 × Stern-mounted 4 in (100 mm) deck gun; AA guns

SS Waigstill Avery (MC contract 910) was a Liberty ship built in the United States during World War II. She was named after Waightstill Avery, the first Attorney General of North Carolina who fought a duel with Andrew Jackson in 1788.

The ship was laid down by North Carolina Shipbuilding Company in their Cape Fear River yard on March 24, 1943, and launched on April 22, 1943. Avery was chartered to the Polarus Steamship Company until October 1947 by the War Shipping Administration. A.L. Burbank delivered her to the Wilmington Fleet of the National Defense Reserve Fleet in November 1947. The vessel was sold for scrap in 1960.

== Awards ==
The Avery's Naval Armed Guard detachment received one battle star for World War II service during Convoy UGS-37, when the convoy came under air attack.
