= List of Liberty ships (William H–Wy) =

This is a list of Liberty ships with names beginning with William H to Wy.

== Description ==
The standard Liberty ship (EC-2-S-C1 type) was a cargo ship 441 feet 6 inches (134.57 m) long overall, with a beam of 56 feet 10 3/4 inches (17.34 m). It had a depth of 37 feet 4 inches (11.38 m) and a draft of 26 feet 10 inches (8.18 m). It was powered by a triple expansion steam engine, which had cylinders of 24 1/2 inches (62 cm), 37 inches (94 cm) and 70 inches (180 cm) diameter by 48 inches (120 cm) stroke. The engine produced 2,500ihp at 76rpm. Driving a four-blade propeller 18 feet 6 inches (5.64 m) in diameter, could propel the ship at 11 knots (20 km/h).

Cargo was carried in five holds, numbered 1–5 from bow to stern. Grain capacity was 84,183 cubic feet (2,383.8 m^{3}), 145,604 cubic feet (4,123.0 m^{3}), 96,429 cubic feet (2,730.6 m^{3}), 93,190 cubic feet (2,639 m^{3}) and 93,190 cubic feet (2,639 m^{3}), with a further 49,086 cubic feet (1,390.0 m^{3}) in the deep tanks. Bale capacity was 75,405 cubic feet (2,135.2 m^{3}), 134,638 cubic feet (3,812.5 m^{3}), 83,697 cubic feet (2,370.0 m^{3}), 82,263 cubic feet (2,329.4 m^{3}) and 82,435 cubic feet (2,334.3 m^{3}), with a further 41,135 cubic feet (1,164.8 m^{3}) in the deep tanks.

It carried a crew of 45, plus 36 United States Navy Armed Guard gunners. Later in the war, this was altered to a crew of 52, plus 29 gunners. Accommodation was in a three deck superstructure placed midships. The galley was equipped with a range, a 25 US gallons (95 L) stock kettle and other appliances. Messrooms were equipped with an electric hot plate and an electric toaster.

== William Hackett ==
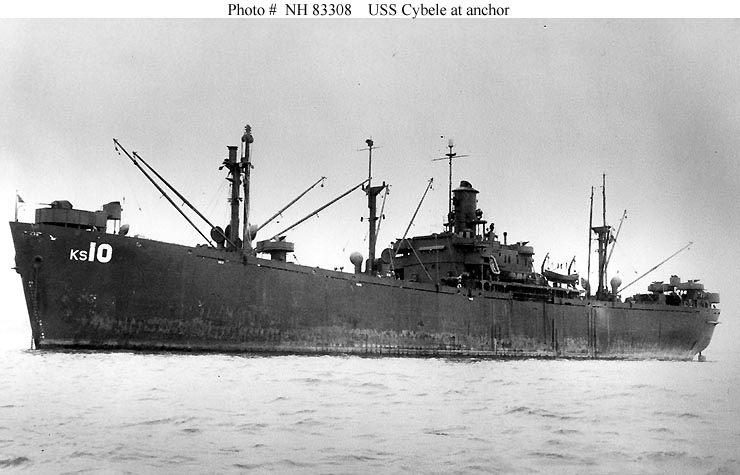
USS Cybele

William Hackett was built by Delta Shipbuilding Company, New Orleans, Louisiana. Her keel was laid on 29 August 1944. She was launched as William Hackett on 9 October and delivered as Cybele on 14 November. To the United States Navy. Converted for naval use by Tampa Shipbuilding Company, Tampa, Florida. Laid up in reserve at Pearl Harbor, Hawaii in June 1946. Towed to San Francisco, California in June 1947 and returned to the United States Maritiem Commission (USMC). Laid up in Suisun Bay. She was reported to have been scrapped at Portland, Oregon in 1965.

== William H. Allen ==
William H. Allen was built by Permanente Metals Corporation, Richmond, California. Her keel was laid on 30 June 1943. She was launched on 22 July and delivered on 3 August. Laid up at Beaumont, Texas post-war, she was scuttled off Freeport, Texas on 23 September 1976.

== William Harper ==
William Harper was built by Delta Shipbuilding Company. Her keel was laid on 29 December 1942. She was launched on 10 February 1943 and delivered on 24 February. Laid up at Mobile, Alabama post-war, she was scrapped at Panama City, Florida in April 1973.

== William H. Ashley ==
William H. Ashley was built by Oregon Shipbuilding Corporation, Portland, Oregon. Her keel was laid on 20 September 1943. She was launched on 6 October and delivered on 14 October. To the United States Navy in 1956. Subsequently, laid up in the James River. She was scrapped at Philadelphia, Pennsylvania in September 1972.

== William H. Aspinwall ==
William H. Aspinwall was built by Permanente Metals Corporation. Her keel was laid on 31 December 1942. She was launched on 4 February 1943 and delivered on 13 February. Laid up at Beaumont post-war, she was scrapped at Brownsville in September 1972.

== William Hawkins ==
William Hawkins was built by North Carolina Shipbuilding Company, Wilmington, North Carolina. Her keel was laid on 27 April 1942. She was launched on 3 July and delivered on 20 July. She was scrapped at Baltimore, Maryland in 1958.

== William H. Carruth ==
William H. Carruth was a tanker built by California Shipbuilding Corporation, Terminal Island, Los Angeles, California. She was completed in November 1943. To the United States Navy and renamed Camel. Returned to the War Shipping Administration (WSA) in May 1946 and renamed William H. Carruth. Sold in 1948 to Albatross Steamship Co., New York, then sold later that year to Transfuel Corp., Dover, Delaware. Converted to a cargo ship at Savannah in 1949. Now 7,177 GRT. Sold in 1958 to Penntrans Co. Operated under the management of Penn Shipping Co. Renamed Penn Shipper in 1959. Sold in 1961 to Halcyon Steamship Co., New York and renamed Halcyon Pioneer. Returned to the American Government in 1963, she was scrapped that year at Tacoma, Washington.

== William H. Clagett ==
William H. Clagett was built by Permanente Metals Corporation. Her keel was laid on 3 May 1944. She was launched on 23 May and delivered on 31 May. She was converted to a crane barge at Portland, Oregon in 1968.

== William H. Crawford ==
William H. Crawford was built by Todd Houston Shipbuilding Corporation, Houston, Texas. Her keel was laid on 14 December 1942. She was launched on 5 February 1943 and delivered on 20 February. She was scrapped at Terminal Island in December 1969.

== William H. Dall ==
William H. Dall was built by Oregon Shipbuilding Corporation. Her keel was laid on 8 October 1943. She was launched on 27 October and delivered on 4 November. Built for the WSA, she was operated under the management of American Mail Line. Sold in 1947 to Lloyd Veniziano, Venice, Italy and renamed Cannareggio. Sold in 1964 to Maritime Rojo Compania Navigation, Panama and renamed Amilla. Reflagged to Liberia and operated under the management of Pegasus Ocean Services. Sold in 1965 to World Tradeways Shipping Ltd. and renamed Tradeways II. Remaining under the same flag and management. She broke in two in the Atlantic Ocean 200 nautical miles (370 km) north of the Azores (49°58′N 25°40′W) on 22 October 1965 whilst on a voyage from Antwerp, Belgium to Montreal, Canada. The bow section sank. The stern section sank the next day.

== William H. Edwards ==
William H. Edwards was built by Southeastern Shipbuilding Corporation, Savannah, Georgia. Her keel was laid on 29 August 1944. She was launched on 5 October and delivered on 20 October. She was scrapped at Portland, Oregon in May 1967.

== William H. Gray ==
William H. Gray was built by Oregon Shipbuilding Corporation. Her keel was laid on 18 April 1943. She was launched on 7 May and delivered on 15 May. She was scrapped at Everett, Washington in March 1961.

== William H. Jackson ==
William H. Jackson was a limited troop carrier built by Bethlehem Fairfield Shipyard, Baltimore. Her keel was laid on 22 May 1943. She was launched on 23 June and delivered on 2 July. Built for the WSA, she was operated under the management of T. J. Stevenson & Co. Sold in 1947 to Constantine Konaliadis, Montevideo, Uruguay and renamed Aristocratis. Reflagged to Honduras. Sold later that year to Society Armamente Aristomenis, Panama. Remaining under the Honduran flag. Sold in 1951 to Compania de Navigation Phoenix, Panama and renamed San Roque. Reflagged to Panama and operated under the management of Ivanovic & Co. Owners name changed to Phoenix Compania de Navigation in 1957 and she was placed under the management of Combined Argosies Inc. Sold in 1960 to Olistim Navigation Co. and renamed Aghios Spyridon. Reflagged to Lebanon and operated under the management of Purvis Shipping Co. Renamed San Spyridon later that year. Management transferred to Franco Shipping Co. in 1961, then Avenida Antonio Augusto de Aguiar in 1964 and returned to Purvis Shipping Co. in 1967. She was scrapped at Shanghai, China in December 1967.

== William H. Kendrick ==
William H. Kendrick was built by Delta Shipbuilding Company. Her keel was laid on 10 October 1944. She was launched on 19 November and delivered on 12 December. Built for the WSA, she was operated under the management of J. H. Winchester & Co. Sold in 1947 to Dichmann, Wright & Pugh, New York. Renamed Judge Bland in 1949. Sold in 1954 to San Rafael Compania Navigation, Panama and renamed Athenian. Reflagged to Liberia and operated under the management of Orion Shipping & Trading Co. Renamed Andros Citadel in 1956. Sold in 1957 to Transmarine Navigation Inc., remaining under the same flag and management. Management transferred to Maritime Overseas Corp. in 1960. Sold in 1963 to Caroline Navigation Inc. and renamed San Nicola. Remaining under the Liberian flag and operated under the management of Ceres Shipping Co. She broke up and sank in the Pacific Ocean 750 nautical miles (1,390 km) north west of Honolulu, Hawaii (30°13′N 168°52′W) on 23 January 1965 whilst on a voyage from San Francisco to a port in Taiwan.

== William H. Lane ==
William H. Lane was built by New England Shipbuilding Corporation, South Portland, Maine. Her keel was laid on 5 February 1945. She was launched on 30 March and delivered on 14 April. To the French Government under Lend-Lease. Placed under the management of Compagnie Générale Transatlantique in 1946. Renamed Port en Bessin in 1947. Sold in 1963 to Charles August Audibert, Monte Carlo, Monaco and renamed Isly, remaining under the French flag. Sold later that year to Sociètè Naval Delmas Vieljeux, Paris, France and renamed Port en Bessin. Reported sold in 1967 to Harma Shipping Co. and reflagged to Cyprus. She was scrapped at Shanghai in 1968.

== William H. McGuffey ==
William H. McGuffey was built by Oregon Shipbuilding Corporation. Her keel was laid on 4 April 1943. She was launched on 25 April and delivered on 3 May. Sunk as a breakwater at Nikishka, Alaska in April 1967.

== William H. Moody ==
William H. Moody was built by Permanente Metals Corporation. Her keel was laid on31 August 1943. She was launched on 20 September and delivered on 29 September. Built for the WSA, she was operated under the management of Norton Lilly Management Co. Sold in 1947 to Giovanni B. Bibolini, Genoa and renamed Maria B.. Renamed Maria Bibolini in 1948. Sold in 1955 to Transport Marittimi Mercantili, Genoa. Sold in 1963 to Patt Masfield & Co. and renamed Bootes. Reflagged to Panama. She was scrapped at Hong Kong in March 1967.

== William Hodson (I) ==
William Hodson was built by Bethlehem Fairfield Shipyard. Her keel was laid on 7 March 1944. She was launched as William Hodson on 8 April and delivered as Chung Tung on 18 April. To China under Lend-Lease. Returned to USMC in 1947 and renamed Arthur P. Fairfield. Renamed Admiral Arthur P. Fairfield in 1948, operated under the management of American Pacific Steamship Co. Management transferred to Pacific Far East Line in 1949. Laid up in 1950, then sold in 1951 to Pacific Cargo Carriers Corp. and renamed Sea Coronet. Operated under the management of Orion Shipping & Trading Co. Sold in 1954 to Alaska Steamship Co. and renamed Tonsina. Modified to carry containers. Converted to a container ship in 1964, able to carry 175 24 ft containers. She was scrapped at Sakaide, Japan in June 1970.

== William Hodson (II) ==
Willia Hodson was built by Bethlehem Fairfield Shipyard. Her keel was laid on 7 March 1944. She was launched as William Hodson on 8 April and delivered as Sverre Helmersen on 22 April. She was damaged by a mine in the North Sea (51°19′N 1°47′E) on 23 April 1945 whilst on a voyage from Antwerp to New York. She was towed in to Dover, then to Falmouth, United Kingdom. Returned to the United States Government in 1946, declared a constructive total loss. She was scrapped at Zeebrugge, Belgium in July 1948.

== William Hodson (III) ==
William Hodson was built by Bethlehem Fairfield Shipyard. Her keel was laid on 23 May 1944. She was launched on 29 June and delivered on 12 July. Built for the WSA, she was operated under the management of R. A. Nichol & Co. Sold in 1947 to West Coast Trans-Oceanic Steamship Line, Portland, Oregon and renamed Oregon Trader. Sold in 1959 to West Coast Steamship Line, Portland, Oregon. To the United States Department of Commerce in 1962, then sold to Zidell Explorations Inc. later that year. She was scrapped at Portland, Oregon in 1963.

== William Hooper ==
William Hooper was built by North Carolina Shipbuilding Company. Her keel was laid on 22 August 1941. She was launched on 21 February 1942 and delivered on 7 April. Built for the WSA, she was operated under the management of American South African Line. She was torpedoed by an aircraft in the Barents Sea on 4 July 1942 and was abandoned. She was subsequently torpedoed and sunk (75°55′N 27°14′E) by U-334.

== William H. Prescott ==
William H. Prescott was built by California Shipbuilding Corporation. Her keel was laid on 9 June 1942. She was launched on 21 July and delivered on 10 August. She developed cracks in her hull on 2 February 1944 whilst on a voyage from Cardiff, United Kingdom to New York. She put in to St. John's, Newfoundland. Subsequently repaired and returned to service. Laid up at Mobile post-war, she was scrapped there in April 1972.

== William H. Seward ==
William H. Seward was built by Oregon Shipbuilding Corporation. Her keel was laid on 14 July 1942. She was launched on 20 August and delivered on 31 August. She was scrapped at Hirao, Japan in August 1960.

== William H. Todd ==
William H. Todd was built by New England Shipbuilding Corporation. Her keel was laid on 2 August 1943. She was launched on as William H. Todd on 19 September and delivered as Ameriki on 30 September. To the Greek Government under Lend-Lease. Sold in 1948 to Marathon Steamship Co., Piraeus, Greece. Sold in 1956 to Society Anonyme of Maritime Enterprises, Panama and renamed Ellinis, remaining under the Greek flag. Placed under the management of J. C. Carras in 1965. She was scrapped at Sakai, Japan in 1967.

== William Hume ==
William Hume was built by Oregon Shipbuilding Corporation. Her keel was laid on 7 July 1943. She was launched on 27 July and delivered on 4 August. She struck a mine off Salvore Point, Italy on 12 November 1945 whilst on a voyage from Baltimore to Trieste, Italy. Although taken in tow, she consequently sank in the Adriatic Sea (45°36′N 14°41′E).

== William H. Webb ==
William H. Webb was built by Bethlehem Fairfield Shipyard. Her keel was laid on 5 April 1943. She was launched on 7 May and delivered on 15 May. She ran aground on a reef off Kildin Island, Soviet Union on 15 January 1946 whilst on a voyage from Philadelphia to Murmansk, Soviet Union. She broke in two and was a total loss.

== William H. Welch ==
William H. Welch was built by Bethlehem Fairfield Shipyard. Her keel was laid on 31 January 1943. She was launched on 10 March and delivered on 31 March. Built for the WSA, she was operated under the management of T. J. Stevenson & Co. She was driven ashore on Fura Island, at the entrance to Loch Ewe, United Kingdom on 26 February 1944 whilst on a voyage from London, United Kingdom to New York. She broke in two and was a total loss.

== William H. Wilmer ==
William H. Wilmer was built by Bethlehem Fairfield Shipyard. Her keel was laid on 19 February 1943. She was launched on 25 March and delivered on 5 April. Built for the WSA, she was operated under the management of Dichmann, Wright & Pugh. Management transferred to Fall River Navigation Co. in 1946. She was laid up in 1949. Sold in 1951 to Advance Steamship Corp. Operated under the management of Overseas Navigation Corp. Sold in 1955 to Sirena Shipping Co., Panama and renamed Lomaland. Reflagged to Liberia, remaining under the same management. Sold in 1958 to Transatlantic Transport Corp. and renamed Theopan. Remaining under the Liberian flag and operated under the management of World Seas Shipping Corp. She caught fire at Beirut, Lebanon on 15 April 1962 whilst on a voyage from the Philippines to Beirut and was a constructive total loss. She was scrapped at Ambelaki, Greece in 1962.

== William I. Kip ==
William I. Kip was built by California Shipbuilding Corporation. Her keel was on 12 July 1943. She was launched as William I. Kip on 4 August and delivered as Sampan on 17 August. to the Ministry of War Transport (MoWT) under Lend-Lease. Operated under the management of Union-Castle Steamship Co. Returned to USMC in 1947. Renamed William I. Kip and laid up at Mobile. She was scrapped at New Orleans in May 1962.

== William I. Chamberlain ==
William I. Chamberlain was built by Oregon Shipbuilding Corporation. Her keel was laid on 6 December 1943. She was launched on 22 December and delivered on 7 January 1944. Built for the WSA, she was operated under the management of American South African Line. Sold in 1947 to Società Azioni Emanuele V. Parodi, Genoa, Italy and renamed Maria Parodi. Sold in 1961 to Chatham Shipping Co. and renamed General Tsakalotos. Reflagged to Greece and operated under the management of Tsakalotos Navigation Corp. She departed from Bombay, India for Aden on 18 August 1966 after having cracks in her hull repaired. Further cracks developed on 22 August in the Arabian Sea (18°52′N 63°40′E). She subsequently completed her voyage. She ran aground in the Plentzia on 7 November 1966 whilst on a voyage from Emden, West Germany to Bilbao, Spain. She was refloated the next day and towed in to Bilbao, where she was laid up. She was scrapped in Bilbao in 1968.

== William James ==
William James was built by California Shipbuilding Corporation. Her keel was laid on 4 March 1943. She was launche on 31 March and delivered on 14 April. She was scrapped at Bordentown, New Jersey in April 1963.

== William J. Bryan ==
William J. Bryan was built by J. A. Jones Construction Company, Panama City, Florida. Her keel was laid on 21 September 1942. She was launched on 22 April 1943 and delivered on 20 May. She was scrapped at Kearny, New Jersey in August 1965.

== William J. Duane ==
William J. Duane was built by Oregon Shipbuilding Corporation. Her keel was laid on 24 December 1942. She was launched on 17 January 1943 and delivered on 27 January. She was scrapped at Sakai in April 1961.

== William J. Gray ==
William J. Gray was built by Permanente Metals Corporation. Her keel was laid on 18 February 1944. She was launched on 9 March and delivered on 16 March. She was scrapped at Portland, Oregon in March 1969.

== William Johnson ==
William Johnson was built by Bethlehem Fairfield Shipyard. Her keel was laid on 18 March 1942. She was launched on 22 May and delivered on 16 June. She was scrapped at Panama City, Florida in 1962.

== William J. Palmer ==
William J. Palmer was built by Permanente Metals Corporation. Her keel was laid on 25 September 1943. She was launched on 18 October and delivered on 26 October. She struck a mine and sank at Trieste on 4 August 1945 whilst on a voyage from New York to Trieste. She was reported to have been refloated in January 1949, towed to San Bartolomeo al Mare, Italy and scrapped.

== William J. Riddle ==
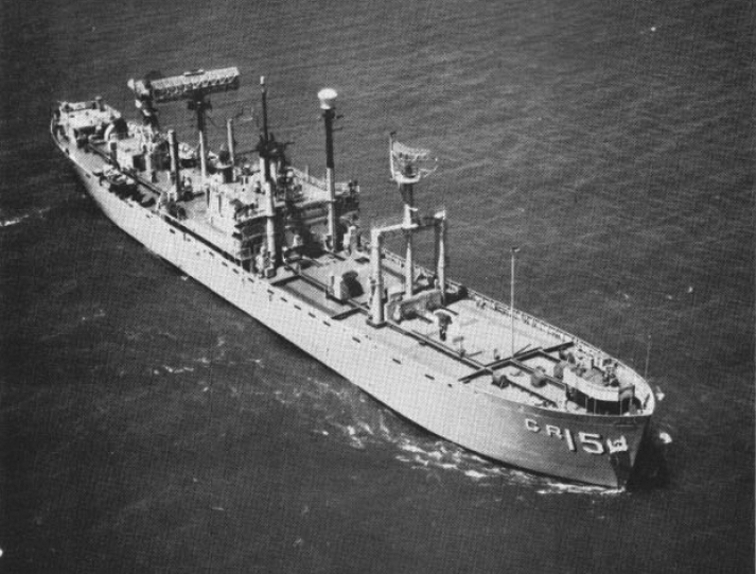
USS Tracer

William J. Riddle was a boxed aircraft transport built by J. A. Jones Construction Company, Panama City. Her keel was laid on 24 December 1944. She was launched on 31 January 1945 and delivered 15 February. She was converted to carry livestock in 1946, but reconverted to a cargo ship later that year. Laid up in the James River in 1947. To the United States Navy in May 1957 and renamed Interrupter. Converted for naval use at Charleston Naval Shipyard, Charleston, South Carolina. Renamed Tracer on 4 September 1959. Laid up in reserve in Suisun Bay in September 1965. She was sold to buyers in Tacoma in July 1973 and converted to a fish processing plant for use at Unalaska Island, Alaska. She was scrapped in China in 2000.

== William J. Worth ==
William J. Worth was built by California Shipbuilding Corporation. Her keel was laid on 30 December 1942. She was launched on 28 January 1943 and delivered on 13 February. She was scrapped at Mobile in January 1967.

== William Keith ==
William Keith was built by Permanente Metals Corporation. Her keel was laid on 15 July 1943. She was launched on 6 August 1943 and delivered on 17 August. She was scrapped at Tacoma in October 1966.

== William Kelly ==
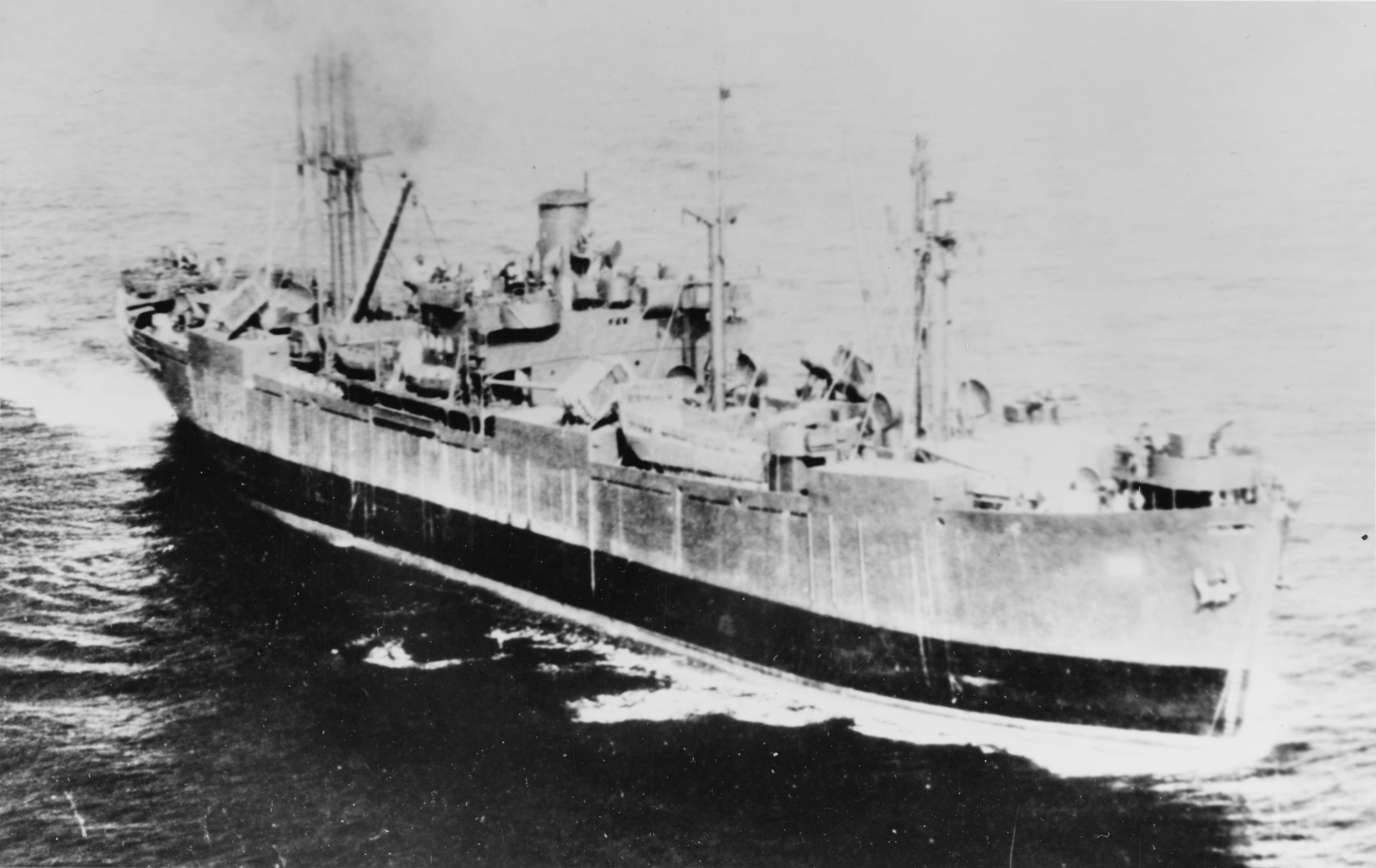
USS Rotanin

William Kelly was built by California Shipbuilding Corporation. Her keel was laid on 25 July 1943. She was launched as William Kelly on 18 August and delivered to the United States Navy as Rotanin on 6 September. She was returned to the WSA in April 1946 and renamed William Kelly. Laid up in reserve at Suisun Bay, she was scrapped at Richmond, California in September 1966.

== William Kent ==
William Kent was built by Marinship Corporation, Sausalito, California. Her keel was laid on 20 July 1942. She was launched on 11 November and delivered on 21 December. She was scrapped at Oakland, California in December 1964.

== William King ==
William King was built by New England Shipbuilding Corporation. Her keel was laid on 9 June 1942. She was launched on 21 October and delivered on 31 October. Built for the WSA, she was operated under the management of Marine Transport Lines. She was torpoedoed and sunk in the Indian Ocean 200 nautical miles (370 km) east of Durban, Union of South Africa (30°22′S 34°15′E) by U-198 on 6 June 1943 whilst on a voyage from Basrah, Iran to Cape Town, Union of South Africa.

== William K. Kamaka ==
William K. Kamaka was built by Todd Houston Shipbuilding Corporation. Her keel was laid on 29 November 1944. She was launched on 6 January 1945 and delivered on 17 January. She was scrapped at Kearny in December 1967.

== William K. Vanderbilt ==
William K. Vanderbilt was built by Permanente Metals Corporation. Her keel was laid on 9 August 1942. She was launched on 19 September and delivered on 15 October. Built for the WSA, she was operated under the management of Isthmian Steamship Company. She was torpedoed and sunk in the Pacific Ocean west of Suva, Fiji Islands (18°41′S 175°07′E) by I-19 on 16 May 1943 whilst on a voyage from Port Vila, New Hebrides to Suva.

== William L. Davidson ==
William L. Davidson was built by North Carolina Shipbuilding Company. Her keel was laid on 22 February 1943. She was launched on 24 March and delivered on 31 March. She was driven ashore 5 nautical miles (9.3 km) from the Oskøy Lighthouse, Norway on 9 March 1946 whilst on a voyage from Copenhagen, Denmark to New York. She was refloated and towed in to Stavanger. Sold to the United States Navy in 1947 for use as a hulk. Presumed subsequently scrapped.

== William Leavitt ==
William Leavitt was built by New England Shipbuilding Corporation. Her keel was laid on 20 April 1944. She was launched on 7 June and delivered on 19 June. She was scrapped at New Orleans in October 1964.

== William Leroy Gable ==
William Leroy Gable was built by Southeastern Shipbuilding Corporation. Her keel was laid on 6 December 1944. She was launched on 13 January 1945 and delivered on 31 January. Built for the WSA, she was operated under the management of Union Sulphur Company. Management transferred to Grace Line Inc. in 1946. Sold in 1947 to Compania de Navigation San Leonardo, Panama and renamed Cimon. Placed under the management of Mar-Trade Corp in 1949. Sold in 1955 to Sierra Compania Navigation and renamed Archigetis. Remaining under the Panamanian flag and operated under the management of John C. Hadjipateras & Sons. Sold in 1960 to Pan Norse Steamship Co. and renamed Western Venture. Remaining under the Panamanian flag and operated under the management of Wallem & Co. Management transferred to Wah Kwong & Co. in 1965. Sold in 1968 to Electra Carriers Inc., remaining under the same flag and management. She was at Kaohsiung, Taiwan for scrapping in May 1969.

== William Libby ==
William Libby was built by Bethlehem Fairfield Shipyards. Her keel was laid on 28 July 1944. She was launched on 30 August and delivered on 13 September. Builf for the WSA, she was operated under the management of American Foreign Steamship Co., New York. Sold to her managers in 1947 and renamed American Starling. Sold in 1957 to Atlantic Starling Steamship Corp. and renamed Atlantic Starling. Reflagged to Liberia and operated under the management of her former owners. Sold in 1961 to her managers and renamed American Starling. Reflagged to the United States. Sold in 1963 to Cargo Ships & Tankers Inc., New York and renamed Bearcat. She was laid up at Hong Kong in 1964 and was scrapped there in 1965, or 1966.

== William Lloyd Garrison ==
William Lloyd Garrison was built by California Shipbuilding Corporation. Her keel was laid on 4 September 1942. She was launched on 9 October and delivered on 27 October. She was scrapped at Terminal Island in 1959.

== William L. Marcy ==
William L. Marcy was built by California Shipbuilding Corporation. Her keel was laid on 25 November 1942. She was launched on 28 December and delivered on 10 January 1943. Built for the WSA, she was operated under the management of American-Hawaiian Steamship Company. She was torpedoed and damaged by an E-boat in the English Channel off Juno Beach (49°25′N 0°27′W) on 7 August 1944. She was towed to the St. Helen's Roads on 11 August, then to the Mumbles, United Kingdom and beached on 18 August. She was refloated on 25 September and towed in to Swansea, where she was declared a constructive total loss. She was towed to the River Blackwater and laid up. She was towed to Bremerhaven, West Germany in 1948 and loaded with obsolete ammunition before being towed out to sea and scuttled.

== William L. McLean ==
William L. McLean was built by Southeastern Shipbuilding Corporation. her keel was laid on 4 November 1944. She was launched on 13 December and delivered on 30 December. She was scrapped at Portland, Oregon in April 1964.

== William L. Smith ==
William L. Smith was built by Todd Houston Shipbuilding Corporation. Her keel was laid on 12 November 1942. She was launched on 6 January 1943 and delivered on 20 January. She was scrapped at Panama City, Florida in August 1964.

== William L. Sublette ==
William L. Sublette was built by Oregon Shipbuilding Corporation. Her keel was laid on 19 September 1943. She was launched on 4 October and delivered on 12 October. Built for the WSA, she was operated under the management of Alaska Steamship Co. To the French Government in 1947 and renamed Toulon. Operated under the management of Société Maritime Nationale. She was scrapped at Bilbao in December 1966.

== William L. Watson ==
William L. Watson was built by J. A. Jones Construction Company, Panama City. Her keel was laid on 6 June 1944. She was launched on 13 July and delivered on 26 July. Built for the WSA, she was operated under the management of Black Diamond Steamship Company. Sold in 1947 to Salvatore Tagliavia, Palermo, Sicily, Italy and renamed Panormus. Sold in 1952 to Transmediterranea Società di Navigazione per Azioni, Palermo. Sold in 1962 to San Antonio Inc. and renamed Al Kheir. Reflagged to Lebanon and operated under the management of Compania Armatoriale Italiana. She developed cracks in her hull in July 1966 whilst on a voyage from Bombay to Baltimore. She put back to Bombay for temporary repairs. She was scrapped at La Spezia, Italy in February 1967.

== William L. Yancey ==
William L. Yancey was built by Southeastern Shipbuilding Company. Her keel was laid on 17 May 1943. She was launched on 25 July and delivered on 14 August. Built for the WSA, she was operated under the management of J. H. Winchester & Co. Sold in 1947 to Anthony D. Stathatos, Athens, Greece and renamed Eleni Stathatos. Sold in 1961 to Seafarers Investments Inc. Remaining under the Greek flag and operated under the management of Stathatos & Co. Sold in 1965 to Gasmar S.A. and renamed Cebollati. Reflagged to Uruguay and operated under the management of Ocean Steamship Agency. She was sold to West German shipbreakers in 1968, but was resold. Sold in 1969 to St. Caroline Shipping Co., Gibraltar and renamed Cebolla. Reflagged to the United Kingdom. She was scrapped at Shanghai in 1969.

== William Lyon Phelps ==
William Lyon Phelps was built by New England Shipbuilding Corporation. Her keel was laid on 8 July 1944. She was launched on 24 August and delivered on 31 August. She was scrapped at Philadelphia in 1964.

== William MacLay ==
William MacLay was built by Bethlehem Fairfield Shipyard. Her keel was laid on 25 April 1942. She was launched on 22 June and delivered on 7 July. She was scrapped at Kearny in October 1967.

== William Matson ==
William Matson was built by Permanente Metals Corporation. Her keel was laid on 11 July 1943. She was launched on 2 August and delivered on 11 August. She was scrapped at Everett in February 1962.

== William McKinley ==
William McKinley was built by Bethlehem Fairfield Shipyard. Her keel was laid on 7 December 1942. She was launched on 21 January 1943 and delivered on 6 February. Laid up in the James River post-war, she was scrapped at Kearny in August 1971.

== William M. Eastland ==
William M. Eastland was built by Todd Houston Shipbuilding Corporation. Her keel was laid on 27 November 1943. She was launched on 18 January 1944 and delivered on 29 January. Built for the WSA, she was operated under the management of West India Steamships Inc. To the French Government under Lend-Lease in 1946. Sold to them in 1946 and operated under the management of Nouvelle Compagnie Havraise Peninsulaire de Navigation, Paris. Renamed Le Havre in 1947, then Ville du Havre in 1948. Sold to her managers in 1950. To the French Government in 1958, operated under the management of her former owners. Renamed Le Havre in 1960 and placed under the management of Compagnie Havraise de Navigation à Vapeur. Management transferred to Compagnie Havraise de Navigation Corblet in 1961. Sold in 1964 to Society Anonyme Uruguaya de Navigation, Montevideo and renamed Almar. Sold in 1967 to Limnia Shipping Co. and renamed Tegean. Reflagged to Cyprus and operated under the management of G. Tornaritis. She was scrapped at Shanghai in 1969.

== William M. Evarts ==
William M. Evarts was built by Delta Shipbuilding Company. Her keel was laid on 6 March 1943. She was launched on 22 April and delivered on 5 May. She was scrapped at Baltimore in October 1961.

== William M. Gwin ==
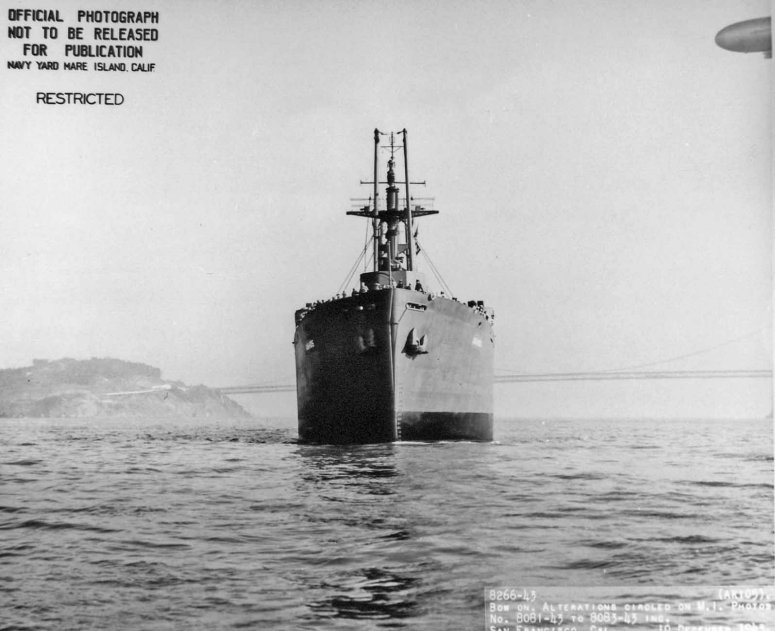
USS Lesuth

William M. Gwin was built by California Shipbuilding Corporation. Her keel was laid on 24 March 1943. She was launched on 17 April and delivered on 29 April. To the United States Navy in October 1943 and renamed Lesuth. Converted for naval use by United Engineering Co., Alameda, California. Returned to the USMC in May 1947 and renamed William M. Gwin. She was scrapped at Richmond, California in 1964.

== William M. Meredith ==
William M. Meredith was built by Oregon Shipbuilding Corporation. Her keel was laid on 7 January 1943. She was launched on 5 February and delivered on 14 February. She was scrapped at Barrow-in-Furness, United Kingdom in September 1960.

== William Moultrie ==
William Moultrie was built by North Carolina Shipbuilding Company. Her keel was laid on 5 February 1942. She was launched on 22 May and delivered on 11 June. Laid up at Mobile post-war, she was scrapped at Panama City, Florida in September 1970.

== William M. Rayburn ==
William M. Rayburn was built by Todd Houston Shipbuilding Corporation. Her keel was laid on 27 August 1943. She was launched on 15 October and delivered on 28 October. She was scrapped at Philadelphia in October 1966.

== William M. Stewart ==
William M. Stewart was built by California Shipbuilding Corporation. Her keel was laid on 21 April 1942. She was launched on 14 June and delivered on 6 July. She was scrapped at Baltimore in September 1961.

== William Mulholland ==
William Mulholland was built by California Shipbuilding Corporation. Her keel was laid on 31 October 1942. She was launched on 1 December and delivered on 21 December. She was scrapped at Chickasaw, Alabama in May 1962.

== William N. Byers ==
William N. Byers was built by Permanente Metals Corporation. Her keel was laid on 20 June 1943. She was launched on 17 July and delivered on 29 July. Built for the WSA, she was operated under the management of Isthmian Steamship Company. Sold in 1947 to Pateras & Mavrophillipas, Athens and renamed Nicolas. Operated under the management of Lyras & Lemos Bros. Management transferred to Lyras Bros. in 1950. Sold in 1952 to Ch. Pateras, Athens, remaining under the same management. She was scrapped at Vado Ligure, Italy in April 1964.

== William N. Pendleton ==
William N. Pendleton was built by Todd Houston Shipbuilding Corporation. Her keel was laid on 20 February 1943. She was launched on 5 April and delivered on 23 April. Laid up in the Hudson River post-war, she was sold to Karachi shipbreakers in 1970. Resold, she was scrapped at Burriana, Spain in August 1971.

== William Osler ==
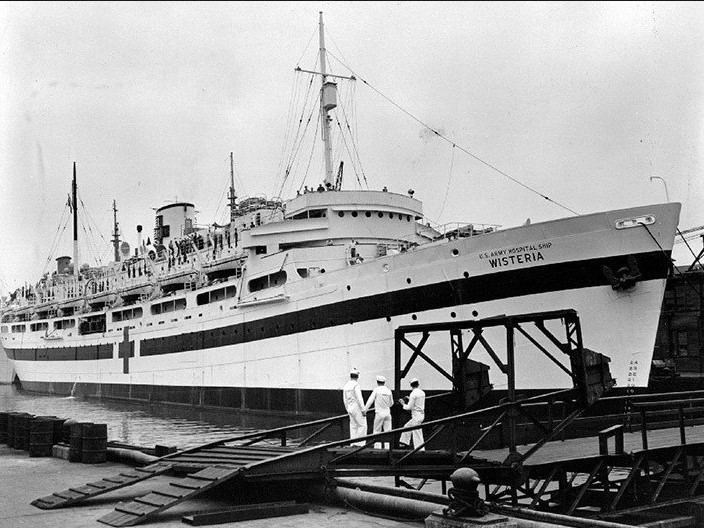
USAHS Wisteria

William Osler was built by Bethlehem Fairfield Shipyard. Her keel was laid on 6 February 1943. She was launched on 6 March and delivered on 22 March. Converted to a hospital ship at New York in November 1943. To the United States Army and renamed Wisteria. Returned to the United States Government in 1947 and laid up in reserve. She was scrapped at Portland, Oregon in March 1969.

== William Paca ==
William Paca was built by Bethlehem Fairfield Shipyard. Her keel was laid on 13 December 1941. She was launched on 30 May 1942 and delivered on 19 June. She collided with the Empire ship Empire Ness off Terneuzen, Netherlands on 30 November 1944, sinking Empire Ness. She was scrapped at Mobile in December 1969.

== William Patterson ==
William Patterson was built by Bethlehem Fairfield Shipyard. Her keel was laid on 29 April 1942. She was launched on 26 June and delivered on 13 July. Converted to type EC2-G-8g ship by Bethlehem Steel, Baltimore in 1957. Re-engined with gas turbines which gave her a speed of 17 knots (31 km/h). Later laid up in the James River. She was scrapped at Bilbao in April 1971.

== William P. Duval ==
William P. Duval was built by J. A. Jones Construction Company, Panama City. Her keel was laid on 10 August 1944. She was launched on 15 September and delivered on 29 September. Bui;t for the WSA, shew as operated under the management of Blidberg Rothchild Company. Sold in 1947 to Società di Navigazione Italia, Genoa and renamed Vesuvio. Laid up at Genoa in 1972, she was sold to shipbreakers at La Spezia in February 1973.

== William Peffer ==
William Peffer was built by Permanente Metals Corporation. Her keel was laid on 16 December 1943. She was launched on 7 January 1944 and delivered on 14 January. Built for the WSA, she was operated under the management of Alaska Transportation Co. To the French Government in 1947 and renamed Lisieux. Operated under the management of Compagnie Générale Transatlantique. Renamed Bar le Duc in 1952 and placed under the management of Chargeurs Réunis. Sold in 1954 to Società per Azioni Emanuele V. Parodi, Genoa and renamed Andrea Parodi. Sold in 1960 to Plamar S.A., Panama and renamed Albur. Reflagged to Liberia and operated under the management of Olympic Maritime S.A. Sold in 1962 to Saudena S.A., Montevideo, Operated under the management of Agencia Rio de la Plata. Management transferred to Flemar Ltd. in 1965. She was scrapped at Shanghai in January 1969.

== William Pepper ==
William Pepper was built by Bethlehem Fairfield Shipyard. Her keel was laid on 25 March 1943. She was launched on 24 April and delivered on 1 May. She was scrapped at Panama City, Florida in February 1962.

== William Pepperrell ==
William Pepperrell was built by New England Shipbuilding Corporation. Her keel was laid on 9 April 1943. She was launched on 3 June and delivered on 12 June. She was scrapped at Portland, Oregon in December 1969.

== William P. Fessenden ==
William P. Fessenden was built by New England Shipbuilding Corporation. Her keel was laid on 8 September 1942. She was launched on 11 November and delivered on 15 December. She was scrapped at Portland, Oregon in February 1959.

== William Phips ==
William Phips was built by New England Shipbuilding Corporation. Her keel was laid on 15 February 1943. She was launched on 15 April and delivered on 28 April. Laid up at Mobile post-war, she was scrapped at Panama City, Florida in September 1970.

== William Pierce Frye ==
William Pierce Frye was built by New England Shipbuilding Corporation. Her keel was laid on 15 November 1942. She was launched on 11 February 1943 and delivered on 23 February. Built for the WSA, she was operated under the management of Mystic Steamship Co. She was torpedoed and sunk in the Atlantic Ocean (56°56′N 24°15′W) by U-610 on 29 March 1943 whilst on a voyage from Halifax, Dominion of Canada to a British port.

== William Pitt Preble ==
William Pitt Preble was built by New England Shipbuilding Corporation. Her keel was laid on 15 September 1943. She was launched as William Pitt Preble on 5 November 1943 and delivered as Samrich on 20 November. To the MoWT under Lend-Lease. Operated under the management of Shaw, Savill & Albion Co., London. Sold to her managers in 1947 and renamed Cufic. Sold in 1953 to Società Officine G. Malvicini Vapori, Genoa and renamed Santa Elisabetta. Sold in 1967 to Bluestar Enterprises Inc. and renamed Star. Reflagged to Panama and operated under the management of Victoria Steamship Co. She was scrapped at Kaohsiung in May 1968.

== William P. McArthur ==
William P. McArthur was built by Oregon Shipbuilding Corporation. Her keel was laid on 20 June 1942. She was launched on 27 July and delivered on 11 August. She was converted to a crane barge at New Orleans in 1966 and renamed Elmar I.

== William Prouse ==
William Prouse was built by Permanente Metals Corporation. Her keel was laid on 13 June 1943. She was launched on 4 July and delivered on 27 July. She was scrapped at Baltimore in November 1960.

== William Rawle ==
William Rawle was a limited troop carrier built by Bethlehem Fairfield Shipyard. Her keel was laid on 5 July 1942. She was launched on 25 August and delivered on 31 August. Built for the WSA, she was operated under the management of A. H. Bull & Co., New York. Sold to her managers in 1947 and renamed Arlyn. She ran aground on the Silver Bank, off the north coast of the Dominican Republic on 6 June 1958 whilst on a voyage from San Juan, Puerto Rico to Philadelphia. She was refloated on 9 June and towed in to San Juan. Declared a constructive total loss, she was scrapped there in December 1958.

== William R. Cox (I) ==
William R. Cox was built by Bethlehem Fairfield Shipyard. Her keel was laid on 30 November 1943. She was launched as William R. Cox on 21 December and delivered as Samtweed on 30 December. To the MoWT under Lend-Lease. Operated under the management of Hall Line Ltd. Sold in 1947 to Ellerman Lines Ltd. and renamed City of Newport, remaining under the same management. Sold in 1961 to Veritas Shipping Corp. and renamed Istrios II. Reflagged to Greece and operated under the management of N. & J. Vlassopulos. She was scrapped at Trieste in April 1967.

== William R. Cox (II) ==
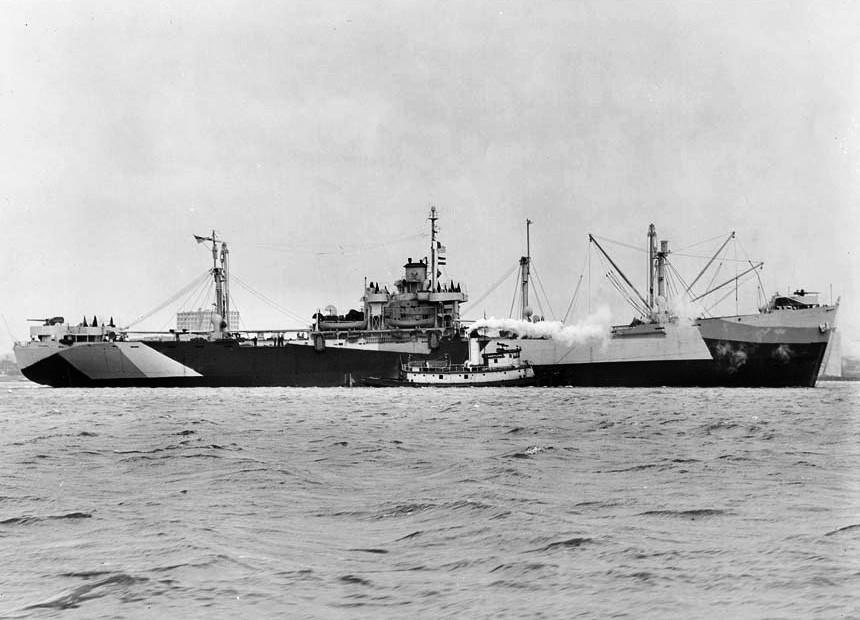
USS Tuscana

William R. Cox was built by Bethlehem Fairfield Shipyard. Her keel was laid on 5 December 1943. She was launched on 29 December and delivered on 8 January 1944. To the United States Navy and renamed Tuscana. Converted for naval use by Maryland Drydock Company, Baltimore. Returned to the WSA in January 1946 and renamed William R. Cox. She was scrapped at Wilmington, North Carolina in May 1967.

== William R. Davie ==
William R. Davie was built by North Carolina Shipbuilding Company. Her keel was laid on 18 May 1942. She was launched on 12 July and delivered on 29 July. Laid up at Mobile post-war, she was scrapped at Panama City, Florida in September 1972.

== William R. Day ==
William R. Day was built by Bethlehem Fairfield Shipyard. Her keel was laid on 24 December 1942. She was launched on 12 February 1943 and delivered on 2 March. She was scrapped at |Portland, Maine in December 1959.

== William R. Lewis ==
William R. Lewis was built by Todd Houston Shipbuilding Corporation. Her keel was laid on 18 November 1944. She was launched on 22 December and delivered on 31 December. Built for the WSA, she was operated under the management of Black Diamond Steamship Corp. Management transferred to Polarus Steamships Inc., New York in 1946. Sold to her managers in 1947. Renamed Polarus Carrier in 1950. Sold later the year to North Atlantic & Gulf Steamship Co. and renamed Norcuba. Sold in 1954 to San Emilio Compania Navigation, Panama and renamed Evicynthia. Reflagged to Liberia and operated under the management of Starboard Shipping Co. Lengthened at Innoshima, Japan in 1956. Now 511 feet 6 inches (155.91 m) long and 8,342 GRT. Sold in 1960 to Spartan Shipping AE Inc. and renamed Spartan. Reflagged to Greece, remaining under the same management. Sold in 1962 to Doric Shipping & Trading Corp. and renamed Elaine. Reflagged to the United States, remaining under the same management. She was scrapped at Onomichi, Japan in January 1968.

== William R. Nelson ==
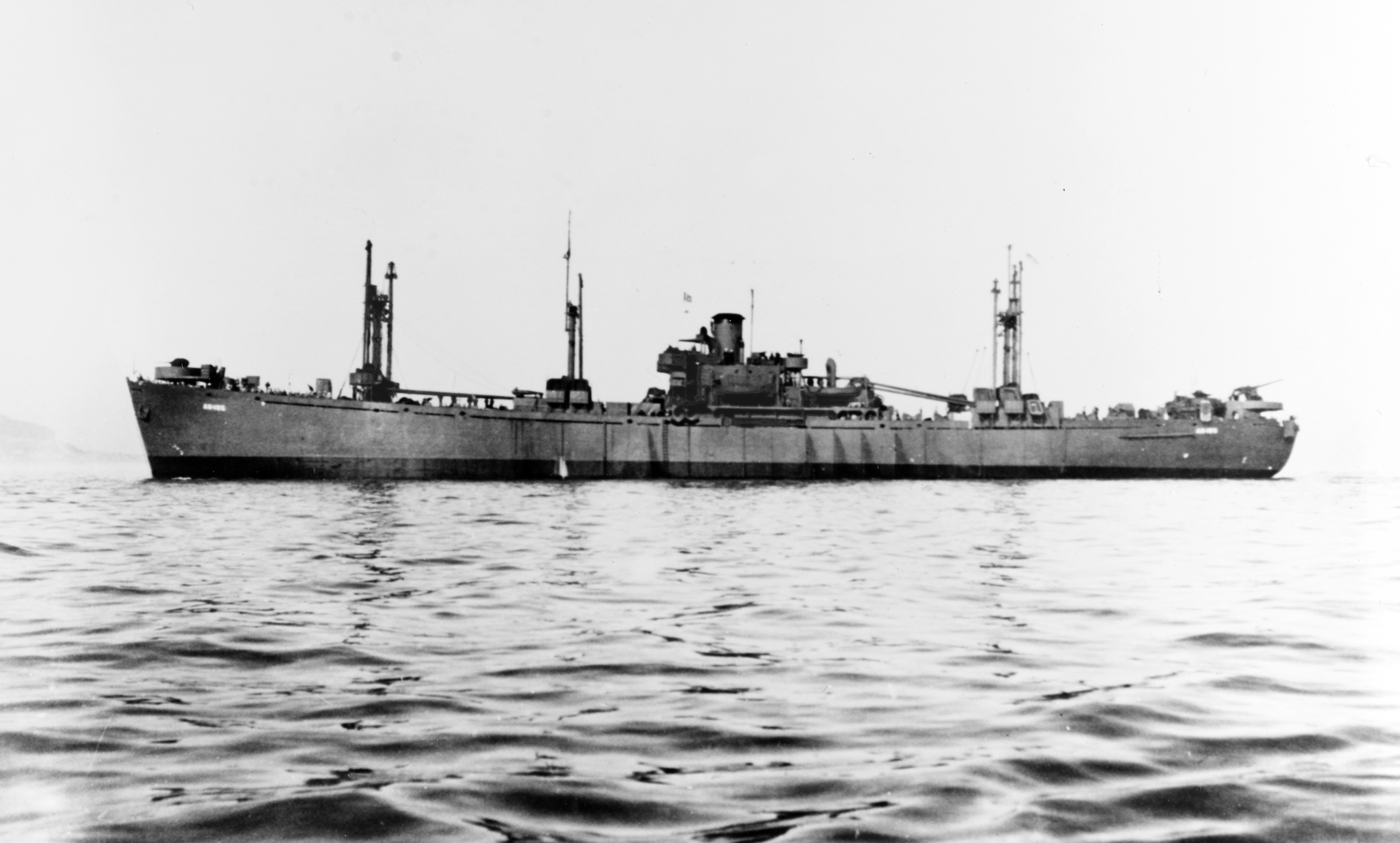
USS Naos

William R. Nelson was built by California Shipbuilding Corporation. Her keel was laid on 8 June 1943. She was launched on 30 June and delivered on 15 July. To the United States Navy and renamed Naos. Converted for naval use by Los Angeles Shipbuilding & Drydock Co. Returned to the WSA in November 1945 and renamed William R. Nelson. Laid up in Suisun Bay. She was scrapped at Oakland in January 1971.

== William S. Baer ==
william S. Baer was built by Bethlehem Fairfield Shipyard. Her keel was laid on 22 May 1944. She was launched on 27 June and delivered on 8 July. Built for the WSA, she was operated under the management of Marine Transport Lines. Sold in 1947 to Calmar Steamship Corp. and renamed Pennmar. Sold in 1955 to Bethlehem Steel Corp. Operated under the management of her previous owners. Returned to the United States Government in 1964 in exchange for a Type C4 ship. Laid up in reserve in the James River. She was scrapped at Santander, Spain in August 1970.

== William Schirmer ==
William Schirmer was built by Permanente Metals Corporation. Her keel was laid on 2 March 1944. She was launched on 25 March and delivered on 31 March. She was scrapped at Kearny in October 1969.

== William S. Clark ==
William S. Clark was built by Permanente Metals Corporation. Her keel was laid on 16 September 1943. She was launched on 5 October and delivered on 14 October. Built for the WSA, she was operated under the management of American President Lines. Sold in 1947 to Società Anonyme di Navigazione Unione, Genoa and renamed Punta Mesco. She was scrapped at La Spezia in July 1965.

== William S. Halsted ==
William S. Halsted was an animal transport built by Bethlehem Fairfield Shipyard. Her keel was laid on 13 February 1943. She was launched on 16 March and delivered on 29 March. Built for the WSA, she was operated under the management of International Freighting Corp. Management transferred to Moore-McCormack Lines in 1946. She was laid up in the James River in 1948. Sold in 1951 to Ocean Transportation Co., New York and renamed Ocean C. Renamed Ocean Lotte in 1952, then renamed Ocean Nora in 1955 and placed under the management of Maritime Overseas Corp. Sold in 1957 to Colonial Steamship Corp. and renamed Andros Legend. Operated under the management of Orion Shipping & Trading Co. Sold in 1957 to Transmarine Navigation Inc. Reflagged to Liberia, remaining under the same management. Management transferred to Maritime Overseas Corp. in 1960. Sold in 1963 to Caroline Navigation Inc. and renamed San Remo. Operated under the management of Ceres Shipping Co. She was scrapped at Hirao in May 1968.

== William Sharon ==
William Sharon was built by Permanente Metals Corporation. Her keel was laid on 31 August 1943. She was launched on 25 September and delivered on 5 October. Built for the WSA, she was operated under the management of United Fruit Company. She was damaged by fire in a kamikaze attack in the Surigao Strait on 28 December 1944 whilst on a voyage from Leyte to Mindanao, Philippines. Temporary repairs were made at Leyte; she was then towed to San Francisco for permanent repairs. Sold in 1947 to Constantin Konialidis, Montevideo and renamed Aris. Reflagged to Honduras. Sold in 1948 to Society Armamente Aristomenis, Panama and renamed Cnoza. Operated under the management of her former owners. Sold later that year to Compania Naviera Oceana, Panama. Operated under the management of A. Lusi Ltd. Renamed Cnosa in 1950. Sold in 1954 to Tramp Tankers Corp. Reflagged to Liberia and operated under the management of Livanos Corp. Sold in 1965 to Aethalia Shipping Corp. and renamed Aethalia. Remaining under the Liberian flag and operated under the management of Ocean Shipbrokerage Co. She was scrapped at Todotsu, Japan in May 1969.

== William S. Ladd ==
William S. Ladd was built by Oregon Shipbuilding Corporation. Her keel was laid on 29 August 1943. She was launched on 13 September and delivered on 20 September. Built for the WSA, she was operated under the management of Weyerhaeuser Steamship Co. Struck by a kamikaze aircraft off Leyte on 10 December 1944 whilst on a voyage from New Guinea to Leyte, she caught fire, exploded and sank.

== William Smallwood ==
William Smallwood} was built by Bethlehem Fairfield Shipyard. Her keel was laid on 31 July 1943. She was launched as William Smallwood on 28 August and delivered as Sampa on 6 September. To the MoWT under Lend-Lease. Operated under the management of Houlder Bros. She struck a mine and sank 9 nautical miles (17 km) north of Ostend, Belgium (51°24′N 2°53′E) on 27 February 1945. The wreck was dispersed in September 1962.

== William Sproule ==
William Sproule was built by Permanente Metals Corporation. Her keel was laid on 25 April 1944. She was launched on 14 May and delivered on 25 May. Built for the WSA, she was operated under the management of De La Rama Steamship Company, Inc. Management transferred to Pacific-Atlantic Steamship Co. in 1946. Sold in 1951 to Tini Steamship Co., Dover, Delaware and renamed Christine. Sold in 1954 to Ocean Enterprises and renamed Felicia. Reflagged to Liberia and operated under the management of Carras Ltd. Renamed Alexandra in 1955. Sold in 1956 to Madison Shipping Corp. and renamed Madison Bell. Remaining under the Liberian flag and operated under the management of World Seas Shipping Inc. Management transferret of Ocean Shipping & Brokerage Corp. in 1959. She was scrapped at Hirao in June 1963.

== William S. Rosecrans ==
William S. Rosecrans was built by Oregon Shipbuilding Corporation. Her keel was laid on 11 August 1942. She was launched on 11 September and delivered on 23 September. Built for the WSA, she was operated under the management of American President Lines. She struck a mine off Naples, Italy (40°00′N 14°15′E on 6 January 1944 whilst on a voyage from Naples to an American port. She was scuttled by a Royal Navy ship.

== William S. Thayer ==
William S. Thayer was built by Bethlehem Fairfield Shipyard. Her keel was laid on 12 July 1943. She was launched on 11 August and delivered on 19 August. Built for the WSA, she was operated under the management of A. L. Burbank & Co. She was torpedoed and sunk in the Barents Sea off Bear Island, Norway (73°52′N 18°26′E) by U-711 on 30 April 1944 whilst on a voyage from Murmansk to Loch Ewe.

== William Strong ==
William Strong was built by Bethlehem Fairfield Shipyard. Her keel was laid on 12 March 1943. She was launched on 13 April and delivered on 24 April. To the Norwegian Government under Lend-Lease and renamed Roald Amundsen. Operated under the management of Notraship. Sold in 1946 to Ringdals Rederi A/S, Oslo. Operated under the management of Olav Ringdal. She ran aground off Skudeneshavn on 20 November 1947 whilst on a voyage from Antwerp to Narvik. She broke in two and was a total loss.

== William Sturgis ==
William Sturgis was built by New England Shipbuilding Corporation. Her keel was laid on 24 June 1943. She was launched on 12 August and delivered on 23 August. She was scrapped at Kearny in October 1969.

== William S. Young ==
William S. Young was a limited troop carrier built by California Shipbuilding Corporation. Her keel was laid on 22 December 1942. She was launched on 18 January 1943 and delivered on 2 February. Built for the WSA, she was operated under the management of A. H. Bull & Co. To the French Government in 1946. Operated under the management of Compagnie des Messageries Maritimes. Renamed Nantes in 1947. Sold in 1960 to West African Carriers Corp., Lugano, Switzerland and renamed Tajo. Reflagged to Liberia. She ran aground 30 nautical miles (56 km) north west of Las Palmas, Spain on 28 March 1964 whilst on a voyage from Takoradi, Ghana to Rotterdam, Netherlands and was a total loss.

== William T. Barry ==
William T. Barry was built by North Carolina Shipbuilding Company. Her keel was laid on 14 May 1943. She was launched on 8 June and delivered on 14 June. Laid up at Mobile post-war, she was scuttled off the coast of Alabama on 5 February 1975.

== William T. Coleman ==
William T. Coleman was built by Marinship Corporation. Her keel was laid on 4 July 1942. She was launched on 15 October and delivered on 30 November. Laid up in the James River, post-war, she was scrapped at Philadelphia in May 1972.

== William Terry Howell ==
William Terry Howell was built by Southeastern Shipbuilding Corporation. Her keel was laid on 30 November 1944. She was launched on 6 January 1945 and delivered on 24 January. She was scrapped at Faslane in November 1960.

== William Thornton ==
William Thornton was built by Permanente Metals Corporation. Her keel was laid on 19 March 1943. She was launched on 16 April and delivered on 30 April. Built for the WSA, she was operated under the management of American President Lines. Management transferred to Lykes Brothers Steamship Co. in 1946. Sold in 1951 to Western Navigation Corp., New York and renamed Western Trader. Sold in 1956 to Denton Steamship Corp. and renamed Western Ranger. Operated under the management of North Atlantic Marine Co. Renamed Wang Ranger in 1957. Sold in 1958 to Pacific Navigator Corp. and renamed Pacific Navigator. Operated under the management of World Tramping Agencies. Sold in 1960 to Equitable Shipping Corp. and renamed Equitable Sailor. Operated under the management of A. L. Burbank & Co. Sold later that year to Columbus Shipping Corp. and renamed Backus, remaining under the same management. Sold in 1961 to Masuerte Compania Navigation, Panama and renamed Avre. Reflagged to Greece and operated under the management of Maritime Managers Co. Management transferred to Admanthos Shipping Agency in 1964. Sold in 1966 to Bristol Steamship Corp. and renamed Delfini. Reflagged to Panama and operated under the management of Cape Shipping Ltd. She was driven ashore at Kaizuka, Japan on 16 February 1968. Subsequently arrested, she was refloated in August and anchored off Kure. She was scrapped at Aioi in 1969.

== William Tilghman ==
William Tilghman was built by Bethlehem Fairfield Shipyard. Her keel was laid on 20 June 1942. She was launched on 7 August and delivered on 18 August. Laid up in Puget Sound post-war, she was scrapped at Tacoma in August 1970.

== William T. Sherman ==
William T. Sherman was built by Oregon Shipbuilding Corporation. Her keel was laid on 29 October 1942. She was launched on 25 November and delivered on 5 November. Built for the WSA, she was operated under the management of Alaska Steamship Co. To the French Government in 1947 and renamed Colmar. Operated under the management of Société Nationale des Chemins de Fer Français. Management transferred to Nouvelle Compagnie Havraise Peninsulaire de Navigation in 1950, then Société Navale Delmas-Vieljeux in 1960. She was scrapped at Gandia, Spain in September 1971.

== William Tyler ==
William Tyler was built by New England Shipbuilding Corporation. Her keel was laid on 26 June 1944. She was launched on 16 August and delivered on 31 August. Laid up in the James River post-war, she was scrapped at Santander in May 1972.

== William Tyler Page ==
William Tyler Page was built by Bethlehem Fairfield Shipyard. Her keel was laid on 1 May 1943. She was launched on 31 May and delivered on 22 June. She was scrapped at Mobile in March 1964.

== William Vaughn Moody ==
William Vaughn Moody was built by Permanente Metals Corporation. Her keel was laid on 12 December 1943. She was launched on 2 January 1944 and delivered on 10 January. She was scrapped at New Orleans in July 1969.

== William W. Campbell ==
William W. Campbell was built by Permanente Metals Corporation. Her keel was laid on 9 October 1943. She was launched on 29 October and delivered on 12 November. Built for the WSA, she was operated under the management of American President Lines. Sold in 1947 to Livanos Maritime Co. and renamed Nedon. Reflagged to Greece. Sold in 1949 to Eugenie Maritime Co., Piraeus. Placed under the management of Maritime Brokers Ltd. in 1952. Sold in 1963 to Kai Tai Marine Lines, Taipei, Taiwan and renamed New Kailung. Reflagged to China. Reflagged to Taiwan in 1965. She was scrapped at Kaohsiung in March 1967.

== William W. Gerhard ==
William W. Gerhard was built by Bethlehem Fairfield Shipyard. Her keel was laid on 28 March 1943. She was launched on 26 April and delivered on 6 May. Built for the WSA, she was operated under the management of American South African Line. She was torpedoed and set afire 45 nautical miles (83 km) off Salerno, Italy by U-593 on 21 September 1943 whilst on a voyage from Casablanca, Morocco to Salerno. She was taken in tow, but exploded and broke in two the next day. The bow section sank, the stern section was scuttled by an Allied warship.

== William Wheelwright ==
William Wheelwright was built by Delta Shipbuilding Company. Her keel was laid on 13 March 1944. She was launched on 27 April and delivered on 5 June. Laid up at Beaumont post-war, she was scrapped at Brownsville in May 1973.

== William Whipple ==
William Whipple was built by Permanente Metals Corporation. Her keel was laid on 9 May 1942. She was launched on 14 July and delivered on 7 August. Built for the WSA, she was operated under the management of Isthmian Steamship Company. She was scrapped at Baltimore in October 1958.

== William Wilkins ==
William Wilkins was built by Todd Houston Shipbuilding Corporation. Her keel was laid on 22 January 1943. She was launched on 6 March 1943 and delivered on 22 March. She was scrapped at Panama City, Florida in June 1963.

== William Williams ==
William Williams was built by Permanente Metals Corporation. Her keel was laid on 5 July 1942. She was launched on 21 August and delivered on 8 September. Built for the WSA, she was operated under the management of Isthmian Steamship Company. She was torpedoed and damaged in the Pacific Ocean (20°09′S 178°04′W) by I-19 on 5 May 1943 whilst on a voyage from Espiritu Santo, New Hebrides to Auckland, New Zealand. She was taken in tow by USS Catalpa on 7 May and towed to Fiji, then Auckland. Repaired sufficiently to make her seaworthy, she was towed to Sydney. To the United States Navy and renamed Venus. Fully repaired and converted for naval service., serving as an accommodation ship. Decommissioned at Pearl Harbor in April 1946. Towed to San Francisco and returned to the USMC. Laid up in Suisun Bay, she was scrapped at Oakland in August 1961.

== William Windom ==
William Windom was built by Permanente Metals Corporation. Her keel was laid on 11 December 1942. She was launched on 8 January 1943 and delivered on 19 January. She was scrapped at New Orleans in August 1964.

== William Winter ==
William Winter was a tanker built by California Shipbuilding Company. She was completed in November 1943. To the United States Navy and renamed Elk. Returned to the WSA in May 1946 and renamed William Winter. Laid up in the James River. Sold in 1949 to Maris Transportation System. Operated under the management of T. J. Stevenson & Co. Laid up again later that year. Sold in 1951 to Colonial Steamship Corp. and renamed Seapearl. Operated under the management of Orion Shipping & Trading Co. Sold in 1952 to Montepardo Compania Armamente. Reflagged to Panama, remaining under the same management. Renamed Korthi in 1953. Converted to a 7,252 GRT cargo ship at Greenock, United Kingdom in 1955. Lengthened at Sasebo, Japan in 1956, now 511 feet 6 inches (155.91 m) long and 8,390 GRT. Reflagged to Liberia that year. Renamed Andros County in 1957. Sold in 1960 to Oceanic Development Corp. and renamed Kalamas. Reflagged to Greece, remaining under the same management. She ran aground 2 nautical miles (3.7 km) south of the Cape Arago Lighthouse, Oregon on 3 September 1960 whilst on a voyage from Chemainus, Canada to an Australian port. She was refloated with the assistance of tugs and towed in to Coos Bay. Declared uneconomic to repair, she was scrapped at Oakland in 1962.

== William Wirt ==
William Wirt was built by Bethlehem Fairfield Shipyard. Her keel was laid on 13 May 1942. She was launched on 4 July and delivered on 24 July. Built for the WSA, she was operated under the management of International Freighting Corp. She was damaged by bombing off Philippeville, Algeria on 7 January 1943 whilst on a voyage from Liverpool, United Kingdom to an Algerian port. She was again damaged by bombing off Gibraltar on 7 February 1943. She was repaired in Liverpool. Laid up in reserve post-war, she was scrapped at Kearny in 1966.

== William W. Johnson ==
William W. Johnson was built by Todd Houston Shipbuilding Corporation. Her keel was laid on 23 December 1944. She was launched on 31 January 1945 and delivered on 9 February. Built for the WSA, she was operated under the management of W. J. Rountree Co. Management transferred to Lykes Brothers Steamship Company in 1946. Laid up at Beaumont in 1949. Sold in 1951 to Peninsular Navigation Corp., New York and renamed Seagarden. Operated under the management of Orion Shipping & Trading Co. She ran aground off Tobago on 17 April 1961 whilst on a voyage from a Brazilian port to a Puerto Rican port. She was refloated on 19 April. Declared a constructive total loss, she was scrapped at Bilbao in September 1961.

== William W. Loring ==
William W. Loring was built by J. A. Jones Construction Company, Panama City. Her keel was laid on 29 November 1943. She was launched on 17 January 1944 and delivered on 7 March. She was scrapped at Baltimore in February 1962.

== William W. Mayo ==
William W. Mayo was built by Permanente Metals Corporation. Her keel was laid on 18 May 1943. She was launched on 10 June and delivered on 21 June. She was scrapped at Baltimore in January 1960.

== William W. McKee ==
William W. McKee was built by Delta Shipbuilding Company. Her keel was laid on 5 December 1944. She was launched on 13 January 1945 and delivered on 31 January. Built for the WSA, she was operated under the management of Union Sulphur Company. Management transferred to Cosmopolitan Shipping Co., New York in 1946. She was laid up at Beaumont in 1948. Sold in 1951 to Greenwave Steamship Corp. and renamed Sunwave. Operated under the management of Orion Shipping & Trading Co. Renamed Seaglobe in 1952. Sold in 1953 to Navegantes Compania Armamente and renamed Ypsilou. Reflagged to Panama, remaining under the same management. Renamed Andros Heights in 1957. Sold in 1959 to Maracay Compania Navigation, Panama and renamed Georgia S. M.. Reflagged to Liberia, remaining under the same management. Sold in 1964 to Maradicta Compania Navigation, Panama. Remaining under the same flag and management. Sold in 1966 to Virtue Navigatio Corp. and renamed Grand Virtue. Reflagged to Taiwan and operated under the management of Orient Star Navigation Corp. She was scrapped at Kaohsiung in February 1968.

== William Wolfskill ==
William Wolfskill was built by California Shipbuilding Corporation. Her keel was laid on 23 November 1943. She was launched on 21 December and delivered on 31 December. Built for the WSA, she was operated under the management of Union Sulphur Company. To the Dutch Government in 1947 and renamed Lely. Renamed Alderamin later that year and placed under the management of Van Nievelt, Goudriaan & Co. Sold in 1958 to Apatouria Shipping Corp. and renamed Apatouria. Reflagged to Liberia and operated under the management of Goulandris Ltd. Management transferred to Wigham, Richardson & Co. in 1962. Reflagged to Somalia in 1968. She was scrapped at Santander in August 1971.

== William W. Seaton ==
William W. Seaton was built by Southeastern Shipbuilding Corporation. Her keel was laid on 17 November 1944. She was launched on 22 December and delivered on 12 January 1945. Built for the WSA, she was operated under the management of T. J. Stevenson & Co. Management transferred to American Pacific Steamship Co. in 1946, then to Alcoa Steamship Co. later that year. She was laid up at Wilmington, North Carolina in 1946. Sold in 1951 to Colonial Steamship Corp. and renamed Seamerchant. Sold later that year to Transpacific Navigation Corp. Operated under the management of Orion Shipping & Trading Co. Sold in 1953 to Nueva Granada Compania Navigation, Panama and renamed Menites. Operated under the management of Goulandris Ltd. Sold in 1963 to Universal Mariners S.A. and renamed Tempo. Reflagged to Panama and operated under the management of Sincere Navigatio Corp. She was driven ashore in a typhoon at Kaohsiung on 30 May 1966. Declared a constructive total loss, she was scrapped in situ.

== Willie Jones ==
Willie Jones was built by North Carolina Shipbuilding company. Her keel was laid on 19 January 1943. She was launched on 16 February and delivered on 24 February. Reported to be in United States Navy service in 1968. Presumed sunk as a target ship.

== Willis C. Hawley ==
Willis C. Hawley was built by Oregon Shipbuilding Corporation. Her keel was laid on 3 July 1943. She was launched as Willis C. Hawley on 24 July and delivered as Stalinabad on 31 July. To the Soviet Union under Lend-Lease. Renamed Dushambe in 1962. Name subsequently reported as Dushanbe. She was scrapped in 1975, and removed from shipping registers in 1977.

== Willis J. Abbott ==
Willis J. Abbott was built by Bethlehem Fairfield Shipyard. Her keel was laid on 1 November 1943. She was launched as Willis J. Abbot on 26 November and delivered as Samboston on 6 December. To the MoWT, operated under the management of Ellerman & Papayanni Lines. Sold in 1947 to Ellerman Lines Ltd. and renamed City of Rochester. Operated under the management of Ellerman & Bucknall Steamship Co. Management transferred to Hall Line Ltd. in 1951. Sold in 1962 to Sirikari Compania Navigation, Panama and renamed Fotini Xilas. Reflagged to Greece and operated under the management of Fred Hunter. Sold in 1964 to Cardinal Shipping Corp. and renamed Resolute II. Reflagged to Liberia and operated under the management of Maritime Associates. She was scrapped at Taipei in 1968.

== Willis Van Devanter ==
Willis Van Devanter was built by California Shipbuilding Corporation. Her keel was laid on 27 April 1942. She was launched on 19 June and delivered on 10 July. She was scrapped at Kearny in September 1967.

== Will Rodgers ==
Will Rodgers was built by Bethlehem Fairfield Shipyard. Her keel was laid on 11 October 1942. She was launched on 8 November and delivered on 27 November. Built for the WSA, she was operated under the management of Merchants & Miners Transportation Co. She was torpedoed and damaged in the Irish Sea (53°48′N 4°46′W) by U-1024 on 12 April 1945 whilst on a voyage from New York to Liverpool and Antwerp. She was beached at Holyhead, United Kingdom and then later towed to Liverpool. She was repaired and returned to service. Laid up at Mobile post-war, she was scrapped there in March 1971.

== Will R. Wood ==
Will R. Wood was built by Todd Houston Shipbuilding Corporation. Her keel was laid on 23 August 1943. She was launched on 11 October and delivered on 25 October. She was scrapped at Yokosuka, Japan in June 1961.

== Wilson B. Keene ==
Wilson B. Keene was built by New England Shipbuilding Corporation. Her keel was laid on 1 September 1944. She was launched on 14 October and delivered on 26 October. She was wrecked by the explosions of the Liberty ship Grandcamp and the steamship Highflyer at Texas City, Texas on 16 April 1947.

== Wilson P. Hunt ==
Wilson P. Hunt was built by Oregon Shipbuilding Corporation. Her keel was laid on 12 May 1943. She was launched on 1 June and delivered on 9 June. She was scrapped at Oakland in October 1964.

== Winfield Scott ==
Winfield Scott was built by Todd Houston Shipbuilding Corporation. Her keel was laid on 25 July 1941. She was launched on 12 May 1942 and delivered on 22 June. She was scrapped at New Orleans in July 1966.

== Winfield S. Stratton ==
Winfield S. Stratton was built by Permanente Metals Corporation. Her keel was laid on 20 July 1943. She was launched on 15 August and delivered on 31 August. Laid up in the James River post-war, she was scrapped at La Spezia in November 1970.

== Winfred L. Smith ==
Winfred L. Smith was built by Bethlehem Fairfield Shipyard. Her keel was laid on 8 March 1943. She was launched on 7 April and delivered on 17 April. She was scrapped at Portland, Maine in November 1959.

== Winslow Homer ==
Winslow Homer was built by New England Shipbuilding Corporation. Her keel was laid on 8 September 1942. She was launched on 11 November and delivered on 27 December. Laid up in Puget Sound post-war, she was scrapped at Seattle, Washington in October 1970.

== Winthrop L. Marvin ==
Winthrop L. Marvin was built by New England Shipbuilding Corporation. Her keel was laid on 19 September 1944. She was launched on 3 November and delivered on 11 November. Built for the WSA, she was operated under the management of Isthmian Steamship Co. Sold in 1951 to Mar-Trade Corp., New York and renamed John B. Kulukundis. Sold later that year to Martis Steamship Corp, operated under the management of her former owners. Management transferred to Cargo & Tankship Management Corp. in 1958. Sold in 1960 to Pan Norse Steamship Co. and renamed Princie. Reflagged to Panama and operated under the management of Wallem & Co. Sold in 1963 to Peggy Navigation Co., Panama and renamed Loyal Breakers. Reflagged to Liberia and operated under the management of China Marine Investment Co. She arrived at Kaohsiung for scrapping in May 1967. Renamed Pacmerchant in August, she made one voyage under that name and was scrapped at Kaohsiung in October 1967.

== Woodbridge N. Ferris ==
Woodbridge N. Ferris was built by Bethlehem Fairfield Shipyard. Her keel was laid on 2 December 1942. She was launched on 28 December and delivered on 15 January 1943. Sold for scrapping in March 1965, she was resold and converted to a crane ship by Zidell Explorations Inc., Portland, Oregon for use at Grays Harbor, Washington and was renamed Twin Harbours of Aberdeen.

== Woodrow Wilson ==
Woodrow Wilson was built by North Carolina Shipbuilding Company. Her keel was laid on 26 January 1943. She was launched on 25 February and delivered on 5 March. She was scrapped at Philadelphia in February 1960.

== W. P. Few ==
W. P. Few was built by J. A. Jones Construction Company, Brunswick. Her keel was laid on 1 May 1944. She was launched on 22 June and delivered on 3 July. Built for the WSA, she was operated under the management of Isbrandtsen Co. She became stranded at an unknown location in 1945. Refloated and declared a constructive total loss, she was towed to Mobile and laid up. She was scrapped at Baltimore in 1959.

== W. R. Grace ==
W. R. Grace was built by Bethlehem Fairfield Shipyard. Her keel was laid on 9 September 1943. She was launched on 4 October and delivered on 11 October. She was scrapped at |Philadelphia in January 1966.

== W. S. Jennings ==
W. S. Jennings was built by St. Johns River Shipbuilding Corporation. Her keel was laid on 9 June 1944. She was launched on 25 July and delivered on 9 August. Laid up in the James River post-war, she was scrapped at La Spezia in June 1970.

== W. Walter Husband ==
W. Walter Husband was built by Bethlehem Fairfield Shipyard. Her keel was laid on 27 September 1943. She was launched as W. Walter Husband on 19 October and delivered as Samyork on 29 October. To the MoWT under Lend-Lease. Operated under the management of Andrew Weir & Co. Sold in 1947 to Bank Line and renamed Ivybank, remaining under the same management. Sold in 1959 to Panamanian Oriental Steamship Corp. and renamed Winona. Reflagged to Panama and operated under the management of Wheelock, Marden & Co. Renamed Kondor in 1961. Sold in 1963 to Grand Steamship Co. and renamed Grand. Reflagged to China. She sprang a leak, broke in two and sank in the Pacific Ocean (34°15′N 145°10′E) on 13 January 1965 whilst on a voyage from San Francisco to Kaohsiung.

== W. W. McCrackin ==
W. W. McCrackin was built by Oregon Shipbuilding Corporation. Her keel was laid on 21 September 1943. She was launched on 8 October and delivered on 16 October. Built for the WSA, she was operated under the management of Isthmian Steamship Co. Sold in 1947 to George M. Culukundis, Piraeus and renamed Maria G. Culukundis. Sold in 1952 to A. G. Papadikis, Piraeus. Operated under the management of Freighters & Tankers Agency. Management transferred to the joint management of J. J. Culucundis and Freighters & Tankers Agency in 1953, then to the joing management of J. J. Culucundis and A. G. Pappadikis in 1954. Sold in 1961 to G. Culucundis, Piraeus and renamed Captain George. She caught fire and exploded in the Atlantic Ocean 300 nautical miles (560 km) north west of Bermuda on 14 November 1962 whilst on a voyage from New Orleans to Umm Said, Qatar and was abandoned. She sank at 36°49′N 61°24′W on 18 November.

== Wyatt Earp ==
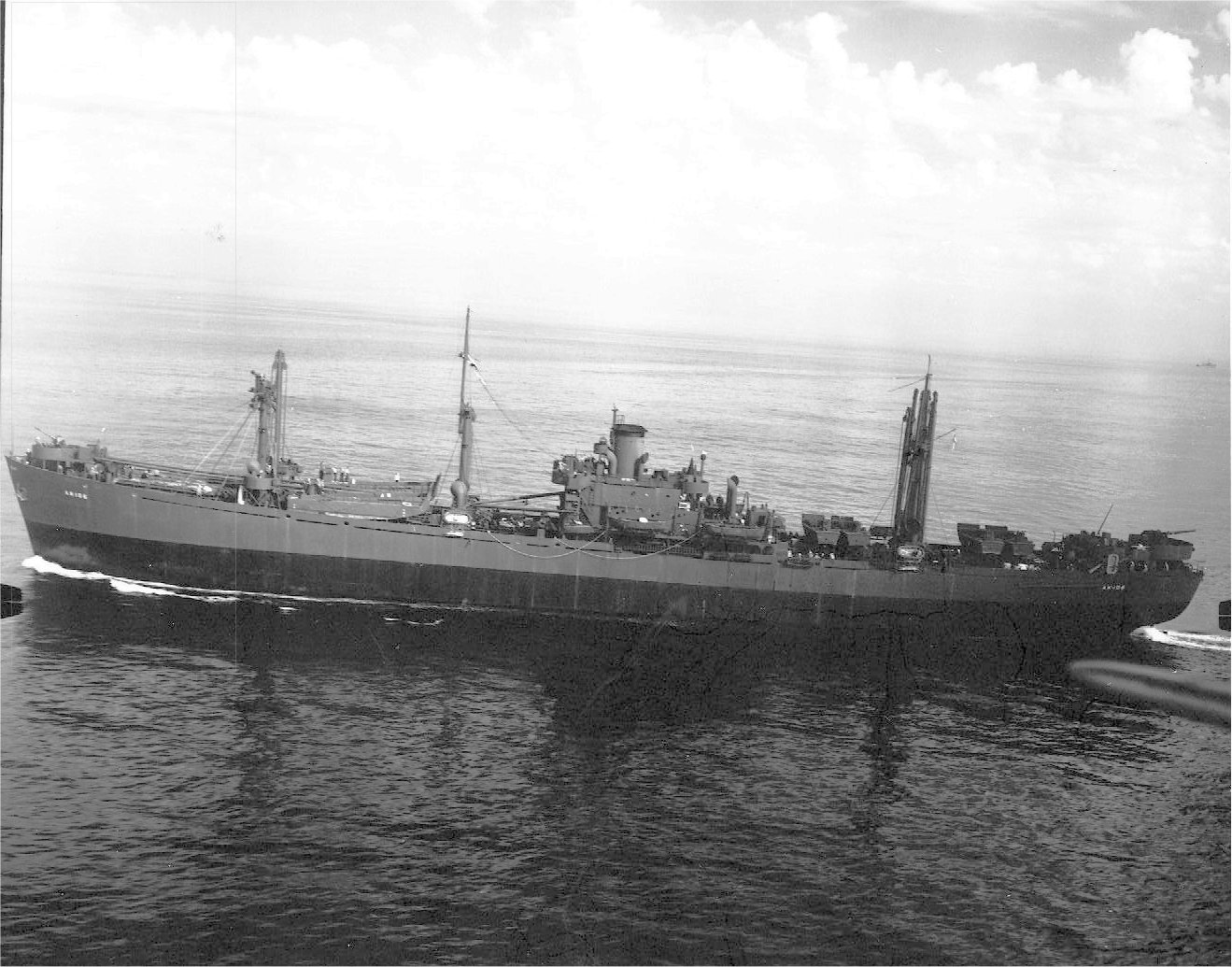
USS Caelum

Wyatt Earp was built by California Shipbuiding Corporation. Her keel was laid on 30 June 1943. She was launched on 25 July and delivered on 10 August. To the United States Navy and renamed Caelum. Returned to the WSA in July 1946 and renamed Wyatt Earp. She was scrapped at Everett in August 1961.

== Wynn Seale ==
Wynn Seale was built by Todd Houston Shipbuilding Corporation. Her keel was laid on 7 June 1944. She was launched on 17 July and delivered on 28 July. She was converted to a crane barge in May 1964 for use at Portland, Oregon and was renamed Zidell's Delight.
