= William Wirt =

William Wirt may refer to:

- William Wirt (attorney general) (1772–1834), attorney general of the United States
- William Wirt (educator) (1874–1938), superintendent of Gary, Indiana, schools
- SS William Wirt, a Liberty ship
