= SS William McKinley =

Liberty ship of World War II

History

United States
- Name: Levi Woodbury, before 14 October 1942; William McKinley, renamed 14 October 1942
- Namesake: Levi Woodbury; William McKinley
- Owner: War Shipping Administration (WSA)
- Operator: American West African Line Inc.
- Ordered: as type (EC2-S-C1) hull, MCE hull 932
- Awarded: 30 January 1942
- Builder: Bethlehem-Fairfield Shipyard, Baltimore, Maryland
- Cost: $1,074,665
- Yard number: 2082
- Way number: 11
- Laid down: 7 December 1942
- Launched: 21 January 1943
- Sponsored by: Miss Edythe Louys
- Completed: 6 February 1943
- Identification: Call sign: KKGA
- Fate: Laid up in Reserve Fleet, 22 October 1945, sold for scrap 12 March 1971

General characteristics
- Class & type: Liberty ship; type EC2-S-C1, standard
- Tonnage: 10,865 LT DWT; 7,176 GRT
- Displacement: 3,380 long tons (3,434 t) (light); 14,245 long tons (14,474 t) (max)
- Length: 441 feet 6 inches (135 m) oa; 416 feet (127 m) pp; 427 feet (130 m) lwl
- Beam: 57 feet (17 m)
- Draft: 27 ft 9.25 in (8.4646 m)
- Installed power: 2 × Oil fired 450 °F (232 °C) boilers, operating at 220 psi (1,500 kPa); 2,500 hp (1,900 kW)
- Propulsion: 1 × triple-expansion steam engine, (manufactured by General Machinery Corp., Hamilton, Ohio); 1 × screw propeller
- Speed: 11.5 knots (21.3 km/h; 13.2 mph)
- Capacity: 562,608 cubic feet (15,931 m^{3}) (grain); 499,573 cubic feet (14,146 m^{3}) (bale)
- Complement: 38–62 USMM; 21–40 USNAG
- Armament: Varied by ship; Bow-mounted 3-inch (76 mm)/50-caliber gun; Stern-mounted 4-inch (102 mm)/50-caliber gun; 2–8 × single 20-millimeter (0.79 in) Oerlikon anti-aircraft (AA) cannons and/or, 2–8 × 37-millimeter (1.46 in) M1 AA guns

SS William McKinley was a Liberty ship built in the United States during World War II. She was named after William McKinley, a member of the Republican Party and the 25th president of the United States, serving from 1897 until his assassination in 1901.

== Construction ==
William McKinley was laid down on 12 December 1942, under a Maritime Commission (MARCOM) contract, MCE hull 932, by the Bethlehem-Fairfield Shipyard, Baltimore, Maryland; she was sponsored by Miss Edythe Louys, an Elementary School Principal, in Fostoria, Ohio, and launched on 21 January 1943.

== History ==
She was allocated to the American West African Line Inc., on 6 February 1943.

On 22 October 1945, she was laid up in the James River Reserve Fleet, Lee Hall, Virginia, needing $27,190 in repairs. On 29 January 1947, she was withdrawn from the fleet for repairs. On 2 June 1954, she was withdrawn from the fleet to be loaded with grain under the "Grain Program 1954", she returned loaded with grain on 10 June 1954. She was withdrawn from the fleet on 21 January 1961, to have the grain unloaded, she returned empty on 2 February 1961. She was withdrawn from the fleet on 26 September 1961, to be loaded with grain, she returned loaded with grain on 20 October 1961. She was withdrawn from the fleet on 24 October 1963, to have the grain unloaded, she's list as returning loaded with grain on 8 November 1963. On 3 December 1963, she's listed as "Released (unable to read) Agriculture", she was most likely unloaded at this time. On 12 March 1971, she was sold for $41,165, to Union Minerals & Alloys Corp., to be scrapped. On 12 May 1971, she was withdrawn from the fleet.

== Bibliography ==
- "Bethlehem-Fairfield, Baltimore MD". www.ShipbuildingHistory.com. 7 August 2021.
- Maritime Administration. "William McKinley". Ship History Database Vessel Status Card. U.S. Department of Transportation, Maritime Administration.
- Davies, James (May 2004). "Specifications (As-Built)" (PDF). p. 23.
- "SS William McKinley".
