= USS Camel (IX-113) =

History

United States
- Name: William H. Carruth; Camel
- Namesake: William Herbert Carruth; The camel
- Launched: 31 October 1943
- Acquired: 22 November 1943
- Commissioned: 22 November 1943
- Decommissioned: 22 May 1946
- Fate: Returned to the Maritime Commission 24 May 1946. Scrapped in 1963 at Tacoma Washington

General characteristics
- Displacement: 3665 tons
- Length: 441 ft 6 in (134.57 m)
- Beam: 56 ft 11 in (17.35 m)
- Draught: 28 ft 4 in (8.64 m)
- Speed: 11 knots
- Complement: 79 officers and men at commissioning, increased later to about 110
- Armament: 1 × 5-inch 38 caliber dual-purpose gun; 1 × 3 in (76 mm) gun; 8 × 20 mm cannons

USS Camel (IX-133), an Armadillo-class tanker, was the second ship of the United States Navy to be named for the camel, a ruminant found in Asia and Africa. She was launched 31 October 1943 as William H. Carruth by California Shipbuilding Corporation, in Wilmington, California, under a Maritime Commission contract sponsored by Mrs. J. Low, was acquired by the Navy 22 November 1943, and commissioned the same day.

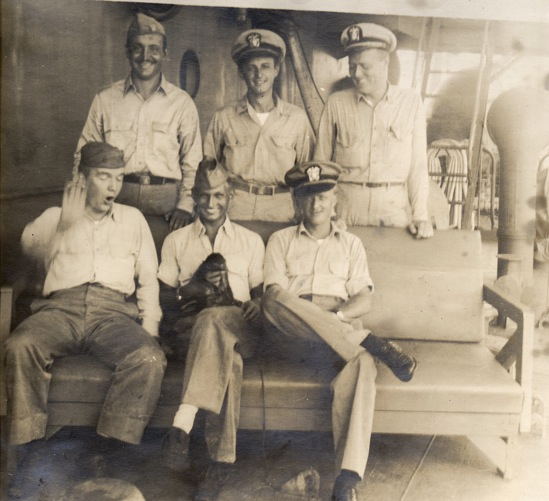
Photo of officers and ship mascot

Camel sailed from San Pedro, California, on 1 January 1944, for Tarawa, where she arrived 24 January to deliver aviation gasoline for use in the aerial reconnaissance missions then flown from that island. From February through August, Camel operated on shuttle service, supplying fleet units and shore installations throughout the Marshall Islands and Mariana Islands with petroleum products. At Saipan, while discharging, Camel discovered two Japanese stowaways, both of whom jumped overboard. One was killed. The survivor told of his hope to reach Hawaii or the United States.

Camel continued to supply the forces on Saipan and Guam from Eniwetok until 27 March 1945, when she cleared Ulithi for the Ryukyu Islands. After serving as station tanker at Kerama Retto from 2 April to 8 July, she sailed to Okinawa as headquarters ship for Service Division 104. During this period, her guns aided in driving off the massive effort of the Japanese to halt the operation by air attacks, and on 6 April she took part in splashing one enemy aircraft.

The tanker returned to the East Coast after occupation duty, was decommissioned at Norfolk, Virginia, 22 May 1946, and was returned to the Maritime Commission 24 May 1946.

Camel received one battle star for World War II service.
