= USS Caelum =

Cargo ship of the United States Navy

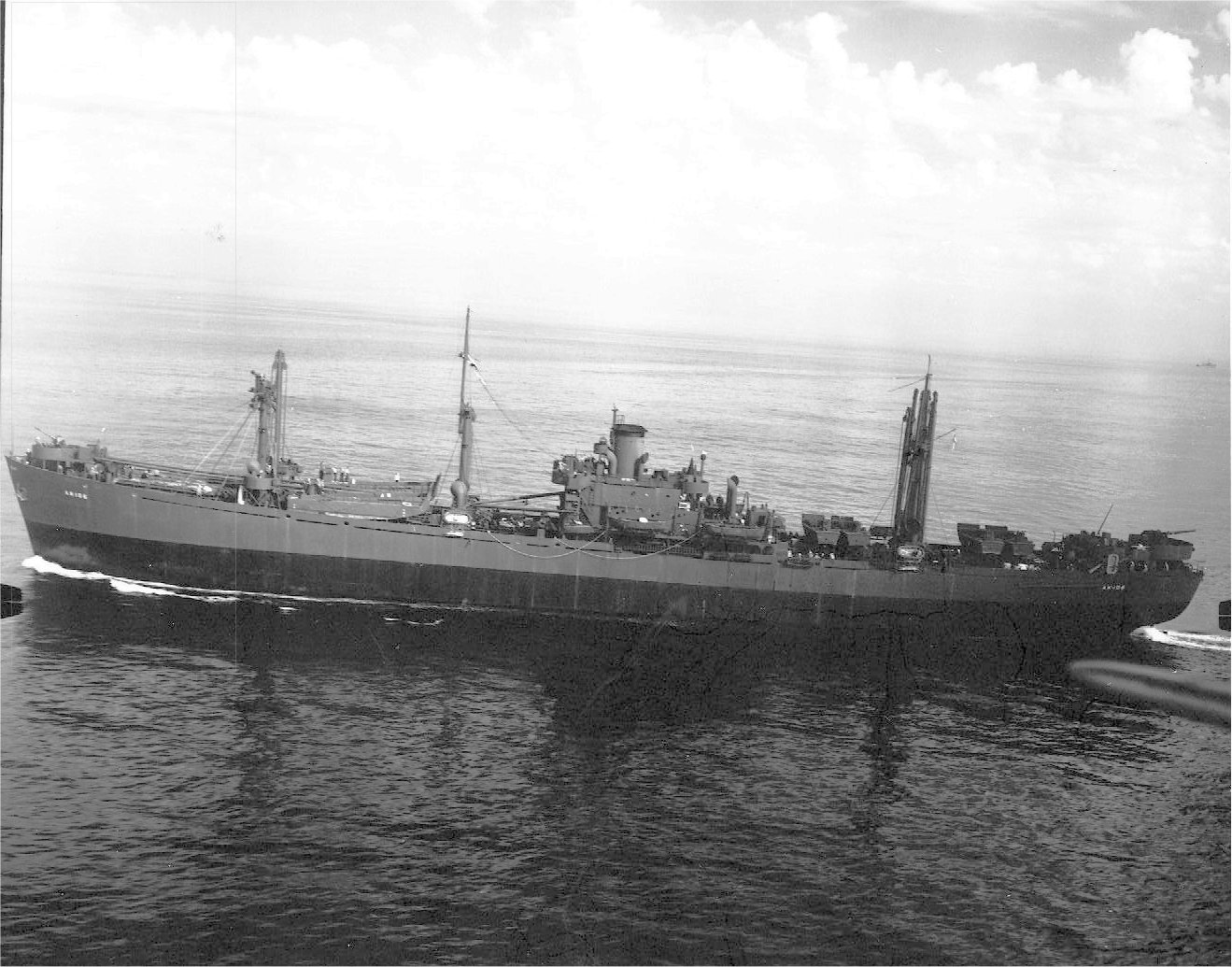
- USS Caelum (AK-106) underway probably in San Francisco Bay.

History

United States
- Name: Wyatt Earp; Caelum
- Namesake: Wyatt Earp; The constellation Caelum
- Ordered: as a Type EC2-S-C1 hull, MCE hull 1860
- Builder: California Shipbuilding Corporation, Terminal Island, Los Angeles, California
- Yard number: 231
- Way number: 5
- Laid down: 30 June 1943
- Launched: 25 July 1943
- Sponsored by: Mrs. H. N. MacKusick
- Acquired: 10 August 1943
- Commissioned: 22 October 1943
- Decommissioned: 30 July 1946
- Stricken: 15 August 1946
- Identification: Hull symbol: AK-106; Code letters: NHLT
- Honors and awards: 1 × battle star
- Fate: Sold for scrapping, 19 October 1961, removed, 26 October 1961, scrapping completed, 2 January 1962

General characteristics
- Class & type: Crater-class cargo ship
- Type: Type EC2-S-C1
- Displacement: 4,023 long tons (4,088 t) (standard); 14,550 long tons (14,780 t) (full load)
- Length: 441 ft 6 in (134.57 m)
- Beam: 56 ft 11 in (17.35 m)
- Draft: 28 ft 4 in (8.64 m)
- Installed power: 2 × Combustion Engineering header-type boilers, 220psi 450°; 2,500 shp (1,900 kW)
- Propulsion: 1 × Joshua Hendy vertical triple-expansion reciprocating steam engine; 1 × shaft
- Speed: 12.5 kn (23.2 km/h; 14.4 mph)
- Capacity: 7,800 t (7,700 long tons) DWT; 444,206 cu ft (12,578.5 m^{3}) (non-refrigerated)
- Complement: 25 officers 196 enlisted
- Armament: 1 × 5 in (127 mm)/38 caliber dual-purpose (DP) gun; 1 × 3 in (76 mm)/50 caliber DP gun; 2 × 40 mm (1.57 in) Bofors anti-aircraft (AA) gun mounts; 6 × 20 mm (0.79 in) Oerlikon cannon AA gun mounts

USS Caelum (AK-106) was a Crater-class cargo ship commissioned by the US Navy for service in World War II. Caelum was named after the constellation Caelum. She was responsible for delivering troops, goods and equipment to locations in the Asiatic-Pacific Theater.

== Construction ==
Caelum was laid down 30 June 1943, under Maritime Commission (MARCOM) contract, MC hull No. 1860, as the Liberty ship SS Wyatt Earp, by California Shipbuilding Corporation, Terminal Island, Los Angeles, California; launched 25 July 1943; sponsored by Mrs. H. N. MacKusick; transferred to the Navy 10 August 1943; commissioned 22 October 1943 and reported to the US Pacific Fleet.

== Service history ==
Assigned to the Pacific Fleet, Caelum carried cargo between Pearl Harbor and Tarawa, Majuro, Eniwetok, Kwajalein, and Ulithi, in her first year of service. Her tireless operations included participation in the occupation of Kwajalein and Majuro in February 1944, and from June through October 1944, she was assigned to Service Squadron 10.

=== Supporting invasion forces ===
A San Francisco overhaul late in 1944, was followed by Caelum's assignment from 20 January 1945, as station ship at Ulithi, and from 8 May, at Guam. At these bases she controlled and issued cargo and provisions to the ships which carried out the massive operations in the Palaus, Philippines, Iwo Jima, and Okinawa, and the task forces which pounded Japanese bases from the air.

=== End-of-war activity ===
Returning to the States for overhaul in June and July 1945, Caelum towed YF-741 to Ulithi in August, and sailed on to support the occupation of Korea in September, and to provide logistic services to ships at Shanghai in early October. From 9 November, when she arrived at Samar, Philippine Islands, the cargo ship sailed from this and various Chinese ports until clearing for the United States 15 April 1946.

== Post-war decommissioning ==
Decommissioned at Seattle, Washington on 30 July 1946, Caelum was returned to the Maritime Commission the next day. She was laid up in the National Defense Reserve Fleet, Olympia, Washington.

== Fate ==
On 19 October 1961, she was sold to Hyman-Michaels Company, for $82,011.11, to be scrapped. Her scrapping was completed 2 January 1962, at National Steel and Shipbuilding Company (NASSCO).

== Awards ==
Caelum received one battle star for World War II service.

== Notes ==
Citations

== Bibliography ==
Online resources

- "Naos". Dictionary of American Naval Fighting Ships. Naval History and Heritage Command. 2 June 2016. This article incorporates text from this source, which is in the public domain.
- "California Shipbuilding, Los Angeles CA". ShipbuildingHistory.com. 13 October 2010.
- "USS Caelum (AK-106))". NavSource. 16 December 2016.
- "WYATT EARP". United States Department of Transportation. Archived from the original on 12 December 2019.
