= SS William R. Day =

Liberty ship of WWII

History

United States
- Name: William R. Day
- Namesake: William R. Day
- Owner: War Shipping Administration (WSA)
- Operator: Marine Transport Lines, Inc.
- Ordered: as type (EC2-S-C1) hull, MCE hull 941
- Awarded: 30 January 1942
- Builder: Bethlehem-Fairfield Shipyard, Baltimore, Maryland
- Cost: $1,073,397
- Yard number: 2091
- Way number: 1
- Laid down: 24 December 1942
- Launched: 12 February 1943
- Sponsored by: Miss Mary Broostek
- Completed: 2 March 1943
- Identification: Call sign: KKAT
- Fate: Laid up in Reserve Fleet, 13 February 1946, sold for scrap, 22 January 1960

General characteristics
- Class & type: Liberty ship; type EC2-S-C1, standard
- Tonnage: 10,865 LT DWT; 7,176 GRT
- Displacement: 3,380 long tons (3,434 t) (light); 14,245 long tons (14,474 t) (max)
- Length: 441 feet 6 inches (135 m) oa; 416 feet (127 m) pp; 427 feet (130 m) lwl
- Beam: 57 feet (17 m)
- Draft: 27 ft 9.25 in (8.4646 m)
- Installed power: 2 × Oil fired 450 °F (232 °C) boilers, operating at 220 psi (1,500 kPa); 2,500 hp (1,900 kW)
- Propulsion: 1 × triple-expansion steam engine, (manufactured by Vulcan Iron Works, Wilkes-Barre, Pennsylvania); 1 × screw propeller
- Speed: 11.5 knots (21.3 km/h; 13.2 mph)
- Capacity: 562,608 cubic feet (15,931 m^{3}) (grain); 499,573 cubic feet (14,146 m^{3}) (bale)
- Complement: 38–62 USMM; 21–40 USNAG
- Armament: Varied by ship; Bow-mounted 3-inch (76 mm)/50-caliber gun; Stern-mounted 4-inch (102 mm)/50-caliber gun; 2–8 × single 20-millimeter (0.79 in) Oerlikon anti-aircraft (AA) cannons and/or, 2–8 × 37-millimeter (1.46 in) M1 AA guns

SS William R. Day was a Liberty ship built in the United States during World War II. She was named after William R. Day, an American diplomat and jurist who served as an associate justice of the Supreme Court of the United States from 1903 to 1922. Prior to his service on the Supreme Court, Day served as United States Secretary of State during the administration of President William McKinley. He also served as a United States circuit judge of the United States Court of Appeals for the Sixth Circuit and the United States Circuit Courts for the Sixth Circuit.

== Construction ==
William R. Day was laid down on 24 December 1942, under a Maritime Commission (MARCOM) contract, MCE hull 941, by the Bethlehem-Fairfield Shipyard, Baltimore, Maryland; she was sponsored by Miss Mary Broostek, and launched on 12 February 1943.

== History ==
She was allocated to the Marine Transport Lines, Inc., on 2 March 1943.

On 13 February 1946, she was laid up in the James River Reserve Fleet, in Lee Hall, Virginia, with $39,000, in damages. On 24 November 1959, she was sold for $73,825 to Walsh Construction Co., for scrapping. She was withdrawn from the fleet on 22 January 1960.

== Bibliography ==
- "Bethlehem-Fairfield, Baltimore MD". www.ShipbuildingHistory.com. 7 August 2021.
- Maritime Administration. "William R. Day". Ship History Database Vessel Status Card. U.S. Department of Transportation, Maritime Administration.
- Davies, James (May 2004). "Specifications (As-Built)" (PDF). p. 23.
- "SS William R. Day".
