= SS William J. Bryan =

Liberty ship of WWII

History

United States
- Name: William J. Bryan
- Namesake: William J. Bryan
- Owner: War Shipping Administration (WSA)
- Operator: Standard Fruit & Steamship Company
- Ordered: as type (EC2-S-C1) hull, MC hull 1522
- Builder: J.A. Jones Construction, Panama City, Florida
- Cost: $2,070,074
- Yard number: 4
- Way number: 4
- Laid down: 21 September 1942
- Launched: 22 April 1943
- Completed: 20 May 1943
- Identification: Call Signal: KLEI
- Fate: Laid up in the National Defense Reserve Fleet, Hudson River Group, 10 June 1946; Laid up in the National Defense Reserve Fleet, Wilmington, North Carolina, 26 March 1948; Sold for scrapping, 20 July 1965

General characteristics
- Class & type: Liberty ship; type EC2-S-C1, standard
- Tonnage: 10,865 LT DWT; 7,176 GRT
- Displacement: 3,380 long tons (3,434 t) (light); 14,245 long tons (14,474 t) (max)
- Length: 441 feet 6 inches (135 m) oa; 416 feet (127 m) pp; 427 feet (130 m) lwl
- Beam: 57 feet (17 m)
- Draft: 27 ft 9.25 in (8.4646 m)
- Installed power: 2 × Oil fired 450 °F (232 °C) boilers, operating at 220 psi (1,500 kPa); 2,500 hp (1,900 kW)
- Propulsion: 1 × triple-expansion steam engine, (manufactured by General Machinery Corp., Hamilton, Ohio); 1 × screw propeller
- Speed: 11.5 knots (21.3 km/h; 13.2 mph)
- Capacity: 562,608 cubic feet (15,931 m^{3}) (grain); 499,573 cubic feet (14,146 m^{3}) (bale)
- Complement: 38–62 USMM; 21–40 USNAG
- Armament: Varied by ship; Bow-mounted 3-inch (76 mm)/50-caliber gun; Stern-mounted 4-inch (102 mm)/50-caliber gun; 2–8 × single 20-millimeter (0.79 in) Oerlikon anti-aircraft (AA) cannons and/or, 2–8 × 37-millimeter (1.46 in) M1 AA guns

SS William J. Bryan was a Liberty ship built in the United States during World War II. She was named after William J. Bryan, a member of the US House of Representatives from Nebraska, a three time Democratic Party presidential nominee, and United States Secretary of State under Woodrow Wilson.

== Construction ==
William J. Bryan was laid down on 21 September 1942, under a United States Maritime Commission (MARCOM) contract, MC hull 1522, by J.A. Jones Construction, Panama City, Florida; she was launched on 22 April 1943.

== History ==
She was allocated to the Standard Fruit & Steamship Company, on 20 May 1943. On 10 June 1946, she was laid up in the National Defense Reserve Fleet, in the Hudson River Group. On 26 March 1948, she was laid up in the National Defense Reserve Fleet, in Wilmington, North Carolina. On 20 July 1965, she was sold for $45,278.78, to Union Minerals and Alloys Corporation, for scrapping. She was removed from the fleet on 20 August 1965.

== Bibliography ==
- "Jones Construction, Panama City FL". ShipbuildingHistory.com. 13 October 2010.
- Maritime Administration. "William Jennings Bryan". Ship History Database Vessel Status Card. U.S. Department of Transportation, Maritime Administration.
- Davies, James (May 2004). "Specifications (As-Built)" (PDF). p. 23.
- "SS William J. Bryan".
