= SS William Tilghman =

Liberty ship of WWII

History

United States
- Name: William Tilghman
- Namesake: William Tilghman
- Owner: War Shipping Administration (WSA)
- Operator: A.H. Bull & Co., Inc.
- Ordered: as type (EC2-S-C1) hull, MCE hull 59
- Awarded: 14 March 1941
- Builder: Bethlehem-Fairfield Shipyard, Baltimore, Maryland
- Cost: $1,081,434
- Yard number: 2046
- Way number: 13
- Laid down: 20 June 1942
- Launched: 7 August 1942
- Sponsored by: Mrs. F.G. Emerson
- Completed: 18 August 1942
- Identification: Call sign: KGIZ
- Fate: Laid up in the National Defense Reserve Fleet, Beaumont, Texas, 26 May 1950; Laid up in the National Defense Reserve Fleet, Olympia, Washington, 6 June 1952; Sold for scrapping, 10 July 1970, withdrawn from fleet, 3 August 1970

General characteristics
- Class & type: Liberty ship; type EC2-S-C1, standard
- Tonnage: 10,865 LT DWT; 7,176 GRT
- Displacement: 3,380 long tons (3,434 t) (light); 14,245 long tons (14,474 t) (max)
- Length: 441 feet 6 inches (135 m) oa; 416 feet (127 m) pp; 427 feet (130 m) lwl
- Beam: 57 feet (17 m)
- Draft: 27 ft 9.25 in (8.4646 m)
- Installed power: 2 × Oil fired 450 °F (232 °C) boilers, operating at 220 psi (1,500 kPa); 2,500 hp (1,900 kW)
- Propulsion: 1 × triple-expansion steam engine, (manufactured by General Machinery Corp., Hamilton, Ohio); 1 × screw propeller
- Speed: 11.5 knots (21.3 km/h; 13.2 mph)
- Capacity: 562,608 cubic feet (15,931 m^{3}) (grain); 499,573 cubic feet (14,146 m^{3}) (bale)
- Complement: 38–62 USMM; 21–40 USNAG
- Armament: Varied by ship; Bow-mounted 3-inch (76 mm)/50-caliber gun; Stern-mounted 4-inch (102 mm)/50-caliber gun; 2–8 × single 20-millimeter (0.79 in) Oerlikon anti-aircraft (AA) cannons and/or, 2–8 × 37-millimeter (1.46 in) M1 AA guns

SS William Tilghman was a Liberty ship built in the United States during World War II. She was named after William Tilghman, the Chief United States circuit judge of the United States Circuit Court for the Third Circuit and Chief Justice of the Supreme Court of Pennsylvania.

== Construction ==
William Tilghman was laid down on 20 June 1942, under a Maritime Commission (MARCOM) contract, MCE hull 59, by the Bethlehem-Fairfield Shipyard, Baltimore, Maryland; she was sponsored by Mrs. F.G. Emerson, the wife of the general manager for Weyerhaeuser Timber Co., in Baltimore, and was launched on 7 August 1942.

== History ==
William Tilghman was allocated to A.H. Bull & Co., Inc., on 18 August 1942. On 26 May 1950, she was laid up in the National Defense Reserve Fleet, Beaumont, Texas. On 6 June 1952, she was laid up in the National Defense Reserve Fleet, Olympia, Washington. On 15 April 1954, William Tilghman was withdrawn from the fleet to be loaded with grain under the "Grain Program 1954", she returned loaded on 5 May 1954. On 7 November 1956, she was withdrawn to be unload, she returned on empty 14 November 1956. She was sold for scrapping on 10 July 1970, to Zidell Explorations, Inc., along with two other ships, for $132,911.08. William Tilghman was withdrawn from the fleet on 3 August 1970.

== Bibliography ==
- "Bethlehem-Fairfield, Baltimore MD". www.ShipbuildingHistory.com. 14 August 2008.
- Maritime Administration. "William Tilghman". Ship History Database Vessel Status Card. U.S. Department of Transportation, Maritime Administration.
- Davies, James (May 2004). "Specifications (As-Built)" (PDF). p. 23.
- "SS William Tilghman".
