= SS William L. Watson =

World War II Liberty ship of the United States

History

United States
- Name: William L. Watson
- Namesake: William L. Watson
- Owner: War Shipping Administration (WSA)
- Operator: Black Diamond Steamship Co.
- Ordered: as type (EC2-S-C1) hull, MC hull 2310
- Builder: J.A. Jones Construction, Panama City, Florida
- Cost: $1,042,645
- Yard number: 51
- Way number: 1
- Laid down: 6 June 1944
- Launched: 13 July 1944
- Sponsored by: Mrs. John Simon
- Completed: 26 July 1944
- Identification: Call Signal: WRQA
- Fate: Sold for commercial use, 17 December 1946

Italy
- Name: Panormus
- Owner: Salvatore Tagliavia, Palermo, Italy
- Acquired: 27 December 1946
- Fate: Sold, 1952

Italy
- Name: Panormus
- Owner: Transmediterranea Soc. di Nav. per Azioni, Palermo, Italy
- Acquired: 1952
- Fate: Sold, 1962

Lebanon
- Name: Al Kheir
- Owner: San Antonio, Inc.
- Operator: Cia. Armatoriale Italiana, Venice, Italy
- Acquired: 1962
- Fate: Scrapped, 1967

General characteristics
- Class & type: Liberty ship; type EC2-S-C1, standard
- Tonnage: 10,865 LT DWT; 7,176 GRT
- Displacement: 3,380 long tons (3,434 t) (light); 14,245 long tons (14,474 t) (max)
- Length: 441 feet 6 inches (135 m) oa; 416 feet (127 m) pp; 427 feet (130 m) lwl
- Beam: 57 feet (17 m)
- Draft: 27 ft 9.25 in (8.4646 m)
- Installed power: 2 × Oil fired 450 °F (232 °C) boilers, operating at 220 psi (1,500 kPa); 2,500 hp (1,900 kW)
- Propulsion: 1 × triple-expansion steam engine, (manufactured by General Machinery Corp., Hamilton, Ohio); 1 × screw propeller
- Speed: 11.5 knots (21.3 km/h; 13.2 mph)
- Capacity: 562,608 cubic feet (15,931 m^{3}) (grain); 499,573 cubic feet (14,146 m^{3}) (bale)
- Complement: 38–62 USMM; 21–40 USNAG
- Armament: Varied by ship; Bow-mounted 3-inch (76 mm)/50-caliber gun; Stern-mounted 4-inch (102 mm)/50-caliber gun; 2–8 × single 20-millimeter (0.79 in) Oerlikon anti-aircraft (AA) cannons and/or, 2–8 × 37-millimeter (1.46 in) M1 AA guns

SS William L. Watson was a Liberty ship built in the United States during World War II. She was named after William L. Watson, the first Agricultural Agent for Duval County, Florida, also active in the Florida 4-H club.

== Construction ==
William L. Watson was laid down on 6 June 1944, under a Maritime Commission (MARCOM) contract, MC hull 2310, by J.A. Jones Construction, Panama City, Florida; she was sponsored by Mrs. John Simon, and launched on 13 July 1944.

== History ==
She was allocated to Black Diamond Steamship Co., on 26 July 1944. On 6 June 1946, she was laid up in the National Defense Reserve Fleet, in the Hudson River Group. On 17 December 1946, she was transferred to the Italian Government, which in turn sold her to Salvatore Tagliavia, Palermo, Italy, on 27 December 1946. She was renamed Panormus. In 1952, she was sold to Transmediterranea Soc. di Nav. per Azioni, Palermo. In 1962, she was sold to San Antonio Inc, reflagged for Lebanon, and renamed Al Keheir. In 1966, she was laid up in Spezia, after developing cracks in her hull. She was scrapped the following year in Spezia.

== Bibliography ==
- "Jones Construction, Panama City FL". www.ShipbuildingHistory.com. 13 October 2010.
- "Liberty Ships – World War II".
- Maritime Administration. "William L. Watson". Ship History Database Vessel Status Card. U.S. Department of Transportation, Maritime Administration. Archived from the original on 12 December 2019.
- Davies, James (May 2004). "Specifications (As-Built)" (PDF). p. 23.
- "SS William L. Watson".
