= SS William H. Welch =

Liberty ship of WWII

History

United States
- Name: William H. Welch
- Namesake: William H. Welch
- Owner: War Shipping Administration (WSA)
- Operator: T.J. Stevenson & Co., Inc.
- Ordered: as type (EC2-S-C1) hull, MCE hull 953
- Awarded: 30 January 1942
- Builder: Bethlehem-Fairfield Shipyard, Baltimore, Maryland
- Cost: $1,064,265
- Yard number: 2103
- Way number: 9
- Laid down: 31 January 1943
- Launched: 10 March 1943
- Completed: 31 March 1943
- Identification: Call sign: KKNL
- Fate: Wrecked 26 February 1944

General characteristics
- Class & type: Liberty ship; type EC2-S-C1, standard
- Tonnage: 10,865 LT DWT; 7,176 GRT
- Displacement: 3,380 long tons (3,434 t) (light); 14,245 long tons (14,474 t) (max)
- Length: 441 feet 6 inches (135 m) oa; 416 feet (127 m) pp; 427 feet (130 m) lwl
- Beam: 57 feet (17 m)
- Draft: 27 ft 9.25 in (8.4646 m)
- Installed power: 2 × Oil fired 450 °F (232 °C) boilers, operating at 220 psi (1,500 kPa); 2,500 hp (1,900 kW)
- Propulsion: 1 × triple-expansion steam engine, (manufactured by Harrisburg Machinery Corp., Harrisburg, Pennsylvania); 1 × screw propeller
- Speed: 11.5 knots (21.3 km/h; 13.2 mph)
- Capacity: 562,608 cubic feet (15,931 m^{3}) (grain); 499,573 cubic feet (14,146 m^{3}) (bale)
- Complement: 38–62 USMM; 21–40 USNAG
- Armament: Varied by ship; Bow-mounted 3-inch (76 mm)/50-caliber gun; Stern-mounted 4-inch (102 mm)/50-caliber gun; 2–8 × single 20-millimeter (0.79 in) Oerlikon anti-aircraft (AA) cannons and/or, 2–8 × 37-millimeter (1.46 in) M1 AA guns

SS William H. Welch was a Liberty ship built in the United States during World War II. She was named after William H. Welch, an American physician, pathologist, bacteriologist, and medical-school administrator. He was one of the "Big Four" founding professors at the Johns Hopkins Hospital. He was the first dean of the Johns Hopkins School of Medicine and was also the founder of the Johns Hopkins School of Hygiene and Public Health, the first school of public health in the country.

== Construction ==
William H. Welch was laid down on 31 January 1943, under a Maritime Commission (MARCOM) contract, MCE hull 953, by the Bethlehem-Fairfield Shipyard, Baltimore, Maryland; she was launched on 10 March 1943.

== History ==
She was allocated to the T.J. Stevenson & Co., Inc., on 31 March 1943.

On 26 February 1944, she was wrecked in Black Bay, Fura Island, at the entrance to Loch Ewe, Scotland, during a heavy storm. Only five of her merchant men and seven of her armed guard sailors were rescued. She was declared a CTL.

== Bibliography ==
- "Bethlehem-Fairfield, Baltimore MD". www.ShipbuildingHistory.com. 7 August 2021.
- Maritime Administration. "William H. Welch". Ship History Database Vessel Status Card. U.S. Department of Transportation, Maritime Administration.
- Davies, James (May 2004). "Specifications (As-Built)" (PDF). p. 23.
- "SS William H. Welch".
- Sawyer, L.A.; Mitchell, W.H. (1985). The Liberty Ships. Bury St. Edmunds, Suffolk, Great Britain: St. Edmundsbury Press Ltd. ISBN 1850440492.
- Williams, Greg H. (2014). The Liberty Ships of World War II. Jefferson, North Carolina: McFarland & Company, Inc. ISBN 9780786479450.
