= SS W. P. Few =

Liberty ship of WWII

History

United States
- Name: W.P. Few
- Namesake: William Preston Few
- Ordered: as type (EC2-S-C1) hull, MC hull 2363
- Builder: J.A. Jones Construction, Brunswick, Georgia
- Cost: $1,035,580
- Yard number: 148
- Way number: 2
- Laid down: 1 May 1944
- Launched: 22 June 1944
- Sponsored by: Mrs. J. Elmer Long
- Completed: 3 July 1944
- Identification: Call Signal: WQAE
- Fate: Laid up in National Defense Reserve Fleet, Mobile, Alabama, 19 April 1946; Sold for scrapping, 18 September 1958

General characteristics
- Class & type: Liberty ship; type EC2-S-C1, standard
- Tonnage: 10,865 LT DWT; 7,176 GRT
- Displacement: 3,380 long tons (3,434 t) (light); 14,245 long tons (14,474 t) (max)
- Length: 441 feet 6 inches (135 m) oa; 416 feet (127 m) pp; 427 feet (130 m) lwl
- Beam: 57 feet (17 m)
- Draft: 27 ft 9.25 in (8.4646 m)
- Installed power: 2 × Oil fired 450 °F (232 °C) boilers, operating at 220 psi (1,500 kPa); 2,500 hp (1,900 kW)
- Propulsion: 1 × triple-expansion steam engine, (manufactured by General Machinery Corp., Hamilton, Ohio); 1 × screw propeller
- Speed: 11.5 knots (21.3 km/h; 13.2 mph)
- Capacity: 562,608 cubic feet (15,931 m^{3}) (grain); 499,573 cubic feet (14,146 m^{3}) (bale)
- Complement: 38–62 USMM; 21–40 USNAG
- Armament: Varied by ship; Bow-mounted 3-inch (76 mm)/50-caliber gun; Stern-mounted 4-inch (102 mm)/50-caliber gun; 2–8 × single 20-millimeter (0.79 in) Oerlikon anti-aircraft (AA) cannons and/or, 2–8 × 37-millimeter (1.46 in) M1 AA guns

SS W. P. Few was a Liberty ship built in the United States during World War II. She was named after William Preston Few, the first president of Duke University.

== Construction ==
W.P. Few was laid down on 1 May 1944, under a United States Maritime Commission (MARCOM) contract, MC hull 2363, by J.A. Jones Construction, Brunswick, Georgia; she was sponsored by Mrs. J. Elmer Long, and launched on 22 June 1944.

== History ==
She was allocated to the Isbrandtsen Steamship Co. Inc., on 3 July 1944. On 19 April 1946, she was laid up in the National Defense Reserve Fleet in Mobile, Alabama. On 18 September 1958, she was sold, along with 35 other Liberty ships, to Bethlehem Steel, for $2,666,680, for scrapping. She was removed from the fleet on 19 February 1959.

== Bibliography ==
- "Jones Construction, Brunswick GA". ShipbuildingHistory.com. 13 October 2010.
- "Liberty Ships – World War II".
- Maritime Administration. "W.P. Few". Ship History Database Vessel Status Card. U.S. Department of Transportation, Maritime Administration.
- Davies, James (May 2004). "Specifications (As-Built)" (PDF). p. 23.
- "SS W.P. Few".
