= SS William Wirt =

Liberty ship of WWII

History

United States
- Name: William Wirt
- Namesake: William Wirt
- Owner: War Shipping Administration (WSA)
- Operator: Alcoa Steamship Co., Inc.
- Ordered: as type (EC2-S-C1) hull, MCE hull 50
- Awarded: 14 March 1941
- Builder: Bethlehem-Fairfield Shipyard, Baltimore, Maryland
- Cost: $1,071,644
- Yard number: 2037
- Way number: 2
- Laid down: 13 May 1942
- Launched: 4 July 1942
- Sponsored by: Mrs. Harmon H. Hoy
- Completed: 24 July 1942
- Identification: Call sign: KGBF
- Fate: Laid up in the National Defense Reserve Fleet, Wilmington, North Carolina, 16 December 1947; Sold for scrapping, 2 November 1965, withdrawn from fleet, 24 November 1965

General characteristics
- Class & type: Liberty ship; type EC2-S-C1, standard
- Tonnage: 10,865 LT DWT; 7,176 GRT
- Displacement: 3,380 long tons (3,434 t) (light); 14,245 long tons (14,474 t) (max)
- Length: 441 feet 6 inches (135 m) oa; 416 feet (127 m) pp; 427 feet (130 m) lwl
- Beam: 57 feet (17 m)
- Draft: 27 ft 9.25 in (8.4646 m)
- Installed power: 2 × Oil fired 450 °F (232 °C) boilers, operating at 220 psi (1,500 kPa); 2,500 hp (1,900 kW)
- Propulsion: 1 × triple-expansion steam engine, (manufactured by Worthington Pump & Machinery Corp, Harrison, New Jersey); 1 × screw propeller
- Speed: 11.5 knots (21.3 km/h; 13.2 mph)
- Capacity: 562,608 cubic feet (15,931 m^{3}) (grain); 499,573 cubic feet (14,146 m^{3}) (bale)
- Complement: 38–62 USMM; 21–40 USNAG
- Armament: Varied by ship; Bow-mounted 3-inch (76 mm)/50-caliber gun; Stern-mounted 4-inch (102 mm)/50-caliber gun; 2–8 × single 20-millimeter (0.79 in) Oerlikon anti-aircraft (AA) cannons and/or, 2–8 × 37-millimeter (1.46 in) M1 AA guns

SS William Wirt was a Liberty ship built in the United States during World War II. She was named after William Wirt, an American author and statesman who is credited with turning the position of United States Attorney General into one of influence. He was the longest serving Attorney General in US history. He was also the Anti-Masonic Party nominee for president in the 1832 election.

== Construction ==
William Wirt was laid down on 13 May 1942, under a Maritime Commission (MARCOM) contract, MCE hull 50, by the Bethlehem-Fairfield Shipyard, Baltimore, Maryland; sponsored by Mrs. Harmon H Hoy, the niece J.A. Bouslog, the manager of the Middle Atlantic District for MARCOM, and was launched on 4 July 1942.

== History ==
She was allocated to Alcoa Steamship Co., Inc., on 24 July 1942. On 16 December 1947, she was laid up in the National Defense Reserve Fleet, Wilmington, North Carolina. She was sold for scrapping on 2 November 1965, to Union Minerals & Alloys Corp., for $46,287. She was withdrawn from the fleet on 24 November 1965.

== Bibliography ==
- "Bethlehem-Fairfield, Baltimore MD". www.ShipbuildingHistory.com. 14 August 2008.
- Maritime Administration. "William Wirt". Ship History Database Vessel Status Card. U.S. Department of Transportation, Maritime Administration.
- Davies, James (May 2004). "Specifications (As-Built)" (PDF). p. 23.
- "SS William Wirt".
