= SS LeBaron Russell Briggs =

World War II Liberty ship of the United States

History

United States
- Name: LeBaron Russell Briggs
- Namesake: LeBaron Russell Briggs
- Owner: War Shipping Administration (WSA)
- Operator: R.A. Nichol & Company
- Ordered: as type (EC2-S-C1) hull, MC hull 2301
- Builder: J.A. Jones Construction, Panama City, Florida
- Cost: $1,001,224
- Yard number: 42
- Way number: 5
- Laid down: 29 March 1944
- Launched: 12 May 1944
- Sponsored by: Mrs. George R. Smith
- Completed: 31 May 1944
- Identification: Call Signal: WKMN
- Fate: Laid up in National Defense Reserve Fleet, Wilmington, North Carolina, 5 March 1948; Laid up in National Defense Reserve Fleet, Hudson River Group, 26 September 1957; Transferred to US Navy, 30 July 1970; Scuttled with load of US Army nerve gas, 18 August 1970

General characteristics
- Class & type: Liberty ship; type EC2-S-C1, standard
- Tonnage: 10,865 LT DWT; 7,176 GRT
- Displacement: 3,380 long tons (3,434 t) (light); 14,245 long tons (14,474 t) (max)
- Length: 441 feet 6 inches (135 m) oa; 416 feet (127 m) pp; 427 feet (130 m) lwl
- Beam: 57 feet (17 m)
- Draft: 27 ft 9.25 in (8.4646 m)
- Installed power: 2 × Oil fired 450 °F (232 °C) boilers, operating at 220 psi (1,500 kPa); 2,500 hp (1,900 kW)
- Propulsion: 1 × triple-expansion steam engine, (manufactured by Iron Fireman Manufacturing Co., Portland, Oregon); 1 × screw propeller
- Speed: 11.5 knots (21.3 km/h; 13.2 mph)
- Capacity: 562,608 cubic feet (15,931 m^{3}) (grain); 499,573 cubic feet (14,146 m^{3}) (bale)
- Complement: 38–62 USMM; 21–40 USNAG
- Armament: Varied by ship; Bow-mounted 3-inch (76 mm)/50-caliber gun; Stern-mounted 4-inch (102 mm)/50-caliber gun; 2–8 × single 20-millimeter (0.79 in) Oerlikon anti-aircraft (AA) cannons and/or, 2–8 × 37-millimeter (1.46 in) M1 AA guns

SS LeBaron Russell Briggs was a Liberty ship built in the United States during World War II. She was named after LeBaron Russell Briggs, the first Dean of Men at Harvard College and the president of Radcliffe College.

== Construction ==
LeBaron Russell Briggs was laid down on 29 March 1944, under a Maritime Commission (MARCOM) contract, MC hull 2301, by J.A. Jones Construction, Panama City, Florida; she was sponsored by Mrs. George R. Smith, daughter of James Addison Jones, and launched on 12 May 1944.

== History ==
She was allocated to R.A. Nichol & Company, on 31 May 1944. On 30 July 1944 she sank British trawler "Braconburn" in a collision off Bell Rock, Arborath (56°35′N 02°10′W). Braconburn was being sent to Scapa Flow to be sunk as a blockship, 6 of her crew were killed. On 5 March 1948, she was laid up in the National Defense Reserve Fleet, in Wilmington, North Carolina. On 26 September 1957, she was relocated to the National Defense Reserve Fleet, in the Hudson River Group. On 8 December 1961, she was withdrawn from the fleet to be loaded with grain under the "Grain Program 1961". She returned loaded with grain to the fleet on 22 December 1961. On 17 June 1963, she was withdrawn from the fleet to have the grain unloaded, she returned empty on 22 June 1963. On 30 July 1970, she was turned over to the US Navy for use in Operation CHASE (Chase 10). On 18 August 1970, she was loaded with 418 steel jacketed concrete vaults, which encased 12,540 US Army M55 rockets containing Sarin nerve gas, and one container of VX gas, and towed out 282 mi (245 nmi; 454 km) east of Cape Kennedy, Florida, where she was scuttled in 16,000 ft (4,900 m) of water.

== Bibliography ==
- "Jones Construction, Panama City FL". www.ShipbuildingHistory.com. 13 October 2010.
- "Liberty Ships – World War II".
- Maritime Administration. "LeBaron Russell Briggs". Ship History Database Vessel Status Card. U.S. Department of Transportation, Maritime Administration. Archived from the original on 12 December 2019.
- Davies, James (May 2004). "Specifications (As-Built)" (PDF). p. 23.
- "SS LeBaron Russell Briggs".
- "NERVE GAS IS SUNK OFF FLORIDA COAST". The New York Times. 19 August 1970.
