= USS Antelope (IX-109) =

Liberty ship of World War II

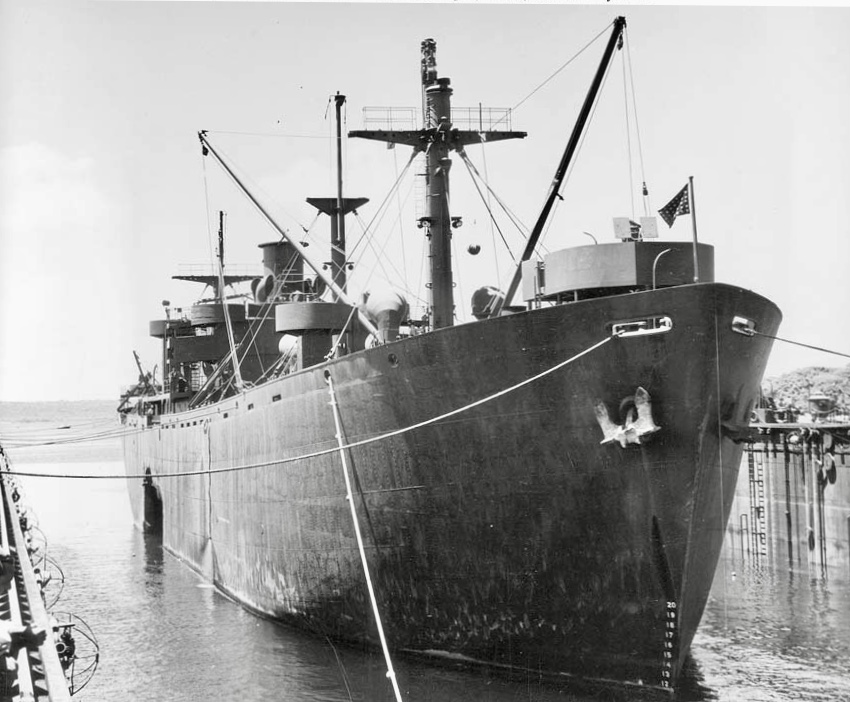
- USS Antelope

History

United States
- Name: M. H. De Young (1942–1943); Antelope (1943–1946)
- Namesake: M. H. de Young; Antelope
- Owner: R. A. Nicol & Company (1943); United States Navy (1943–1946); War Shipping Administration (1946)
- Builder: Permanente Metals
- Laid down: 15 June 1943
- Launched: 6 July 1943
- Sponsored by: Mrs. George T. Cameron
- Acquired: 19 July 1943
- Commissioned: 4 October 1943
- Out of service: 3 May 1946
- Stricken: 21 May 1946
- Identification: Callsign: NJCZ; Hull number: IX-109
- Honors and awards: See Awards
- Fate: Scrapped, 1948

General characteristics
- Class & type: Liberty ship; type EC2-S-C1, standard
- Tonnage: 10,865 LT DWT; 7,176 GRT
- Displacement: 3,380 long tons (3,434 t) (light); 14,245 long tons (14,474 t) (max)
- Length: 441 feet 6 inches (135 m) oa; 416 feet (127 m) pp; 427 feet (130 m) lwl
- Beam: 57 feet (17 m)
- Draft: 27 ft 9.25 in (8.4646 m)
- Installed power: 2 × Oil fired 450 °F (232 °C) boilers, operating at 220 psi (1,500 kPa); 2,500 hp (1,900 kW)
- Propulsion: 1 × triple-expansion steam engine, (manufactured by General Machinery Corp., Hamilton, Ohio); 1 × screw propeller
- Speed: 11.5 knots (21.3 km/h; 13.2 mph)
- Capacity: 562,608 cubic feet (15,931 m^{3}) (grain); 499,573 cubic feet (14,146 m^{3}) (bale)
- Armament: 3 × single 3"/50 cal guns; 8 × single Oerlikon 20 mm cannons

SS M. H. De Young was an American Liberty ship built in 1943 for service in World War II. She was later acquired by the United States Navy and renamed USS Antelope (IX-109). Her namesake was M. H. de Young, an American journalist and businessman from 1865 to 1925.

== Description ==
The ship was 442 ft 8 in (134.92 m) long overall (417 ft 9 in (127.33 m) between perpendiculars, 427 ft 0 in (130.15 m) waterline), with a beam of 57 ft 0 in (17.37 m). She had a depth of 34 ft 8 in (10.57 m) and a draught of 27 ft 9 in (8.46 m). She was assessed at 7,210 GRT, 4,880 NRT, 10,856 DWT.

She was powered by a triple expansion steam engine, which had cylinders of 24.5 inches (62 cm), 37 inches (94 cm) and 70 inches (180 cm) diameter by 70 inches (180 cm) stroke. The engine was built by the Worthington Pump & Machinery Corporation, Harrison, New Jersey. It drove a single screw propeller, which could propel the ship at 11 knots (20 km/h).

== Construction and career ==
M. H. De Young was laid down on 15 June 1943 Richmond, California, by the Permanente Metals Corp., under a Maritime Commission contract (M.C.E. Hull 1587). She was launched on 6 July 1943 and sponsored by Mrs. George T. Cameron. the ship was delivered to the Maritime Commission at 3:15 p.m. on 19 July 1943.

Operated under a general agency agreement by R. A. Nicol & Company, M. H. DeYoung was torpedoed by the Japanese submarine I-19 (the celebrated Cmdr. Kinashi Takakazu, commanding, who had torpedoed and sunk USS Wasp (CV-7), damaged USS North Carolina (BB-55) and caused catastrophic, mortal, damage to USS O'Brien (DD-415) in one spread of torpedoes on 15 September 1942) on 14 August 1943 about 1,000 miles east of Nouméa, New Caledonia, less than a month after being completed. Brought into Espíritu Santo in the New Hebrides, the Liberty ship was partially repaired on board USS Artisan (ABSD-1) and taken over by the Navy under a bareboat charter at 12:01 a.m. on 4 October 1943. She was renamed Antelope (IX-109) and placed in service the day she was taken over.

Antelope had her engines removed and spent the entire war as a non-self-propelled dry cargo storage vessel assigned to Service Squadron 8. Scanty records make it impossible to compile a list of locations at which Antelope served, but Espíritu Santo appears to have been her first duty station and Subic Bay in the Philippines was her last known location while still a naval vessel. It is also possible that she saw some duty at Leyte when support forces established a base there after the Battle of Leyte. In any event, she was inspected at Subic Bay and found to be beyond economical repair and surplus to the needs of the Navy.

Antelope was placed out of service and laid up at Subic Bay at 11:00 a.m. on 3 May 1946 and was simultaneously delivered to the Maritime Commission's War Shipping Administration. Her name was stricken from the Navy Register on 21 May 1946, and, along with 14 other vessels, she was sold for scrapping to the Asia Development Corp., Shanghai, China, on 3 March 1948. The ship was broken up in 1950.

== Awards ==
- Asiatic-Pacific Campaign Medal
- World War II Victory Medal
