= Lucia Russell Briggs =

American college president (1887–1960)

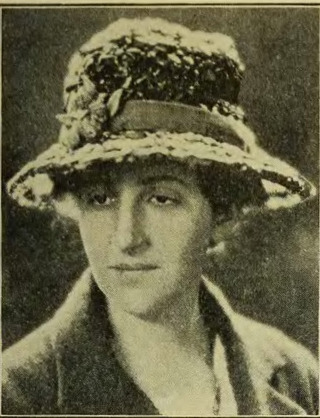
- Briggs, from a Radcliffe College publication
- Born: December 3, 1887; Cambridge, Massachusetts, U.S.
- Died: January 10, 1960 (aged 72); Plymouth, Massachusetts, U.S.
- Occupation: College professor of English
- Known for: President of Miwaukee-Downer College (1921–1951)
- Father: LeBaron Russell Briggs

Lucia Russell Briggs (December 3, 1887 – January 10, 1960) was an American professor of English and the second president of Milwaukee-Downer College in Wisconsin from 1921 to 1951. She also taught at Simmons University in Boston, and was the first woman to be president of the American Association of Colleges.

== Early life and education ==
Briggs was born in Cambridge, Massachusetts, the daughter of LeBaron Russell Briggs and Mary Frances De Quedville Briggs. Her father was dean of Harvard College and president of Radcliffe College. She was named for her grandmother, Lucia Jane Russell Briggs (1821–1881), a pastor's wife who sent money and encouragement to Walt Whitman during the American Civil War.

Briggs graduated from Radcliffe College in 1909, and earned a master's degree there in 1912. She received several honorary doctorates, including from Lawrence College in 1926, from Miami University in 1927, from Rockford College in 1936, and from the University of Wisconsin–Madison in 1949.

== Career ==
Briggs taught school in New York, Massachusetts, and Illinois before becoming a professor at Simmons College in 1915. In 1919 she went to Paris for six months to serve on a French-American war relief committee. In 1921 she succeeded Ellen Clara Sabin to become the second president of Milwaukee-Downer College in Wisconsin. The school's endowment and physical plant grew under her leadership. She retired from the presidency in 1951, and moved back to Massachusetts.

In 1928, Briggs was the first woman to be elected president of the Association of American Colleges. She was president of the Association of Wisconsin Presidents and Deans, also in 1928. In 1929 she gave an address to the annual meeting of the Kansas State Teachers Association.

== Publications ==
- "Students and the Administration" (1928)

== Death and legacy ==
Briggs died in 1960, at the age of 72, at her home in Plymouth, Massachusetts. Her papers are in the archives of Lawrence University. There is a building at Lawrence University, Briggs Hall, and a Lucia Russell Briggs Distinguished Achievement Award, both named for her.
