= SS Furnifold M. Simmons =

World War II Liberty ship of the United States

- The former Furnifold M. Simmons in 1947.

History

United States
- Name: Furnifold M. Simmons
- Namesake: Furnifold McLendel Simmons
- Builder: North Carolina Shipbuilding Company, Wilmington, North Carolina
- Yard number: 66
- Way number: 3
- Laid down: 13 January 1943
- Launched: 10 February 1943
- Renamed: Comet, Ellen Mærsk
- Honors and awards: 1 × battle star
- Fate: Scrapped in 1968

General characteristics
- Type: Liberty ship
- Tonnage: 7,000 long tons deadweight (DWT)
- Length: 441 ft 6 in (134.57 m)
- Beam: 56 ft 11 in (17.35 m)
- Draft: 27 ft 9 in (8.46 m)
- Propulsion: Two oil-fired boilers; Triple expansion steam engine; Single screw; 2,500 hp (1,864 kW)
- Speed: 11 knots (20 km/h; 13 mph)
- Capacity: 9,140 tons cargo
- Complement: 41
- Armament: 1 × Stern-mounted 4 in (100 mm) deck gun; AA guns

SS Furnifold M. Simmons (MC contract 888) was a Liberty ship built in the United States during World War II. She was named after Furnifold McLendel Simmons, a politician from North Carolina responsible for the disenfranchisement of African-American voters in that state, as well as head of a Democratic Party political machine until his death in 1940.

The ship was laid down by North Carolina Shipbuilding Company in their Cape Fear River yard on January 13, 1943, and launched on February 10, 1943. Simmons was chartered to R. A. Nicol & Company by the War Shipping Administration until her sale to Maersk in 1947.

== Cuban Convoy Attacked ==
On March 10, 1943 Simmons was loaded with explosives for Karachi, Pakistan as part of a Key West, Florida to Guantanamo Naval Base KG convoy escorted by United States Navy and Royal Canadian Navy vessels that was attacked by German submarine U-185. The tanker SS Virginia Sinclair had been sunk on March 9 when the U-185 returned and torpedoed the ammunition carrying SS James Sprunt. Flaming debris struck several vessels including the Simmons, causing part of her crew to abandon ship.

== Refloating the SS Fairisle ==
On August 29, 1946, the Simmons was unloading cargo in Calcutta when she was sent to the aid of a stranded vessel, the SS Fairisle, that had grounded due to a navigational error. Reaching the scene of August 31, the crew spent five days attempting to put cables between the two vessels to pull the Fairisle off. The attempt succeeded on September 5, only after part of the Simmons crew had been forced onto the beach when their small boat overturned. Four officers and twenty-seven men sought compensation for their efforts in court from the Waterman Steamship Corporation and were eventually awarded a sum each.

== Mærsk ownership ==
Simmons was purchased by A.P. Møller in 1947 from the War Shipping Administration. At one point she was renamed Ellen Mærsk, then in 1948 Hada County, and finally in 1952 Comet. She was scrapped in 1968.

== Awards ==
The Simmons' Naval Armed Guard detachment received one battle star for World War II service during the invasion of Southern France.

== See also ==
- USAT Cuba
