= David Levy Yulee =

American politician (1810–1886)

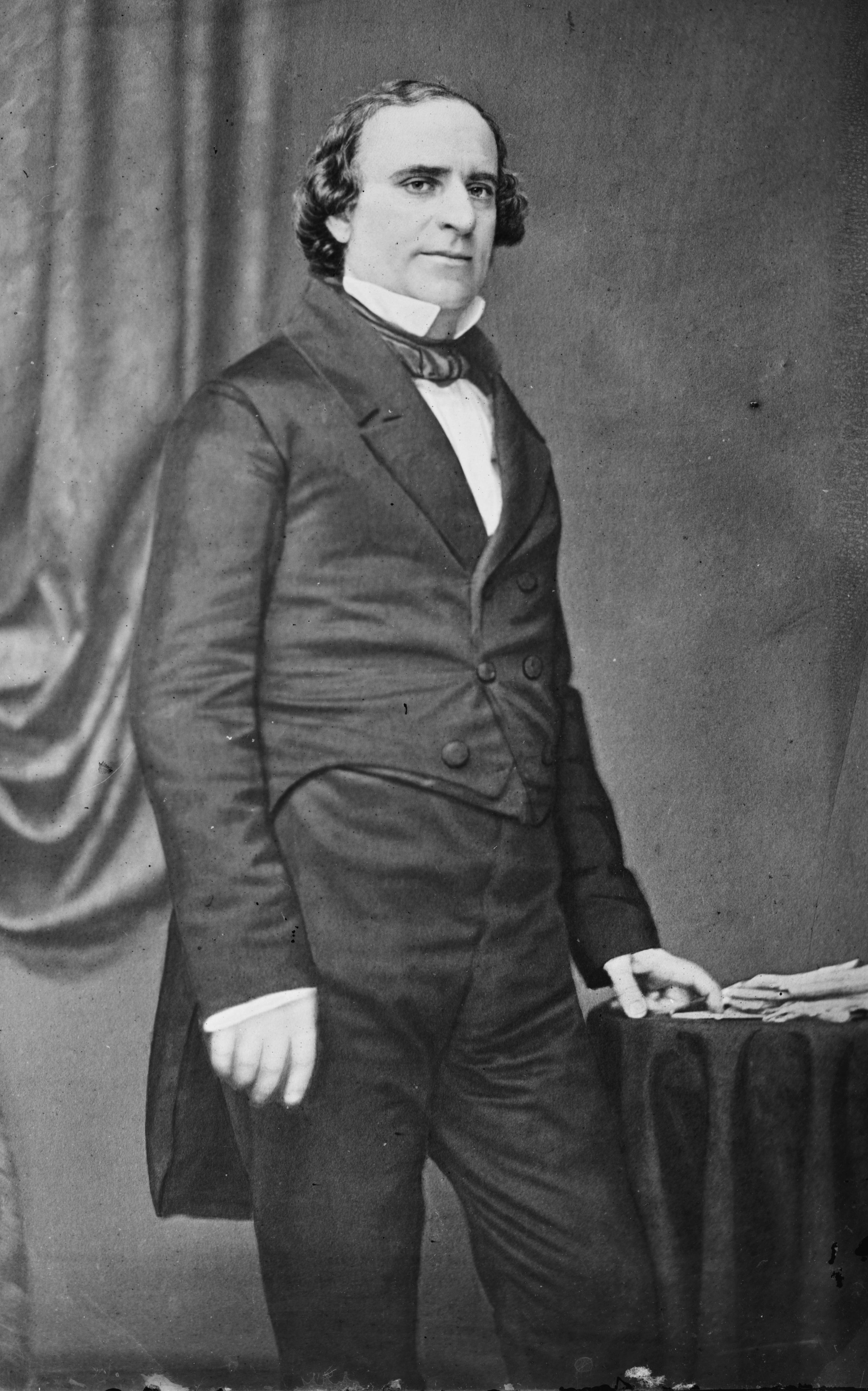
- Yulee (c. 1855–1865)

United States Senator from Florida
- In office March 4, 1855 – January 21, 1861
- Preceded by: Jackson Morton
- Succeeded by: Thomas W. Osborn (1868)
- In office July 1, 1845 – March 3, 1851
- Preceded by: Seat established
- Succeeded by: Stephen Mallory

Member of the U.S. House of Representatives from Florida's at-large district
- Declined to serve 1845
- Preceded by: Himself (Delegate)
- Succeeded by: Edward Cabell (Representative)

Delegate to the U.S. House of Representatives from Florida Territory's at-large district
- In office March 4, 1841 – March 3, 1845
- Preceded by: Charles Downing
- Succeeded by: Himself (Member-elect)

Personal details
- Born: David Levy; June 12, 1810 Charlotte Amalie, Danish West Indies (now U.S. Virgin Islands)
- Died: October 10, 1886 (aged 76) New York City, New York, U.S.
- Resting place: Oak Hill Cemetery; Washington, D.C., U.S.
- Party: Democratic
- Spouse: Nancy Wickliffe
- Relatives: Charles A. Wickliffe (father-in-law)
- Known for: Large‑scale slaveholding (c. 1,000 enslaved); building Florida's first cross‑state railroad using hired enslaved labor; serving in the Confederate Congress.

David Levy Yulee (born David Levy; June 12, 1810 – October 10, 1886) was an American politician and attorney who served as the senator from Florida immediately before the American Civil War. He also founded the Florida Railroad Company and served as president of several other rail companies, earning him the nickname of "Father of Florida Railroads."

Yulee was born on the island of St. Thomas, then under British control, to a Sephardic Jewish family; his father was a trader from Morocco and his mother, also of Sephardi descent, was born in Sint Eustatius and raised in St. Thomas. The family moved to Florida when he was a child. He later served as Florida's territorial delegate to Congress.

Yulee was the first person of Jewish ancestry elected to the United States House of Representatives as well as the first elected to the United States Senate. His historic status as the first Jewish senator is complicated by his extensive slaveholding and his conversion to Christianity, which many historians view as a form of assimilation intended to gain acceptance in the Southern planter elite. His conversion did not, however, insulate him from antisemitic attacks throughout his career. He added Yulee, the name of a Moroccan ancestor, to his name soon after his 1846 marriage to Nancy Christian Wickliffe, daughter of ex-Governor Charles A. Wickliffe of Kentucky. Though Yulee converted to Christianity, became an Episcopalian, and raised his children as Christian, he encountered antisemitism throughout his career.

Yulee was an enslaver who owned over 1,000 people on his Florida plantation, and he was a leading advocate for slavery and the secession of Florida. His fortune came from a sugarcane plantation on the Homosassa River, and his antebellum railroads were largely built by slave labor. After the Civil War, he was imprisoned at Fort Pulaski for nine months for aiding the escape of Confederate President Jefferson Davis. After being pardoned by President Andrew Johnson, he returned to his Florida railroad interests and other business ventures. In 2000, he was recognized as a "Great Floridian" by the state.

== Early life and education ==
He was born David Levy in Charlotte Amalie, on the island of St. Thomas. His father was Moses Elias Levy, a Sephardi Jewish businessman from Morocco who made a fortune in lumber in the British colony. His mother, Hannah Abendanone, was also Sephardi; her ancestors were expelled from Spain to the Netherlands and England. His grandfather Eliyahu ha-Levy ibn-Yuli served as an undersecretary to Sultan Mohammed ben Abdallah while his paternal grandmother Rachel was from Tangiers and was said to have spoken fluent Spanish. Some later migrated to the Caribbean as English colonists during the British occupation of the Danish West Indies (now the United States Virgin Islands). Moses Levy was a first cousin and business partner of Phillip Benjamin, who was the father of Judah P. Benjamin, the future Secretary of State of the Confederate States of America.

After the family immigrated to the United States in the early 1820s, Moses Levy bought 50,000 acres (200 km^{2}) of land near present-day Jacksonville, Florida Territory. Despite his wealth as a trader, his father feared it would lead to sin. He wanted to establish a "New Jerusalem" for Jewish settlers. The parents sent their son to a boy's academy and college in Norfolk, Virginia. Levy studied law with Robert R. Reid in St. Augustine, was admitted to the bar in 1832, and started a law practice in St. Augustine.

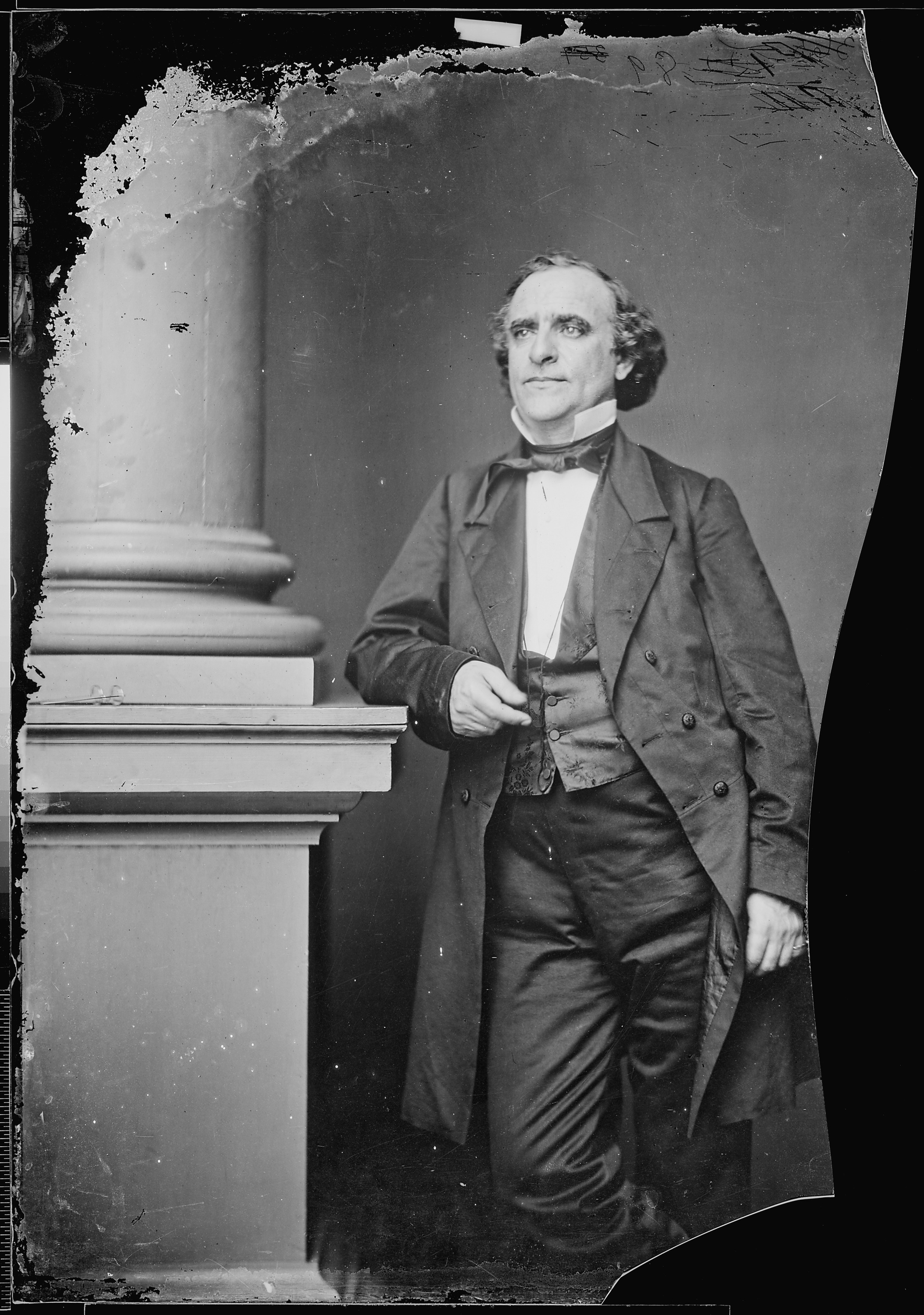
David L. Yulee, photograph by Mathew Brady

== Slaveholder ==
Yulee's fortune came from a 5,000‑acre plantation on the Homosassa River, worked by approximately 1,000 enslaved African Americans who raised sugarcane, citrus, and cotton. A steam‑driven sugar mill on the property supplied sugar to Confederate troops during the Civil War. Yulee also used leased slaves to build his railroads, forcing an estimated 300–400 enslaved people from North Carolina and Virginia to work on the construction.His father, Moses Elias Levy, had also been a large‑scale enslaver; the elder Levy's Pilgrimage Plantation in north‑central Florida was worked by dozens of enslaved people and produced sugar and cotton.

After the Civil War, Yulee was imprisoned for nine months at Fort Pulaski for aiding the escape of Confederate President Jefferson Davis. Upon his release, he returned to his railroad interests but did not compensate the people he had enslaved.

== Early political career ==
During his twenties, Levy served in the territorial militia, including during the Second Seminole War. In 1834, he was present at a conference with Seminole chiefs, including Osceola.

In 1836, Levy was elected to the Florida Territory's Legislative Council, serving from 1837 to 1839. He was a delegate to the territory's constitutional convention in 1838 and served as the legislature's clerk in 1841.

== Florida businessman ==
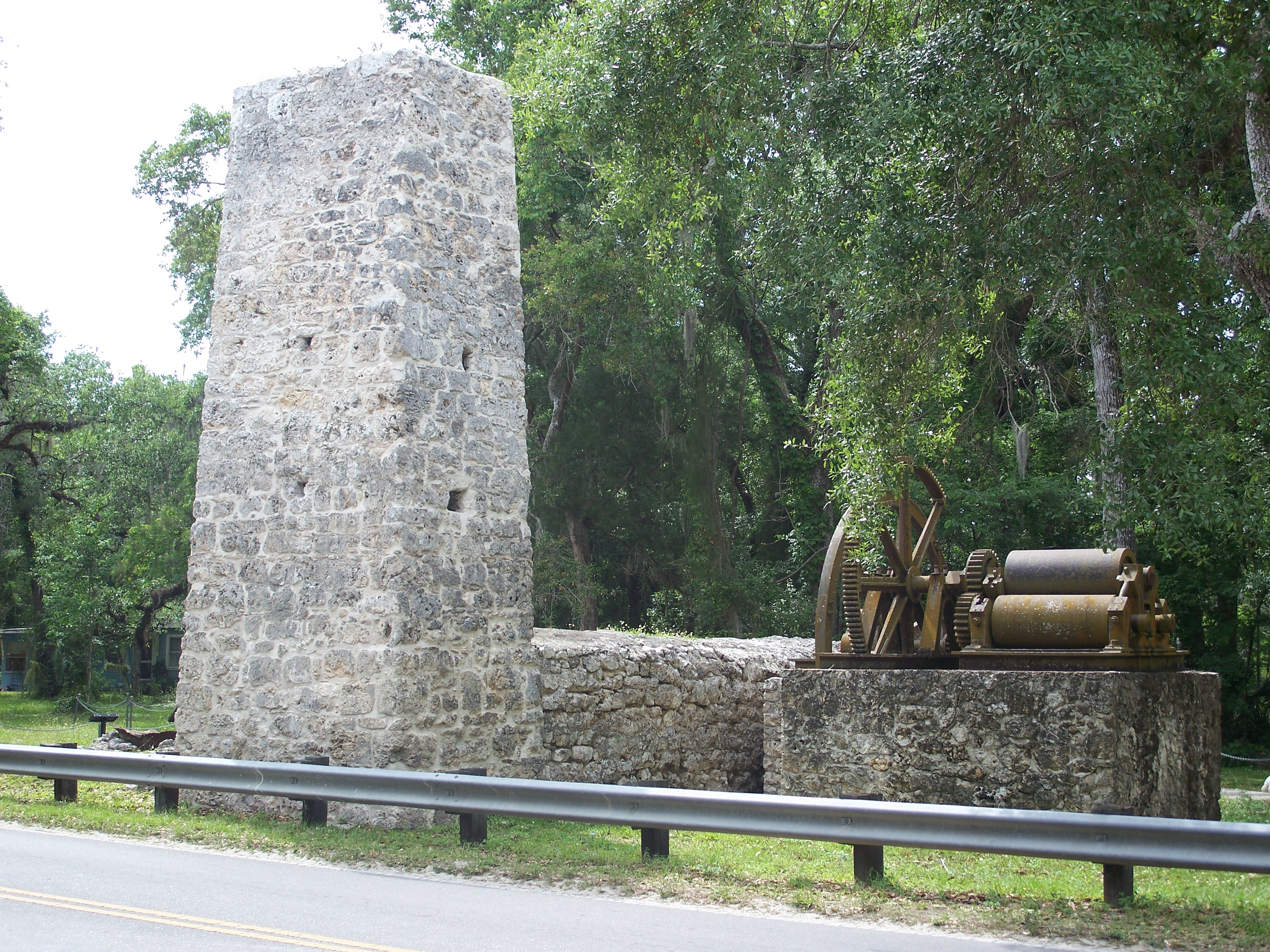
Yulee Sugar Mill Ruins State Historic Site

In 1851, Yulee founded a 5,000-acre (20 km^{2}) sugar cane plantation, built and maintained by enslaved African Americans, along the Homosassa River. The remains of his plantation, which was destroyed during the Civil War, are now the Yulee Sugar Mill Ruins State Historic Site. Yulee was also business partners with John William Pearson at Orange Springs, Florida, but he abandoned his idea of building a railroad in the area as tensions rose and war seemed imminent.

While living in Fernandina, Yulee began to develop a railroad across Florida. He had planned since 1837 to build a state-owned system. He became the first Southerner to use state grants under the Florida Internal Improvement Act of 1855, passed to encourage the development of such infrastructure. He made extensive use of the act to secure federal and state land grants "as a basis of credit" to acquire land and build railroad networks, which were built with slave and Irish immigrant labor through the Florida wilderness.

Issuing public stock, Yulee chartered the Florida Railroad in 1853. He planned its eastern and western terminals at deep-water ports, Fernandina (Port of Fernandina) on Amelia Island on the Atlantic side, and Cedar Key on the Gulf of Mexico, to provide for connection to ocean-going shipping. His company began construction in 1855. On March 1, 1861, the first train arrived from the east in Cedar Key, just weeks before the beginning of the Civil War.

== Political career ==
Levy (still going by that surname) was elected in 1841 as the delegate from the Florida Territory to the United States House of Representatives and served four years. He was seated after his election, but his position was disputed, as opponents argued that he was not a citizen. Levy agreed to suspend his legislative activities pending resolution of this issue in the next Congressional session. By late March 1842 the associated investigations, committee votes, and attempts to bring the issue to a vote in the full House, which included a defense by Levy and testimony from witnesses favorable to him, had not produced a definitive opinion of the House. Levy was allowed to take his seat, and no further attempts were made to contest his claim to it. Once seated in the House, Levy worked to gain statehood for the territory and to protect the expansion of slavery in other newly admitted states.

In 1845, after Florida was admitted as a state, the legislature elected Levy as a Democrat as its first U.S. Representative, but he did not take his seat and was subsequently elected to the United States Senate, the first Jew in the United States to win a seat in the Senate. He served until 1851 (during which period he began using Yulee as his surname). During his first Senate term, he served as chairman of the United States Senate Committee on Private Land Claims (1845–1849) and the United States Senate Committee on Naval Affairs (1849–1851).

In 1855, Yulee was again elected by the Florida legislature to the Senate. He served until resigning in 1861 to support the Confederacy at the start of the American Civil War.

Yulee's inflammatory pro-slavery rhetoric in the Senate earned him the nickname "Florida Fire-Eater". Although he frequently denied that he favored secession, Yulee and his colleague, Senator Stephen Mallory, jointly requested from the War Department a statement of munitions and equipment in Florida forts on January 2, 1860. He wrote to a friend in the state, "the immediately important thing to be done is the occupation of the forts and arsenals in Florida."

== Civil War ==
There is some dispute as to Yulee's wartime legislative service. Some sources state that he served in the Confederate Congress and others do not. A United States Senate document states that Yulee did serve in the Confederate Congress. After the war, Yulee was imprisoned in Fort Pulaski for nine months for treason, specifically for aiding in the 1865 escape of Jefferson Davis.

== Reconstruction ==
After receiving a pardon and being released from confinement, Yulee returned to Florida and rebuilt the Yulee Railroad, which had been destroyed by warfare. He served as president of the Florida Railroad Company from 1853 to 1866, as well as president of the Peninsular Railroad, Tropical Florida Railway, and Fernandina and Jacksonville Railroad companies. His development of the railroads in Florida was his most important achievement and contribution to the state. He was called the "Father of Florida Railroads". His leadership helped increase economic development in the state, including the late nineteenth-century tourist trade. In 1870 Yulee hosted President Ulysses S. Grant in Fernandina.

== Marriage and family ==
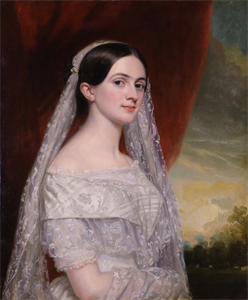
Portrait of Nancy Yulee, née Wickliffe, by Healy (1846).

In 1846, Levy officially changed his name to David Levy Yulee by an act of the Florida Legislature, adding his father's Sephardic surname. That year he married Nancy Christian Wickliffe, the daughter of Charles A. Wickliffe, the former governor of Kentucky and Postmaster General under President John Tyler. His wife was Christian, and they raised their children in her faith. Levy was a second cousin of U.S. Senator from Louisiana Judah P. Benjamin.

=== Death and legacy ===
Selling the Florida Railroad, he retired in 1880 with his wife to Washington, D.C., where she had a family. Yulee died on October 10, 1886, at the Clarendon Hotel in New York City. Yulee was buried at Oak Hill Cemetery in Washington, D.C.

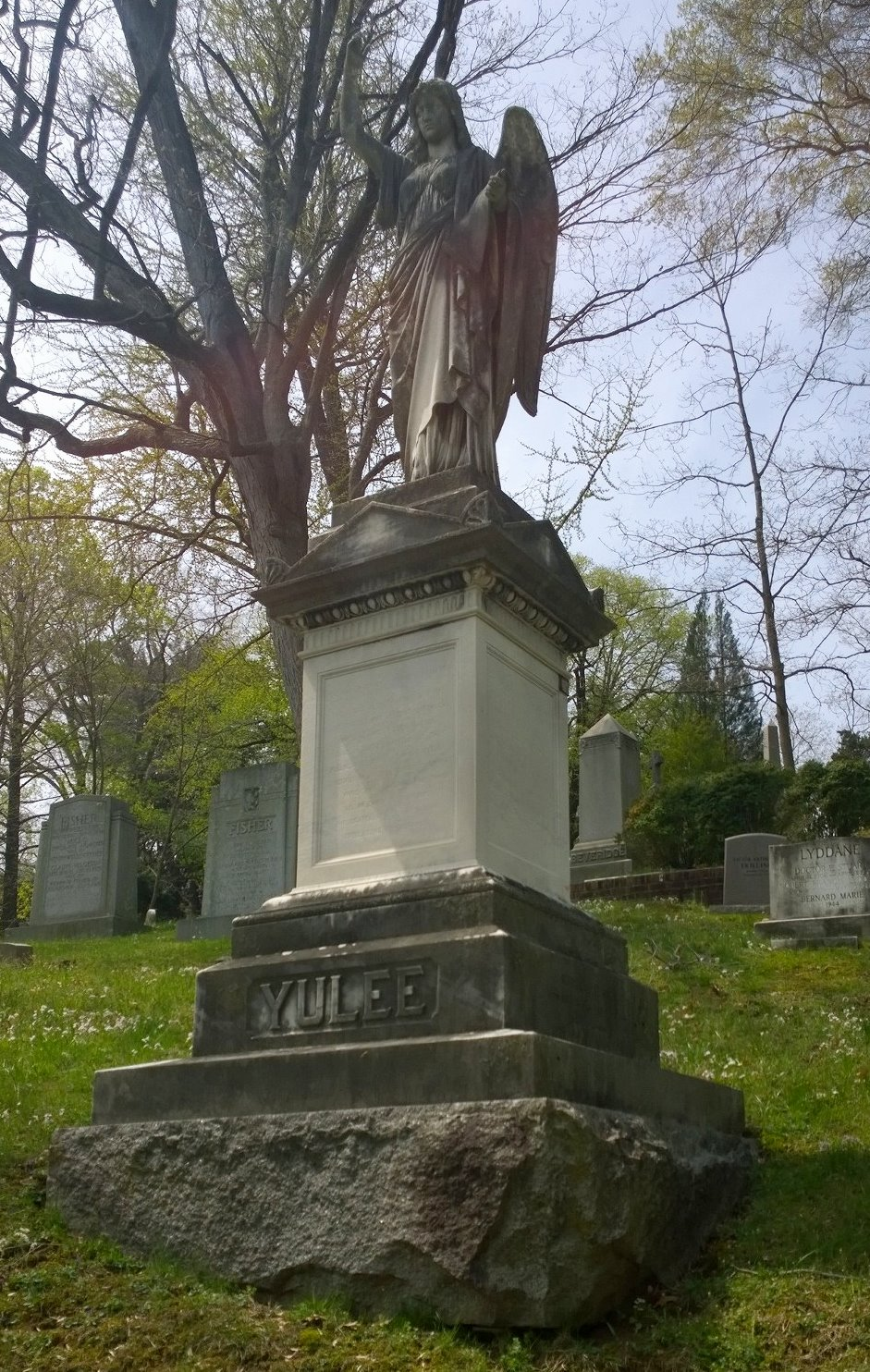
Yulee gravesite

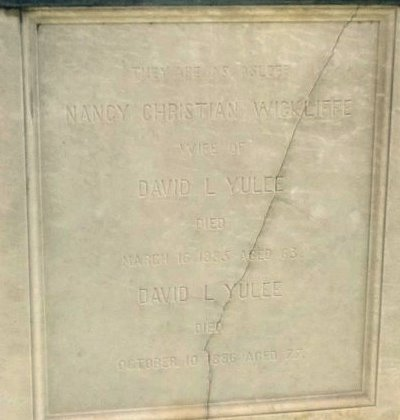
Memorial inscription

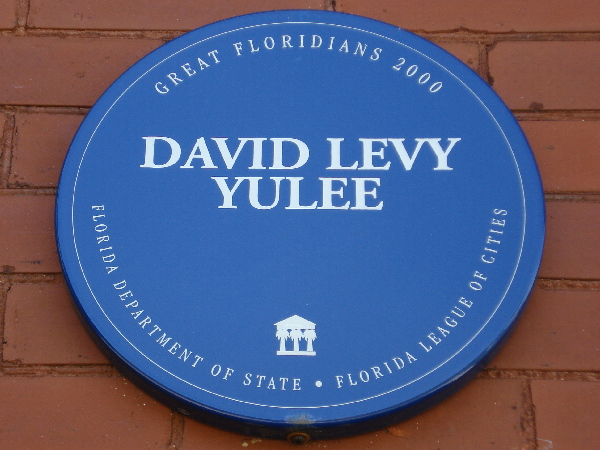

- Both the town of Yulee, Florida and Levy County, Florida are named for him.
- The town of Fernandina Beach, Florida has a statue of Yulee.
- In 2000, the Florida Department of State designated Levy Yulee as a Great Floridian in the Great Floridians 2000 Program. Award plaques in his honor were installed at both the Fernandina Chamber of Commerce and the Yulee Sugar Mill Ruins State Historic Site.
- The World War II Liberty Ship SS David L. Yulee was named in his honor.

== See also ==
- List of Hispanic and Latino Americans in the United States Congress
- List of Jewish members of the United States Congress
- List of United States senators born outside the United States

== Archival material ==
The George A. Smathers Libraries at the University of Florida have a collection of David Levy Yulee Papers (1842–1886). Some of the material has been digitized.

U.S. House of Representatives
Preceded by Charles Downing	Delegate to the U.S. House of Representatives from Florida Territory's at-large congressional district 1841–1845	Succeeded by Himself as U.S. Representative-elect
Preceded by Himself as U.S. Delegate	Member-elect of the U.S. House of Representatives from Florida's at-large congressional district 1845	Succeeded by Edward Cabell as U.S. Representative
U.S. Senate
New seat	United States Senator (Class 1) from Florida; 1845–1851; Served alongside: James Westcott, Jackson Morton	Succeeded by Stephen Mallory
Preceded by Jackson Morton	United States Senator (Class 3) from Florida; 1855–1861; Served alongside: Stephen Mallory	Vacant Title next held by Thomas W. Osborn; 1868
