= LeBaron Russell Briggs =

American educator (1855–1934)

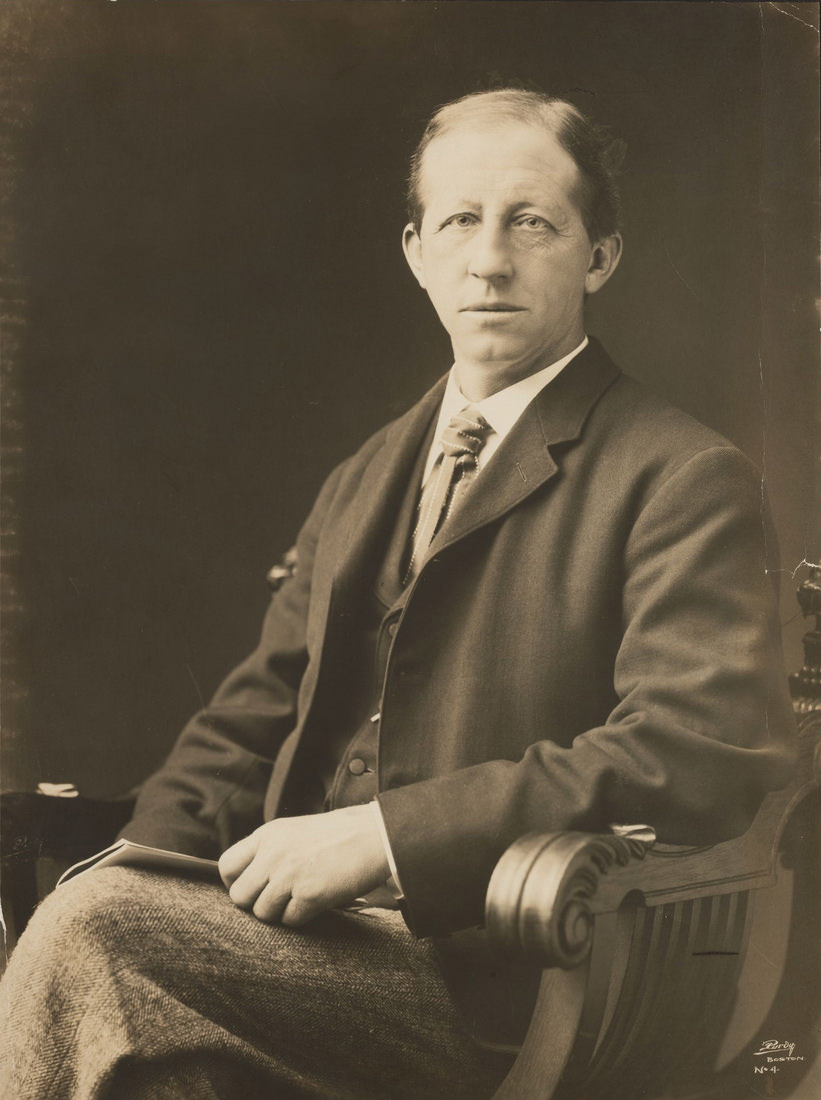

2nd President of Radcliffe College
- In office 1903–1923
- Preceded by: Elizabeth Cabot Agassiz
- Succeeded by: Ada Louise Comstock

Dean of Harvard College
- In office 1891–1902
- Preceded by: Clement Lawrence Smith
- Succeeded by: Byron Hurlbut

Personal details
- Born: December 11, 1855 Salem, Massachusetts, U.S.
- Died: April 24, 1934 (aged 78) Milwaukee, Wisconsin, U.S.
- Spouse: Mary Frances De Quedville (m. 1883)
- Education: Harvard University

LeBaron Russell Briggs (December 11, 1855 – April 24, 1934) was an American educator. He was appointed the first dean of men at Harvard College, and subsequently served as dean of the faculty until he retired. He was concurrently president of Radcliffe College and the National Collegiate Athletic Association.

== Early life ==
Briggs was born in Salem, Massachusetts on December 11, 1855. He was the son of Unitarian minister George Ware Briggs and Lucia Jane (née Russell) Briggs. Among his siblings was brother George Russell Briggs.

He received A.B. (in 1875) and A.M. degrees (in 1882) from Harvard University.

== Career ==
After graduating from Harvard, he began teaching there; he began as a Greek tutor before moving to English, eventually becoming the Boylston Professor of Rhetoric from 1904 until 1925.

Briggs was appointed dean of Harvard College in 1891 (to 1902) and dean of the Faculty of Arts and Sciences from 1902 until his retirement in 1925. His appointment as dean of men was the first "student personnel" appointment, which later became the catalyst for the Student Affairs field in higher education. Briggs was responsible for advising students academically, and on personal issues. "His fairness in dealing with the Faculty and students alike, his patience in dealing with erring undergraduates, and his always kindly humor endeared him to everyone," wrote George Henry Chase. (Note: According to Chase a Harvard undergraduate, having knocked a Yale student unconscious late at night after a football game, rushed to Briggs' home and declared, "Dean Briggs, I've killed a Yale man in the Yard". Briggs replied, "Why bother me at this time of night? Come to the office Monday morning and collect the customary bounty.")

=== Radcliffe College ===
In 1903, Briggs succeeded co-founder Elizabeth Cary Agassiz as the second president of Radcliffe College, which had been founded as the Society for the Collegiate Instruction of Women in 1882 before becoming Radcliffe College in 1894. During his presidency (which was then a part-time position), the college purchased the Greenleaf estate and built five new dormitories. Also during his tenure, the student body grew from less than 500 in 1903 to more than 700 in 1923. The geographical diversity of students also increased, with the number of students matriculating from outside of Massachusetts rising from 19 percent in 1903 to 33 percent in 1923.

He served as president for twenty years until 1923, when he was succeeded by Ada Louise Comstock who also served as president for twenty years from 1923 to 1943. Before Briggs left office, the administration of Radcliffe requested that Radcliffe become a college for women within Harvard, but were again refused. In his last presidential report, Briggs wrote: “I believe that ultimately Radcliffe will become a women’s college in Harvard, but that neither institution is as yet prepared for such a union.”

After his retirement from Radcliffe, he wrote the novel, Men, Women And Colleges, which was published in 1925 by the Houghton Mifflin Company.

== Personal life ==
In 1883, Briggs was married to Mary Frances De Quedville (b. 1862) of Cambridge. Together, they were the parents of three children:

- John DeQuedville Briggs (1885–1965), who married Marjorie Scott Winslow (1900–1994), daughter of William Herman Winslow, in 1925.
- Lucia Russell Briggs (1887–1960), who served as president of Milwaukee-Downer College for thirty years.
- LeBaron Russell Briggs Jr. (1895–1972), who married Elizabeth Mason.

Briggs died on April 24, 1934, in Milwaukee, Wisconsin, at the home of his daughter Lucia. He was buried at Oak Grove Cemetery in Plymouth, Massachusetts, where he had a summer home.

=== Legacy ===
Briggs was also a trustee of Middlesex School, where the LeBaron Briggs House dormitory is named for him, as is Briggs Hall at Harvard's Cabot House. He received honorary degrees from Harvard, Yale, Western Reserve University and Lafayette University.

His nautical namesake, the liberty ship LeBaron Russell Briggs, was scuttled with its cargo of nerve gas on August 18, 1970, as the last installment of a project in which the United States disposed of much of its stockpile by dumping it at sea.
