= Ellen Clara Sabin =

American educator (1850–1949)

- Formal portrait, 1914
- Born: November 29, 1850; Sun Prairie, Wisconsin
- Died: February 3, 1949 (aged 98); Madison, Wisconsin
- Education: Attended University of Wisconsin
- Occupation: Educator

Ellen Clara Sabin (November 29, 1850 – February 3, 1949; also known as Ella) was the president of the Milwaukee-Downer College in the U.S. state of Wisconsin from 1891 to 1921. She was a well-known advocate for the education of women. Sabin developed her own curriculum and teaching style which she practiced in both Wisconsin and Oregon before accepting the position as college president at Downer College.

"‘Education is liberation, and it may free women only from her ignorance, littleness, weakness, and fears.’" - Ellen Sabin.

== Early life ==
Sabin was born November 29, 1850, in Sun Prairie, Wisconsin, to Samuel H. and Adelia Bordine Sabin. When she was an infant, her family moved to California as part of the gold rush, and returned to Wisconsin in 1854. As the oldest of 11 children, Sabin was often responsible for her siblings. She, Ella Wheeler Wilcox, and Clara Bewick Colby were close childhood friends.

At the age of fifteen, Sabin enrolled in the University of Wisconsin. She was among the first women admitted to the university. At the university, she did not pursue any specific course of study. While attending college, she began teaching at the Sun Prairie Grade School in her hometown which was near the university. Sabin left the university after three years without graduating, accepted a job teaching seventh grade in Madison, Wisconsin. By the time Sabin was nineteen, she was the principal of the Fourth Ward School.

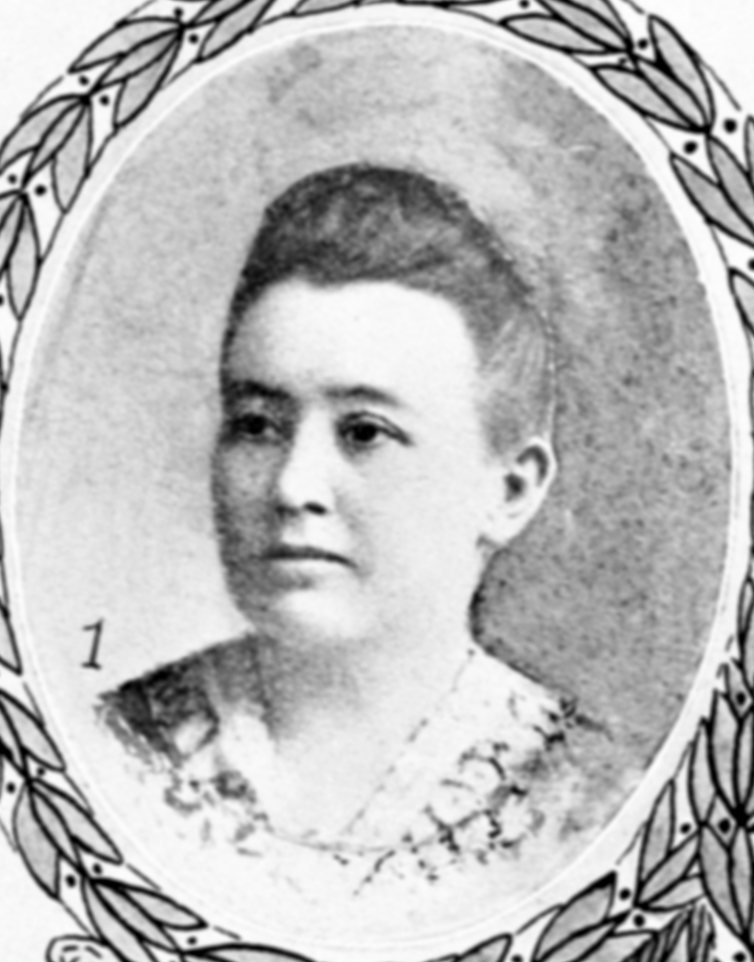

== Oregon educator ==
In 1872, Sabin moved with her family to Eugene, Oregon. She found the education system in Eugene unsatisfactory so she begin independently teaching the community. She began by teaching her siblings and a few neighbors. After a short while, her opened a private school with thirty children. A year later, she moved to Portland where she became the principal of a school known at the time as the Old North School of Portland. Sabin later became superintendent of Portland Public Schools and principal of the high school, overseeing 84 teachers and serving between 6,000 and 7,000 students. She was the first woman to hold a principal position in the Pacific Northwest.

== College president ==
News of Sabin's success in Portland reached Sabra Warner Lewis, an acquaintance of Sabin's back in Wisconsin. Although she had always specialized in elementary education, Sabin was contacted by Lewis’s brother, a trustee of a "small backwoods college in Wisconsin" known as Downer College for Women in Fox Lake, Wisconsin. Downer was in need of someone to take over the school's presidency. Even though Downer offered her twice the salary they had paid to any previous president, it was still substantially less than she was making in Portland. So when Sabin decided to accept the position of college president, she took a major decrease in pay.

After accepting the position of president in 1890, Sabin spent the next thirty years leading the Downer College and its successor institution. In 1895, Downer College merged with Milwaukee College, becoming Milwaukee-Downer College. Sabin continued as president of the new institution.

For many years, Milwaukee-Downer was one of the few colleges in Wisconsin that admitted women. To ensure women students got a quality education, Sabin developed a curriculum that taught women a wide range of practical subjects. She was quoted in 1895 saying, "A strong course of study will be provided, which will be equivalent in work to any of the leading female colleges in the country. Greek, Latin, French, and German will be taught." She also put emphasis on history and literature; however, mathematics was not a priority. Over the years, Sabin continued to introduce progressive and practical classes that were rarely offered to women, including physical education classes, despite the old fear the women were "too fragile" for such courses. Sabin was firm in setting goals for the women and strict courses so they could advance to their careers as rapidly, but also as well-prepared, as possible. She was an active part of the students lives, she would sit in on multiple classes to observe the teachings. Sabin was also known to "personally review each student’s program of study." Sabin was known to be strict towards her students but they recognized that it was out of concern for their education. She was regarded as being able to "scould beautifully."

While Sabin never graduated from college, she was awarded three honorary degrees from University of Wisconsin–Madison, Beloit College, and Grinnell College. She was also helped organize the Wisconsin Federation of Women's Clubs in 1896. That organization served as an important source of funding for many women's educational programs.

Sabin remained president of Milwaukee-Downer College until 1921, when she was succeeded by Lucia Russell Briggs. She was then honored as president emerita from 1921 to 1949. After she retired, Sabin moved to Madison. She died there on February 3, 1949.

== Role in women's education ==
Although higher education of women was an important issue to Sabin, it was still highly controversial during her time of presidency. Concerns circling women's education included belief that the female mind was not as apt to process information as a male's. From this "strain" of higher education, it was thought that women would become weak and lose the ability to produce healthy offspring. Furthermore, it was believed that if women were educated into college, women would hold higher positions and neglect any housework or housewife position and homes would fall-into disarray. Some women’s colleges at this time did not focus on "practical" and "classical" curriculum like Milwaukee-Downer, but rather, "preparing [women] for intelligent motherhood and properly subservient wifehood." As mentioned previously, the Sabin administration strived to teach women more "rigorous" courses of study and have an advanced and broad range of topics so to fully educate the female mind.

Sabin was the first female school principal in the Pacific Northwest, and later became Portland's school superintendent. In 1886 she led a successful effort to incorporate a night school into Portland's public school system. The night school, which had been founded by the Portland Woman's Union, was founded primarily to provide educational opportunities for wage-earning girls.
