= Elizabeth Cabot Agassiz =

American naturalist and educator (1822–1907)

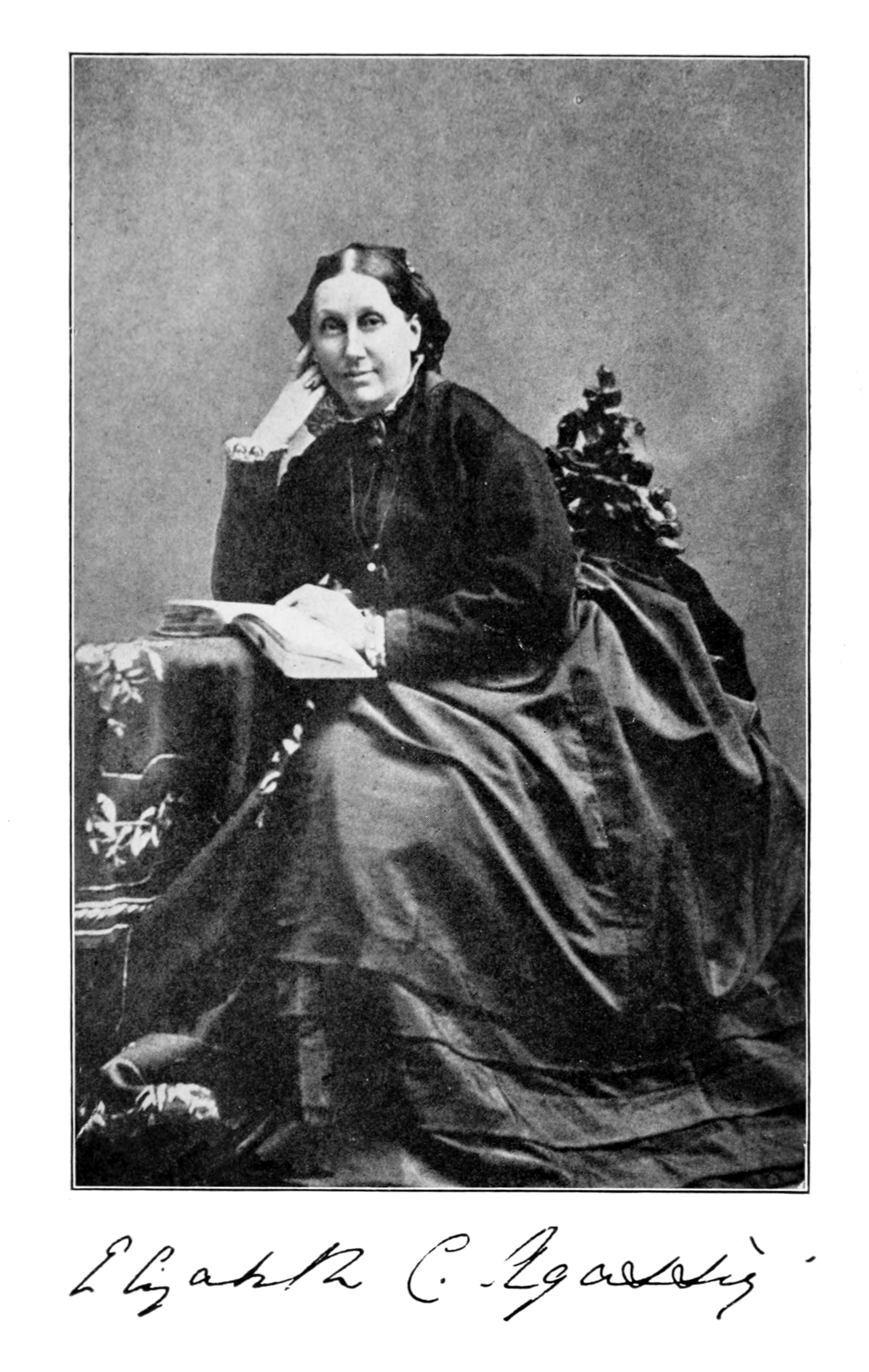

1st President of Radcliffe College
- In office 1882–1903
- Succeeded by: LeBaron Russell Briggs

Personal details
- Born: Elizabeth Cabot Cary; December 5, 1822 Boston, Massachusetts, U.S.
- Died: June 27, 1907 (aged 84) Arlington, Massachusetts, U.S.
- Spouse: Louis Agassiz (m. 1850; died 1873)
- Parent(s): Thomas Graves Cary; Mary Ann Cushing Perkins
- Relatives: Thomas Handasyd Perkins (grandfather)

Elizabeth Cabot Agassiz (pseudonym, Actaea; née Cary; December 5, 1822 – June 27, 1907) was an American educator, naturalist, writer, and the co-founder and first president of Radcliffe College. A researcher of natural history, she was an author and illustrator of natural history texts as well as a co-author of natural history texts with her husband, Louis Agassiz, and her stepson Alexander Agassiz.

Agassiz traveled to Brazil with her husband from 1865 to 1866, and on the Hassler expedition from 1871 to 1872; of the second, she wrote an account for the Atlantic Monthly. She published A First Lesson in Natural History (Boston, 1859) and edited Geological Sketches (1866).

== Early life and education ==
Elizabeth Cabot Cary was born on December 5, 1822, into a Boston Brahmin family of New England ancestry. She was born at the house of her grandfather, Thomas Handasyd Perkins, on Pearl Street in Boston, Massachusetts. Her parents were Mary Ann Cushing Perkins Cary and Thomas Graves Cary (who had graduated from Harvard University in 1811).

The Cary and Perkins families were from England and came to Massachusetts during the seventeenth century. Elizabeth Cary was the second of five daughters and seven children and was referred to as "Lizzie" by her immediate family and close friends. Because of her fragile health, she was tutored at home in Temple Place, Boston, which included the study of languages, drawing, music, and reading. She additionally received informal history lessons from Elizabeth Peabody.

== Career ==
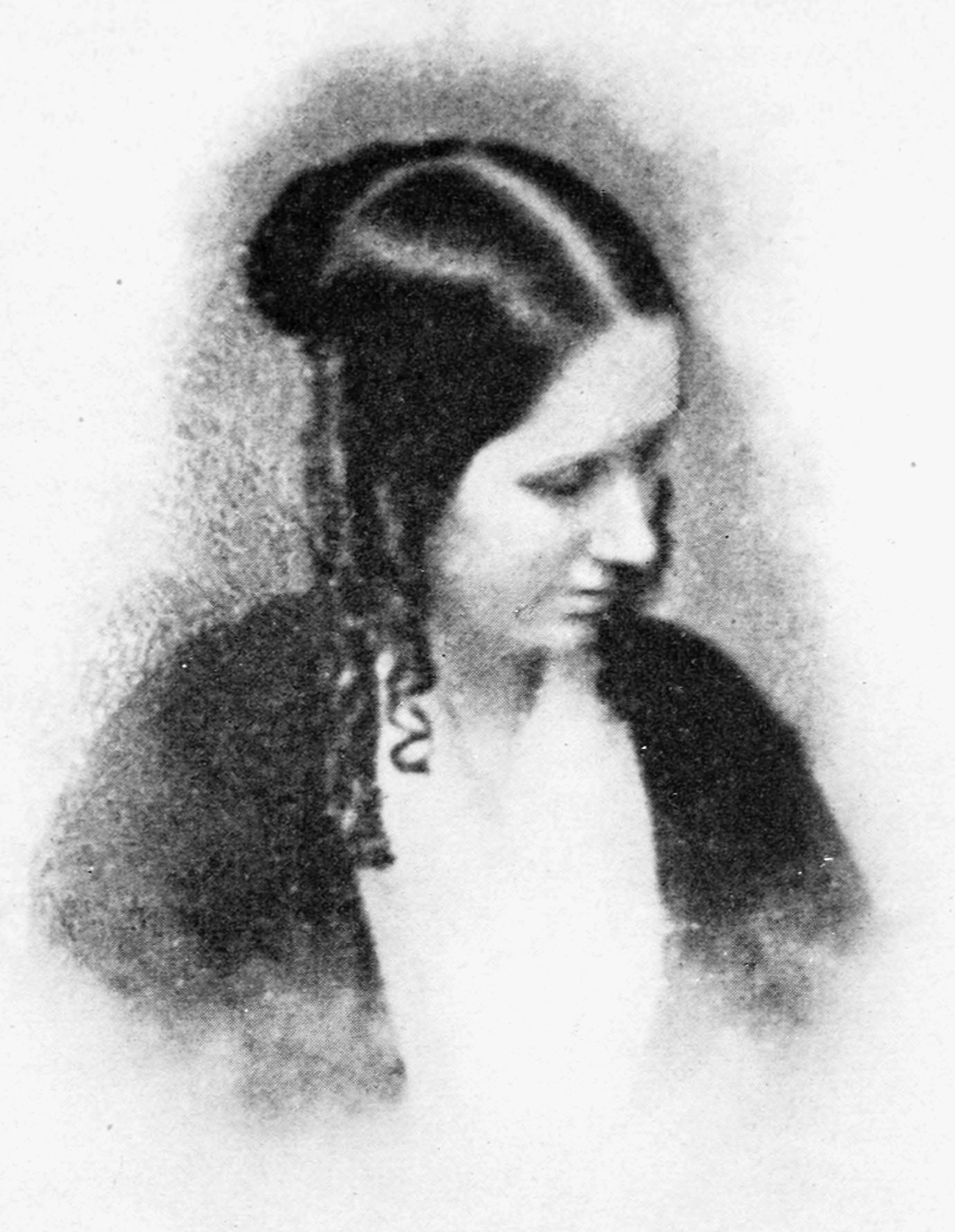
Portrait of Agassiz, 1852

Agassiz traveled with her husband, Louis Agassiz, and their family to Charleston, South Carolina for his professorship in the medical school throughout the winters of 1851–1852 and 1852–1853. She visited Europe with him in 1859. She worked closely with her husband in his scientific research. Specifically, she accompanied him as the main writer and record keeper for the Thayer Expedition to Brazil, from April 1865 to August 1866, and the Hassler Expedition through the Strait of Magellan, from December 1871 to August 1872.

In 1856, in their home in Cambridge, Agassiz founded a school for girls from Boston. Her husband supported her by giving courses as well as arranging for courses from other Harvard professors. After the closure of the school in 1863 she helped organize and manage the Thayer Expedition with her husband, who she accompanied to Brazil (1865–1866). This expedition, occurring from 1865 to 1866, took place at the end of the American Civil War, its maiden voyage from New York to Rio de Janeiro beginning in the war's final week. In 1867, she began a correspondence with Arnold Guyot, a geologist and meteorologist. She also helped organize and manage the next expedition (the Hassler Expedition in 1871–1872), which was the first important marine exploration by the United States government, and made transcripts. After her husband's death in 1873, she published several books on natural history for which she had conducted research for many years.

Agassiz contributed to the founding of the coeducational Anderson School of Natural History. In 1869, she became one of the first women members of the American Philosophical Society (with Mary Fairfax Somerville and Maria Mitchell); she became a member on October 15.

=== Society for the Private Collegiate Instruction for Women ===
In 1879, Agassiz was one of seven female managing directors of the Society for the Private Collegiate Instruction for Women (Harvard Annex). This provided qualified women who intended to pursue an advancement in their education in Cambridge with the opportunity to have private tutoring from professors at Harvard College.

Agassiz was essential in ensuring that the "Harvard Annex" for women's education was transformed in 1894 from Harvard University into Radcliffe College. From 1894 to 1900, this college was under their direction and from 1900 to 1903 she was honorary president. With her tact and her fundraising skills she promoted the college and contributed significantly to its continuity.

Agassiz became a member of the Ladies' Visiting Committee for the Kindergarten for the Blind, under the Perkins Institution for the Blind. She acted as treasurer for the Cambridge branch of the committee until an illness in 1904.

=== Research and published works ===
Agassiz's research can be studied through her published books in addition to her series of diary entries depicting her global ventures. Her publications include A First Lesson in Natural History (1859) and Seaside Studies in Natural History (1865), in which she was assisted by her stepson, Alexander Emanuel Agassiz. Elizabeth Agassiz originally published A First Lesson under the pseudonym Actaea. Additionally, Elizabeth Agassiz co-authored A Journey in Brazil (1868) and edited and published Louis Agassiz: His Life and Correspondence in 1885. A biography of Elizabeth Cabot Agassiz was later written by her sister, Emma F. Cary, and Lucy Allen Paton, published in the spring of 1917 with the assistance of the Council of Radcliffe College.

== Personal life ==
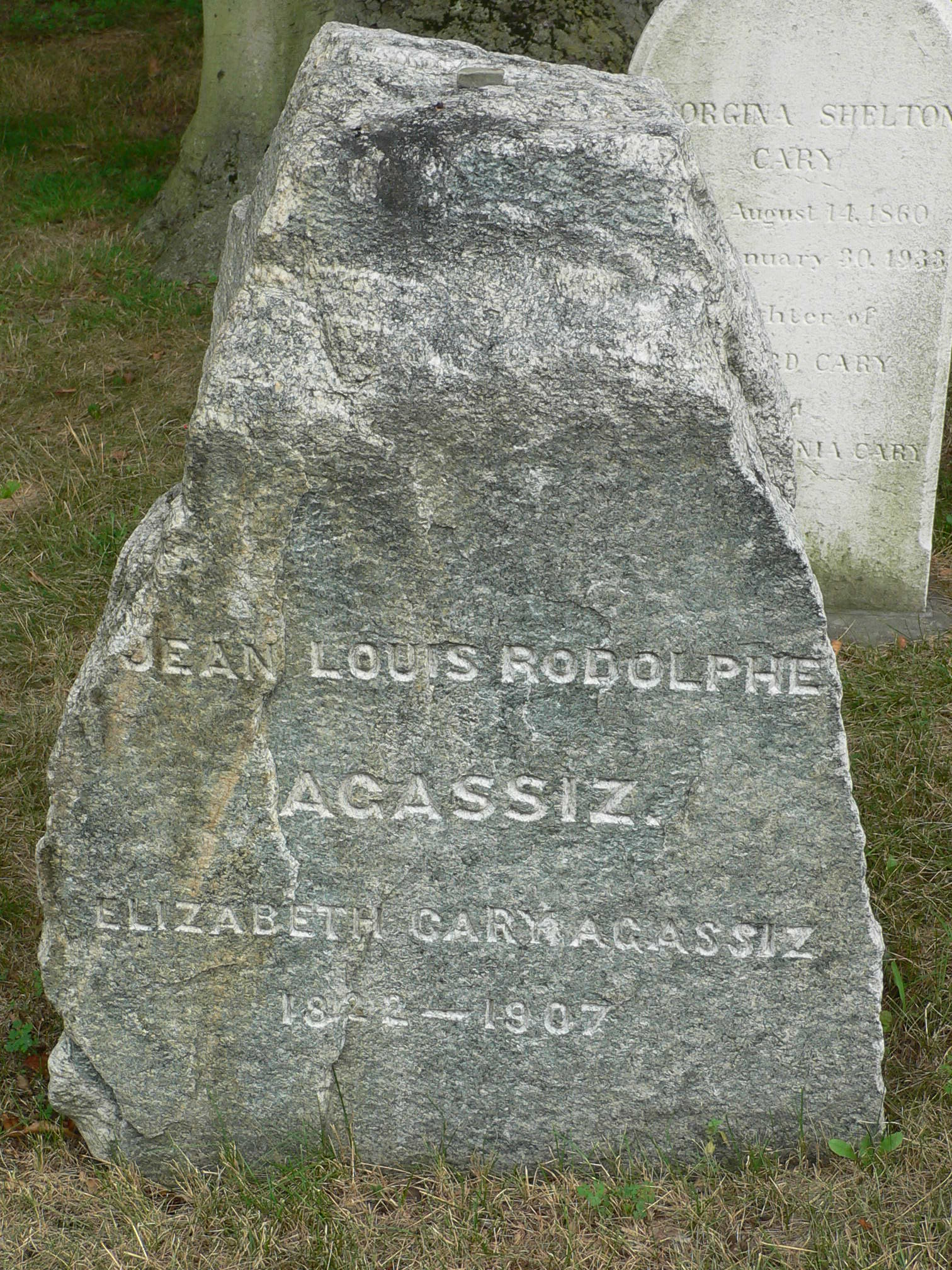
Gravestone of Louis and Elizabeth Agassiz

Following the marriage of her older sister Mary to Harvard Professor Cornelius Conway Felton (later president of Harvard University), Agassiz began socializing with a group of intellectuals in Cambridge, Massachusetts. In 1846, she met scientist Louis Agassiz at a dinner with Mary and her husband. Though they wanted to marry, he was married, with three children (Pauline, Ida and Alexander) in Switzerland. His wife had died in 1848. In December 1849 — when it became more socially acceptable for the couple to wed — Lizzie's father gave his blessing in support of their marriage. They married on April 25, 1850, in Boston, Massachusetts at King's Chapel. Agassiz organized the household and took care of the finances and the children. She developed strong relationships with her stepchildren, Alexander, Ida, and Pauline, and her grandchildren. She had no children of her own.

After her husband's death in 1873, Agassiz continued to devote time to her work and family. She continued to enjoy traveling, and in 1892, Agassiz ventured with family to the Pacific Coast, specifically California, for three months.

Agassiz died on June 27, 1907, in Arlington, Massachusetts of a cerebral hemorrhage. She is buried in Mount Auburn Cemetery with her husband. The monument is a boulder selected from the moraine of the Aar Glaciers, near where Agassiz once lived.

== Selected works ==
- A First Lesson in Natural History (1859)
- Seaside Studies in Natural History (1865)
- A Journey in Brazil (1868)
- Louis Agassiz: His Life and Correspondence, vol. I and vol. II (1885)
