= SS David L. Yulee =

Liberty ship of WWII

History

United States
- Name: David L. Yulee
- Namesake: David L. Yulee
- Owner: War Shipping Administration (WSA)
- Operator: R.A. Nichol & Company
- Ordered: as type (EC2-S-C1) hull, MC hull 2500
- Awarded: 23 April 1943
- Builder: St. Johns River Shipbuilding Company, Jacksonville, Florida
- Cost: $944,862
- Yard number: 64
- Way number: 4
- Laid down: 11 September 1944
- Launched: 16 October 1944
- Sponsored by: Mrs. Emory H. Price
- Completed: 26 October 1944
- Identification: Call sign: KTFF
- Fate: Laid up in the National Defense Reserve Fleet, Beaumont, Texas, 24 September 1948; Laid up in the Hudson River Reserve Fleet, Jones Point, New York, 24 April 1952; Sold for scrapping, 23 November 1970, withdrawn from fleet, 29 March 1971

General characteristics
- Class & type: Liberty ship; type EC2-S-C1, standard
- Tonnage: 10,865 LT DWT; 7,176 GRT
- Displacement: 3,380 long tons (3,434 t) (light); 14,245 long tons (14,474 t) (max)
- Length: 441 feet 6 inches (135 m) oa; 416 feet (127 m) pp; 427 feet (130 m) lwl
- Beam: 57 feet (17 m)
- Draft: 27 ft 9.25 in (8.4646 m)
- Installed power: 2 × Oil fired 450 °F (232 °C) boilers, operating at 220 psi (1,500 kPa); 2,500 hp (1,900 kW)
- Propulsion: 1 × triple-expansion steam engine, (manufactured by General Machinery Corp., Hamilton, Ohio); 1 × screw propeller
- Speed: 11.5 knots (21.3 km/h; 13.2 mph)
- Capacity: 562,608 cubic feet (15,931 m^{3}) (grain); 499,573 cubic feet (14,146 m^{3}) (bale)
- Complement: 38–62 USMM; 21–40 USNAG
- Armament: Varied by ship; Bow-mounted 3-inch (76 mm)/50-caliber gun; Stern-mounted 4-inch (102 mm)/50-caliber gun; 2–8 × single 20-millimeter (0.79 in) Oerlikon anti-aircraft (AA) cannons and/or, 2–8 × 37-millimeter (1.46 in) M1 AA guns

SS David L. Yulee was a Liberty ship built in the United States during World War II. She was named after David Levy Yulee, an American politician and attorney. Born in St. Thomas, then under British control. He later served as Florida's territorial delegate to Congress. Yulee was the first person of Jewish ancestry to be elected and serve as a United States senator. He founded the Florida Railroad Company and served as president of several other companies, earning the nickname of "Father of Florida Railroads".

== Construction ==
David L. Yulee was laid down on 11 September 1944, under a Maritime Commission (MARCOM) contract, MC hull 2500, by the St. Johns River Shipbuilding Company, Jacksonville, Florida; she was sponsored by Mrs. Emory H. Price, the wife of congressman Emory H. Price, and was launched on 10 October 1944.

== History ==
She was allocated to the R.A. Nichol & Company, on 26 October 1944. On 24 September 1948, she was laid up in the National Defense Reserve Fleet, Beaumont, Texas. On 24 April 1952, she was laid up in the Hudson River Reserve Fleet, Jones Point, New York. On 28 April 1953, she was withdrawn from the fleet to be loaded with grain under the "Grain Program 1953", she returned loaded on 7 May 1953. On 14 October 1957, she was withdrawn to be unload, she returned on empty 17 October 1957. On 2 December 1958, she was withdrawn from the fleet to be loaded with grain under the "Grain Program 1958", she returned loaded on 12 December 1958. On 24 July 1959, she was withdrawn to be unload, she returned on empty 30 July 1959. She was sold for scrapping, 23 November 1970, to Hierros Ardes, S.A. She was removed from the fleet on March 29, 1971.

== Bibliography ==
- "St. John's River Shipbuilding, Jacksonville FL". www.ShipbuildingHistory.com. 16 October 2010.
- Maritime Administration. "David L. Yulee". Ship History Database Vessel Status Card. U.S. Department of Transportation, Maritime Administration.
- Davies, James (May 2004). "Specifications (As-Built)" (PDF). p. 23.
- "SS David L. Yulee".
