= Yulee Sugar Mill Ruins Historic State Park =

Florida State Park located in Homosassa, Florida, U.S.

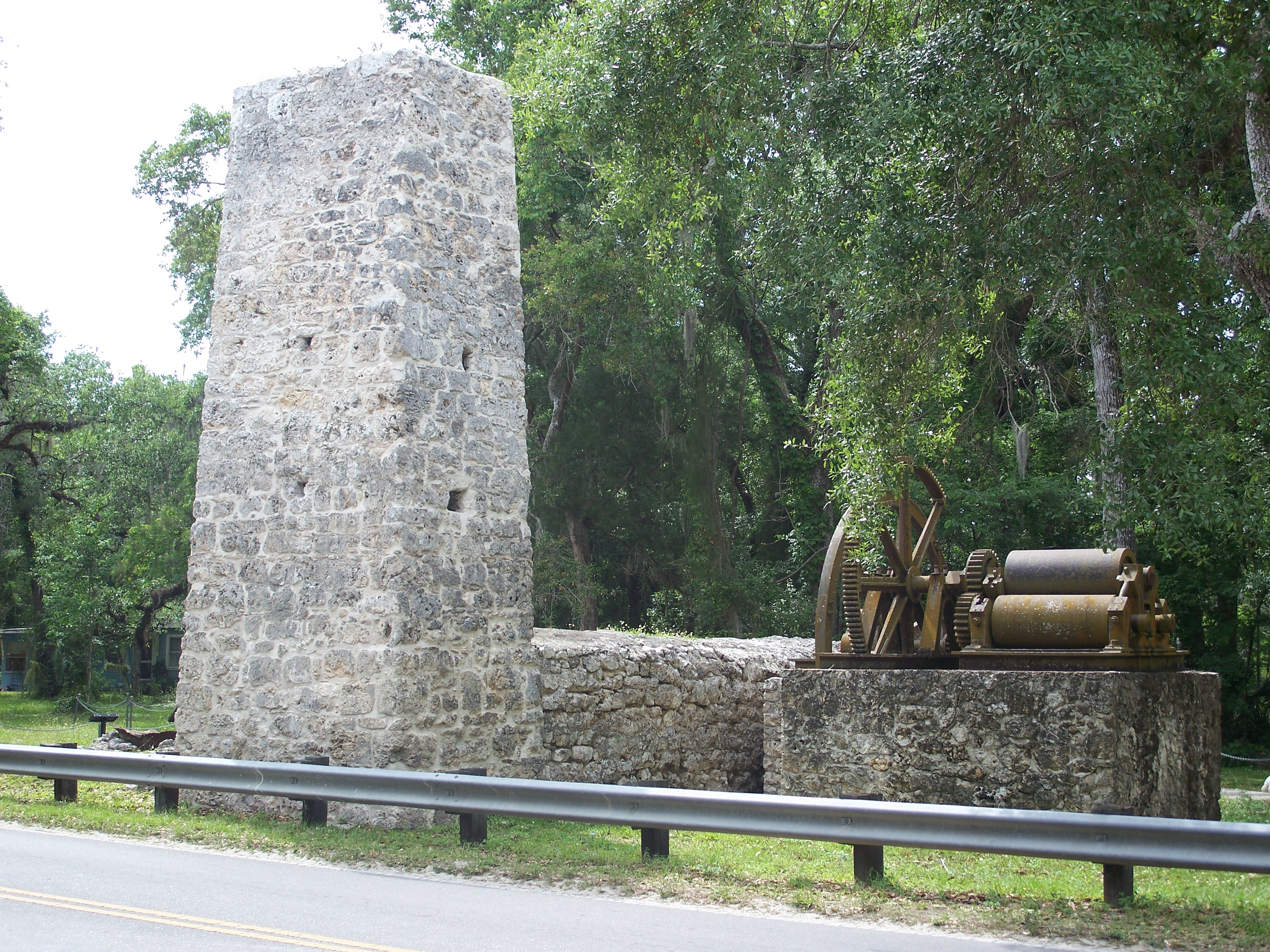
- Ruins of a sugar mill at the park

- Location within Florida Location within the United States
- Interactive map of Yulee Sugar Mill Ruins Historic State Park
- Location: Citrus County, Florida, United States
- Nearest city: Homosassa, Florida
- Coordinates: 28°47.0′N 82°36.4′W
- Established: August 12, 1970
- Governing body: Florida Department of Environmental Protection
- Yulee Sugar Mill Ruins Historic State Park
- U.S. National Register of Historic Places
- NRHP reference No.: 70000179

Yulee Sugar Mill Ruins Historic State Park is a Florida State Park located in Homosassa, off U.S. 19. It contains the ruins of a forced-labor farm owned by David Levy Yulee. Yulee was an enslaver and a delegate of the Florida Territorial Legislative Council. After Florida became a state, he was elected by the legislature in 1845 to the United States Senate, becoming the first American of Jewish heritage to serve there. After Florida seceded from the Union, Yulee served in the Confederate Congress. He is credited with having developed a network of railroads that tremendously boosted the state's economy.

At Homosassa, Yulee established a farm of some 5,000 acres (2,000 ha) worked by about 1,000 enslaved African Americans. They raised sugarcane, citrus, and cotton. The large mill (which was steam-driven) ran from 1851 to 1864. It produced sugar, syrup and molasses, the latter used in making rum. The farm supplied confederate soldiers with sugar products during the American Civil War. In May 1864, Union forces burned Yulee's plantation and home, but were unable to find the mill; however, the mill was abandoned as a result of the Union raid and it fell into ruin over time.

At the park, the stonework (foundation, well and 40-foot chimney) of the mill, iron gears, a cane press, and some of the other machinery remain. The site was added to the National Register of Historic Places on August 12, 1970.

In 1997, the Gulf Archaeology Research Institute surveyed the mill site to assess its condition. The Florida Park Service subsequently worked with the National Park Service to stabilize the masonry, using laser scanning to guide repairs.
