= USS Kenmore (AK-221) =

Cargo ship of the United States Navy

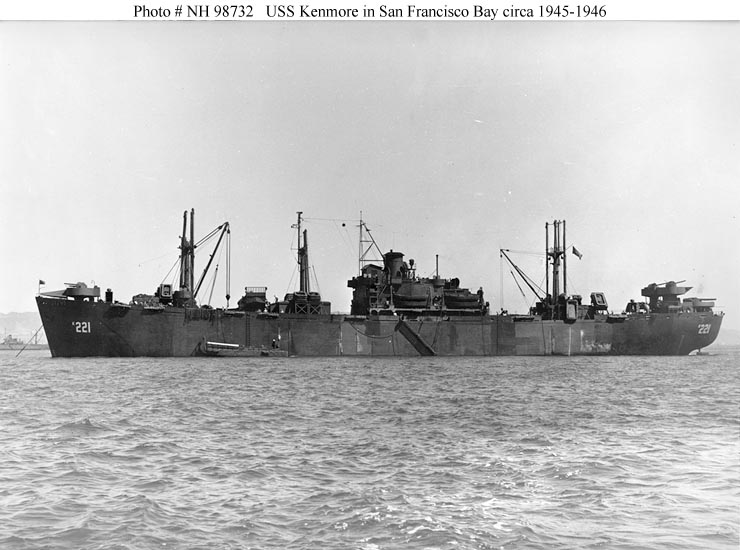
- USS Kenmore (AK-221), in San Francisco Bay, California, in late 1945 or early 1946.

History

United States
- Name: James H. McClintock; Kenmore
- Namesake: James H. McClintock; The house Kenmore in Virginia
- Owner: War Shipping Administration (WSA)
- Operator: R.A. Nicol & Company; American President Lines (APL)
- Ordered: as a Type EC2-S-C1 hull, MCE hull 1664
- Builder: California Shipbuilding Corporation, Terminal Island, Los Angeles, California
- Yard number: 197
- Way number: 3
- Laid down: 8 May 1943
- Launched: 30 May 1943
- Sponsored by: Mrs. T. J. Bluechel
- In service: 12 June 1943
- Renamed: Kenmore, 27 October 1943
- Reclassified: Naval Transport, 27 October 1943
- Identification: Hull symbol: AP-162
- Fate: transferred to the US Navy, 14 November 1943

United States
- Name: Kenmore
- Acquired: 14 November 1943
- Commissioned: 14 November 1943
- Decommissioned: 1 February 1946
- Reclassified: Cargo Ship, 20 August 1944
- Stricken: 25 February 1946
- Identification: Hull symbol: AP-162; Hull symbol: AK-221; Code letters: NKWA
- Honors and awards: 2 × battle star
- Fate: Sold for scrapping, 13 February 1973, removed, 26 March 1973

General characteristics
- Class & type: Crater-class cargo ship
- Type: Type EC2-S-C1
- Displacement: 4,023 long tons (4,088 t) (light); 12,350 long tons (12,550 t) (full load)
- Length: 441 ft 6 in (134.57 m)
- Beam: 24 ft 6 in (7.47 m)
- Draft: 28 ft 4 in (8.64 m)
- Installed power: 2 × Babcock & Wilcox header-type boilers, 220psi 450°; 2,500 shp (1,900 kW)
- Propulsion: 1 × Joshua Hendy vertical triple-expansion reciprocating steam engine; 1 × shaft
- Speed: 12.8 kn (23.7 km/h; 14.7 mph)
- Capacity: 4,470 t (4,400 long tons) DWT; 300,000 cu ft (8,500 m^{3}) (non-refrigerated)
- Armament: 1 × 5 in (127 mm)/38 caliber dual purpose (DP) gun; 4 × 3 in (76 mm)/50 caliber DP gun; 8 × 20 mm (0.79 in) Oerlikon cannons anti-aircraft (AA) gun mounts

USS Kenmore (AP-162/AK-221) was a Crater-class cargo ship built during World War II for the US Navy. Kenmore was named after George Washington's sister Elizabeth's house Kenmore. Kenmore was responsible for delivering troops, goods and equipment to locations in the Asiatic-Pacific Theater.

== Construction ==
Kenmore was laid down 8 May 1943, under a Maritime Commission (MARCOM) contract, MC hull No. 1664, as the Liberty ship SS James H. McClintock, by California Shipbuilding Corporation, Terminal Island, Los Angeles, California; launched on 30 May 1943; sponsored by Mrs. T. J. Bluechel; renamed Kenmore 27 October 1943; acquired by the Navy and commissioned 14 November 1943.

== Service history ==
=== 1943–1944 ===
Kenmore loaded cargo and departed Oakland, California, 22 November 1943, arriving Pearl Harbor on 1 December. After repairs at Pearl Harbor, she prepared for the Marshall Islands invasion and departed Hawaii 25 January 1944. Nine days later she arrived off the shores of Majuro Atoll with troops and equipment of the attacking force. The cargo ship returned to Pearl Harbor 21 February, to embark garrison troops for the Gilbert Islands, debarking them at Tarawa in March.

After shuttling troops between the Gilberts and Hawaii for the next two months, Kenmore departed Honolulu 29 May, for Kwajalein, the staging area for the invasion of the Marianas. There she loaded troops of the 106th Infantry and arrived with the massive amphibious force in the assault area off Saipan 20 June. After a beachhead was secured, Kenmore remained in the area until 8 July, unloading cargo and equipment. Throughout the summer she transported troops among the Marshalls, Marianas, and Hawaii.

Reclassified AK-221 on 20 August, Kenmore stood out of Honolulu 25 September, with cargo and reinforcements for the Palau Islands via Eniwetok, arriving Kossal Roads 29 October. She continued supplying the Pacific Islands with men and equipment for the next six months.

=== 1945–1946 ===
The cargo ship departed Ulithi 20 April 1945 with reinforcements needed for the Okinawa campaign, arriving there six days later.

In the closing days of the war, Kenmore shuttled troops between California and the Pacific Islands, insuring the already inevitable victory. When hostilities ended 15 August, Kenmore was assigned to Operation "Magic Carpet" duty. She made two cruises between the Islands, China, and San Francisco arriving with her final group 15 December.

== Post-war decommissioning ==
Kenmore remained in San Francisco, and decommissioned there 1 February 1946. She was delivered to the War Shipping Administration the same day for return to her owner. Her name reverted to James H. McClintock.

== Fate ==
She was placed in the National Defense Reserve Fleet, Suisun Bay Group, until purchased by Chi Shun Hua Steel Company, Ltd., on 13 February 1973, for $185,150. She was physically removed from the Reserve Fleet on 26 March 1973.

== Awards ==
Kenmore received two battle stars for World War II service.

== Notes ==
Citations

== Bibliography ==
Online resources

- "Kenmore". Dictionary of American Naval Fighting Ships. Naval History and Heritage Command. 28 July 2015. This article incorporates text from this source, which is in the public domain.
- "California Shipbuilding, Los Angeles CA". www.ShipbuildingHistory.com. 13 October 2010.
- "USS Kenmore (AK-221)". NavSource. 6 September 2013.
- "JAMES H. McCLINTOCK". United States Department of Transportation. Archived from the original on December 12, 2019.
