= USAT Cuba =

Passenger ship

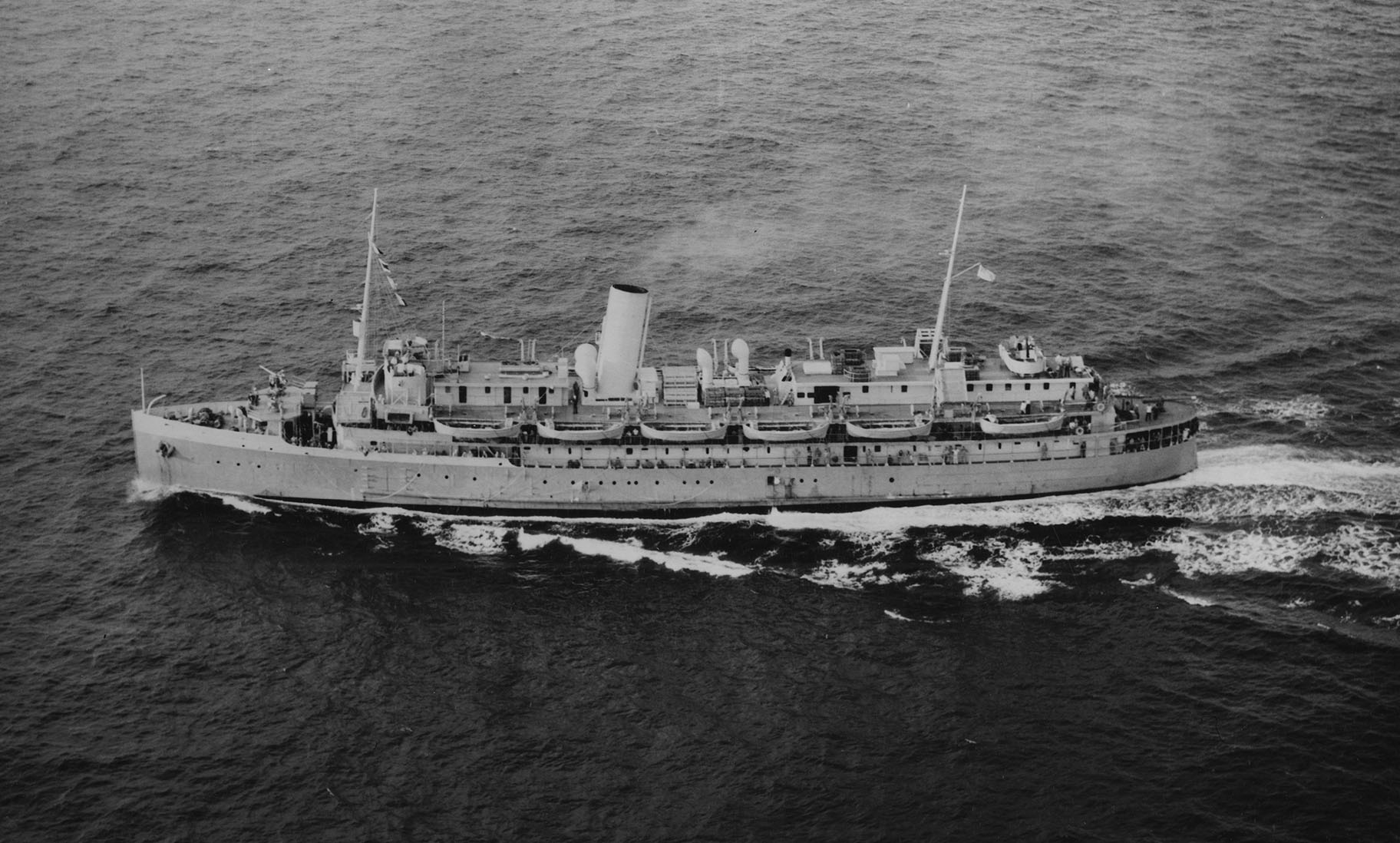
- USAT Cuba

History

United States
- Name: Cuba
- Namesake: Cuba
- Owner: Peninsular & Occidental Steamship Company
- Route: Commercial: Tampa, Key West, Havana
- Builder: William Cramp & Sons Shipbuilding Company
- Launched: 11 December 1920
- Completed: 1921
- Home port: New Haven, Connecticut (Commercial)
- Identification: Official Number: 221220; Signal letters: MCRW 1921; KDBT 1941
- Fate: Scrapped in 1962

General characteristics
- Tonnage: 2,479 GRT
- Length: 325 ft (99.1 m) over all; 325 ft (99.1 m) registry
- Beam: 47 ft 2 in (14.4 m)
- Draft: 17 ft (5.2 m)
- Depth: 18 ft (5.5 m)
- Speed: 18 kn (21 mph; 33 km/h) Original, commercial; 15 kn (17 mph; 28 km/h) Army
- Range: 3,500 nmi (4,000 mi; 6,500 km)
- Capacity: 520 passengers (commercial); 596 passengers (Army transport)
- Crew: 54
- Armament: 1 x 5"/51 caliber gun mount; 2 × 3"/50 caliber gun mounts; 2 × 20 mm Oerlikon AA gun mounts

USAT Cuba was the passenger ship Cuba of the Peninsular & Occidental Steamship Company (Note: A few references give the name as "Plant Line". Peninsular & Occidental Steamship Company was formed in a merger of Plant Line with Florida East Coast Line.) built by William Cramp & Sons Shipbuilding Company, Philadelphia in 1920 and placed into operation in 1921 for scheduled passenger and freight service between Tampa, Key West and Havana.

The ship maintained regular service over twenty years until delivered to the United States War Shipping Administration (WSA) on 19 February 1942. It was operated by the line under a standard WSA agreement until placed under bareboat charter to the Army for operation as USAT Cuba until returned to WSA and again briefly operated by Peninsular & Occidental for WSA 31 July 1946 through 20 December 1946 when returned to the company. The ship was sold to an Italian company in June 1947 to be renamed Pace and then Sassari until scrapped in 1962.

== Commercial service ==
Cuba, official number 221220 with signal MCRW that was KDBT by 1941, was 2,479 GRT, 341 ft 2 in (104.0 m) length overall, 325 ft (99.1 m) registry length ship with 47 ft 2 in (14.4 m) breadth. The two engines were oil fueled reciprocating with total 3,600 indicated horsepower driving two screws. Registry crew was 54 and home port was New Haven, Connecticut.

Peninsular & Occidental information showed the ship's speed as 18 kn (21 mph; 33 km/h) with Army information twenty years later indicating speed was reduced to 18 kn (21 mph; 33 km/h). Cuba had 132 passenger cabins with an additional 16 "parlor" cabins with double beds and a sofa berth. The passenger capacity was 520.

A seawater thermograph was provided by the U. S. Weather Bureau and after testing in Washington and shipping to the Weather Bureau in Key West installed by the ship's chief engineer. The first week of data collection was 12–19 July 1931 began routine collection on the ship's twice weekly Tampa—Key West—Havana runs with records filed with the Bureau in Washington. Cuba provided measurements at a slightly deeper draft than another vessel transiting on the same days.

== World War II service ==
During World War II the ship was delivered to the War Shipping Administration (WSA) in New Orleans on 19 February 1942. Cuba was operated by Peninsular & Occidental under WSA agreement until delivered to the United States Army on 25 April 1943. The ship underwent conversion, increasing passenger capacity to 596 and added ventilation, for use as a troopship.

The transport spent the majority of the war operating out of New Orleans transporting troops to British Guiana, Cuba, Panama, Puerto Rico, Trinidad, and the West Indies. In September 1942 the ship underwent repairs in Panama and in September more extensive repairs in New York. After repairs there Cuba made one trip to Bermuda by way of Norfolk before returning to the regular area of operations.

Cuba with women military personnel destined for San Juan, Puerto Rico, was in convoy, escorted by U.S. and Canadian small vessels met in the Strait of Florida for escort to Guantanamo, along with the tanker SS Virginia Sinclair, the Liberty ship SS James Sprunt that was carrying approximately 10,000 tons of ammunition, USAT H. A. Scandreet transporting troops to the Panama Canal, and SS Furnifold M. Simmons loaded with explosives destined for Karachi. At the eastern end of Cuba the convoy was attacked with Virginia Sinclair sunk and James Sprunt exploding. Other ships were damaged by debris from the explosion.

For some time late in the war the ship was assigned to the Panama Canal for operations, leaving that assignment 1 January 1946 to resume operations out of New Orleans.

Cuba was also involved in transporting citizens of Axis nations resident in Latin American countries to the United States for internment. One such trip in 1944 saw the transport of 540 German and Japanese internees.

== Post war & sale ==
After the war Cuba was operated briefly by Peninsular & Occidental Steamship Company under WSA agreement from 31 July 1946 through 20 December 1946 when the ship was returned to the company. In June 1947 Cuba was sold to an Italian company and renamed Pace then sold 1960 renamed Sassari until scrapped in 1962.
