= R. A. Nicol & Company =

Former US Shipping Company

- Industry: Transportation and shipping
- Founded: 1923 in New York City
- Key people: D. K. Ludwig

R. A. Nicol & Company was a shipping and ship broker company founded in New York City by Robert Alexander Nicol in 1923. Robert Alexander Nicol was born in England in 1880. Robert Alexander Nicol came to the United States in 1906 at the age of 26, from Liverpool, England. In 1290 Robert Alexander Nicol became a naturalized United States citizen. He started in the shipping business by working for the Oriental Navigation Company in New York City in 1916. R. A. Nicol & Company's office was at 17 Battery Place, New York City. R. A. Nicol & Company supported the World War II effort by operating United States owned ships.

== World War II ==
R. A. Nicol & Company ships were used to help the World War II effort. During World War II T. R. A. Nicol & Company operated Merchant navy ships for the United States Shipping Board. During World War II R. A. Nicol & Company was active with charter shipping with the Maritime Commission and War Shipping Administration. R. A. Nicol & Company operated Liberty ships and Victory ships for the merchant navy. The ship was run by itsR. A. Nicol & Company crew and the US Navy supplied United States Navy Armed Guards to man the deck guns and radio.

== Ships ==
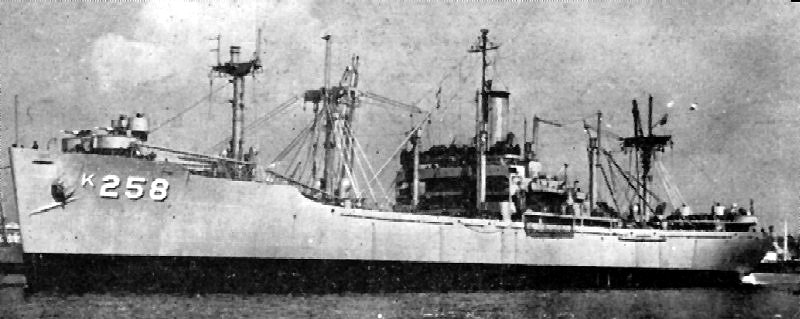
A Victory ship of World War II

Liberty ship of World War II

  - World War II operated ships:
  - Liberty Ships:
- James H. McClintock, later became USS Kenmore (AK-221)
- SS Furnifold M. Simmons, built in 1943.
- SS David L. Yulee
- M. H. De Young, built in 1943, on August 14, 1943, was torpedoed and damaged by Japanese submarine I-19 in South Pacific Ocean, south of Fiji. In 1944 US Navy used as her as the USS Antelope (IX-109) a storage barge, sold in 1946 and renamed M. H. DE YOUNG, in 1948 sold to China for scrap. In 1950 scrapped Shanghai.
- Telfair Stockton
- George L. Curry
- Joseph M. Terrell
- Frank P. Walsh
- Albert A. Michelson
- Ezra Cornell, built in 1943 used as troopship, sold in 1947 to French Gov't and renamed ISingy, sold in 1950 to Cie Chargeurs Reunis of Paris, sold in 1965 to Greek firm renamed Odysion, on December 23, 1967, sank after leaking being abandoned.
- Horace Bushnell Built in 1943, on March 20, 1945, was torpedoed by German submarine U-995 off North Russia. Ship was abandoned and beached to stop sinking. Later salvaged and taken over by Soviet Union, became Pamyati Kirova.
- William Hodson (3)
- Ezra Cornell
  - Victory ships:
- Westminster Victory troopship used for Operation Magic Carpet operated from 1945 to 1947.

== See also ==
- World War II United States Merchant Navy
