= List of ship launches in 1945 =

The list of ship launches in 1945 includes a chronological list of some of the ships launched in 1945.

Date	Ship	Class / type	Builder	Location	Country	Notes
3 January	James Roy Wells	Liberty ship	Todd Houston Shipbuilding Corporation	Houston, Texas	United States	For War Shipping Administration.
3 January	TID 132	TID-class tug	Richard Dunston Ltd.	Thorne	United Kingdom	For the Admiralty.
3 January	U-2361	Type XXIII submarine	Deutsche Werft AG	Hamburg	Germany	For Kriegsmarine
3 January	U-4703	Type XXIII submarine	Germaniawerft	Kiel	Germany	For Kriegsmarine
4 January	Brigham Victory	Victory ship	Permanmente Metals Corporation	Richmond, California	United States	For War Shipping Administration.
4 January	Michael James Monohan	Liberty ship	J. A. Jones Construction Company	Panama City, Florida	United States	For War Shipping Administration.
5 January	Albion Victory	Victory ship	Bethlehem Fairfield Shipyard	Baltimore, Maryland	United States	For War Shipping Administration.
5 January	LST-1081	LST-542-class tank landing ship	American Bridge Company	Ambridge, Pennsylvania	United States	
5 January	St. Cloud Victory	Victory ship	Oregon Shipbuilding Corporation	Portland, Oregon	United States	For War Shipping Administration.
6 January	Harold A. Jordan	Liberty ship	St. Johns River Shipbuilding Company	Jacksonville, Florida	United States	For War Shipping Administration.
6 January	U-2538	Type XXI submarine	Blohm + Voss	Hamburg	Germany	For Kriegsmarine
6 January	U-2539	Type XXI submarine	Blohm + Voss	Hamburg	Germany	For Kriegsmarine
6 January	U-3031	Type XXI submarine	AG Weser	Bremen	Germany	For Kriegsmarine
6 January	William K. Kamaka	Liberty ship	Todd Houston Shipbuilding Corporation	Houston, Texas	United States	For War Shipping Administration.
6 January	William Terry Howell	Liberty ship	Southeastern Shipbuilding Corporation	Savannah, Georgia	United States	For War Shipping Administration.
7 January	Sunset Hills	T2 tanker	Marinship Corporation	Sausalito, California	United States	For United States Maritime Commission.
7 January	U-3038	Type XXI submarine	AG Weser	Bremen	Germany	For Kriegsmarine
8 January	George R. Poole	Liberty ship	J. A. Jones Construction Co.	Brunswick, Georgia	United States	For War Shipping Administration.
8 January	Mobile Bay	T2 Tanker	Alabama Drydock and Shipbuilding Company	Mobile, Alabama	United States	For War Shipping Administration.
9 January	Charles A. Draper	Liberty ship	J. A. Jones Construction Company	Panama City, Florida	United States	For War Shipping Administration.
9 January	Douglas Victory	Victory ship	California Shipbuilding Corporation	Los Angeles, California	United States	For War Shipping Administration.
9 January	Green Bay Victory	Victory ship	Oregon Shipbuilding Corporation	Portland, Oregon	United States	For War Shipping Administration.
9 January	Halaula Victory	Victory ship	Permanente Metals Corporation	Richmond, California	United States	For War Shipping Administration.
9 January	Hobbs Victory	Victory ship	Permanente Metals Corporation	Richmond, California	United States	For War Shipping Administration.
9 January	Kent Island	Liberty ship	New England Shipbuilding Corporation	South Portland, Maine	United States	For War Shipping Administration.
10 January	Daniel L. Johnston	Liberty ship	Todd Houston Shipbuilding Corporation	Houston, Texas	United States	For War Shipping Administration.
10 January	San Marcos	Casa Grande-class dock landing ship	Philadelphia Navy Yard	Philadelphia	United States	
10 January	U-3032	Type XXI submarine	AG Weser	Bremen	Germany	For Kriegsmarine
10 January	U-3527	Type XXI submarine	Schichau-Werke	Danzig	Germany	For Kriegsmarine
10 January	U-3528	Type XXI submarine	Schichau-Werke	Danzig	Germany	For Kriegsmarine
11 January	Frank E. Spencer	Liberty ship	Delta Shipbuilding	New Orleans, Louisiana	United States	For War Shipping Administration.
11 January	Sedalia Victory	Victory ship	Bethlehem Fairfield Shipyard	Baltimore, Maryland	United States	For War Shipping Administration.
11 January	Texarcana Victory	Victory ship	California Shipbuilding Corporation	Los Angeles, California	United States	For War Shipping Administration.
11 January	U-2362	Type XXIII submarine	Deutsche Werft AG	Hamburg	Germany	For Kriegsmarine
11 January	U-4705	Type XXIII submarine	Germaniawerft	Kiel	Germany	For Kriegsmarine
12 January	Empire Life	Standard Fast type Cargo liner	Caledon Shipbuilding & Engineering Co. Ltd.	Dundee	United Kingdom	For Ministry of War Transport.
12 January	Harold O. Wilson	Liberty ship	J. A. Jones Construction Co.	Brunswick, Georgia	United States	For War Shipping Administration.
12 January	Pinewood	C-type coaster	S. P. Austin & Sons Ltd.	Sunderland	United Kingdom	For Wm. France, Fenwick & Co. Ltd.
12 January	Rock Springs Victory	Victory ship	Oregon Shipbuilding Corporation	Portland, Oregon	United States	For War Shipping Administration.
13 January	Bartlesville Victory	Victory ship	California Shipbuilding Corporation	Los Angeles, California	United States	For War Shipping Administration.
13 January	El Reno Victory	Victory ship	Permanente Metals Corporation	Richmond, California	United States	For War Shipping Administration.
13 January	Lloyd S. Carlson	Liberty ship	Todd Houston Shipbuilding Corporation	Houston, Texas	United States	For War Shipping Administration.
13 January	TID 133	TID-class tug	Richard Dunston Ltd.	Thorne	United Kingdom	For the Admiralty.
13 January	U-2540	Type XXI submarine	Blohm + Voss	Hamburg	Germany	For Kriegsmarine
13 January	U-2541	Type XXI submarine	Blohm + Voss	Hamburg	Germany	For Kriegsmarine
13 January	William Leroy Gable	Liberty ship	Southeastern Shipbuilding Corporation	Savannah, Georgia	United States	For War Shipping Administration.
13 January	William W. Mckee	Liberty ship	Delta Shipbuilding	New Orleans, Louisiana	United States	For War Shipping Administration.
14 January	Cedar Rapids Victory	Victory ship	California Shipbuilding Corporation	Los Angeles, California	United States	For War Shipping Administration.
14 January	Midway Hills	T2 tanker	Marinship Corporation	Sausalito, California	United States	For United States Maritime Commission.
15 January	Betzdorf	Hansa A Type cargo ship	Deutsche Werft	Hamburg	Germany	For Unternehmen der Eisenstahlindustrie
15 January	Ezra Meech	Liberty ship	New England Shipbuilding Corporation	South Portland, Maine	United States	For War Shipping Administration.
15 January	F. Scott Fitzgerald	Liberty ship	New England Shipbuilding Corporation	South Portland, Maine	United States	For War Shipping Administration.
15 January	John Miller	Liberty ship	St. Johns River Shipbuilding Company	Jacksonville, Florida	United States	For War Shipping Administration.
15 January	Zanesville Victory	Victory ship	Bethlehem Fairfield Shipyard	Baltimore, Maryland	United States	For War Shipping Administration.
16 January	Empire Fairway	Empire F type coaster	Goole Shipbuilding & Repairing Co. Ltd	Goole	United Kingdom	For Ministry of War Transport.
16 January	La Grande Victory	Victory ship	Oregon Shipbuilding Corporation	Portland, Oregon	United States	For War Shipping Administration.
16 January	Logan Victory	Victory ship	Permanente Metals Corporation	Richmond, California	United States	For War Shipping Administration.
16 January	Rafael R. Rivera	Liberty ship	J. A. Jones Construction Company	Panama City, Florida	United States	For War Shipping Administration.
16 January	St Brides Bay	Bay-class frigate	Harland & Wolff	Belfast	United Kingdom	For Royal Navy.
17 January	Alfred E. Smith	Liberty ship	New England Shipbuilding Corporation	South Portland, Maine	United States	For War Shipping Administration.
17 January	VIC 91	VIC lighter	Richard Dunston Ltd.	Thorne	United Kingdom	For the Admiralty.
18 January	Frontenac Victory	Victory ship	Bethlehem Fairfield Shipyard	Baltimore, Maryland	United States	For War Shipping Administration.
18 January	Labaina Victory	Victory ship	Permanente Metals Corporation	Richmond, California	United States	For War Shipping Administration.
18 January	Russell R. Jones	Liberty ship	Todd Houston Shipbuilding Corporation	Houston, Texas	United States	For War Shipping Administration.
18 January	U-2363	Type XXIII submarine	Deutsche Werft AG	Hamburg	Germany	For Kriegsmarine
19 January	Appleton Victory	Victory ship	Oregon Shipbuilding Corporation	Portland, Oregon	United States	For War Shipping Administration.
19 January	Chanute Victory	Victory ship	California Shipbuilding Corporation	Los Angeles, California	United States	For War Shipping Administration.
19 January	Empire Shetland	Coastal tanker	A & J Inglis Ltd	Glasgow	United Kingdom	For Ministry of War Transport.
19 January	James Bennett Moore	Liberty ship	J. A. Jones Construction Co.	Brunswick, Georgia	United States	For War Shipping Administration.
19 January	John Martin Miller	Liberty ship	Todd Houston Shipbuilding Corporation	Houston, Texas	United States	For War Shipping Administration.
19 January	Pit River	T2 Tanker	Alabama Drydock and Shipbuilding Company	Mobile, Alabama	United States	For War Shipping Administration.
19 January	TID 134	TID-class tug	Richard Dunston Ltd.	Thorne	United Kingdom	For Ministry of War Transport.
19 January	U-4076	Type XXIII submarine	Germaniawerft	Kiel	Germany	For Kriegsmarine
19 January	VIC 92	VIC lighter	Richard Dunston Ltd.	Thorne	United Kingdom	For the Admiralty.
20 January	Clearwater Victory	Victory ship	Permanente Metals Corporation	Richmond, California	United States	For War Shipping Administration.
20 January	Frostburg Victory	Victory ship	Bethlehem Fairfield Shipyard	Baltimore, Maryland	United States	For War Shipping Administration.
20 January	Gretna Victory	Victory ship	Permanente Metals Corporation	Richmond, California	United States	For War Shipping Administration.
20 January	Harry Kirby	Liberty ship	Southeastern Shipbuilding Corporation	Savannah, Georgia	United States	For War Shipping Administration.
20 January	U-3033	Type XXI submarine	AG Weser	Bremen	Germany	For Kriegsmarine
20 January	Whittier Hills	T2 tanker	Marinship Corporation	Sausalito, California	United States	For United States Maritime Commission.
21 January	James H. Courts	Liberty ship	St. Johns River Shipbuilding Company	Jacksonville, Florida	United States	For War Shipping Administration.
21 January	U-3034	Type XXI submarine	AG Weser	Bremen	Germany	For Kriegsmarine
22 January	Fort Robinson	T2 Tanker	Alabama Drydock and Shipbuilding Company	Mobile, Alabama	United States	For War Shipping Administration.
22 January	U-2542	Type XXI submarine	Blohm + Voss	Hamburg	Germany	For Kriegsmarine
23 January	Ames Victory	Victory ship	Oregon Shipbuilding Corporation	Portland, Oregon	United States	For War Shipping Administration.
23 January	James W. Wheeler	Liberty ship	J. A. Jones Construction Company	Panama City, Florida	United States	For War Shipping Administration.
23 January	John C. Preston	Liberty ship	Delta Shipbuilding	New Orleans, Louisiana	United States	For War Shipping Administration.
23 January	T. S. Gold	Liberty ship	New England Shipbuilding Corporation	South Portland, Maine	United States	For War Shipping Administration.
23 January	U-2364	Type XXIII submarine	Deutsche Werft AG	Hamburg	Germany	For Kriegsmarine
24 January	Laredo Victory	Victory ship	Permanente Metals Corporation	Richmond, California	United States	For War Shipping Administration.
24 January	La Salle Seam	Liberty ship	Delta Shipbuilding	New Orleans, Louisiana	United States	For War Shipping Administration.
24 January	Monroe Victory	Victory ship	California Shipbuilding Corporation	Los Angeles, California	United States	For War Shipping Administration.
24 January	U-3035	Type XXI submarine	AG Weser	Bremen	Germany	For Kriegsmarine
25 January	Bairoko	Commencement Bay-class escort carrier	Todd Pacific Shipyards	Tacoma, Washington	United States	
25 January	Halton R. Carey	Liberty ship	J. A. Jones Construction Co.	Brunswick, Georgia	United States	For War Shipping Administration.
25 January	U-4707	Type XXIII submarine	Germaniawerft	Kiel	Germany	For Kriegsmarine
25 January	Wallace M. Tyler	Liberty ship	Todd Houston Shipbuilding Corporation	Houston, Texas	United States	For War Shipping Administration.
26 January	Adria Victory	Victory ship	Oregon Shipbuilding Corporation	Portland, Oregon	United States	For War Shipping Administration.
26 January	Anniston Victory	Victory ship	Permanente Metals Corporation	Richmond, California	United States	For War Shipping Administration.
26 January	LST 3027	Landing Ship, Tank Mk.3	Blyth Dry Docks & Shipbuilding Co. Ltd	Blyth, Northumberland	United Kingdom	For Royal Navy.
26 January	Pontotoc Victory	Victory ship	Bethlehem Fairfield Shipyard	Baltimore, Maryland	United States	For War Shipping Administration.
26 January	U-2365	Type XXIII submarine	Deutsche Werft AG	Hamburg	Germany	For Kriegsmarine
27 January	Arlie Clark	Liberty ship	Southeastern Shipbuilding Corporation	Savannah, Georgia	United States	For War Shipping Administration.
27 January	Clarksdake Victory	Victory ship	California Shipbuilding Corporation	Los Angeles, California	United States	For War Shipping Administration.
27 January	Francis A. Retka	Liberty ship	New England Shipbuilding Corporation	South Portland, Maine	United States	For War Shipping Administration.
27 January	Harvard Victory	Victory ship	Permanente Metals Corporation	Richmond, California	United States	For War Shipping Administration.
27 January	Leon S. Merrill	Liberty ship	New England Shipbuilding Corporation	South Portland, Maine	United States	For War Shipping Administration.
27 January	Raymond Van Brogan	Liberty ship	J. A. Jones Construction Company	Panama City, Florida	United States	For War Shipping Administration.
27 January	U-3036	Type XXI submarine	AG Weser	Bremen	Germany	For Kriegsmarine
27 January	U-3529	Type XXI submarine	Schichau-Werke	Danzig	Germany	For Kriegsmarine
27 January	U-3530	Type XXI submarine	Schichau-Werke	Danzig	Germany	For Kriegsmarine
27 January	VIC 80	Improved VIC lighter	Richards Ironworks Ltd.	Lowestoft	United Kingdom	For the Admiralty.
29 January	Agincourt	Battle-class destroyer	R. & W. Hawthorn, Leslie & Company Limited	Newcastle upon Tyne	United Kingdom	
29 January	Egidia	Cargo ship	Lithgows Ltd.	Port Glasgow	United Kingdom	For Anchor Line Ltd.
29 January	Empire Freetown	Cargo ship	Burntisland Shipbuilding Company	Burntisland	United Kingdom	For Ministry of War Transport.
29 January	Empire Tavistock	Coastal tanker	Grangemouth Dockyard Co. Ltd.	Grangemouth	United Kingdom	For Ministry of War Transport.
29 January	TID 135	TID-class tug	Richard Dunston Ltd.	Thorne	United Kingdom	For Government of Burma.
30 January	Clarksville Victory	Victory ship	Bethlehem Fairfield Shipyard	Baltimore, Maryland	United States	For War Shipping Administration.
30 January	Fred Herrling	Liberty ship	St. Johns River Shipbuilding Company	Jacksonville, Florida	United States	For War Shipping Administration.
30 January	Harold Dossett	Liberty ship	J. A. Jones Construction Co.	Brunswick, Georgia	United States	For War Shipping Administration.
30 January	Jefferson Victory	Victory ship	Oregon Shipbuilding Corporation	Portland, Oregon	United States	For War Shipping Administration.
30 January	Palo Duro	T2 Tanker	Alabama Drydock and Shipbuilding Company	Mobile, Alabama	United States	For War Shipping Administration.
30 January	Signal Hills	T2 tanker	Marinship Corporation	Sausalito, California	United States	For United States Maritime Commission.
30 January	Stork	Cargo ship	Henry Robb Ltd.	Leith	United Kingdom	For General Steam Navigation Co. Ltd.
31 January	Alhambra Victory	Victory ship	California Shipbuilding Corporation	Los Angeles, California	United States	For War Shipping Administration.
31 January	Crow Wing	T2 Tanker	Alabama Drydock and Shipbuilding Company	Mobile, Alabama	United States	For War Shipping Administration.
31 January	LST 3042	LST	Harland & Wolff	Govan	United Kingdom	For Royal Navy
31 January	Moline Victory	Victory ship	Permanente Metals Corporation	Richmond, California	United States	For War Shipping Administration.
31 January	Thomas W. Murray	Liberty ship	Southeastern Shipbuilding Corporation	Savannah, Georgia	United States	For War Shipping Administration.
31 January	U-3037	Type XXI submarine	AG Weser	Bremen	Germany	For Kriegsmarine
31 January	VIC 76	VIC lighter	Rowhedge Ironworks Co. Ltd.	Rowhedge	United Kingdom	For the Admiralty.
31 January	William J. Riddle	Liberty ship	J. A. Jones Construction Company	Panama City, Florida	United States	For War Shipping Administration.
31 January	William W. Johnson	Liberty ship	Todd Houston Shipbuilding Corporation	Houston, Texas	United States	For War Shipping Administration.
31 January	Yale Victory	Victory ship	Permanente Metals Corporation	Richmond, California	United States	For War Shipping Administration.
January	MFV-230	Naval Motor Fishing Vessel	Anderson, Rigden & Perkins Ltd.	Whitstable	United Kingdom	For Royal Navy.
January	VIC 74	VIC lighter	Brown's Shipbuilding & Dry Dock Co. Ltd.	Hull	United Kingdom	For the Admiralty.
1 February	Lake Charles Victory	Victory ship	Bethlehem Fairfield Shipyard	Baltimore, Maryland	United States	For War Shipping Administration.
2 February	Bernard L. Rodman	Liberty ship	Todd Houston Shipbuilding Corporation	Houston, Texas	United States	For War Shipping Administration.
2 February	Rutgers Victory	Victory ship	California Shipbuilding Corporation	Los Angeles, California	United States	For War Shipping Administration.
2 February	Terre Hault Victory	Victory ship	Oregon Shipbuilding Corporation	Portland, Oregon	United States	For War Shipping Administration.
3 February	James A. Butts	Liberty ship	New England Shipbuilding Corporation	South Portland, Maine	United States	For War Shipping Administration.
3 February	Middlebury Victory	Victory ship	Permanente Metals Corporation	Richmond, California	United States	For War Shipping Administration.
4 February	Leonardo L. Romero	Liberty ship	Todd Houston Shipbuilding Corporation	Houston, Texas	United States	For War Shipping Administration.
5 February	Darel M. Ritter	Liberty ship	Delta Shipbuilding	New Orleans, Louisiana	United States	For War Shipping Administration.
5 February	Morganstown Victory	Victory ship	Bethlehem Fairfield Shipyard	Baltimore, Maryland	United States	For War Shipping Administration.
6 February	Twin Falls Victory	Victory ship	Oregon Shipbuilding Corporation	Portland, Oregon	United States	For War Shipping Administration.
7 February	DePauw Victory	Victory ship	Permanente Metals Corporation	Richmond, California	United States	For War Shipping Administration.
7 February	Roy K. Johnson	Liberty ship	Delta Shipbuilding	New Orleans, Louisiana	United States	For War Shipping Administration.
7 February	Shahristan	Cargo ship	John Readhead & Sons Ltd.	South Shields	United Kingdom	For Strick Line.
7 February	TID 136	TID-class tug	Richard Dunston Ltd.	Thorne	United Kingdom	Transfer to Government of Burma cancelled, to the Admiralty in 1948.
8 February	Dudley H. Thomas	Liberty ship	J. A. Jones Construction Company	Panama City, Florida	United States	For War Shipping Administration.
8 February	U-4709	Type XXIII submarine	Germaniawerft	Kiel	Germany	For Kriegsmarine
8 February	Ventura Hills	T2 tanker	Marinship Corporation	Sausalito, California	United States	For United States Maritime Commission.
9 February	Dickinson Victory	Victory ship	California Shipbuilding Corporation	Los Angeles, California	United States	For War Shipping Administration.
9 February	Paducah Victory	Victory ship	Oregon Shipbuilding Corporation	Portland, Oregon	United States	For War Shipping Administration.
9 February	U-2543	Type XXI submarine	Blohm + Voss	Hamburg	Germany	For Kriegsmarine
9 February	U-2544	Type XXI submarine	Blohm + Voss	Hamburg	Germany	For Kriegsmarine
9 February	Willard R. Johnson	Liberty ship	Todd Houston Shipbuilding Corporation	Houston, Texas	United States	For War Shipping Administration.
10 February	Bucknell Victory	Victory ship	Permanente Metals Corporation	Richmond, California	United States	For War Shipping Administration.
10 February	Clarence F. Peck	Liberty ship	New England Shipbuilding Corporation	South Portland, Maine	United States	For War Shipping Administration.
10 February	Meadowbank	Cargo ship	William Doxford & Sons Ltd.	Pallion	United Kingdom	For Bank Line Ltd.
10 February	Medina Victory	Victory ship	Permanente Metals Corporation	Richmond, California	United States	For War Shipping Administration.
10 February	Patrick S. Mahony	Liberty ship	J. A. Jones Construction Co.	Brunswick, Georgia	United States	For War Shipping Administration.
10 February	Pittston Victory	Victory ship	Bethlehem Fairfield Shipyard	Baltimore, Maryland	United States	For War Shipping Administration.
10 February	U-3040	Type XXI submarine	AG Weser	Bremen	Germany	For Kriegsmarine
10 February	U-3531	Type XXI submarine	Schichau-Werke	Danzig	Germany	For Kriegsmarine
10 February	U-3532	Type XXI submarine	Schichau-Werke	Danzig	Germany	For Kriegsmarine
12 February	Empire Aden	Cargo ship	Bartram & Sons Ltd	Sunderland	United Kingdom	For Ministry of War Transport
12 February	Empire Nairobi	Cargo ship	Short Brothers Ltd.	Sunderland	United Kingdom	For Ministry of War Transport.
12 February	LST 3011	Landing Ship, Tank	Harland & Wolff	Belfast	United Kingdom	For Royal Navy.
13 February	Colby Victory	Victory ship	California Shipbuilding Corporation	Los Angeles, California	United States	For War Shipping Administration.
13 February	Pawnee Rock	T2 Tanker	Alabama Drydock and Shipbuilding Company	Mobile, Alabama	United States	For War Shipping Administration.
13 February	Samuel L. Jeffery	Liberty ship	Todd Houston Shipbuilding Corporation	Houston, Texas	United States	For War Shipping Administration.
13 February	Thomas L. Haley	Liberty ship	St. Johns River Shipbuilding Company	Jacksonville, Florida	United States	For War Shipping Administration.
13 February	Hagerstown Victory	Victory ship	Bethlehem Fairfield Shipyard	Baltimore, Maryland	United States	For War Shipping Administration.
13 February	U-4704	Type XXIII submarine	Germaniawerft	Kiel	Germany	For Kriegsmarine
13 February	U-3041	Type XXI submarine	AG Weser	Bremen	Germany	For Kriegsmarine
14 February	Grinnell Victory	Victory ship	Permanente Metals Corporation	Richmond, California	United States	For War Shipping Administration.
14 February	John L. McCarley	Liberty ship	J. A. Jones Construction Company	Panama City, Florida	United States	For War Shipping Administration.
14 February	TID 137	TID-class tug	Richard Dunston Ltd.	Thorne	United Kingdom	Transfer to Government of Burma cancelled. To Tanganyika Railways in 1948 as Plover.
14 February	U-3533	Type XXI submarine	Schichau-Werke	Danzig	Germany	For Kriegsmarine
14 February	U-3534	Type XXI submarine	Schichau-Werke	Danzig	Germany	For Kriegsmarine
14 February	U-3039	Type XXI submarine	AG Weser	Bremen	Germany	For Kriegsmarine
15 February	Dartmouth Victory	Victory ship	Oregon Shipbuilding Corporation	Portland, Oregon	United States	For War Shipping Administration.
15 February	Badoeng Strait	Commencement Bay-class escort carrier	Todd Pacific Shipyards	Tacoma, Washington	United States	
15 February	Bardstown Victory	Victory ship	Bethlehem Fairfield Shipyard	Baltimore, Maryland	United States	For War Shipping Administration.
15 February	I-205	I-201-class submarine	Kure Naval Arsenal	Kure, Hiroshima	Japan	For Imperial Japanese Navy
15 February	Petrel	Coaster	Goole Shipbuilding & Repairing Co. Ltd.	Goole	United Kingdom	For General Steam Navigation Co. Ltd.
15 February	Start Bay	Bay-class frigate	Harland & Wolff	Belfast	United Kingdom	For Royal Navy.
16 February	Renselaer Victory	Victory ship	California Shipbuilding Corporation	Los Angeles, California	United States	For War Shipping Administration.
17 February	Clifford E. Ashby	Liberty ship	Todd Houston Shipbuilding Corporation	Houston, Texas	United States	For War Shipping Administration.
17 February	Mount Holyoke Victory	Victory ship	Permanente Metals Corporation	Richmond, California	United States	For War Shipping Administration.
17 February	Puente Hills	T2 tanker	Marinship Corporation	Sausalito, California	United States	For United States Maritime Commission.
17 February	Richard A. Van Pelt	Liberty ship	J. A. Jones Construction Co.	Brunswick, Georgia	United States	For War Shipping Administration.
17 February	U-2366	Type XXIII submarine	Deutsche Werft AG	Hamburg	Germany	For Kriegsmarine
19 February	Milford Victory	Victory ship	Bethlehem Fairfield Shipyard	Baltimore, Maryland	United States	For War Shipping Administration.
19 February	Princeton Victory	Victory ship	Permanente Metals Corporation	Richmond, California	United States	For War Shipping Administration.
19 February	Sandy Lake	T2 Tanker	Alabama Drydock and Shipbuilding Company	Mobile, Alabama	United States	For War Shipping Administration.
19 February	U-2546	Type XXI submarine	Blohm + Voss	Hamburg	Germany	For Kriegsmarine
20 February	Colgate Victory	Victory ship	Oregon Shipbuilding Corporation	Portland, Oregon	United States	For War Shipping Administration.
20 February	Donald H. Holland	Liberty ship	New England Shipbuilding Corporation	South Portland, Maine	United States	For War Shipping Administration.
20 February	TID 138	TID-class tug	Richard Dunston Ltd.	Thorne	United Kingdom	Transfer to Government of Burma cancelled. To Tanganyika Railways in 1948 as Lapwing.
20 February	Vernon S. Hood	Liberty ship	J. A. Jones Construction Company	Panama City, Florida	United States	For War Shipping Administration.
21 February	Charles N. Cole	Liberty ship	New England Shipbuilding Corporation	South Portland, Maine	United States	For War Shipping Administration.
21 February	Donald S. Wright	Liberty ship	Delta Shipbuilding	New Orleans, Louisiana	United States	For War Shipping Administration.
21 February	Duke Victory	Victory ship	Permanente Metals Corporation	Richmond, California	United States	For War Shipping Administration.
	George A. Lawson	Liberty ship	New England Shipbuilding Corporation	South Portland, Maine	United States	For War Shipping Administration.
21 February	Linton Seam	Liberty ship	Delta Shipbuilding	New Orleans, Louisiana	United States	For War Shipping Administration.
21 February	U-4711	Type XXIII submarine	Germaniawerft	Kiel	Germany	For Kriegsmarine
21 February	William Bevan	Liberty ship	New England Shipbuilding Corporation	South Portland, Maine	United States	For War Shipping Administration.
22 February	Maryville Victory	Victory ship	California Shipbuilding Corporation	Los Angeles, California	United States	For War Shipping Administration.
22 February	Piqua	T2 Tanker	Alabama Drydock and Shipbuilding Company	Mobile, Alabama	United States	For War Shipping Administration.
22 February	U-2545	Type XXI submarine	Blohm + Voss	Hamburg	Germany	For Kriegsmarine
23 February	Alfred L. Baxley	Liberty ship	Todd Houston Shipbuilding Corporation	Houston, Texas	United States	For War Shipping Administration.
23 February	Coaldale Victory	Victory ship	Bethlehem Fairfield Shipyard	Baltimore, Maryland	United States	For War Shipping Administration.
23 February	Brown Victory	Victory ship	Oregon Shipbuilding Corporation	Portland, Oregon	United States	For War Shipping Administration.
23 February	U-2367	Type XXIII submarine	Deutsche Werft AG	Hamburg	Germany	For Kriegsmarine
24 February	Bowdoin Victory	Victory ship	Permanente Metals Corporation	Richmond, California	United States	For War Shipping Administration.
24 February	Fordham Victory	Victory ship	Permanente Metals Corporation	Richmond, California	United States	For War Shipping Administration.
24 February	Francis E. Siltz	Liberty ship	Todd Houston Shipbuilding Corporation	Houston, Texas	United States	For War Shipping Administration.
24 February	La Brea Hills	T2 tanker	Marinship Corporation	Sausalito, California	United States	For United States Maritime Commission.
24 February	Mahanoy City Victory	Victory ship	Bethlehem Fairfield Shipyard	Baltimore, Maryland	United States	For War Shipping Administration.
24 February	Norwich Victory	Victory ship	California Shipbuilding Corporation	Los Angeles, California	United States	For War Shipping Administration.
25 February	Charles C. Randelman	Liberty ship	J. A. Jones Construction Co.	Brunswick, Georgia	United States	For War Shipping Administration.
25 February	Fargo	Fargo-class cruiser	New York Shipbuilding Corporation	Camden, New Jersey	United States	
25 February	Northwind	Wind-class icebreaker	Western Pipe and Steel Company	San Pedro, California	United States	To replace USCGC Northwind (WAG-278)
26 February	Cawsand Bay	Bay-class frigate	Blyth Dry Docks & Shipbuilding Co. Ltd	Blyth, Northumberland	United Kingdom	For Royal Navy.
26 February	Fort Pitt	T2 Tanker	Alabama Drydock and Shipbuilding Company	Mobile, Alabama	United States	For War Shipping Administration.
26 February	TID 139	TID-class tug	Richard Dunston Ltd.	Thorne	United Kingdom	For Government of Burma.
27 February	Davidson Victory	Victory ship	Oregon Shipbuilding Corporation	Portland, Oregon	United States	For War Shipping Administration.
27 February	Edwin D. Howard	Liberty ship	J. A. Jones Construction Company	Panama City, Florida	United States	For War Shipping Administration.
27 February	Empire Seascape	Shelt-type coaster	Goole Shipbuilding & Repairing Co Ltd	Goole	United Kingdom	For Ministry of War Transport.
27 February	Powerful	Majestic-class aircraft carrier	Harland and Wolff	Belfast	United Kingdom	Sold to Canada as HMCS Bonaventure
27 February	Pundua	Cargo ship	William Doxford & Sons Ltd.	Pallion	United Kingdom	For British India Steam Navigation Co. Ltd. Ltd.
28 February	Amherst Victory	Victory ship	California Shipbuilding Corporation	Los Angeles, California	United States	For War Shipping Administration.
28 February	Citadel Victory	Victory ship	Permanente Metals Corporation	Richmond, California	United States	For War Shipping Administration.
28 February	Defoe	Cargo ship	Harland & Wolff	Belfast	United Kingdom	For Lamport & Holt.
28 February	Empire Caicos	Empire Malta-class Scandinavian type cargo ship	William Gray & Co Ltd	West Hartlepool, England	United Kingdom	For Ministry of War Transport.
28 February	Lawrence J. Gallagher	Liberty ship	Delta Shipbuilding	New Orleans, Louisiana	United States	For War Shipping Administration.
28 February	Majestic	Majestic-class aircraft carrier	Vickers-Armstrong Limited	Barrow-in-Furness, England	United Kingdom	Sold to Australia as HMAS Melbourne
28 February	Roy James Cole	Liberty ship	J. A. Jones Construction Co.	Brunswick, Georgia	United States	For War Shipping Administration.
28 February	Sideling Hill	T2 Tanker	Alabama Drydock and Shipbuilding Company	Mobile, Alabama	United States	For War Shipping Administration.
28 February	Wesleyan Victory	Victory ship	Permanente Metals Corporation	Richmond, California	United States	For War Shipping Administration.
February	Empire Seabeach	Shelt-type coaster	Henry Scarr Ltd.	Hessle	United Kingdom	For Ministry of War Transport.
February	Empire Seasheltie	Shelt-type coaster	Henry Scarr Ltd.	Hessle	United Kingdom	For Ministry of War Transport.
February	Empire Seaforth	Coaster	Shipbuilding Corporation	Newcastle upon Tyne	United Kingdom	For Ministry of War Transport
1 March	Empire Prome	Cargo ship	Shipbuilding Corporation Ltd.	Sunderland	United Kingdom	For Ministry of War Transport.
1 March	U-4712	Type XXIII submarine	Germaniawerft	Kiel	Germany	For Kriegsmarine
1 March	U-3044	Type XXI submarine	AG Weser	Bremen	Germany	For Kriegsmarine
1 March	VIC 77	VIC lighter	Rowhedge Ironworks Co. Ltd.	Rowhedge	United Kingdom	For the Admiralty.
2 March	Northwestern Victory	Victory ship	Oregon Shipbuilding Corporation	Portland, Oregon	United States	For War Shipping Administration.
2 March	TID 140	TID-class tug	Richard Dunston Ltd.	Thorne	United Kingdom	Transfer the Government of Burma cancelled. To the Admiralty in 1948.
2 March	Tufts Victory	Victory ship	California Shipbuilding Corporation	Los Angeles, California	United States	For War Shipping Administration.
3 March	Berea Victory	Victory ship	Permanente Metals Corporation	Richmond, California	United States	For War Shipping Administration.
3 March	Kingston Victory	Victory ship	Bethlehem Fairfield Shipyard	Baltimore, Maryland	United States	For War Shipping Administration.
3 March	Macquarie	River-class frigate	Mort's Dock and Engineering	Balmain, New South Wales	Australia	
3 March	Santa Maria Hills	T2 tanker	Marinship Corporation	Sausalito, California	United States	For United States Maritime Commission.
3 March	Wilfred R. Bellevue	Liberty ship	New England Shipbuilding Corporation	South Portland, Maine	United States	For War Shipping Administration.
6 March	Baylor Victory	Victory ship	California Shipbuilding Corporation	Los Angeles, California	United States	For War Shipping Administration.
6 March	Furman Victory	Victory ship	Oregon Shipbuilding Corporation	Portland, Oregon	United States	For War Shipping Administration.
6 March	U-3045	Type XXI submarine	AG Weser	Bremen	Germany	For Kriegsmarine
6 March	VIC 61	VIC lighter	Isaac Pimblott & Sons Ltd.	Northwich	United Kingdom	For the Admiralty.
6 March	VIC 93	VIC lighter	Richard Dunston Ltd.	Thorne	United Kingdom	For the Admiralty.
6 March	Winchester Victory	Victory ship	Bethlehem Fairfield Shipyard	Baltimore, Maryland	United States	For War Shipping Administration.
7 March	Charles H. Lanham	Liberty ship	Todd Houston Shipbuilding Corporation	Houston, Texas	United States	For War Shipping Administration.
7 March	St. Lawrence Victory	Victory ship	Permanente Metals Corporation	Richmond, California	United States	For War Shipping Administration.
7 March	TID 141	TID-class tug	Richard Dunston Ltd.	Thorne	United Kingdom	For Ministry of War Transport.
7 March	Wesley W. Barrett	Liberty ship	J. A. Jones Construction Company	Panama City, Florida	United States	For War Shipping Administration.
7 March	Xavier Victory	Victory ship	Permanente Metals Corporation	Richmond, California	United States	For War Shipping Administration.
8 March	New Bern Victory	Victory ship	Bethlehem Fairfield Shipyard	Baltimore, Maryland	United States	For War Shipping Administration.
9 March	Notre Dame Victory	Victory ship	Oregon Shipbuilding Corporation	Portland, Oregon	United States	For War Shipping Administration.
9 March	Santa Clara Victory	Victory ship	California Shipbuilding Corporation	Los Angeles, California	United States	For War Shipping Administration.
9 March	U-2547	Type XXI submarine	Blohm + Voss	Hamburg	Germany	For Kriegsmarine
9 March	U-2548	Type XXI submarine	Blohm + Voss	Hamburg	Germany	For Kriegsmarine
10 March	Central Victory	Victory ship	Permanente Metals Corporation	Richmond, California	United States	For War Shipping Administration.
10 March	U-3046	Type XXI submarine	AG Weser	Bremen	Germany	For Kriegsmarine
12 March	British Virtue	Tanker	Swan, Hunter & Wigham Richardson Ltd.	Newcastle upon Tyne	United Kingdom	For British Tanker Co. Ltd.
12 March	Fred E. Joyce	Liberty ship	New England Shipbuilding Corporation	South Portland, Maine	United States	For War Shipping Administration.
12 March	LST 3012	Landing Ship, Tank	Harland & Wolff	Belfast	United Kingdom	For Royal Navy.
12 March	Mark A. Davis	Liberty ship	Todd Houston Shipbuilding Corporation	Houston, Texas	United States	For War Shipping Administration.
12 March	Stamford Victory	Victory ship	Bethlehem Fairfield Shipyard	Baltimore, Maryland	United States	For War Shipping Administration.
13 March	Blue Licks	T2 Tanker	Alabama Drydock and Shipbuilding Company	Mobile, Alabama	United States	For War Shipping Administration.
13 March	Empire Joy	Standard Fast type cargo liner	J. L. Thompson & Sons Ltd.	Sunderland	United Kingdom	For Ministry of War Transport.
13 March	George N. Drake	Liberty ship	New England Shipbuilding Corporation	South Portland, Maine	United States	For War Shipping Administration.
13 March	Kern Hills	T2 tanker	Marinship Corporation	Sausalito, California	United States	For United States Maritime Commission.
13 March	Merrimac Seam	Liberty ship	Delta Shipbuilding	New Orleans, Louisiana	United States	For War Shipping Administration.
13 March	Richard D. Lyons	Liberty ship	New England Shipbuilding Corporation	South Portland, Maine	United States	For War Shipping Administration.
13 March	Westminster Victory	Victory ship	Oregon Shipbuilding Corporation	Portland, Oregon	United States	For War Shipping Administration.
14 March	Beaver Victory	Victory ship	California Shipbuilding Corporation	Los Angeles, California	United States	For War Shipping Administration.
14 March	Borus	Standard Fast type tanker	Sir James Laing & Sons Ltd.	Sunderland	United Kingdom	For Oil & Molasses Tankers Ltd.
14 March	Mercer Victory	Victory ship	Permanente Metals Corporation	Richmond, California	United States	For War Shipping Administration.
14 March	Swarthmore Victory	Victory ship	Permanente Metals Corporation	Richmond, California	United States	For War Shipping Administration.
15 March	Edward N. Hinton	Liberty ship	Todd Houston Shipbuilding Corporation	Houston, Texas	United States	For War Shipping Administration.
15 March	Empire Prospect	Cargo ship	Shipbuilding Corporation Ltd.	Newcastle upon Tyne	United Kingdom	For Ministry of War Transport.
15 March	Empire Wapping	Icemaid type collier	Grangemouth Dockyard Co. Ltd.	Grangemouth	United Kingdom	For Ministry of War Transport.
15 March	Pachumba	Cargo ship	William Gray & Co. Ltd.	West Hartlepool	United Kingdom	For British India Steam Navigation Co. Ltd.
15 March	Patrick B. Whalen	Liberty ship	J. A. Jones Construction Co.	Brunswick, Georgia	United States	For War Shipping Administration.
15 March	Warren P. Marks	Liberty ship	J. A. Jones Construction Company	Panama City, Florida	United States	For War Shipping Administration.
16 March	Attleboro Victory	Victory ship	Bethlehem Fairfield Shipyard	Baltimore, Maryland	United States	For War Shipping Administration.
16 March	Empire Belgrave	Coastal tanker	A & J Inglis Ltd	Glasgow	United Kingdom	For Ministry of War Transport
16 March	Empire Flora	Stella-type tug	Cochrane & Sons Ltd.	Selby	United Kingdom	For Ministry of War Transport.
16 March	Empire Stella	Stella-type tug	Cochrane & Sons Ltd.	Selby	United Kingdom	For Ministry of War Transport.
16 March	Firebeam	Collier	Hall, Russell & Co. Ltd.	Aberdeen	United Kingdom	For Gas, Light & Coke Co. Ltd.
16 March	Wellesley Victory	Victory ship	Oregon Shipbuilding Corporation	Portland, Oregon	United States	For War Shipping Administration.
17 March	Carleton Victory	Victory ship	Permanente Metals Corporation	Richmond, California	United States	For War Shipping Administration.
17 March	Elias Reisberg	Liberty ship	New England Shipbuilding Corporation	South Portland, Maine	United States	For War Shipping Administration.
17 March	Empire Seashore	Shelt-type coaster	Goole Shipbuilding & Repairing Co Ltd	Goole	United Kingdom	For Ministry of War Transport.
17 March	Lehigh Victory	Victory ship	California Shipbuilding Corporation	Los Angeles, California	United States	For War Shipping Administration.
17 March	Saidor	Commencement Bay-class escort carrier	Todd Pacific Shipyards	Tacoma, Washington	United States	
19 March	Laconia Victory	Victory ship	Bethlehem Fairfield Shipyard	Baltimore, Maryland	United States	For War Shipping Administration.
19 March	U-2368	Type XXIII submarine	Deutsche Werft AG	Hamburg	Germany	For Kriegsmarine
19 March	VIC 94	VIC lighter	Richard Dunston Ltd.	Thorne	United Kingdom	For the Admiralty.
20 March	Midway	Midway-class aircraft carrier	Newport News Shipbuilding	Newport News, Virginia	United States	First in class
20 March	Redstone Seam	Liberty ship	Delta Shipbuilding	New Orleans, Louisiana	United States	For War Shipping Administration.
21 March	Creighton Victory	Victory ship	Oregon Shipbuilding Corporation	Portland, Oregon	United States	For War Shipping Administration.
21 March	Elwood Hills	T2 tanker	Marinship Corporation	Sausalito, California	United States	For United States Maritime Commission.
21 March	Loyola Victory	Victory ship	Permanente Metals Corporation	Richmond, California	United States	For War Shipping Administration.
21 March	Manipur	Cargo ship	William Hamilton & Co. Ltd.	Port Glasgow	United Kingdom	For T. & J. Brocklebank Ltd.
21 March	Oberlin Victory	Victory ship	Permanente Metals Corporation	Richmond, California	United States	For War Shipping Administration.
22 March	Wheaton Victory	Victory ship	California Shipbuilding Corporation	Los Angeles, California	United States	For War Shipping Administration.
23 March	Central Falls Victory	Victory ship	Bethlehem Fairfield Shipyard	Baltimore, Maryland	United States	For War Shipping Administration.
23 March	Golden Hill	T2 Tanker	Alabama Drydock and Shipbuilding Company	Mobile, Alabama	United States	For War Shipping Administration.
23 March	Frank O. Peterson	Liberty ship	J. A. Jones Construction Company	Panama City, Florida	United States	For War Shipping Administration.
24 March	Purdue Victory	Victory ship	Permanente Metals Corporation	Richmond, California	United States	For War Shipping Administration.
24 March	U-2369	Type XXIII submarine	Deutsche Werft AG	Hamburg	Germany	For Kriegsmarine
24 March	U-4708	Type XXIII submarine	Germaniawerft	Kiel	Germany	For Kriegsmarine
26 March	East Point Victory	Victory ship	Bethlehem Fairfield Shipyard	Baltimore, Maryland	United States	For War Shipping Administration.
26 March	Empire Admiral	Heavy lift ship	Vickers-Armstrongs Ltd.	Barrow in Furness	United Kingdom	For Ministry of War Transport.
26 March	I-206	I-201-class submarine	Kure Naval Arsenal	Kure, Hiroshima	Japan	For Imperial Japanese Navy
26 March	Rider Victory	Victory ship	California Shipbuilding Corporation	Los Angeles, California	United States	For War Shipping Administration.
27 March	Empire Maya	C-type coaster	S. P. Austin & Sons Ltd	Sunderland	United Kingdom	For Ministry of War Transport.
27 March	Regent Hawk	Tanker	Swan, Hunter & Wigham Richardson Ltd.	Wallsend	United Kingdom	For Trinidad Leaseholds Ltd.
27 March	Sasbeck	Cargo ship	Flensburger Schiffbau-Gesellschaft	Flensburg	Germany	
27 March	Temple Victory	Victory ship	Oregon Shipbuilding Corporation	Portland, Oregon	United States	For War Shipping Administration.
28 March	Empire Seabrook	Coaster	Shipbuilding Corporation	Newcastle upon Tyne	United Kingdom	For Ministry of War Transport
28 March	Joseph Carrigan	Liberty ship	New England Shipbuilding Corporation	South Portland, Maine	United States	For War Shipping Administration.
28 March	Lawrence T. Sullivan	Liberty ship	New England Shipbuilding Corporation	South Portland, Maine	United States	For War Shipping Administration.
28 March	Roc	Aircraft transport ship	Blyth Dry Docks & Shipbuilding Co. Ltd	Blyth, Northumberland	United Kingdom	For Royal Navy.
28 March	Tulane Victory	Victory ship	Permanente Metals Corporation	Richmond, California	United States	For War Shipping Administration.
28 March	VIC 99	VIC lighter	J. Harker Ltd.	Knottingley	United Kingdom	For the Admiralty.
29 March	Ambassador	Cargo ship	William Doxford & Sons Ltd.	Pallion	United Kingdom	For Hall Bros. Steamship Co. Ltd.
29 March	Borus	Intermediate type tanker	Sir J. Laing & Sons Ltd.	Sunderland	United Kingdom	For Anglo-Saxon Petroleum Co. Ltd.
29 March	British Might	Tanker	Harland & Wolff Ltd.	Govan	United Kingdom	For British Tanker Co. Ltd.
29 March	Empire Kew	Tudor Queen type coaster	Johh Lewis & Sons Ltd.	Aberdeen	United Kingdom	For .
29 March	Torrance Hills	T2 tanker	Marinship Corporation	Sausalito, California	United States	For United States Maritime Commission.
29 March	Tremadoc Bay	Bay-class frigate	Harland & Wolff	Belfast	United Kingdom	For Royal Navy.
29 March	Wave Regent	Wave-class oiler	Furness Shipbuilding Co. Ltd.	Haverton Hill-on-Tees	United Kingdom	For Royal Fleet Auxiliary.
29 March	Woodbridge Victory	Victory ship	Bethlehem Fairfield Shipyard	Baltimore, Maryland	United States	For War Shipping Administration.
30 March	Barney Kirschbaum	Liberty ship	J. A. Jones Construction Company	Panama City, Florida	United States	For War Shipping Administration.
30 March	Cornell Victory	Victory ship	California Shipbuilding Corporation	Los Angeles, California	United States	For War Shipping Administration.
30 March	Empire Sheila	Stella-type tug	Cochrane & Sons Ltd.	Selby	United Kingdom	For Ministry of War Transport.
30 March	War Bonnet	T2 Tanker	Alabama Drydock and Shipbuilding Company	Mobile, Alabama	United States	For War Shipping Administration.
30 March	Willamette Victory	Victory ship	Oregon Shipbuilding Corporation	Portland, Oregon	United States	For War Shipping Administration.
30 March	William H. Lane	Liberty ship	New England Shipbuilding Corporation	South Portland, Maine	United States	For War Shipping Administration.
31 March	U-2551	Type XXI submarine	Blohm + Voss	Hamburg	Germany	For Kriegsmarine
31 March	U-2552	Type XXI submarine	Blohm + Voss	Hamburg	Germany	For Kriegsmarine
31 March	Wake Forest Victory	Victory ship	Permanente Metals Corporation	Richmond, California	United States	For War Shipping Administration.
March	Empire Seahawk	Shelt-type coaster	Henry Scarr Ltd.	Hessle	United Kingdom	For Ministry of War Transport.
March	Empire Seafront	Shelt-type coaster	Henry Scarr Ltd.	Hessle	United Kingdom	For Ministry of War Transport.
March	LST 3006	Landing Ship, Tank	Harland & Wolff Ltd.	Belfast	United Kingdom	For Royal Navy.
2 April	Empire Heathland	Hopper ship	Fleming & Ferguson Ltd.	Paisley	United Kingdom	For Ministry of War Transport.
2 April	TID 145	TID-class tug	Richard Dunston Ltd.	Thorne	United Kingdom	For the Admiralty.
2 April	Wooster Victory	Victory ship	California Shipbuilding Corporation	Los Angeles, California	United States	For War Shipping Administration.
3 April	Emory Victory	Victory ship	Bethlehem Fairfield Shipyard	Baltimore, Maryland	United States	For War Shipping Administration.
3 April	Frederick Austin	Liberty ship	New England Shipbuilding Corporation	South Portland, Maine	United States	For War Shipping Administration.
3 April	Jewell Seam	Liberty ship	Delta Shipbuilding	New Orleans, Louisiana	United States	For War Shipping Administration.
3 April	Reed Victory	Victory ship	Oregon Shipbuilding Corporation	Portland, Oregon	United States	For War Shipping Administration.
4 April	Radcliffe Victory	Victory ship	Permanente Metals Corporation	Richmond, California	United States	For War Shipping Administration.
5 April	Calvin Victory	Victory ship	California Shipbuilding Corporation	Los Angeles, California	United States	For War Shipping Administration.
6 April	Mary Cullom Kimbro	Liberty ship	J. A. Jones Construction Company	Panama City, Florida	United States	For War Shipping Administration.
6 April	Rock Hill Victory	Victory ship	Bethlehem Fairfield Shipyard	Baltimore, Maryland	United States	For War Shipping Administration.
6 April	Simmons Victory	Victory ship	Oregon Shipbuilding Corporation	Portland, Oregon	United States	For War Shipping Administration.
7 April	Drexel Victory	Victory ship	Permanente Metals Corporation	Richmond, California	United States	For War Shipping Administration.
7 April	Bon Air Seam	Liberty ship	Delta Shipbuilding	New Orleans, Louisiana	United States	For War Shipping Administration.
8 April	Santa Fe Hills	T2 tanker	Marinship Corporation	Sausalito, California	United States	For United States Maritime Commission.
10 April	Brandon Victory	Victory ship	Bethlehem Fairfield Shipyard	Baltimore, Maryland	United States	For War Shipping Administration.
10 April	Capital Victory	Victory ship	Oregon Shipbuilding Corporation	Portland, Oregon	United States	For War Shipping Administration.
10 April	Lyngdalsfjord	Trawler	Kaldnes Mekaniske Verksted	Tønsberg	Norway	For the Kriegsmarine
10 April	TID 142	TID-class tug	Richard Dunston Ltd.	Thorne	United Kingdom	For the Admiralty.
10 April	VIC 101	Improved VIC lighter	Richards Ironworks Ltd.	Lowestoft	United Kingdom	For the Admiralty.
11 April	Alfred Victory	Victory ship	Permanente Metals Corporation	Richmond, California	United States	For War Shipping Administration.
11 April	Denison Victory	Victory ship	Permanente Metals Corporation	Richmond, California	United States	For War Shipping Administration.
11 April	Empire Crusoe	Scandinavian type cargo ship	Ailsa Shipbuilding & Co. Ltd.	Troon	United Kingdom	For Ministry of War Transport.
11 April	Honningsvaag	T2 Tanker	Alabama Drydock and Shipbuilding Company	Mobile, Alabama	United States	For War Shipping Administration.
11 April	U-3047	Type XXI submarine	AG Weser	Bremen	Germany	For Kriegsmarine
11 April	Vanderbilt Victory	Victory ship	California Shipbuilding Corporation	Los Angeles, California	United States	For War Shipping Administration.
12 April	British Wisdom	Tanker	Blythswood Shipbuilding Co. Ltd.	Glasgow	United Kingdom	For British Tanker Co. Ltd.
12 April	Empire Maymount	C-type coaster	S. P. Austin & Sons Ltd.	Sunderland	United Kingdom	For Ministry of War Transport.
12 April	Empire Seaward	Shelt-type coaster	Goole Shipbuilding & Repairing Co Ltd	Goole	United Kingdom	For Ministry of War Transport.
12 April	Fayetteville Victory	Victory ship	Bethlehem Fairfield Shipyard	Baltimore, Maryland	United States	For War Shipping Administration.
13 April	Empire Neptun	Ocean type tanker	R & W Hawthorn, Leslie & Co Ltd.	Govan	United Kingdom	For Ministry of War Transport.
13 April	Knox Victory	Victory ship	Oregon Shipbuilding Corporation	Portland, Oregon	United States	For War Shipping Administration.
13 April	Padana	Cargo ship	Burntisland Shipbuilding Company	Burntisland	United Kingdom	For British India Steam Navigation Co. Ltd.
14 April	Elwin F. Knowles	Liberty ship	New England Shipbuilding Corporation	South Portland, Maine	United States	For War Shipping Administration.
14 April	Ernest L. Dawson	Liberty ship	New England Shipbuilding Corporation	South Portland, Maine	United States	For War Shipping Administration.
14 April	Leif M. Olson	Liberty ship	New England Shipbuilding Corporation	South Portland, Maine	United States	For War Shipping Administration.
14 April	Pan American Victory	Victory ship	Permanente Metals Corporation	Richmond, California	United States	For War Shipping Administration.
14 April	Sicily	Commencement Bay-class escort carrier	Todd Pacific Shipyards	Tacoma, Washington	United States	
14 April	U-4710	Type XXIII submarine	Germaniawerft	Kiel	Germany	For Kriegsmarine
15 April	Gyatt	Gearing-class destroyer	Federal Shipbuilding and Drydock Company	Kearny, New Jersey	United States	
15 April	Pratt Victory	Victory ship	California Shipbuilding Corporation	Los Angeles, California	United States	For War Shipping Administration.
16 April	Perim	Cargo ship	Barclay, Curle & Co. Ltd.	Glasgow	United Kingdom	For Peninsular and Oriental Steam Navigation Company.
16 April	TID 143	TID-class tug	Richard Dunston Ltd.	Thorne	United Kingdom	For Chittagong Port Commissioners.
17 April	Dominguez Hills	T2 tanker	Marinship Corporation	Sausalito, California	United States	For United States Maritime Commission.
17 April	Lawrence Victory	Victory ship	Oregon Shipbuilding Corporation	Portland, Oregon	United States	For War Shipping Administration.
17 April	Westbrook Victory	Victory ship	Bethlehem Fairfield Shipyard	Baltimore, Maryland	United States	For War Shipping Administration.
18 April	Empire Cyprus	Cargo ship	Lithgows	Port Glasgow	United Kingdom	For Ministry of War Transport
18 April	Glamorgan Seam	Liberty ship	Delta Shipbuilding	New Orleans, Louisiana	United States	For War Shipping Administration.
18 April	Trinity Victory	Victory ship	Permanente Metals Corporation	Richmond, California	United States	For War Shipping Administration.
18 April	U-2371	Type XXIII submarine	Deutsche Werft AG	Hamburg	Germany	For Kriegsmarine
18 April	U-3050	Type XXI submarine	AG Weser	Bremen	Germany	For Kriegsmarine
19 April	Charles H. Shaw	Liberty ship	New England Shipbuilding Corporation	South Portland, Maine	United States	For War Shipping Administration.
19 April	Copper Union Victory	Victory ship	California Shipbuilding Corporation	Los Angeles, California	United States	For War Shipping Administration.
19 April	kathio	T2 Tanker	Alabama Drydock and Shipbuilding Company	Mobile, Alabama	United States	For War Shipping Administration.
19 April	St. Johns Victory	Victory ship	Permanente Metals Corporation	Richmond, California	United States	For War Shipping Administration.
19 April	U-4713	Type XXIII submarine	Germaniawerft	Kiel	Germany	For Kriegsmarine
20 April	U-3051	Type XXI submarine	AG Weser	Bremen	Germany	For Kriegsmarine
20 April	VIC 95	VIC lighter	Richard Dunston Ltd.	Thorne	United Kingdom	For the Admiralty.
20 April	Western Reserve Victory	Victory ship	Oregon Shipbuilding Corporation	Portland, Oregon	United States	For War Shipping Administration.
20 April	William and Mary Victory	Victory ship	Bethlehem Fairfield Shipyard	Baltimore, Maryland	United States	For War Shipping Administration.
21 April	Park Victory	Victory ship	Permanente Metals Corporation	Richmond, California	United States	For War Shipping Administration.
21 April	Sewell Seam	Liberty ship	Delta Shipbuilding	New Orleans, Louisiana	United States	For War Shipping Administration.
21 April	TID 144	TID-class tug	Richard Dunston Ltd.	Thorne	United Kingdom	For the Admiralty.
22 April	Galveston	Cleveland-class cruiser	William Cramp & Sons	Philadelphia	United States	
23 April	Occidental Victory	Victory ship	California Shipbuilding Corporation	Los Angeles, California	United States	For War Shipping Administration.
24 April	LST 3013	Landing Ship, Tank	Harland & Wolff	Belfast	United Kingdom	For Royal Navy.
24 April	Rushville Victory	Victory ship	Bethlehem Fairfield Shipyard	Baltimore, Maryland	United States	For War Shipping Administration.
24 April	VIC 96	VIC lighter	Richard Dunston Ltd.	Thorne	United Kingdom	For the Admiralty.
24 April	Whitman Victory	Victory ship	Oregon Shipbuilding Corporation	Portland, Oregon	United States	For War Shipping Administration.
25 April	Empire Fawley	Cargo ship	John Readhead & Co Ltd	South Shields	United Kingdom	For Ministry of War Transport
25 April	Empire Maytime	C-type coaster	Ailsa Shipbuilding Co Ltd	Troon	United Kingdom	For Ministry of War Transport.
25 April	Fisk Victory	Victory ship	Permanente Metals Corporation	Richmond, California	United States	For War Shipping Administration.
25 April	LST 3512	Landing Ship, Tank	Davie Shipbuilding & Repairing Co Ltd	Lauzon, Quebec	Canada	For Royal Navy
25 April	Paloma Hills	T2 tanker	Marinship Corporation	Sausalito, California	United States	For United States Maritime Commission.
26 April	Empire Bess	Tug	Clelands (Successors) Ltd	Willington Quay-on-Tyne	United Kingdom	For the Admiralty.
26 April	Empire Dominica	Cargo ship	Short Brothers Ltd	Sunderland	United Kingdom	For Ministry of War Transport
26 April	Moraybank	Cargo ship	William Doxford & Sons Ltd.	Pallion	United Kingdom	For Bank Line Ltd.
26 April	Spirit Lake	T2 Tanker	Alabama Drydock and Shipbuilding Company	Mobile, Alabama	United States	For War Shipping Administration.
26 April	U-4714	Type XXIII submarine	Germaniawerft	Kiel	Germany	For Kriegsmarine
26 April	Wigtown Bay	Bay-class frigate	Harland & Wolff	Belfast	United Kingdom	For Royal Navy.
27 April	Empire Arrow	Intermediate type tanker	J L Thompson & Sons Ltd.	Sunderland	United Kingdom	For Ministry of War Transport.
27 April	Empire Pattern	B-type coaster	Smiths Dock Co Ltd	Middlesbrough	United Kingdom	For Ministry of War Transport.
27 April	LST 3032	Landing Ship, Tank	Charles Connell & Co Ltd	Glasgow	United Kingdom	For Ministry of War Transport.
27 April	Villanova Victory	Victory ship	California Shipbuilding Corporation	Los Angeles, California	United States	For War Shipping Administration.
28 April	Empire Clara	Stella-type tug	Cochrane & Sons Ltd.	Selby	United Kingdom	For Ministry of War Transport.
28 April	Empire Martha	Stella-type tug	Cochrane & Sons Ltd.	Selby	United Kingdom	For Ministry of War Transport.
28 April	Georgetown Victory	Victory ship	Bethlehem Fairfield Shipyard	Baltimore, Maryland	United States	For War Shipping Administration.
28 April	Grove City Victory	Victory ship	Permanente Metals Corporation	Richmond, California	United States	For War Shipping Administration.
28 April	Helena	Baltimore-class cruiser	Bethlehem Steel Company	Quincy, Massachusetts	United States	
28 April	Macalester Victory	Victory ship	Oregon Shipbuilding Corporation	Portland, Oregon	United States	For War Shipping Administration.
28 April	MacMurray Victory	Victory ship	Permanente Metals Corporation	Richmond, California	United States	For War Shipping Administration.
28 April	Pocahontas Seam	Liberty ship	Delta Shipbuilding	New Orleans, Louisiana	United States	For War Shipping Administration.
29 April	Franklin D. Roosevelt	Midway-class aircraft carrier	New York Naval Shipyard	Brooklyn, New York	United States	
30 April	Empire Campden	Coastal tanker	A. & J. Inglis	Glasgow	United Kingdom	For Ministry of War Transport
30 April	Empire Madge	Modified Warrior-type tug	Scott & Sons Ltd.	Bowling	United Kingdom	For Ministry of War Transport.
30 April	Kaposia	T2 Tanker	Alabama Drydock and Shipbuilding Company	Mobile, Alabama	United States	For War Shipping Administration.
30 April	Southwestern Victory	Victory ship	California Shipbuilding Corporation	Los Angeles, California	United States	For War Shipping Administration.
April	Empire Gunfleet	Cargo ship	John Readhead & Sons Ltd.	South Shields	United Kingdom	For Ministry of War Transport.
April	Empire Seaway	Shelt-type coaster	Goole Shipbuilding & Repairing Co Ltd	Goole	United Kingdom	For Ministry of War Transport.
April	Empire Seabreeze	Shelt-type coaster	Henry Scarr Ltd.	Hessle	United Kingdom	For Ministry of War Transport.
April	Empire Seaboy	Shelt-type coaster	Henry Scarr Ltd.	Hessle	United Kingdom	For Ministry of War Transport.
April	LST 3010	Landing Ship, Tank	Harland & Wolff Ltd	Belfast	United Kingdom	For Royal Navy.
April	U-2370	Type XXIII submarine	Deutsche Werft AG	Hamburg	Germany	For Kriegsmarine
2 May	Antioch Victory	Victory ship	Bethlehem Fairfield Shipyard	Baltimore, Maryland	United States	For War Shipping Administration.
2 May	Bates Victory	Victory ship	California Shipbuilding Corporation	Los Angeles, California	United States	For War Shipping Administration.
2 May	Hope Victory	Victory ship	Permanente Metals Corporation	Richmond, California	United States	For War Shipping Administration.
3 May	Coe Victory	Victory ship	Oregon Shipbuilding Corporation	Portland, Oregon	United States	For War Shipping Administration.
3 May	Oliver Westover	Liberty ship	New England Shipbuilding Corporation	South Portland, Maine	United States	For War Shipping Administration.
3 May	Vassar Victory	Victory ship	Bethlehem Fairfield Shipyard	Baltimore, Maryland	United States	For War Shipping Administration.
4 May	Fullarton Hills	T2 tanker	Marinship Corporation	Sausalito, California	United States	For United States Maritime Commission.
4 May	TID 146	TID-class tug	Richard Dunston Ltd.	Thorne	United Kingdom	For Hong Kong Harbour Board.
4 May	TID 150	TID-class tug	Richard Dunston Ltd.	Thorne	United Kingdom	For Ministry of War Transport.
5 May	Kearsarge	Essex-class aircraft carrier	New York Navy Yard	New York City	United States	
5 May	Lafayette Victory	Victory ship	Permanente Metals Corporation	Richmond, California	United States	For War Shipping Administration.
6 May	Toledo	Baltimore-class cruiser	New York Shipbuilding Corporation	Camden, New Jersey	United States	
7 May	Northeastern Victory	Victory ship	Permanente Metals Corporation	Richmond, California	United States	For War Shipping Administration.
7 May	Williams Victory	Victory ship	Bethlehem Fairfield Shipyard	Baltimore, Maryland	United States	For War Shipping Administration.
8 May	James G. Squires	Liberty ship	J. A. Jones Construction Company	Panama City, Florida	United States	For War Shipping Administration.
8 May	Ouachita Victory	Victory ship	California Shipbuilding Corporation	Los Angeles, California	United States	For War Shipping Administration.
8 May	Powellton Seam	Liberty ship	Delta Shipbuilding	New Orleans, Louisiana	United States	For War Shipping Administration.
8 May	Tuskegee Victory	Victory ship	Oregon Shipbuilding Corporation	Portland, Oregon	United States	For War Shipping Administration.
9 May	Marquette Victory	Victory ship	Permanente Metals Corporation	Richmond, California	United States	For War Shipping Administration.
10 May	Empire Aldgate	Empire Malta-class Scandinavian type cargo ship	William Gray & Co. Ltd.	West Hartlepool	United Kingdom	For Ministry of War Transport.
11 May	Empire Eddystone	Cargo ship	William Gray & Co Ltd	West Hartlepool	United Kingdom	For Ministry of War Transport
11 May	Tasso	Cargo ship	Swan, Hunter & Wigham Richardson Ltd.	Newcastle upon Tyne	United Kingdom	For Ellerman's Wilson Line Ltd.
11 May	Turmoil	Bustler-class tug	Henry Robb Ltd.	Leith	United Kingdom	For the Admiralty.
11 May	Union Victory	Victory ship	Oregon Shipbuilding Corporation	Portland, Oregon	United States	For War Shipping Administration.
12 May	Adaptity	Coaster	Goole Shipbuilding & Repairing Co. Ltd.	Goole	United Kingdom	For F. T. Everard & Co. Ltd.
12 May	Belridge Hills	T2 tanker	Marinship Corporation	Sausalito, California	United States	For United States Maritime Commission.
12 May	Hunter Victory	Victory ship	Permanente Metals Corporation	Richmond, California	United States	For War Shipping Administration.
12 May	M. I. T. Victory	Victory ship	Bethlehem Fairfield Shipyard	Baltimore, Maryland	United States	For War Shipping Administration.
12 May	Queens Victory	Victory ship	California Shipbuilding Corporation	Los Angeles, California	United States	For War Shipping Administration.
12 May	Tarawa	Essex-class aircraft carrier	Norfolk Navy Yard	Norfolk, Virginia	United States	
14 May	Empire Clarendon	Refrigerated cargo liner	Harland & Wolff Ltd	Belfast	United Kingdom	For Ministry of War Transport
14 May	Empire Marshal	Heavy lift ship	Greenock Dockyard Co. Ltd.	Greenock	United Kingdom	For Ministry of War Transport.
14 May	Empire Vera	Stella-type tug	Cochrane & Sons Ltd.	Selby	United Kingdom	For Ministry of War Transport.
14 May	Howard Victory	Victory ship	Bethlehem Fairfield Shipyard	Baltimore, Maryland	United States	For War Shipping Administration.
15 May	Chicaca	T2 Tanker	Alabama Drydock and Shipbuilding Company	Mobile, Alabama	United States	For War Shipping Administration.
15 May	Clark Victory	Victory ship	Oregon Shipbuilding Corporation	Portland, Oregon	United States	For War Shipping Administration.
15 May	Empire Pacific	B-type coaster	Burntisland Shipbuilding Co. Ltd.	Burntisland	United Kingdom	For Ministry of War Transport.
15 May	Fenn Victory	Victory ship	Permanente Metals Corporation	Richmond, California	United States	For War Shipping Administration.
15 May	VIC 62	VIC lighter	Isaac Pimblott & Sons Ltd.	Northwich	United Kingdom	For the Admiralty.
16 May	Augustana Victory	Victory ship	Permanente Metals Corporation	Richmond, California	United States	For War Shipping Administration.
16 May	Empire Grassland	Dredger	Fleming & Ferguson Ltd.	Paisley	United Kingdom	For Ministry of War Transport.
16 May	Empire Mayflower	C-type Coaster	Bartram & Sons Ltd	Sunderland	United Kingdom	For Ministry of War Transport.
16 May	Empire Mayrose	C-type coaster	Bartram & Sons Ltd	Sunderland	United Kingdom	For Ministry of War Transport.
16 May	N. Y. U. Victory	Victory ship	Bethlehem Fairfield Shipyard	Baltimore, Maryland	United States	For War Shipping Administration.
17 May	Beckley Seam	Liberty ship	Delta Shipbuilding	New Orleans, Louisiana	United States	For War Shipping Administration.
17 May	James F. Harrell	Liberty ship	J. A. Jones Construction Company	Panama City, Florida	United States	For War Shipping Administration.
17 May	Winthrop Victory	Victory ship	California Shipbuilding Corporation	Los Angeles, California	United States	For War Shipping Administration.
18 May	TID 147	TID-class tug	Richard Dunston Ltd.	Thorne	United Kingdom	For Ministry of War Transport.
19 May	Berry Victory	Victory ship	Permanente Metals Corporation	Richmond, California	United States	For War Shipping Administration.
19 May	Niagara Victory	Victory ship	California Shipbuilding Corporation	Los Angeles, California	United States	For War Shipping Administration.
19 May	Skidmore Victory	Victory ship	Oregon Shipbuilding Corporation	Portland, Oregon	United States	For War Shipping Administration.
21 May	Marshall Victory	Victory ship	Bethlehem Fairfield Shipyard	Baltimore, Maryland	United States	For War Shipping Administration.
22 May	Allen G. Collins	Liberty ship	New England Shipbuilding Corporation	South Portland, Maine	United States	For War Shipping Administration.
22 May	John Robert Gordon	Liberty ship	New England Shipbuilding Corporation	South Portland, Maine	United States	For War Shipping Administration.
22 May	Maritime Victory	Victory ship	Bethlehem Fairfield Shipyard	Baltimore, Maryland	United States	For War Shipping Administration.
22 May	Seton Hall Victory	Victory ship	Oregon Shipbuilding Corporation	Portland, Oregon	United States	For War Shipping Administration.
23 May	Ackia	T2 Tanker	Alabama Drydock and Shipbuilding Company	Mobile, Alabama	United States	For War Shipping Administration.
23 May	Drake Victory	Victory ship	Permanente Metals Corporation	Richmond, California	United States	For War Shipping Administration.
24 May	American Victory	Victory ship	California Shipbuilding Corporation	Los Angeles, California	United States	For War Shipping Administration.
24 May	Claude Kitchin	Liberty ship	J. A. Jones Construction Company	Panama City, Florida	United States	For War Shipping Administration.
24 May	Coyote Hills	T2 tanker	Marinship Corporation	Sausalito, California	United States	For United States Maritime Commission.
24 May	Hartington	Cargo ship	William Doxford & Sons Ltd.	Pallion	United Kingdom	For National Steamship Co. Ltd.
24 May	Smith Victory	Victory ship	Bethlehem Fairfield Shipyard	Baltimore, Maryland	United States	For War Shipping Administration.
24 May	Moorwood	C-type coaster	S. P. Austin & Sons Ltd.	Sunderland	United Kingdom	For France, Fenwick & Co. Ltd.
25 May	Highland Queen	Coaster	Ardrossan Dockyard Ltd.	Ardrossan	United Kingdom	For British Channel Islands Shipping Co. Ltd.
25 May	Hobart Victory	Victory ship	Permanente Metals Corporation	Richmond, California	United States	For War Shipping Administration.
25 May	Rhexenor	Cargo ship	Caledon Shipbuilding & Engineering Co. Ltd.	Dundee	United Kingdom	For China Mutual Steam Navigation Co. Ltd.
26 May	Empire Bromley	Tudor Queen type coaster	G. Brown & Co. (Marine) Ltd.	Greenock	United Kingdom	For Ministry of War Transport.
26 May	Phillips Victory	Victory ship	Permanente Metals Corporation	Richmond, California	United States	For War Shipping Administration.
28 May	Empire Mombasa	Cargo ship	Shipbuilding Corporation Ltd.	Sunderland	United Kingdom	For Ministry of War Transport.
28 May	Empire Tobago	Cargo ship	Bartram & Sons Ltd	Sunderland	United Kingdom	For Ministry of War Transport.
28 May	Walrus	Aircraft transport ship	Blyth Dry Docks & Shipbuilding Co. Ltd	Blyth, Northumberland	United Kingdom	For Royal Navy.
28 May	Wayne Victory	Victory ship	California Shipbuilding Corporation	Los Angeles, California	United States	For War Shipping Administration.
29 May	Oglethorpe Victory	Victory ship	Oregon Shipbuilding Corporation	Portland, Oregon	United States	For War Shipping Administration.
29 May	Stevens Victory	Victory ship	Bethlehem Fairfield Shipyard	Baltimore, Maryland	United States	For War Shipping Administration.
30 May	Boonesborough	T2 Tanker	Alabama Drydock and Shipbuilding Company	Mobile, Alabama	United States	For War Shipping Administration.
30 May	Elysia	Cargo ship	Lithgows Ltd.	Port Glasgow	United Kingdom	For Anchor Line Ltd.
30 May	New World Victory	Victory ship	Permanente Metals Corporation	Richmond, California	United States	For War Shipping Administration.
31 May	Empire Maytree	C-type Coaster	Ailsa Shipbuilding Co Ltd	Troon	United Kingdom	For Ministry of War Transport.
31 May	Kings Point Victory	Victory ship	Bethlehem Fairfield Shipyard	Baltimore, Maryland	United States	For War Shipping Administration.
31 May	Lane Victory	Victory ship	California Shipbuilding Corporation	Los Angeles, California	United States	For War Shipping Administration.
May	Empire Maymead	C-type coaster	H Scarr Ltd	Hessle	United Kingdom	For Ministry of War Transportf.
May	Empire Mayport	C-type Coaster	Cook, Welton & Gemmell Ltd	Beverley	United Kingdom	For Ministry of War Transport.
May	Empire Peggy	Modified Warrior-type tug	Cook, Welton & Gemmell Ltd.	Beverley	United Kingdom	For the Admiralty.
May	Empire Seagull	Shelt-type coaster	Henry Scarr Ltd.	Hessle	United Kingdom	For Ministry of War Transport.
May	LST 3514	Landing Ship, Tank	Canadian Vickers Ltd.	Montreal	Canada	For Royal Navy.
May	TID 148	TID-class tug	Richard Dunston Ltd.	Thorne	United Kingdom	For Hong Kong Harbour Board.
May	TID 149	TID-class tug	Richard Dunston Ltd.	Thorne	United Kingdom	For the Admiralty.
May	TID 151	TID-class tug	Richard Dunston Ltd.	Thorne	United Kingdom	For Hong Kong Harbour Board.
2 June	Adelphi Victory	Victory ship	Permanente Metals Corporation	Richmond, California	United States	For War Shipping Administration.
2 June	Eagle Seam	Liberty ship	Delta Shipbuilding	New Orleans, Louisiana	United States	For War Shipping Administration.
2 June	Gonzaga Victory	Victory ship	Oregon Shipbuilding Corporation	Portland, Oregon	United States	For War Shipping Administration.
2 June	Goucher Victory	Victory ship	Bethlehem Fairfield Shipyard	Baltimore, Maryland	United States	For War Shipping Administration.
5 June	Kenyon Victory	Victory ship	California Shipbuilding Corporation	Los Angeles, California	United States	For War Shipping Administration.
6 June	Catawba Victory	Victory ship	Permanente Metals Corporation	Richmond, California	United States	For War Shipping Administration.
6 June	Drury Victory	Victory ship	Permanente Metals Corporation	Richmond, California	United States	For War Shipping Administration.
7 June	Leviathan	Majestic-class aircraft carrier	Swan Hunter	Wallsend, Tyne and Wear	United Kingdom	Scrapped before completion
7 June	Empire Seasilver	Coaster	Shipbuilding Corporation	Newcastle upon Tyne	United Kingdom	For Ministry of War Transport
7 June	Linfield Victory	Victory ship	Oregon Shipbuilding Corporation	Portland, Oregon	United States	For War Shipping Administration.
8 June	Francis J. O'Gara	Liberty ship	J. A. Jones Construction Company	Panama City, Florida	United States	For War Shipping Administration.
8 June	Harold H. Brown	Liberty ship	New England Shipbuilding Corporation	South Portland, Maine	United States	For War Shipping Administration.
8 June	Sacramento	Cargo ship	Cammell Laird & Co. Ltd.	Birkenhead	United Kingdom	For Ellerma's Wilson Line Ltd.
8 June	Stanley R. Fisher	Liberty ship	New England Shipbuilding Corporation	South Portland, Maine	United States	For War Shipping Administration.
8 June	Tapti	Cargo ship	Charles Connell & Co Ltd	Glasgow	United Kingdom	For J. Nourse Ltd.
9 June	Allegheny Victory	Victory ship	Permanente Metals Corporation	Richmond, California	United States	For War Shipping Administration.
9 June	Hood Victory	Victory ship	Bethlehem Fairfield Shipyard	Baltimore, Maryland	United States	For War Shipping Administration.
9 June	Oregon City	Oregon City-class cruiser	Bethlehem Steel	Quincy, Massachusetts	United States	First in class
9 June	VIC 102	Improved VIC lighter	Richards Ironworks Ltd.	Lowestoft	United Kingdom	For the Admiralty.
9 June	Wabash Victory	Victory ship	California Shipbuilding Corporation	Los Angeles, California	United States	For War Shipping Administration.
11 June	Empire Pampas	B-type coaster	Smiths Dock Co Ltd	Middlesbrough	United Kingdom	For Ministry of War Transport.
11 June	Empire Richmond	Tudor Queen type coaster	John Lewis & Sons Ltd.	Aberdeen	United Kingdom	For .
11 June	Empire Seafarer	Shelt-type coaster	Goole Shipbuilding & Repairing Co Ltd	Goole	United Kingdom	For Ministry of War Transport.
11 June	Empire Southwark	Empire Malta-class Scandinavian type cargo ship	William Gray & Co. Ltd.	West Hartlepool	United Kingdom	For Ministry of War Transport.
11 June	Huntington Hills	T2 tanker	Marinship Corporation	Sausalito, California	United States	For United States Maritime Commission.
11 June	Southern Venturer	Whaling factory tanker	Furness Shipbuilding Co. Ltd.	Haverton Hill-on-Tees	United Kingdom	For Sevilla Whaling Co. Ltd.
11 June	Tusculum Victory	Victory ship	Bethlehem Fairfield Shipyard	Baltimore, Maryland	United States	For War Shipping Administration.
12 June	Banner Seam	Liberty ship	Delta Shipbuilding	New Orleans, Louisiana	United States	For War Shipping Administration.
12 June	Council Grove	T2 Tanker	Alabama Drydock and Shipbuilding Company	Mobile, Alabama	United States	For War Shipping Administration.
12 June	Empire Fitzroy	Tanker	Harland & Wolff	Govan	United Kingdom	For Ministry of War Transport.
12 June	Empire Greta	Stella-type tug	Cochrane & Sons Ltd.	Selby	United Kingdom	For Ministry of War Transport.
12 June	Empire Jewel	Empire Pym type tanker	Grangemouth Dockyard Co. Ltd.	Grangemouth	United Kingdom	For Ministry of War Transport.
12 June	Empire Nina	Stella-type tug	Cochrane & Sons Ltd.	Selby	United Kingdom	For Ministry of War Transport.
13 June	Midland Victory	Victory ship	Oregon Shipbuilding Corporation	Portland, Oregon	United States	For War Shipping Administration.
13 June	Earlham Victory	Victory ship	Permanente Metals Corporation	Richmond, California	United States	For War Shipping Administration.
13 June	Sheepshead Bay Victory	Victory ship	Bethlehem Fairfield Shipyard	Baltimore, Maryland	United States	For War Shipping Administration.
14 June	Rabaul	Commencement Bay-class escort carrier	Todd Pacific Shipyards	Tacoma, Washington	United States	
15 June	Hamilton Victory	Victory ship	Permanente Metals Corporation	Richmond, California	United States	For War Shipping Administration.
16 June	Asbury Victory	Victory ship	Permanente Metals Corporation	Richmond, California	United States	For War Shipping Administration.
16 June	Chilton Seam	Liberty ship	Delta Shipbuilding	New Orleans, Louisiana	United States	For War Shipping Administration.
16 June	Empire Anglesey	Isles-class coastal tanker	J. Harker Ltd.	Knottingley	United Kingdom	For Ministry or War Transport.
16 June	Rice Victory	Victory ship	California Shipbuilding Corporation	Los Angeles, California	United States	For War Shipping Administration.
16 June	Stetson Victory	Victory ship	Bethlehem Fairfield Shipyard	Baltimore, Maryland	United States	For War Shipping Administration.
17 June	Cubera	Balao-class submarine	Electric Boat Corporation	Groton, Connecticut	United States	
17 June	Drew Victory	Victory ship	Oregon Shipbuilding Corporation	Portland, Oregon	United States	For War Shipping Administration.
20 June	Canton Victory	Victory ship	Permanente Metals Corporation	Richmond, California	United States	For War Shipping Administration.
20 June	Haverford Victory	Victory ship	Bethlehem Fairfield Shipyard	Baltimore, Maryland	United States	For War Shipping Administration.
20 June	Whittier Victory	Victory ship	California Shipbuilding Corporation	Los Angeles, California	United States	For War Shipping Administration.
21 June	Alma Victory	Victory ship	Oregon Shipbuilding Corporation	Portland, Oregon	United States	For War Shipping Administration.
21 June	Gold Creek	T2 Tanker	Alabama Drydock and Shipbuilding Company	Mobile, Alabama	United States	For War Shipping Administration.
22 June	Frank Flowers	Liberty ship	J. A. Jones Construction Company	Panama City, Florida	United States	For War Shipping Administration.
22 June	Palikonda	Cargo ship	John Readhead & Sons Ltd.	South Shields	United Kingdom	For British India Steam Navigation Co. Ltd.
23 June	C. C. N. Y. Victory	Victory ship	Bethlehem Fairfield Shipyard	Baltimore, Maryland	United States	For War Shipping Administration.
23 June	Hillsdale Victory	Victory ship	Permanente Metals Corporation	Richmond, California	United States	For War Shipping Administration.
23 June	Lindenwood Victory	Victory ship	Permanente Metals Corporation	Richmond, California	United States	For War Shipping Administration.
23 June	LST 3534	Landing Ship, Tank	Yarrows Ltd	Esquimalt, British Columbia	Canada	For Royal Navy
23 June	Meredith Victory	Victory ship	California Shipbuilding Corporation	Los Angeles, California	United States	For War Shipping Administration.
26 June	Empire Highlander	Collier	John Crown & Sons Ltd.	Sunderland	United Kingdom	For Ministry of War Transport.
26 June	Empire Seabird	Shelt-type coaster	Henry Scarr Ltd.	Hessle	United Kingdom	For Ministry of War Transport.
26 June	Midedlesex Victory	Victory ship	Oregon Shipbuilding Corporation	Portland, Oregon	United States	For War Shipping Administration.
26 June	Webster Victory	Victory ship	Bethlehem Fairfield Shipyard	Baltimore, Maryland	United States	For War Shipping Administration.
27 June	Empire Honduras	Cargo ship	Short Brothers Ltd.	Sunderland	United Kingdom	For Ministry of War Transport.
27 June	Empire Senlac	Intermediate type tanker	J. L. Thompson & Sons Ltd.	Sunderland	United Kingdom	For Ministry of War Transport.
27 June	Empire Shirley	Near-Warrior type tug	A Hall & Co Ltd	Aberdeen	United Kingdom	For Ministry of War Transport.
27 June	Enid Victory	Victory ship	Permanente Metals Corporation	Richmond, California	United States	For War Shipping Administration.
27 June	Mindoro	Commencement Bay-class escort carrier	Todd Pacific Shipyards	Tacoma, Washington	United States	
28 June	Cohocton	T2 tanker	Marinship Corporation	Sausalito, California	United States	For United States Maritime Commission.
28 June	Empire Cross	Intermediate type tanker	Sir J. Laing & Sons Ltd.	Sunderland	United Kingdom	For Ministry of War Transport.
28 June	Imboden Seam	Liberty ship	Delta Shipbuilding	New Orleans, Louisiana	United States	For War Shipping Administration.
28 June	Pacific Victory	Victory ship	California Shipbuilding Corporation	Los Angeles, California	United States	For War Shipping Administration.
28 June	Patella	Tanker	Harland & Wolff	Belfast	United Kingdom	For Anglo-Saxon Petroleum Company.
29 June	Edwin H. Duff	Liberty ship	J. A. Jones Construction Company	Panama City, Florida	United States	For War Shipping Administration.
29 June	Streator Seam	Liberty ship	Delta Shipbuilding	New Orleans, Louisiana	United States	For War Shipping Administration.
30 June	Albany	Oregon City-class cruiser	Bethlehem Steel Company	Quincy, Massachusetts	United States	
30 June	Dobeytown	T2 Tanker	Alabama Drydock and Shipbuilding Company	Mobile, Alabama	United States	For War Shipping Administration.
30 June	San Mateo Victory	Victory ship	Permanente Metals Corporation	Richmond, California	United States	For War Shipping Administration.
30 June	South Bend Victory	Victory ship	Oregon Shipbuilding Corporation	Portland, Oregon	United States	For War Shipping Administration.
June	Contocook	T2 tanker	Marinship Corporation	Sausalito, California	United States	For United States Maritime Commission.
June	Empire Palace	B-type coaster	William Hamilton & Co. Ltd.	Port Glasgow	United Kingdom	For Ministry of War Transport.
June	Empire Seacoast	Shelt-type coaster	Henry Scarr Ltd.	Hessle	United Kingdom	For Ministry of War Transport.
June	LST 3026	Landing Ship, Tank	Blyth Dry Dock & Shipbuilding Co. Ltd.	Blyth	United Kingdom	For Royal Navy.
June	LST 3041	Landing Ship, Tank	Harland & Wolff Ltd	Govan	United Kingdom	For Royal Navy.
June	LST 3507	Landing Ship, Tank	Davie Shipbuilding & Repairing Co. Ltd.	Lauzon	United Kingdom	For Royal Navy.
June	Warden	Bustler-class tug	Henry Robb Ltd.	Leith	United Kingdom	For the Admiralty.
1 July	Amarillo Victory	Victory ship	California Shipbuilding Corporation	Los Angeles, California	United States	For War Shipping Administration.
2 July	Rollins Victory	Victory ship	Bethlehem Fairfield Shipyard	Baltimore, Maryland	United States	For War Shipping Administration.
3 July	Ripon Victory	Victory ship	Permanente Metals Corporation	Richmond, California	United States	For War Shipping Administration.
4 July	Greeley Victory	Victory ship	Permanente Metals Corporation	Richmond, California	United States	For War Shipping Administration.
5 July	Coffeeville Victory	Victory ship	Oregon Shipbuilding Corporation	Portland, Oregon	United States	For War Shipping Administration.
6 July	Empire Mammoth	Bucket dredger	Fleming & Ferguson Ltd.	Paisley	United Kingdom	For Ministry of War Transport.
6 July	Wilson Victory	Victory ship	Bethlehem Fairfield Shipyard	Baltimore, Maryland	United States	For War Shipping Administration.
7 July	Berwyn Victory	Victory ship	Permanente Metals Corporation	Richmond, California	United States	For War Shipping Administration.
7 July	Pine Bluff Victory	Victory ship	California Shipbuilding Corporation	Los Angeles, California	United States	For War Shipping Administration.
8 July	Princeton	Essex-class aircraft carrier	Philadelphia Navy Yard	Philadelphia	United States	
8 July	Saipan	Saipan-class aircraft carrier	New York Shipbuilding Corporation	Camden, New Jersey	United States	Converted cruiser hull; first in class
9 July	Joseph V. Connolly	Liberty ship	J. A. Jones Construction Company	Panama City, Florida	United States	For War Shipping Administration.
9 July	LST 3523	Landing Ship, Tank	Davie Shipbuilding & Repairing Co Ltd	Lauzon, Quebec	Canada	
9 July	Empire Tilbury	Cargo ship	William Doxford & Sons Ltd.	Pallion	United Kingdom	For Ministry of War Transport.
9 July	Gustavus Victory	Victory ship	Bethlehem Fairfield Shipyard	Baltimore, Maryland	United States	For War Shipping Administration.
9 July	Southern Strife	Whaler	Smith's Dock Co. Ltd.	Middlesbrough	United Kingdom	For South Georgia Co. Ltd.
9 July	Southern Truce	Whaler	Smith's Dock Co. Ltd.	Middlesbrough	United Kingdom	For South Georgia Co. Ltd.
10 July	Alert	Bay-class frigate	Blyth Dry Docks & Shipbuilding Co. Ltd	Blyth, Northumberland	United Kingdom	For Royal Navy.
10 July	Bruas	Icemaid type collier	Grangemouth Dockyard Co. Ltd.	Grangemouth	United Kingdom	For Sarawak Steamship Co.
10 July	Empire Calshot	Cargo ship	Burntisland Shipbuilding Co Ltd	Burntisland	United Kingdom	For Ministry of War Transport
10 July	Empire Connie	Near-Warrior type tug	A Hall & Co Ltd	Aberdeen	United Kingdom	For Ministry of War Transport.
10 July	Empire Dunnet	Cargo ship	William Gray & Co Ltd	West Hartlepool	United Kingdom	For Ministry of War Transport
10 July	Empire Maybury	C-type Coaster	Cook, Welton & Gemmell Ltd	Beverley	United Kingdom	For Ministry of War Transport.
10 July	Empire Trinidad	Ocean type tanker	Blythwood Shipbuilding Co. Ltd.	Glasgow	United Kingdom	For Ministry of War Transport.
10 July	J. Howland Gardner	Liberty ship	New England Shipbuilding Corporation	South Portland, Maine	United States	For War Shipping Administration.
10 July	Norwalk Victory	Victory ship	Oregon Shipbuilding Corporation	Portland, Oregon	United States	For War Shipping Administration.
10 July	Robert W. Hart	Liberty ship	New England Shipbuilding Corporation	South Portland, Maine	United States	For War Shipping Administration.
11 July	Battle Creek Victory	Victory ship	Permanente Metals Corporation	Richmond, California	United States	For War Shipping Administration.
11 July	Eminence	Coaster	John Lewis & Sons Ltd.	Aberdeen	United Kingdom	For London & Rochester Trading Co. Ltd.
11 July	Empire Helen	Near-Warrior type tug	Cochrane & Sons Ltd.	Selby	United Kingdom	For Ministry of War Transport.
11 July	Empire Simon	Near-Warrior type tug	Cochrane & Sons Ltd.	Selby	United Kingdom	For Ministry of War Transport. Completed as Simonia of Overseas Towage & Salvage Co. Ltd.
11 July	Pittsburgh Seam	Liberty ship	Delta Shipbuilding	New Orleans, Louisiana	United States	For War Shipping Administration.
12 July	Muhlenburg Victory	Victory ship	Bethlehem Fairfield Shipyard	Baltimore, Maryland	United States	For War Shipping Administration.
13 July	Tucson Victory	Victory ship	California Shipbuilding Corporation	Los Angeles, California	United States	For War Shipping Administration.
13 July	Wagon Mound	T2 Tanker	Alabama Drydock and Shipbuilding Company	Mobile, Alabama	United States	For War Shipping Administration.
14 July	Carthage Victory	Victory ship	Permanente Metals Corporation	Richmond, California	United States	For War Shipping Administration.
14 July	Great Falls Victory	Victory ship	Permanente Metals Corporation	Richmond, California	United States	For War Shipping Administration.
14 July	Hampden-Sydney Victory	Victory ship	Bethlehem Fairfield Shipyard	Baltimore, Maryland	United States	For War Shipping Administration.
14 July	Rabaul	Commencement Bay-class escort carrier	Todd Pacific Shipyards	Tacoma, Washington	United States	
14 July	Wheeler Hills	T2 tanker	Marinship Corporation	Sausalito, California	United States	For United States Maritime Commission.
15 July	Juneau	Atlanta-class cruiser	Federal Shipbuilding and Drydock Company	Kearny, New Jersey	United States	
15 July	U-3535	Type XXI submarine	Schichau-Werke	Danzig	Soviet Union	For Soviet Navy
15 July	U-3536	Type XXI submarine	Schichau-Werke	Danzig	Soviet Union	For Soviet Navy
15 July	U-3537	Type XXI submarine	Schichau-Werke	Danzig	Soviet Union	For Soviet Navy
15 July	U-3538	Type XXI submarine	Schichau-Werke	Danzig	Soviet Union	For Soviet Navy
16 July	Empire Northfleet	Cargo ship	William Doxford & Sons Ltd.	Pallion	United Kingdom	For Ministry of War Transport.
17 July	Empire Nickleby	Empire Lad-class coastal tanker	Isaac Pimblott & Sons Ltd.	Northwich	United Kingdom	For Ministry of War Transport.
17 July	Mingo Seam	Liberty ship	Delta Shipbuilding	New Orleans, Louisiana	United States	For War Shipping Administration.
17 July	Roswell Victory	Victory ship	California Shipbuilding Corporation	Los Angeles, California	United States	For War Shipping Administration.
18 July	Lakeland Victory	Victory ship	Permanente Metals Corporation	Richmond, California	United States	For War Shipping Administration.
19 July	Chelsea Victory	Victory ship	Oregon Shipbuilding Corporation	Portland, Oregon	United States	For War Shipping Administration.
19 July	Newberry Victory	Victory ship	Permanente Metals Corporation	Richmond, California	United States	For War Shipping Administration.
20 July	Waycross Victory	Victory ship	Bethlehem Fairfield Shipyard	Baltimore, Maryland	United States	For War Shipping Administration.
21 July	Bloomington Victory	Victory ship	California Shipbuilding Corporation	Los Angeles, California	United States	For War Shipping Administration.
21 July	Owensboro Victory	Victory ship	Permanente Metals Corporation	Richmond, California	United States	For War Shipping Administration.
21 July	Walter W. Schwenk	Liberty ship	J. A. Jones Construction Company	Panama City, Florida	United States	For War Shipping Administration.
24 July	Altoona Victory	Victory ship	Bethlehem Fairfield Shipyard	Baltimore, Maryland	United States	For War Shipping Administration.
24 July	Phantom Hill	T2 Tanker	Alabama Drydock and Shipbuilding Company	Mobile, Alabama	United States	For War Shipping Administration.
25 July	Actaeon	Modified Black Swan-class sloop			United Kingdom	
25 July	LST 3524	Landing Ship, Tank	Davie Shipbuilding & Repairing Co Ltd	Lauzon, Quebec	Canada	For Royal Navy
25 July	Waltham Victory	Victory ship	Permanente Metals Corporation	Richmond, California	United States	For War Shipping Administration.
26 July	Bessemer Victory	Victory ship	California Shipbuilding Corporation	Los Angeles, California	United States	For War Shipping Administration.
26 July	British Supremacy	Tanker	Harland & Wolff Ltd.	Belfast	United Kingdom	For British Tanker Co. Ltd.
26 July	Norhaval	Tanker	Furness Shipbuilding Co. Ltd.	Haverton Hill-on-Tees	United Kingdom	For Hvalfangerisk Polaris A/S.
26 July	Waterbury Victory	Victory ship	Bethlehem Fairfield Shipyard	Baltimore, Maryland	United States	For War Shipping Administration.
27 July	Empire Herald	Wave-class oiler	Sir J. Laing & Sons Ltd.	Sunderland	United Kingdom	For Ministry of War Transport. Completed as RFA Wave Prince for Royal Fleet Auxiliary.
28 July	Binghampton Victory	Victory ship	Oregon Shipbuilding Corporation	Portland, Oregon	United States	For War Shipping Administration.
28 July	Burbank Victory	Victory ship	Permanente Metals Corporation	Richmond, California	United States	For War Shipping Administration.
28 July	Empire Seablue	Coaster	Clelands (Successors) Ltd	Wallsend	United Kingdom	For Ministry of War Transport
28 July	Empire Seagreen	Coaster	Clelands (Successors) Ltd	Wallsend	United Kingdom	For Ministry of War Transport
30 July	Freeport Seam	Liberty ship	Delta Shipbuilding	New Orleans, Louisiana	United States	For War Shipping Administration.
31 July	Barre Victory	Victory ship	Bethlehem Fairfield Shipyard	Baltimore, Maryland	United States	For War Shipping Administration.
31 July	Empire Tesland	TES-type coastal tanker	Harland & Wolff	Govan	United Kingdom	For Ministry of War Transport.
31 July	Lorenzo C. McCarthy	Liberty ship	New England Shipbuilding Corporation	South Portland, Maine	United States	For War Shipping Administration.
31 July	Ratonn Pass	T2 Tanker	Alabama Drydock and Shipbuilding Company	Mobile, Alabama	United States	For War Shipping Administration.
31 July	Samuel R. Aitken	Liberty ship	New England Shipbuilding Corporation	South Portland, Maine	United States	For War Shipping Administration.
July	Concho	T2 tanker	Marinship Corporation	Sausalito, California	United States	For United States Maritime Commission.
July	Conecuh	T2 tanker	Marinship Corporation	Sausalito, California	United States	For United States Maritime Commission.
July	Empire Sealion	Shelt-type coaster	Henry Scarr Ltd.	Hessle	United Kingdom	For Ministry of War Transport.
July	LST 3038	Landing Ship, Tank	Fairfield Ltd.	Govan	United Kingdom	For Royal Navy.
July	LST 3520	Landing Ship, Tank	Canadian Vickers Ltd.	Montreal	Canada	For Royal Navy.
1 August	Empire Dorothy	Modified Warrior-type tug	Cook, Welton & Gemmell Ltd.	Beverley	United Kingdom	For Ministry of War Transport.
2 August	Jackson Victory	Victory ship	Oregon Shipbuilding Corporation	Portland, Oregon	United States	For War Shipping Administration.
3 August	North Platte Victory	Victory ship	California Shipbuilding Corporation	Los Angeles, California	United States	For War Shipping Administration.
6 August	Arnold J. Isbell	Gearing-class destroyer	Bethlehem Steel	Staten Island	United States	
6 August	Empire Goodwin	Cargo ship	William Hamilton & Co. Ltd.	Port Glasgow	United Kingdom	For the Ministry of War Transport.
6 August	Nashua Victory	Victory ship	Bethlehem Fairfield Shipyard	Baltimore, Maryland	United States	For War Shipping Administration.
6 August	Palau	Commencement Bay-class escort carrier	Todd Pacific Shipyards	Tacoma, Washington	United States	
6 August	Spartanburg Victory	Victory ship	Bethlehem Fairfield Shipyard	Baltimore, Maryland	United States	For War Shipping Administration.
9 August	Empire Pavilion	B-type coaster	Blyth Dry Docks & Shipbuilding Co. Ltd.	Blyth	United Kingdom	For Ministry of War Transport.
9 August	Oshkosh Victory	Victory ship	California Shipbuilding Corporation	Los Angeles, California	United States	For War Shipping Administration.
9 August	TID 153	TID-class tug	William Pickersgill & Sons Ltd.	Sunderland	United Kingdom	For Ministry of War Transport.
9 August	TID 161	TID-class tug	William Pickersgill & Sons Ltd.	Sunderland	United Kingdom	For French Government.
11 August	Dothan Victory	Victory ship	Oregon Shipbuilding Corporation	Portland, Oregon	United States	For War Shipping Administration.
13 August	Charles H. Cugle	Liberty ship	J. A. Jones Construction Company	Panama City, Florida	United States	For War Shipping Administration.
14 August	Empire Grosvenor	Coastal tanker	A & J Inglis Ltd.	Glasgow	United Kingdom	For Ministry of War Transport.
14 August	Hattiesburg Victory	Victory ship	California Shipbuilding Corporation	Los Angeles, California	United States	For War Shipping Administration.
14 AugustEngihneering	Jellico Seam	Liberty ship	Delta Shipbuilding	New Orleans, Louisiana	United States	For War Shipping Administration.
15 August	Empire Nora	Modified Stella-type tug	William Simons & Co. Ltd.	Renfrew	United Kingdom	For Ministry of War Transport.
15 August	Lynn Victory	Victory ship	Bethlehem Fairfield Shipyard	Baltimore, Maryland	United States	For War Shipping Administration.
18 August	Bellingham Victory	Victory ship	Oregon Shipbuilding Corporation	Portland, Oregon	United States	For War Shipping Administration.
21 August	Pilcomayo	Cargo ship	Harland & Wolff	Belfast	United Kingdom	For Royal Mail Line.
22 August	Baton Rouge Victory	Victory ship	Bethlehem Fairfield Shipyard	Baltimore, Maryland	United States	For War Shipping Administration.
22 August	Empire Favour	Cargo ship	Caledon Shipbuilding & Engineering Co. Ltd.	Dundee	United Kingdom	For Ministry of War Transport.
23 August	Biddeford Victory	Victory ship	Bethlehem Fairfield Shipyard	Baltimore, Maryland	United States	For War Shipping Administration.
23 August	Leyte	Essex-class aircraft carrier	Newport News Shipbuilding	Newport News, Virginia	United States	
23 August	Port Lincoln	Cargo ship	Swan, Hunter & Wigham Richardson Ltd.	Wallsend	United Kingdom	For Port Line Ltd.
23 August	Thorarinn	Whaler	Smith's Dock Co. Ltd.	Middlesbrough	United Kingdom	For Bryde & Dahls Hvalf. A/S.
23 August	Thordr	Whaler	Smith's Dock Co. Ltd.	Middlesbrough	United Kingdom	For Bryde & Dahls Hvalf. A/S.
24 August	Empire Pam	Modified Warrior-type tug	Cook, Welton & Gemmell Ltd.	Beverley	United Kingdom	For Ministry of War Transport.
24 August	Foochow	Cargo ship	William Gray & Co. Ltd.	West Hartlepool	United Kingdom	For China Navigation Co. Ltd.
24 August	Pemba	Cargo ship	Bartram & Sons Ltd	Sunderland	United Kingdom	For British India Steam Navigation Company.
24 August	Trinidad Victory	Victory ship	California Shipbuilding Corporation	Los Angeles, California	United States	For War Shipping Administration.
25 August	Cattaro	Cargo ship	William Gray & Co. Ltd.	West Hartlepool	United Kingdom	For Ellerman's Wilson Line Co. Ltd.
25 August	Fruitville Hills	T2 tanker	Marinship Corporation	Sausalito, California	United States	For United States Maritime Commission.
25 August	Roda Seam	Liberty ship	Delta Shipbuilding	New Orleans, Louisiana	United States	For War Shipping Administration.
27 August	Beaverdell	Cargo ship	Lithgows Ltd.	Port Glasgow	United Kingdom	For Canadian Pacific Steamships Ltd.
27 August	Bronx	Haskell-class attack transport	Oregon Shipbuilding Corporation	Portland, Oregon	United States	For United States Navy.
27 August	Empire Gala	Cargo liner	J. L. Thompson & Sons Ltd.	Sunderland	United Kingdom	For Ministry of War Transport. Completed as Bir Hakrim for the Government of French Indo-China.
27 August	Empire Seaworthy	Shelt-type coaster	Goole Shipbuilding & Repairing Co Ltd	Goole	United Kingdom	For Ministry of War Transport.
28 August	Archer's Hope	T2 Tanker	Alabama Drydock and Shipbuilding Company	Mobile, Alabama	United States	For War Shipping Administration.
28 August	Bowling Green Victory	Victory ship	California Shipbuilding Corporation	Los Angeles, California	United States	For War Shipping Administration.
28 August	Robert F. Burns	Liberty ship	J. A. Jones Construction Company	Panama City, Florida	United States	For War Shipping Administration.
28 August	Rochester	Oregon City-class cruiser	Bethlehem Steel Company	Quincy, Massachusetts	United States	
28 August	TID 155	TID-class tug	William Pickersgill & Sons Ltd.	Sunderland	United Kingdom	For the Admiralty.
28 August	TID 162	TID-class tug	William Pickersgill & Sons Ltd.	Sunderland	United Kingdom	For French Government.
29 August	Mankanto Victory	Victory ship	Oregon Shipbuilding Corporation	Portland, Oregon	United States	For War Shipping Administration.
29 August	Ninety-Six	T2 Tanker	Alabama Drydock and Shipbuilding Company	Mobile, Alabama	United States	For War Shipping Administration.
31 August	Cardinal O'Connell	Liberty ship	New England Shipbuilding Corporation	South Portland, Maine	United States	For War Shipping Administration.
31 August	Tom Treanor	Liberty ship	New England Shipbuilding Corporation	South Portland, Maine	United States	For War Shipping Administration.
August	Empire Mayland	C-type coaster	Charles Hill & Sons Ltd	Bristol	United Kingdom	For Ministry of War Transport.
August	Empire Mayring	C-type Coaster	Cochrane & Sons Ltd	Selby	United Kingdom	For Ministry of War Transport.
August	Empire Maytown	C-type Coaster	H Scarr Ltd	Hessle	United Kingdom	For Ministry of War Transport.
August	Empire Seaport	Shelt-type coaster	Henry Scarr Ltd.	Hessle	United Kingdom	For Ministry of War Transport.
August	Empire Seaview	Shelt-type coaster	Henry Scarr Ltd.	Hessle	United Kingdom	For Ministry of War Transport.
August	TID 152	TID-class tug	William Pickersgill & Sons Ltd.	Sunderland	United Kingdom	For Ministry of War Transport.
August	TID 154	TID-class tug	William Pickersgill & Sons Ltd.	Sunderland	United Kingdom	For Ministry of War Transport.
August	TID 164	TID-class tug	William Pickersgill & Sons Ltd.	Sunderland	United Kingdom	For the Admiralty.
August	VIC 97	VIC lighter	J. S. Watson (Gainsborough) Ltd.	Gainsborough	United Kingdom	For the Admiralty.
1 September	Petersburg Victory	Victory ship	California Shipbuilding Corporation	Los Angeles, California	United States	For War Shipping Administration.
1 September	Wright	Saipan-class aircraft carrier	New York Shipbuilding Corporation	Camden, New Jersey	United States	Converted cruiser hull
1 September	VIC 63	VIC lighter	Isaac Pimblott & Sons Ltd.	Northwich	United Kingdom	For the Admiralty.
4 September	Empire Wallace	Heavy lift ship	Greenock Dockyard Co. Ltd.	Greenock	United Kingdom	For Ministry of Transport.
5 September	Bidor	Icemaid type collier	Grangemouth Dockyard Co. Ltd.	Grangemouth	United Kingdom	For Singapore Straits Steamship Co. Ltd.
5 September	New Rochelle Victory	Victory ship	Bethlehem Fairfield Shipyard	Baltimore, Maryland	United States	For War Shipping Administration.
5 September	Philippine Sea	Essex-class aircraft carrier	Bethlehem Shipbuilding	Quincy, Massachusetts	United States	
5 September	Tinian	Commencement Bay-class escort carrier	Todd Pacific Shipyards	Tacoma, Washington	United States	Never commissioned; United States Navy reserve until stricken in 1970
6 September	High Point Victory	Victory ship	Bethlehem Fairfield Shipyard	Baltimore, Maryland	United States	For War Shipping Administration.
6 September	Mesa Victory	Victory ship	California Shipbuilding Corporation	Los Angeles, California	United States	For War Shipping Administration.
6 September	Sir Joseph Swan	Collier	Hall, Russell & Co. Ltd.	Aberdeen	United Kingdom	For London Power Co. Ltd.
6 September	Taksang	Cargo ship	Short Brothers Ltd.	Sunderland	United Kingdom	For Indo-China Steam Navigation Co. Ltd.
7 September	Cormist	Collier	Burntisland Shipbuilding Company	Burntisland	United Kingdom	For Wm. Cory & Son Ltd.
7 September	St. Augustine Victory	Victory ship	Bethlehem Fairfield Shipyard	Baltimore, Maryland	United States	For War Shipping Administration.
8 September	Empire Mayrover	C-type coaster	Cochrane & Sons Ltd	Selby	United Kingdom	For Ministry of Transport.
8 September	Empire Tedassa	TED-type coastal Tanker	Sir J. Laing & Sons Ltd.	Sunderland	United Kingdom	For Ministry of Transport.
8 September	Marin Hills	T2 tanker	Marinship Corporation	Sausalito, California	United States	For United States Maritime Commission.
8 September	TID 156	TID-class tug	William Pickersgill & Sons Ltd.	Sunderland	United Kingdom	For Ministry of War Transport.
10 September	Warwick Victory	Victory ship	California Shipbuilding Corporation	Los Angeles, California	United States	For War Shipping Administration.
11 September	Moccasin Gap	T2 Tanker	Alabama Drydock and Shipbuilding Company	Mobile, Alabama	United States	For War Shipping Administration.
12 September	Edward Burton	Liberty ship	J. A. Jones Construction Company	Panama City, Florida	United States	For War Shipping Administration.
12 September	Lynchburg Victory	Victory ship	Bethlehem Fairfield Shipyard	Baltimore, Maryland	United States	For War Shipping Administration.
12 September	TF40	Landing Ship, Tank	Harland & Wolff	Belfast	United Kingdom	For Royal Navy.
15 September	Clarksburg Victory	Victory ship	California Shipbuilding Corporation	Los Angeles, California	United States	For War Shipping Administration.
15 September	Parkersburg Victory	Victory ship	Bethlehem Fairfield Shipyard	Baltimore, Maryland	United States	For War Shipping Administration.
18 September	Empire Sally	Modified Warrior-type tug	John Crown & Sons Ltd.	Sunderland	United Kingdom	For Ministry of War Transport.
19 September	Atlantic City Victory	Victory ship	Bethlehem Fairfield Shipyard	Baltimore, Maryland	United States	For War Shipping Administration.
19 September	Pass Christian Victory	Victory ship	Bethlehem Fairfield Shipyard	Baltimore, Maryland	United States	For War Shipping Administration.
19 September	Palamcotta	Cargo ship	Lithgows Ltd.	Port Glasgow	United Kingdom	For British India Steam Navigation Co. Ltd.
19 September	Waterville Victory	Victory ship	Bethlehem Fairfield Shipyard	Baltimore, Maryland	United States	For War Shipping Administration.
20 September	San Angelo Victory	Victory ship	California Shipbuilding Corporation	Los Angeles, California	United States	For War Shipping Administration.
21 September	British Caution	Tanker	Swan, Hunter & Wigham Richardson Ltd.	Newcastle upon Tyne	United Kingdom	For British Tanker Co. Ltd.
21 September	Empire Netta	Modified Stella-type tug	George Brown & Co. (Marine) Ltd.	Greenock	United Kingdom	For Ministry of War Transport.
21 September	Empire Netta	Modified Stella-type tug	Fleming & Ferguson Ltd.	Paisley	United Kingdom	For Ministry of War Transport.
21 September	Empire Seaflower	Shelt-type coaster	Goole Shipbuilding & Repairing Co Ltd	Goole	United Kingdom	For Ministry of War Transport.
21 September	Rupertus	Gearing-class destroyer	Bethlehem Shipbuilding Corporation Fore River Shipyard	Quincy	United States	For United States Navy
22 September	Aby	Fishing trawler	Cook, Welton & Gemmell Ltd.	Beverley	United Kingdom	For Boston Deep Sea Fishing & Ice Co. Ltd.
22 September	Culgoa	Bay-class frigate	HMA Naval Dockyard	Williamstown, Victoria	Australia	
22 September	Hercules	Majestic-class aircraft carrier	Vickers-Armstrongs	Tyneside	United Kingdom	Sold to India. Completed in 1957 by Harland & Wolff as INS Vikrant.
22 September	Spokane	Atlanta-class cruiser	Federal Shipbuilding and Drydock Company	Kearny, New Jersey	United States	
22 September	VIC 103	Improved VIC lighter	Richards Ironworks Ltd.	Lowestoft	United Kingdom	For the Admiralty.
23 September	SS Chindit (1945)	Coaster	J. Hay & Sons Ltd.	Kirkintilloch	United Kingdom	For private owner.
25 September	Empire Tedilla	TED-type coastal tanker	Sir J. Laing & Sons Ltd.	Sunderland	United Kingdom	For Ministry of War Transport.
25 September	Southern Wheeler	Whaler	Smith's Dock Co. Ltd.	Middlesbrough	United Kingdom	For South Georgia Co. Ltd.
26 September	Albert M. Boe	Liberty ship	New England Shipbuilding Corporation	Portland, Maine	United States	For War Shipping Administration.
26 September	Cabusto	T2 Tanker	Alabama Drydock and Shipbuilding Company	Mobile, Alabama	United States	For War Shipping Administration.
26 September	Empire Nan	Modified Warrior-type tug	Scott & Sons Ltd.	Bowling	United Kingdom	For Ministry of War Transport.
26 September	Ora Ellis	Liberty ship	J. A. Jones Construction Company	Panama City, Florida	United States	For War Shipping Administration.
26 September	Walter F. Perry	Liberty ship	New England Shipbuilding Corporation	South Portland, Maine	United States	For War Shipping Administration.
27 September	Council Bluffs Victory	Victory ship	California Shipbuilding Corporation	Los Angeles, California	United States	For War Shipping Administration.
27 September	Larubi	Non-propelled dredger	Fleming & Ferguson Ltd.	Paisley	United Kingdom	For Anglo-Iranian Oil Co. Ltd.
27 September	VIC 35	VIC lighter	Isaac Pimblott & Sons Ltd.	Northwich	United Kingdom	For the Admiralty.
28 September	Billings Victory	Victory ship	Oregon Shipbuilding Corporation	Portland, Oregon	United States	For War Shipping Administration.
September	Actuality	Coaster	Goole Shipbuilding & Repairing Co. Ltd.	Goole	United Kingdom	For F. T. Everard & Co. Ltd.
September	Empire Seagrass	Shelt-type coaster	Goole Shipbuilding & Repairing Co Ltd	Goole	United Kingdom	For Ministry of War Transport.
September	LST 3519	Landing Ship, Tank	Davie Shipbuilding & Repairing Co. Ltd	Lauzon	Canada	For Royal Navy.
September	LST 3512	Landing Ship, Tank	Yarrows Ltd.	Esquimalt	Canada	For Royal Navy.
September	LST 3517	Landing Ship, Tank	Yarrows Ltd.	Esquimalt	Canada	For Royal Navy.
September	TID 165	TID-class tug	William Pickersgill & Sons Ltd.	Sunderland	United Kingdom	For the Admiralty.
September	TID 166	TID-class tug	William Pickersgill & Sons Ltd.	Sunderland	United Kingdom	For Ministry of War Transport.
1 October	Fort Mims	T2 Tanker	Alabama Drydock and Shipbuilding Company	Mobile, Alabama	United States	For War Shipping Administration.
3 October	Devon	Refrigerated cargo line	Alexander Stephen & Sons Ltd.	Linthouse	United Kingdom	For Federal Steam Navigation Co. Ltd.
4 October	Empire Tescombe	TES-type coastal tanker	Harland & Wolff	Govan	United Kingdom	For Ministry of War Transport.
5 October	Empire Teslin	TES-type coastal tanker	Swan, Hunter & Wigham Richardson Ltd.	Newcastle upon Tyne	United Kingdom	Completed as Fragun for Anglo-Saxon Petroleum Co. Ltd.
6 October	Empire Passmore	B-type coaster	Blyth Dry Docks & Shipbuilding Co. Ltd.	Blyth	United Kingdom	For Ministry of Transport.
6 October	Marinda	Trawler	John Lewis & Sons Ltd.	Aberdeen	United Kingdom	For J. Marr & Sons Ltd.
7 October	Southern Wilcox	Whaler	Smith's Dock Co. Ltd.	Middlesbrough	United Kingdom	For South Georgia Co. Ltd.
8 October	Bulby	Fishing trawler	Cook, Welton & Gemmell Ltd.	Beverley	United Kingdom	For Boston Deep Sea Fishing & Ice Co. Ltd.
8 October	Empire Champion	Dredger	William Simons & Co. Ltd.	Renfrew	United Kingdom	For Ministry of Transport.
8 October	Empire Seabright	Shelt-type coaster	Goole Shipbuilding & Repairing Co Ltd	Goole	United Kingdom	For Ministry of War Transport.
8 October	St. Bartholomew	Trawler	Cochrane & Sons Ltd	Selby	United Kingdom	For St. Andrews Steam Fishing Co. Ltd.
9 October	Bexar	Haskell-class attack transport	Oregon Shipbuilding Corporation	Portland, Oregon	United States	For United States Navy.
12 October	Seneca Castle	T2 Tanker	Alabama Drydock and Shipbuilding Company	Mobile, Alabama	United States	For War Shipping Administration.
13 October	Oriskany	Essex-class aircraft carrier	New York Navy Yard	New York City	United States	
17 October	Boise Victory	Victory ship	Oregon Shipbuilding Corporation	Portland, Oregon	United States	For War Shipping Administration.
19 October	Bencruachan	Cargo ship	J. L. Thompson & Sons Ltd.	Sunderland	United Kingdom	For Ben Line Steamers Ltd.
20 October	SV Golden Quest	Cargo ship	N&C Sundins Batbyggen, Kramfors	Kramfors, Sweden	Sweden	For Swedish American Line
22 October	Balmoral Queen	Coaster	Ardrossan Dockyard Ltd.	Ardrossan	United Kingdom	For British Channel Islands Shipping Co. Ltd.
22 October	Empire Frieda	Modified Stella-type tug	Ferguson Brothers (Port Glasgow) Co. Ltd.	Port Glasgow	United Kingdom	For Ministry of War Transport.
22 October	Empire Naseby	Wave-class oiler	Sir J. Laing & Sons Ltd.	Sunderland	United Kingdom	For Ministry of Transport. Completed as RFA Wave Knight for Royal Fleet Auxiliary.
22 October	Empire Tesdale	TES-type coastal tanker	Swan, Hunter & Wigham Richardson Ltd.	Newcastle upon Tyne	United Kingdom	Completed as Beme for Burmah Oil Co. (Tankers) Ltd.
23 October	Bentong	Icemaid type collier	Grangemouth Dockyard Co. Ltd.	Grangemouth	United Kingdom	For Singapore Straits Steamship Co. Ltd.
23 October	Benvorlich	Cargo ship	Charles Connell & Co Ltd	Glasgow	United Kingdom	For Ben Line.
23 October	Fukien	Cargo ship	William Gray & Co. Ltd.	West Hartlepool	United Kingdom	For China Navigation Co. Ltd.
23 October	Kanna	Cargo ship	Henry Robb Ltd.	Leith	United Kingdom	For Union Steamship Company of New Zealand Ltd.
23 October	Riebeeck Castle	Refrigerated cargo ship	Harland & Wolff	Belfast	United Kingdom	For Union-Castle Line.
24 October	Brainerd Victory	Victory ship	Oregon Shipbuilding Corporation	Portland, Oregon	United States	For War Shipping Administration.
24 October	City of Carlisle	Cargo ship	Cammell Laird & Co. Ltd.	Birkenhead	United Kingdom	For Ellerman & Bucknall Steamship Co. Ltd.
24 October	Neothyris	Tanker	Harland & Wolff Ltd.	Belfast	United Kingdom	For Anglo-Saxon Petroleum Co. Ltd.
24 October	Rock Landing	T2 Tanker	Alabama Drydock and Shipbuilding Company	Mobile, Alabama	United States	For War Shipping Administration.
25 October	Empire Zona	Modified Stella-type tug	Fleming & Ferguson Ltd.	Paisley	United Kingdom	For Ministry of War Transport.
25 October	Navena	Fishing trawler	Cook, Welton & Gemmell Ltd.	Beverley	United Kingdom	For J. Marr & Son Ltd.
25 October	VIC 75	VIC lighter	Brown's Shipbuilding & Drydock Co. Ltd.	Hull	United Kingdom	For the Admiralty.
29 October	Dane	Haskell-class attack transport	Oregon Shipbuilding Corporation	Portland, Oregon	United States	For United States Navy.
29 October	Glynn	Haskell-class attack transport	Oregon Shipbuilding Corporation	Portland, Oregon	United States	For United States Navy.
30 October	Black River	T2 Tanker	Alabama Drydock and Shipbuilding Company	Mobile, Alabama	United States	For War Shipping Administration.
31 October	Empire Tesella	TES-type coastal tanker	Harland & Wolff Ltd	Govan	United Kingdom	For Ministry of War Transport.
October	Birdwood	C-type coaster	S. P. Austin & Sons Ltd.	Sunderland	United Kingdom	For Wm. France, Fenwick & Co, Ltd.
October	LST 3523	Landing Ship, Tank	Davie Shipbuilding & Repairing Co. Ltd.	Lauzon	Canada	For Royal Navy.
October	Monarch	Cable laying ship	Swan, Hunter & Wigham Richardson Ltd.	Newcastle upon Tyne	United Kingdom	For H.M. Postmaster General.
October	TID 174	TID-class tug	Henry Scarr Ltd.	Hessle	United Kingdom	For French Government.
3 November	Hawaii	Alaska-class cruiser	New York Shipbuilding Corporation	Camden, New Jersey	United States	
3 November	VIC 64	VIC lighter	Isaac Pimblott & Sons Ltd.	Northwich	United Kingdom	For Ministry of War Transport.
5 November	Derrydare	Cargo ship	Burntisland Shipbuilding Company	Burntisland	United Kingdom	For McCowan and Cross Ltd.
5 November	VIC 98	VIC lighter	J. S. Watson (Gainsborough) Ltd.	Gainsborough	United Kingdom	For the Admiralty.
6 November	Empire Fenchurch	Tudor Queen type coaster	John Lewis & Sons Ltd.	Aberdeen	United Kingdom	For Ministry of Transport.
6 November	Empire Kedah	Cargo ship	Shipbuilding Corporation Ltd.	Sunderland	United Kingdom	For Ministry of Transport. Completed as Marshall for Kaye, Son & Co. Ltd.
7 November	British Success	Tanker	Blythswood Shipbuilding Co. Ltd.	Glasgow	United Kingdom	For British Tanker Co. Ltd.
7 November	St. Mark	Trawler	Cochrane & Sons Ltd	Selby	United Kingdom	For St. Andrews Steam Fishing Co. Ltd.
8 November	Rutland	C-type coaster	Ailsa Shipbuilding Co Ltd.	Troon	United Kingdom	For Currie Line Ltd.
9 November	Nearea	Tanker	R. & W. Hawthorn, Leslie and Co. Ltd.	Newcastle on Tyne	United Kingdom	For Anglo-Saxon Petroleum Co. Ltd.
17 November	Loksang	Cargo ship	Short Brothers Ltd.	Sunderland	United Kingdom	For Indo-China Steam Navigation Co. Ltd.
18 November	Valley Forge	Essex-class aircraft carrier	Philadelphia Navy Yard	Philadelphia	United States	
19 November	Empire Flamborough	Cargo ship	William Pickersgill & Sons Ltd.	Southwick	United Kingdom	For Ministry of Transport
19 November	Empire Maldon	Intermediate type tanker	Sir J. Laing & Sons Ltd.	Sunderland	United Kingdom	For Ministry of Transport.
20 November	Empire Antigua	Cargo ship	Shipbuilding Corporation Ltd	Newcastle upon Tyne	United Kingdom	For Ministry of Transport
20 November	Empire Park	B-type coaster	Blyth Dry Docks & Shipbuilding Co. Ltd.	Blyth	United Kingdom	For Ministry of Transport.
20 November	Fengtien	Cargo ship	William Gray & Co. Ltd.	West Hartlepool	United Kingdom	For China Navigation Co. Ltd.
20 November	Obra	Cargo ship	John Readhead & Sons Ltd.	South Shields	United Kingdom	For British India Steam Navigation Co. Ltd.
20 November	Oliver Bury	Collier	Burntisland Shipbuilding Company	Burntisland	United Kingdom	For London Power Co, Ltd.
20 November	Pentakota	Cargo ship	Lithgows Ltd.	Port Glasgow	United Kingdom	For British India Steam Navigation Co. Ltd.
20 November	TID 171	TID-class tug	Henry Scarr Ltd.	Hessle	United Kingdom	For Ministry of War Transport.
20 November	Wave Sovereign	Wave-class oiler	Furness Shipbuilding Co. Ltd.	Haverton Hill-on-Tees	United Kingdom	For Royal Fleet Auxiliary.
21 November	Empire Tesbury	TES-type coastal tanker	Bartram & Sons Ltd	Sunderland	United Kingdom	For Ministry of War Transport.
21 November	Empire Tesville	TES-type coastal tanker	Bartram & Sons Ltd	Sunderland	United Kingdom	For Ministry of War Transport.
21 November	Katui	Cargo ship	Henry Robb Ltd.	Leith	United Kingdom	For Union Steamship Company of New Zealand Ltd.
21 November	St. Botolph	Fishing trawler	Cook, Welton & Gemmell Ltd.	Beverley	United Kingdom	For St. Andrew's Steam Fishing Co. Ltd.
22 November	Cargo Fleet No.3	Hopper barge	Fleming & Ferguson Ltd.	Paisley	United Kingdom	For Cargo Fleet Iron Co.
22 November	City of Lucknow	Cargo ship	William Denny and Brothers Ltd.	Dumbarton	United Kingdom	For Ellerman's Hall Line Co. Ltd.
22 November	King Orry	Ferry	Cammell Laird & Co. Ltd.	Birkenhead	United Kingdom	For Isle of Man Steam Packet Co. Ltd.
22 November	VIC 56	VIC lighter	J. Pollock & Sons Ltd.	Faversham	United Kingdom	For the Admiralty.
23 November	Empire Seabank	Shelt-type coaster	Goole Shipbuilding & Repairing Co Ltd	Goole	United Kingdom	For Ministry of War Transport.
27 November	Empire Lewisham	Tudor Queen type coaster	G. Brown & Co. (Marine) Ltd.	Greenock	United Kingdom	For Ministry of Transport.
30 November	Empire Tedport	TED-type coastal tanker	A & J Inglis Ltd.	Glasgow	United Kingdom	For Ministry of Transport.
30 November	Empire Tedship	TED-type coastal tanker	A &J Inglis Ltd	Glasgow	United Kingdom	For Ministry of Transport.
November	City of Khartoum	Cargo ship	Barclay, Curle & Co. Ltd.	Glasgow	United Kingdom	For Ellerman Lines.
November	LST 3042	Landing Ship, Tank	Harland & Wolff Ltd	Govan	United Kingdom	For Royal Navy.
November	LST 3524	Landing Ship, Tank	Davie Shipbuilding & Repairing Co. Ltd.	Lauzon	Canada	For Royal Navy.
November	LST 3525	Landing Ship, Tank	Davie Shipbuilding & Repairing Co. Ltd.	Lauzon	Canada	For Royal Navy.
November	LST 3534	Landing Ship, Tank	Yarrows Ltd.	Esquimalt	Canada	For Royal Navy.
November	TID 172	TID-class tug	Henry Scarr Ltd.	Hessle	United Kingdom	For the Admiralty. Completed as Martello.
November	TID 175	TID-class tug	Henry Scarr Ltd.	Hessle	United Kingdom	For the Ministry of Shipping.
November	TID 176	TID-class tug	Henry Scarr Ltd.	Hessle	United Kingdom	For the Ministry of Shipping.
4 December	Braconvale	Trawler	John Lewis & Sons Ltd.	Aberdeen	United Kingdom	For Don Fishing Co. Ltd.
4 December	Stentor	Cargo ship	Caledon Shipbuilding & Engineering Co. Ltd.	Dundee	United Kingdom	For Ocean Steamship Co. Ltd.
5 December	Empire Wessex	Refrigerated cargo liner	Harland & Wolff Ltd.	Belfast	United Kingdom	For Ministry of Shipping. Completed as Port Hobart for Port Line].
10 December	Empire Rosa	Modified Stella-type tug	Blyth Dry Docks & Shipbuilding Co. Ltd.	Blyth	United Kingdom	For Ministry of War Transport.
10 December	Beaverglen	Cargo ship	Lithgows Ltd.	Port Glasgow	United Kingdom	For Canadian Pacific Steamships Ltd.
15 December	Empire Rita	Modified Stella-type tug	Ferguson Bros. Ltd.	Port Glasgow	United Kingdom	For Ministry of War Transport.
16 December	Northella	Trawler	Cochrane & Sons Ltd	Selby	United Kingdom	For J. Marr & Son Ltd.
18 December	Szechuen	Cargo ship	Caledon Shipbuilding & Engineering Co. Ltd.	Dundee	United Kingdom	For China Navigation Co. Ltd.
19 December	Empire Hilda	Modified Stella-type tug	Blyth Dry Docks & Shipbuilding Co. Ltd.	Blyth	United Kingdom	For Ministry of War Transport.
19 December	Keynes	C-type coaster	S. P. Austin & Sons Ltd.	Sunderland	United Kingdom	For Stephenson, Clarke Ltd.
19 December	Kittiwake	Cargo ship	Burntisland Shipbuilding Company	Burntisland	United Kingdom	For British & Continental Steamship Co. Ltd.
20 December	Cornrake	Cargo ship	Henry Robb Ltd.	Leith	United Kingdom	For General Steam Navigation Co. Ltd.
20 December	Empire Grenada	Ocean type tanker	Harland & Wolff	Govan	United Kingdom	For Ministry of Transport. Completed as British Piper for British Tanker Company.
20 December	Empire Maysong	C-type Coaster	Scott & Sons	Bowling	United Kingdom	For Ministry of Transport.
20 December	Snipe	Modified Black Swan-class sloop			United Kingdom	
21 December	City of Swansea	Cargo ship	Barclay, Curle & Co. Ltd.	Glasgow	United Kingdom	For Ellerman Lines.
21 December	Empire Moorland	Dredger	William Simons & Co. Ltd.	Renfrew	United Kingdom	For Ministry of Transport.
21 December	Empire Roderick	Near-Warrior type tug	A Hall & Co Ltd	Aberdeen	United Kingdom	For Ministry of War Transport.
22 December	Friargate	Coaster	Goole Shipbuilding & Repairing Co. Ltd.	Goole	United Kingdom	For Hull Gates Shipping Co. Ltd.
24 December	Empire Canute	Heavy lift ship	Greenock Dockyard Co. Ltd.	Greenock	United Kingdom	For Ministry of Transport. Completed as Belocean for Belships Ltd.
31 December	Empire Maymorn	[C-type coaster	Charles Hill & Sons Ltd	Bristol	United Kingdom	For Ministry of Transport.
Date unknown	Ashburton	Cargo ship	William Denny and Brothers Ltd.	Dumbarton	United Kingdom	For Australind Steam Shipping Co. Ltd.
Date unknown	Avoca	T1 tanker	St. Johns River Shipbuilding Company	Jacksonville, Florida	United States	For United States Navy. Completed by Maryland Drydock Company as Petaluna for private owner.
Date unknown	Becket Bend	Type C1 ship	Southeastern Shipbuilding Corporation	Savannah, Georgia	United States	For War Shipping Administration.
Date unknown	Bell Ringer	Type C1 ship	J. A. Jones Construction Co.	Brunswick, Georgia	United States	For United States Maritime Commission.
Date unknown	Bhopal	Paddle steamer	William Denny and Brothers Ltd.	Dumbarton	United Kingdom	For India General Navigation & Railway Company.
Date unknown	Bishops Beagle	Lighter	W. J. Yarwood & Sons Ltd.	Northwich	United Kingdom	For Liverpool Lighterage Co. Ltd. and/or Bishops Wharf Carrying Co. Ltd.
Date unknown	Bishops Whippet	Lighter	W. J. Yarwood & Sons Ltd.	Northwich	United Kingdom	For Liverpool Lighterage Co. Ltd. and/or Bishops Wharf Carrying Co. Ltd.
Date unknown	Butley	Launch	British Power Boat Company	Hythe	United Kingdom	For Royal Army Service Corps.
Date unknown	Capable	Nimble-class tug	Cochrane & Sons Ltd.	Selby	United Kingdom	For the Admiralty.
Date unknown	Careful	Nimble-class tug	Cochrane & Sons Ltd.	Selby	United Kingdom	For the Admiralty.
Date unknown	Check Knot	Type C1 ship	Southeastern Shipbuilding Corporation	Savannah, Georgia	United States	For War Shipping Administration.
Date unknown	Coastal Captain	Type C1 ship	J. A. Jones Construction Co.	Brunswick, Georgia	United States	For United States Maritime Commission.
Date unknown	Coastal Mariner	Type C1 ship	J. A. Jones Construction Co.	Brunswick, Georgia	United States	For United States Maritime Commission.
Date unknown	Coastal Ranger	Type C1 ship	J. A. Jones Construction Co.	Brunswick, Georgia	United States	For United States Maritime Commission.
Date unknown	Crown and Diamond	Type C1 ship	J. A. Jones Construction Co.	Brunswick, Georgia	United States	For United States Maritime Commission.
Date unknown	Diamond Hitch	Type C1 ship	Southeastern Shipbuilding Corporation	Savannah, Georgia	United States	For War Shipping Administration.
Date unknown	Double Loop	Type C1 ship	Southeastern Shipbuilding Corporation	Savannah, Georgia	United States	For War Shipping Administration.
Date unknown	Empire Chancellor	Tanker	Sir J Laing & Sons Ltd	Sunderland	United Kingdom	For Ministry of War Transport
Date unknown	Empire Ensign	Tanker	J.L. Thompson and Sons	Sunderland	United Kingdom	For Ministry of War Transport
Date unknown	Empire Frome	Cargo ship	Flensburger Schiffbau-Gesellschaft	Flensburg	Allied-occupied Germany	For Ministry of War Transport
Date unknown	Eola	T1 tanker	St. Johns River Shipbuilding Company	Jacksonville, Florida	United States	For United States Navy. Completed by Maryland Drydock Company as Truckee for private owner.
Date unknown	Expert	Nimble-class tug	Cochrane & Sons Ltd.	Selby	United Kingdom	For the Admiralty.
Date unknown	Flemish Knot	Type C1 ship	Southeastern Shipbuilding Corporation	Savannah, Georgia	United States	For War Shipping Administration.
Date unknown	Half Knot	Type C1 ship	Southeastern Shipbuilding Corporation	Savannah, Georgia	United States	For War Shipping Administration.
Date unknown	Hermes	Cargo ship	NV Scheepswerke Gebroeders Pot	Bolnes	Netherlands	For Koninklijke Nederlandsche Stoomboot Maatschappij
Date unknown	Horseshoe Splice	Type C1 ship	Southeastern Shipbuilding Corporation	Savannah, Georgia	United States	For War Shipping Administration.
Date unknown	Indore	Paddle steamer	William Denny and Brothers Ltd.	Dumbarton	United Kingdom	For India General Navigation & Railway Company.
Date unknown	Klikitat	T1 tanker	St. Johns River Shipbuilding Company	Jacksonville, Florida	United States	For United States Navy.
Date unknown	Lafitte	T1 tanker	St. Johns River Shipbuilding Company	Jacksonville, Florida	United States	For United States Navy. Completed by Maryland Drydock Company as Quinnebaug for private owner.
Date unknown	Link Splice	Type C1 ship	Southeastern Shipbuilding Corporation	Savannah, Georgia	United States	For War Shipping Administration.
Date unknown	Lock Knot	Type C1 ship	J. A. Jones Construction Co.	Brunswick, Georgia	United States	For United States Maritime Commission.
Date unknown	Long Eye	Type C1 ship	Southeastern Shipbuilding Corporation	Savannah, Georgia	United States	For War Shipping Administration.
Date unknown	Louden	T1 tanker	St. Johns River Shipbuilding Company	Jacksonville, Florida	United States	For United States Navy. Completed by Maryland Drydock Company as Piscataqua for private owner.
Date unknown	LST 3001	Landing Ship, Tank	Vickers-Armstrongs Ltd.	Newcastle upon Tyne	United Kingdom	For Royal Navy.
Date unknown	LST 3004	Landing Ship, Tank	Vickers-Armstrongs Ltd.	Newcastle upon Tyne	United Kingdom	Completed at Rio de Janeiro, Brazil in 1950 as Rio Tejo for E. G. Fontes & Cia.
Date unknown	LST 3009	Landing Ship, Tank	Harland & Wolff Ltd.	Belfast	United Kingdom	For Royal Navy.
Date unknown	LST 3015	Landing Ship, Tank	Barclay, Curle & Co. Ltd.	Glasgow	United Kingdom	For Royal Navy.
Date unknown	LST 3018	Landing Ship, Tank	R. &. W. Hawthorn, Leslie & Co. Ltd.	Newcastle upon Tyne	United Kingdom	Completed at Rio de Janeiro in 1949 as Rio Minho for E. G. Fontes & Cia.
Date unknown	LST 3021	Landing Ship, Tank	Lithgows Ltd.	Port Glasgow	United Kingdom	For Royal Navy.
Date unknown	LST 3023	Landing Ship, Tank	Lithgows Ltd.	Port Glasgow	United Kingdom	Completed at Rio de Janeiro in 1949 as Rio Guadiana for E. G. Fontes & Cia.
Date unknown	LST 3024	Landing Ship, Tank	Smith's Dock Co. Ltd.	North Shields	United Kingdom	For Royal Navy.
Date unknown	LST 3028	Landing Ship, Tank	A. Stephen Ltd		United Kingdom	For Royal Navy.
Date unknown	LST 3030	Landing Ship, Tank	Hall, Russell & Co. Ltd	Aberdeen	United Kingdom	Completed in 1949 as the factory ship Clupea for S. Bartz-Johannessen.
Date unknown	LST 3032	Landing Ship, Tank	C. Connell & Co. Ltd	Glasgow	United Kingdom	Completed at Rio de Janeiro in 1950 as Rio Mondego for E. G. Fontes & Cia.
Date Unknown	LST 3033	Landing Ship, Tank	William Pickersgill & Sons Ltd.	Sunderland	United Kingdom	For Royal Navy.
Date unknown	LST 3037	Landing Ship, Tank	Fairfield Ltd.	Govan	United Kingdom	For Royal Navy.
Date unknown	LST 3039	Landing Ship, Tank	Fairfield Ltd.	Govan	United Kingdom	Completed at Rio de Janeiro in 1951 as Rio Douro for E. G. Fontes & Cia.
Date unknown	LST 3509	Landing Ship, Tank	Davie Shipbuilding & Repairing Co. Ltd.	Lauzon	Canada	For Royal Navy.
Date unknown	MFV-40	Naval Motor Fishing Vessel	Brooke Marine Ltd.	Lowestoft	United Kingdom	For Royal Navy.
Date unknown	MFV-231	Naval Motor Fishing Vessel	Anderson, Rigden & Perkins Ltd.	Whitstable	United Kingdom	For Royal Navy.
Date unknown	MFV-283	Naval Motor Fishing Vessel	Anderson, Rigden & Perkins Ltd.	Whitstable	United Kingdom	For Royal Navy.
Date unknown	MFV-326	Naval Motor Fishing Vessel	Brooke Marine Ltd.	Lowestoft	United Kingdom	For Royal Navy.
Date unknown	MFV-435	Naval Motor Fishing Vessel	J. Bolson & Son Ltd.	Poole	United Kingdom	For Royal Navy.
Date unknown	MFV-698	Naval Motor Fishing Vessel	J. Bolson & Son Ltd.	Poole	United Kingdom	For Royal Navy.
Date unknown	MFV-699	Naval Motor Fishing Vessel	J. Bolson & Son Ltd.	Poole	United Kingdom	For Royal Navy.
Date unknown	MFV-700	Naval Motor Fishing Vessel	J. Bolson & Son Ltd.	Poole	United Kingdom	For Royal Navy.
Date unknown	MFV-701	Naval Motor Fishing Vessel	J. Bolson & Son Ltd.	Poole	United Kingdom	For Royal Navy.
Date unknown	MFV-702	Naval Motor Fishing Vessel	J. Bolson & Son Ltd.	Poole	United Kingdom	For Royal Navy.
Date unknown	MFV-703	Naval Motor Fishing Vessel	J. Bolson & Son Ltd.	Poole	United Kingdom	For Royal Navy.
Date unknown	MFV-704	Naval Motor Fishing Vessel	J. Bolson & Son Ltd.	Poole	United Kingdom	For Royal Navy.
Date unknown	MFV-705	Naval Motor Fishing Vessel	J. Bolson & Son Ltd.	Poole	United Kingdom	For Royal Navy.
Date unknown	MFV-706	Naval Motor Fishing Vessel	J. Bolson & Son Ltd.	Poole	United Kingdom	For Royal Navy.
Date unknown	MFV-707	Naval Motor Fishing Vessel	J. Bolson & Son Ltd.	Poole	United Kingdom	For Royal Navy.
Date unknown	MFV-708	Naval Motor Fishing Vessel	J. Bolson & Son Ltd.	Poole	United Kingdom	For Royal Navy.
Date unknown	MFV-709	Naval Motor Fishing Vessel	J. Bolson & Son Ltd.	Poole	United Kingdom	For Royal Navy.
Date unknown	MFV-726	Naval Motor Fishing Vessel	J. Bolson & Son Ltd.	Poole	United Kingdom	For Royal Navy.
Date unknown	MFV-727	Naval Motor Fishing Vessel	J. Bolson & Son Ltd.	Poole	United Kingdom	For Royal Navy.
Date unknown	MFV-728	Naval Motor Fishing Vessel	J. Bolson & Son Ltd.	Poole	United Kingdom	For Royal Navy.
Date unknown	MFV-729	Naval Motor Fishing Vessel	J. Bolson & Son Ltd.	Poole	United Kingdom	For Royal Navy.
Date unknown	MFV-730	Naval Motor Fishing Vessel	J. Bolson & Son Ltd.	Poole	United Kingdom	For Royal Navy.
Date unknown	MFV-731	Naval Motor Fishing Vessel	J. Bolson & Son Ltd.	Poole	United Kingdom	For Royal Navy.
Date unknown	MFV-732	Naval Motor Fishing Vessel	J. Bolson & Son Ltd.	Poole	United Kingdom	For Royal Navy.
Date unknown	MFV-733	Naval Motor Fishing Vessel	J. Bolson & Son Ltd.	Poole	United Kingdom	For Royal Navy.
Date unknown	MFV-734	Naval Motor Fishing Vessel	J. Bolson & Son Ltd.	Poole	United Kingdom	For Royal Navy.
Date unknown	MFV-735	Naval Motor Fishing Vessel	J. Bolson & Son Ltd.	Poole	United Kingdom	For Royal Navy.
Date unknown	MFV-735	Naval Motor Fishing Vessel	J. Bolson & Son Ltd.	Poole	United Kingdom	For Royal Navy.
Date unknown	MFV-737	Naval Motor Fishing Vessel	J. Bolson & Son Ltd.	Poole	United Kingdom	For Royal Navy.
Date unknown	MFV-738	Naval Motor Fishing Vessel	J. Bolson & Son Ltd.	Poole	United Kingdom	For Royal Navy.
Date unknown	MFV-739	Naval Motor Fishing Vessel	J. Bolson & Son Ltd.	Poole	United Kingdom	For Royal Navy.
Date unknown	MFV-740	Naval Motor Fishing Vessel	J. Bolson & Son Ltd.	Poole	United Kingdom	For Royal Navy.
Date unknown	MFV-741	Naval Motor Fishing Vessel	J. Bolson & Son Ltd.	Poole	United Kingdom	For Royal Navy.
Date unknown	MFV-742	Naval Motor Fishing Vessel	J. Bolson & Son Ltd.	Poole	United Kingdom	For Royal Navy.
Date unknown	MFV-743	Naval Motor Fishing Vessel	J. Bolson & Son Ltd.	Poole	United Kingdom	For Royal Navy.
Date unknown	MFV-744	Naval Motor Fishing Vessel	J. Bolson & Son Ltd.	Poole	United Kingdom	For Royal Navy.
Date unknown	MFV-745	Naval Motor Fishing Vessel	J. Bolson & Son Ltd.	Poole	United Kingdom	For Royal Navy.
Date unknown	MFV-746	Naval Motor Fishing Vessel	J. Bolson & Son Ltd.	Poole	United Kingdom	For Royal Navy.
Date unknown	MFV-747	Naval Motor Fishing Vessel	J. Bolson & Son Ltd.	Poole	United Kingdom	For Royal Navy.
Date unknown	MFV-748	Naval Motor Fishing Vessel	J. Bolson & Son Ltd.	Poole	United Kingdom	For Royal Navy.
Date unknown	MFV-749	Naval Motor Fishing Vessel	J. Bolson & Son Ltd.	Poole	United Kingdom	For Royal Navy.
Date unknown	MFV-750	Naval Motor Fishing Vessel	J. Bolson & Son Ltd.	Poole	United Kingdom	For Royal Navy.
Date unknown	MFV-751	Naval Motor Fishing Vessel	J. Bolson & Son Ltd.	Poole	United Kingdom	For Royal Navy.
Date unknown	MFV-752	Naval Motor Fishing Vessel	J. Bolson & Son Ltd.	Poole	United Kingdom	For Royal Navy.
Date unknown	MFV-753	Naval Motor Fishing Vessel	J. Bolson & Son Ltd.	Poole	United Kingdom	For Royal Navy.
Date unknown	MFV-754	Naval Motor Fishing Vessel	J. Bolson & Son Ltd.	Poole	United Kingdom	For Royal Navy.
Date unknown	MFV-755	Naval Motor Fishing Vessel	J. Bolson & Son Ltd.	Poole	United Kingdom	For Royal Navy.
Date unknown	MFV-756	Naval Motor Fishing Vessel	J. Bolson & Son Ltd.	Poole	United Kingdom	For Royal Navy.
Date unknown	MFV-757	Naval Motor Fishing Vessel	J. Bolson & Son Ltd.	Poole	United Kingdom	For Royal Navy.
Date unknown	MFV-758	Naval Motor Fishing Vessel	J. Bolson & Son Ltd.	Poole	United Kingdom	For Royal Navy.
Date unknown	MFV-759	Naval Motor Fishing Vessel	J. Bolson & Son Ltd.	Poole	United Kingdom	For Royal Navy.
Date unknown	MFV-760	Naval Motor Fishing Vessel	J. Bolson & Son Ltd.	Poole	United Kingdom	For Royal Navy.
Date unknown	MFV-761	Naval Motor Fishing Vessel	J. Bolson & Son Ltd.	Poole	United Kingdom	For Royal Navy.
Date unknown	MFV-762	Naval Motor Fishing Vessel	J. Bolson & Son Ltd.	Poole	United Kingdom	For Royal Navy.
Date unknown	MFV-763	Naval Motor Fishing Vessel	J. Bolson & Son Ltd.	Poole	United Kingdom	For Royal Navy.
Date unknown	MFV-764	Naval Motor Fishing Vessel	J. Bolson & Son Ltd.	PooleEngihneering	United Kingdom	For Royal Navy.
Date unknown	MFV-765	Naval Motor Fishing Vessel	J. Bolson & Son Ltd.	Poole	United Kingdom	For Royal Navy.
Date unknown	MFV-767	Naval Motor Fishing Vessel	J. Bolson & Son Ltd.	Poole	United Kingdom	For Royal Navy.
Date unknown	MFV-768	Naval Motor Fishing Vessel	J. Bolson & Son Ltd.	Poole	United Kingdom	For Royal Navy.
Date unknown	MFV-769	Naval Motor Fishing Vessel	J. Bolson & Son Ltd.	Poole	United Kingdom	For Royal Navy.
Date unknown	MFV-770	Naval Motor Fishing Vessel	J. Bolson & Son Ltd.	Poole	United Kingdom	For Royal Navy.
Date unknown	MFV-771	Naval Motor Fishing Vessel	J. Bolson & Son Ltd.	Poole	United Kingdom	For Royal Navy.
Date unknown	MFV-772	Naval Motor Fishing Vessel	J. Bolson & Son Ltd.	Poole	United Kingdom	For Royal Navy.
Date unknown	MFV-773	Naval Motor Fishing Vessel	J. Bolson & Son Ltd.	Poole	United Kingdom	For Royal Navy.
Date unknown	MFV-774	Naval Motor Fishing Vessel	J. Bolson & Son Ltd.	Poole	United Kingdom	For Royal Navy.
Date unknown	MFV-775	Naval Motor Fishing Vessel	J. Bolson & Son Ltd.	Poole	United Kingdom	For Royal Navy.
Date unknown	MFV.1223	Motor Fishing Vessel	Berthon Boat Co. Ltd	Lymington	United Kingdom	For Royal Navy.
Date unknown	MFV.1224	Motor Fishing Vessel	Berthon Boat Co. Ltd	Lymington	United Kingdom	For Royal Navy.
Date unknown	Michigamme	T1 tanker	St. Johns River Shipbuilding Company	Jacksonville, Florida	United States	For United States Navy.
Date unknown	MOB 1	Military Oil Barge	J. Harker Ltd.	Knottingley	United Kingdom	For the Admiralty.
Date unknown	MOB 2	Military Oil Barge	J. Harker Ltd.	Knottingley	United Kingdom	For the Admiralty.
Date unknown	Mooring Hitch	Type C1 ship	J. A. Jones Construction Co.	Brunswick, Georgia	United States	For United States Maritime Commission.
Date unknown	Mysore	Paddle steamer	William Denny and Brothers Ltd.	Dumbarton	United Kingdom	For India General Navigation & Railway Company.
Date unknown	NA.209	Lighter	J. Bolson & Son Ltd.	Poole	United Kingdom	For British Army.
Date unknown	NA.210	Lighter	J. Bolson & Son Ltd.	Poole	United Kingdom	For British Army.
Date unknown	NA.211	Lighter	J. Bolson & Son Ltd.	Poole	United Kingdom	For British Army.
Date unknown	NA.212	Lighter	J. Bolson & Son Ltd.	Poole	United Kingdom	For British Army.
Date unknown	Nanticoke	T1 tanker	St. Johns River Shipbuilding Company	Jacksonville, Florida	United States	For United States Navy.
Date unknown	Nodaway	T1 tanker	St. Johns River Shipbuilding Company	Jacksonville, Florida	United States	For United States Navy. Completed by Merrill-Stevens Drydock & Repair Co. as West Ranch for private owner.
Date unknown	Peconic	T1 tanker	St. Johns River Shipbuilding Company	Jacksonville, Florida	United States	For United States Navy.
Date unknown	Rigger's Eye	Type C1 ship	J. A. Jones Construction Co.	Brunswick, Georgia	United States	For United States Maritime Commission.
Date unknown	Ring Splice	Type C1 ship	J. A. Jones Construction Co.	Brunswick, Georgia	United States	For United States Maritime Commission.
Date unknown	Sebasticook	T1 tanker	St. Johns River Shipbuilding Company	Jacksonville, Florida	United States	For United States Navy. Completed by Maryland Drydock Company as Mexia for private owner.
Date unknown	Shell Bar	Type C1 ship	J. A. Jones Construction Co.	Brunswick, Georgia	United States	For United States Maritime Commission.
Date unknown	Sinnet	Type C1 ship	J. A. Jones Construction Co.	Brunswick, Georgia	United States	For United States Maritime Commission.
Date unknown	Snakehead	Type C1 ship	Southeastern Shipbuilding Corporation	Savannah, Georgia	United States	For War Shipping Administration.
Date unknown	Span Splice	Type C1 ship	J. A. Jones Construction Co.	Brunswick, Georgia	United States	For United States Maritime Commission.
Date unknown	Tag Knot	Type C1 ship	J. A. Jones Construction Co.	Brunswick, Georgia	United States	For United States Maritime Commission.
Date unknown	Tancred	T1 tanker	J. A. Jones Construction Company	Panama City, Florida	United States	For War Shipping Administration.
Date unknown	Tandora	T1 tanker	J. A. Jones Construction Company	Panama City, Florida	United States	For War Shipping Administration.
Date unknown	Tannadice	T1 tanker	J. A. Jones Construction Company	Panama City, Florida	United States	For War Shipping Administration.
Date unknown	Tannaquil	T1 tanker	J. A. Jones Construction Company	Panama City, Florida	United States	For War Shipping Administration.
Date unknown	Tanova	T1 tanker	J. A. Jones Construction Company	Panama City, Florida	United States	For War Shipping Administration.
Date unknown	Tantallon	T1 tanker	J. A. Jones Construction Company	Panama City, Florida	United States	For War Shipping Administration.
Date unknown	Tarantella	T1 tanker	Todd Houston Shipbuilding Corporation	Houston, Texas	United States	For War Shipping Administration.
Date unknown	Tarascon	T1 tanker	Todd Houston Shipbuilding Corporation	Houston, Texas	United States	For War Shipping Administration.
Date unknown	Tarauca	T1 tanker	Todd Houston Shipbuilding Corporation	Houston, Texas	United States	For War Shipping Administration.
Date unknown	Tarcoola	T1 tanker	Todd Houston Shipbuilding Corporation	Houston, Texas	United States	For War Shipping Administration.
Date unknown	Tarlac	T1 tanker	Todd Houston Shipbuilding Corporation	Houston, Texas	United States	For War Shipping Administration.
Date unknown	Tarland	T1 tanker	Todd Houston Shipbuilding Corporation	Houston, Texas	United States	For War Shipping Administration.
Date unknown	Tarleton	T1 tanker	Todd Houston Shipbuilding Corporation	Houston, Texas	United States	For War Shipping Administration.
Date unknown	Tarogle	T1 tanker	Todd Houston Shipbuilding Corporation	Houston, Texas	United States	For War Shipping Administration.
Date unknown	Tartary	T1 tanker	Todd Houston Shipbuilding Corporation	Houston, Texas	United States	For War Shipping Administration.
Date unknown	Tavern	T1 tanker	Todd Houston Shipbuilding Corporation	Houston, Texas	United States	For War Shipping Administration.
Date unknown	Taverton	T1 tanker	Todd Houston Shipbuilding Corporation	Houston, Texas	United States	For War Shipping Administration.
Date unknown	Tarves	T1 tanker	Todd Houston Shipbuilding Corporation	Houston, Texas	United States	For War Shipping Administration.
Date unknown	Tavispan	T1 tanker	Todd Houston Shipbuilding Corporation	Houston, Texas	United States	For War Shipping Administration.
Date unknown	Taveta	T1 tanker	Todd Houston Shipbuilding Corporation	Houston, Texas	United States	For War Shipping Administration.
Date unknown	TID 157	TID-class tug	William Pickersgill & Sons Ltd.	Sunderland	United Kingdom	For Ministry of War Transport.
Date unknown	TID 158	TID-class tug	William Pickersgill & Sons Ltd.	Sunderland	United Kingdom	For Ministry of War Transport.
Date unknown	TID 159	TID-class tug	William Pickersgill & Sons Ltd.	Sunderland	United Kingdom	For Ministry of War Transport.
Date unknown	TID 160	TID-class tug	William Pickersgill & Sons Ltd.	Sunderland	United Kingdom	For the French Government.
Date unknown	TID 167	TID-class tug	William Pickersgill & Sons Ltd.	Sunderland	United Kingdom	For Ministry of War Transport.
Date unknown	TID 170	TID-class tug	Henry Scarr Ltd.	Hessle	United Kingdom	For Ministry of War Transport.
Date unknown	TID 177	TID-class tug	William Pickersgill & Sons Ltd.	Sunderland	United Kingdom	For the Ministry of War Transport.
Date unknown	True Knot	Type C1 ship	J. A. Jones Construction Co.	Brunswick, Georgia	United States	For United States Maritime Commission.
Date unknown	Vigore	Paddle steamer	William Denny and Brothers Ltd.	Dumbarton	United Kingdom	For India General Navigation & Railway Company.
Date unknown	Ville Platte	T1 tanker	St. Johns River Shipbuilding Company	Jacksonville, Florida	United States	For United States Navy. Completed by Todd Brooklyn as Tellico for private owner.
Date unknown	White Castle	T1 tanker	St. Johns River Shipbuilding Company	Jacksonville, Florida	United States	For United States Navy. Completed by Rickmerswerft as Kiamichi for private owner.
