= List of Liberty ships (M) =

This is a list of Liberty ships with names beginning with M.

== Description ==
The standard Liberty ship (EC-2-S-C1 type) was a cargo ship 441 feet 6 inches (134.57 m) long overall, with a beam of 56 feet 10 3/4 inches (17.34 m). It had a depth of 37 feet 4 inches (11.38 m) and a draft of 26 feet 10 inches (8.18 m). It was powered by a triple expansion steam engine, which had cylinders of 24 1/2 inches (62 cm), 37 inches (94 cm) and 70 inches (180 cm) diameter by 48 inches (120 cm) stroke. The engine produced 2,500ihp at 76rpm. Driving a four-blade propeller 18 feet 6 inches (5.64 m) in diameter, could propel the ship at 11 knots (20 km/h).

Cargo was carried in five holds, numbered 1–5 from bow to stern. Grain capacity was 84,183 cubic feet (2,383.8 m^{3}), 145,604 cubic feet (4,123.0 m^{3}), 96,429 cubic feet (2,730.6 m^{3}), 93,190 cubic feet (2,639 m^{3}) and 93,190 cubic feet (2,639 m^{3}), with a further 49,086 cubic feet (1,390.0 m^{3}) in the deep tanks. Bale capacity was 75,405 cubic feet (2,135.2 m^{3}), 134,638 cubic feet (3,812.5 m^{3}), 83,697 cubic feet (2,370.0 m^{3}), 82,263 cubic feet (2,329.4 m^{3}) and 82,435 cubic feet (2,334.3 m^{3}), with a further 41,135 cubic feet (1,164.8 m^{3}) in the deep tanks.

It carried a crew of 45, plus 36 United States Navy Armed Guard gunners. Later in the war, this was altered to a crew of 52, plus 29 gunners. Accommodation was in a three deck superstructure placed midships. The galley was equipped with a range, a 25 US gallons (95 L) stock kettle and other appliances. Messrooms were equipped with an electric hot plate and an electric toaster.

== Mack Bruton Bryan ==
Mack Bruton Bryan was built by Southeastern Shipbuilding Corporation, Savannah, Georgia. Her keel was laid on 24 November 1944. She was launched on 30 December and delivered on 18 January 1945. Built for the War Shipping Administration (WSA), she was operated under the management of Merchants & Miners Transportation Co. She was laid up in 1945. Reactivated in 1948 under the management of Lykes Brothers Steamship Company. Laid up at Mobile, Alabama in 1949. Sold in 1951 to American Union Transport Inc., New York and renamed Transunion. Placed under the management of Transamerican Steamship Corp. in 1954. Sold in 1961 to Pacific Seafarers Inc., New York and renamed Jian. Operated under the management of J. J. Georgelis Inc. Sold in 1964 to Franklin Steamship Corp. and renamed Entella. Re-registered to Liberia and operated under the management of Euclid Steamship Corp. She was scrapped at Aioi, Japan in January 1967.

== Mahlon Pitney ==
Mahlon Pitney was built by Bethlehem Fairfield Shipyard, Baltimore, Maryland. Her keel was laid on 31 December 1942. She was launched on 11 February 1943 and delivered on 26 February. She was sold for scrap in 1964, but was converted to a crane barge in 1968 and renamed Twin Harbors No. 2.

== Malcolm M. Stewart ==
Malcolm M. Stewart was built by California Shipbuilding Corporation, Terminal Island, Los Angeles, California. Her keel was laid on 13 August 1942. She was launched on 21 September and delivered on 8 October. Laid up in the Hudson River post-war, she was scrapped at Kearny, New Jersey in April 1971.

== Manasseh Cutler ==
Manasseh Cutler was built by Oregon Shipbuilding Corporation, Portland, Oregon. Her keel was laid on 12 September 1943. She was launched as Manasseh Cutler on 27 September and delivered as Samouri on 2 October. To the Ministry of War Transport (MoWT) under Lend-Lease. Operated under the management of Moss Line. She was torpedoed and sunk in the Gulf of Aden (13°13′N 55°56′E) by U-188 on 26 January 1944 whilst on a voyage from Bombay, India to New York.

== Marcus Daly ==
Marcus Daly was built by Permanente Metals Corporation. Her keel was laid on 28 June 1943. She was launched on 24 July and delivered on 5 August. Built for the WSA, she was operated under the management of Sudden & Christensen. She was damaged and set afire by a kamikaze attack in San Pedro Bay on 5 December 1944. The fire was extinguished. She was damaged in another kamikaze attack on 10 December but was repaired at San Francisco and returned to service. Laid up in reserve post-war, she was scrapped at National City, California in August 1968.

== Marcus H. Tracy ==
Marcus H. Tracy was built by New England Shipbuilding Corporation, South Portland, Maine. Her keel was laid on 12 June 1944. She was launched on 31 July and delivered on 10 August. Laid up at Mobile post-war, she was scrapped at Panama City, Florida in April 1969.

== Marcus Whitman ==
Marcus Whitman was built by Oregon Shipbuilding Corporation. Her keel was laid on 22 May 1942. She was launched on 30 June and delivered on 14 July. Built for the WSA, she was operated under the management of Matson Navigation Co. She was torpedoed, shelled and sunk in the Atlantic Ocean off Natal, Brazil (5°40′S 32°41′W) by the Italian submarine Leonardo da Vinci on 10 November 1943 whilst on a voyage from Port Sudan, Sudan to Paramaribo, Surinam.

== Margaret Brent ==
Margaret Brent was built by Bethlehem Fairfield Shipyard. Her keel was laid on 24 August 1943. She was launched on 18 September and delivered on 27 September. Built for the WSA, she was operated under the management of Luckenbach Steamship Co., Inc. Management transferred to United States Navigation Co., New York in 1946. Sold to her managers later that year and renamed Elena Mare. Re-registered to Panama. Sold in 1948 to Tatane SA Comercial Finan. Ind. Immobilaria. Re-registered to Argentina and operated under the management of J. E. Turner & Co. Sold in 1949 to Società per Azione Emanuele V. Parodi, Genoa, Italy and renamed Elena Parodi. Sold in 1961 to the Polish Government and renamed Kopalnia Kazimerz. Operated under the management of Polska Żegluga Morska. Converted to a storeship in 1967 for use at Gdynia and renamed MZ-ZP-GDY-5. Renamed Komuna Paryska in the 1970s, she was scrapped at Gdynia in 1982.

== Margaret Fuller ==
Margaret Fuller was built by California Shipbuilding Corporation. Her keel was laid on 6 February 1943. She was launched on 6 March and delivered on 23 March. She was scrapped at Coos Bay, Oregon in February 1967.

== Maria Mitchell ==
Maria Mitchell was built by Californian Shipbuilding Corporation. Her keel was laid on 4 February 1943. She was launched on 4 March and delivered on 21 March. Laid up in the James River post-war, she was scrapped at Bilbao, Spain in February 1971.

== Maria Sanford ==
Maria Sanford was built by Permanente Metals Corporation. Her keel was laid on 24 May 1943. She was launched on 20 June and delivered on 7 July. She was scrapped at Terminal Island in February 1960.

== Marie M. Meloney ==
Marie M. Meloney

Marie M. Meloney was built by Bethlehem Fairfield Shipyard. Her keel was laid on 10 August 1943. She was launched on 4 September and delivered on 12 September. She was sold for scrapping in 1965, but not scrapped due to the Vietnam War. She was scrapped at Philadelphia, Pennsylvania in April 1969.

== Marion McKinley Bovard ==
Marion McKinley Bovard was built by California Shipbuilding Corporation. Her keel was laid on 4 October 1942. She was launched on 5 November and delivered on 24 November. She was scrapped at Troon, United Kingdom in November 1960.

== Mariscal Sucre ==
Mariscal Sucre was built by Permanente Metals Corporation. Her keel was laid on 30 March 1944. She was launched on 19 April and delivered on 26 April. She was scrapped at Portland, Oregon in March 1968.

== Mark A. Davis ==
Psara

Mark A. Davis was built by Todd Houston Shipbuilding Corporation, Houston, Texas. Her keel was laid on 31 January 1945. She was launched as Mark A. Davis on 12 March and delivered as Psara on 24 March. To the Greek Government under Lend-Lease. Sold in 1947 to Demetrios & Stamatios Fafalios, Chios. Sold in 1956 to Naftiki Etaira Nea Tych, Piraeus. Sold in 1957 to Nea Thyi Maritime Co, Piraeus. She was scrapped at Osaka, Japan in May 1967.

== Mark Hanna ==
Mark Hanna was built by Oregon Shipbuilding Corporation. Her keel was laid on 20 August 1942. She was launched on 20 September and delivered on 3 October. Built for the WSA, she was operated under the management of Moore-McCormack Lines. She was torpedoed and damaged by U-510 off Paramaribo on 9 March 1943 whilst on a voyage from Bahia, Brazil to Trinidad. She was towed in to Trinidad, and the to New Orleans, where she was repaired. Laid up in reserve post-war, she was scrapped at Mobile in September 1961.

== Mark Hopkins ==
Mark Hopkins was built by Marinship Corporation, Sausalito, California. Her keel was laid on 12 November 1942. She was launched on 17 January 1943 and delivered on 20 February. She was scrapped at Terminal Island in July 1968.

== Mark Keppel ==
Mark Keppel was built by California Shipbuilding Corporation. Her keel was laid on 26 March 1943. She was launched on 18 April and delivered on 30 April. She was scrapped at Terminal Island in April 1963.

== Mark Twain ==
Mark Twain was built by Oregon Shipbuilding Corporation. Her keel was laid on 5 April 1942. She was launched on 16 May and delivered on 31 May. She was scrapped at Portland, Oregon in September 1959.

== Marshall Elliott ==
Marshall Elliott was built by North Carolina Shipbuilding Company, Wilmington, North Carolina. Her keel was laid on 20 October 1942. She was launched on 27 November and delivered on 9 December. She was scrapped at Panama City, Florida in April 1968.

== Martha Berry ==
Martha Berry was built by Southeastern Shipbuilding Corporation. Her keel was laid on 30 June 1944. She was launched on 19 August and delivered on 30 August. Laid up in the James River post-war, she was scrapped at Kearny in July 1972.

== Martha C. Thomas ==
Martha C. Thomas was built by Bethlehem Fairfield Shipyard. Her keel was laid on 21 November 1943. She was launched as Martha C. Thomas on 14 December and delivered as Samharle on 23 December. To the MoWT under Lend-Lease. Operated under the management of A. Holt & Co. Sold in 1947 to Ocean Steamship Co., Liverpool and renamed Troilus. Sold in 1950 to Compania de Navigation San Agustin, Panama and renamed Green River. Re-registered to Liberia and operated under the management of Sociètè d'Etudes et de Gestion. She was scrapped at Osaka in 1963.

== Martin Behrman ==
Martin Behrman was built by Delta Shipbuilding Company, New Orleans, Louisiana. Her keel was laid on 25 October 1944. She was launched on 4 December and delivered on 21 December. She was scrapped at Portland, Oregon in June 1965.

== Martin Johnson ==
Martin Johnson was built by California Shipbuilding Corporation. Her keel was laid on 17 March 1944. She was launched on 14 April and delivered on 4 May. Built for the WSA, she was operated under the management of Shepard Steamship Co. Sold in 1947 to Dalmore Corp., New York and renamed Panamolga. Sold later that year to Compania Navigation Dalmatica. Re-registered to Panama and operated under the management of her former owners. Management transferred to Martin Management Trust in 1962. Sold in 1965 to Babu Shipping Inc. and renamed Sevilliana. Re-registered to Liberia and operated under the management of Constellation Maritime Agencies. Sold in 1966 to Society Armamente Eureka Internationale and renamed Eureka. Re-registered to Panama and operated under the management of Oceanic International Co. She was scrapped at La Spezia in July 1969.

== Martin Van Buren ==
Martin Van Buren was built by Bethlehem Fairfield Shipyard. Her keel was laid on 30 November 1943. She was launched on 21 December and delivered on 31 December. Built for the WSA, she was operated under the management of West India Steamship co. She was torpedoed and damaged off Halifax, Dominion of Canada (44°28′N 63°28′W) by U-1232 on 14 January 1945 whilst on a voyage from Boston, Massachusetts to Halifax. Although taken in tow, the tow broke and she ran aground on the Lobster Claw Ledge, off the Sambro Lightship. Declared a constructive total loss, she was scrapped in situ in 1950.

== Mary A. Livermore ==
Mary A. Livermore was built by Permanente Metals Corporation. Her keel was laid on 4 November 1943. She was launched on 22 November and delivered on 30 November. Built for the WSA, she was operated under the management of Isthmian Steamship Company. Severely damaged in a kamikaze attack off Okinawa, Japan on 27 May 1945. Repaired at San Francisco and returned to service. Management transferred to Wessel, Duval & Co. in 1946. Sold in 1947 to Compania Internacional de Vapores, Panama and renamed Myrto. Re-registered to Honduras and operated under the management of North American Shipping Co. Converted to a tanker by Bethlehem Steel Co., Baltimore in May 1948. converted to a cargo ship by Howaldtswerke, Hamburg, West Germany in 1954. She ran out of fuel in the Atlantic Ocean off Bermuda on 14 January 1955. The American tanker White River went to her aid. Management transferred to Transoceanic Marine Inc. in 1956. Sold in 1960 to Arista Compania de Vapores, Panama and renamed World Leader. Re-registered to Liberia and operated under the management of Niarchos Ltd. Sold in 1963 to Loyal Navigation Co., Panama and renamed Concord. Remaining under the Liberian flag and operated under the management of China Marine Investment Co. Renamed Oceanic Explorer in 1964. Renamed Pacmoon in 1967 for delivery voyage from Saigon, Vietnam to Kaohsiung, Taiwan for scrapping. She was scrapped in March 1968.

== Mary Ashley Townsend ==
Mary Ashley Townsend was a tanker built by Delta Shipbuilding Company. Her keel was laid on 3 June 1943. She was launched on 25 July and delivered on 22 September. Built for the WSA, she was operated under the management of International Freighting Corp. Sold in 1948 to Hess Inc., Perth Amboy, New Jersey and renamed David T. Wilentz. Sold in 1955 to Seatankers Inc. and renamed Sweetville. Re-registered to Liberia. Converted to a cargo ship at Kure in 1956. Lengthened to 511 feet 6 inches (155.91 m), now 8,602 GRT. Sold in 1957 to Argyll Shipping Co., Hamilton, Bermuda and renamed Berkshire. Re-registered to the United Kingdom. Sold in 1964 to Delos Maritime Co. and renamed Delos Glory. Re-registered to Liberia and operated under the management of Pacific Steamship Agency. She was scrapped at Kaohsiungg in 1968.

== Mary Austin ==
Mary Austin was built by Todd Houston Shipbuilding Corporation. Her keel was laid on 13 May 1943. She was launched on 19 June and delivered on 30 June. Laid up in the James River post-war, she was scrapped at Gandia, Spain in September 1972.

== Mary Ball ==
Mary Ball was a tank transport built by J. A. Jones Construction Company, Panama City, Florida. Her keel was laid on 20 July 1943. She was launched on 17 October and delivered on 30 November. Laid up at Mobile post-war, she was scrapped at Panama City, Florida in April 1972.

== Mary Bickerdyke ==
Mary Bickerdyke was Permanente Metals Corporation. Her keel was laid on 5 October 1943. She was launched on 27 October and delivered on 9 November. Built for the WSA, she was operated under the management of Seas Shipping Co. Sold in 1946 to Atlantic Maritime Co. and renamed Atlantic Ocean. Re-registered to Panama and operated under the management of Boyd, Weir & Sewell Inc. Management transferred to Livanos & Co. in 1948. She ran aground off Alexandria, Egypt on 28 March 1948 whilst on a voyage from Iquique, Peru to Alexandria. She was refloated on 1 April. Although declared a constructive total loss, she was repaired. Sold in 1950 to Navegaceon Maritima Panama. Puerto Cortés, Honduras. Sold in 1951 to Atlantic Cargo Carriers Ltd. Re-registered to Liberia and operated under the management of Livanos & Co. Management transferred to Maritime Brokers Inc. in 1952. Sold in 1953 to Atlantic Freighters Ltd. Remaining under the Liberian flag and operated under the management of Livanos Ltd. Sold in 1961 to United White Shipping Co. and renamed White Mountain, remaining under the same flag and manager. Collided with the British cargo ship Funabashi 9 nautical miles (17 km) off Singapore (1°19′N 104°18′E) on 16 February 1966 whilst on a voyage from Bangkok, Thailand to Colombo, Ceylon. She capsized and sank.

== Mary Cassat ==
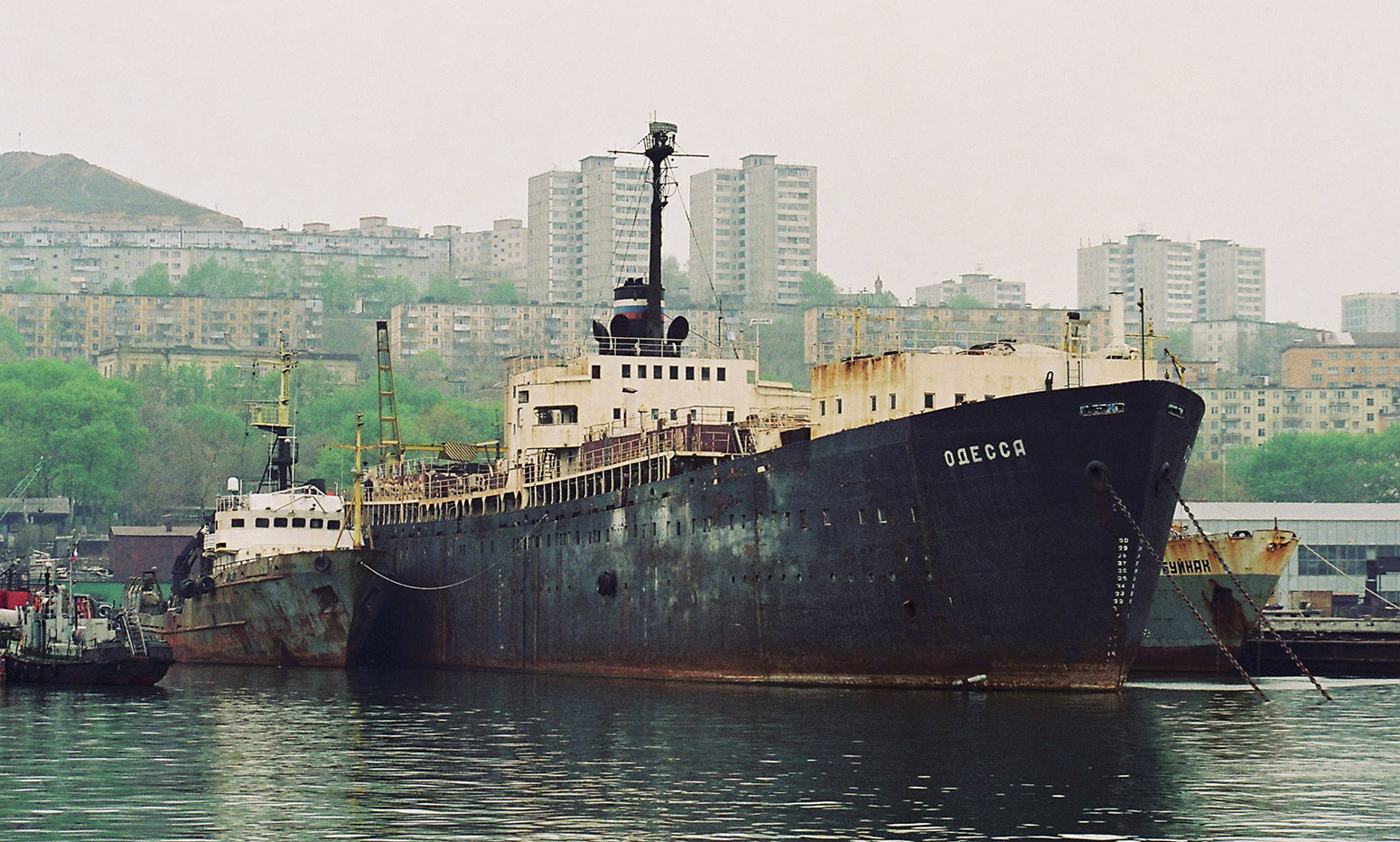
Odessa at Vladivostok, May 2003

Mary Cassat was built by Permanente Metals Corporation. Her keel was laid on 17 April 1943. She was launched on 16 May and delivered on 31 May. To the Soviet Union and renamed Odessa. To Far Eastern Shipping Company, Vladivostok in 1977. To the Ministry of Fisheries in 1978. Used as a storeship. Still in use in May 2003.

== Mary Cullom Kimbro ==
Mary Cullom Kimbro was a boxed aircraft transport built by J. A. Jones Construction Company, Panama City. Her keel was laid on 21 February 1945. She was launched on 6 April and delivered on 21 April. To the United States Army in 1945, renamed Corporal Eric C. Gibson and used as a repair ship. Scuttled in the Atlantic Ocean (39°37′N 70°57′W) with a cargo of obsolete military equipment on 16 June 1967.

== Mary E. Kinney ==
Mary E. Kinney was built by Oregon Shipbuilding Corporation. Her keel was laid on 14 December 1943. She was launched on 29 December and delivered on 8 January 1944. She was dismantled at Philadelphia in 1963 for use as a storage tank.

== Mary Lyon ==
Mary Lyon was built by New England Shipbuilding Corporation. Her keel was laid on 8 March 1943. She was launched on 3 May and delivered on 21 May. Built for the WSA, she was operated under the management of Cosmopolitan Shipping Co. Sold in 1947 to Theofano Maritime Co. and renamed Nestos. Re-registered to Greece and operated under the management of Livanos. Sold in 1961 to Opca Polvidba & Pomorsko, Split, Yugoslavia and renamed Kastela. Sold in 1962 to Jadranska Slobodna Plovidba, Split. Operated under the management of Adriatic Tramp Shipping. She sprang a leak in pack ice in the Hudson Strait (63°39′N 77°20′W) on 3 August 1963 whilst on a voyage from Churchill, Canada to a British port and was abandoned. She sank 500 nautical miles (930 km) north north east of Churchill on 4 August.

== Mary M. Dodge ==
Mary M. Dodge was built by Permanente Metals Corporation. Her keel was laid on 4 August 1943. She was launched on 25 August and delivered on 5 September. Built for the WSA, she was operated under the management of South Atlantic Steamship Line. To the Dutch Government in 1947 and renamed Molengraaf. Sold later that year to Oranje Linie and renamed Prins Willem II. Operated under the management of Anthony Veder & Co. Sold in 1950 to Maatschappij Zeetransport N.V., remaining under the same management. Sold in 1953 to Claymore Shipping Co., Cardiff, United Kingdom and renamed Dayrose. Sold in 1956 to Society de Navigation Albion, Panama and renamed Aretus. Re-registered to Liberia and operated under the management of Goulandris Ltd. Sold in 1963 to Phoebus D. Kyprianou, Beirut, Lebanon and renamed Dimos. She was scrapped at Whampoa Dock in December 1969.

== Mary Patten ==
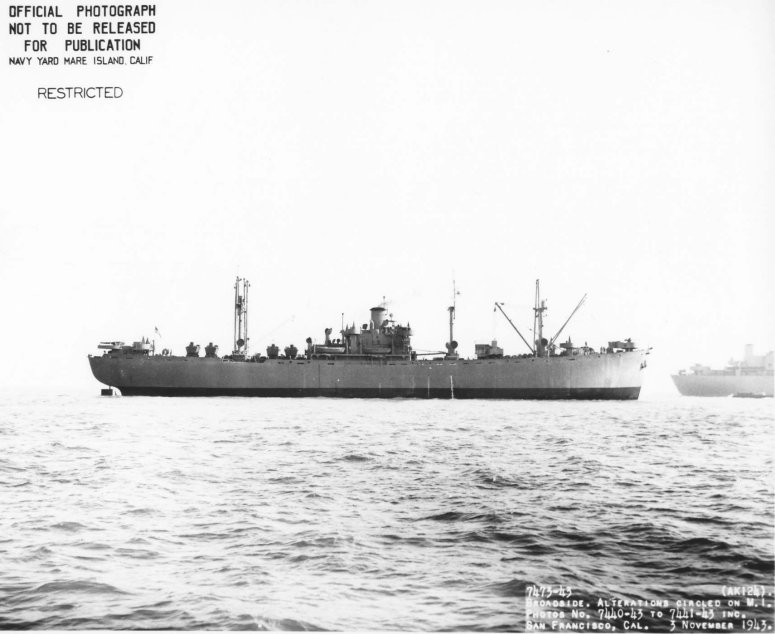
USS Azimech

Mary Patten was built by Permanente Metals Corporation. Her keel was laid on 21 July 1943. She was launched on 11 August and delivered on 22 August. To the United States Navy in October 1943 and renamed Azimech. Returned to the WSA in December 1945 and renamed Mary Patten. Laid up in the James River, she was sold to shipbreakers in Castellón de la Plana, Spain in October 1972.

== Mary Pickersgill ==
Mary Pickersgill was built by Bethlehem Fairfield Shipyard. Her keel was laid on 27 May 1944. She was launched on 29 June and delivered on 11 July. Built for the WSA, she was operated under the management of Parry Navigation Co. Management transferred to Lykes Brothers Steamship Company in 1946. Sold in 1947 to Atlantic Ocean Transport Corp., New York and renamed Ocean Traveler. Sold in 1948 to Weyerhaeuser Steamship Co., Newark, New Jersey and renamed W. H. Peabody. Sold in 1969 to Reliance Carriers and renamed Reliance Prosperity. Re-registered to Panama and operated under the management of Hongkong Maritime Co. She was scrapped at Kaohsiung in May 1971.

== Mary Walker ==
Mary Walker was built by Permanente Metals Corporation. Her keel was laid on 30 October 1943. She was launched on 18 November and delivered on 26 November. Built for the WSA, she was operated under the management of Weyerhaeuser Steamship Co. Sold in 1947 to Petros N. Nomikos, Piraeus and renamed Loula Nomikos. Sold in 1959 to Southern Steamships Ltd., Durban, South Africa, and renamed President Hoffman. Re-registered to the United Kingdom. Re-registered to the Union of South Africa in 1960. She was scrapped at Osaka in October 1963.

== Mary Wilkins Freeman ==
Mary Wilkins Freeman was built by New England Shipbuilding Corporation. Her keel was laid on 1 October 1943. She was launched on 13 November and delivered on 24 November. Built for the WSA, she was operated under the management of Boland & Cornelius. To the United States War Department in 1946. Sold in 1946 to Raggruppamento Armatore Fratelli Grimbaldi, Naples, Italy and renamed Orione. Sold in 1961 to Sicula Oceanica SpA, Palermo, Sicily, Italy. She was scrapped at La Spezia in February 1966.

== Masbate ==
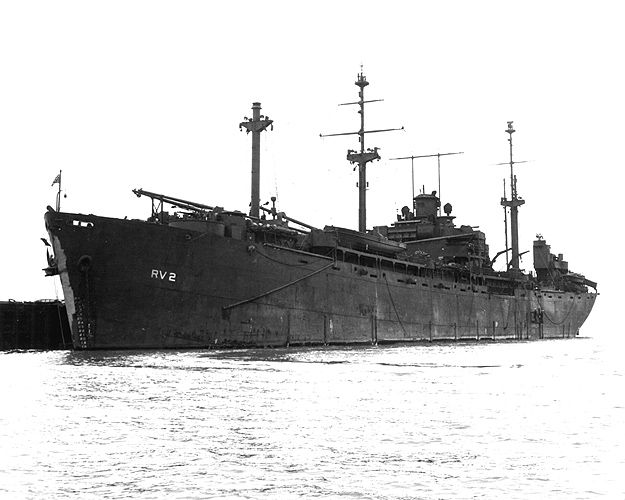
USS Webster

Masbate was built by Bethlehem Fairfield Shipyard. Her keel was laid on 1 July 1944. She was launched as Masbate on 5 August and delivered as Webster on 26 August. Built for the United States Navy. Returned to WSA in June 1946 and laid up in the James River. She was scuttled off Cape Henry, Virginia in 1977.

== Mason L. Weems ==
Mason L. Weems was a tanker built by Delta Shipbuilding Company. Her keel was laid as Mason L. Weems on 1 November 1943. She was launched as Moose on 17 December and delivered to the United States Navy on 27 January 1944. Returned to the WSA in April 1946 and renamed Mason L. Weems. Sold in 1948 to Tramp Shipping & Oil Transportation Corp., New York and renamed Yankee Pioneer. Converted to a cargo ship at Brooklyn, New York in 1949. Sold in 1951 to Weyerhaeuser Steamship Co. and renamed W. L. McCormick. Sold in 1961 to Seafarers Inc. and renamed Anji. Operated under the management of J. J. Georgelis Inc. She was laid up at Hong Kong in 1964. She was driven ashore in a typhoon on 5 September 1964. Refloated on 24 November. She was scrapped at Hong Kong in March 1965.

== Matthew B. Brady ==
Matthew B. Brady was built by Permanente Metals Corporation. Her keel was laid on 23 April 1943. She was launched on 18 May and delivered on 30 May. She was scrapped at Port Glasgow, United Kingdom in September 1960.

== Matthew Brush ==
Matthew Brush was built by Bethlehem Fairfield Shipyard. Her keel was laid on 18 July 1943. She was launched as Matthew Brush on 14 August and delivered as Samoa on 23 August. To the MoWT under Lend-Lease. Operated under the management of A. Holt & Co. Sold in 1947 to China Mutual Steam Navigation Co. and renamed Eurymedon. Remaining under the same management. Sold in 1952 to Glen Line Ltd., London and renamed Glenlogan. Sold in 1957 to Blue Funnel Line and renamed Eurymedon. Operated under the management of A. Holt & Co. Sold in 1958 to Etolika Compania Navigation, Panama and renamed Angelos. Re-registered to Costa Rica and operated under the management of A. Luisi Ltd. Re-registered to Greece in 1959. Sold in 1964 to Michel A. Araktingi and renamed Mimosa. Re-registered to Lebanon and operated under the management of Midsutra Shipping Ltd. Sold in 1966 to Alplata Shipping Ltd. and renamed Alplata. Re-registered to Liberia and operated under the management of Flemar Ltd. Sold in 1967 to Maria de Lourdes Shipping Ltd. and renamed Anka. Re-registered to Cyprus and operated under the management of Carapanayoti & Co. Management transferred to Shipping & Produce Co. in 1968. She was scrapped at Bilbao in October 1971.

== Matthew J. O'Brien ==
Matthew J. O'Brien was built by Todd Houston Shipbuilding Corporation. Her keel was laid on 12 October 1943. She was launched on 20 November and delivered on 30 November. She was scrapped at Panama City, Florida in July 1966.

== Matthew Lyon ==
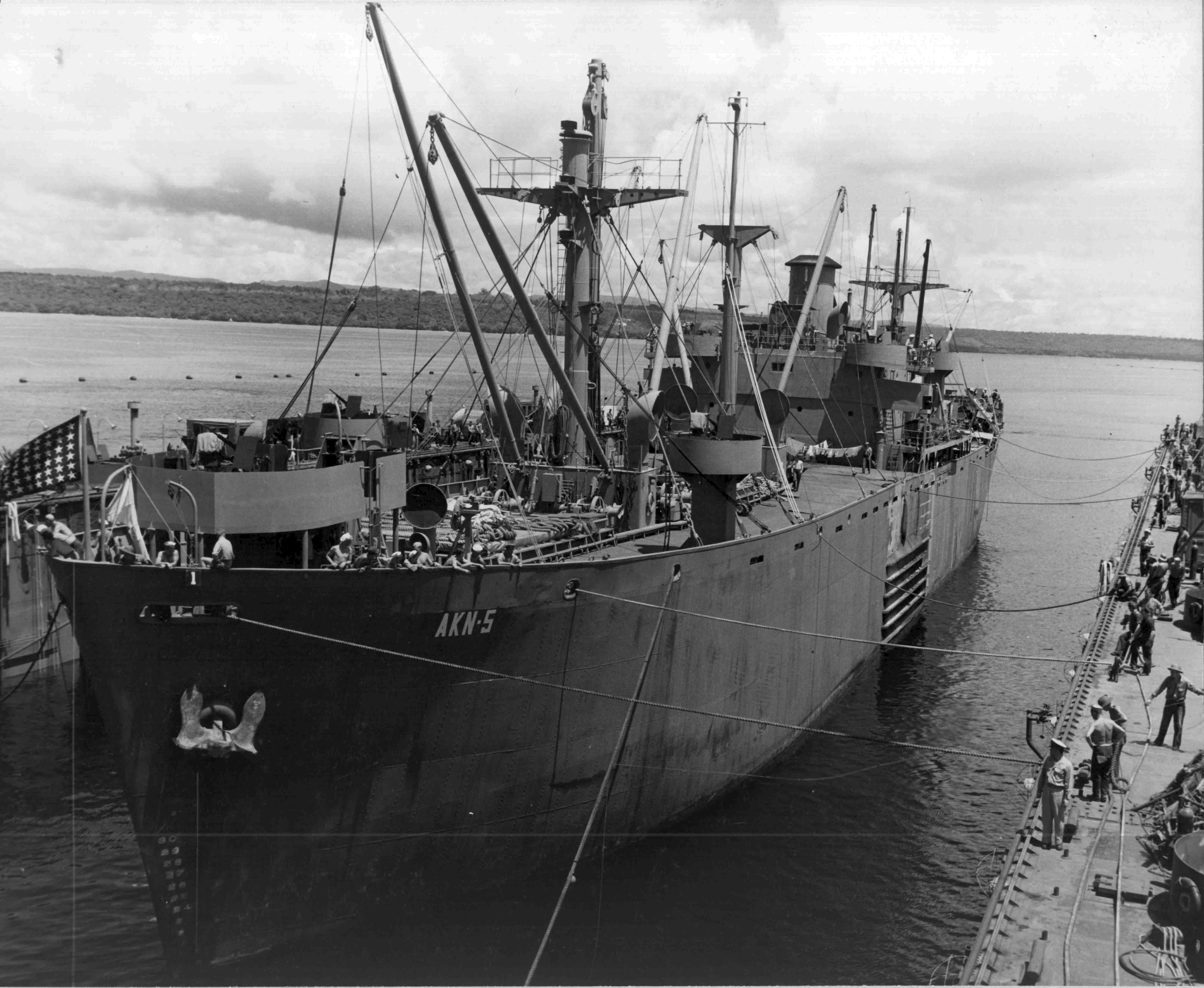
USS Zebra

Matthew Lyon was built by Permanente Metals Corporation. Her keel was laid on 18 March 1943. She was launched on 11 April and delivered on 26 April. Built for the WSA, she was operated under the management of Dichmann, Wright & Pugh. Torpedoed and damaged in the Pacific Ocean (22°30′S 166°30′E) by I-11 on 11 August 1943. She arrived at Espiritu Santo several days later. To the United States Navy in October, renamed Zebra and used as a hulk. Repaired in February 1944. Returned to WSA in January 1946 and renamed Matthew Lyon. Laid up in the James River, she was scrapped at Panama City, Florida in November 1972.

== Matthew Maury ==
Matthew Maury was built by Todd Houston Shipbuilding Corporation. Her keel was laid on 25 July 1941. She was launched on 29 April 1942 and delivered on 17 June. Built for the WSA, she was operated under the management of Lykes Brothers Steamship Company. Torpedoed and damaged in the Mediterranean Sea off Bougie, Algeria by U-371 on 10 July 1943 whilst on a voyage from Philippeville to Bougie. She was towed in to Bougie, then to Algiers and Gibraltar, where temporary repairs were made. She sailed to Norfolk, Virginia for permanent repairs. Laid up in reserve post-war, she was scrapped at Terminal Island in March 1961.

== Matthew P. Deady ==
Matthew P. Deady was built by Oregon Shipbuilding Corporation. Her keel was laid on 11 May 1942. She was launched on 23 June and delivered on 6 July. Built for the WSA, she was operated under the management of American-Hawaiian Steamship Company. She was set afire in a kamikaze attack off Leyte, Philippines on 2 November 1944 whilst on a voyage from New Guinea to Leyte. The fire was extinguished and she put in to Hollandia before sailing to San Francisco for repairs. Laid up in reserve post-war, she was scrapped at Panama City, Florida in June 1961.

== Matthew Sheehan ==
Matthew Sheehan was built by New England Shipbuilding Corporation. Her keel was laid on 23 September 1944. She was launched on 4 November and delivered on 16 November. Laid up in the James River post-war, she was scrapped at Castellón de la Plana in April 1972.

== Matthew T. Goldsboro ==
Matthew T. Goldsboro was built by North Carolina Shipbuilding Company. Her keel was laid on 13 February 1943. She was launched on 15 March and delivered on 22 March. She was scrapped at Kearny in December 1969.

== Matthew Thornton ==
Matthew Thornton was built by Permanente Metals Corporation. Her keel was laid on 30 June 1942. She was launched on 12 August and delivered on 29 August. Laid up at Beaumont, Texas post war, she was scrapped at Brownsville, Texas in May 1971.

== Matt W. Ransom ==
Matt W. Ransom was built by North Carolina Shipbuilding Company. Her keel was laid on 9 January 1943. She was launched on 6 February and delivered on 16 February. Built for the WSA, she was operated under the management of Smith & Johnson Co. She was torpedoed and damaged off Casablanca, Morocco by U-117 on 11 April 1943. She put in to Gibraltar and then sailed to the United States for temporary repairs. Scuttled on 8 June 1944 as part of Gooseberry A, off Verreville, France. Abandoned as a total loss on 16 July after storm damage between 19 and 22 June.

== Mayo Brothers ==
Mayo Brothers was built by Delta Shipbuilding Company. Her keel was laid on 28 Ocgtober 1942. She was launched on 14 December 1942 and delivered on 31 December. She was scrapped at Panama City, Florida in January 1965.

== M. E. Comerford ==
M. E. Comerford was built by J. A. Jones Construction Company, Brunswick, Georgia. Her keel was laid on 10 November 1944. She was launched on 12 December and delivered on 20 December. Built for the WSA, she was operated under the management of Merchants & Miners Transportation Co. She was scrapped at Portland, Oregon in March 1970.

== Mello Franco ==
Mello Franco was built by Permanente Metals Corporation. Her keel was laid on 18 April 1944. She was launched on 6 May and delivered on 13 May. Built for the WSA, she was operated under the management of Interocean Steamship Corporation. Management transferred to American Pacific Steamship Co. in 1946. To the French Government later that year and renamed Bayeux. Operated under the management of Compagnie Générale Transatlantique. Sold in 1965 to Overseas Transportation Co., Lugano, Switzerland and renamed Sinoe. Re-registered to Liberia. She was scrapped at Castellón de la Plana in May 1969.

== Melucta ==
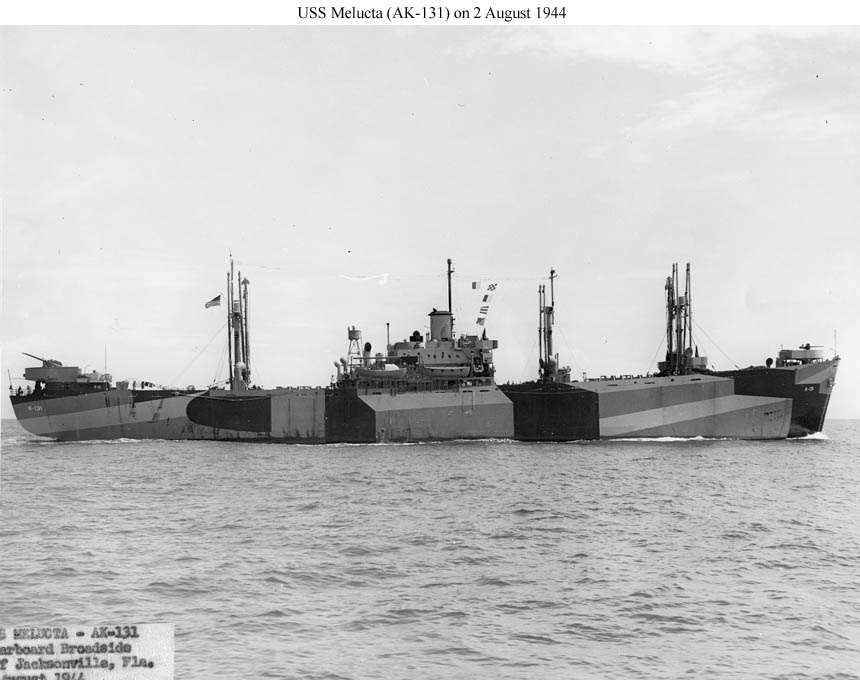
USS Melucta

Melucta was built by St. Johns River Shipbuilding Company, Jacksonville, Florida. Her keel was laid on 21 January 1944. She was launched as Thomas A. McGinley on 20 March and delivered to the United States Navy as Melucta on 31 March. Converted for naval use by Gibbs Engine Co., Jacksonville. Returned to WSA in December 1945 and renamed Thomas A. McGinley. Laid up in the James River post-war, she was scrapped at Bilbao in August 1970.

== Melvil Dewey ==
Melvil Dewey was built by Bethlehem Fairfield Shipyard. Her keel was laid on 26 November 1943. She was launched as Melvil Dewey on 18 December and delivered as Samsacola on 29 December. To the MoWT under Lend-Lease. Operated under the management of S. & J. Thompson Ltd. Sold in 1947 to Silver Line Ltd., London and renamed Sivercedar. Sold in 1949 to William Thompson & Co., Edinburgh and renamed Benwyvis. She collided with the Spanish steamship Guecho in the English Channel 4 nautical miles (7.4 km) south east of Dover, United Kingdom on 21 March 1952. Sold in 1955 to Rio del Castro Compania Armamente, Panama and renamed Linda. Re-registered to Liberia and operated under the management of Global Shipping Co. Sold in 1958 to District Shipping Co., Panama and renamed Agia Irene. Remaining under the Liberian flag and operated under the management of Triton Shipping Co. Re-registered to Greece in 1961. Management transferred to Dynamic Shipping Co. in 1962. Sold in 1965 to Transocean Shipping Corp. and renamed Angelina. Remaining under the Liberian flag and operated under the management of Universal Marine Service Co. She caught fire 85 nautical miles (157 km) east north east of Madras, India (14°00′N 81°26′E) on 31 July 1967 whilst on a voyage from Vishakpatnam to Madras and was abandoned. She was towed in to Madras on 4 August. Subsequently towed to Singapore, where she was declared a constructive total loss. She was scrapped there.

== Melville E. Stone ==
Melville E. Stone was built by Permanente Metals Corporation. Her keel was laid on 2 July 1943. She was launched on 24 July and delivered on 5 August. Built for the WSA, she was operated under the management of Norton Lilly & Co. She was torpedoed and sunk by U-516 north west of Cristóbal, Canal Zone (10°36′N 80°19′W) on 24 November 1943 whilst on a voyage from Antofagasta, Chile to New York.

== Melville Jacoby ==
Melville Jacoby was built by Walsh-Kaiser Company, Providence, Rhode Island. Her keel was laid on 27 October 1943. She was launched on 18 January 1944 and delivered on 31 March. Built for the WSA, she was operated under the management of Wilmore Steamships Inc. Sold in 1947 to Compania Levante de Vapores, Panama and renamed Victoria. Sold in 1950 to Dominica Compania Navigation, Panama and renamed North Queen. Operated under the management of Freighters & Tankers Agency. Sold in 1953 to Parnasco Compania Navigation, Panama and renamed Dominator. Operated under the management of D. Pateras Ltd. She ran aground off Palos Verdes Point, California (33°46′N 118°26′W) on 13 March 1961 whilst on a voyage from Vancouver, Washington to Algiers. She was declared a constructive total loss. Her wreck was subsequently sold for scrapping.

== Melville W. Fuller ==
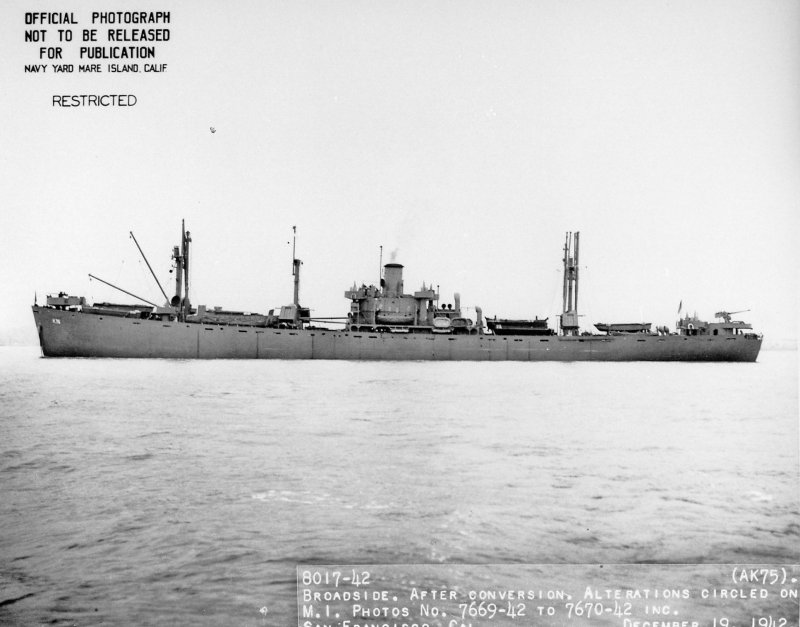
USS Cassiopea

Melville W. Fuller was built by Permanente Metals Corporation. Her keel was laid on 13 October 1942. She was launched on 15 November and delivered on 27 November. To the United States Navy and renamed Cassiopea. Returned to USMC in November 1945 and renamed Melville W. Fuller. Laid up in the James River. To United States Navy in June 1961. Torpedoed and sunk 100 nautical miles (190 km) west of Norfolk, Virginia by USS Cutlass on 28 June 1961 during tests of new torpedoes.

== Mercy Warren ==
Mercy Warren was built by New England Shipbuilding Corporation. Her keel was laid on 11 October 1943. She was launched on 24 November and delivered on 10 December. Laid up in the Hudson River post-war, she was scrapped at Kearny in February 1971.

== Meriwether Lewis ==
Meriwether Lewis was built by Oregon Shipbuilding Corporation. Her keel was laid on 19 May 1941. She was launched on 19 October and delivered on 27 January 1942. Built for the WSA, she was operated under the management of American Mail Line. She was torpedoed and sunk in the Atlantic Ocean (62°10′N 28°25′W) by U-162 on 2 March 1943 whilst on a voyage from New York to a British port.

== Merrimac Seam ==
Merrimac Seam was a collier built by Delta Shipbuilding Company. Her keel was laid on 12 January 1945. She was launched on 13 March and delivered on 8 May. Built for the WSA, she was operated under the management of Wellhart Steamship Co. Management transferred to Eastern Gas & Fuel Associates in 1946, then to Sprague Steamship Co. in 1947. Sold in 1949 to Marine Navigation Co., New York and renamed Marine Shipper Sold later that year to Marine Interests Corp. Sold in 1952 to Marine Navigation Co. Placed under the management of Marine Transport Lines in 1962. Returned to the United States Government in 1966 and laid up at Mobile. She was scrapped at New Orleans in November 1972.

== Meyer Lissner ==
Meyer Lissner was built by California Shipbuilding Corporation. Her keel was laid on 9 November 1943. She was launched on 4 December and delivered on 23 December. Built for the WSA, she was operated under the management of Waterman Steamship Corp. To the French Government in 1947 and renamed Trun. Operated under the management of Compagnie Générale Transatlantique. Sold in 1947 to Proodos Compania Navigation, Panama and renamed Armonia. Re-registered to Lebanon and operated under the management of Tharros Shipping Co. Management transferred to Pegasus Ocean Services in 1964. She was scrapped at Yokosuka, Japan in October 1968.

== Meyer London ==
Meyer London was built by Bethlehem Fairfield Shipyard. Her keel was laid on 27 December 1943. She was launched on 24 January 1944 and delivered on 4 February. Built for the WSA, she was operated under the management of T. J. Stevenson & Co. She was torpedoed and sunk off Derna, Libya (32°15′N 23°00′E) by U-407 on 16 April 1944 whilst on a voyage from Philadelphia to Abadan, Iran.

== M. H. De Young ==
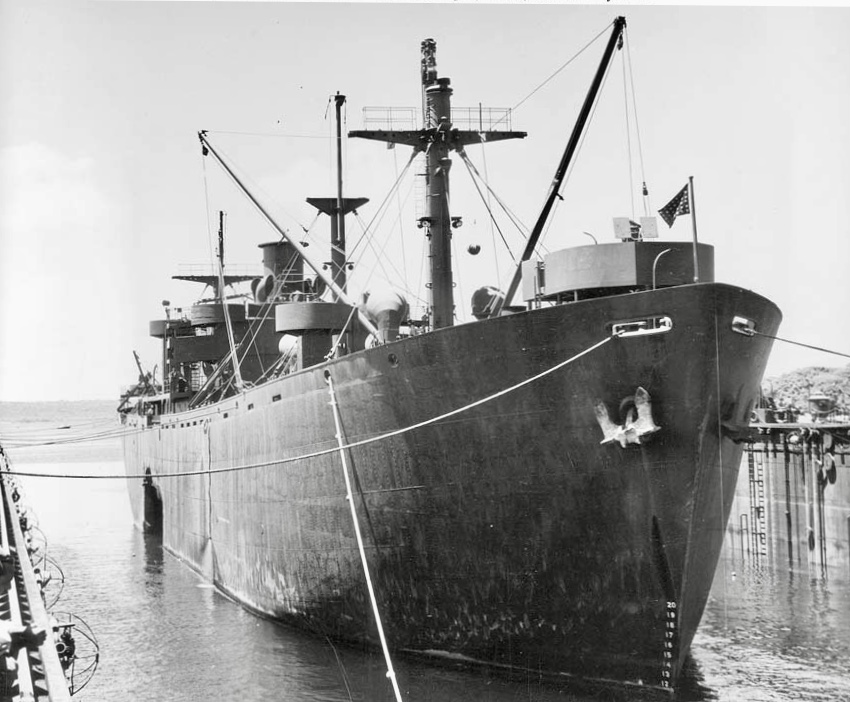
USS Antelope

M. H. De Young was built by Permanente Metals Corporation, Richmond, California. Her keel was laid on 15 June 1943. She was launched on 6 July and delivered on 19 July. Built for the WSA, she was operated under the management of R. A. Nicol & Co. Torpedoed and damaged in the Pacific Ocean (21°50′S 171°10′E) by I-19 on 14 August 1943 whilst on a voyage from Port Hueneme, California to Espiritu Santo, New Hebrides. Her engine room was destroyed. She was transferred to the United States Navy in May 1944 and renamed Antelope. Used as a storage hulk. To the United States Maritime Commission (USMC) in 1946 and renamed M. H. De Young. Sold to Chinese shipbreakers in 1948. She departed from Hong Kong for Shanghai, China under tow on 23 August 1950 and was subsequently scrapped.

== Miaoulis ==
Miaoulis was built by New England Shipbuilding Corporation. Her keel was laid on 20 April 1944. She was launched as Lot Morrill on 7 June and delivered as Miaoulis on 23 June. To the Greek Government under Lend-Lease. Sold in 1946 to Pateras & Mavrophillipas Bros., Athens and renamed Mariam. Operated under the management of Lymas & Lemas. Sold in 1949 to Irinico Steamship Co., Piraeus. Operated under the management of Triton Shipping Co. Sold in 1960 to Asterion Shipping Co., Piraeus and renamed Ariston. Operated under the management of Lyras Bros. She was scrapped at Sakai, Japan in October 1967.

== Michael Anagnos ==
Michael Anagnos was built by New England Shipbuilding Corporation. Her keel was laid on 31 July 1944. She was launched on 18 September and delivered on 6 October. To the Greek Government under Lend-Lease. Sold in 1946 to Hellenic Lines Ltd., Piraeus and New York, remaining under the Greek flag. Renamed Grigorios C. III in 1947. Placed under the management of P. G. Callimanopulos in 1953. Laid up at Piraeus in 1972, she arrived at Split for scrapping in March 1973.

== Michael Casey ==
Michael Casey was built by Permanente Metals Corporation. Her keel was laid on 15 August 1943. She was launched on 9 September and delivered on 18 September. Built for the WSA, she was operated under the management of American President Lines. Sold in 1946 to Stratis G. Andreadis, Chios and Athens and renamed Georgios F. Andreadis. Laid up at Eleusis on 10 January 1971, she was scrapped at Split in 1985.

== Michael C. Kerr ==
Michael C. Kerr was built by Permanente Metals Corporation. Her keel was laid on 13 October 1943. She was launched on 30 October and delivered on 15 November. She was scrapped at New Orleans in June 1969.

== Michael De Kovats ==
Michael De Kovats was built by St. Johns River Shipbuilding Company. Her keel was laid on 9 August 1944. She was launched on 16 September and delivered on 27 September. Laid up at Mobile post-war, she was scrapped there in March 1972.

== Michael James Monohan ==
Michael James Monohan was a boxed aircraft transport built by J. A. Jones Construction Company, Panama City. Her keel was laid on 22 November 1944. She was launched on 4 January 1945 and delivered on 17 January. To the United States Navy in 1967. Scuttled in the Atlantic Ocean on 30 April 1967 with a cargo of obsolete Polaris missile motors.

== Michael J. Owens ==
Michael J. Owens was built by Todd Houston Shipbuilding Corporation. Her keel was laid on 3 August 1944. She was launched on 9 September and delivered on 23 September. Built for the WSA, she was operated under the management of Polarus Steamship Co., New York. Sold to her managers in 1949 and renamed Polarus Trader. Sold in 1950 to A. L. Burbank & Co., New York and renamed Burco Trader. Sold in 1960 to Tiger Steamships Ltd and renamed Montego Sun. Operated under the management of Standard Marine Ltd. Sold in 1961 to Sky Shipping Ltd. and renamed Diskos. Re-registered to Greece, remaining under the same management. She ran aground at Panama City, Florida on 2 November 1961 whilst on a voyage from Panama City to Kobe. She was refloated and resumed her voyage, but was damaged in severe weather. She was scrapped at Hirao, Japan in May 1962.

== Michael J. Stone ==
Michael J. Stone was built by Todd Houston Shipbuilding Corporation. Her keel was laid on 23 October 1941. She was launched on 22 May 1942 and delivered on 30 June. Built for the WSA, she was operated under the management of Lykes Brothers Steamship Company. She was torpedoed and damaged 25 nautical miles (46 km) off Gibraltar by U-300 on 17 February 1945 whilst on a voyage from Norfolk, Virginia to Calcutta, India. She was towed in to Gibraltar. Subsequently repaired and returned to service. Laid up post-war, she was scrapped at Baltimore in March 1960.

== Michael Moran ==
Michael Moran was built by New England Shipbuilding Corporation. Her keel was laid on 28 June 1944. She was launched on 16 August and delivered on 28 August. Laid up in reserve post-war. To the United States Navy in 1958. Used as a target ship. Scuttled at sea with a cargo of obsolete chemical ammunition on 21 June 1958.

== Michael Pupin ==
Michael Pupin was built by Permanente Metals Corporation. Her keel was laid on 18 April 1943. She was launched on 19 May and delivered on 5 June. She was scrapped at Philadelphia in March 1962.

== Midwest Farmer ==
Midwest Farmer was built by Oregon Shipbuilding Corporation. Her keel was laid on 26 August 1943. She was launched on 10 September and delivered on 18 September. She was scrapped at Baltimore in May 1961.

== Miguel Hidalgo ==
Miguel Hidalgo was built by California Shipbuilding Corporation. Her keel was laid on 19 March 1943. She was launched on 14 April and delivered on 27 April. She was scrapped at Terminal Island in 1958.

== Milan R. Stefanik ==
Milan R. Stefanik was built by Bethlehem Fairfield Shipyard. Her keel was laid on 26 August 1944. She was launched on 27 September and delivered on 14 October. Built for the WSA, she was operated under the management of Merchants & Miners Transportation Co. Management transferred to American Pacific Steamship Co., Los Angeles in 1946. Sold to her managers in 1947 and renamed Ampac Los Angeles. Sold in 1949 to North American Shipping & Trading Co., New York and renamed Mohican. Sold in 1956 to Mohican Corp. Reflagged to Liberia and operated under the management of Transoceanic Marine Ltd. Sold later that year to World Lore Corp. and renamed World Lore, remaining under the same flag and managers. Sold in 1958 to Eltraders Inc. and renamed Kali L. Operated under the management of Seres Shipping Inc. Management transferred to Ceres Shipping Inc in 1959. She ran aground at Nojima Saki, Japan (34°53′N 139°50′E) on 18 November 1964 whilst on a voyage from Iloilo, Philippines to New Orleans. She was refloated on 14 December and towed in to Yokosuka. Declared a constructive total loss, she was scrapped there in March 1965.

== Millen Griffith ==
Millen Griffith was built by Permanente Metals Corporation. Her keel was laid on 26 November 1943. She was launched on 18 December and delivered on 28 December. She was scrapped at Oakland in 1958.

== Milton B. Medary ==
Milton B. Medary was built by Delta Shipbuilding Corporation. Her keel was laid on 17 May 1944. She was launched on 8 July and delivered on 26 August. She was scrapped at Philadelphia in November 1966.

== Milton H. Smith ==
Milton H. Smith was built by Delta Shipbuilding Corporation. Her keel was laid on 22 June 1944. She was launched on 31 July and delivered on 12 September. Laid up in the James River post-war, she was scrapped at Castellón de la Plana in September 1972.

== Milton J. Foreman ==
Milton J. Foreman was built by Southeastern Shipbuilding Corporation. Her keel was laid on 8 September 1944. She was launched on 21 October and delivered on 4 November. Built for the WSA, she was operated under the management of International Freighting corp. Management transferred to Sword Line in 1946. Laid up in the Hudson River in 1948, she was sold in 1951 to Veritas Steamship Co., New York and renamed Shinnecock Bay. Placed under the management of Tankship Management Corp. in 1953. Management transferred to Cargo & Tankships Management Corp., New York in 1958. Sold to her managers in 1960 and renamed Mount Shasta. Sold in 1963 to Jayanti Shipping Co., Bombay and London and renamed Shankara Jayanti. Reflagged to India. She was scrapped at Bombay in July 1965.

== Mindanao ==
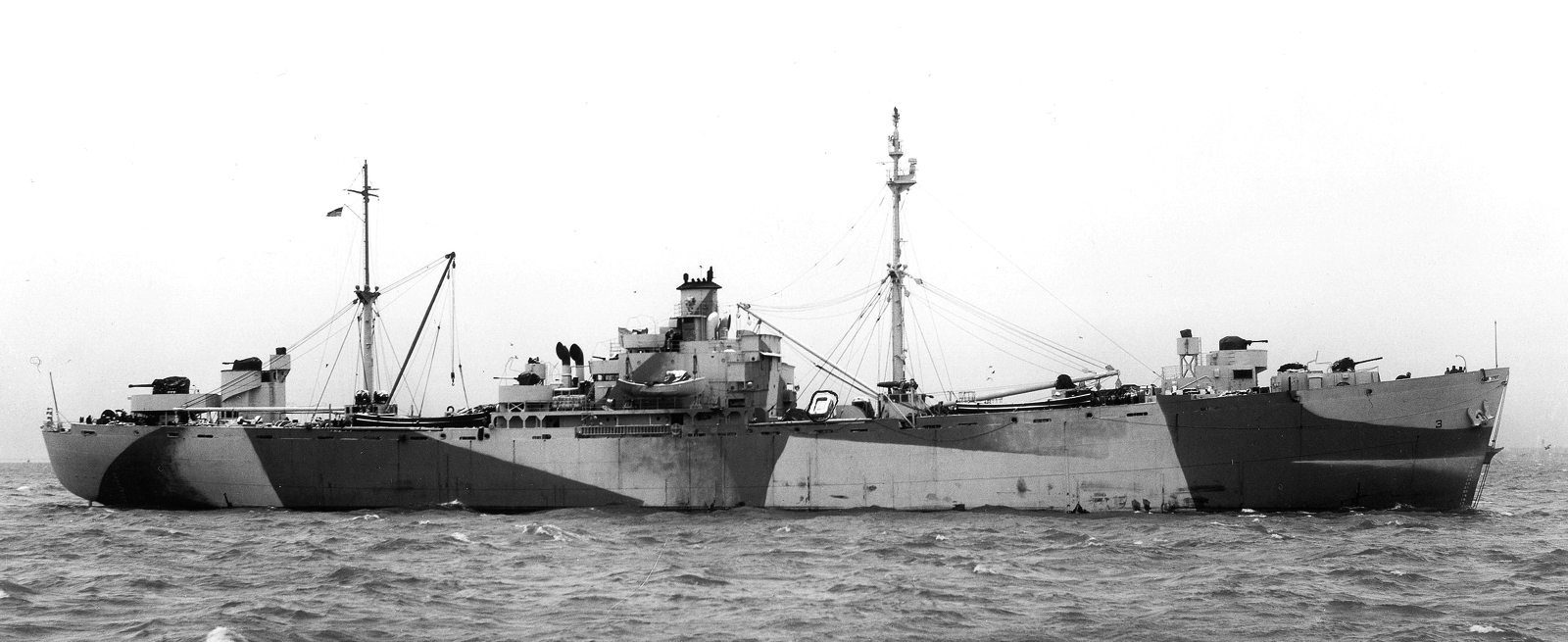
USS Mindanao

Mindanao was a repair ship built by Bethlehem Fairfield Shipyard. Her keel was laid on 11 April 1943. She was launched as Elbert Hubbard on 13 May and delivered to the United States Navy as Mindanao on 20 May. Severely damaged on 10 November 1944 when USS Mount Hood exploded at Seeadler Harbor, New Guinea. Subsequently repaired and returned to service. Laid up at Orange, Texas in 1946. Moved to Beaumont in 1961 and the James River in 1962. Scuttled off Daytona Beach, Florida in October 1980.

== Mingo Seam ==
Mingo Seam was a collier built by Delta Shipbuilding Company. Her keel was laid on 9 May 1945. She was launched on 17 July and delivered on 24 September. Built for the WSA, she was operated under the management of American-Hawaiian Steamship Co. Sold in 1946 to Mount Steamship Corp. and renamed Mount Sunapee. Operated under the management of American-Hawaiian Steamship Co. Sold in 1947 to Mystic Steamship Corp., Boston and renamed Melrose. Operated under the management of Eastern Gas & Fuel Association. Sold in 1954 to Atlantic Bulk Trading Corp. and renamed Tern. Reflagged to Liberia and operated under the management of Mystic Steamship Co. Sold in 1961 to Opca Plovidba Brodarsko, Split and renamed Uskok. Sold in 1962 to Jadranska Slobodna Plovidba, Split. Operated under the management of Adriatic Tramp Shipping. She was scrapped at Split in June 1967.

== Minnie M. Fiske ==
Minnie M. Fiske was built by J. A. Jones Construction Company, Panama City. Her keel was laid on 8 December 1943. She was launched on 29 January 1944 and delivered on 15 March. She was scrapped at Portland, Oregon in June 1966.

== Minor C. Keith ==
Minor C. Keith was built by Todd Houston Shipbuilding Corporation. Her keel was laid on 28 March 1944. She was launched on 8 May and delivered on 19 May. Built for the WSA, she was operated under the management of United Fruit Co. Sold in 1946 to Waterman Steamship Corp. and renamed Governor Brandon. Sold in 1949 to Actium Shipping Corp., New York and renamed Aktion. Sold in 1951 to Boise Griffen Agencieds Corp., New York and renamed Omega. Sold in 1954 to Omnium Steamship Corp. and renamed Omnium Freighter. Reflagged to Liberia and operated under the management of Omnium Freighting Corp. Sold in 1956 to Omnium Transportation Co., remaining under the same flag and managers. Lengthened at Yokohama in 1957. Now 511 feet 6 inches (155.91 m) long and 8,596 GRT. Sold in 1960 to Mol Shipping & Trading Inc. Reflagged to the United States and operated under the management of Omnium Agencies Co. Sold in 1961 to Laurence Steamship Co. Operated under the management of Suwannee Steamship Co. Sold in 1964 to Gloria Shipping Corp. and renamed Omnium Trader. Reflagged to Liberia, remaining under the same management. Sold in 1968 to Thor Management Co. and renamed Thor. Operated under the management of Pacific Steamship Agency. She was scrapped at Yawata, Japan in August 1969.

== Mintaka ==
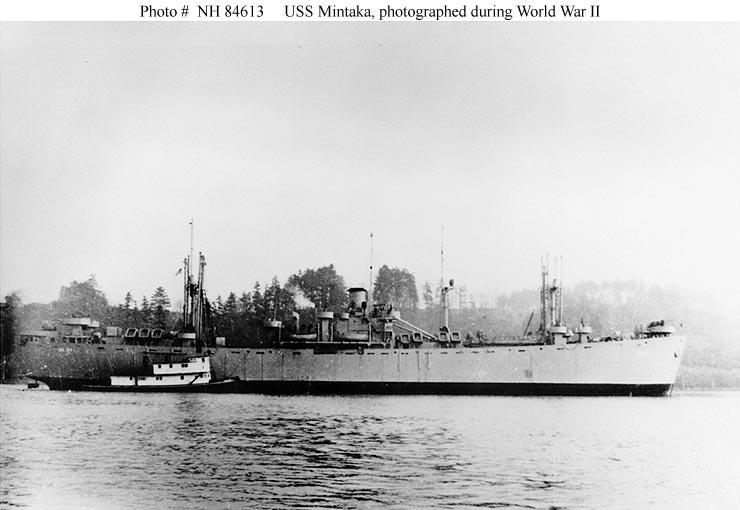
USS Mintaka

Mintaka was built by California Shipbuilding Corporation. Her keel was laid on 9 February 1943. She was launched on 10 March as Ansel Briggs and delivered as Mintaka for the United States Navy on 26 March. She was converted to a troopship at Portland, Oregon in November 1943. To WSA in February 1946, renamed Ansel Briggs. Laid up in Suisun Bay. She was scrapped at Oakland in April 1968.

== Mirabeau B. Lamar ==
Mirabeau B. Lamar was built by Todd Houston Shipbuilding Corporation. Her keel was laid on 30 December 1941. She was launched on 19 June 1942 and delivered on 28 July. She was scrapped at Mobile in January 1963.

== M. M. Guhin ==
M. M. Guhin was built by Oregon Shipbuilding Corporation. Her keel was laid on 5 December 1942. She was launched on 28 December and delivered on 5 January 1943. Laidup in the James River post war, she was reported to be at Kearny awaiting scrapping in December 1974.

== M. Michael Edelstein ==
M. Michael Edelstein was built by J. A. Jones Construction Company, Panama City. Her keel was laid on 28 April 1944. She was launched on 5 June and delivered on 22 June. Built for the WSA, she was operated under the management of Smith & Johnson. Sold in 1946 to Tirenna Società di Navigazione, Naples and renamed Milano. Renamed Milano II in 1953. Sold in 1954 to Società in Nome Colletivo Fratelli Lo Faro di Giovanni, Genoa and renamed Merit. She collided with the Dutch Victory ship Waterman in the Atlantic Ocean on 14 March 1957, holing Waterman. Sold in 1963 to Giovanni Bottiglieri, Naples and renamed Maria Bottiglieri. She was scrapped at La Spezia, Italy in March 1969.

== Moina Michael ==
Moina Michael was built by Southeastern Shipbuilding Corporation. Her keel was laid on 29 September 1944. She was launched on 9 November and delivered on 25 November. Laid up at Mobile post-war, she was scrapped at Panama City, Florida in October 1971.

== Mollie Moore Davis ==
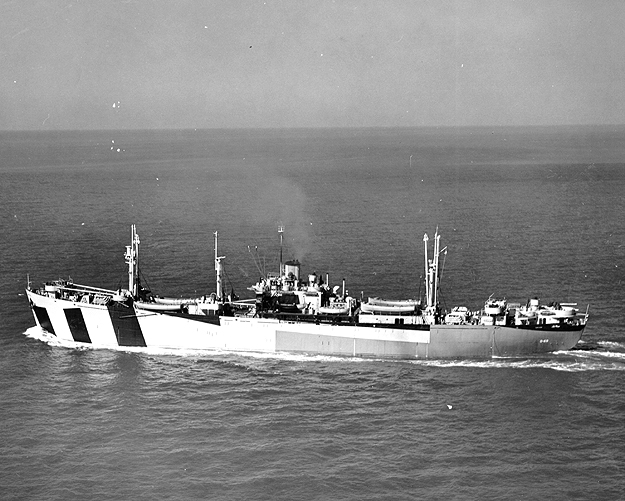
USS Burias

Mollie Moore Davis was built by Delta Shipbuilding Company. Her keel was laid on 11 February 1944. She was launched on as Mollie Moore Davis 27 March and delivered to the United States Navy as Burias on 21 April. Laid up in reserve at Pearl Harbor in April 1946. Towed to San Francisco in August 1947 and returned to USMC. Laid up in Suisun Bay, she was sold to shipbreakers in Portland, Oregon in November 1970.

== Molly Pitcher ==
Molly Pitcher was built by Bethlehem Fairfield Shipyard. Her keel was laid on 12 December 1942. She was launched on 30 January 1943 and delivered on 22 February. Built for the WSA, she was operated under the management of Prudential Steamship Co. She was torpedoed and damaged in the Atlantic Ocean 500 nautical miles (930 km) west of Lisbon, Portugal (38°21′N 19°54′W) by U-167 on 17 March 1943 whilst on a voyage from Baltimore to Casablanca and was abandoned. She was torpedoed by USS Champlin and U-521 on 18 March and sunk.

== Mona Island ==
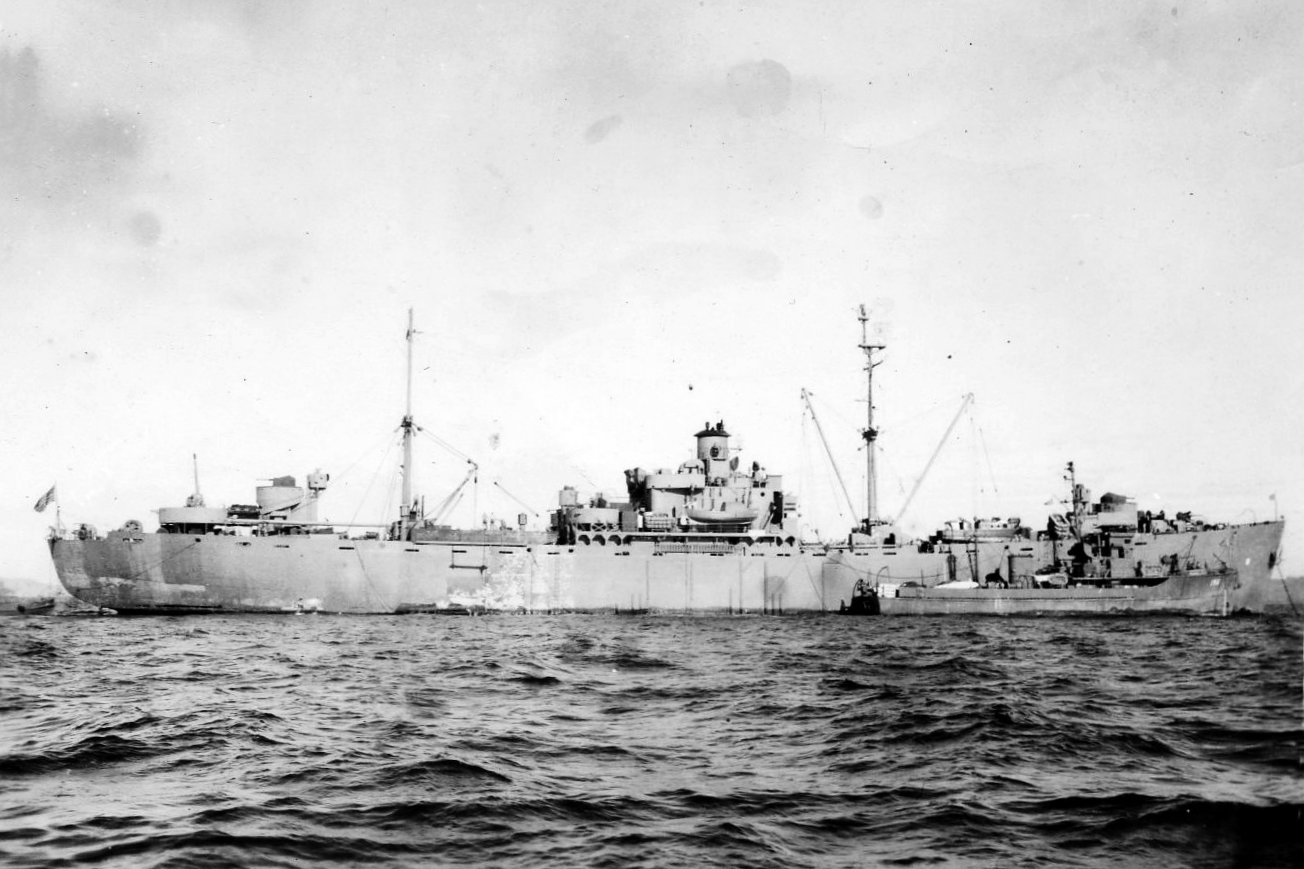
USS Mona Island

Mona Island was built by Bethlehem Fairfield Shipyard. Her keel was laid on 10 April 1944. She was launched on 11 May and delivered on 20 May. To the United States Navy. She ran aground off Okinawa during a typhoon on 9 October 1945. She was refloated and towed to Guam, where temporary repairs were made. Laid up in reserve at Norfolk, Virginia in June 1947. Moved to the James River in September 1962. She was scuttled off Wachapreague, Virginia in 1975.

== Montfort Stokes ==
Montfort Stokes was built by North Carolina Shipbuilding Company. Her keel was laid on 16 July 1943. She was launched as Montfort Stokes on 14 August and delivered as Samphire on 22 August. To the MoWT under Lend-Lease, operated under the management of P. Henderson & Co. Returned to USMC in 1947 and officially renamed Montfort Stokes, Laid up at Mobile bearing name Samphire. She was scrapped at Chickasaw, Alabama in April 1962.

== Morgan Robertson ==
Morgan Robertson was built by Permanente Metals Corporation. Her keel was laid on 10 January 1944. She was launched on 28 January and delivered on 4 February

== Morris C. Feinstone ==
Morris C. Feinstone was built by St. JohnsK River Shipbuilding Company. Her keel was laid on 5 September 1944. She was launched on 10 October and delivered on 22 October. Laid up in the James River post-war, she was scrapped at Bilbao in October 1972.

== Morris Hillquit ==
Morris Hillquit was built by Bethlehem Fairfield Shipyard. Her keel was laid on 24 December 1943. She was launched on 27 January 1944 and delivered on 10 February. Built for the WSA, she was operated under the management of Agwilines Inc. Laid up at Wilmington, North Carolina in 1947. Sold in 1951 to A. H. Bull Steamship Company, New York and renamed Hilton. Sold in 1963 to Jayanti Steamship Co., London & Bombay and renamed Govind Jayanti. Reflagged to India. She was scrapped at Hamburg in March 1966.

== Morrison R. Waite ==
Morrison R. Waite was built by Permanente Metals Corporation. Her keel was laid on 8 October 1942. She was launched on 10 November and delivered on 23 November. Built for the WSA, she was operated under the management of Pacific Far East Line. Damaged by a kamikaze attack in the Leyte Gulf on 12 November 1944. She was repaired at San Francisco. Laid up in reserve post-war, she was scrapped at Kearny in July 1963.

== Morris Sheppard ==
Morris Sheppard was built by Todd Houston Shipbuilding Corporation. Her keel was laid on 13 December 1943. She was launched on 3 February 1944 and delivered on 15 February. Built for the WSA, she was operated under the management of General Steamship Corp. Management transferred to A. L. Burbank & Co. in 1946. Sold later that year to Società Anonyme di Armamente Marittima Oriente, Venice and renamed Giuliano. Sold in 1960 to Navigazione Libera Giuliana, Venice. Sold in 1962 to the Polish Government and renamed Kopalnia Siemanowice. Operated under the management of Polska Żegluga Morska. Converted to a floating warehouse in 1966 and renamed MP PZZ-3. She arrived at Faslane, United Kingdom for scrapping in September 1978.

== Morris Sigman ==
Morris Sigman was built by Bethlehem Fairfield Shipyard. Her keel was laid on 30 December 1943. She was launched on 2 February 1944 and delivered on 19 February. Built for the WSA, she was operated under the management of American Export Lines Inc. Sold in 1947 to Arrow Steamship Co., New York and renamed Arthur Fribourg. Sold in 1955 to Bethlehem Steel Corp. and renamed Lossmar. Operated under the management of Calmar Steamship Corp. Laid up at Baltimore in 1966. To the United States Department of Commerce in 1968. She was scrapped at Santander in December 1968.

== Morton M. McCarver ==
Morton M. McCarver was built by Oregon Shipbuilding Corporation. Her keel was laid on 19 January 1943. She was launched on 18 February and delivered on 28 February. She was scrapped at Portland, Oregon in August 1967.

== Morton Prince ==
Morton Prince was a tanker built by California Shipbuilding Corporation. She was delivered in October 1943. Built for the WSA, she was operated under the management of American Petroleum Transport Corp. Sold in 1947 to Cuba Distilling Co., New York and renamed Carrabulle. Sold in 1951 to National Navigation Co., New York. Sold in 1952 to National Distillers Products Corp., New York. Sold in 1954 to San Rafael Compania Navigation, Panama and renamed Messathouri. Operated under the management of Orion Shipping & Trading Co. Converted to a cargo ship at Amsterdam. Lengthened at Kobe in 1956, now 511 feet 6 inches (155.91 m) long and 8,435 GRT. Reflagged to Liberia. Renamed Andros Mentor in 1957. Sold in 1960 to Sealanes Shipping Corp. and renamed Louros. Reflagged to Greece, remaining under the same management. Sold in 1962 to United Navigation Corp. and renamed Agios Nikolaos II. Reflagged to Greece and operated under the management of Constellation Maritime Agencies. sold in 1966 to Far East Shipping Co. Inc. and renamed Akiko. Reflagged to Liberia and operated under the management of Tramp Marine Agencies. She was scrapped at Split in September 1971.

== Moses Austin ==
Moses Austin was a limited troop carrier built by Todd Houston Shipbuilding Corporation. Her keel was laid on 25 February 1943. She was launched on 10 April and delivered on 25 April. Built for the WSA, she was operated under the management of American South African Line. To the French Government in 1947 and renamed Cherbourg. Operated under the management of Compagnie Générale Transatlantique. Sold in 1954 to Greenville S.A., Panama and renamed Antonios. Operated under the management of Wigham, Richardson & Co. Sold in 1966 to A. Halcoussis, Piraeus and renamed Dimos. She was scrapped at Whampoa Dock in July 1969.

== Moses Brown ==
Moses Brown was built by Walsh-Kaiser Company. Her keel was laid on 26 February 1943. She was launched on 10 May and delivered on 30 June. She was scrapped at Panama City, Florida in September 1961.

== Moses Cleaveland ==
Moses Cleaveland was built by Kaiser Company, Vancouver, Washington. She was delivered in February 1943. She was scrapped at Everett, Washington in April 1961.

== Moses G. Farmer ==
Moses G. Farmer was built by Permanente Metals Corporation. Her keel was laid on 23 December 1943. She was launched on 13 January 1944 and delivered on 20 January. She was scrapped at Tacoma in March 1962.

== Moses Rogers ==
Moses Rogers was built by Permanente Metals Corporation. Her keel was laid on 30 July 1942. She was launched on 13 September and delivered on 10 October. She was scrapped at Kearny in April 1971.

== Murat Halstead ==
Murat Halstead was built by Permanente Metals Corporation. Her keel was laid on 19 August 1943. She was launched as Murat Halstead on 13 September and delivered to the Chinese Government as Chung Cheng on 22 September. Torpedoed and sunk in the Arabian Sea (13°26′N 54°30′E) by U-188 on 5 February 1944 whilst on a voyage from Cochin, India to an American port.

== Murray M. Blum ==
Murray M. Blum was built by J. A. Jones Construction Company, Brunswick. Her keel was laid on 19 September 1944. She was launched on 25 October and delivered on 7 November. Built for the WSA, she was operated under the management of Mississippi Shipping Co. Laid up a Mobile post-war, she was scrapped at Panama City, Florida in December 1971.

== Myron T. Merrick ==
Myron T. Merrick was built by Permanente Metals Corporation. Her keel was laid on 9 July 1943. She was launched on 4 August and delivered on 15 August. She was scrapped at Everett in March 1961.
