= James Duke =

James Duke may refer to:

- James Buchanan Duke (1856–1925), American tobacco and electric power magnate
  - SS James B. Duke a Liberty ship
- James A. Duke (1929–2017), ethnobotanist
- Sir James Duke, 1st Baronet (1782–1873), British Member of Parliament
- Sir James Duke, 2nd Baronet, of the Duke baronets
- James "Red" Duke (1928–2015), Houston, Texas, doctor
- James Duke (footballer), Scottish footballer

== See also ==
- Jamie Dukes (born 1964), former American football player
