= SS Soter Ortynsky =

Liberty ship of WWII

History

United States
- Name: Soter Ortynsky
- Namesake: Soter Ortynsky
- Owner: War Shipping Administration (WSA)
- Operator: Wessel Duval & Company
- Ordered: as type (EC2-S-C1) hull, MC hull 2331
- Builder: J.A. Jones Construction, Panama City, Florida
- Cost: $945,007
- Yard number: 72
- Way number: 4
- Laid down: 25 October 1944
- Launched: 27 November 1944
- Completed: 8 December 1944
- Identification: Call sign: ANBO
- Fate: Placed in the James River Reserve Fleet, in Lee Hall, Virginia, 7 November 1945; Sold for scrapping, 21 December 1959, withdrawn from the fleet, 7 January 1960

General characteristics
- Class & type: Liberty ship; type EC2-S-C1, standard
- Tonnage: 10,865 LT DWT; 7,176 GRT
- Displacement: 3,380 long tons (3,434 t) (light); 14,245 long tons (14,474 t) (max)
- Length: 441 feet 6 inches (135 m) oa; 416 feet (127 m) pp; 427 feet (130 m) lwl
- Beam: 57 feet (17 m)
- Draft: 27 ft 9.25 in (8.4646 m)
- Installed power: 2 × Oil fired 450 °F (232 °C) boilers, operating at 220 psi (1,500 kPa); 2,500 hp (1,900 kW)
- Propulsion: 1 × triple-expansion steam engine, (manufactured by Filer and Stowell, Milwaukee, Wisconsin); 1 × screw propeller
- Speed: 11.5 knots (21.3 km/h; 13.2 mph)
- Capacity: 562,608 cubic feet (15,931 m^{3}) (grain); 499,573 cubic feet (14,146 m^{3}) (bale)
- Complement: 38–62 USMM; 21–40 USNAG
- Armament: Varied by ship; Bow-mounted 3-inch (76 mm)/50-caliber gun; Stern-mounted 4-inch (102 mm)/50-caliber gun; 2–8 × single 20-millimeter (0.79 in) Oerlikon anti-aircraft (AA) cannons and/or, 2–8 × 37-millimeter (1.46 in) M1 AA guns

SS Soter Ortynsky was a Liberty ship built in the United States during World War II. She was named after Soter Ortynsky, the first Bishop of all Greek Catholics in the United States.

== Construction ==
Soter Ortynsky was laid down on 25 October 1944, under a Maritime Commission (MARCOM) contract, MC hull 2331, by J.A. Jones Construction, Panama City, Florida; and launched on 27 November 1944.

== History ==
She was allocated to Wessel Duval & Company, 8 December 1944. On 7 November 1945, she was placed in the James River Reserve Fleet, in Lee Hall, Virginia. She had been laid up because of the need for $56,500 in repairs.

She was sold for scrapping, 21 December 1959, to Bethlehem Steel, for $75,421. She was withdrawn from the fleet, 7 January 1960.

== Bibliography ==
- "Jones Construction, Panama City FL". www.ShipbuildingHistory.com. 13 October 2010.
- Maritime Administration. "Soter Ortynsky". Ship History Database Vessel Status Card. U.S. Department of Transportation, Maritime Administration. This article incorporates text from this source, which is in the public domain.
- Davies, James (May 2004). "Specifications (As-Built)" (PDF). p. 23.
- "SS Soter Ortynsky".
