= SS Thomas B. King =

World War II Liberty ship of the United States

History

United States
- Name: Thomas B. King
- Namesake: Thomas B. King
- Ordered: as type (EC2-S-C1) hull, MC hull 2369
- Builder: J.A. Jones Construction, Brunswick, Georgia
- Cost: $1,036,617
- Yard number: 154
- Way number: 2
- Laid down: 23 June 1944
- Launched: 7 August 1944
- Sponsored by: Mrs. Franklin D. Aikens
- Completed: 19 August 1944
- Identification: Call Signal: WSKL
- Fate: Laid up in National Defense Reserve Fleet, Wilmington, North Carolina, 19 March 1948; Laid up in National Defense Reserve Fleet, Hudson River Group, 29 June 1953; Sold for scrapping, 15 May 1970

General characteristics
- Class & type: Liberty ship; type EC2-S-C1, standard
- Tonnage: 10,865 LT DWT; 7,176 GRT
- Displacement: 3,380 long tons (3,434 t) (light); 14,245 long tons (14,474 t) (max)
- Length: 441 feet 6 inches (135 m) oa; 416 feet (127 m) pp; 427 feet (130 m) lwl
- Beam: 57 feet (17 m)
- Draft: 27 ft 9.25 in (8.4646 m)
- Installed power: 2 × Oil fired 450 °F (232 °C) boilers, operating at 220 psi (1,500 kPa); 2,500 hp (1,900 kW)
- Propulsion: 1 × triple-expansion steam engine, (manufactured by Joshua Hendy Iron Works, Sunnyvale, California); 1 × screw propeller
- Speed: 11.5 knots (21.3 km/h; 13.2 mph)
- Capacity: 562,608 cubic feet (15,931 m^{3}) (grain); 499,573 cubic feet (14,146 m^{3}) (bale)
- Complement: 38–62 USMM; 21–40 USNAG
- Armament: Varied by ship; Bow-mounted 3-inch (76 mm)/50-caliber gun; Stern-mounted 4-inch (102 mm)/50-caliber gun; 2–8 × single 20-millimeter (0.79 in) Oerlikon anti-aircraft (AA) cannons and/or, 2–8 × 37-millimeter (1.46 in) M1 AA guns

SS Thomas B. King was a Liberty ship built in the United States during World War II. She was named after Thomas B. King, a United States representative from Georgia.

== Construction ==
Thomas B. King was laid down on 23 June 1944, under a Maritime Commission (MARCOM) contract, MC hull 2369, by J.A. Jones Construction, Brunswick, Georgia; she was sponsored by Mrs. Franklin D. Aikens, and launched on 7 August 1944.

== History ==
She was allocated to Wessel Duval & Company, on 19 August 1944. On 8 June 1950, she was laid up in the National Defense Reserve Fleet in Wilmington, North Carolina. On 19 June 1953, she was withdrawn from the fleet to be loaded with grain under the "Grain Program 1953", she relocated to the Hudson River Reserve Fleet, loaded with grain on 29 June 1953. She was withdrawn from the fleet on 11 April 1956, to have the grain unloaded and returned empty on 18 April 1956. On 8 August 1956, she was withdrawn from the fleet to be loaded with grain under the "Grain Program 1956", she returned loaded with grain on 23 August 1956. She was withdrawn from the fleet on 18 March 1961, to have the grain unloaded and returned empty on 26 March 1961. On 5 August 1961, she was withdrawn from the fleet to be loaded with grain under the "Grain Program 1961", she returned loaded with grain on 17 August 1961. She was withdrawn from the fleet on 7 August 1963, to have the grain unloaded and returned empty on 12 August 1963. On 15 May 1970, she was sold for scrapping to Union Minerals & Alloys Co. She was removed from the fleet on 9 July 1970.

== Bibliography ==
- "Jones Construction, Brunswick GA". www.ShipbuildingHistory.com. 13 October 2010.
- "Liberty Ships – World War II".
- Maritime Administration. "Thomas B. King". Ship History Database Vessel Status Card. U.S. Department of Transportation, Maritime Administration. Archived from the original on 12 December 2019.
- Davies, James (May 2004). "Specifications (As-Built)" (PDF). p. 23.
- "SS Thomas B. King".
