= SS John L. McCarley =

Liberty ship of WWII

History

United States
- Name: John L. McCarley
- Namesake: John L. McCarley
- Owner: War Shipping Administration (WSA)
- Operator: Alcoa Steamship Co., Inc.
- Ordered: as type (EC2-S-C5) hull, MC hull 2342
- Builder: J.A. Jones Construction, Panama City, Florida
- Cost: $1,058,347
- Yard number: 83
- Way number: 4
- Laid down: 10 January 1945
- Launched: 14 February 1945
- Sponsored by: Mrs. Estell Twing
- Completed: 27 February 1945
- Identification: Call sign: ANIL
- Fate: Transferred to the, National Defense Reserve Fleet, Mobile, Alabama, 19 August 1949; Sold for scrapping, 1 May 1972, removed from fleet, 13 July 1972

General characteristics
- Class & type: Liberty ship; type EC2-S-C5, boxed aircraft transport
- Tonnage: 10,600 LT DWT; 7,200 GRT
- Displacement: 3,380 long tons (3,434 t) (light); 14,245 long tons (14,474 t) (max)
- Length: 441 feet 6 inches (135 m) oa; 416 feet (127 m) pp; 427 feet (130 m) lwl
- Beam: 57 feet (17 m)
- Draft: 27 ft 9.25 in (8.4646 m)
- Installed power: 2 × Oil fired 450 °F (232 °C) boilers, operating at 220 psi (1,500 kPa); 2,500 hp (1,900 kW)
- Propulsion: 1 × triple-expansion steam engine, (manufactured by Joshua Hendy Iron Works, Sunnyvale, California); 1 × screw propeller
- Speed: 11.5 knots (21.3 km/h; 13.2 mph)
- Capacity: 490,000 cubic feet (13,875 m^{3}) (bale)
- Complement: 38–62 USMM; 21–40 USNAG
- Armament: Varied by ship; Bow-mounted 3-inch (76 mm)/50-caliber gun; Stern-mounted 4-inch (102 mm)/50-caliber gun; 2–8 × single 20-millimeter (0.79 in) Oerlikon anti-aircraft (AA) cannons and/or, 2–8 × 37-millimeter (1.46 in) M1 AA guns

SS John L. McCarley was a Liberty ship built in the United States during World War II. She was named after John L. McCarley.

== Construction ==
John L. McCarley was laid down on 10 January 1945, under a Maritime Commission (MARCOM) contract, MC hull 2342, by J.A. Jones Construction, Panama City, Florida; sponsored by Mrs. Estell Twing, the wife of W.B. Twing, general delivery, she was launched on 14 February 1945.

== History ==
She was allocated to Alcoa Steamship Co., Inc., on 27 February 1945. After a number of contracts, on 19 August 1949, she was laid up in the National Defense Reserve Fleet, Mobile, Alabama. She was sold for scrapping, 1 May 1972, to Pinto Island Metals Co., for $36,850. She was withdrawn from the fleet, 13 July 1972.

== Bibliography ==
- "Jones Construction, Panama City FL". www.ShipbuildingHistory.com. 13 October 2010.
- Maritime Administration. "John L. McCarley". Ship History Database Vessel Status Card. U.S. Department of Transportation, Maritime Administration.
- Davies, James (May 2004). "Specifications (As-Built)" (PDF). p. 23.
- "SS John L. McCarley".
