= Sir Murray =

Sir Murray may refer to:

- Sir Murrary Pringle, 10th Baronet, British Accountant
- Sir Murray MacLehose, Hong Kong Politician
- Sir Murray Maxwell, Royal Navy Officer
- Sir Murray Gordon Hamberg, New Zealand Athlete
- Sam Murray, Footballer
- Sam Murray, British Paralympic Rower
- Sam Murray, Flute maker
- SS Murray M. Blum, WW2 Ship of the U.S.
- Sel Murray, Australian Rules Footballer
