= SS James B. Duke =

World War II Liberty ship of the United States

History

United States
- Name: James B. Duke
- Namesake: James B. Duke
- Operator: Wessel Duval & Company
- Ordered: as type (EC2-S-C1) hull, MC hull 2362
- Builder: J.A. Jones Construction, Brunswick, Georgia
- Cost: $1,062,861
- Yard number: 147
- Way number: 1
- Laid down: 29 April 1944
- Launched: 19 June 1944
- Sponsored by: Mrs.Doris Duke Cromwell
- Completed: 30 June 1944
- Identification: Call Signal: WPZA
- Fate: Laid up in National Defense Reserve Fleet, Mobile, Alabama, 23 September 1949; Laid up in National Defense Reserve Fleet, Beaumont, Texas, 30 March 1952; Sold for scrapping, 1 May 1972

General characteristics
- Class & type: Liberty ship; type EC2-S-C1, standard
- Tonnage: 10,865 LT DWT; 7,176 GRT
- Displacement: 3,380 long tons (3,434 t) (light); 14,245 long tons (14,474 t) (max)
- Length: 441 feet 6 inches (135 m) oa; 416 feet (127 m) pp; 427 feet (130 m) lwl
- Beam: 57 feet (17 m)
- Draft: 27 ft 9.25 in (8.4646 m)
- Installed power: 2 × Oil fired 450 °F (232 °C) boilers, operating at 220 psi (1,500 kPa); 2,500 hp (1,900 kW)
- Propulsion: 1 × triple-expansion steam engine, (manufactured by Joshua Hendy Iron Works, Sunnyvale, California); 1 × screw propeller
- Speed: 11.5 knots (21.3 km/h; 13.2 mph)
- Capacity: 562,608 cubic feet (15,931 m^{3}) (grain); 499,573 cubic feet (14,146 m^{3}) (bale)
- Complement: 38–62 USMM; 21–40 USNAG
- Armament: Varied by ship; Bow-mounted 3-inch (76 mm)/50-caliber gun; Stern-mounted 4-inch (102 mm)/50-caliber gun; 2–8 × single 20-millimeter (0.79 in) Oerlikon anti-aircraft (AA) cannons and/or, 2–8 × 37-millimeter (1.46 in) M1 AA guns

SS James B. Duke was a Liberty ship built in the United States during World War II. She was named after James B. Duke, founder of the American Tobacco Company, co-founder of Duke Energy, and establisher of The Duke Endowment.

== Construction ==
James B. Duke was laid down on 29 April 1944, under a United States Maritime Commission (MARCOM) contract, MC hull 2362, by J.A. Jones Construction, Brunswick, Georgia; she was sponsored by Mrs.Doris Duke Cromwell, daughter of James Duke, and launched on 19 June 1944.

== History ==
She was allocated to Wessel Duval & Company, on 30 June 1944. On 23 September 1949, she was laid up in the National Defense Reserve Fleet in Mobile, Alabama. On 30 March 1952, she was laid up in the National Defense Reserve Fleet in Beaumont, Texas. On 1 May 1972, she was sold to Luria Brothers & Company, for $40,333.33, for scrapping. She was removed from the fleet on 27 June 1972.

== Bibliography ==
- "Jones Construction, Brunswick GA". ShipbuildingHistory.com. 13 October 2010.
- "Liberty Ships – World War II".
- Maritime Administration. "James B. Duke". Ship History Database Vessel Status Card. U.S. Department of Transportation, Maritime Administration. Archived from the original on 12 December 2019.
- Davies, James (May 2004). "Specifications (As-Built)" (PDF). p. 23.
- "SS James B. Duke".
