= James L. Ackerson =

United States Naval officer (1881 - 1931)

James L. Ackerson (1881-1931) was a United States Navy officer and naval constructor. He served as the general manager, vice president and trustee of the United States Shipping Board Emergency Fleet Corp in 1918.

After graduating from the U.S. Naval Academy in 1901, Ackerson started serving in the Construction Corps. He then completed a naval architecture course at the Massachusetts Institute of Technology in 1906. After this, he was appointed to the Brooklyn Navy yard and later transferred to the Bureau of Construction and Repair. He was then loaned to the Shipping Board during World War II.

Ackerson died on September 13, 1931.

The SS James L. Ackerson was named after him.
