= SS John Morgan =

World War II Liberty ship of the United States

- A Liberty ship at sea

History

United States
- Name: John Morgan
- Namesake: General John Tyler Morgan
- Builder: Bethlehem Shipbuilding Corporation, Baltimore, Maryland
- Yard number: 2128
- Way number: 12
- Laid down: 31 March 1943
- Launched: 4 May 1943
- Completed: 12 May 1943
- Fate: Sunk after collision, 1 June 1943

General characteristics
- Class & type: Type EC2-S-C1 Liberty ship
- Displacement: 14,245 long tons (14,474 t)
- Length: 441 ft 6 in (134.57 m) o/a; 417 ft 9 in (127.33 m) p/p; 427 ft (130 m) w/l
- Beam: 57 ft (17 m)
- Draft: 27 ft 9 in (8.46 m)
- Propulsion: Two oil-fired boilers; Triple-expansion steam engine; 2,500 hp (1,900 kW); Single screw
- Speed: 11 knots (20 km/h; 13 mph)
- Range: 20,000 nmi (37,000 km; 23,000 mi)
- Capacity: 10,856 t (10,685 long tons) deadweight (DWT)
- Crew: 81
- Armament: Stern-mounted 4 in (100 mm) deck gun for use against surfaced submarines, variety of anti-aircraft guns

SS John Morgan was a World War II Liberty ship built by the Bethlehem Shipbuilding Corporation at their Bethlehem-Fairfield yard at Baltimore, Maryland, and launched on 4 May 1943. She was operated by the Wessel Duval & Company for the war.

However, on 1 June 1943, during its maiden voyage John Morgan collided with the tanker SS Montana off Cape Henry on the coast of Virginia. John Morgan broke in two and sank immediately at position 36°59′56″N 75°23′59″W, but started fires aboard Montana. USS Shubrick, engaged in gunnery practice in the Chesapeake Bay, was sent to investigate. She sent a party aboard Montana to assist in extinguishing the fires, but recalled them after discovering that Montana was also carrying ammunition. Soon afterwards Herndon and Nelson arrived, and circled the area looking for survivors, but recovered only 12 bodies.

== The wreck ==
The ship lies in approximately 110 ft (34 m) of water. It is largely broken up, but the bow and a structure known as the "hospital" are still recognizable. The ship was on the United States lend-lease program and was loaded with war supplies such as Valentine tanks, P-39s, and large amounts of ammunition.
