= SS John Philip Sousa =

Liberty ship of WWII

History

United States
- Name: John Philip Sousa
- Namesake: John Philip Sousa
- Owner: War Shipping Administration (WSA)
- Operator: Wessel Duval & Company
- Ordered: as type (EC2-S-C1) hull, MC hull 1200
- Builder: St. Johns River Shipbuilding Company, Jacksonville, Florida
- Cost: $2,279,886
- Yard number: 8
- Way number: 2
- Laid down: 29 March 1943
- Launched: 4 July 1943
- Sponsored by: Mrs. Kenneth A.Merrill
- Completed: 6 August 1943
- Identification: Call sign: KOAB
- Fate: Sold for commercial use, 15 October 1946, withdrawn from fleet, 1 November 1946

Honduras
- Name: Erato
- Owner: Compania Internacional de Vapores
- Operator: Simpson, Spence, and Young
- Fate: Sold, 1954

Honduras
- Name: Taxiarchis
- Owner: Compania Nav. de Belen
- Operator: Lemos Bros.
- Fate: Sold, 1960

Greece
- Name: Protostatis
- Owner: Compania Nav. de Protostatis
- Operator: Lemos Bros.
- Fate: Grounded in Lake Ontario, 30 September 1965; Refloated and grounded on Wolfe Island, St. Lawrence River, 16 November 1965; Scrapped, 1966

General characteristics
- Class & type: Liberty ship; type EC2-S-C1, standard
- Tonnage: 10,865 LT DWT; 7,176 GRT
- Displacement: 3,380 long tons (3,434 t) (light); 14,245 long tons (14,474 t) (max)
- Length: 441 feet 6 inches (135 m) oa; 416 feet (127 m) pp; 427 feet (130 m) lwl
- Beam: 57 feet (17 m)
- Draft: 27 ft 9.25 in (8.4646 m)
- Installed power: 2 × Oil fired 450 °F (232 °C) boilers, operating at 220 psi (1,500 kPa); 2,500 hp (1,900 kW)
- Propulsion: 1 × triple-expansion steam engine, (manufactured by Filer and Stowell, Milwaukee, Wisconsin); 1 × screw propeller
- Speed: 11.5 knots (21.3 km/h; 13.2 mph)
- Capacity: 562,608 cubic feet (15,931 m^{3}) (grain); 499,573 cubic feet (14,146 m^{3}) (bale)
- Complement: 38–62 USMM; 21–40 USNAG
- Armament: Varied by ship; Bow-mounted 3-inch (76 mm)/50-caliber gun; Stern-mounted 4-inch (102 mm)/50-caliber gun; 2–8 × single 20-millimeter (0.79 in) Oerlikon anti-aircraft (AA) cannons and/or, 2–8 × 37-millimeter (1.46 in) M1 AA guns

SS John Philip Sousa was a Liberty ship built in the United States during World War II. She was named after John Philip Sousa, an American composer and conductor of the late Romantic era known primarily for American military marches.

== Construction ==
John Philip Sousa was laid down on 29 March 1943, under a Maritime Commission (MARCOM) contract, MC hull 1200, by the St. Johns River Shipbuilding Company, Jacksonville, Florida; she was sponsored by Mrs. Kenneth A. Merrill, the wife of the vice president of the St. Johns River SB Co., she was launched on 4 July 1943.

== History ==
She was allocated to Wessel Duval & Company on 6 August 1943. On 6 June 1946, she was placed in the Hudson River Reserve Fleet, Jones Point, New York. She was sold for commercial use, on 15 October 1946, to Compania Internacional de Vapores, and renamed Erato. She was withdrawn from the fleet, 1 November 1946. On 30 September 1965, while operating as Protostatis, she ran aground in Lake Ontario and suffered extensive damage. After being refloated, she again ran aground on Wolfe Island, at the mouth of the St. Lawrence River, while being towed to Montreal, on 16 November 1965. She was declared a constructive total loss (CTL) and scrapped in 1966.

The bell from the ship is still used by the United States Marine Band, particularly in Sousa's piece, The Liberty Bell.

== Bibliography ==
- "St. John's River Shipbuilding, Jacksonville FL". www.ShipbuildingHistory.com. 16 October 2010.
- Maritime Administration. "John Philip Sousa". Ship History Database Vessel Status Card. U.S. Department of Transportation, Maritime Administration.
- Davies, James (May 2004). "Specifications (As-Built)" (PDF). p. 23.
- "SS John Philip Sousa".
