= SS Andrew Turnbull =

Liberty ship of WWII

History

United States
- Name: Andrew Turnbull
- Namesake: Andrew Turnbull
- Owner: War Shipping Administration (WSA)
- Operator: Wessel Duval & Company
- Ordered: as type (EC2-S-C1) hull, MC hull 1222
- Builder: St. Johns River Shipbuilding Company, Jacksonville, Florida
- Cost: $1,387,226
- Yard number: 30
- Way number: 6
- Laid down: 15 December 1943
- Launched: 8 February 1944
- Sponsored by: Mrs. James C. Merrill, Jr.
- Completed: 19 February 1944
- Identification: Call sign: KVQQ
- Fate: Laid up in the, National Defense Reserve Fleet, Astoria, Oregon, 6 November 1946; Sold for scrapping, 31 January 1968, removed from fleet, 15 February 1968

General characteristics
- Class & type: Liberty ship; type EC2-S-C1, standard
- Tonnage: 10,865 LT DWT; 7,176 GRT
- Displacement: 3,380 long tons (3,434 t) (light); 14,245 long tons (14,474 t) (max)
- Length: 441 feet 6 inches (135 m) oa; 416 feet (127 m) pp; 427 feet (130 m) lwl
- Beam: 57 feet (17 m)
- Draft: 27 ft 9.25 in (8.4646 m)
- Installed power: 2 × Oil fired 450 °F (232 °C) boilers, operating at 220 psi (1,500 kPa); 2,500 hp (1,900 kW)
- Propulsion: 1 × triple-expansion steam engine, (manufactured by Filer and Stowell, Milwaukee, Wisconsin); 1 × screw propeller
- Speed: 11.5 knots (21.3 km/h; 13.2 mph)
- Capacity: 562,608 cubic feet (15,931 m^{3}) (grain); 499,573 cubic feet (14,146 m^{3}) (bale)
- Complement: 38–62 USMM; 21–40 USNAG
- Armament: Varied by ship; Bow-mounted 3-inch (76 mm)/50-caliber gun; Stern-mounted 4-inch (102 mm)/50-caliber gun; 2–8 × single 20-millimeter (0.79 in) Oerlikon anti-aircraft (AA) cannons and/or, 2–8 × 37-millimeter (1.46 in) M1 AA guns

SS Andrew Turnbull was a Liberty ship built in the United States during World War II. She was named after Andrew Turnbull, a Scottish physician who later served as a British Consul at Smyrna, then part of the Ottoman Empire, in what is now Turkey. In 1768, he organized the largest attempt at British colonization in the New World by founding New Smyrna, Florida, named in honor of his wife's birthplace.

== Construction ==
Andrew Turnbull was laid down on 15 December 1943, under a Maritime Commission (MARCOM) contract, MC hull 1222, by the St. Johns River Shipbuilding Company, Jacksonville, Florida; she was sponsored by Mrs. James C. Merrill Jr., the wife of a Merrill-Stevens Drydock & Repair Co. executive, and was launched on 8 February 1944.

== History ==
She was allocated to the Wessel Duval & Company, on 19 February 1944. On 6 November 1946, she was laid up in the National Defense Reserve Fleet, Astoria, Oregon. On 17 August 1954, she was withdrawn from the fleet to be loaded with grain under the "Grain Program 1954", she returned loaded on 28 August 1954. On 8 July 1957, she was withdrawn to be unload, she returned on empty 12 July 1957. She was sold for scrapping, 31 January 1968, to Zidell Explorations, Inc. She was removed from the fleet on 15 February 1968.

== Bibliography ==
- "St. John's River Shipbuilding, Jacksonville FL". www.ShipbuildingHistory.com. 16 October 2010.
- Maritime Administration. "Andrew Turnbull". Ship History Database Vessel Status Card. U.S. Department of Transportation, Maritime Administration.
- Davies, James (May 2004). "Specifications (As-Built)" (PDF). p. 23.
- "SS Andrew Turnbull".
