= SS Michael James Monohan =

Liberty ship of WWII

History

United States
- Name: Michael James Monohan
- Namesake: Michael James Monohan
- Owner: War Shipping Administration (WSA)
- Operator: Alcoa Steamship Co., Inc.
- Ordered: as type (EC2-S-C5) hull, MC hull 2335
- Builder: J.A. Jones Construction, Panama City, Florida
- Cost: $1,251,002
- Yard number: 76
- Way number: 3
- Laid down: 22 November 1944
- Launched: 4 January 1945
- Sponsored by: Mrs. W.P. Cornelius
- Completed: 17 January 1945
- Identification: Call sign: ANFA
- Fate: Transferred to the, National Defense Reserve Fleet, Wilmington, North Carolina, 22 October 1947; Transferred to US Navy, 17 March 1967, removed from fleet, 14 April 1967; Scuttled, May 1970

General characteristics
- Class & type: Liberty ship; type EC2-S-C5, boxed aircraft transport
- Tonnage: 10,600 LT DWT; 7,200 GRT
- Displacement: 3,380 long tons (3,434 t) (light); 14,245 long tons (14,474 t) (max)
- Length: 441 feet 6 inches (135 m) oa; 416 feet (127 m) pp; 427 feet (130 m) lwl
- Beam: 57 feet (17 m)
- Draft: 27 ft 9.25 in (8.4646 m)
- Installed power: 2 × Oil fired 450 °F (232 °C) boilers, operating at 220 psi (1,500 kPa); 2,500 hp (1,900 kW)
- Propulsion: 1 × triple-expansion steam engine, (manufactured by Filer and Stowell, Milwaukee, Wisconsin); 1 × screw propeller
- Speed: 11.5 knots (21.3 km/h; 13.2 mph)
- Capacity: 490,000 cubic feet (13,875 m^{3}) (bale)
- Complement: 38–62 USMM; 21–40 USNAG
- Armament: Varied by ship; Bow-mounted 3-inch (76 mm)/50-caliber gun; Stern-mounted 4-inch (102 mm)/50-caliber gun; 2–8 × single 20-millimeter (0.79 in) Oerlikon anti-aircraft (AA) cannons and/or, 2–8 × 37-millimeter (1.46 in) M1 AA guns

SS Michael James Monohan was a Liberty ship built in the United States during World War II. She was named after Michael James Monohan, a Merchant marine killed when U-123 torpedoed SS Gulfamerica, 5 mi (8.0 km) off the coast of Jacksonville, Florida, 11 April 1943.

== Construction ==
Michael James Monohan was laid down on 22 November 1944, under a Maritime Commission (MARCOM) contract, MC hull 2335, by J.A. Jones Construction, Panama City, Florida; sponsored by Mrs. W.P. Cornelius, the wife of Colonel W.P. Cornelius, US Army, she was launched on 4 January 1945.

== History ==
She was allocated to Alcoa Steamship Co., Inc., on 17 January 1945. After a number of contracts, on 22 October 1947, she was laid up in the National Defense Reserve Fleet, Wilmington, North Carolina. On 14 April 1967, she was transferred to the US Navy for use as a Disposal Ship. She was scuttled with obsolete rocket motors off the coast of Virginia.

== Bibliography ==
- "Jones Construction, Panama City FL". www.ShipbuildingHistory.com. 13 October 2010.
- Maritime Administration. "Michael James Monohan". Ship History Database Vessel Status Card. U.S. Department of Transportation, Maritime Administration.
- Davies, James (May 2004). "Specifications (As-Built)" (PDF). p. 23.
- "SS Michael James Monohan".
- "SS Michael James Monohan". www.Wrecksite.eu. 16 June 2010.
- "THE PEOPLE BEHIND THE NAMES". Armed-guard.com.
