= SS M. E. Comerford =

World War II Liberty ship of the United States

History

United States
- Name: M. E. Comerford
- Namesake: Michael Comerford
- Ordered: as type (EC2-S-C1) hull, MC hull 2390
- Builder: J.A. Jones Construction, Brunswick, Georgia
- Cost: $806,170
- Yard number: 175
- Way number: 5
- Laid down: 10 November 1944
- Launched: 12 December 1944
- Sponsored by: Mrs. M.E. Comerford
- Completed: 20 December 1944
- Identification: Call Signal: ANBJ
- Fate: Laid up in the National Defense Reserve Fleet, Suisun Bay Group, 8 October 1948; Laid up in the National Defense Reserve Fleet, Olympia, Washington, 21 August 1952; Sold for scrapping, 12 January 1970

General characteristics
- Class & type: Liberty ship; type EC2-S-C1, standard
- Tonnage: 10,865 LT DWT; 7,176 GRT
- Displacement: 3,380 long tons (3,434 t) (light); 14,245 long tons (14,474 t) (max)
- Length: 441 feet 6 inches (135 m) oa; 416 feet (127 m) pp; 427 feet (130 m) lwl
- Beam: 57 feet (17 m)
- Draft: 27 ft 9.25 in (8.4646 m)
- Installed power: 2 × Oil fired 450 °F (232 °C) boilers, operating at 220 psi (1,500 kPa); 2,500 hp (1,900 kW)
- Propulsion: 1 × triple-expansion steam engine, (manufactured by General Machinery Corp., Hamilton, Ohio); 1 × screw propeller
- Speed: 11.5 knots (21.3 km/h; 13.2 mph)
- Capacity: 562,608 cubic feet (15,931 m^{3}) (grain); 499,573 cubic feet (14,146 m^{3}) (bale)
- Complement: 38–62 USMM; 21–40 USNAG
- Armament: Varied by ship; Bow-mounted 3-inch (76 mm)/50-caliber gun; Stern-mounted 4-inch (102 mm)/50-caliber gun; 2–8 × single 20-millimeter (0.79 in) Oerlikon anti-aircraft (AA) cannons and/or, 2–8 × 37-millimeter (1.46 in) M1 AA guns

SS M. E. Comerford was a Liberty ship built in the United States during World War II. She was named after Michael Comerford, owner of Comerford Theatres, a chain of some of the first movie theaters in Pennsylvania and New York.

== Construction ==
M. E. Comerford was laid down on 10 November 1944, under a United States Maritime Commission (MARCOM) contract, MC hull 2390, by J.A. Jones Construction, Brunswick, Georgia; she was sponsored by Mrs. M.E. Comerford, widow of the namesake, and launched on 12 December 1944.

== History ==
She was allocated to Merchants & Miners Transportation Company, on 20 December 1944. On 8 October 1948, she was laid up in the National Defense Reserve Fleet, in the Suisun Bay Group. On 21 August 1952, she was laid up in the National Defense Reserve Fleet, in Olympia, Washington. On 5 April 1954, she was withdrawn to be load with grain as part of the "Grain Program – 1954". She returned loaded with grain on 17 April 1954. On 19 May 1957, she was withdrawn to have the grain unloaded. She returned to the fleet empty on 25 May 1957. On 12 January 1971, she was sold for $87,000, to Zidell Exploration Co., Ltd., for scrapping. She was removed from the fleet on 16 January 1970.

== Bibliography ==
- "Jones Construction, Brunswick GA". ShipbuildingHistory.com. 13 October 2010.
- "Liberty Ships – World War II".
- Maritime Administration. "M. E. Comerford". Ship History Database Vessel Status Card. U.S. Department of Transportation, Maritime Administration. Archived from the original on 12 December 2019.
- Davies, James (May 2004). "Specifications (As-Built)" (PDF). p. 23.
- "SS M. E. Comerford".
