= SS Mary Ball =

World War II Liberty ship

History

United States
- Name: Mary Ball
- Namesake: Mary Ball Washington
- Owner: War Shipping Administration (WSA)
- Operator: United Fruit Co.
- Ordered: as type (Z-EC2-S-C2) hull, MC hull 1534
- Builder: J.A. Jones Construction, Panama City, Florida
- Cost: $2,143,464
- Yard number: 16
- Way number: 1
- Laid down: 20 July 1943
- Launched: 17 October 1943
- Completed: 23 November 1943
- Identification: Call Signal: KYHQ
- Fate: Laid up in National Defense Reserve Fleet, Mobile, Alabama, 20 June 1946; Sold for scrapping, 28 October 1971

General characteristics
- Class & type: type Z-EC2-S-C2, army tank transport
- Tonnage: 10,865 LT DWT; 7,176 GRT
- Displacement: 3,380 long tons (3,434 t) (light); 14,245 long tons (14,474 t) (max)
- Length: 441 feet 6 inches (135 m) oa; 416 feet (127 m) pp; 427 feet (130 m) lwl
- Beam: 57 feet (17 m)
- Draft: 27 ft 9.25 in (8.4646 m)
- Installed power: 2 × Oil fired 450 °F (232 °C) boilers, operating at 220 psi (1,500 kPa); 2,500 hp (1,900 kW)
- Propulsion: 1 × triple-expansion steam engine, (manufactured by Filer and Stowell, Milwaukee, Wisconsin); 1 × screw propeller
- Speed: 11.5 knots (21.3 km/h; 13.2 mph)
- Capacity: 562,608 cubic feet (15,931 m^{3}) (grain); 499,573 cubic feet (14,146 m^{3}) (bale)
- Complement: 38–62 USMM; 21–40 USNAG
- Armament: Varied by ship; Bow-mounted 3-inch (76 mm)/50-caliber gun; Stern-mounted 4-inch (102 mm)/50-caliber gun; 2–8 × single 20-millimeter (0.79 in) Oerlikon anti-aircraft (AA) cannons and/or, 2–8 × 37-millimeter (1.46 in) M1 AA guns

SS Mary Ball was a Liberty ship built in the United States during World War II. She was named after Mary Ball, the mother of George Washington, the first President of the United States.

== Construction ==
Mary Ball was laid down on 20 July 1943, under a United States Maritime Commission (MARCOM) contract, MC hull 1534, by J.A. Jones Construction, Panama City, Florida; she was launched on 17 October 1943.

== History ==
She was allocated to United Fruit Co., on 23 November 1943. On 20 June 1946, she was laid up in the National Defense Reserve Fleet, in Mobile, Alabama. On 28 October 1971, she was sold, along with 13 other ships, for $513,800, to Union Minerals and Alloys Corporation, to be scrapped. She was removed from the fleet on 17 April 1972.

== Bibliography ==
- "Jones Construction, Panama City FL". ShipbuildingHistory.com. 13 October 2010.
- Maritime Administration. "Mary Ball". Ship History Database Vessel Status Card. U.S. Department of Transportation, Maritime Administration.
- Davies, James (May 2004). "Specifications (As-Built)" (PDF). p. 23.
- "SS Mary Ball".
