= SS Anna Dickinson =

Liberty ship of WWII

History

United States
- Name: Anna Dickinson
- Namesake: Anna Dickinson
- Owner: War Shipping Administration (WSA)
- Operator: Wessel Duval & Company
- Ordered: as type (EC2-S-C1) hull, MC hull 2493
- Awarded: 23 April 1943
- Builder: St. Johns River Shipbuilding Company, Jacksonville, Florida
- Cost: $1,009,493
- Yard number: 57
- Way number: 3
- Laid down: 26 July 1944
- Launched: 4 September 1944
- Sponsored by: Mrs. James R.P. Bell, Jr.
- Completed: 16 September 1944
- Identification: Call sign: KSSZ
- Fate: Laid up in the National Defense Reserve Fleet, Mobile, Alabama, 8 September 1949; Sold for scrapping, 14 March 1961, withdrawn from fleet, 10 April 1961

General characteristics
- Class & type: Liberty ship; type EC2-S-C1, standard
- Tonnage: 10,865 LT DWT; 7,176 GRT
- Displacement: 3,380 long tons (3,434 t) (light); 14,245 long tons (14,474 t) (max)
- Length: 441 feet 6 inches (135 m) oa; 416 feet (127 m) pp; 427 feet (130 m) lwl
- Beam: 57 feet (17 m)
- Draft: 27 ft 9.25 in (8.4646 m)
- Installed power: 2 × Oil fired 450 °F (232 °C) boilers, operating at 220 psi (1,500 kPa); 2,500 hp (1,900 kW)
- Propulsion: 1 × triple-expansion steam engine, (manufactured by General Machinery Corp., Hamilton, Ohio); 1 × screw propeller
- Speed: 11.5 knots (21.3 km/h; 13.2 mph)
- Capacity: 562,608 cubic feet (15,931 m^{3}) (grain); 499,573 cubic feet (14,146 m^{3}) (bale)
- Complement: 38–62 USMM; 21–40 USNAG
- Armament: Varied by ship; Bow-mounted 3-inch (76 mm)/50-caliber gun; Stern-mounted 4-inch (102 mm)/50-caliber gun; 2–8 × single 20-millimeter (0.79 in) Oerlikon anti-aircraft (AA) cannons and/or, 2–8 × 37-millimeter (1.46 in) M1 AA guns

SS Anna Dickinson was a Liberty ship built in the United States during World War II. She was named after Anna Dickinson, an American orator and lecturer. An advocate for the abolition of slavery and for women's rights, Dickinson was the first woman to give a political address before the United States Congress.

== Construction ==
Anna Dickinson was laid down on 26 July 1944, under a Maritime Commission (MARCOM) contract, MC hull 2493, by the St. Johns River Shipbuilding Company, Jacksonville, Florida; she was sponsored by Mrs. James R.P. Bell Jr., the daughter of Benjamin F. Crowley, vice president St.Johns River SB Co., and was launched on 4 September 1944.

== History ==
She was allocated to the Wessel Duval & Company, on 16 September 1944. On 8 September 1949, she was laid up in the National Defense Reserve Fleet, Mobile, Alabama. She was sold for scrapping, 14 March 1961, to Union Minerals & Alloys Corp., for $58,139.89. She was removed from the fleet, 10 April 1961.

== Bibliography ==
- "St. John's River Shipbuilding, Jacksonville FL". www.ShipbuildingHistory.com. 16 October 2010.
- Maritime Administration. "Anna Dickinson". Ship History Database Vessel Status Card. U.S. Department of Transportation, Maritime Administration.
- Davies, James (May 2004). "Specifications (As-Built)" (PDF). p. 23.
- "SS Anna Dickinson".
