= SS Mary Cullom Kimbro =

Liberty ship of WWII

History

United States
- Name: Mary Cullom Kimbro; Corporal Eric G. Gibson
- Namesake: Mary Cullom Kimbro; Eric G. Gibson
- Owner: War Shipping Administration (WSA)
- Operator: United Fruit Co.
- Ordered: as type (EC2-S-C5) hull, MC hull 2349
- Builder: J.A. Jones Construction, Panama City, Florida
- Cost: $1,109,568
- Yard number: 90
- Way number: 6
- Laid down: 21 February 1945
- Launched: 6 April 1945
- Completed: 24 April 1945
- Renamed: 1945
- Refit: converted to US Army repair ship, 1945
- Identification: Call sign: ANTL
- Fate: Placed in the National Defense Reserve Fleet, Hudson River Reserve Fleet, Jones Point, New York, 12 July 1949; Transferred to US Navy, removed from fleet, 25 April 1967; Scuttled, May 1970

General characteristics
- Class & type: Liberty ship; type EC2-S-C5, boxed aircraft transport
- Tonnage: 10,600 LT DWT; 7,200 GRT
- Displacement: 3,380 long tons (3,434 t) (light); 14,245 long tons (14,474 t) (max)
- Length: 441 feet 6 inches (135 m) oa; 416 feet (127 m) pp; 427 feet (130 m) lwl
- Beam: 57 feet (17 m)
- Draft: 27 ft 9.25 in (8.4646 m)
- Installed power: 2 × Oil fired 450 °F (232 °C) boilers, operating at 220 psi (1,500 kPa); 2,500 hp (1,900 kW)
- Propulsion: 1 × triple-expansion steam engine, (manufactured by Joshua Hendy Iron Works, Sunnyvale, California); 1 × screw propeller
- Speed: 11.5 knots (21.3 km/h; 13.2 mph)
- Capacity: 490,000 cubic feet (13,875 m^{3}) (bale)
- Complement: 38–62 USMM; 21–40 USNAG
- Armament: Varied by ship; Bow-mounted 3-inch (76 mm)/50-caliber gun; Stern-mounted 4-inch (102 mm)/50-caliber gun; 2–8 × single 20-millimeter (0.79 in) Oerlikon anti-aircraft (AA) cannons and/or, 2–8 × 37-millimeter (1.46 in) M1 AA guns

SS Mary Cullom Kimbro was a Liberty ship built in the United States during World War II. She was named after Mary Cullom Kimbro, a stewardess on board the passenger ship City of Birmingham when she was sunk by U-202, 1 July 1942.

== Construction ==
Mary Cullom Kimbro was laid down on 21 February 1945, under a Maritime Commission (MARCOM) contract, MC hull 2349, by J.A. Jones Construction, Panama City, Florida; she was launched on 6 April 1945.

== History ==
She was allocated to United Fruit Co., on 24 April 1945. She was converted to an Army repair ship and renamed Corporal Eric G. Gibson, 1945. On 12 July 1949, she was laid up in the National Defense Reserve Fleet, Hudson River Reserve Fleet, Jones Point, New York. She was transferred to the US Navy, 25 April 1967, for use as an Ammunition Disposal Ship. She was scuttled with obsolete ammunition off the coast of Virginia, 15 June 1967.

== Bibliography ==
- "Jones Construction, Panama City FL". www.ShipbuildingHistory.com. 13 October 2010.
- Maritime Administration. "Mary Cullom Kimbro". Ship History Database Vessel Status Card. U.S. Department of Transportation, Maritime Administration.
- Maritime Administration. "Corporal Eric G. Gibson". Ship History Database Vessel Status Card. U.S. Department of Transportation, Maritime Administration.
- Davies, James (May 2004). "Specifications (As-Built)" (PDF). p. 23.
- "SS Mary Cullom Kimbro".
- "SS Mary Cullom Kimbro". www.Wrecksite.eu. 15 February 2013.
- "Mary Cullom Kimbro". UBoat.net.
