= SS James L. Ackerson =

Liberty ship of WWII

History

United States
- Name: James L. Ackerson
- Namesake: James L. Ackerson
- Owner: War Shipping Administration (WSA)
- Operator: Wessel Duval & Company
- Ordered: as type (EC2-S-C1) hull, MC hull 2468
- Awarded: 23 April 1943
- Builder: St. Johns River Shipbuilding Company, Jacksonville, Florida
- Cost: $1,304,445
- Yard number: 32
- Way number: 2
- Laid down: 11 January 1944
- Launched: 29 February 1944
- Sponsored by: Mrs. James L.Ackerson
- Completed: 16 March 1944
- Identification: Call sign: KWCA
- Fate: Laid up in the, National Defense Reserve Fleet, Suisun Bay, California, 18 May 1946; Sold for commercial use, 22 January 1947, removed from fleet, 27 January 1947

Greece
- Name: Captain John Matarangas
- Owner: Stavros S. Niarchos
- Operator: Simpson, Spence and Young
- Fate: Sold, 1950

Greece
- Name: Artemis
- Owner: Tropis Co., Ltd.
- Fate: Scrapped, 1967

General characteristics
- Class & type: Liberty ship; type EC2-S-C1, standard
- Tonnage: 10,865 LT DWT; 7,176 GRT
- Displacement: 3,380 long tons (3,434 t) (light); 14,245 long tons (14,474 t) (max)
- Length: 441 feet 6 inches (135 m) oa; 416 feet (127 m) pp; 427 feet (130 m) lwl
- Beam: 57 feet (17 m)
- Draft: 27 ft 9.25 in (8.4646 m)
- Installed power: 2 × Oil fired 450 °F (232 °C) boilers, operating at 220 psi (1,500 kPa); 2,500 hp (1,900 kW)
- Propulsion: 1 × triple-expansion steam engine, (manufactured by General Machinery Corp., Hamilton, Ohio); 1 × screw propeller
- Speed: 11.5 knots (21.3 km/h; 13.2 mph)
- Capacity: 562,608 cubic feet (15,931 m^{3}) (grain); 499,573 cubic feet (14,146 m^{3}) (bale)
- Complement: 38–62 USMM; 21–40 USNAG
- Armament: Varied by ship; Bow-mounted 3-inch (76 mm)/50-caliber gun; Stern-mounted 4-inch (102 mm)/50-caliber gun; 2–8 × single 20-millimeter (0.79 in) Oerlikon anti-aircraft (AA) cannons and/or, 2–8 × 37-millimeter (1.46 in) M1 AA guns

SS James L. Ackerson was a Liberty ship built in the United States during World War II. She was named after James L. Ackerson, a naval constructor and the general manager and vice president of the US Shipping Board Emergency Fleet Corporation from 1918 to 1920.

== Construction ==
James L. Ackerson was laid down on 1 January 1944, under a Maritime Commission (MARCOM) contract, MC hull 2468, by the St. Johns River Shipbuilding Company, Jacksonville, Florida; she was sponsored by Mrs. James L. Ackerson, the widow of the namesake, and was launched on 29 February 1944.

== History ==
She was allocated to the Wessel Duval & Company, on 16 March 1944. On 18 May 1946, she was laid up in the National Defense Reserve Fleet, Suisun Bay, California. She was sold for commercial use, 22 January 1947, to Stavros S. Niarchos, for $544,506. She was removed from the fleet on 27 January 1947. James L. Ackerson was renamed Captain John Matarangas and flagged in Greece. She was renamed Artemis in 1952, and scrapped in Japan, in 1967.

== Bibliography ==
- "St. John's River Shipbuilding, Jacksonville FL". www.ShipbuildingHistory.com. 16 October 2010.
- Maritime Administration. "James L. Ackerson". Ship History Database Vessel Status Card. U.S. Department of Transportation, Maritime Administration.
- Davies, James (May 2004). "Specifications (As-Built)" (PDF). p. 23.
- "SS James L. Ackerson".
