= Wessel Duval & Company =

Shipping Company

Wessel, Duval & Co.
- Industry: Shipping, Transportation
- Founded: 1825 Boston, Massachusetts, United States
- Area served: World Wide
- Key people: Augustus Hemenway, Hector Beeche, Charles P. Hemenway, T. Quincy Browne
- Website: https://wesselduval.com

Ad from 1895 showing the partnership between Wessel Duval & Company and the Chile Railroad. Wessel Duval & Company offering service direct from New York City to Valparaíso, Chile.

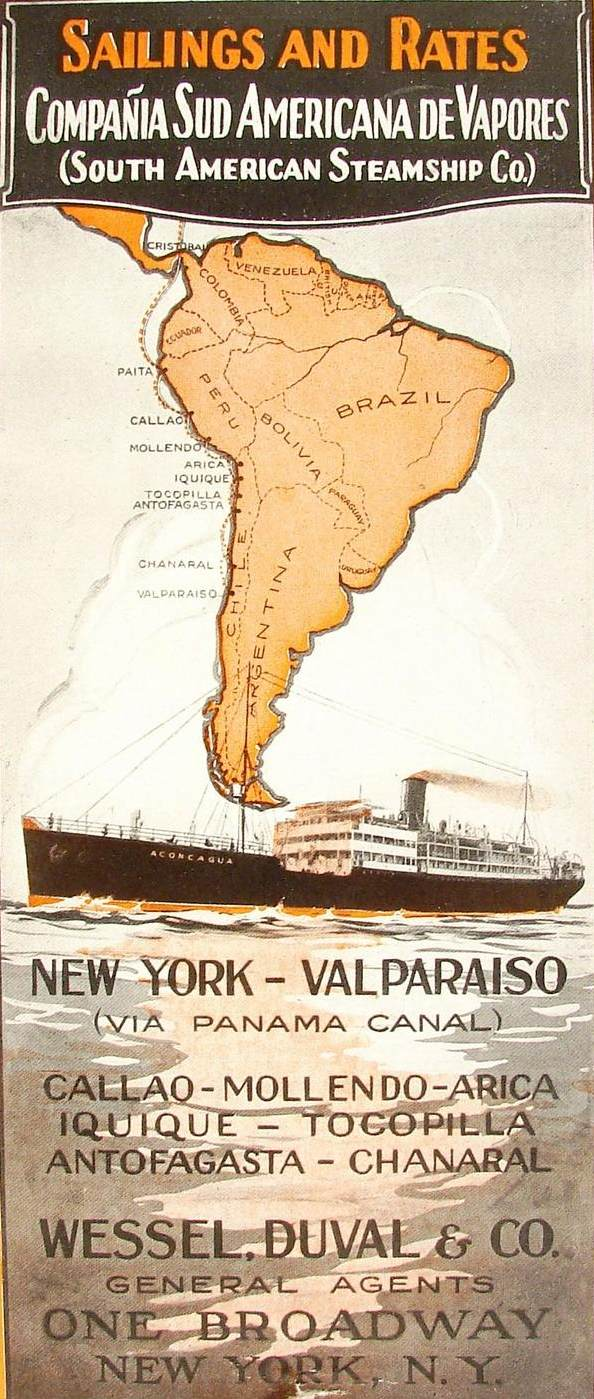
Rate-add card for Compania Sud Americanade Vapores service from Chile to New Your through agent Wesse Duval and Company from 1924

Wessel, Duval & Co. was founded in Boston, Massachusetts in 1825 Augustus Hemenway (Edward Augustus Holyoke Hemenway) (1805–1876) as Hemenway & Co.. Augustus Hemenway started the shipping company to move his timber products to markets. Augustus Hemenway had timberland in Maine and started his schooner shipping company to take timber to Eastcoast ports. Later he opened a sugar plant in Cuba, his ships would take lumber to Cuba and bring back sugar. Next, he expanded his timber products to Argentina and other Western South American ports. By 1828 the company expanded to Valparaíso, Chile. Augustus Hemenway married into a Boston merchant family, marrying Mary Tileston (1820–1894) in 1840. In 1865 Héctor Beéche (?-1914) became a partner in the firm and a subsidiary company, Wessel, Duval y Cía, was founded in Chile by Charles P. Hemenway, Augustus's brother. Charles had acted on Augustus' behalf in other matters as needed and became a partner in 1870. T. Quincy Browne became a partner in 1870 also and for a few years the firm was called Hemenway & Browne. In 1875 William Muller joined as a partner, the name returned to Hemenway & Co. Augustus Hemenway died in Cuba in 1876. The partnership continued as Hemenway & Co. till 1885. In 1885 Muller retired and Carlos Wolff joined the partnership, the company name was changed to Hemenway, Beeche and Co.. In 1888 Peter "Perdo" M. Wessel (1851–1821) joined the partnership and the company name was changed to Browne, Beeche and Co..

In 1891 a New York City office was opened on 68 Brad Street, and most key workers moved to New York. The next year the Boston office was closed. In 1896 Wolff retired and in 1897 George L. Duval (1855–1931), W. L. Parker, and q became partners. With the new partners, the company name was changed to Beeche and Co.. In 1905 T. F. Budge and Robert Jaffray became partners. In 1907 the company name was changed to Wessel, Duval & Co. In the 1900s the company moved from sailing ships to steamships and opened a new West Coast Line at 47 Cedar Street, later moved to 1 Broadway. The West Coast Line started regular service from New York City to Valparaíso and Callao, Peru. West Coast Line main cargo was railroad and mining equipment to the expanding business in Chile and Peru, along with general cargo. The Chile rail firm, Ferrocarril del Llano de Maipo in Santiago used Wessel, Duval & Co. to import their railroad equipment in 1890. The return cargo from Chile was nitrate of soda. The West Coast Line chartered steamship as needed and was the US manager and agent for other shipping lines. West Coast Line also shipped UK and US coal for coal ships and to nations. For the West coast of South America both the steamer and sail ships used the starits of Magellan, this changed on August 15, 1914, with the opening of the Panama Canal, some routes began to use the Panama Canal cutting about 10,000 miles off the trip. The outbreak of World War I changed service, some charted ships were requisition by their home country, and the United States Shipping Board, gave some ships to the Line to operate for the War effort. Normal operations did not return till 1924, all post-war work have been completed. In from 1920 to 1932, West Coast Line was the US agent for Compania Sud Americana de Vapores, the South America Steamship Company of Chile. South America Steamship Company had luxury passenger service to and from Chile and New York City, on a fleet of luxury steamers: SS Renaico, SS Aconcagua and SS Teno. During World War II Wessel Duval & Company operated ships to support the war in the Pacific War and European theatre. Wessel, Duval & Co. operated some ships in the support of Korean War in the early 1950s. As ships aged and were retired Wessel, Duval & Co. has moved into media, advertising and marketing.

== Sailing Ships ==
- Mercury
- Independence, built in 1871 at East Boston 1,073t, for Boston-Valparaíso route, sold 1895.
- Magellan, built in 1873 at East Boston 1,073t, for Boston-Valparaíso route, lost 1890
- Prospero, built in 1850 645t
- Quintero, built in 1849 at Medford, Massachusetts 631t
- San Carlos, built in 1855 at Newburyport, Massachusetts 817t (other name: John Wells )
- Sunbeam, built in 1865 at Medford, 798t
- Melona M. Knowles, 205t
- P. M. Tinker, 286t
- Hercules ~200t
- Cargador ~200t

== Iron steamships ==
- City of Santiago, built in 1875 in England, 1,983t, sold in 1880 to Bristol Line
- City of Valparaiso, built in 1875 in England, 2,022t, sold in 1880 to Bristol Line

== World War II ==
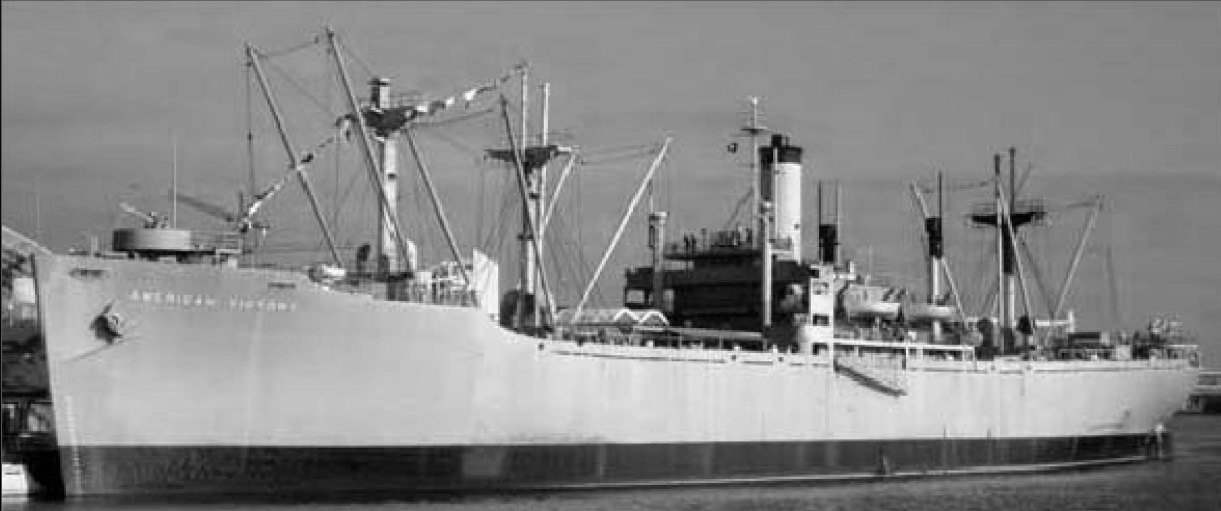
A VC2-S-AP2 type Victory ship

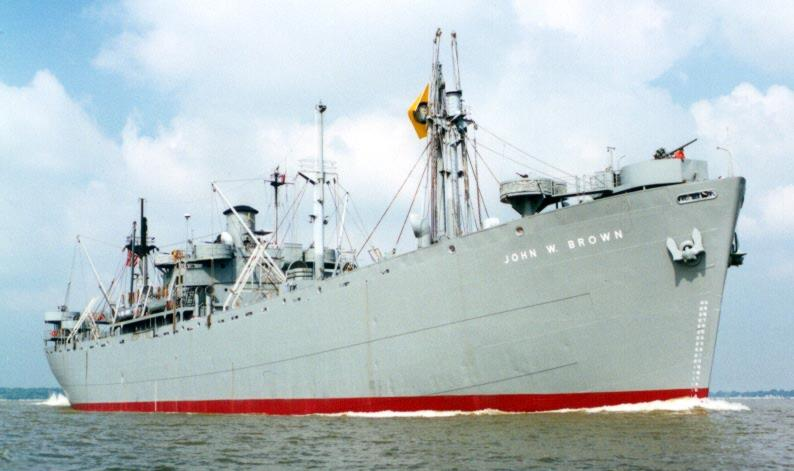
SS John W. Brown, one of four surviving Liberty ships in 2000

During World War II Wessel Duval & Company operated charter shipping to support the war. Wessel Duval & Company was active with charter shipping for the Maritime Commission and War Shipping Administration. During wartime, the Companies operated Victory ships and Liberty ships. The ship was run by its crew and the US Navy supplied United States Navy Armed Guards to man the deck guns and radio. The most common armament mounted on these merchant ships were the MK II 20mm Oerlikon autocannon and the 3"/50, 4"/50, and 5"/38 deck guns. After the war there were many surplus ships and much competition. Black Diamond Steamship Company continued to operate after the war, but closed in the 1955.

- Antioch Victory
- SS Soter Ortynsky
- SS Anna Dickinson
- SS James L. Ackerson
- SS Andrew Turnbull
- SS John Philip Sousa
- SS Thomas B. King
- Ancil F. Haines
- T. S. Gold
- Francis D. Culkin
- Francis E. Siltz
- Joseph H. Nicholson
- Joseph Warren
- Louis Marshall, sank in 1964
- Mary A. Livermore
- SS John Morgan, sank on June 1, 1943, after collided with tanker USN Montana off Cape Henry, exploded and sank
- John Roach
- James B. Duke
- SS Granville sank on March 17, 1943, torpedoed by U-338 middle of the Atlantic.
  - Korean war
- Fred E. Joyce

== See also ==
- World War II United States Merchant Navy
