= SS Murray M. Blum =

World War II Liberty ship of the United States

History

United States
- Name: Murray M. Blum
- Namesake: Murray M. Blum
- Ordered: as type (EC2-S-C1) hull, MC hull 2381
- Builder: J.A. Jones Construction, Brunswick, Georgia
- Cost: $919,943
- Yard number: 166
- Way number: 2
- Laid down: 19 September 1944
- Launched: 25 October 1944
- Sponsored by: Mrs. Sylvia Blum
- Completed: 7 November 1944
- Identification: Call Signal: KTAB
- Fate: Laid up in the National Defense Reserve Fleet, Beaumont, Texas, 17 December 1947; Laid up in the National Defense Reserve Fleet, Mobile, Alabama, 30 April 1952; Sold for scrapping, 12 March 1971

General characteristics
- Class & type: Liberty ship; type EC2-S-C1, standard
- Tonnage: 10,865 LT DWT; 7,176 GRT
- Displacement: 3,380 long tons (3,434 t) (light); 14,245 long tons (14,474 t) (max)
- Length: 441 feet 6 inches (135 m) oa; 416 feet (127 m) pp; 427 feet (130 m) lwl
- Beam: 57 feet (17 m)
- Draft: 27 ft 9.25 in (8.4646 m)
- Installed power: 2 × Oil fired 450 °F (232 °C) boilers, operating at 220 psi (1,500 kPa); 2,500 hp (1,900 kW)
- Propulsion: 1 × triple-expansion steam engine, (manufactured by General Machinery Corp., Hamilton, Ohio); 1 × screw propeller
- Speed: 11.5 knots (21.3 km/h; 13.2 mph)
- Capacity: 562,608 cubic feet (15,931 m^{3}) (grain); 499,573 cubic feet (14,146 m^{3}) (bale)
- Complement: 38–62 USMM; 21–40 USNAG
- Armament: Varied by ship; Bow-mounted 3-inch (76 mm)/50-caliber gun; Stern-mounted 4-inch (102 mm)/50-caliber gun; 2–8 × single 20-millimeter (0.79 in) Oerlikon anti-aircraft (AA) cannons and/or, 2–8 × 37-millimeter (1.46 in) M1 AA guns

SS Murray M. Blum was a Liberty ship built in the United States during World War II. She was named after Murray M. Blum, the radio operator of SS Leonidas Polk who drowned, 3 December 1943, attempting to save an overboard crewman.

== Construction ==
Murray M. Blum was laid down on 19 September 1944, under a United States Maritime Commission (MARCOM) contract, MC hull 2381, by J.A. Jones Construction, Brunswick, Georgia; she was sponsored by Mrs. Sylvia Blum, the mother of the ships namesake, and launched on 25 October 1944.

== History ==
She was allocated to Mississippi Shipping Co., Inc., on 7 November 1944. On 17 December 1947, she was laid up in the National Defense Reserve Fleet, in Beaumont, Texas. On 30 April 1952, she was laid up in the National Defense Reserve Fleet, in Mobile, Alabama. On 12 March 1971, she was sold for $44,100, to Pinto Island Metals Company, for scrapping. She was removed from the fleet on 8 April 1971.

== Bibliography ==
- "Jones Construction, Brunswick GA". ShipbuildingHistory.com. 13 October 2010.
- "Liberty Ships – World War II".
- Maritime Administration. "Murray M. Blum". Ship History Database Vessel Status Card. U.S. Department of Transportation, Maritime Administration.
- Davies, James (May 2004). "Specifications (As-Built)" (PDF). p. 23.
- "SS Murray M. Blum".
