= James Duke (footballer) =

Scottish footballer

Personal information
- Full name: James Duke
- Place of birth: Mauchline, Scotland
- Position: Centre-half

Senior career*
Years	Team	Apps	(Gls)
1919–1921	Grimsby Town	6	(0)
1921–1922	Scunthorpe & Lindsey United		
1922–1923	Bristol City	0	(0)
1923	Exeter City	1	(0)
- * Club domestic league appearances and goals

James Duke was a Scottish professional footballer who played as a centre-half.
