= J.A. Jones Construction =

Heavy construction company headquartered in North Carolina

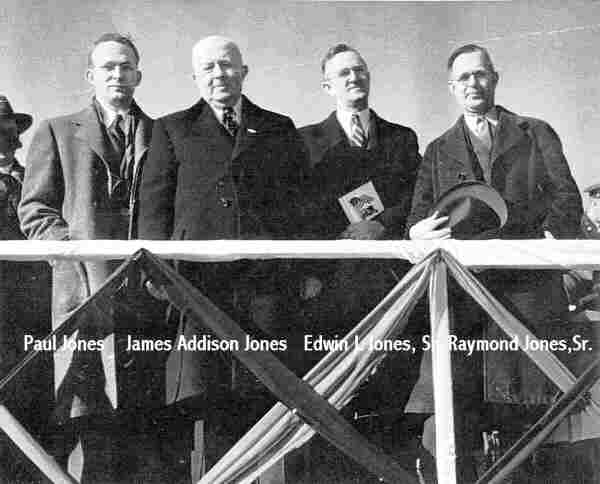
- Members of the J.A. Jones Construction Company during World War II.
- Industry: Construction
- Founded: 1890s
- Defunct: 2003
- Fate: Liquidation
- Headquarters: Charlotte, North Carolina
- Key people: James Addison Jones, founder

J.A. Jones Construction was a heavy construction company headquartered in Charlotte, North Carolina. Operating internationally since the 1950s, it was acquired by the Germany company Philipp Holzmann AG in 1979. In 2003, the company ceased operations due to the failure of its parent company.

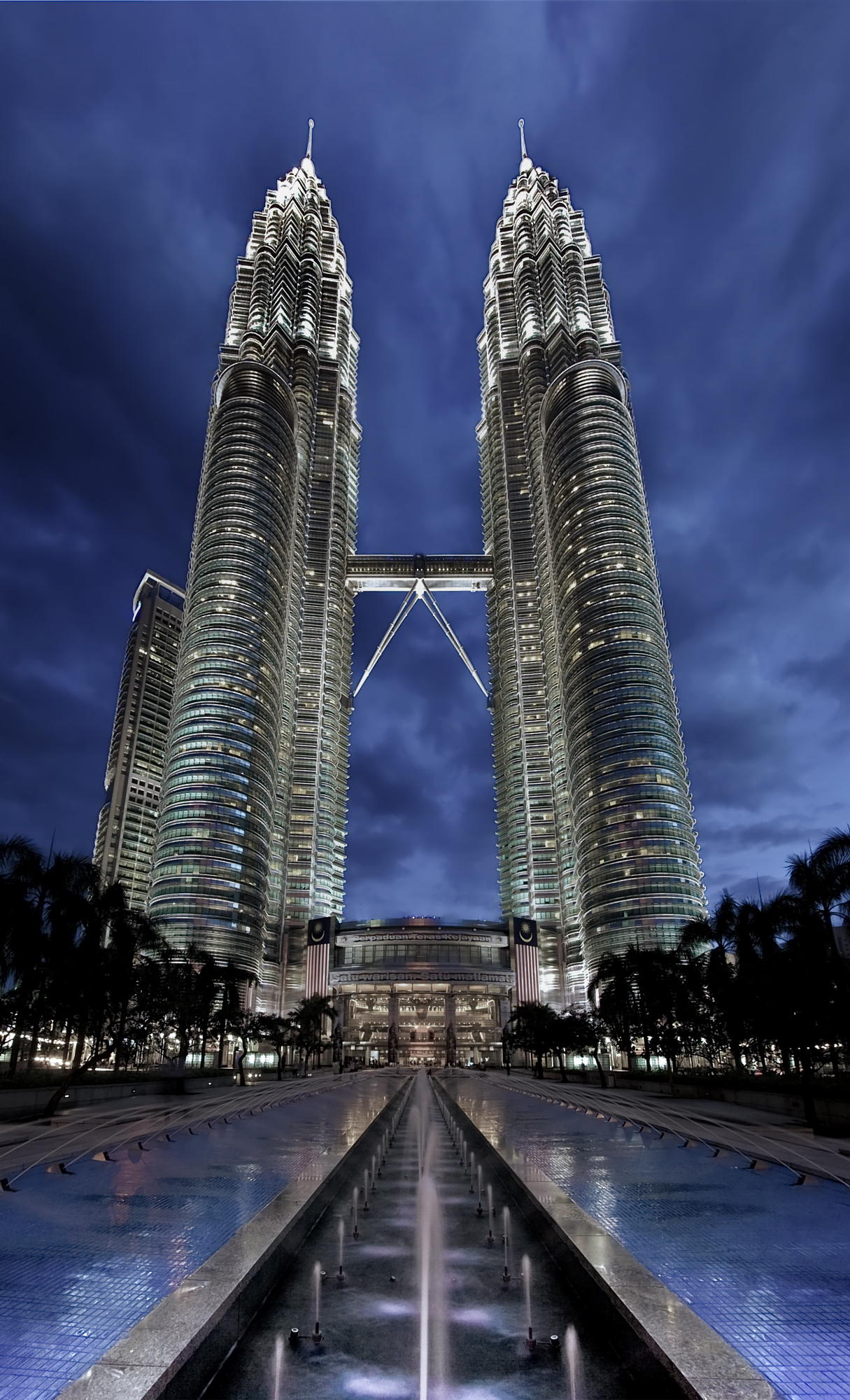
J.A. Jones Construction assisted in the building of the Petronas Towers in Malaysia

== History ==
The company was founded by James Addison Jones in the 1890s. One of Jones' early landmark projects was the twelve-story Independence Building, Charlotte's first "skyscraper" and the soon to be first office of J.A. Jones Construction.

In 1930, the company won a major contract to build a new military airbase in the Canal Zone in Panama.

During World War II, the company built 212 cargo ships and tankers and was a substantial builder of Liberty ships in support of the war effort. It also built Camp Shelby in Mississippi as well as K-25 and K-27, production plants for manufacturing Uranium-235 at the Clinton Engineer Works at Oak Ridge, Tennessee.

In August 1965, The U.S. Navy Bureau of Yards and Docks selected J.A. Jones Construction to be a part of the construction consortium, RMK-BRJ, formed to perform $2 billion in infrastructure construction in Vietnam in support of the Vietnam War build-up. This contract was closed out in 1972 and the consortium disbanded.

In 1979, the company was acquired by Philipp Holzmann A.G. and under that company's ownership Jones went on to build the 88-story Petronas Towers, for a while the tallest buildings in the world. However Holzman got into financial difficulties in the late 1990s and this led to the bankruptcy of Jones in 2003 and subsequent sale of Jones' subsidiaries as going concerns.

Subsidiary	Buyer	Purchase price
J.A. Jones/Tompkins Builders	Turner Construction	$10 million
J.A. Jones Environmental Services Division	Dick Corporation	unknown
Lockwood Greene	CH2M Hill	$95.5 million
J.A. Jones International	Fluor Corp.	$4 million
Rea Construction Co. (now Rea Contracting)	Lane Construction Corp.	$34 million
