= Atlantic Reserve Fleet, Wilmington =

US Atlantic Reserve Fleet, in Wilmington, North Carolina

Coordinates: 34.229479°N 77.982916°W

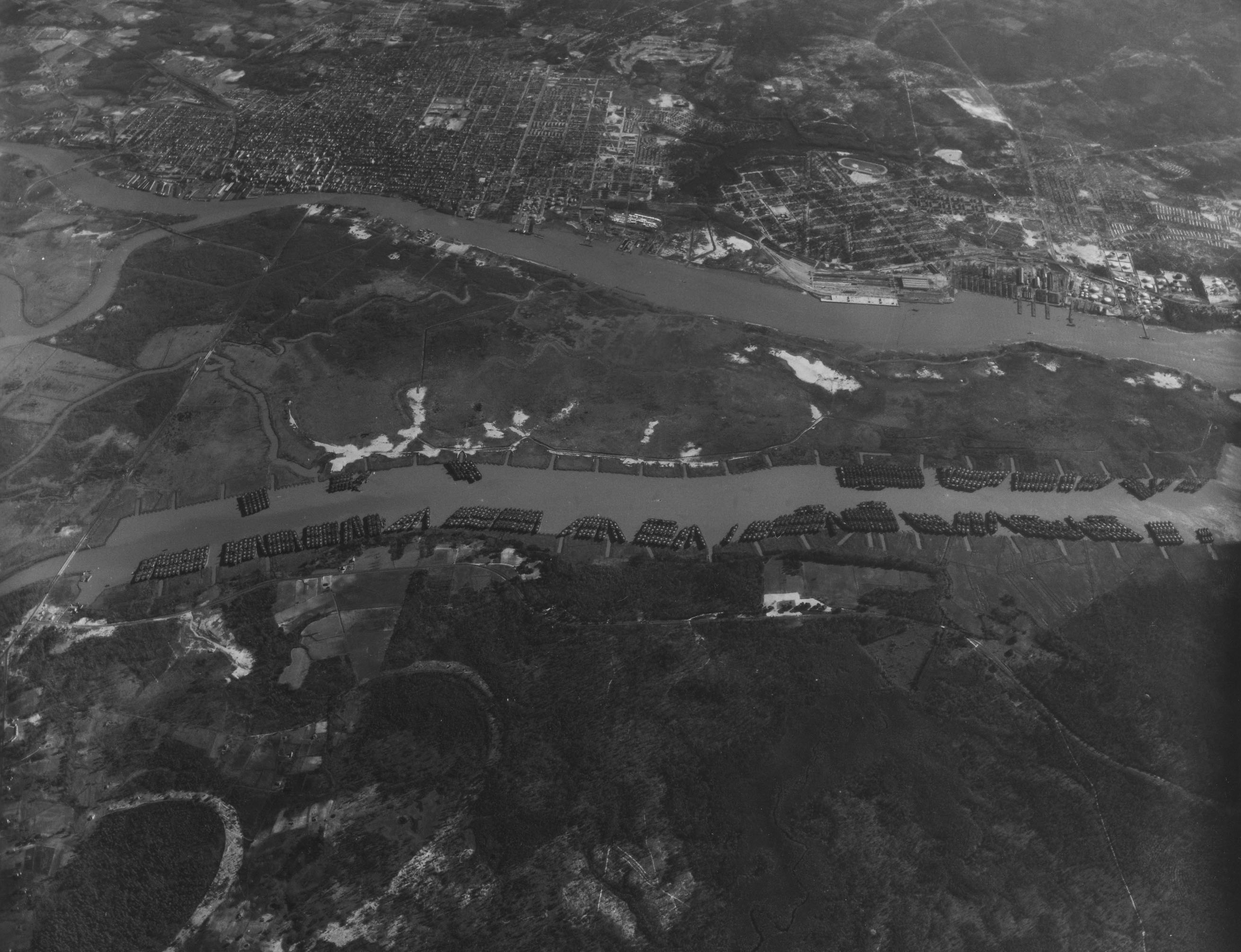
Maritime Commission National Defense Reserve Fleet Berth Area Wilmington N.C. Looking East, January 21st 1952.

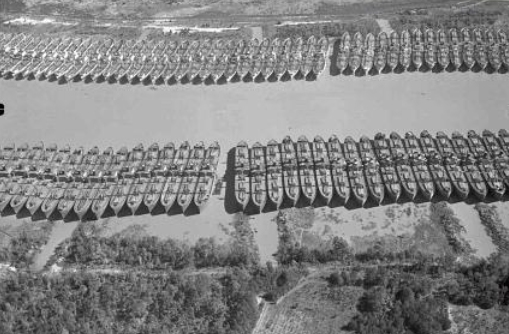
Atlantic Reserve Fleet, Wilmington on the Brunswick River in 1954

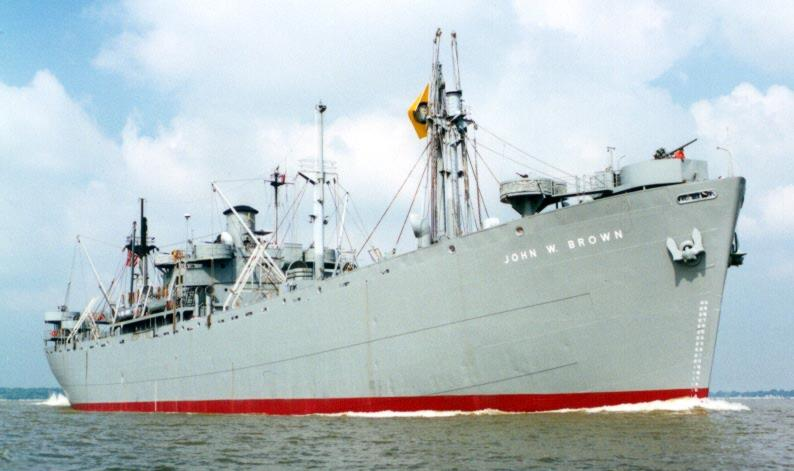
A Liberty ship, the most common ship stored at the Wilmington Reserve Fleet

Atlantic Reserve Fleet, Wilmington was part of the United States Navy reserve fleets in Wilmington, North Carolina. The reserve fleet was at and overflowed out of the former North Carolina Shipbuilding Company in the dredged out Brunswick River. The ships lined both sides of the Brunswick River. The freshwater of the river made a good spot to store ships. The reserve fleet was opened in 1946 to store the now many surplus ships after World War II. The mothball fleet was mostly cargo ships used in the merchant marine navy. When opened it had mostly cargo ships and a few troop ships. At its peak it had 300 Victory ships and Liberty ships, many of which had been built at the nearby former North Carolina Shipbuilding Company Shipyard. Some ships in the fleet were reactivated for the Korean War and Vietnam War. Atlantic Reserve Fleet, Wilmington closed in 1962, with the last ship removed in February 27, 1970. The ships in the fleet were either scrapped, used as targets or move to the James River Reserve Fleet and Beaumont Reserve Fleet.

== Notable former ships ==
- USS Boulder Victory (AK-227) became one of many Seagoing cowboys ships doing livestock war relief, late in life the University of California conducted thermal stress tests on her.
- SS Edward W. Burton removed and converted to USS Interceptor (AGR-8) a Guardian-class radar picket ship for the US Navy in 1955.
- SS James F. Harrell removed and converted to USS Picket (YAGR-7) a Guardian radar picket ship for the US Navy in 1955.
- SS William J. Riddle removed and converted to USS Tracer (AGR-15) a Guardian radar picket ship for the US Navy in 1955.
- SS James W. Wheeler removed and converted to USS Searcher (AGR-4) a Guardian radar picket ship for the US Navy in 1955.
- SS Dwight W. Morrow was the last ship to depart Atlantic Reserve Fleet, Wilmington, she was scrapped in February 1970.

== See also ==
- Newport News Shipbuilding
