= USS Investigator =

Guardian-class radar picket ship

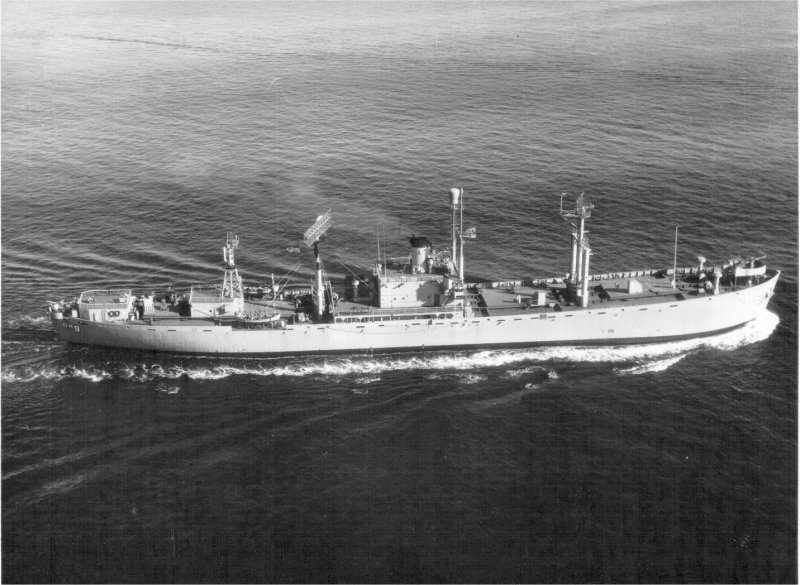
- USS Investigator (AGR-9), under way 11 September 1960, location unknown.

History

United States
- Name: Charles A. Draper
- Namesake: Charles A. Draper
- Owner: War Shipping Administration (WSA)
- Operator: Polarus Steamship Co. Inc.
- Ordered: as type (EC2-S-C5) hull, MC hull 2336
- Builder: J.A. Jones Construction, Panama City, Florida
- Cost: $1,131,702
- Yard number: 77
- Way number: 4
- Laid down: 28 November 1944
- Launched: 9 January 1945
- Sponsored by: Mrs. E. L. Cills
- Completed: 24 January 1945
- Identification: Call sign: ANFB
- Fate: Placed in the, National Defense Reserve Fleet, James River Reserve Fleet, Lee Hall, Virginia, 26 October 1945; Acquired by US Navy, 2 July 1956

United States
- Name: Investigator
- Namesake: One who makes an inquiry or examination
- Commissioned: 16 January 1957
- Decommissioned: 3 March 1965
- Reclassified: Guardian-class radar picket ship
- Refit: Charleston Naval Shipyard, Charleston, South Carolina
- Stricken: 1 April 1965
- Identification: Hull symbol: YAGR-9 (1956–1958); Hull symbol: AGR-9 (1958–1965); Call sign: NTAA
- Fate: Placed in National Defense Reserve Fleet, Hudson River Reserve Fleet, Jones Point, New York, 1 April 1965; Sold for scrapping, 15 May 1971

General characteristics
- Class & type: Liberty ship; type EC2-S-C5, boxed aircraft transport
- Tonnage: 10,600 LT DWT; 7,200 GRT
- Displacement: 3,380 long tons (3,434 t) (light); 14,245 long tons (14,474 t) (max)
- Length: 441 feet 6 inches (135 m) oa; 416 feet (127 m) pp; 427 feet (130 m) lwl
- Beam: 57 feet (17 m)
- Draft: 27 ft 9.25 in (8.4646 m)
- Installed power: 2 × Oil fired 450 °F (232 °C) boilers, operating at 220 psi (1,500 kPa); 2,500 hp (1,900 kW)
- Propulsion: 1 × triple-expansion steam engine, (manufactured by Joshua Hendy Iron Works, Sunnyvale, California); 1 × screw propeller
- Speed: 11.5 knots (21.3 km/h; 13.2 mph)
- Capacity: 490,000 cubic feet (13,875 m^{3}) (bale)
- Complement: 38–62 USMM; 21–40 USNAG
- Armament: Varied by ship; Bow-mounted 3-inch (76 mm)/50-caliber gun; Stern-mounted 4-inch (102 mm)/50-caliber gun; 2–8 × single 20-millimeter (0.79 in) Oerlikon anti-aircraft (AA) cannons and/or, 2–8 × 37-millimeter (1.46 in) M1 AA guns

General characteristics (US Navy refit)
- Class & type: Guardian-class radar picket ship
- Capacity: 443,646 US gallons (1,679,383 L; 369,413 imp gal) (fuel oil); 68,267 US gallons (258,419 L; 56,844 imp gal) (diesel); 15,082 US gallons (57,092 L; 12,558 imp gal) (fresh water); 1,326,657 US gallons (5,021,943 L; 1,104,673 imp gal) (fresh water ballast)
- Complement: 13 officers; 138 enlisted
- Armament: 2 × 3 inches (76 mm)/50 caliber guns

USS Investigator (AGR/YAGR-9) was a Guardian-class radar picket ship, converted from a Liberty Ship, acquired by the US Navy in 1954. She was reconfigured as a radar picket ship and assigned to radar picket duty in the North Atlantic Ocean as part of the Distant Early Warning Line.

== Construction ==
Investigator (YAGR-9) was laid down on 28 November 1944, under a Maritime Commission (MARCOM) contract, MC hull 2336, as the Liberty Ship Charles A. Draper, by J.A. Jones Construction, Panama City, Florida. She was launched 9 January 1945; sponsored by Mrs. E. L. Cills; and delivered 24 January 1945, to the Polarus Steamship Co., Inc.

== Service history ==
The ship carried replacement aircraft and cargo until the end of the war. She entered the National Defense Reserve Fleet, James River Reserve Fleet, Lee Hall, Virginia, 26 October 1945.

After a brief period of service in 1947, she entered the Reserve Fleet at Mobile, Alabama, until she was acquired by the US Navy, 2 July 1956. She was converted to a radar picket ship at the Charleston Navy Yard, Charleston, South Carolina, and commissioned Investigator (YAGR-9), 16 January 1957.

Equipped with the latest in air search and tracking systems, the ship conducted her shakedown training in the Caribbean, and departed Guantanamo Bay, for her new home port, Davisville, Rhode Island. Investigator began her operational pattern of three- to four-week cruises in the North Atlantic Ocean as the seaward extension of the Continental Air Defense Command's (CONAD) air early warning system. Operating with search aircraft, she could detect, track, and report aircraft at long ranges, and could control high speed US interceptor aircraft and direct them to targets.

The ship was reclassified AGR-9, effective 28 September 1958. She continued radar picket station duties for CONAD, detecting and tracking inbound airborne objects and controlling jet interceptor aircraft until decommissioned 29 March 1965.

== Decommissioning ==
Her name was struck from the Navy List 1 April 1965. She was transferred the same day to the US Maritime Commission (MARCOM) and entered the Hudson River Reserve Fleet, Jones Point, New York, where she remained until sold for scrapping in Spain, 15 May 1971.

== Military awards and honors ==
Investigator's crew was eligible for the following medals:

- National Defense Service Medal
- Navy Expeditionary Medal (2 awards)

== See also ==
- United States Navy
- Radar picket

== Bibliography ==
- "Investigator". Dictionary of American Naval Fighting Ships. Navy Department, Naval History and Heritage Command. 22 July 2015. This article incorporates text from this source, which is in the public domain.
- "Jones Construction, Panama City FL". www.ShipbuildingHistory.com. 13 October 2010.
- Davies, James (May 2004). "Specifications (As-Built)" (PDF). p. 23.
- "SS Charles A. Draper".
- "USS Investigator (AGR-9)". NavSource. 11 April 2019.
