= USS Locator =

US Navy ship

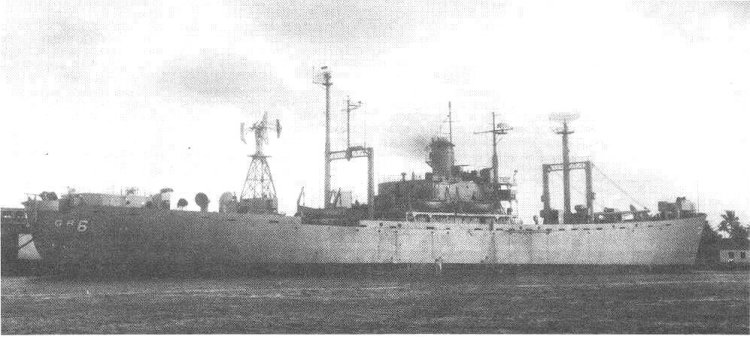
- USS Locator (AGR-6), under way, date and location unknown.

History

United States
- Name: Frank O. Peterson
- Namesake: Frank O. Peterson
- Owner: War Shipping Administration (WSA)
- Operator: International Freighting Corp.
- Ordered: as type (EC2-S-C5) hull, MC hull 2347
- Builder: J.A. Jones Construction, Panama City, Florida
- Cost: $1,030,726
- Yard number: 88
- Way number: 3
- Laid down: 9 February 1945
- Launched: 23 March 1945
- Sponsored by: Mrs. Evelyn Flynn
- Completed: 6 April 1945
- Identification: Call sign: ANTC
- Fate: Placed in the, National Defense Reserve Fleet, 8 October 1947; Acquired by US Navy, 10 June 1955

United States
- Name: Locator
- Namesake: One who discovers a position
- Commissioned: 21 January 1956
- Decommissioned: 9 August 1965
- Reclassified: Guardian-class radar picket ship
- Refit: Charleston Naval Shipyard, Charleston, South Carolina
- Stricken: 1 September 1965
- Identification: Hull symbol: YAGR-6 (1956–1958); Hull symbol: AGR-6 (1958–1965); Call sign: NZRW
- Fate: Placed in National Defense Reserve Fleet, Hudson River Reserve Fleet, Jones Point, New York, 1 September 1965; Sold for scrapping, 4 January 1975

General characteristics
- Class & type: Liberty ship; type EC2-S-C5, boxed aircraft transport
- Tonnage: 10,600 LT DWT; 7,200 GRT
- Displacement: 3,380 long tons (3,434 t) (light); 14,245 long tons (14,474 t) (max)
- Length: 441 feet 6 inches (135 m) oa; 416 feet (127 m) pp; 427 feet (130 m) lwl
- Beam: 57 feet (17 m)
- Draft: 27 ft 9.25 in (8.4646 m)
- Installed power: 2 × Oil fired 450 °F (232 °C) boilers, operating at 220 psi (1,500 kPa); 2,500 hp (1,900 kW)
- Propulsion: 1 × triple-expansion steam engine, (manufactured by General Machinery Corp., Hamilton, Ohio); 1 × screw propeller
- Speed: 11.5 knots (21.3 km/h; 13.2 mph)
- Capacity: 490,000 cubic feet (13,875 m^{3}) (bale)
- Complement: 38–62 USMM; 21–40 USNAG
- Armament: Varied by ship; Bow-mounted 3-inch (76 mm)/50-caliber gun; Stern-mounted 4-inch (102 mm)/50-caliber gun; 2–8 × single 20-millimeter (0.79 in) Oerlikon anti-aircraft (AA) cannons and/or, 2–8 × 37-millimeter (1.46 in) M1 AA guns

General characteristics (US Navy refit)
- Class & type: Guardian-class radar picket ship
- Capacity: 443,646 US gallons (1,679,383 L; 369,413 imp gal) (fuel oil); 68,267 US gallons (258,419 L; 56,844 imp gal) (diesel); 15,082 US gallons (57,092 L; 12,558 imp gal) (fresh water); 1,326,657 US gallons (5,021,943 L; 1,104,673 imp gal) (fresh water ballast)
- Complement: 13 officers; 138 enlisted
- Armament: 2 × 3 inches (76 mm)/50 caliber guns

USS Locator (AGR/YAGR-6) was a Guardian-class radar picket ship, converted from a Liberty Ship, acquired by the US Navy in 1955. She was obtained from the National Defense Reserve Fleet and reconfigured as a radar picket ship and assigned to radar picket duty in the North Pacific Ocean as part of the Distant Early Warning Line.

== Construction ==
Locator (YAGR-6) was laid down on 9 February 1945, under a Maritime Commission (MARCOM) contract, MC hull 2347, as the Liberty Ship Frank O. Peterson, by J.A. Jones Construction, Panama City, Florida. She was launched 23 March 1945, sponsored by Mrs. Evelyn Flynn, and delivered on 6 April 1945, to International Freighting Corp.

== Service history ==
She was acquired by the Navy from the US Maritime Administration (MARAD) on 10 June 1955. She was converted to a radar picket ship at the Charleston Naval Shipyard, Charleston, South Carolina, and commissioned Locator on 21 January 1956.

Departing Charleston, 21 February, Locator steamed through the Panama Canal, and arrived San Francisco, California, 17 March. After a period of repair and training she was assigned to a radar picket station off the US West Coast. Coordinating operations with the Continental and North American Air Defense Commands, she detected, tracked, and reported all air contacts that came within her radar surveillance.

Locator was reclassified AGR-6 on 28 September 1958, and for the next 7 years continued the constant vigil at sea, ever ready to sound the signal of enemy air attack. Her operations at sea were alternated by in-port replenishment periods at San Francisco.

== Decommissioning ==
After contributing 9 years to the defense of the United States. Locator decommissioned at San Francisco, 9 August 1965. Her name was struck from the Naval Register 1 September 1965, and was sold for scrapping, 4 January 1975.

== Military awards and honors ==
Scanner's crew was eligible for the following medals:

- National Defense Service Medal

== Bibliography ==
- "Locator". Dictionary of American Naval Fighting Ships. Navy Department, Naval History and Heritage Command. This article incorporates text from this source, which is in the public domain.
- "Jones Construction, Panama City FL". www.ShipbuildingHistory.com. 13 October 2010.
- Davies, James (May 2004). "Specifications (As-Built)" (PDF). p. 23.
- "SS Frank O. Peterson".
- "USS Locator (AGR-6)". NavSource. 22 July 2016.
