= USS Vigil =

American warship

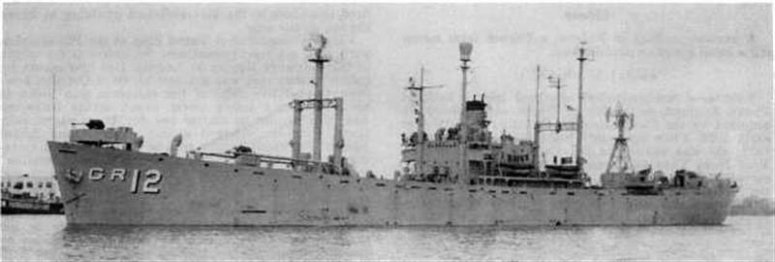
- USS Vigil (YAGR-12), 2 April 1957, newly converted from a Liberty-type merchant cargo ship. Masts and kingposts support search and height-finding radars and a club-like Tacan aircraft navigation beacon.

History

United States
- Name: Raymond Van Brogen
- Namesake: Raymond Van Brogen
- Owner: War Shipping Administration (WSA)
- Operator: A.H.Bull & Co.Inc.
- Ordered: as type (EC2-S-C5) hull, MC hull 2339
- Builder: J.A. Jones Construction, Panama City, Florida
- Cost: $1,132,781
- Yard number: 80
- Way number: 2
- Laid down: 14 December 1944
- Launched: 27 January 1945
- Sponsored by: Mrs. Mary Anne Durham
- Completed: 10 February 1945
- Identification: Call sign: ANFF
- Fate: Placed in the, National Defense Reserve Fleet, Mobile, Alabama, 1947; Acquired by US Navy, June 1956

United States
- Name: Vigil
- Commissioned: 5 March 1957
- Decommissioned: 3 March 1965
- Reclassified: Guardian-class radar picket ship
- Refit: Philadelphia Naval Shipyard, Philadelphia, Pennsylvania
- Stricken: 1 April 1965
- Identification: Hull symbol: YAGR-12 (1956–1958); Hull symbol: AGR-12 (1958–1965)
- Fate: Placed in National Defense Reserve Fleet, Hudson River Reserve Fleet, Jones Point, New York, 1 April 1965; Sold for scrapping, 23 November 1970

General characteristics
- Class & type: Liberty ship; type EC2-S-C5, boxed aircraft transport
- Tonnage: 10,600 LT DWT; 7,200 GRT
- Displacement: 3,380 long tons (3,434 t) (light); 14,245 long tons (14,474 t) (max)
- Length: 441 feet 6 inches (135 m) oa; 416 feet (127 m) pp; 427 feet (130 m) lwl
- Beam: 57 feet (17 m)
- Draft: 27 ft 9.25 in (8.4646 m)
- Installed power: 2 × Oil fired 450 °F (232 °C) boilers, operating at 220 psi (1,500 kPa); 2,500 hp (1,900 kW)
- Propulsion: 1 × triple-expansion steam engine, (manufactured by Filer and Stowell, Milwaukee, Wisconsin); 1 × screw propeller
- Speed: 11.5 knots (21.3 km/h; 13.2 mph)
- Capacity: 490,000 cubic feet (13,875 m^{3}) (bale)
- Complement: 38–62 USMM; 21–40 USNAG
- Armament: Varied by ship; Bow-mounted 3-inch (76 mm)/50-caliber gun; Stern-mounted 4-inch (102 mm)/50-caliber gun; 2–8 × single 20-millimeter (0.79 in) Oerlikon anti-aircraft (AA) cannons and/or, 2–8 × 37-millimeter (1.46 in) M1 AA guns

General characteristics (US Navy refit)
- Class & type: Guardian-class radar picket ship
- Capacity: 443,646 US gallons (1,679,383 L; 369,413 imp gal) (fuel oil); 68,267 US gallons (258,419 L; 56,844 imp gal) (diesel); 15,082 US gallons (57,092 L; 12,558 imp gal) (fresh water); 1,326,657 US gallons (5,021,943 L; 1,104,673 imp gal) (fresh water ballast)
- Complement: 13 officers; 138 enlisted
- Armament: 2 × 3 inches (76 mm)/50 caliber guns

USS Vigil (AGR/YAGR-12) was a Guardian-class radar picket ship, converted from a Liberty Ship, acquired by the US Navy in 1956. She was reconfigured as a radar picket ship and assigned to radar picket duty in the North Atlantic Ocean as part of the Distant Early Warning Line.

== Construction ==
Vigil (YAGR-12) was laid down on 14 December 1944, under a Maritime Commission (MARCOM) contract, MC hull 2339, as the Liberty Ship Raymond Van Brogan, by J.A. Jones Construction, Panama City, Florida. She was launched 27 January 1945; sponsored by Mrs. Mary Anne Durham, wife of manager machinery JAJCC; and delivered 10 February 1945, to the War Shipping Administration.

== Service history ==
=== Merchant service ===
Following a shakedown cruise in the Gulf of Mexico, the ship transited the Panama Canal, on 19 February, and headed for Terminal Island, California, where she was turned over to A.H.Bull & Co.Inc., for operation under contract to the War Shipping Administration.

She performed several resupply missions in the Pacific Ocean theater, carrying aircraft as well as other materiel and some troops.

Following the end of World War II, the War Shipping Administration transferred her contract to the Waterman Steamship Corporation, which firm operated her from Mobile, Alabama. In the summer of 1947, Raymond Van Brogan was taken out of service and berthed with the National Defense Reserve Fleet at Mobile.

=== U.S. Navy service ===
Nine years later, in June 1956, she was brought out of the US Maritime Commission's (MARCOM) reserve fleet for conversion to a radar picket ship and active service with the Navy. She was moved to Philadelphia, Pennsylvania, where she completed her conversion at the naval shipyard.

On 7 August 1956, she received a new name and her Navy hull designation to become Vigil (YAGR-12). She completed conversion early in 1957, and was placed in service on 5 March 1957.

During Vigil's eight-year naval career, she was assigned to the Continental Air Defense Command (CONAD) and served as one of that organization's radar picket ships operating as seaward extensions of its Contiguous Radar Coverage System. The ship operated out of Davisville, Rhode Island, during her entire period of service, and spent on the average of 200 days per year engaged in picket patrols in waters off the coast of New England.

On 28 September 1958, she was redesignated AGR-12, thereby dropping her yard craft designation and becoming a commissioned auxiliary.

== Decommissioning ==
On 3 March 1965, Vigil was placed out of commission. Her name was struck from the Navy List on 1 April 1965, and she was returned to the MARCOM for lay up with the Hudson River Reserve Fleet, Jones Point, New York. On 23 November 1970, she was sold to the Spanish firm, Revalorizacion de Materiales, for scrapping.

== Honors and awards ==
Vigil's crew was eligible for the following medals:

- Navy Expeditionary Medal (2-Cuba)
- National Defense Service Medal

== Bibliography ==
- "Vigil". Dictionary of American Naval Fighting Ships. Navy Department, Naval History and Heritage Command. 23 October 2015. This article incorporates text from this source, which is in the public domain.
- "Jones Construction, Panama City FL". www.ShipbuildingHistory.com. 13 October 2010.
- Davies, James (May 2004). "Specifications (As-Built)" (PDF). p. 23.
- "SS Raymond Van Brogen".
- "USS Vigil (AGR-12)". NavSource. 11 April 2019.
