= USS Outpost =

US naval vessel

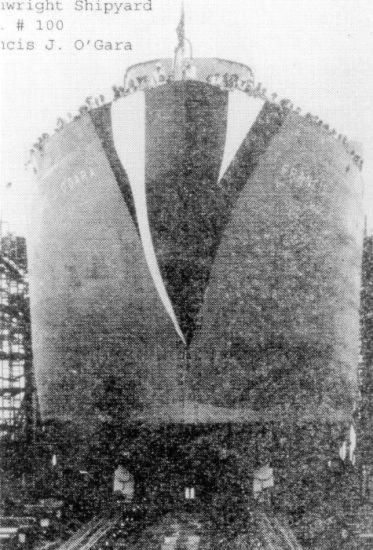
- SS Francis J O'Gara on the building ways at J. A. Jones Construction Co. Inc., Panama City, Florida, prior to launching, 8 June 1945.

History

United States
- Name: Francis J O'Gara
- Namesake: Francis J O'Gara
- Owner: War Shipping Administration (WSA)
- Operator: Calmer Steamship Corp.
- Ordered: as type (EC2-S-C5) hull, MC hull 3140
- Builder: J.A. Jones Construction, Panama City, Florida
- Laid down: 14 April 1945
- Launched: 8 June 1945
- Completed: 30 June 1945
- Fate: Placed in National Defense Reserve Fleet, Hudson River Reserve Fleet, Jones Point, New York, 4 June 1946; Acquired by US Navy, 22 May 1956
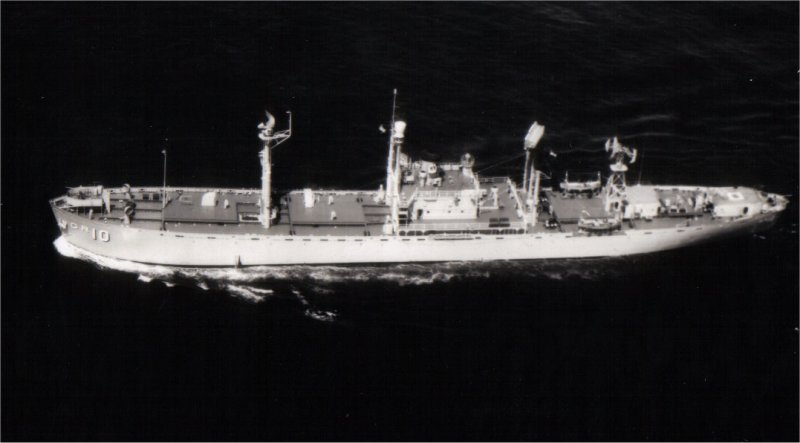
- USS Outpost (AGR-10) underway, 19 June 1963, location unknown.

United States
- Name: Outpost
- Namesake: A security detachment to protect against enemy enterprises
- Commissioned: 6 February 1957
- Decommissioned: 1 July 1965
- Reclassified: Guardian-class radar picket ship
- Refit: Philadelphia Naval Shipyard, Philadelphia, Pennsylvania
- Stricken: 1 July 1965
- Identification: Hull symbol: YAGR-10 (1957–1958); Hull symbol: AGR-10 (1958–1970)
- Fate: Placed in National Defense Reserve Fleet, Hudson River Reserve Fleet, Jones Point, New York, 1 July 1965; Sold for scrapping, 17 February 1971

General characteristics
- Class & type: Liberty ship; type EC2-S-C5, boxed aircraft transport
- Tonnage: 10,600 LT DWT; 7,200 GRT
- Displacement: 3,380 long tons (3,434 t) (light); 14,245 long tons (14,474 t) (max)
- Length: 441 feet 6 inches (135 m) oa; 416 feet (127 m) pp; 427 feet (130 m) lwl
- Beam: 57 feet (17 m)
- Draft: 27 ft 9.25 in (8.4646 m)
- Installed power: 2 × Oil fired 450 °F (232 °C) boilers, operating at 220 psi (1,500 kPa); 2,500 hp (1,900 kW)
- Propulsion: 1 × triple-expansion steam engine, (manufactured by Filer and Stowell, Milwaukee, Wisconsin); 1 × screw propeller
- Speed: 11.5 knots (21.3 km/h; 13.2 mph)
- Capacity: 490,000 cubic feet (13,875 m^{3}) (bale)
- Complement: 38–62 USMM; 21–40 USNAG
- Armament: Varied by ship; Bow-mounted 3-inch (76 mm)/50-caliber gun; Stern-mounted 4-inch (102 mm)/50-caliber gun; 2–8 × single 20-millimeter (0.79 in) Oerlikon anti-aircraft (AA) cannons and/or, 2–8 × 37-millimeter (1.46 in) M1 AA guns

General characteristics (US Navy refit)
- Class & type: Guardian-class radar picket ship
- Capacity: 443,646 US gallons (1,679,383 L; 369,413 imp gal) (fuel oil); 68,267 US gallons (258,419 L; 56,844 imp gal) (diesel); 15,082 US gallons (57,092 L; 12,558 imp gal) (fresh water); 1,326,657 US gallons (5,021,943 L; 1,104,673 imp gal) (fresh water ballast)
- Complement: 13 officers; 138 enlisted
- Armament: 2 × 3 inches (76 mm)/50 caliber guns

USS Outpost (AGR/YAGR-10) was a Guardian-class radar picket ship, converted from a Liberty Ship, acquired by the US Navy in 1956. She was reconfigured as a radar picket ship and assigned to radar picket duty in the North Atlantic Ocean as part of the Distant Early Warning Line.

== Construction ==
Outpost (YAGR–10) was laid down on 14 April 1945, under a Maritime Commission (MARCOM) contract, MC hull 3140, as the Liberty Ship Francis J. O'Gara, by J.A. Jones Construction, Panama City, Florida. She was launched 8 June 1945, and delivered 30 June 1945, to the Calmer Steamship Corp.

== Service history ==
=== Merchant service ===
The Calmer Steamship Corp. operated Francis J. O'Gara for MARCOM from 30 June 1945 until 4 June 1946. Francis J. O'Gara's cruises during this period included one to the US West Coast of the United States and one to various European ports.

On 4 June 1946 Francis J. O'Gara was laid up in the Hudson River Reserve Fleet, Jones Point, New York, of MARCOM. From 28 January 1947 until 14 January 1948, Francis J. O'Gara was operated by the Waterman Steamship Company and then the South Atlantic Steamship Company. During this period she made cruises to Europe, the Near East, and the Orient. On 20 January 1948, Francis J. O'Gara was laid up in MARCOM's Mobile, Alabama, reserve fleet.

=== US Navy service ===
On 22 May 1956, the US Navy acquired Francis J. O'Gara to be converted into an Ocean Station Radar Ship.

Francis J. O'Gara was towed from Mobile, to the Philadelphia Naval Shipyard, Philadelphia, Pennsylvania, where conversion was begun to equip her with the electronic detection equipment and communication gear necessary for her role with the Continental Air Defense Command. She was assigned the Navy hull number YAGR–10 and commissioned Outpost, 6 February 1957.

After shakedown training out of Guantanamo Bay, Cuba, Outpost reported to her homeport, Davisville, Rhode Island, 3 June 1957. On 28 June, the ship steamed seaward on her first patrol and on 30 June, relieved Brister on picket station. The ship returned to Davisville, 19 July, but by 24 July, was underway for another patrol setting the pattern of patrols interrupted by short periods in port.

Outpost made a total of six patrols in 1957. These patrols continued into 1958. Outpost's designation was changed to AGR–10 28 September 1958.

During the first half of 1961, Outpost steamed on station. But in August she steamed south to Florida and the Bahamas. From October 1961 to January 1962, she underwent overhaul at Boston, Massachusetts.

Outpost continued her Atlantic patrols in 1962, buttoning up for wartime steaming during the Cuban Missile Crisis. The onset of 1963 found Outpost steaming on station as before. In late July the ship visited Halifax, Nova Scotia.

From August through the end of 1963, Outpost maintained a record of no misses in reporting air contacts. She visited Halifax, again in November before putting into her homeport for the holidays. Early in 1964, she resumed her patrols and continued this pattern of operation until decommissioning 1 July 1965.

== Decommissioning ==
She was returned to the US Maritime Administration (MARAD) 4 February 1966, and entered the Hudson River Reserve Fleet, Jones Point, New York. She was sold 17 February 1971, for scrapping in Spain.

== Military awards and honors ==
Outpost's personnel qualified for the following medals:

- Navy Expeditionary Medal (5-Cuba)
- National Defense Service Medal
- Armed Forces Expeditionary Medal (1-Cuba)

== See also ==
- United States Navy
- Radar picket

== Bibliography ==
- "Outpost". Dictionary of American Naval Fighting Ships. Navy Department, Naval History and Heritage Command. 18 August 2015. This article incorporates text from this source, which is in the public domain.
- "Jones Construction, Panama City FL". www.ShipbuildingHistory.com. 13 October 2010.
- Davies, James (May 2004). "Specifications (As-Built)" (PDF). p. 23.
- "USS Oupost (AGR-10)". NavSource. 9 October 2015.
