= USS Tracer =

US navy ship

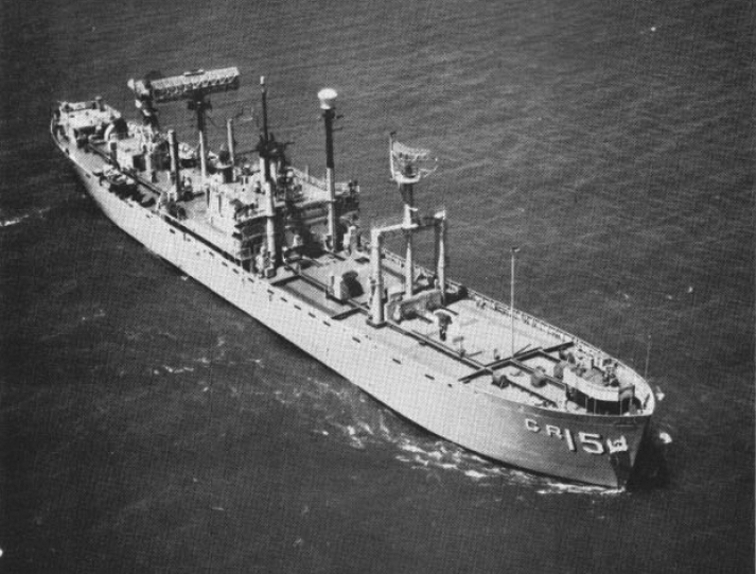
- USS Tracer (AGR-15) underway, date and location unknown.

History

United States
- Name: William J. Riddle
- Namesake: William J. Riddle
- Owner: War Shipping Administration (WSA)
- Operator: Moore McCormack Lines, Inc.
- Ordered: as type (EC2-S-C5) hull, MC hull 2340
- Builder: J.A. Jones Construction, Panama City, Florida
- Cost: $1,068,836
- Yard number: 81
- Way number: 5
- Laid down: 24 December 1944
- Launched: 31 January 1945
- Sponsored by: Mrs. Marion Harders
- Completed: 15 February 1945
- Identification: Call sign: ANIJ
- Fate: Placed in the, National Defense Reserve Fleet, Wilmington, North Carolina, 16 December 1946; Acquired by US Navy, 21 May 1957

United States
- Name: Interrupter (1958); Tracer (1959–1965)
- Namesake: One who breaks in upon some action, hinders, or obstructs; One that traces, tracks down, or searches out
- Commissioned: 16 October 1958
- Decommissioned: 7 July 1965
- Renamed: 4 September 1959
- Reclassified: Guardian-class radar picket ship
- Refit: Charleston Naval Shipyard, Charleston, South Carolina
- Stricken: 1 September 1965
- Identification: Hull symbol: AGR-15; Call sign: NNTS
- Fate: Placed in National Defense Reserve Fleet, Suisun Bay Reserve Fleet, Suisun Bay, California, 4 February 1966; Sold for non-transportation use, 15 July 1974

United States
- Name: Unisea
- Fate: Placed in commercial service as a fish processing plant at Unalaska, Alaska; Sold for scrapping, 2000

General characteristics
- Class & type: Liberty ship; type EC2-S-C5, boxed aircraft transport
- Tonnage: 10,600 LT DWT; 7,200 GRT
- Displacement: 3,380 long tons (3,434 t) (light); 14,245 long tons (14,474 t) (max)
- Length: 441 feet 6 inches (135 m) oa; 416 feet (127 m) pp; 427 feet (130 m) lwl
- Beam: 57 feet (17 m)
- Draft: 27 ft 9.25 in (8.4646 m)
- Installed power: 2 × Oil fired 450 °F (232 °C) boilers, operating at 220 psi (1,500 kPa); 2,500 hp (1,900 kW)
- Propulsion: 1 × triple-expansion steam engine, (manufactured by Joshua Hendy Iron Works, Sunnyvale, California); 1 × screw propeller
- Speed: 11.5 knots (21.3 km/h; 13.2 mph)
- Capacity: 490,000 cubic feet (13,875 m^{3}) (bale)
- Complement: 38–62 USMM; 21–40 USNAG
- Armament: Varied by ship; Bow-mounted 3-inch (76 mm)/50-caliber gun; Stern-mounted 4-inch (102 mm)/50-caliber gun; 2–8 × single 20-millimeter (0.79 in) Oerlikon anti-aircraft (AA) cannons and/or, 2–8 × 37-millimeter (1.46 in) M1 AA guns

General characteristics (US Navy refit)
- Class & type: Guardian-class radar picket ship
- Capacity: 443,646 US gallons (1,679,383 L; 369,413 imp gal) (fuel oil); 68,267 US gallons (258,419 L; 56,844 imp gal) (diesel); 15,082 US gallons (57,092 L; 12,558 imp gal) (fresh water); 1,326,657 US gallons (5,021,943 L; 1,104,673 imp gal) (fresh water ballast)
- Complement: 13 officers; 138 enlisted
- Armament: 2 × 3 inches (76 mm)/50 caliber guns

USS Tracer (AGR-15) was a Guardian-class radar picket ship, converted from a Liberty Ship, acquired by the US Navy in 1957. She was reconfigured as a radar picket ship and assigned to radar picket duty in the North Pacific Ocean as part of the Distant Early Warning Line.

Because of the closeness of the sound of names issued for radar picket ships at the time, Interrupter had her name changed by the Navy to Tracer so as not to confuse her with USS Interdictor (AGR-13) and USS Interpreter (AGR-14)

== Construction ==
Tracer (AGR-15) was laid down on 24 December 1944, under a Maritime Commission (MARCOM) contract, MC hull 2340, as the Liberty Ship Dudley H. Thomas, by J.A. Jones Construction, Panama City, Florida. She was launched 31 January 1945; sponsored by Mrs. Marion Harders; and delivered 21 February 1945, to the Moore McCormack Lines, Inc.

== Service history ==
=== Merchant service ===
William J. Riddle operated with Moore-McCormack Lines and the Waterman Steamship Corporation from 1945 to 1947. When hostilities ended in the Far East in mid-August 1945, she was steaming from Hawaii to the Philippines.

Converted to a cattle carrier the following year, she operated as such through the end of 1946. Changed back to a dry cargo carrier by March 1947, she voyaged to European and Mediterranean ports until the summer of 1947, when she was laid up in MARCOM's James River Reserve Fleet, Lee Hall, Virginia. She remained there for 10 years.

=== US Navy service ===
The Navy selected William J. Riddle for conversion to a radar picket ship in May 1957. Towed to the Charleston Naval Shipyard, Charleston, South Carolina, conversion work began on 24 May 1957. Renamed Interrupter, and classified as AGR-15, she was commissioned at Charleston, 16 October 1958.

Following shakedown in Guantanamo Bay, Cuba, and post-shakedown availability at her conversion yard, Interrupter sailed for the Pacific Ocean. She transited the Panama Canal, on 26 January 1959, and arrived at her home port, San Francisco, California, on 12 February, the sixth AGR to join newly formed Radar Picket Squadron 1.

Fitted out with the latest radar detection equipment, Interrupter and her seven Guardian-class radar picket ship sister ships were designed to serve as the seaborne eyes of the North American Air Defense Command (CONAD), the naval link in the chain of early-warning stations covering the Pacific approaches to the United States. Her mission was to "detect, report, and track enemy airborne threats approaching by overseas routes and to control the intercepts used to destroy such threats."

Before putting to sea for her first patrol, she conducted training evolutions with U.S. Air Force officers embarked on board for familiarization with the ship's mission. In addition, Interrupter's, officers and men familiarized themselves with the Air Force's part in this vital mission. On 6 March 1959, Interrupter sailed from San Francisco on her first barrier patrol.

On 4 September 1959, Interrupter was renamed Tracer to eliminate confusion with some of her sister ships with similarly sounding names.

Between 1959 and 1965, Tracer conducted patrols at sea, at various picket stations in the Western Contiguous Radar Line. The ship proved to be an efficient vessel and received awards for administrative and operational efficiency on several occasions. As more sophisticated early-warning systems came into operational use, the need for the AGR's diminished accordingly.

== Decommissioning ==
Deactivated in 1965, Tracer's name was struck from the Navy List on 1 September 1965. She was then transferred to the US Maritime Commission (MARCOM) and laid up at the Suisun Bay Reserve Fleet, Suisun Bay, California, where she remained until sold, 15 July 1974. Before being scrapped in China in 2000, Tracer, renamed Unisea, served as a fish processing plant in Unalaska, Alaska.

== Honors and awards ==
Tracer's crew was eligible for the following medals:

- National Defense Service Medal

== Bibliography ==
- "Tracer". Dictionary of American Naval Fighting Ships. Navy Department, Naval History and Heritage Command. 30 September 2015. This article incorporates text from this source, which is in the public domain.
- "Jones Construction, Panama City FL". www.ShipbuildingHistory.com. 13 October 2010.
- Davies, James (May 2004). "Specifications (As-Built)" (PDF). p. 23.
- "SS William J. Riddle".
- "USS Tracer (AGR-15)". NavSource. 8 February 2019.
