= USS Searcher =

United States radar picket ship

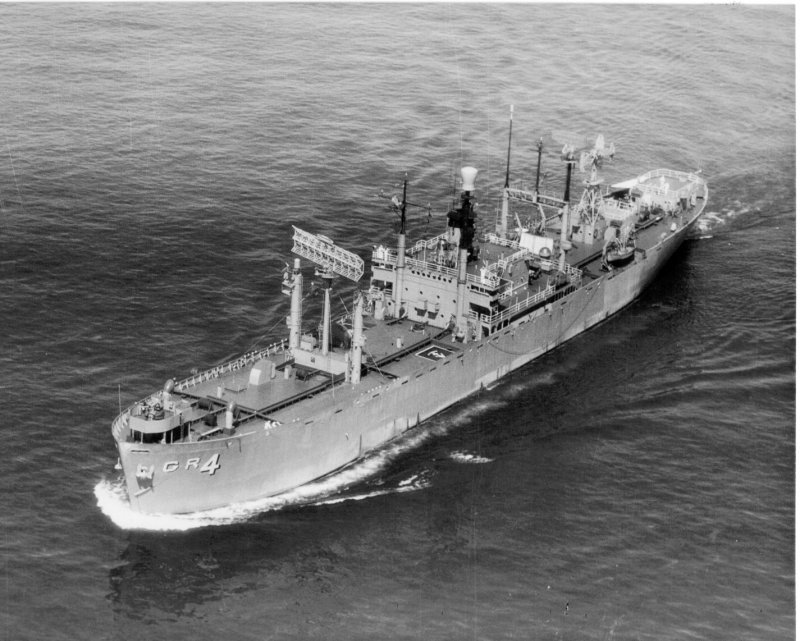
- USS Searcher (AGR-4), underway, 9 September 1960, location unknown.

History

United States
- Name: James W. Wheeler
- Namesake: James W. Wheeler
- Owner: War Shipping Administration (WSA)
- Operator: Calmar Steamship Company
- Ordered: as type (EC2-S-C5) hull, MC hull 2338
- Builder: J.A. Jones Construction, Panama City, Florida
- Cost: $1,127,547
- Yard number: 79
- Way number: 1
- Laid down: 11 December 1944
- Launched: 23 January 1945
- Sponsored by: Mrs. R. D. Turnage
- Completed: 5 February 1945
- Identification: Call sign: ANFD
- Fate: Placed in the, James River Reserve Fleet, Lee Hall, Virginia, 29 October 1945; Withdrawn from reserve fleet and leased to Grace Lines Inc., 4 February 1947
- Fate: Placed in the, National Defense Reserve Fleet, Wilmington, North Carolina, 1 October 1947; Acquired by US Navy, 15 September 1954

United States
- Name: Searcher
- Commissioned: 2 April 1955
- Decommissioned: 1 July 1965
- Reclassified: Guardian-class radar picket ship
- Refit: Charleston Naval Shipyard, Charleston, South Carolina
- Stricken: 1 July 1965
- Identification: Hull symbol: YAGR-4 (1956–1958); Hull symbol: AGR-4 (1958–1970)
- Fate: Placed in National Defense Reserve Fleet, Hudson River Reserve Fleet, Jones Point, New York; Sold for scrapping, delivered, 31 May 1970

General characteristics
- Class & type: Liberty ship; type EC2-S-C5, boxed aircraft transport
- Tonnage: 10,600 LT DWT; 7,200 GRT
- Displacement: 3,380 long tons (3,434 t) (light); 14,245 long tons (14,474 t) (max)
- Length: 441 feet 6 inches (135 m) oa; 416 feet (127 m) pp; 427 feet (130 m) lwl
- Beam: 57 feet (17 m)
- Draft: 27 ft 9.25 in (8.4646 m)
- Installed power: 2 × Oil fired 450 °F (232 °C) boilers, operating at 220 psi (1,500 kPa); 2,500 hp (1,900 kW)
- Propulsion: 1 × triple-expansion steam engine, (manufactured by Joshua Hendy Iron Works, Sunnyvale, California); 1 × screw propeller
- Speed: 11.5 knots (21.3 km/h; 13.2 mph)
- Capacity: 490,000 cubic feet (13,875 m^{3}) (bale)
- Complement: 38–62 USMM; 21–40 USNAG
- Armament: Varied by ship; Bow-mounted 3-inch (76 mm)/50-caliber gun; Stern-mounted 4-inch (102 mm)/50-caliber gun; 2–8 × single 20-millimeter (0.79 in) Oerlikon anti-aircraft (AA) cannons and/or, 2–8 × 37-millimeter (1.46 in) M1 AA guns

General characteristics (US Navy refit)
- Class & type: Guardian-class radar picket ship
- Capacity: 443,646 US gallons (1,679,383 L; 369,413 imp gal) (fuel oil); 68,267 US gallons (258,419 L; 56,844 imp gal) (diesel); 15,082 US gallons (57,092 L; 12,558 imp gal) (fresh water); 1,326,657 US gallons (5,021,943 L; 1,104,673 imp gal) (fresh water ballast)
- Complement: 13 officers; 138 enlisted
- Armament: 2 × 3 inches (76 mm)/50 caliber guns

USS Searcher (YAGR/AGR-4) was a Guardian-class radar picket ship, converted from a Liberty Ship, acquired by the US Navy in 1954. She was obtained from the National Defense Reserve Fleet and reconfigured as a radar picket ship and assigned to radar picket duty in the North Atlantic Ocean as part of the Distant Early Warning Line.

== Construction ==
Searcher (YAGR-4) was laid down on 11 December 1944, under a Maritime Commission (MARCOM) contract, MC hull 2338, as the Liberty Ship James W. Wheeler, by J.A. Jones Construction, Panama City, Florida. She was launched on 23 January 1945; sponsored by Mrs. R. D. Turnage; and delivered on 5 February 1945 to the Calmar Steamship Company.

== Service history ==
She was acquired by the Navy from the Maritime Administration on 15 September 1954 and reclassified YAGR-4 in August 1954. She was converted to a radar picket ship at the Charleston Naval Shipyard, Charleston, South Carolina, and commissioned Searcher on 2 April 1955.

Searcher departed Charleston, 16 May 1955, for Newport, Rhode Island, where, after shakedown, she reported for duty with the seaward extension of America's early warning defense system. She reported on station for her first patrol on 5 July 1955.

Fitted with sophisticated electronic search and tracking equipment, Searcher could locate, track, and report enemy aircraft at great distances, and control high-speed interceptor aircraft in event of an attack. She also carried out weather reporting duties during her three-to-four-week-long cruises.

On 13 November 1955, Searcher was damaged by an engine room fire which burned for six and a half hours before being extinguished with the aid of two other ships. Her patrols were otherwise uneventful. She was reclassified AGR-4 effective 28 September 1958; and, during the Cuban Missile Crisis in 1962, she operated at sea for 60 out of 67 days.

In March 1964 she lost her screw at sea while steaming in a heavy gale 450 miles ESE of Cape Cod and was later taken in tow first by the US Coast Guard Cutter Yakutat and then by a US Navy tug.

== Decommissioning ==
On 1 July 1965, Searcher was decommissioned, struck from the Navy List and transferred to the Maritime Administration (MARAD). She was laid up in the Hudson River Reserve Fleet until sold for scrapping on 7 August 1970, to the North American Smelting Co., Wilmington, Delaware.

== Military awards and honors ==
Searcher's crew was eligible for the following medals:

- National Defense Service Medal
- Navy Expeditionary Medal (2 awards)

== See also ==
- United States Navy
- Radar picket

== Bibliography ==
- "Searcher". Dictionary of American Naval Fighting Ships. Navy Department, Naval History and Heritage Command. 8 September 2015. This article incorporates text from this source, which is in the public domain.
- "Jones Construction, Panama City FL". www.ShipbuildingHistory.com. 13 October 2010.
- Davies, James (May 2004). "Specifications (As-Built)" (PDF). p. 23.
- "SS James W. Wheeler".
- "USS Searcher (AGR-4)". NavSource. 2 February 2018.
