= USS Lookout =

Guardian-class radar picket ship

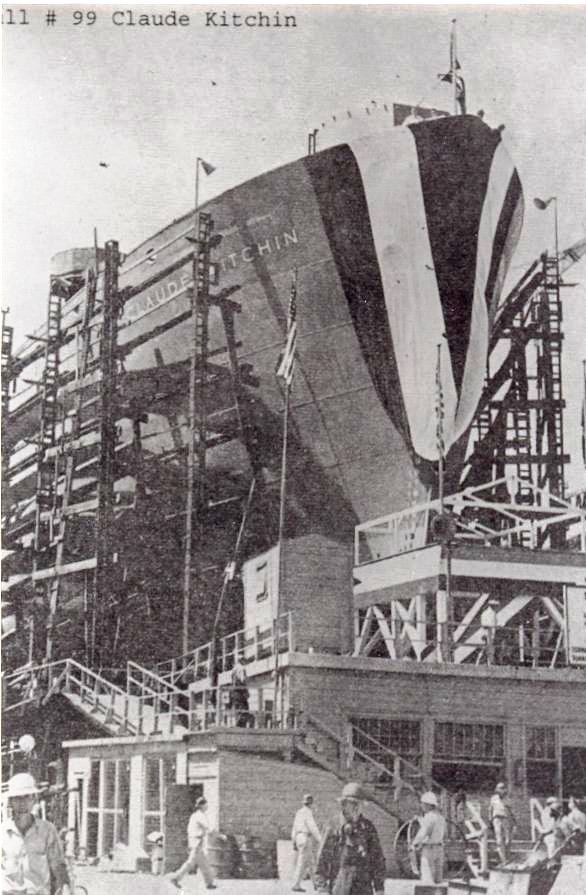
- SS Claude B. Kitchin on the building ways at J. A. Jones Construction Co. Inc., Panama City, FL., prior to launching, 24 May 1945.

History

United States
- Name: Claude B. Kitchin
- Namesake: Claude B. Kitchin
- Owner: War Shipping Administration (WSA)
- Operator: United Fruit Co.
- Ordered: as type (EC2-S-C5) hull, MC hull 3139
- Builder: J.A. Jones Construction, Panama City, Florida
- Cost: $818,469
- Yard number: 99
- Way number: 4
- Laid down: 5 April 1945
- Launched: 24 May 1945
- Sponsored by: Mrs. F. D. Burge
- Completed: 25 June 1945
- Identification: Call sign: ANZJ
- Fate: Placed in the, National Defense Reserve Fleet; Acquired by US Navy, 13 August 1954
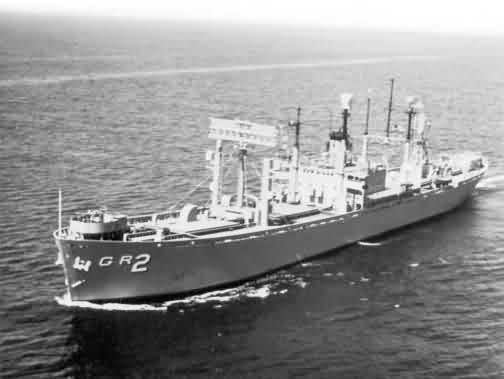
- USS Lookout (AGR-2) underway, date and location unknown.

United States
- Name: Lookout
- Namesake: A careful watching for someone or something
- Commissioned: 5 March 1955
- Decommissioned: 12 July 1965
- Reclassified: Guardian-class radar picket ship
- Refit: Charleston Naval Shipyard, Charleston, South Carolina
- Stricken: 1 September 1965
- Identification: Hull symbol: YAGR-2 (1956–1958); Hull symbol: AGR-2 (1958–1970)
- Fate: Placed in National Defense Reserve Fleet, Hudson River Reserve Fleet, Jones Point, New York; Sold for scrapping, scrapped, November 1970

General characteristics
- Class & type: Liberty ship; type EC2-S-C5, boxed aircraft transport
- Tonnage: 10,600 LT DWT; 7,200 GRT
- Displacement: 3,380 long tons (3,434 t) (light); 14,245 long tons (14,474 t) (max)
- Length: 441 feet 6 inches (135 m) oa; 416 feet (127 m) pp; 427 feet (130 m) lwl
- Beam: 57 feet (17 m)
- Draft: 27 ft 9.25 in (8.4646 m)
- Installed power: 2 × Oil fired 450 °F (232 °C) boilers, operating at 220 psi (1,500 kPa); 2,500 hp (1,900 kW)
- Propulsion: 1 × triple-expansion steam engine, (manufactured by Filer and Stowell, Milwaukee, Wisconsin); 1 × screw propeller
- Speed: 11.5 knots (21.3 km/h; 13.2 mph)
- Capacity: 490,000 cubic feet (13,875 m^{3}) (bale)
- Complement: 38–62 USMM; 21–40 USNAG
- Armament: Varied by ship; Bow-mounted 3-inch (76 mm)/50-caliber gun; Stern-mounted 4-inch (102 mm)/50-caliber gun; 2–8 × single 20-millimeter (0.79 in) Oerlikon anti-aircraft (AA) cannons and/or, 2–8 × 37-millimeter (1.46 in) M1 AA guns

General characteristics (US Navy refit)
- Class & type: Guardian-class radar picket ship
- Capacity: 443,646 US gallons (1,679,383 L; 369,413 imp gal) (fuel oil); 68,267 US gallons (258,419 L; 56,844 imp gal) (diesel); 15,082 US gallons (57,092 L; 12,558 imp gal) (fresh water); 1,326,657 US gallons (5,021,943 L; 1,104,673 imp gal) (fresh water ballast)
- Complement: 13 officers; 138 enlisted
- Armament: 2 × 3 inches (76 mm)/50 caliber guns

USS Lookout (YAGR/AGR-2) was a Guardian-class radar picket ship, converted from a Liberty Ship, acquired by the US Navy in 1954. She was reconfigured as a radar picket ship and assigned to radar picket duty in the North Atlantic Ocean as part of the Distant Early Warning Line.

== Construction ==
Lookout (YAGR-2) was laid down on 5 April 1945, under a Maritime Commission (MARCOM) contract, MC hull 3139, as the Liberty Ship Claude Kitchin, by J.A. Jones Construction, Panama City, Florida. She was launched 24 May 1945; sponsored by Mrs. F. D. Burge; and delivered 25 June 1945, to the United Fruit Company.

== Service history ==
She was soon placed into the National Defense Reserve Fleet until 13 August 1954, when she was acquired by the US Navy. She was converted to a radar picket ship at the Charleston Navy Yard, Charleston, South Carolina, and commissioned Lookout (YAGR-2), 5 March 1955.

After shakedown off Newport, Rhode Island, Lookout was assigned to radar picket duty in the 1st Naval District. From 1956 to 1965, she operated on the Atlantic Ocean perimeter of the radar defense net established around the United States to warn of surprise air attack. On 28 September 1958, her classification was changed to AGR-2. Lookout's periods of 20 to 30 days at sea were alternated with inport replenishment at Davisville, Rhode Island.

By the time she completed her 10th year of service in the spring of 1965, Lookout had distinguished herself in the defense of the Nation.

== Decommissioning ==
She arrived Bayonne, New Jersey, 23 June, and decommissioned there 12 July 1965. Her name was struck from the Naval Register 1 September 1965. Lookout was transferred to the National Defense Reserve Fleet, Hudson River Reserve Fleet, Jones Point, New York, where she remained until she was sold for scrap in 1970, to a scrapping firm in Spain.

== Military awards and honors ==
Lookout's crew was eligible for the following medals:

- National Defense Service Medal
- Navy Expeditionary Medal (2 awards)

== See also ==
- United States Navy
- Radar picket

== Bibliography ==
- "Lookout". Dictionary of American Naval Fighting Ships. Navy Department, Naval History and Heritage Command. This article incorporates text from this source, which is in the public domain.
- "Jones Construction, Panama City FL". www.ShipbuildingHistory.com. 13 October 2010.
- Davies, James (May 2004). "Specifications (As-Built)" (PDF). p. 23.
- "SS Claude B. Kitchin".
- "USS Lookout (AGR-2)". NavSource. 9 October 2015.
