= USS Guardian (YAGR-1) =

Guardian-class radar picket ship

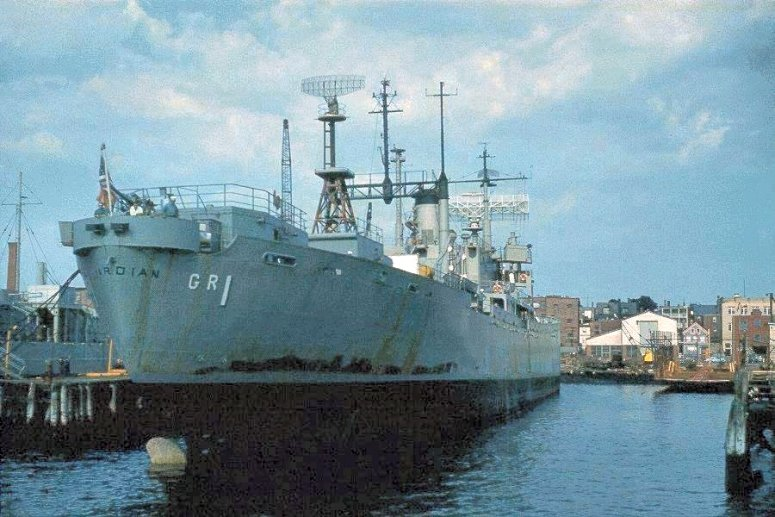
- USS Guardian (AGR-1), moored pierside, Boston, July 1960.

History

United States
- Name: James G. Squires
- Namesake: James G. Squires
- Owner: War Shipping Administration (WSA)
- Operator: Waterman Steamship Corp.
- Ordered: as type (EC2-S-C5) hull, MC hull 3137
- Builder: J.A. Jones Construction, Panama City, Florida
- Cost: $857,562
- Yard number: 97
- Way number: 5
- Laid down: 20 March 1945
- Launched: 8 May 1945
- Sponsored by: Mrs. Elisa Broome
- Completed: 31 May 1945
- Identification: Call sign: ANZI
- Fate: Placed in the, James River Reserve Fleet, Lee Hall, Virginia, 5 October 1945; Acquired by US Navy, 1954

United States
- Name: Guardian
- Namesake: One who guards or protects
- Commissioned: 1 February 1955
- Decommissioned: 28 July 1965
- Reclassified: Guardian-class radar picket ship
- Refit: Charleston Naval Shipyard, Charleston, South Carolina
- Home port: Newport, Rhode Island
- Identification: Hull symbol: YAGR-1 (1956–1958); Hull symbol: AGR-1 (1958–1970)
- Fate: Placed in National Defense Reserve Fleet; Sold for scrapping, 23 November 1970, withdrawn from fleet, 21 December 1970, scrapped, September 1971

General characteristics
- Class & type: Liberty ship; type EC2-S-C5, boxed aircraft transport
- Tonnage: 10,600 LT DWT; 7,200 GRT
- Displacement: 3,380 long tons (3,434 t) (light); 14,245 long tons (14,474 t) (max)
- Length: 441 feet 6 inches (135 m) oa; 416 feet (127 m) pp; 427 feet (130 m) lwl
- Beam: 57 feet (17 m)
- Draft: 27 ft 9.25 in (8.4646 m)
- Installed power: 2 × Oil fired 450 °F (232 °C) boilers, operating at 220 psi (1,500 kPa); 2,500 hp (1,900 kW)
- Propulsion: 1 × triple-expansion steam engine, (manufactured by Joshua Hendy Iron Works, Sunnyvale, California); 1 × screw propeller
- Speed: 11.5 knots (21.3 km/h; 13.2 mph)
- Capacity: 490,000 cubic feet (13,875 m^{3}) (bale)
- Complement: 38–62 USMM; 21–40 USNAG
- Armament: Varied by ship; Bow-mounted 3-inch (76 mm)/50-caliber gun; Stern-mounted 4-inch (102 mm)/50-caliber gun; 2–8 × single 20-millimeter (0.79 in) Oerlikon anti-aircraft (AA) cannons and/or, 2–8 × 37-millimeter (1.46 in) M1 AA guns

General characteristics (US Navy refit)
- Class & type: Guardian-class radar picket ship
- Capacity: 443,646 US gallons (1,679,383 L; 369,413 imp gal) (fuel oil); 68,267 US gallons (258,419 L; 56,844 imp gal) (diesel); 15,082 US gallons (57,092 L; 12,558 imp gal) (fresh water); 1,326,657 US gallons (5,021,943 L; 1,104,673 imp gal) (fresh water ballast)
- Complement: 13 officers; 138 enlisted
- Armament: 2 × 3 inches (76 mm)/50 caliber guns

USS Guardian (AGR/YAGR-1) was a Guardian-class radar picket ship, converted from a Liberty Ship, acquired by the US Navy in 1954. Her task was to act as part of the radar defenses of the United States in the Cold War, serving until 1965.

== Construction ==
Guardian (YAGR-1) was laid down on 20 March 1945, under a United States Maritime Commission (MARCOM) contract, MC hull 3137, as the Liberty Ship James G. Squires, by J.A. Jones Construction, Panama City, Florida. She was launched 8 May 1945; sponsored by Mrs. Elisa Broome; and delivered 31 May, to Waterman Steamship Corporation.

== Service history ==
She served until 5 October 1945, when she was placed in the National Defense Reserve Fleet, James River, Virginia.

Acquired by the US Navy, she was taken out of reserve in 1954, she was converted to a radar picket ship at the Charleston Navy Yard, Charleston, South Carolina, and commissioned Guardian (YAGR-1), at Norfolk, Virginia, 1 February 1955.

The first ocean radar station ship put into service by the Navy, Guardian conducted shakedown in Roosevelt Roads, Puerto Rico, and surrounding waters, reporting to Newport, Rhode Island, her home port, 2 June 1955. In 1958 the Atlantic Ocean radar picket force relocated to Davisville, Rhode Island.

Equipped with highly sensitive radar gear to enable her to detect, track, and report any aircraft penetrating the continental United States, Guardian was attached to the Eastern Continental Air Defense Command. She and her sister ships spent 3 or 4 weeks at a time off the US East Coast and West Coast on radar picket duty, even in the heaviest winter weather in the North Atlantic Ocean.

In addition to radar picket duty, Guardian participated in ASW exercises with both American and Canadian naval units and in local operations out of Newport and Key West, Florida. Her designation was changed to AGR-1 on 28 September 1958.

== Decommissioning ==
Guardian was decommissioned 28 July 1965. She was returned to the United States Maritime Commission (MARCOM) for lay up in the National Defense Reserve Fleet. She was sold for scrapping, 23 November 1970, and withdrawn from fleet, 21 December 1970. She was scrapped in Bilbao, Spain, September 1971.

== Military awards and honors ==
Guardian's crew was eligible for the following medals:

- Navy Expeditionary Medal (2 awards)
- National Defense Service Medal

== Bibliography ==
- "Guardian". Dictionary of American Naval Fighting Ships. Navy Department, Naval History and Heritage Command. This article incorporates text from this source, which is in the public domain.
- "Jones Construction, Panama City FL". ShipbuildingHistory.com. 13 October 2010.
- Davies, James (May 2004). "Specifications (As-Built)" (PDF). p. 23.
- "SS James G. Squires".
- "USS Guardian (AGR-1)". NavSource. 30 October 2015.
