= USS Picket (YAGR-7) =

Guardian-class radar picket ship

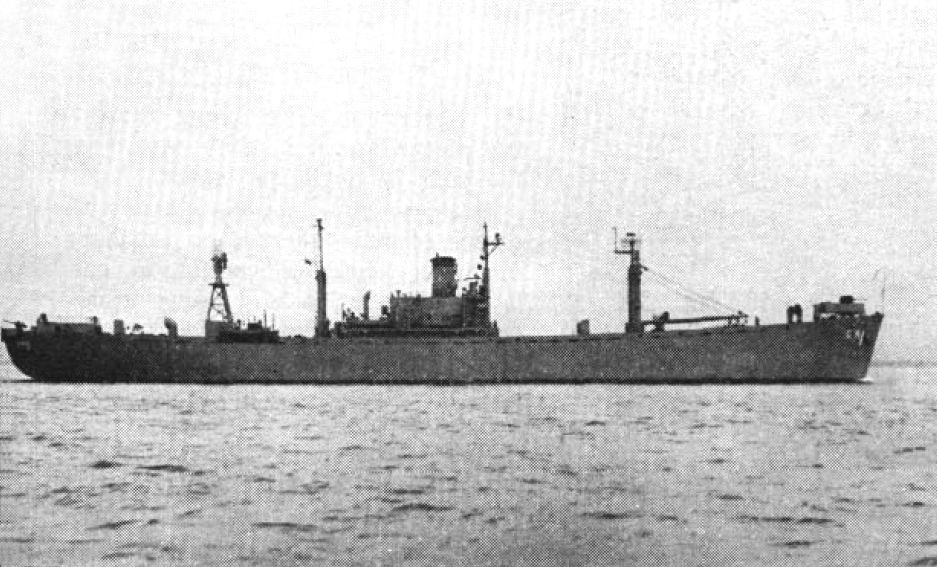
- USS Picket (AGR-7), in 1956

History

United States
- Name: James F. Harrell
- Namesake: James F. Harrell
- Owner: War Shipping Administration (WSA)
- Operator: Alcoa Steamship Co.Inc.
- Ordered: as type (EC2-S-C5) hull, MC hull 3138
- Builder: J.A. Jones Construction, Panama City, Florida
- Cost: $823,358
- Yard number: 98
- Way number: 3
- Laid down: 28 March 1945
- Launched: 17 May 1945
- Sponsored by: Mrs. Alice Harrell
- Completed: 11 June 1945
- Identification: Call sign: ANZH
- Fate: Placed in the, National Defense Reserve Fleet, James River Reserve Fleet, Lee Hall, Virginia, 6 October 1945; Acquired by US Navy, 12 July 1955

United States
- Name: Picket
- Namesake: A sentinel
- Commissioned: 8 February 1956
- Decommissioned: 30 July 1965
- Reclassified: Guardian-class radar picket ship
- Refit: Norfolk Naval Shipyard, Portsmouth, Virginia
- Stricken: 1 September 1965
- Identification: Hull symbol: YAGR-7 (1956–1958); Hull symbol: AGR-7 (1958–1965)
- Fate: Placed in National Defense Reserve Fleet, Suisun Bay Reserve Fleet, Suisun Bay, California, 1 September 1965; Sold for scrapping, 1978

General characteristics
- Class & type: Liberty ship; type EC2-S-C5, boxed aircraft transport
- Tonnage: 10,600 LT DWT; 7,200 GRT
- Displacement: 3,380 long tons (3,434 t) (light); 14,245 long tons (14,474 t) (max)
- Length: 441 feet 6 inches (135 m) oa; 416 feet (127 m) pp; 427 feet (130 m) lwl
- Beam: 57 feet (17 m)
- Draft: 27 ft 9.25 in (8.4646 m)
- Installed power: 2 × Oil fired 450 °F (232 °C) boilers, operating at 220 psi (1,500 kPa); 2,500 hp (1,900 kW)
- Propulsion: 1 × triple-expansion steam engine, (manufactured by Joshua Hendy Iron Works, Sunnyvale, California); 1 × screw propeller
- Speed: 11.5 knots (21.3 km/h; 13.2 mph)
- Capacity: 490,000 cubic feet (13,875 m^{3}) (bale)
- Complement: 38–62 USMM; 21–40 USNAG
- Armament: Varied by ship; Bow-mounted 3-inch (76 mm)/50-caliber gun; Stern-mounted 4-inch (102 mm)/50-caliber gun; 2–8 × single 20-millimeter (0.79 in) Oerlikon anti-aircraft (AA) cannons and/or, 2–8 × 37-millimeter (1.46 in) M1 AA guns

General characteristics (US Navy refit)
- Class & type: Guardian-class radar picket ship
- Capacity: 443,646 US gallons (1,679,383 L; 369,413 imp gal) (fuel oil); 68,267 US gallons (258,419 L; 56,844 imp gal) (diesel); 15,082 US gallons (57,092 L; 12,558 imp gal) (fresh water); 1,326,657 US gallons (5,021,943 L; 1,104,673 imp gal) (fresh water ballast)
- Complement: 13 officers; 138 enlisted
- Armament: 2 × 3 inches (76 mm)/50 caliber guns

USS Picket (YAGR/AGR-7) was a Guardian-class radar picket ship, converted from a Liberty Ship, acquired by the US Navy in 1955. She was obtained from the National Defense Reserve Fleet and reconfigured as a radar picket ship and assigned to radar picket duty in the North Pacific Ocean as part of the Distant Early Warning Line.

== Construction ==
Picket (YAGR-7) was laid down 28 March 1945, under a Maritime Commission (MARCOM) contract, MC hull 3138, as the Liberty Ship James F. Harrell, by J.A. Jones Construction, Panama City, Florida. She was launched 17 May 1945, sponsored by Mrs. Alice Harrell, and delivered to Alcoa Steamship Lines for merchant marine service 11 June 1945.

== Service history ==
=== Merchant service ===
As a merchant ship, James F. Harrell served Alcoa Steamship Lines from June to October 1945. Following assignment to the National Defense Reserve Fleet, James River, Virginia, 6 October 1945 to 31 January 1947, she served United States Navigation Company, Baltimore, Maryland, January 1947 to August 1948. Her next merchant duty was for Boland and Cornelius Company, New York, August 1948. James F. Harrell remained in the National Defense Reserve Fleet, Wilmington, North Carolina, from 29 August 1948 to 11 July 1955.

=== US Navy service ===
Acquired by the US Navy on 12 July 1955, and renamed Picket, the merchant ship was towed to the Norfolk Navy Yard, Portsmouth, Virginia, for conversion to station ship YAGR-7. She was commissioned on 8 February 1956. She was reclassified AGR-7 on 28 September 1958.

From 1956 to 1965, Picket used her long range radar and communications equipment to serve the North American Air Defense Command. She provided vital radar information on seaward air approaches to the Pacific coast. She spent more than half of 1964 at sea, on various stations 500 to 600 mi (800 to 970 km) off the west coast of the United States and Canada. Her sea tours usually included 30 to 35 days at sea, followed by 15 to 30 days in San Francisco, California, between patrols.

== Decommissioning ==
Struck from the Naval Vessel Register on 1 September 1965, Picket joined the Maritime Administration Reserve Fleet, Suisun Bay, San Francisco, California, until sold for scrapping in 1978.

== Military awards and honors ==
Scanner's crew was eligible for the following medals:

- National Defense Service Medal

== Bibliography ==
- "Picket II (YAGR-7)". Dictionary of American Naval Fighting Ships. Navy Department, Naval History and Heritage Command. 20 August 2015. This article incorporates text from this source, which is in the public domain.
- "Jones Construction, Panama City FL". www.ShipbuildingHistory.com. 13 October 2010.
- Davies, James (May 2004). "Specifications (As-Built)" (PDF). p. 23.
- "SS James F. Harrell".
- "USS Picket (AGR-7)". NavSource. 29 January 2016.
