= USS Scanner =

Guardian-class radar picket ship

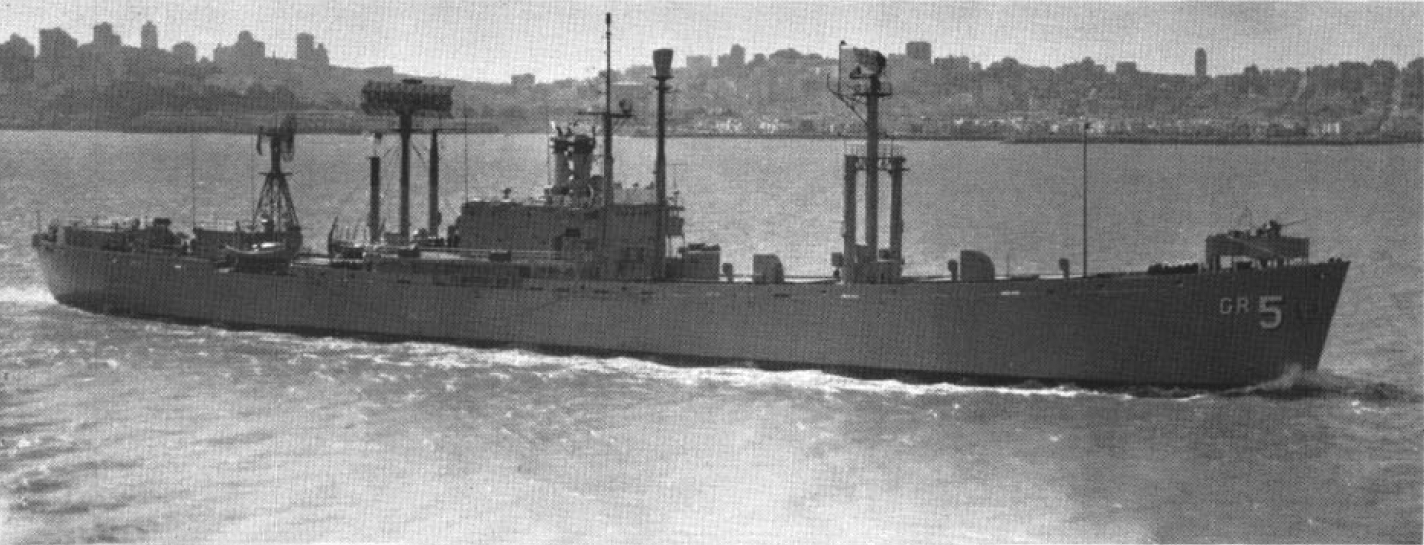
- The U.S. Navy radar picket ship USS Scanner (AGR-5), c. 1965. Scanner was decommissioned on 21 July 1965.

History

United States
- Name: Edwin D. Howard
- Namesake: Edwin D. Howard
- Owner: War Shipping Administration (WSA)
- Operator: Alcoa Steamship Co. Inc.
- Ordered: as type (EC2-S-C5) hull, MC hull 2344
- Builder: J.A. Jones Construction, Panama City, Florida
- Cost: $1,004,408
- Yard number: 85
- Way number: 1
- Laid down: 24 January 1945
- Launched: 27 February 1945
- Sponsored by: Mrs. J. E. Davidson
- Completed: 14 March 1945
- Identification: Call sign: ANQC
- Fate: Placed in the, National Defense Reserve Fleet, 21 November 1947; Acquired by US Navy, 10 June 1955

United States
- Name: Scanner
- Namesake: One who examines and searches an area by regular sweeps
- Commissioned: 30 January 1956
- Decommissioned: 21 July 1965
- Reclassified: Guardian-class radar picket ship
- Refit: Norfolk Naval Shipyard, Norfolk, Virginia
- Stricken: 1 September 1965
- Identification: Hull symbol: YAGR-5 (1956–1958); Hull symbol: AGR-5 (1958–1965); Call sign: NOLH
- Fate: Placed in National Defense Reserve Fleet, Suisun Bay Reserve Fleet, Suisun Bay, California, 4 February 1966; Sold for non-transportation use, 3 October 1974

General characteristics
- Class & type: Liberty ship; type EC2-S-C5, boxed aircraft transport
- Tonnage: 10,600 LT DWT; 7,200 GRT
- Displacement: 3,380 long tons (3,434 t) (light); 14,245 long tons (14,474 t) (max)
- Length: 441 feet 6 inches (135 m) oa; 416 feet (127 m) pp; 427 feet (130 m) lwl
- Beam: 57 feet (17 m)
- Draft: 27 ft 9.25 in (8.4646 m)
- Installed power: 2 × Oil fired 450 °F (232 °C) boilers, operating at 220 psi (1,500 kPa); 2,500 hp (1,900 kW)
- Propulsion: 1 × triple-expansion steam engine, (manufactured by General Machinery Corp., Hamilton, Ohio); 1 × screw propeller
- Speed: 11.5 knots (21.3 km/h; 13.2 mph)
- Capacity: 490,000 cubic feet (13,875 m^{3}) (bale)
- Complement: 38–62 USMM; 21–40 USNAG
- Armament: Varied by ship; Bow-mounted 3-inch (76 mm)/50-caliber gun; Stern-mounted 4-inch (102 mm)/50-caliber gun; 2–8 × single 20-millimeter (0.79 in) Oerlikon anti-aircraft (AA) cannons and/or, 2–8 × 37-millimeter (1.46 in) M1 AA guns

General characteristics (US Navy refit)
- Class & type: Guardian-class radar picket ship
- Capacity: 443,646 US gallons (1,679,383 L; 369,413 imp gal) (fuel oil); 68,267 US gallons (258,419 L; 56,844 imp gal) (diesel); 15,082 US gallons (57,092 L; 12,558 imp gal) (fresh water); 1,326,657 US gallons (5,021,943 L; 1,104,673 imp gal) (fresh water ballast)
- Complement: 13 officers; 138 enlisted
- Armament: 2 × 3 inches (76 mm)/50 caliber guns

USS Scanner (AGR/YAGR-5) was a Guardian-class radar picket ship, converted from a liberty ship, acquired by the United States Navy in 1955. She was obtained from the National Defense Reserve Fleet and reconfigured as a radar picket ship and assigned to radar picket duty in the North Pacific Ocean as part of the Distant Early Warning Line.

== Construction ==
Scanner (YAGR-5) was laid down on 24 January 1945, under a Maritime Commission (MARCOM) contract, MC hull 2344, as the liberty ship Edwin D. Howard, by J.A. Jones Construction, Panama City, Florida. She was launched on 27 February 1945, sponsored by Mrs. John E. Davidson, and delivered on 14 March 1945, to the Alcoa Steamship Company.

== Service history ==
She was acquired by the Navy from the US Maritime Administration (MARAD) on 10 June 1955. She was converted to a radar picket ship at the Norfolk Naval Shipyard, and commissioned Scanner on 30 January 1956.

Scanner departed Norfolk, on 28 March 1956, for her home port, San Francisco, California, and commenced her first patrol in the Pacific Ocean in July 1956, with the seaward extension of America's early warning defense system.

Fitted with sophisticated electronic search and tracking equipment, Scanner could detect, track, and report enemy aircraft at great distances, and control high speed interceptor aircraft in event of attack. She also carried out weather reporting duties during her three to four-week-long cruises.

== Decommissioning ==
Scanner was redesignated AGR-5 effective 28 September 1958. She was decommissioned on 21 July 1965, at San Francisco, and turned over to Maritime Administration (MARAD) custody on 26 July, at Suisun Bay, California. Struck from the Navy List on 1 September 1965, she was transferred permanently to the MARAD on 4 February 1966, and remained in the Suisun Bay reserve fleet until 3 October 1974, when she was sold for non-transport use.

== Military awards and honors ==
Scanner's crew was eligible for the following medals:

- National Defense Service Medal

== See also ==
- United States Navy
- Radar picket

== Bibliography ==
- "Scanner". Dictionary of American Naval Fighting Ships. Navy Department, Naval History and Heritage Command. This article incorporates text from this source, which is in the public domain.
- "Jones Construction, Panama City FL". www.ShipbuildingHistory.com. 13 October 2010.
- Davies, James (May 2004). "Specifications (As-Built)" (PDF). p. 23.
- "SS Edwin D. Howard".
- "USS Scanner (AGR-5)". NavSource. 8 December 2017.
