= USS Skywatcher =

Guardian-class radar picket ship

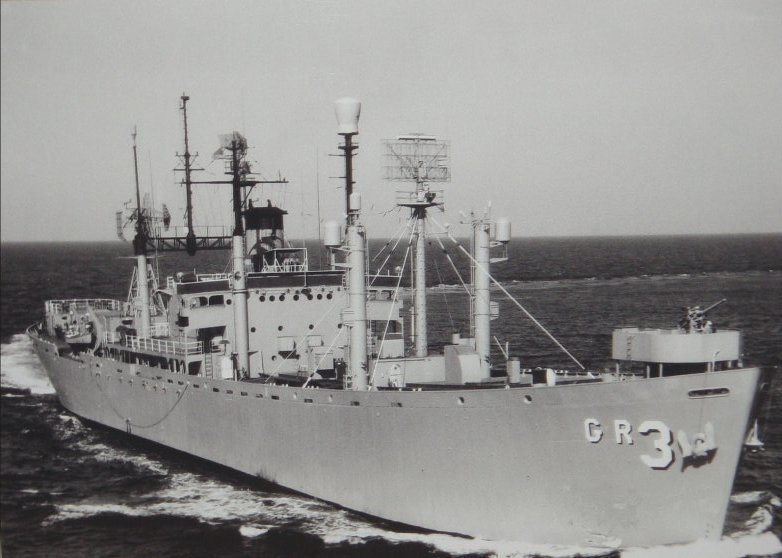
- USS Skywatcher (AGR-3) underway, date and location unknown.

History

United States
- Name: Rafeal R. Rivera
- Namesake: Rafeal R. Rivera
- Owner: War Shipping Administration (WSA)
- Operator: States Marine Corp.
- Ordered: as type (EC2-S-C5) hull, MC hull 2337
- Builder: J.A. Jones Construction, Panama City, Florida
- Cost: $1,169,703
- Yard number: 78
- Way number: 6
- Laid down: 30 November 1944
- Launched: 16 January 1945
- Sponsored by: Mrs.Evelyn Anderson
- Completed: 30 January 1945
- Identification: Call sign: ANFC
- Fate: Placed in the, National Defense Reserve Fleet, 26 October 1947; Acquired by US Navy, 20 September 1954

United States
- Name: Skywatcher
- Commissioned: 29 March 1955
- Decommissioned: 29 March 1965
- Reclassified: Guardian-class radar picket ship
- Refit: Charleston Naval Shipyard, Charleston, South Carolina
- Stricken: 1 April 1965
- Identification: Hull symbol: YAGR-3 (1956–1958); Hull symbol: AGR-3 (1958–1965)
- Fate: Sold for scrapping, 23 December 1970, scrapped, December 1971

General characteristics
- Class & type: Liberty ship; type EC2-S-C5, boxed aircraft transport
- Tonnage: 10,600 LT DWT; 7,200 GRT
- Displacement: 3,380 long tons (3,434 t) (light); 14,245 long tons (14,474 t) (max)
- Length: 441 feet 6 inches (135 m) oa; 416 feet (127 m) pp; 427 feet (130 m) lwl
- Beam: 57 feet (17 m)
- Draft: 27 ft 9.25 in (8.4646 m)
- Installed power: 2 × Oil fired 450 °F (232 °C) boilers, operating at 220 psi (1,500 kPa); 2,500 hp (1,900 kW)
- Propulsion: 1 × triple-expansion steam engine, (manufactured by Joshua Hendy Iron Works, Sunnyvale, California); 1 × screw propeller
- Speed: 11.5 knots (21.3 km/h; 13.2 mph)
- Capacity: 490,000 cubic feet (13,875 m^{3}) (bale)
- Complement: 38–62 USMM; 21–40 USNAG
- Armament: Varied by ship; Bow-mounted 3-inch (76 mm)/50-caliber gun; Stern-mounted 4-inch (102 mm)/50-caliber gun; 2–8 × single 20-millimeter (0.79 in) Oerlikon anti-aircraft (AA) cannons and/or, 2–8 × 37-millimeter (1.46 in) M1 AA guns

General characteristics (US Navy refit)
- Class & type: Guardian-class radar picket ship
- Capacity: 443,646 US gallons (1,679,383 L; 369,413 imp gal) (fuel oil); 68,267 US gallons (258,419 L; 56,844 imp gal) (diesel); 15,082 US gallons (57,092 L; 12,558 imp gal) (fresh water); 1,326,657 US gallons (5,021,943 L; 1,104,673 imp gal) (fresh water ballast)
- Complement: 13 officers; 138 enlisted
- Armament: 2 × 3 inches (76 mm)/50 caliber guns

USS Skywatcher (YAGR/AGR-3) was a Guardian-class radar picket ship, converted from a Liberty Ship, acquired by the US Navy in 1954. She was converted into a radar picket ship and assigned to radar picket duty in the North Atlantic Ocean as part of the Distant Early Warning Line.

== Construction ==
Skywatcher (YAGR-3) was laid down on 30 November 1944, under a Maritime Commission (MARCOM) contract, MC hull 2337, as the Liberty Ship Rafael R. Rivera, by J.A. Jones Construction, Panama City, Florida. She was launched on 16 January 1945; sponsored by Mrs. Evelyn Anderson; and delivered 25 June 1945, to the States Marine Corporation.

== Service history ==
=== Seacowboys ===
In 1946, after World War II, Rafael R. Rivera was converted to a livestock ship, also called a cowboy ship. From 1945 to 1947, the United Nations Relief and Rehabilitation Administration and the Brethren Service Committee of the Church of the Brethren sent livestock to war-torn countries. These "seagoing cowboys" made about 360 trips on 73 different ships. The Heifers for Relief project was started by the Church of the Brethren in 1942; in 1953, this became Heifer International. Rafael R Rivera was one of these ships, known as cowboy ships, as she moved livestock across the Atlantic Ocean. Rafael R Rivera moved horses, heifers, and mules, as well as some chicks, rabbits, and goats.

=== U.S. Navy service ===
She was acquired by the U.S. Navy on 20 September 1954, and converted at the Portsmouth Naval Shipyard, Norfolk, Virginia, into an ocean station radar ship. She was commissioned on 29 March 1955.

In July 1955, she assumed her first duties in the Contiguous Radar Coverage System of the United States while operating out of Newport, Rhode Island.

In September 1958, the ship's designation was changed from YAGR-3 to radar picket ship AGR-3. Her home port was changed to Davisville, Rhode Island, and she operated from there until early 1965, with Radar Picket Squadron 2, spending over 50 percent of her time on her assigned picket station.

== Decommissioning ==
In March 1965, Skywatcher was placed in reserve, out of commission, and struck from the Navy List on 1 April 1965. She was sold on 23 December 1970, to Daewood Corp., Ltd., of Karachi, Pakistan. She was resold again for scrapping and in December 1971, she arrived at Santander, Spain, to be scrapped.

== See also ==
- United States Navy
- Radar picket

== Bibliography ==
- "Skywatcher". Dictionary of American Naval Fighting Ships. Navy Department, Naval History and Heritage Command. 30 August 2016. This article incorporates text from this source, which is in the public domain.
- "Jones Construction, Panama City FL". www.ShipbuildingHistory.com. 13 October 2010.
- Davies, James (May 2004). "Specifications (As-Built)" (PDF). p. 23. Archived (PDF) from the original on 5 May 2017.
- "SS Rafael R. Rivera". Archived from the original on 9 October 2025.
- "USS Skywatcher (AGR-3)". NavSource. 11 April 2019. Archived from the original on 9 October 2025.
