= USS Interdictor =

US naval vessel (1954–1965)

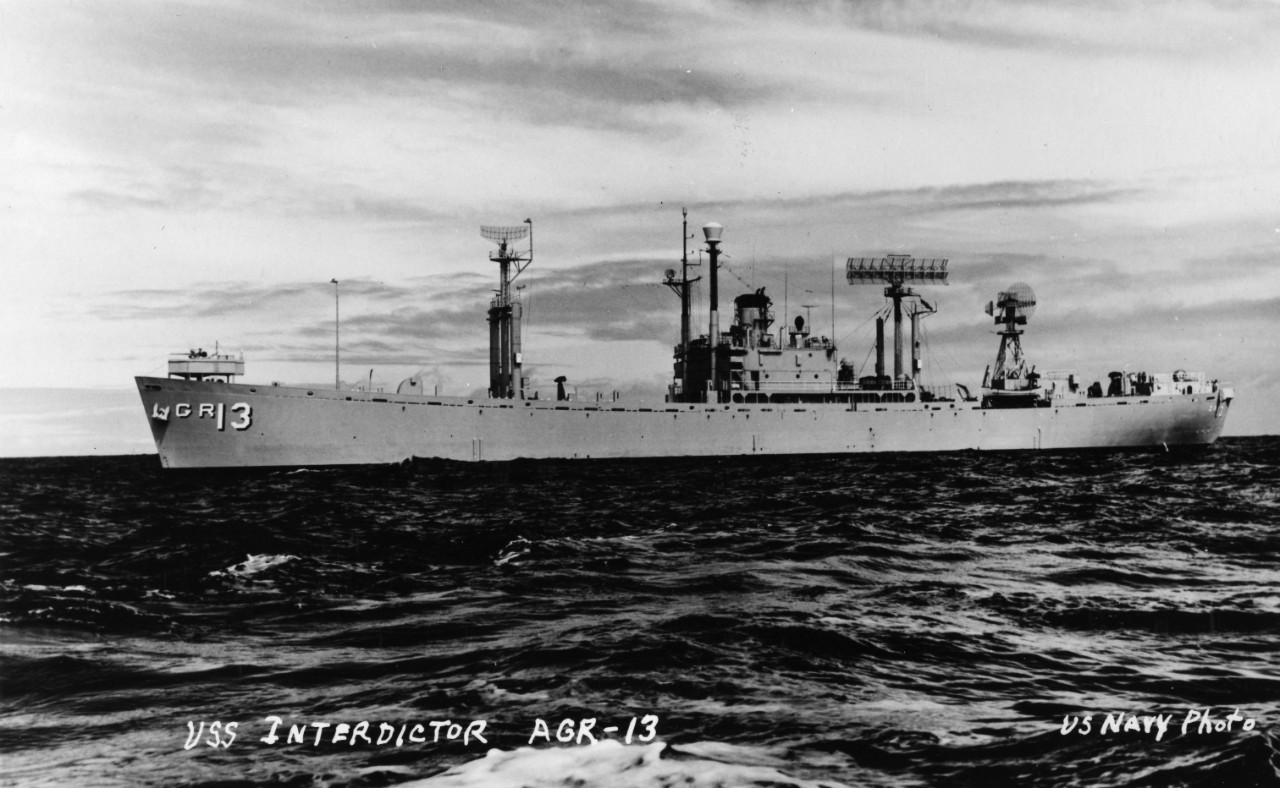

History

United States
- Name: Edwin H. Duff
- Namesake: Edwin H. Duff
- Owner: War Shipping Administration (WSA)
- Operator: McCormack Steamship Co.
- Ordered: as type (EC2-S-C5) hull, MC hull 3142
- Builder: J.A. Jones Construction, Panama City, Florida
- Cost: $817,101
- Yard number: 102
- Way number: 3
- Laid down: 18 May 1945
- Launched: 29 June 1945
- Sponsored by: Mrs. Edwin H. Duff
- Completed: 27 July 1945
- Identification: Call sign: AOEM
- Fate: Placed in the, National Defense Reserve Fleet, James River Reserve Fleet, Lee Hall, Virginia, 17 October 1945; Acquired by US Navy, 10 May 1957

United States
- Name: Interdictor
- Namesake: One who prohibits
- Commissioned: 7 April 1958
- Decommissioned: 5 August 1965
- Reclassified: Guardian-class radar picket ship
- Refit: Charleston Naval Shipyard, Charleston, South Carolina
- Stricken: 1 September 1965
- Identification: Hull symbol: YAGR-13 (1957–1958); Hull symbol: AGR-13 (1958–1965); Call sign: NVVB
- Fate: Placed in National Defense Reserve Fleet, Suisun Bay Reserve Fleet, Suisun Bay, California, 1 September 1965; Sold for non-transportation use, 13 June 1974

General characteristics
- Class & type: Liberty ship; type EC2-S-C5, boxed aircraft transport
- Tonnage: 10,600 LT DWT; 7,200 GRT
- Displacement: 3,380 long tons (3,434 t) (light); 14,245 long tons (14,474 t) (max)
- Length: 441 feet 6 inches (135 m) oa; 416 feet (127 m) pp; 427 feet (130 m) lwl
- Beam: 57 feet (17 m)
- Draft: 27 ft 9.25 in (8.4646 m)
- Installed power: 2 × Oil fired 450 °F (232 °C) boilers, operating at 220 psi (1,500 kPa); 2,500 hp (1,900 kW)
- Propulsion: 1 × triple-expansion steam engine, (manufactured by Filer and Stowell, Milwaukee, Wisconsin); 1 × screw propeller
- Speed: 11.5 knots (21.3 km/h; 13.2 mph)
- Capacity: 490,000 cubic feet (13,875 m^{3}) (bale)
- Complement: 38–62 USMM; 21–40 USNAG
- Armament: Varied by ship; Bow-mounted 3-inch (76 mm)/50-caliber gun; Stern-mounted 4-inch (102 mm)/50-caliber gun; 2–8 × single 20-millimeter (0.79 in) Oerlikon anti-aircraft (AA) cannons and/or, 2–8 × 37-millimeter (1.46 in) M1 AA guns

General characteristics (US Navy refit)
- Class & type: Guardian-class radar picket ship
- Capacity: 443,646 US gallons (1,679,383 L; 369,413 imp gal) (fuel oil); 68,267 US gallons (258,419 L; 56,844 imp gal) (diesel); 15,082 US gallons (57,092 L; 12,558 imp gal) (fresh water); 1,326,657 US gallons (5,021,943 L; 1,104,673 imp gal) (fresh water ballast)
- Complement: 13 officers; 138 enlisted
- Armament: 2 × 3 inches (76 mm)/50 caliber guns

USS Interdictor (AGR/YAGR-13) was a Guardian-class radar picket ship, converted from a Liberty ship, acquired by the US Navy in 1954. She was reconfigured as a radar picket ship and assigned to radar picket duty in the North Pacific Ocean as part of the Distant Early Warning Line.

== Construction ==
Interdictor (YAGR-13) was laid down on 18 May 1945, under a Maritime Commission (MARCOM) contract, MC hull 3142, as the Liberty ship Edwin H. Duff, by J.A. Jones Construction, Panama City, Florida. She was launched 29 June 1945; sponsored by Mrs. Edwin S. Duff; and delivered 27 July 1945, to the McCormack Steamship Co.

== Service history ==
She carried aircraft until entering the James River Reserve Fleet, Lee Hall, Virginia, 17 October 1945. Except for brief cargo service, she remained there until being acquired by the US Navy, 10 May 1957.

She was converted to a radar picket ship at the Charleston Navy Yard, Charleston, South Carolina, and commissioned Interdictor (YAGR-13), 7 April 1958.

Interdictor was fitted with the latest and best electronic search and tracking equipment available at the time. She sailed 2 May 1958 for shakedown training in the Caribbean, and departed Charleston, 18 July 1958 for her new home port, San Francisco, California.

Arriving 13 August, the ship assumed her role as an ocean radar station ship, part of America's vast early warning defense system. Operating with search aircraft, Interdictor could detect, track, and report enemy aircraft at great distances, supplementing land-based radar stations, and controlling high-speed interceptor aircraft in case of attack. She also carried out weather reporting duties during her three to four week cruises in the Pacific Ocean.

Interdictor's hull classification was changed 28 September 1958, to AGR-13. She continued on radar picket patrols for the Continental Air Defense Command (CONAD) out of San Francisco, until decommissioned 5 August 1965.

== Decommissioning ==
Her name was struck from the Navy Directory 1 September 1965, when she transferred to the US Maritime Administration (MARAD) for lay-up in the Suisun Bay Reserve Fleet, Suisun Bay, California, where she remained until she was sold 13 June 1974. Her subsequent fate is not known.

== Honors and awards ==
Interdictor's crew was eligible for the following medals:

- National Defense Service Medal

== See also ==
- United States Navy
- Radar picket

== Bibliography ==
- "Interdictor". Dictionary of American Naval Fighting Ships. Navy Department, Naval History and Heritage Command. 22 July 2015. This article incorporates text from this source, which is in the public domain.
- "Jones Construction, Panama City FL". ShipbuildingHistory.com. 13 October 2010.
- Davies, James (May 2004). "Specifications (As-Built)" (PDF). p. 23.
- "SS Edwin H. Duff".
- "USS Interdictor (AGR-13)". NavSource. 9 October 2015.
