= USS Interpreter =

Guardian-class radar picket ship

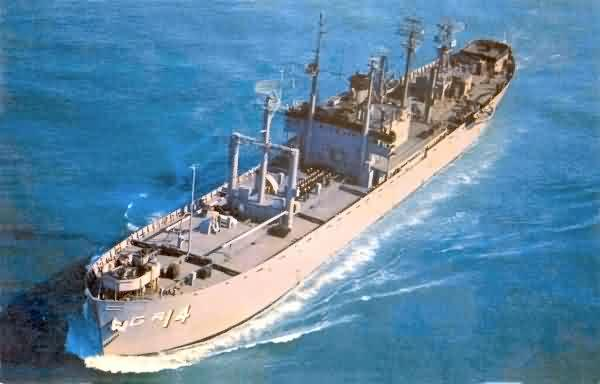
- USS Interpreter (AGR-14), underway, date and location unknown.

History

United States
- Name: Dudley H.Thomas
- Namesake: Dudley H. Thomas
- Owner: War Shipping Administration (WSA)
- Operator: Merchants & Miners Transportation Company
- Ordered: as type (EC2-S-C5) hull, MC hull 2341
- Builder: J.A. Jones Construction, Panama City, Florida
- Cost: $1,036,875
- Yard number: 82
- Way number: 3
- Laid down: 5 January 1945
- Launched: 8 February 1945
- Sponsored by: Miss Carriek Cobitt
- Completed: 21 February 1945
- Identification: Call sign: ANIK
- Fate: Placed in the, National Defense Reserve Fleet, 1947; Acquired by US Navy, 5 June 1957

United States
- Name: Interpreter
- Namesake: One who explains, translates, or tells the meaning of
- Commissioned: 29 September 1958
- Decommissioned: 1 July 1965
- Reclassified: Guardian-class radar picket ship
- Refit: Philadelphia Naval Shipyard, Philadelphia, Pennsylvania
- Stricken: 1 July 1965
- Identification: Hull symbol: AGR-14; Call sign: NBRU
- Fate: Placed in National Defense Reserve Fleet, Suisun Bay Reserve Fleet, Suisun Bay, California, 1 July 1965; Sold for scrapping, 4 November 1974

General characteristics
- Class & type: Liberty ship; type EC2-S-C5, boxed aircraft transport
- Tonnage: 10,600 LT DWT; 7,200 GRT
- Displacement: 3,380 long tons (3,434 t) (light); 14,245 long tons (14,474 t) (max)
- Length: 441 feet 6 inches (135 m) oa; 416 feet (127 m) pp; 427 feet (130 m) lwl
- Beam: 57 feet (17 m)
- Draft: 27 ft 9.25 in (8.4646 m)
- Installed power: 2 × Oil fired 450 °F (232 °C) boilers, operating at 220 psi (1,500 kPa); 2,500 hp (1,900 kW)
- Propulsion: 1 × triple-expansion steam engine, (manufactured by Filer and Stowell, Milwaukee, Wisconsin); 1 × screw propeller
- Speed: 11.5 knots (21.3 km/h; 13.2 mph)
- Capacity: 490,000 cubic feet (13,875 m^{3}) (bale)
- Complement: 38–62 USMM; 21–40 USNAG
- Armament: Varied by ship; Bow-mounted 3-inch (76 mm)/50-caliber gun; Stern-mounted 4-inch (102 mm)/50-caliber gun; 2–8 × single 20-millimeter (0.79 in) Oerlikon anti-aircraft (AA) cannons and/or, 2–8 × 37-millimeter (1.46 in) M1 AA guns

General characteristics (US Navy refit)
- Class & type: Guardian-class radar picket ship
- Capacity: 443,646 US gallons (1,679,383 L; 369,413 imp gal) (fuel oil); 68,267 US gallons (258,419 L; 56,844 imp gal) (diesel); 15,082 US gallons (57,092 L; 12,558 imp gal) (fresh water); 1,326,657 US gallons (5,021,943 L; 1,104,673 imp gal) (fresh water ballast)
- Complement: 13 officers; 138 enlisted
- Armament: 2 × 3 inches (76 mm)/50 caliber guns

USS Interpreter (AGR-14) was a Guardian-class radar picket ship, converted from a Liberty Ship, acquired by the US Navy in 1957. She was reconfigured as a radar picket ship and assigned to radar picket duty in the North Pacific Ocean as part of the Distant Early Warning Line.

== Construction ==
Interpreter (AGR-14) was laid down on 5 January 1945, under a Maritime Commission (MARCOM) contract, MC hull 2341, as the Liberty Ship Dudley H. Thomas, by J.A. Jones Construction, Panama City, Florida. She was launched 8 February 1945; sponsored by Miss Carrie Corbitt; and delivered 21 February 1945, to the Merchants and Miners Transportation Co., Boston, Massachusetts.

== Service history ==
=== Seacowboys ===
The ship served as an aircraft freighter during the war and later as a cargo ship for various companies.

In 1946, after World War II, Dudley H. Thomas was converted to a livestock ship, also called a cowboy ship. From 1945 to 1947, the United Nations Relief and Rehabilitation Administration and the Brethren Service Committee of the Church of the Brethren sent livestock to war-torn countries. These "seagoing cowboys" made about 360 trips on 73 different ships. The Heifers for Relief project was started by the Church of the Brethren in 1942; in 1953, this became Heifer International. Dudley H. Thomas was one of these ships, known as cowboy ships, as she moved livestock across the Atlantic Ocean. Dudley H. Thomas moved 780 horses, several thousand baby chicks and hay bales to Poland, on each leg of her trip. Dudley H. Thomas moved horses, heifers, and mules, as well as some chicks, rabbits, and goats.

In 1947, with her war and relief work done, she was laid up in the National Defense Reserve Fleet.

=== Korean War ===
In 1950, a new war was starting in the Far East, so she was removed from the Reserve Fleet in 1951.

Dudley H. Thomas served as merchant marine ship supplying goods for the Korean War. About 75 percent of the personnel taken to Korea for the Korean War came by the merchant marine ship. Dudley H. Thomas transported goods, mail, food and other supplies. About 90 percent of the cargo was moved by merchant marine naval to the war zone. Dudley H. Thomas made trips between 1951 and 1953, helping American forces engaged against Communist aggression in South Korea.

On 25 August 1953, she was returned to the National Defense Reserve Fleet, until 5 June 1957, when she was acquired by the US Navy.

=== US Navy service ===
She was converted to a radar picket ship at the Philadelphia Naval Shipyard, Philadelphia, Pennsylvania, and commissioned Interpreter (AGR-14), 29 September 1958.

One of a class of sixteen radar picket ships, Interpreter conducted shakedown exercises in the Caribbean before departing Guantanamo Bay, Cuba, 1 February 1959, for her new home port, San Francisco, California.

Equipped with the most advanced long range radar and communications gear, Interpreter joined the Continental Air Defense Command (CONAD) as part of America's vital early warning system. Operating with search aircraft for periods of 3 to 4 weeks at sea, the ship reported and tracked aircraft at great distances and controlled interceptors in the event of enemy air attack.

Interpreter continued regular patrols in the Contiguous Radar Barrier, for 6 years, providing a vital link in the air defense of her country.

== Decommissioning ==
Struck 1 July 1965, Interpreter was transferred to the US Maritime Administration (MARAD) for lay-up in the Suisun Bay Reserve Fleet, Suisun Bay, California, where she remained until sold for scrapping, 4 November 1974.

== Honors and awards ==
Interpreter's crew was eligible for the following medals:

- National Defense Service Medal

== See also ==
- United States Navy
- Radar picket

== Bibliography ==
- "Interpreter". Dictionary of American Naval Fighting Ships. Navy Department, Naval History and Heritage Command. This article incorporates text from this source, which is in the public domain.
- "Jones Construction, Panama City FL". www.ShipbuildingHistory.com. 13 October 2010.
- Davies, James (May 2004). "Specifications (As-Built)" (PDF). p. 23.
- "SS Dudley H.Thomas".
- "USS Interpreter (AGR-14)". NavSource. 2 February 2018.
