= Guardian-class radar picket ship =

1945 class of American radar picket ships

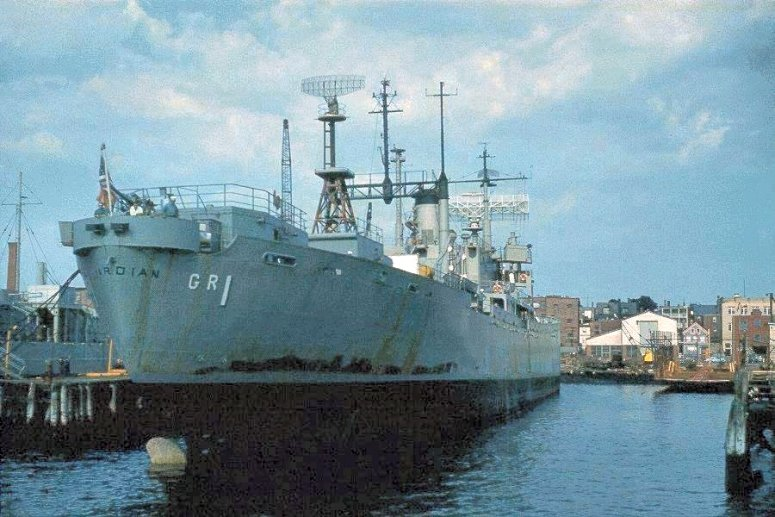
- USS Guardian, the lead ship of the class

Class overview
- Name: Guardian class
- Operators: United States Navy
- Built: 1943–1945
- In commission: 1954–1965
- Completed: 16
- Retired: 16

General characteristics
- Type: Radar picket ship, converted Liberty ship, type Z-EC2-S-C5
- Displacement: 10,760 long tons (10,930 t) full load
- Length: 441 ft 6 in (134.57 m)
- Beam: 56 ft 11 in (17.35 m)
- Draft: 24 ft (7.3 m)
- Propulsion: two 220 PSI boilers; one 3 cylinder triple-expansion steam engine; one 4-blade, 18 ft 6 in (5.64 m) propeller; 2,500 shp (1,900 kW)
- Speed: 11 kn (20 km/h; 13 mph)
- Complement: 13-20 officers, 138-150 enlisted
- Armament: 2 × 3 in (76 mm)/50 caliber guns

The Guardian-class radar picket ships were a class of ocean radar picket ships (YAGR, later AGR), converted 1954–1958 from World War II Liberty ships acquired by the U.S. Navy. Their task was to act as part of the radar defenses of the United States in the Cold War, serving until 1965.

== Ship type ==
The converted Liberty ships were typically the boxed aircraft transport version, type Z-EC2-S-C5. The hull classification symbol of the ships was initially YAGR, changed to AGR in 1958: originally the District Auxiliary, Miscellaneous (YAG) classification with hull numbers YAG-41 through YAG-44 for the first four ships was considered, but this symbol was not adopted.

== Equipment ==
As converted, each ship carried an AN/SPS-8 height finding radar, AN/SPS-12 air/surface search radar, AN/SPS-17 long range air search radar, and AN/UPA-22 IFF sensor. The AN/SPS-8 was later replaced on some ships by the AN/SPS-30. The AN/SPS-17, purpose-built for the Guardian class, could detect large aircraft such as bombers up to 220 nautical miles (410 km; 250 mi) away and small aircraft up to 102 nautical miles (189 km; 117 mi) away.

== Service ==
The AGRs were based on both coasts at Newport, Rhode Island (later Davisville, Rhode Island) and Treasure Island, California near San Francisco, eight on the East Coast and eight on the West Coast. They would spend 30–45 days at sea regardless of weather, alternating with 15 days in port, monitoring aircraft approaching the United States in the Contiguous Radar Coverage System, an adjunct to the Distant Early Warning line under the Continental Air Defense Command. Their primary duty was to warn of a surprise Soviet bomber attack. The AGRs were augmented by twelve radar picket destroyer escorts (DERs) of the Edsall and John C. Butler classes, Lockheed EC-121 / WV-2 Warning Star aircraft, and in the Atlantic, Goodyear ZPG-2W and ZPG-3W blimps and Texas Towers. The DERs and Navy WV-2s were called Barrier Forces, BarLant and BarPac, and operated much further from the US than the AGRs; the Air Force EC-121s operated in "Contiguous Barrier" orbits between the coasts and the AGRs. By 1965, the development of over-the-horizon radar had superseded their function, and the radar picket ships were decommissioned and scrapped by the early 1970s.

The Contiguous Radar Coverage System's picket stations were about 400–500 miles (640–800 km) off each coast and provided an overlapping radar or electronic barrier against approaching aircraft. While on station, the ships' operational control shifted from the Navy to the Air Force and NORAD. While on station, each ship stayed within a specific radius of its assigned picket station, reporting and tracking all aircraft contacts. Each ship carried qualified air controllers to direct intercept aircraft sent out to engage contacts. While on station other duties such as search and rescue, weather reporting, and miscellaneous duties were assigned. The National Marine Fisheries Service even provided fishing gear so that the crew could fish for tuna during the season, and the ships sent daily reports of fish caught for research purposes.

The Guardian class spent more time at sea than any other U.S. Navy vessels, apart from ballistic missile submarines, averaging 220–250 days per year on patrol. To make this very high amount of sea time as comfortable as possible for the crew, all sleeping quarters were air conditioned, each officer had a private stateroom, petty officers shared two-man cabins and enlisted men slept in four-man cabins (most other USN enlisted men at the time slept in hammocks, and in large berthing compartments regardless of type of bed).

== Ships in class ==
List of Guardian-class radar picket ships
Hull no.	Ship	Fleet	Original Name	Converted by	Commissioned	Decommission	Fate
AGR-1	Guardian	Atlantic Squadron	SS James G Squires (MCE hull 3137)	CNY	1 February 1955	28 July 1965	Sold for scrapping (PD-X-888) dated 23 November 1970, to Revalarizacion de Materiales, S. A. c/o Boston Metals Co. contract MA-6163, withdrawn from the Reserve Fleet, 21 December 1970. scrapped in September 1971 at Bilbao, Spain
AGR-2	Lookout	Atlantic Squadron	SS Claude B Kitchen (MCE hull 3139)	CNY	5 March 1955	12 July 1965	Scrapped in November 1970 at Bilbao, Spain
AGR-3	Skywatcher	Atlantic Squadron	SS Rafeal R Rivera (MCE hull 2337)	CNY	29 March 1955	29 March 1965	Sold for scrapping, 23 December 1970, to Dawood Cord., Ltd., of Karachi, Pakistan, resold to German buyers and again resold. In December 1971 arrived at Santander, Germany for scrapping
AGR-4	Searcher	Atlantic Squadron	SS James W Wheeler (MCE hull 2338)	CNY	2 April 1955	1 July 1965	Sold for scrapping, to North American Smelting Co., Wilmington, DE., delivered, 31, May 1970
AGR-5	Scanner	Pacific Squadron	SS Edwin D Howard (MCE hull 2344)	NNY	30 January 1956	21 July 1965	Sold for non-transportation use, 3 October 1974, to General Exploration Co., Dallas, TX., fate unknown
AGR-6	Locator	Pacific Squadron	SS Frank O Peterson (MCE hull 2347)	CNY	21 January 1956	9 August 1965	Sold for scrapping, 4 January 1975
AGR-7	Picket	Pacific Squadron	SS James F Harrell (MCE hull 3138)	NNY	8 February 1956	30 July 1965	Sold by MARAD for scrapping in 1978
AGR-8	Interceptor	Pacific Squadron	SS Edward W Burton (MCE hull 3147)	CNY	15 February 1956	5 July 1965	Scrapped, 16 February 1978
AGR-9	Investigator	Atlantic Squadron	SS Charles A Draper (MCE hull 2336)	CNY	16 January 1957	2 March 1965	Sold 15 May 1971, scrapped at Santandar, Spain
AGR-10	Outpost	Atlantic Squadron	SS Francis J O'Gara (MCE hull 3140)	PNY	6 February 1957	1 July 1965	Sold by MARAD, 17 February 1971 for scrapping at Bilbao, Spain
AGR-11	Protector	Atlantic Squadron	SS Warren P Marks (MCE hull 2346)	CNY	20 February 1957	28 July 1965	Sold for scrapping to All Star Metals, Brownsville, TX., scrapping completed 30 November 2005
AGR-12	Vigil	Atlantic Squadron	SS Raymond Van Brogen (MCE hull 2339)	PNY	5 March 1957	3 March 1965	Sold 23 November 1970, towed to Bilbao, Spain, 21 December 1970 for scrapping
AGR-13	Interdictor	Pacific Squadron	SS Edwin H Duff (MCE hull 3142)	CNY	7 April 1958	5 August 1965	Sold for non-transportation use to a Portland OR. buyer, fate unknown
AGR-14	Interpreter	Pacific Squadron	SS Dudley H Thomas (MCE hull 2341)	PNY	29 September 1958	1 July 1965	Sold for scrapping 4 November 1974
AGR-15	Tracer (ex-Interrupter)	Pacific Squadron	SS William J Riddle (MCE hull 2340)	CNY	16 October 1958	7 July 1965	Sold, 15 July 1974, by MARAD to Walco Vessels Ltd., for non-transportation use (PD-X-979 dated 5 June 1974) for $210,010.00, withdrawn from the Suisun Bay Reserve Fleet, 1 August 1974. Placed in commercial service as a fish processing plant at Unalaska, AK, renamed Unisea. Towed to China in 2000 for scrapping.
AGR-16	Watchman	Pacific Squadron	SS Vernon S Wood (MCE hull 2343)	CNY	5 January 1959	7 July 1965	Sold for scrapping, 3 October 1974 to American Ship Dismantlers
