= Jones Point, New York =

Jones Point
- hamlet
- Location of Jones Point in New York
- Coordinates: 41°17′10.16″N 73°57′22.77″W
- Country: United States
- State: New York
- County: Rockland

Jones Point is a hamlet located in the town of Stony Point in Rockland County in the state of New York, United States, located north of Tomkins Cove; east of Bear Mountain State Park; south of Iona Island; and west of the Hudson River. It is directly across the Hudson River from the city of Peekskill and lies at the foot of Dunderberg Mountain.

Although it is located in primarily suburban Rockland County, the hamlet is rural in character, making it an exurb of New York City. Over 85% of the hamlet is part of the Bear Mountain State Park.

Beginning in World War I, Jones Point was the home of the Jones Point Chemical Weapons Research Laboratory, which conducted projects on liquid propellants, incendiary compounds, and the chemical weapons phosgene and mustard gas.

The Hudson River National Defense Reserve Fleet was located off Jones Point from 1946 until 1971. It spanned from there to Tomkins Cove.

== Jones Point Chemical Weapons Research Laboratory ==
=== Lab ===
During the First World War, the U.S. Bureau of Mines was initially responsible for the research and development (R&D) of chemical weapons for the War Department, though later the responsibility would be transferred to the newly minted U.S. Army Chemical Warfare Service, the predecessor to the U.S. Army Chemical Corps. Much of their research was conducted at American University and Catholic University in Washington, D.C.; however, the Bureau needed a top-secret research facility away from the hustle and bustle of a major city, which at the time were believed to be filled with spies and sympathizers of Germany, and thus a security risk. The Bureau selected the American Potash Corp Plant at Jones Point, NY to be the site of the new clandestine chemical weapons research laboratory. The outpost was located on the western shore of the Hudson River, just south of Iona Island which at the time was the site of a U.S. Navy weapons depot, the Iona Island Arsenal.

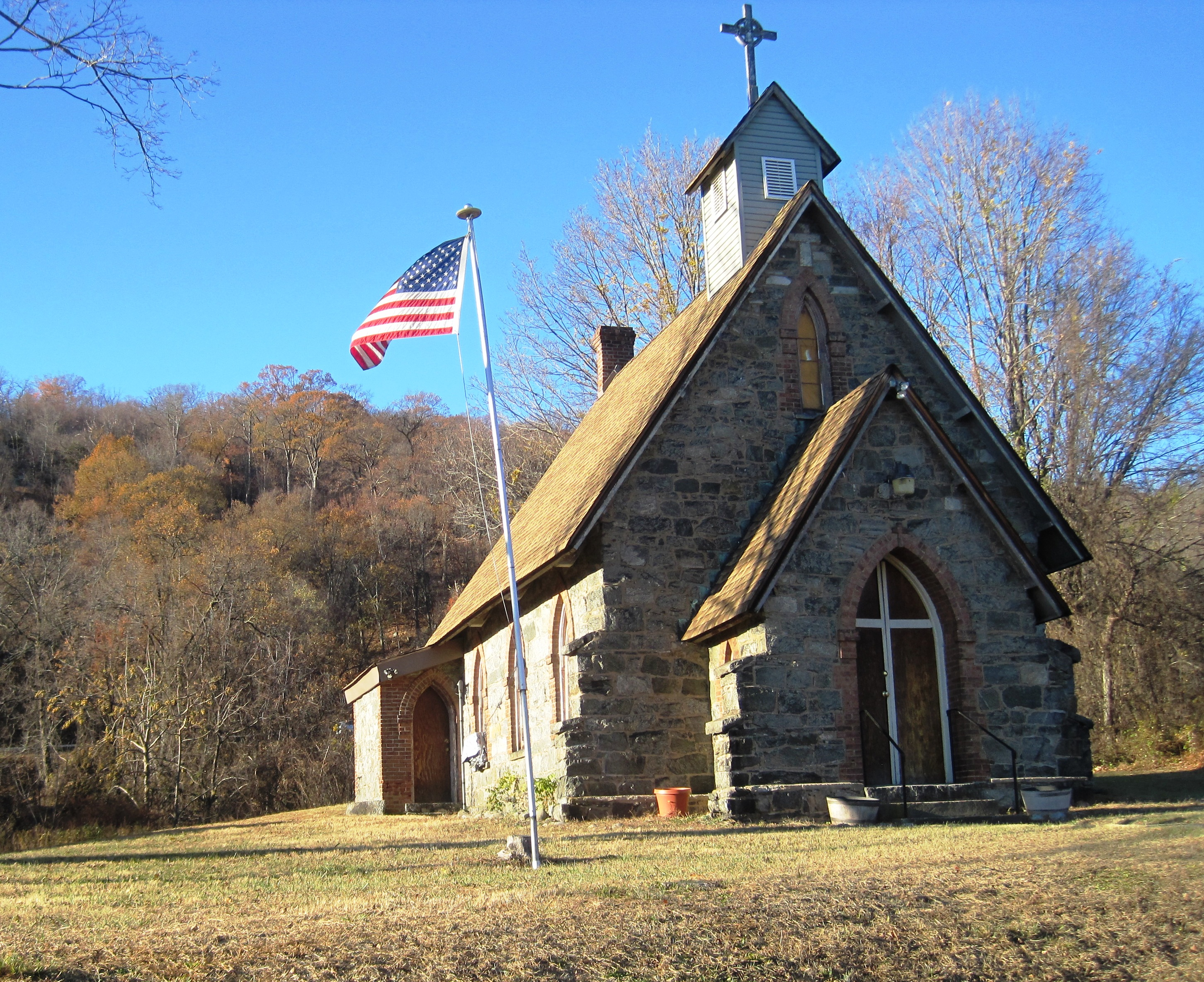
Turning Point Church

=== Scientists ===
One notable scientist at the site was Walter T. Scheele, code-named Dr. Smith. Scheele was a German-American chemist who developed explosive devices as part of a German terrorist cell operating in the United States during World War I, responsible for planting bombs on American merchant ships. After members of the cell were arrested by the FBI, and Scheele's involvement was discovered, he fled to Cuba. He was later arrested by Cuban authorities and extradited to the United States. As part of a plea agreement, Scheele agreed to assist in the United States' development of chemical weapons. He was brought to the Jones Point facility by his handler, FBI Special Agent Warren Grimes, code-named Warren White.

Thomas Edison's chemist, Bruce Silver, visited the site to work directly with Walter Scheele.

=== Research ===
The two primary research projects at the Jones Point Lab were the development of liquid oxygen as an explosive and the incendiary compound code-named Helline (hexamethylenetetramine / sodium peroxide). The Palisades Interstate Park Commission granted permission to scientists at Jones Point to conduct experiments with Helline at a nearby abandoned quarry as well as other condemned buildings in the area. Experiments were conducted with projectiles and rockets which launched fire and debris into the air that could be seen by the surrounding populace. Experiments were also conducted on the Hudson River, both on the surface and underwater.

Research into other chemical compounds for military use was also conducted the Jones Point facility, including the chemical warfare agents phosgene and mustard gas.

== Hudson River Reserve Fleet ==
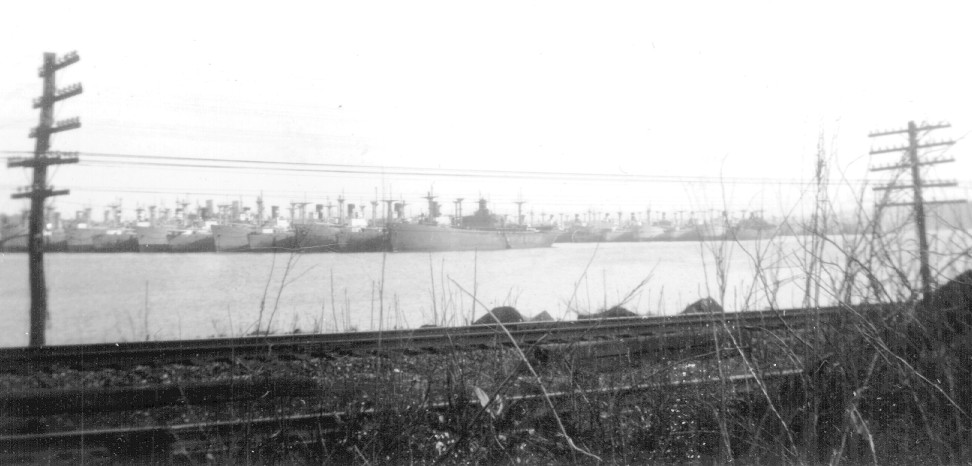
The Hudson River Reserve Fleet in the 1950s

In 1946 the Hudson River Reserve Fleet, known widely as the "Mothball Fleet", was moved from off Tarrytown in the Hudson north to Jones Point at the foot of Dunderberg Mountain.

The fleet was at its peak with 189 ships in July 1965. Anchored in ten rows, it extended from the fleet office at the Jones Point dock, several miles to the south to the Boulderberg House at Tomkins Cove. Several viewing points were established along Route 9W for the hundreds of motorists who stopped daily to look at the ships.

Sell-off and redeployment of ships to the James River Reserve Fleet in Virginia was rapid thereafter, with the last two vessels towed away in 1971.
