= Hudson River Reserve Fleet =

United States reserve fleet

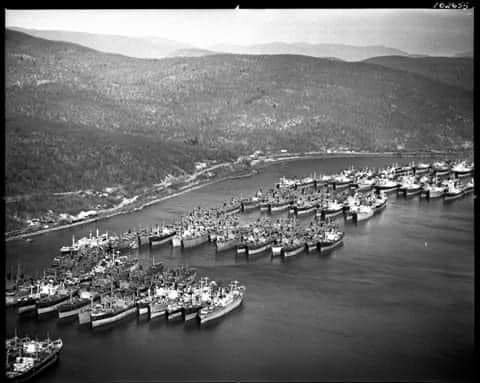
Mothball Fleet on the Hudson River southwest of Peekskill and North of Tomkins Cove, New York, 1960s

The Hudson River Reserve Fleet, formally the Hudson River National Defense Reserve Fleet and popularly the Mothball Fleet, was established by act of Congress in 1946 as a component of the National Defense Reserve Fleet. It was first located off Tarrytown, New York, on the Hudson River, one of eight anchorages in the United States to provide a sizable reserve of merchant ships to support any military need arising.

== History ==
=== Establishment ===
The Hudson River Reserve Fleet was established in the wake of World War II to provide an anchorage and place of maintenance for a part of the enormous numbers of combat vessels and transports surplussed by the return of peace. Originally anchored at Tarrytown, New York, it was moved further north on the Hudson River on April 30, 1946, to Jones Point at the foot of Dunderberg Mountain.

The fleet was anchored in ten rows, extending from the fleet office at the Jones Point dock several miles to the south to the Boulderberg House at Tomkins Cove. Several viewing points were established along U.S. Route 9W for the hundreds of motorists who stopped daily to look at the ships.

=== Inventory ===
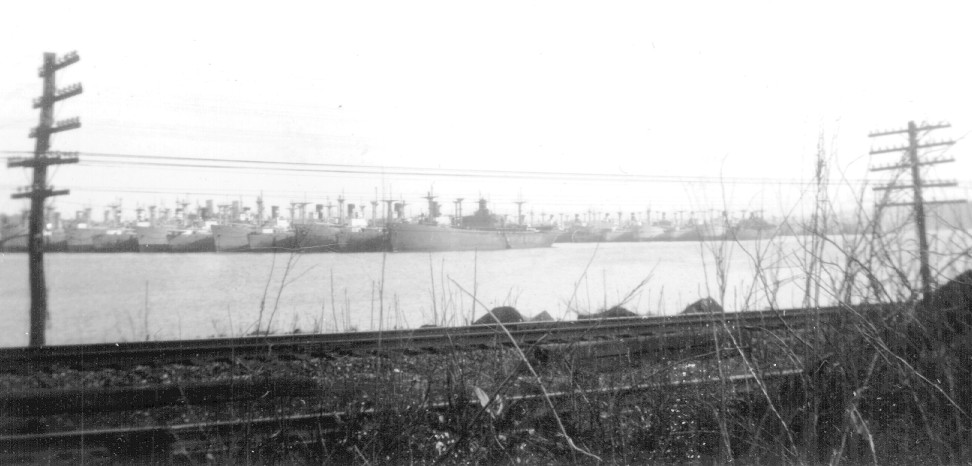
The Hudson River Reserve Fleet in the 1950s

During the Korean War, a total of 130 ships were taken from the Hudson River fleet leaving only 39 ships.

When the U.S. Department of Agriculture in 1953 needed storage space for large volumes of government-owned wheat, it turned to the Hudson River Reserve fleet. During the following ten years more than 53,563,948 bushels of wheat were loaded into 231 ships. A ventilation system had been installed in the ships, making it possible to maintain the quality of the wheat for long periods of storage. This saved the U.S. government some five million dollars on commercial storage estimates.

During the Suez Crisis in 1956, 35 ships were put back into service when British and French ships were diverted from trade routes to supply their nations' armed forces.

The Vietnam War required more than 40 ships.

=== Maintenance ===
The ships were kept in condition on a year-round basis by a crew of 86 men under the supervision of Charles R. Gindroz of Pearl River, fleet superintendent and one-time chief engineer on the SS George Washington. The reserve fleet ships, valued at over $255 million, had their machinery turned over periodically and their internal surfaces sprayed with a coat of preservative oil on a regular basis.

=== Closure ===
Other reserve fleets were anchored at Astoria, Oregon; Olympia, Washington; Suisun Bay, California; Mobile, Alabama; Beaumont, Texas; Wilmington, North Carolina; and James River, Virginia. The last two ships from the Hudson River fleet were towed away on July 8, 1971, to be sold for scrap to Spain. Ships not sold for scrap from it were transferred to the James River Reserve Fleet.
