= James River Reserve Fleet =

Reserve Fleet in Virginia

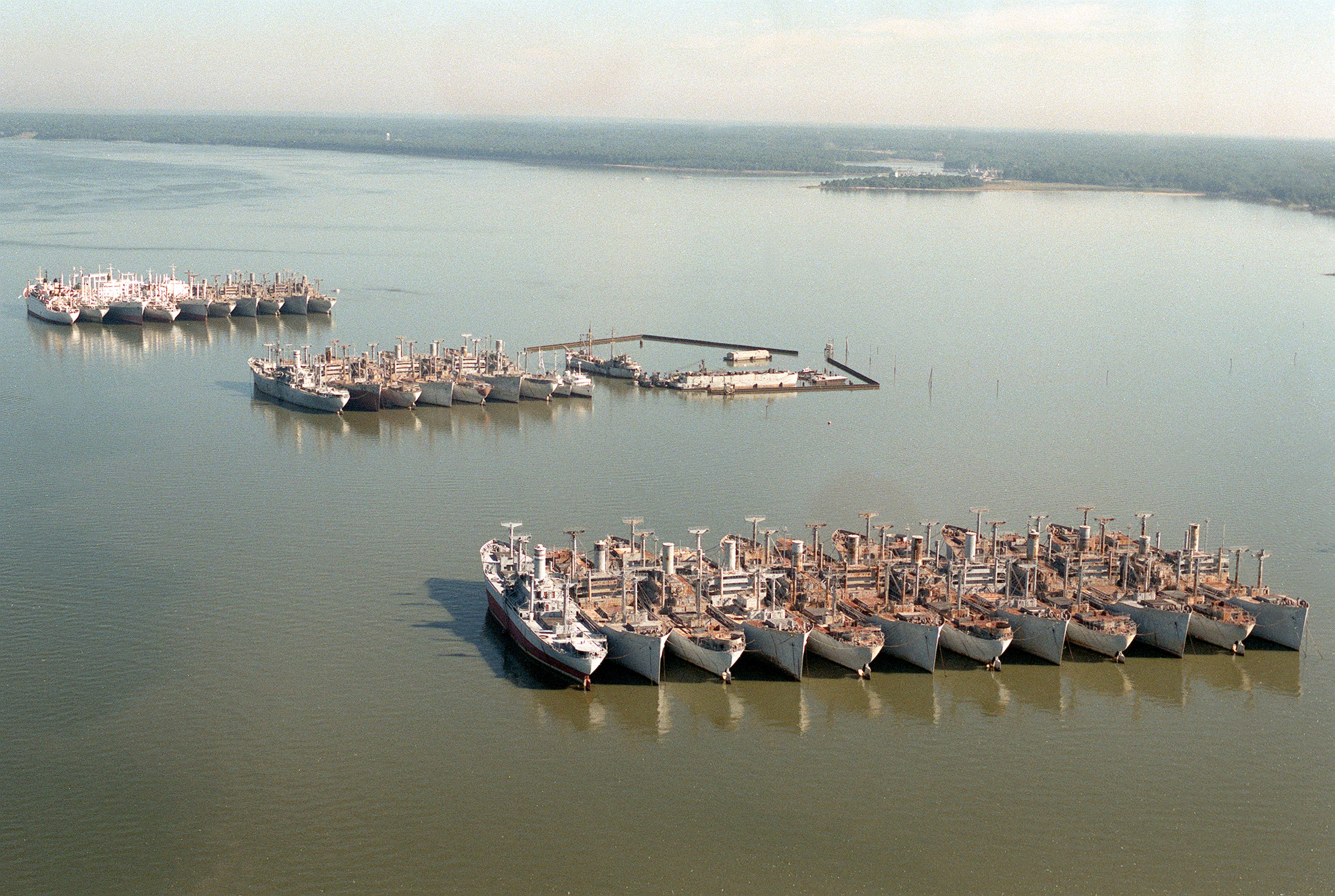
Part of the James River Fleet in 1990

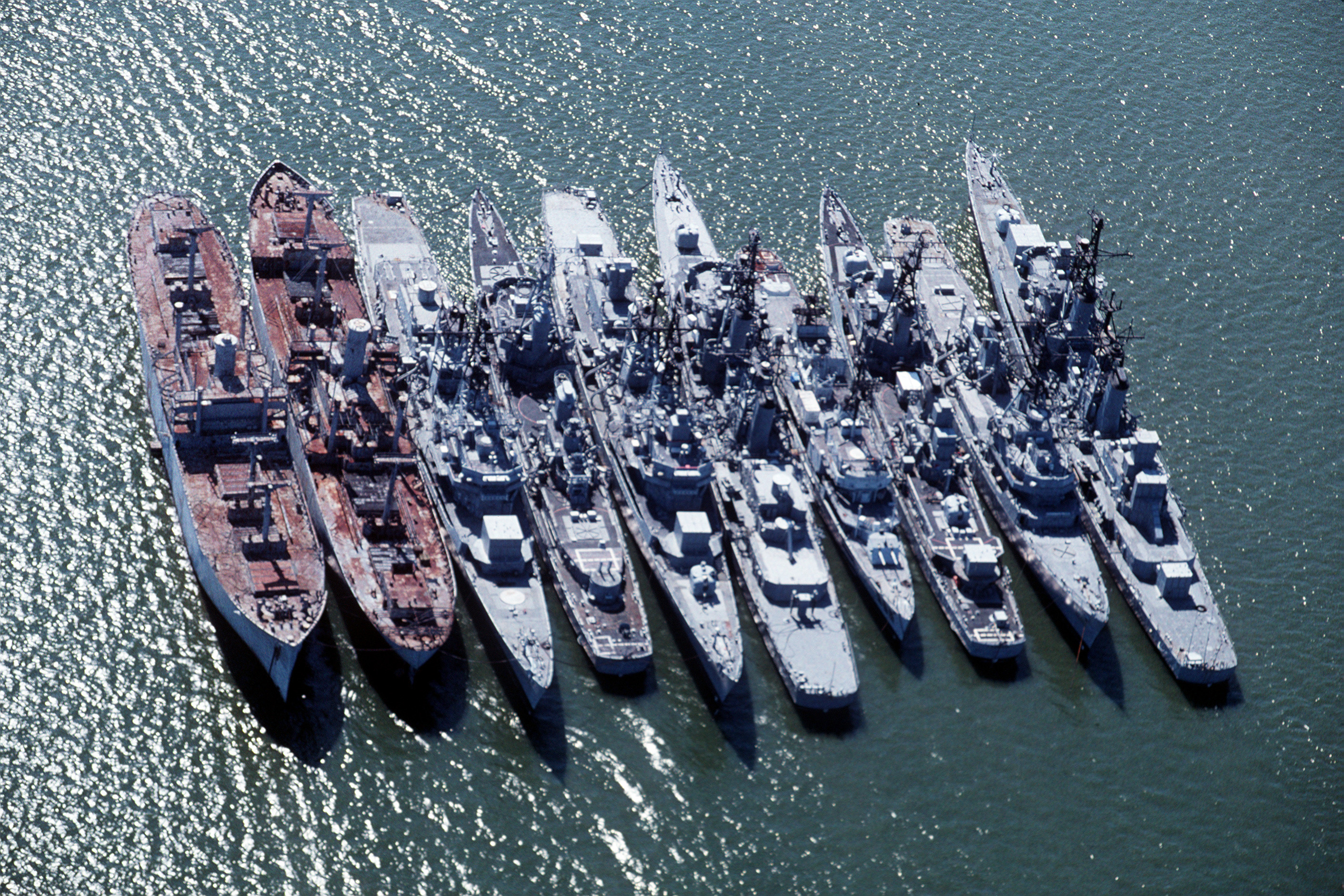
Decommissioned destroyers on James River in 1993

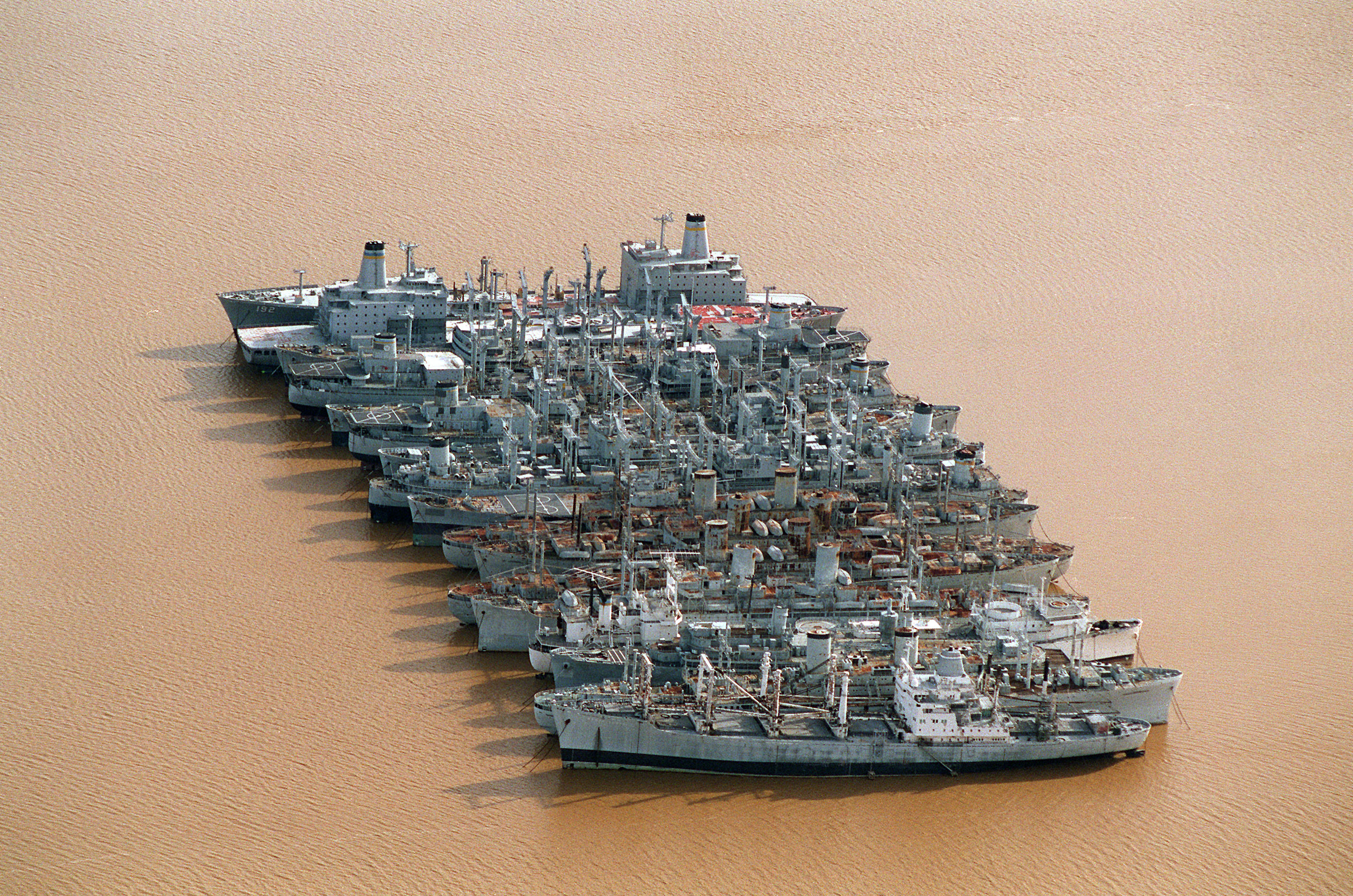
Inactive U.S. Navy auxiliary ships of the James River Reserve Fleet (1996)

The James River Reserve Fleet (JRRF) is located on the James River in the U.S. state of Virginia near Fort Eustis at (37.120393°N 76.646469°W). James River Reserve Fleet, a "ghost fleet", is part of the National Defense Reserve Fleet. The "mothballed" ships in storage are part of a reserve fleet, and can be called back up to active duty if needed. Many are awaiting scrapping due to the age or condition of the ship. Some ships are used for target practice or as artificial reefs. A few ships became museum ships and others sold to private companies. Ships can be readied for use in 20 to 120 days during national emergencies or natural disaster. The U.S. Department of Transportation's Maritime Administration (MARAD) provides oversight of the James River Reserve Fleet. For the United States Navy ships the United States Navy reserve fleets stored these ships and submarines.

The James River Reserve Fleet is the oldest National Defense Reserve Fleet (NDRF) opened in 1919. At the start of World War II all 300 ships in the fleet were put into service. The current Reserve Fleet was opened in 1946 to store and maintain the many surplus ships after World War II. Some ships there were reactivated for Korean War, Vietnam War and 600-ship Navy program. In the 1950s the fleet had over 800 ships, with all fleets having over 2,000 ships stored. Many of the ships were World War II Liberty ships and Victory ships. The other large Reserve Fleets in the 1950s are the Suisun Bay Reserve Fleet inland from San Francisco Bay and the Beaumont Reserve Fleet in Texas. As of December 2022, nine ships remain in the fleet.

== Special projects ==
- The fleet was used for surplus grain storage. Liberty ships laid up in the James River Reserve Fleet were used by the Commodity Credit Corporation for storage of surplus grain. In 1950s the United States Department of Agriculture purchased and store surplus grain in ship's cargo holds.
- The James River Reserve Fleet is also used for training. Teams train for search-and-seizure, hostage rescue, helicopter approach then hover and more.
- Part of the Reserve Fleet is a newer program called Ready Reserve Force (RRF).

== Inventory ==
As of November 2025:

Name	Division	Hull No.	Year built	Design	Home Port	Status
Retention - Roll-On/Roll-Off
Cape Diamond	Atlantic	AKR 5055	1972	G1-Dsl/F	JRRF, Ft. Eustis, VA	Logistics Support
Cape Ray	Atlantic	AKR 9679	1977	Dsl/Japan	JRRF, Ft. Eustis, VA	Logistics Support
Retention - Other
Choctaw County	Atlantic	T-EPF 2	2012	High Speed Catamaran	JRRF, Ft. Eustis, VA	Interim hold
Retention - Crane Ship
Flickertail State	Atlantic	T-ACS 5	1967	C5-S-MA73c	JRRF, Ft. Eustis, VA	Logistics Support
Retention - Break Bulk
Cape Ann	Atlantic	AK 5009	1962	C4-S-58a	JRRF, Ft. Eustis, VA	Training use
Cape Avinof	Atlantic	AK 5013	1963	C4-S-58a	JRRF, Ft. Eustis, VA	Training use
Non-retention - Roll-On/Roll-Off
1st Lt. Baldomero Lopez	Atlantic	T-AKR 3010	1985	RORO Combination	JRRF, Ft. Eustis, VA	Disposal
Non retention - Other
Invincible	Atlantic	T-AGM 24	1987	AGOS-1	JRRF, Ft. Eustis, VA	Disposal
Zeus	Atlantic	T-ARC 7	1982	Cable Repair	JRRF, Ft. Eustis, VA	Disposal
Custody - Tanker
Pecos	Atlantic	T-AO 197	1990	Fleet Replenishment Oiler	JRRF, Ft. Eustis, VA	Navy

== Notable former ships ==
- USS Guadalcanal (LPH-7), amphibious assault ship, was used as a target off Virginia Capes in May 1995. She was used to recover Gemini and Apollo astronauts in Atlantic Ocean.
- SS Charles H. Cugle, became the SS Sturgis (MH-1A), was a Liberty ship used to test nuclear power. A nuclear power plant was placed in her, used at the Panama Canal, scrapped in 2015.
- USNS General Hoyt S. Vandenberg (T-AGM-10). Sunk as an artificial reef in May 2009 off Key West.
- USS General Nelson M. Walker was a Troopship used in World War II, the Korean War and the Vietnam War. Art Beltrone, a military historian, found troop art in the stored ship, now on display.
- NS Savannah was stored for 14 years at James River, the first nuclear power cargo ship.
- USS Simon Lake (AS-33) a submarine tender, stored from 2015 to 2019, until scrapped.
- USS Donner (LSD-20) leaked 1,000 gallons of fuel in 2000.
- USS Suribachi (AE-21) a Suribachi-class ammunition ship scrapped in 2019.

SS Red Oak Victory

- SS Red Oak Victory, now a museum ship in Richmond, California. A Boulder Victory-class cargo ship.
- SS American Victory, a Victory cargo ship now a museum ship in Tampa, Florida.
- SS Arthur M. Huddell Liberty ship, now a Greek museum ship.
- SS John W. Brown Liberty ship, now a museum ship in Baltimore, Maryland.
- USS Waccamaw (AO-109), an oil tanker.
- MS Sea Witch (1940) Type C2 cargo ship.
- SS California (1927), the first major ocean liner built with turbo-electric transmission.
- USS Albemarle (AV-5), one of two Curtiss-class seaplane tenders, part of Operation Flat Top.
- MV Freedom Star, a NASA recovery ship.
- USS Kittiwake (ASR-13) and USS Ortolan (ASR-22), submarine rescue vessels.
- USS Escape (ARS-6), a Diver-class rescue and salvage ship.
- USNS LCPL Roy M. Wheat, a cargo ship built in the Soviet Union, delivering supplies to United States Marine Corps, into Fleet March 31, 2021.
- USS Gage (APA-168), last existing Haskell-class attack transport.
- MV Cape Lambert (T-AKR-5077) and MV Cape Lobos (T-AKR-5078), Roll-on/roll-off ships in fleet 1987 to 1990. Activated in 1990 to support Operation Desert Storm and Desert Shield, back in fleet in 2000.
- USS Matsonia (ID-1589), Troopship built in 1913.

== See also ==
- Atlantic Reserve Fleet, Norfolk
- Project Liberty Ship
- Naval Inactive Ship Maintenance Facility
