= List of Victory ships (A) =

This is a list of Victory ships with names beginning with A.

== Description ==
A Victory ship was a cargo ship. The cargo ships were 455 feet 3 inches (138.76 m) overall, 436 feet 6 inches (133.05 m) between perpendiculars They had a beam of 62 feet 0 inches (18.90 m), a depth of 38 feet 0 inches (11.58 m) and a draught of 28 feet 0 inches (8.53 m). They were assessed at 7,612 GRT, 4,555 NRT and 10,750 DWT.

The ships were powered by a triple expansion steam engine, driving a steam turbine via double reduction gear. This gave the ship a speed of 15.5 knots (28.7 km/h) or 16.5 knots (30.6 km/h), depending on the machinery installed.

Liberty ships had five holds. No. 1 hold was 57 feet 6 inches (17.53 m) long, with a capacity of 81,715 cubic feet (2,313.9 m^{3}), No. 2 hold was 45 feet 0 inches (13.72 m) long, with a capacity of 89,370 cubic feet (2,531 m^{3}), No. 3 hold was 78 feet 0 inches (23.77 m) long, with a capacity of 158,000 cubic feet (4,500 m^{3}), No. 4 hold was 81 feet 0 inches (24.69 m) long, with a capacity of 89,370 cubic feet (2,531 m^{3}) and No. 5 hold was 75 feet 0 inches (22.86 m) long, with a capacity of 81,575 cubic feet (2,309.9 m^{3}).

In wartime service, they carried a crew of 62, plus 28 gunners. The ships carried four lifeboats. Two were powered, with a capacity of 27 people and two were unpowered, with a capacity of 29 people.

== Aberdeen Victory ==
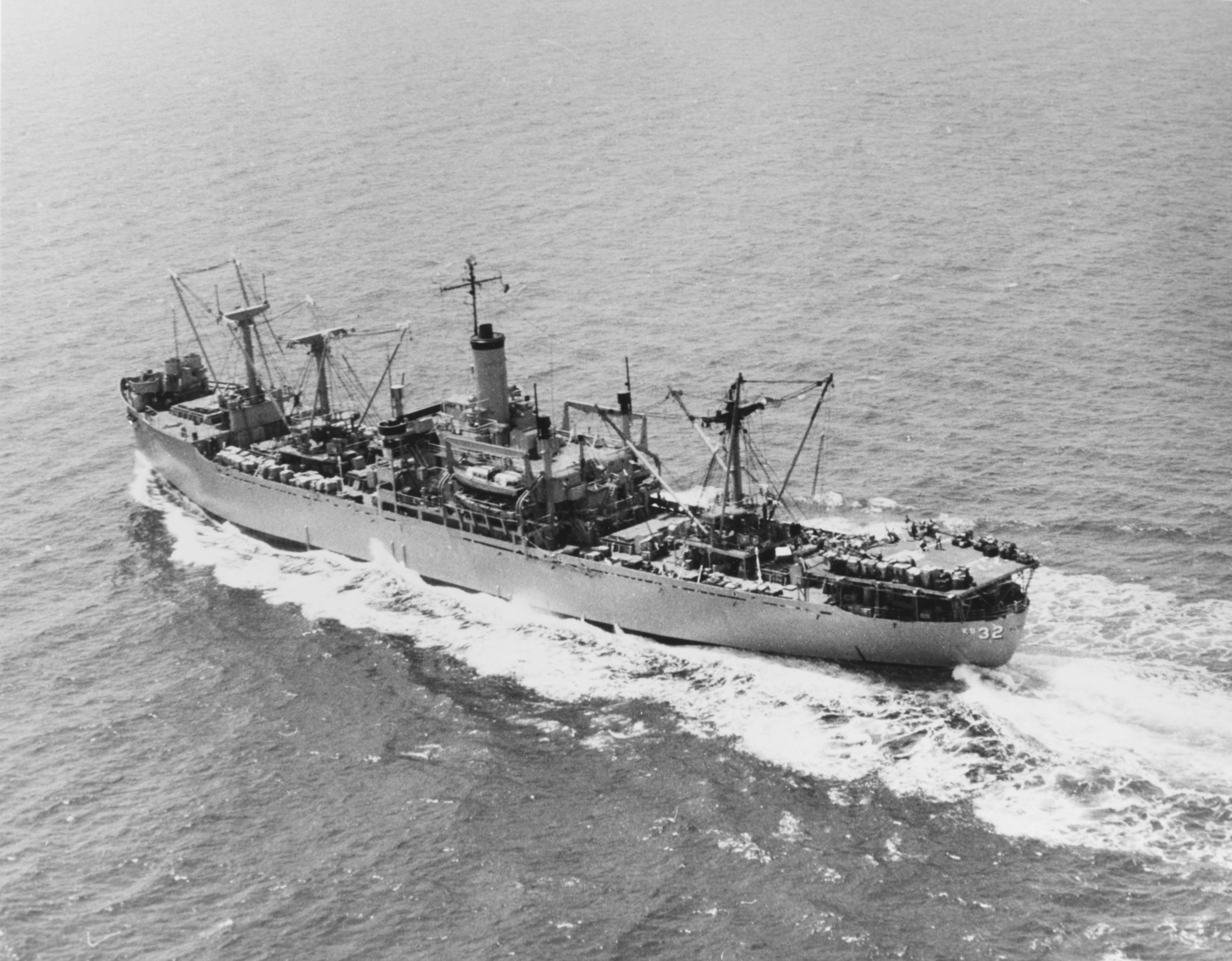
USS Altair

Aberdeen Victory was built by Oregon Shipbuilding Corporation, Portland, Oregon. Her keel was laid on 20 April 1944. She was launched on 30 May and delivered on 23 June. Built for the War Shipping Administration (WSA), she was operated under the management of Waterman Steamship Corporation. She was laid up in the James River in 1948. To the United States Navy in 1951 and renamed Altair. Converted to a stores issue ship at Norfolk Navy Yard, Norfolk, Virginia. She was decommissioned in May 1969 and laid up in the James River. She was sold in 1974 for scrapping at Cleveland, Ohio.

== Adelphi Victory ==
Adelphi Victory was built by Permanente Metals Corporation, Richmond, California. Her keel was laid on 22 April 1945. She was launched on 2 June and delivered on 27 June. Built for the WSA, she was operated under the management of Marine Transport Line. She was laid up in the James River in 1947. It was planned that she would become a special project ship for NASA in 1966, operated by the United States Navy as Adelphi. However, the plan was not proceeded with and she was operated in commercial service under charter. She was laid up in Suisun Bay in 1973, and scrapped in China in 1993.

== Adrian Victory ==
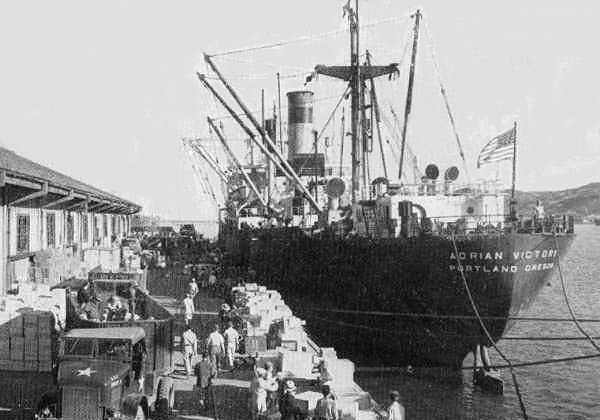
Adrian Victory

Adrian Victory was built by Oregon Shipbuilding Corporation. Her keel was laid on 15 December 1944. She was launched on 26 January 1945 and delivered on 3 March. Built for the WSA, she was operated under the management of Northland Transportation Company. She was laid up in the James River in 1948. Sold in 1951 to American-Hawaiian Steamship Company, New York and renamed Panaman. Sold in 1956 to Matson Navigation Company, Honolulu, Hawaii and renamed Hawaiian Traveller. Sold in 1961 to Ocean Cargoes Inc. and renamed Joseph. Sold in 1962 to Sea Tramp Corp and renamed Olga. Sold in 1967 to North East Shipping Corp. and renamed Battle Creek. Renamed St. Joan in 1969. She was scrapped at Kaohsiung, Taiwan in August 1969.

== Aiken Victory ==
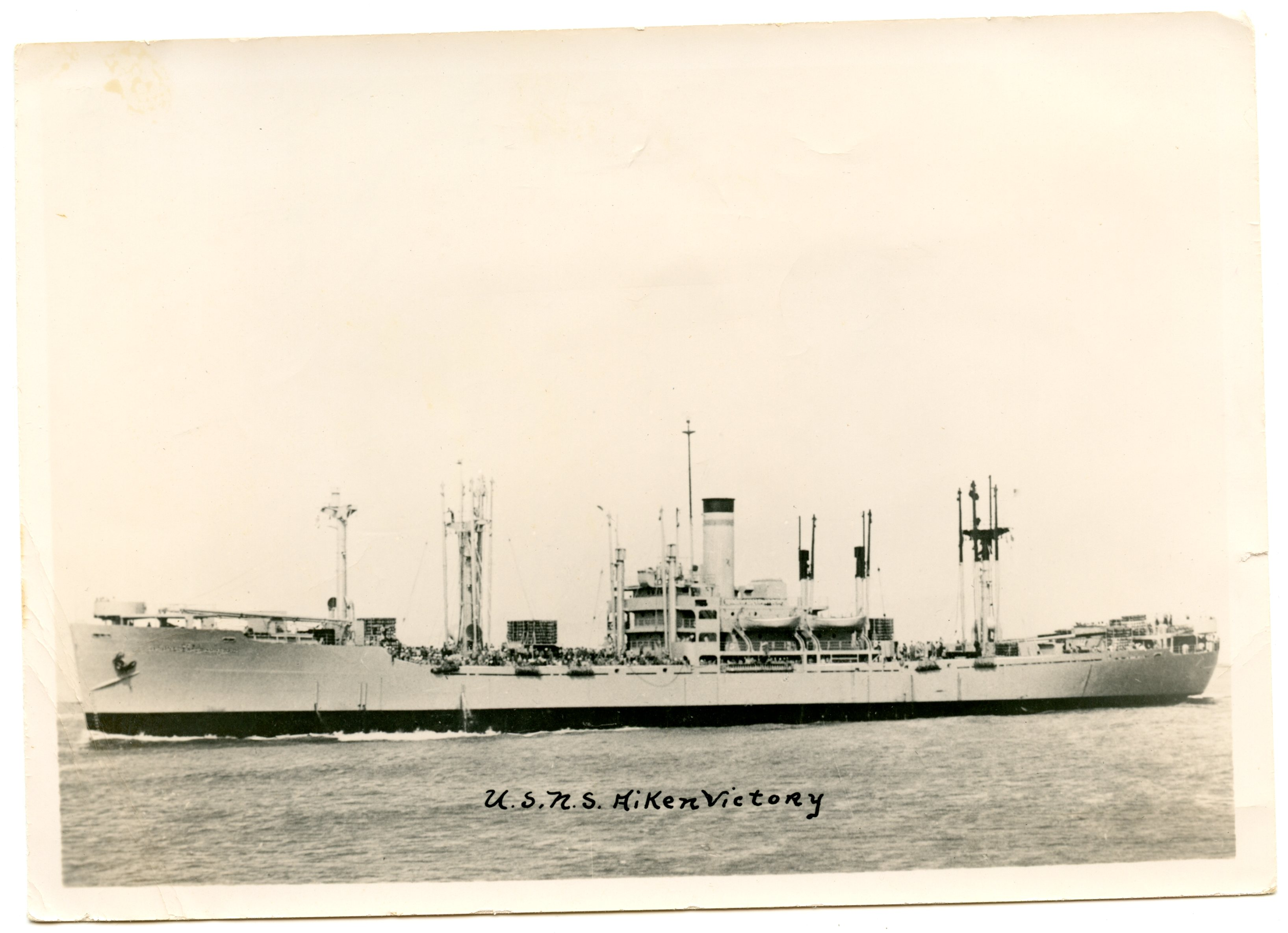
USNS Aiken Victory

Aiken Victory was built by Bethlehem Fairfield Shipyard, Baltimore, Maryland. Her keel was laid on 13 October 1944. She was launched on 30 November and delivered on 30 December. Built for the WSA, she was operated under the management of Mississippi Shipping Co. She was laid up in Suisun Bay in 1947. To the United States Navy in 1950, then to the Military Sea Transportation Service (MSTS). Used as a troopship. To the United States Maritime Administration in 1952. Laid up at Olympia, Washington, she was scrapped at Portland, Oregon in September 1971.

== Alamo Victory ==
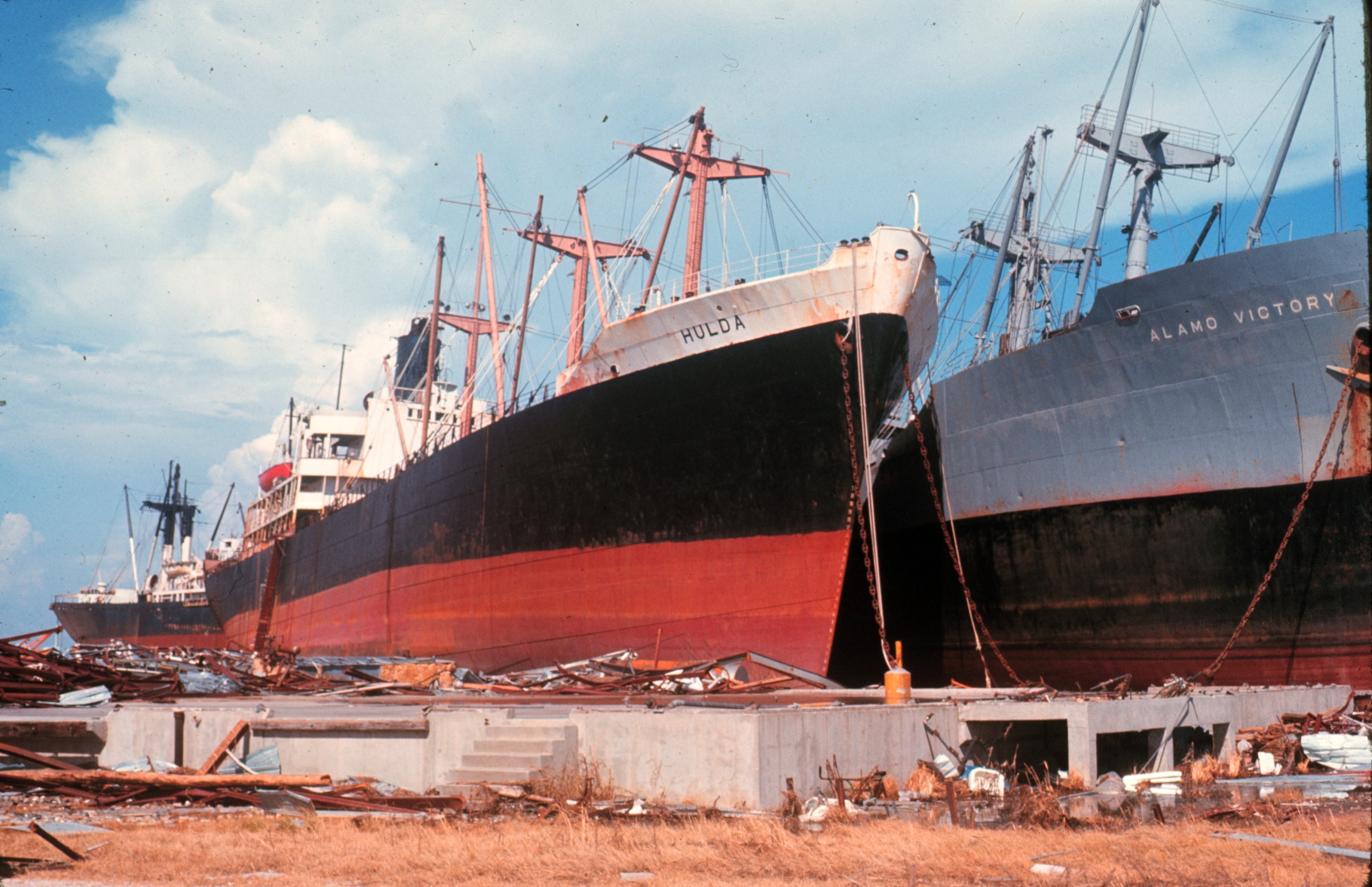
Hulda and Alamo Victory at Gulfport, Mississippi following Hurricane Camille.

Alamo Victory was built by California Shipbuilding Corporation, Terminal Island, Los Angeles, California. Her keel was laid on 25 May 1944. She was launched on 13 July and delivered on 18 August. Built for the WSA, she was operated under the management of Isthmian Steamship Company. Laid up in Suisun Bay in 1949. Sold in 1950 to States Marine Lines Inc. Laid up in Suisun Bay in 1951. She was returned to service in 1965 due to the Vietnam War. She collided with the steamship Hulda and the Victory ship Silver Hawk and was driven ashore at Gulfport, Mississippi during Hurricane Camille on 18 August 1969. She was refloated on 20 September and found to be severely damaged. Laid up at Beaumont, Texas, she was scrapped at New Orleans, Louisiana in March 1971.

== Albion Victory ==
Albion Victory was built by Bethlehem Fairfield Shipyard. Her keel was laid on 11 November 1944. She was launched on 5 January 1945 and delivered on 31 January. Built for the WSA, she was operated under the management of A. H. Bull & Co. She was laid up at Wilmington, Delaware in 1947. Returned to service in 1965 due to the Vietnam War. She suffered a boiler explosion and caught fire at Mobile, Alabama on 27 December 1967 and was severely damaged. She was laid up at Mobile, then later in the James River. She was scrapped at Alang, India in 1994.

== Alcoa Cavalier ==
Alcoa Cavalier was built by Oregon Shipbuilding Corporation. Her keel was laid on 11 August 1945. She was launched on 2 October 1946 and delivered on 22 April 1947. A cargo liner, she was sold to Alcoa Steamship Co., New York. Sold to the United States Department of Commerce, Federal Maritime Board in 1963 and laid up at Mobile. She was scrapped at New Orleans in 1968.

== Alcoa Clipper ==
Alcoa Clipper was built by Oregon Shipbuilding Corporation. Her keel was laid on 9 August 1945. She was launched on 28 September 1946 and delivered on 8 April 1947. A cargo liner. Built for Alcoa Steamship Co. Returned to the United States Government in 1963 and laid up at Mobile. She was scrapped at Baltimore, Maryland in 1969.

== Alcoa Corsair ==
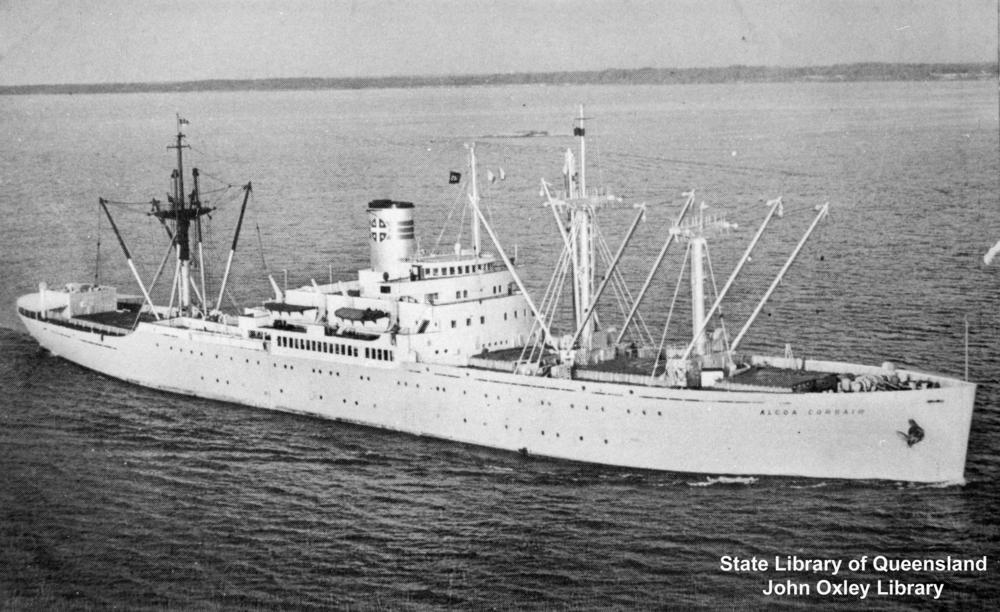
Alcoa Corsair

Alcoa Corsair was built by Oregon Shipbuilding Corporation. Her keel was laid as USS Iredell on 11 August 1945. She was launched as Alcoa Corsair on 2 October 1947. A cargo liner. To Alcoa Steamship Co. She collided with the Italian motor vessel Lorenzo Marcello in the Mississippi River at Empire, Louisiana on 22 October 1960 whilst on a voyage from New Orleans to the Caribbean. She was beached and later refloated. Sold in a damaged condition in March 1961 to American Bulk Carriers Inc., New York. Repaired and returned to service. Renamed Rye in 1963. She developed boiler defects in June 1963 whilst on a voyage from Houston, Texas to Bombay, India, where she arrived on 29 June. She departed from Bombay in September 1963 bound for Kobe, Japan for scrapping.

== Alfred Victory ==
Alfred Victory was built by Permanente Metals Corporation. Her keel was laid on 28 February 1945. She was launched on 11 April and delivered on 7 May. Built for the WSA, she was operated under the management of Hammond Shipping Company. She was laid up in the James River in 1947. It was planned that she would become a special project ship for NASA in 1966, operated by the United States Navy as Antioch. However, the plan was not proceeded with and she was operated in commercial service under charter. Subsequently, laid up in Suisun Bay, She was scrapped at Kaohsiung in 1988.

== Alhambra Victory ==
Alhambra Victory was built by California Shipbuilding Corporation. Her keel was laid on 6 December 1944. She was launched on 31 January 1945 and delivered on 28 February. Built for the WSA, she was operated under the management of American Mail Line. Laid up in Suisun Bay post-war, she was sold for scrapping in 1974 and was scrapped at Portland, Oregon in 1976.

== Allegheny Victory ==
Allegheny Victory was built by Permanente Metals Corporation. Her keel was laid on 28 April 1945. She was launched on 9 June and delivered on 6 July. Built for the WSA, she was operated under the management of Olympic Steamship Company. Laid up at Beaumont in 1950, she was scrapped at Alang in 1993.

== Allendale ==
Allendale was built by California Shipbuilding Corporation. Her keel was laid on 1 July 1944. She was launched on 9 September and delivered to the United States Navy on 21 November. To the United States Maritime Commission (USMC) in 1946 and laid up in the James River. She was scrapped at Kaohsiung in 1989.

== Alma Victory ==
Alma Victory was built by Oregon Shipbuilding Corporation. Her keel was laid on 3 May 1945. She was launched on 21 June and delivered on 20 July. Built for the WSA, she was operated under the joint management of Pacific-Atlantic Steamship Company and States Steamship Company. Laid up in the Hudson River in 1948, she was sold in 1949 and then laid up at Beaumont in 1950. Sold in 1962 to Cargo Ships & Tankers Inc., New York. Sold in 1971 to Oswego Steamship Co. Inc., New York and renamed Alma. She was scrapped in Taiwan in 1971.

== Altoona Victory ==
Altoona Victory was built by Bethlehem Fairfield Shipyard. Her keel was laid on 4 June 1945. She was launched on 24 July and delivered on 29 August. Built for the WSA, she was operated under the management of American Export Line. Laid up in the James River in 1946, she was sold in 1947 to Flota Mercante del Estado, Buenos Aires, Argentina and renamed Rio Atuel. Sold in 1961 to Empresa Linea Maritimas Argentinas, Buenos Aires. Laid up at Buenos Aires in 1974, she was scrapped at Campana, Argentina in 1978.

== Amarillo Victory ==
Amarillo Victory was built by California Shipbuilding Corporation. Her keel was laid on 8 May 1945. She was launched on 1 July and delivered on 2 August. Built for the WSA, she was operated under the management of States Marine Corp. She was laid up at Wilmington, Delaware in 1947 and later transferred to Beaumont. She was scrapped at Tuxpan, Mexico in 1995.

== American Victory ==
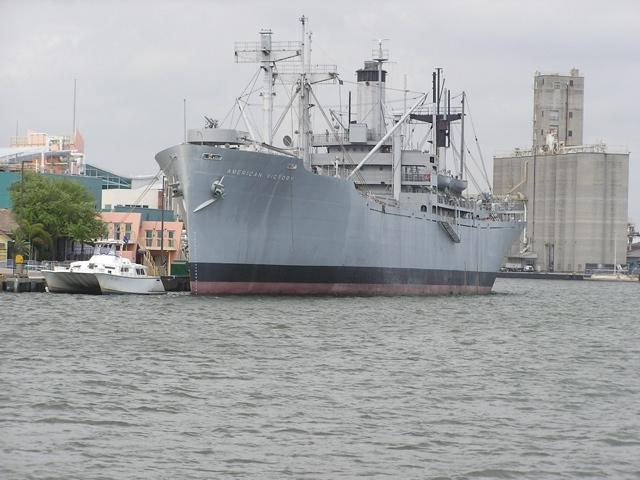
American Victory

American Victory was built by California Shipbuilding Corporation. Her keel was laid on 30 March 1945. She was launched on 24 May and delivered on 20 June. Built for the WSA, she was operated under the management of Hammond Shipping Company. Chartered to American Export Line in 1946, she was laid up in the Hudson River in 1947. Chartered to the United States Navigation Co. in 1951, she was laid up at Beaumont in 1954. It was planned that she would become a special project ship for NASA in 1966, operated by the United States Navy as Carthage. However, the plan was not proceeded with and she was operated in commercial service under charter. Laid up in the James River in 1969. Now a museum ship.

== Ames Victory ==
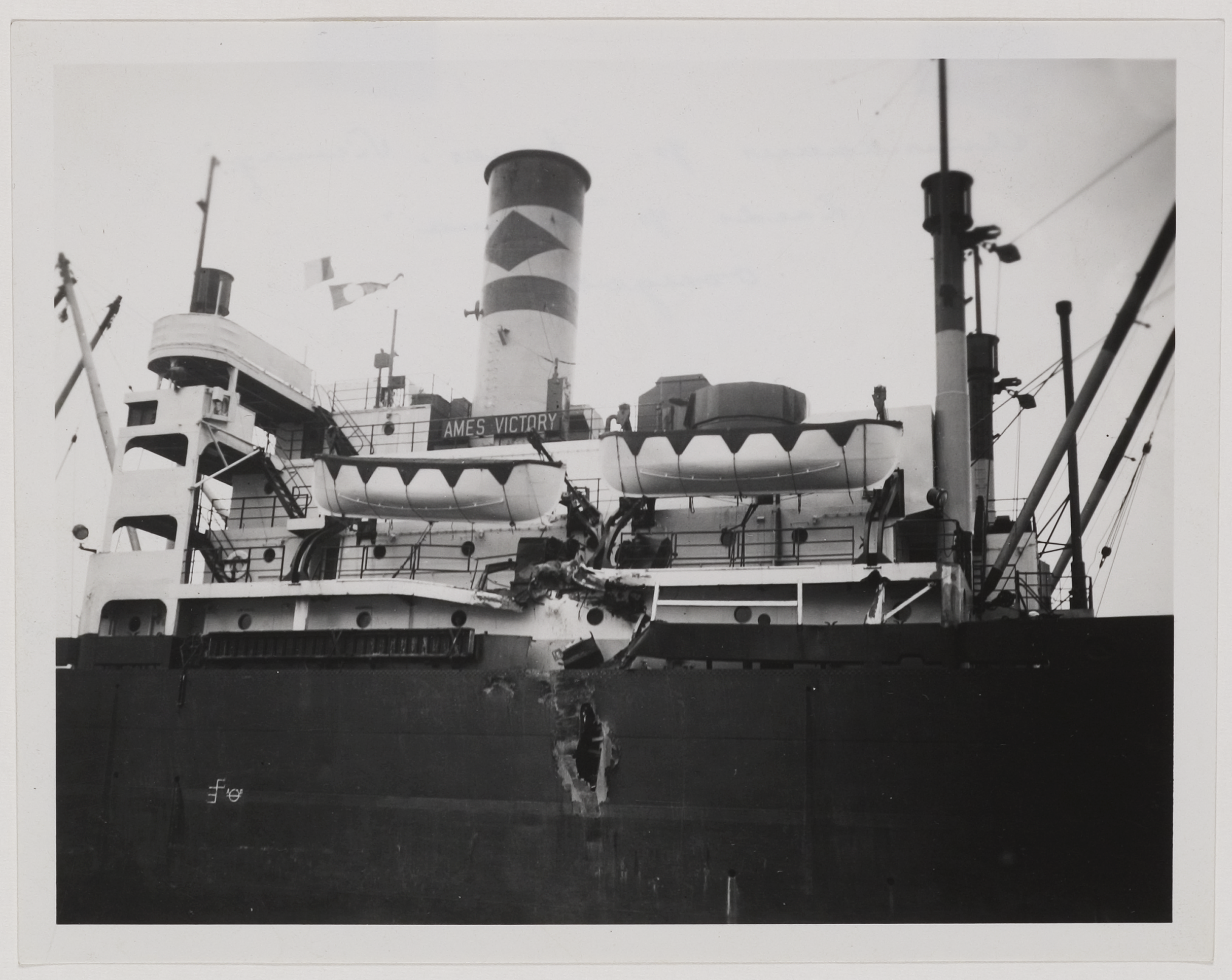
Ames Victory showing damage midships after colliding being run into by a Swedish vessel in 1948.

Ames Victory was built by Oregon Shipbuilding Corporation. Her keel was laid on 12 December 1944. She was launched on 23 January 1945 and delivered on 24 February. Built for the WSA, she was operated under the management of Coastwise Line. Laid up at Beaumont in 1949, she was sold to Victory Carriers Inc., New York later that year. She was scrapped at Kaohsiung in February 1969.

== Amherst Victory ==
Amherst Victory was built by California Shipbuilding Corporation. Her keel was laid on 9 January 1945. She was launched on 28 February and delivered on 26 March. Built for the WSA, she was operated under the management of International Freighting Corporation. Laid up in the James River in 1946, she was sold in 1947 to A/S Det Østasiatiske Kompagni, Copenhagen, Denmark and renamed Serampore. Sold in 1954 to Denizcilik Bankasi, Istanbul, Turkey and renamed Manisa. Sold in 1955 to D. B. Deniz Nakliyati, Istanbul. She was scrapped at Aliağa, Turkey in 1977.

== Anadarko Victory ==
Anadarko Victory was built by California Shipbuilding Corporation. Her keel was laid on 3 November 1944. She was launched on 27 December and delivered on 31 January 1945. Built for the WSA, she was operated under the management of Lykes Brothers Steamship Company. She was laid up at Mobile in 1948. Sold in 1951 to Lykes Brothers Steamship Company and renamed Charlotte Lykes. To the United States Department of Commerce in 1962, laid up in Suisun Bay. Renamed Anadarko Victory in 1966. She was scrapped in Suisun Bay in October 1970.

== Anchorage Victory ==
Anchorage Victory was built by Permanente Metals Corporation. Her keel was laid on 28 September 1944. She was launched on 28 November and delivered on 6 January 1945. Built for the WSA, she was operated under the management of Coastwise Line. Laid up at Wilmington, Delaware in 1948, she was later transferred to the James River. She was scrapped at Alang in 1992.

== Anniston Victory ==
Anniston Victory was built by Permanente Metals Corporation. Her keel was laid on 8 December 1944. She was launched on 26 January 1945 and delivered on 24 February. Built for the WSA, she was operated under the management of Coastwise Line. Laid up at Wilmington, Delaware in 1948, she was later transferred to Beaumont. She was scrapped there in 1985.

== Antioch Victory ==
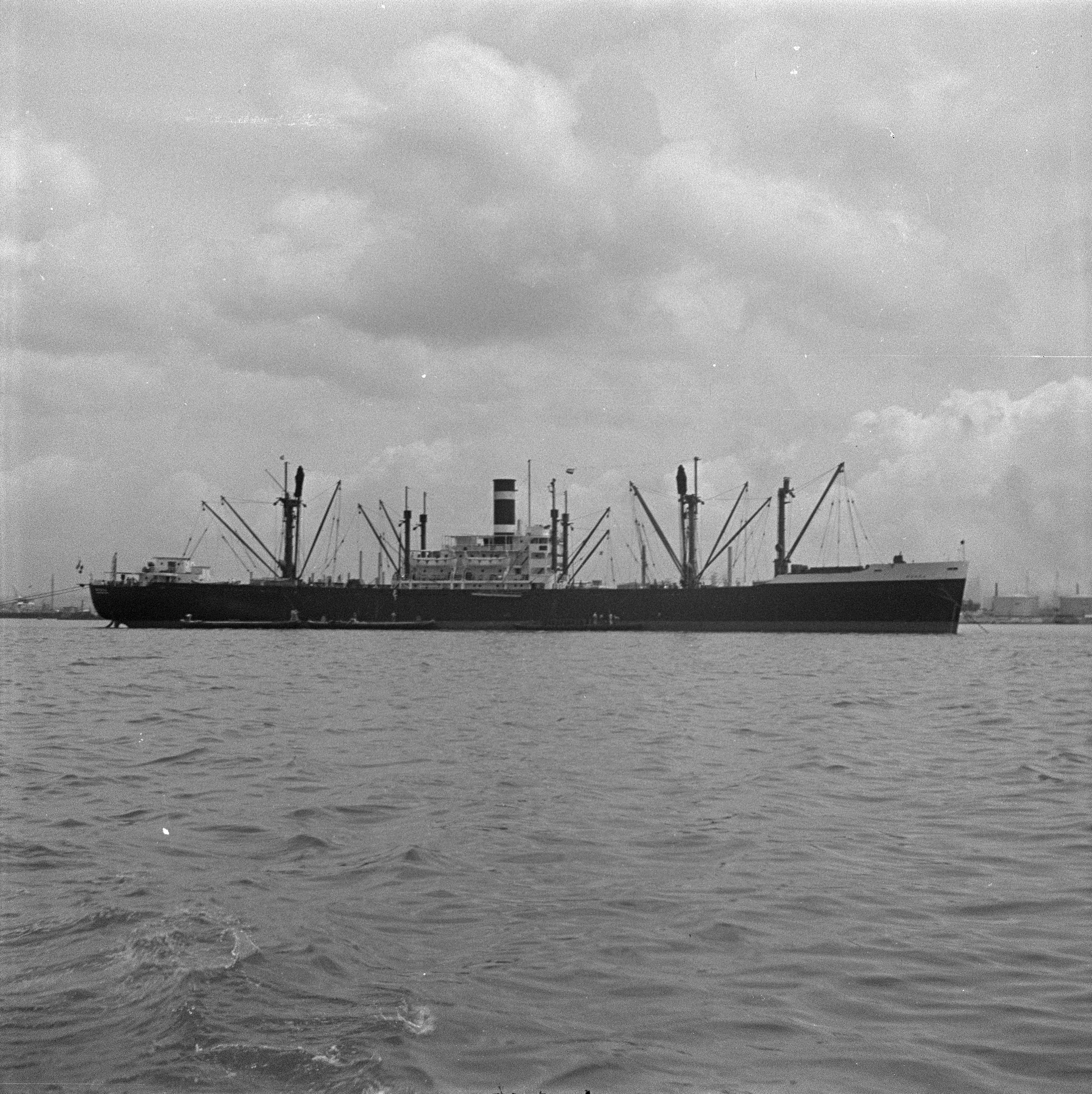
Breda

Antioch Victory was built by Bethlehem Fairfield Shipyard. Her keel was laid on 12 March 1945. She was launched on 2 May and delivered on 25 May. Built for the WSA, she was operated under the management of Wessel Duval & Company. Laid up at Wilmington, Delaware in 1947, she was sold later that year to Koninklijke Nederlandse Stoomboot-Maatschappij, Amsterdam, Netherlands and renamed Breda. Sold in 1966 to Trade Lines Inc., Piraeus, Greece and renamed Trade Ambassador. She put back to Recife, Brazil on 26 June 1970 after developing boiler problems whilst on a voyage from Recife to Saigon, Vietnam. She sailed again on 7 July but again had to put back. She subsequently reached Saigon and was sold. She was scrapped at Kaohsiung in November 1970.

== Appleton Victory ==
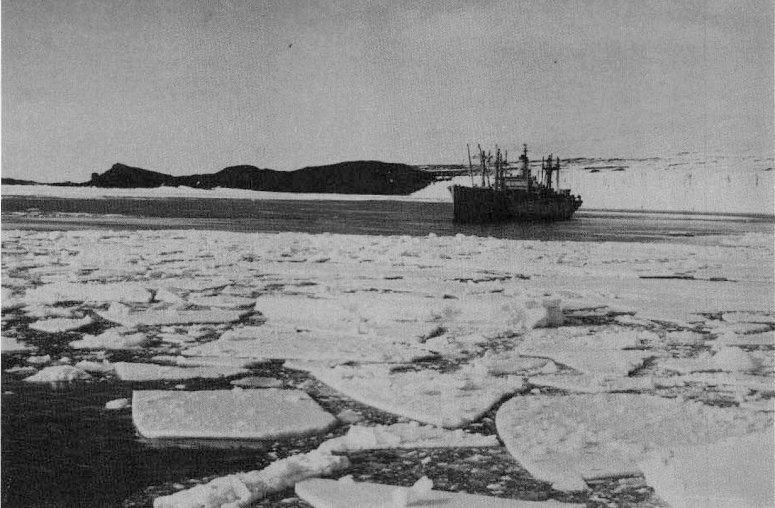
USNS Private John R. Towle

Appleton Victory was built by Oregon Shipbuilding Corporation. Her keel was laid on 9 December 1944. She was launched on 19 January 1945 and delivered on 23 March. Built for the WSA, she was operated under the management of American Mail Line. To the United States Army Transportation Corps in 1946 and renamed Private John. R. Towle. To the United States Navy in 1950. To the United States Maritime Administration in 1980 and laid up in the James River. She was sold for scrapping in 1982.

== Arcadia Victory ==
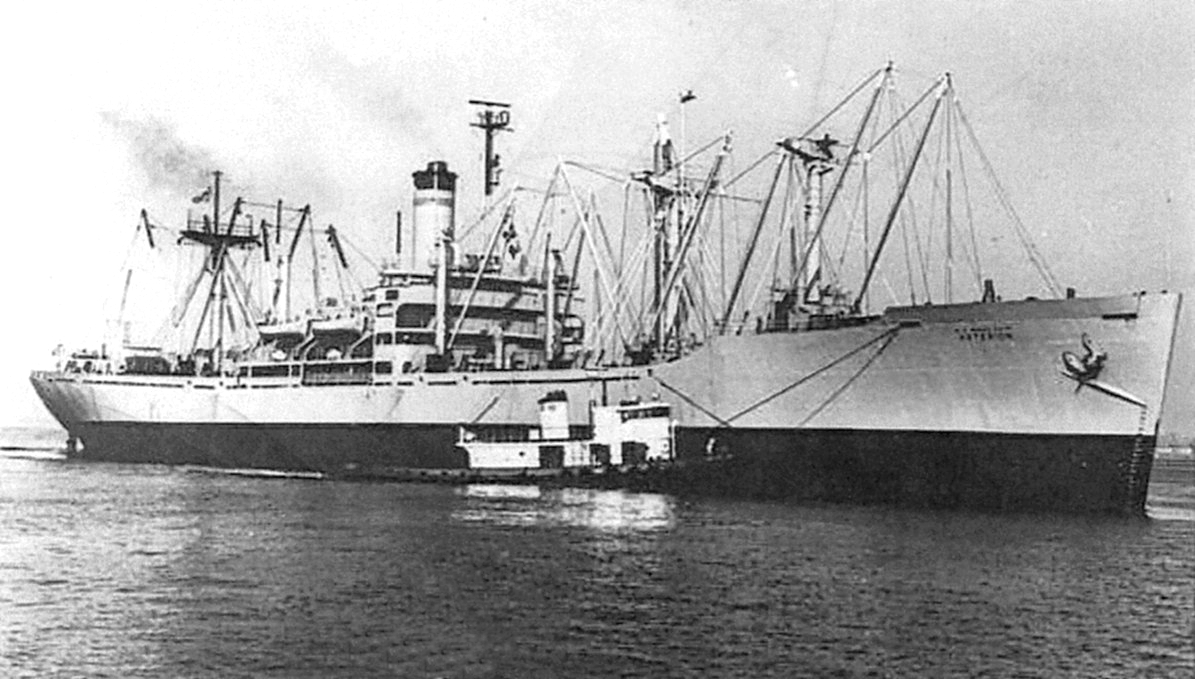
USNS Asterion

Arcadia Victory was built by California Shipbuilding Corporation. Her keel was laid on 10 May 1944. She was launched on 1 July and delivered on 22 September. Built for the WSA, she was operated under the management of American President Lines. She was laid up at Astoria, Oregon in 1950 and subsequently transferred to Suisun Bay. To MSTS in 1962 and renamed Asterion. Converted to a refrigerated storeship by Willamette Iron and Steel Works, Portland, Oregon. She was sold for scrapping in 1973.

== Arenac ==
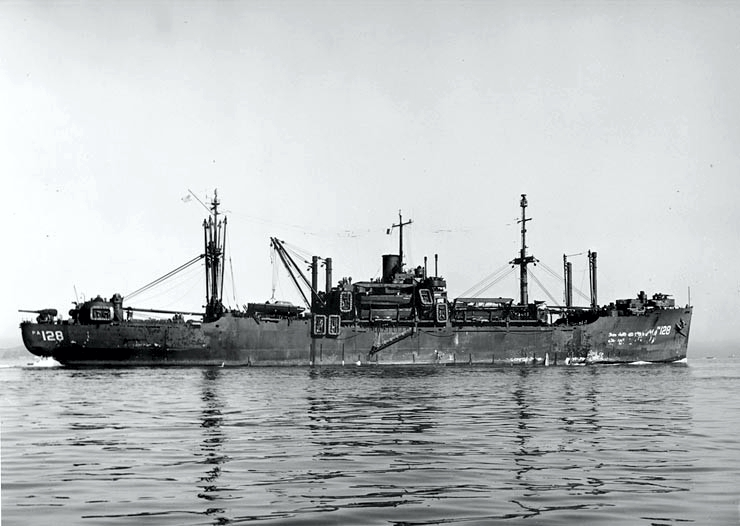
USS Arenac

Arenac was built by California Shipbuilding Corporation. Her keel was laid on 9 July 1944. She was launched on 14 September and delivered on 28 December. Built for the United States Navy. She was laid up in reserve in 1946. To the United States Maritime Administration in 1959. Laid up in the James River. She was scrapped at Brownsville, Texas in 1974.

== Arlington ==
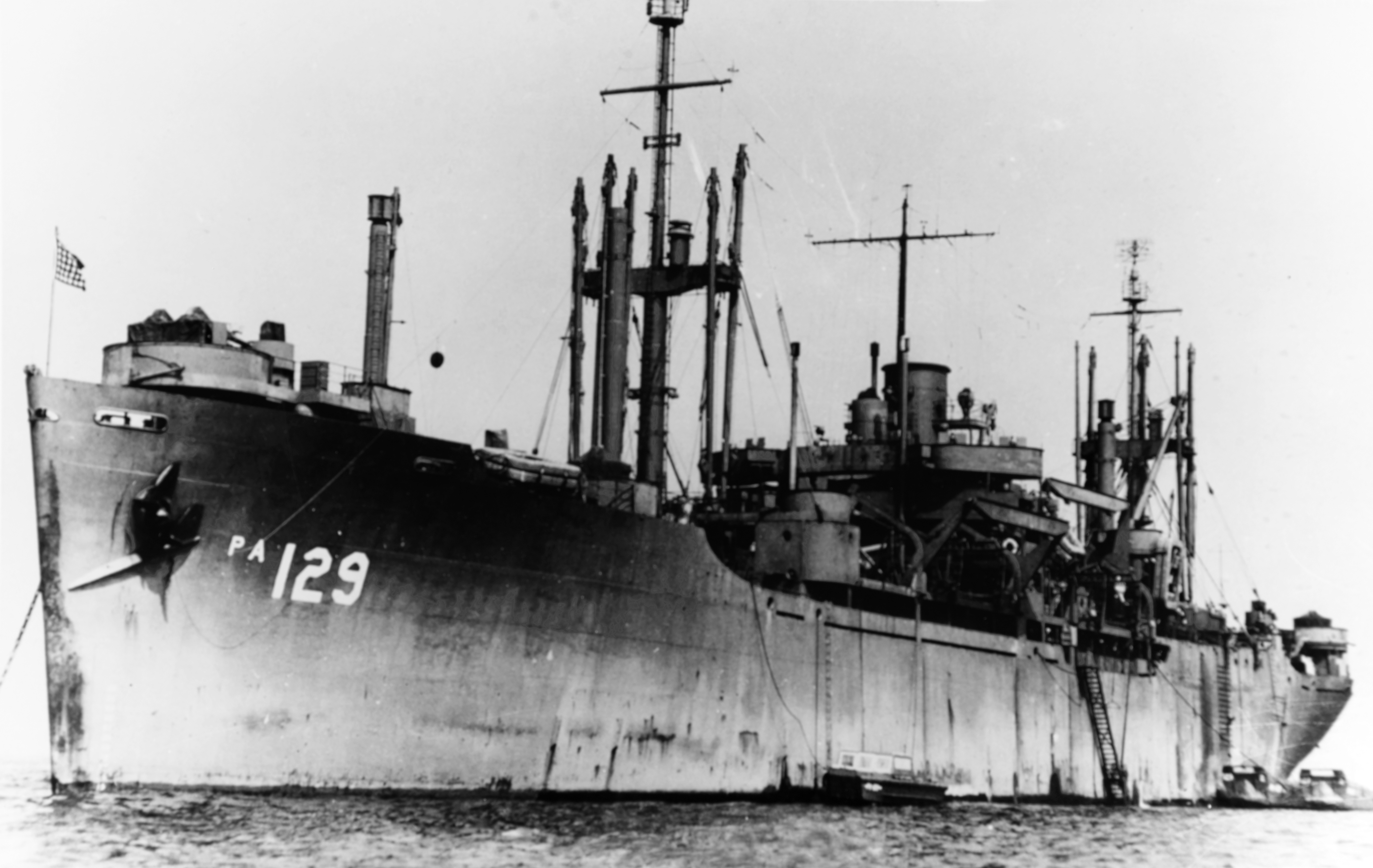
USS Marvin H. McIntyre

Arlington was built by California Shipbuilding Corporation. Her keel was laid down as Arlington on 25 May 1944. She was launched on 21 September and delivered as Marvin H. McIntyre on 18 August. Built for the United States Navy. To the USMC in 1946. Laid up in the James River. She was sold to New York shipbreakers in April 1973.

== Asbury Victory ==
Asbury Victory was built by Permanente Metals Corporation. Her keel was laid on 6 May 1945. She was launched on 16 June and delivered on 18 July. Built for the WSA, she was operated under the management of American-Hawaiian Steamship Company. Laid up in the James River in 1947. She was returned to service during the Korean War, then laid up again before being returned to service during the Vietnam War. Laid up in the James River in 1969, later transferred to Beaumont. She was scrapped at Alang in 1993.

== Atchison Victory ==
Atchison Victory was built by California Shipbuilding Corporation. Her keel was laid on 17 February 1944. She was launched on 22 April and delivered on 8 June. Built for the WSA, she was operated under the management of American President Lines. Sold in 1946 to Renfrew Navigation Co. Operated under the management of Furness, Withy & Co. Sold in 1947 to Khedivial Mail Line, Alexandria, Egypt and renamed Mohamed Ali El Kebir. Converted to carry passengers. To United Arab Maritime Company in 1960 and renamed Salah El Din. She caught fire at Hamilton, Canada on 4 September 1963 and was severely damaged. Sold in 1964 to Salvador Investment Co., Monrovia, Liberia and renamed Mercantile Victory. Repaired at Houston, she departed for Basrah, Iraq on 21 March 1964. She caught fire in the Red Sea (23°57′N 36°30′E) on 23 April and was towed into Suez, Egypt. She departed under tow of the tug Vortice on 8 September, arriving at Khorramshahr, Iran on 23 September. Not allowed to enter port, she departed under tow in early November, arriving at Marseille, France in late December. She was laid up unrepaired. Sold in April 1965, she arrived at Castellón de la Plana, Spain for scrapping in May.

== Atlantic City Victory ==
Atlantic City Victory was built by Bethlehem Fairfield Shipyard. Her keel was laid on 25 July 1945. She was launched on 19 September and delivered on 18 October. Built for the WSA, she was operated under the management of American Export Line. Sold in 1947 to Panama Shipping Co., Panama and renamed Vianna. Operated under the management of Lamport & Holt. Sold in 1949 to Compagnie Royale Belgo-Argentine, Antwerp, Belgium and renamed Flandres. She collided with the Park ship Trader in the English Channel 4 nautical miles (7.4 km) south of the East Goodwin Lightship on 16 October 1957. Sold in 1961 to Armament Deppe S.A., Antwerp. Sold in 1962 to China Union Lines, Keelung, Taiwan and renamed Taipei Victory. She was scrapped in Taiwan in 1974.

== Attala ==
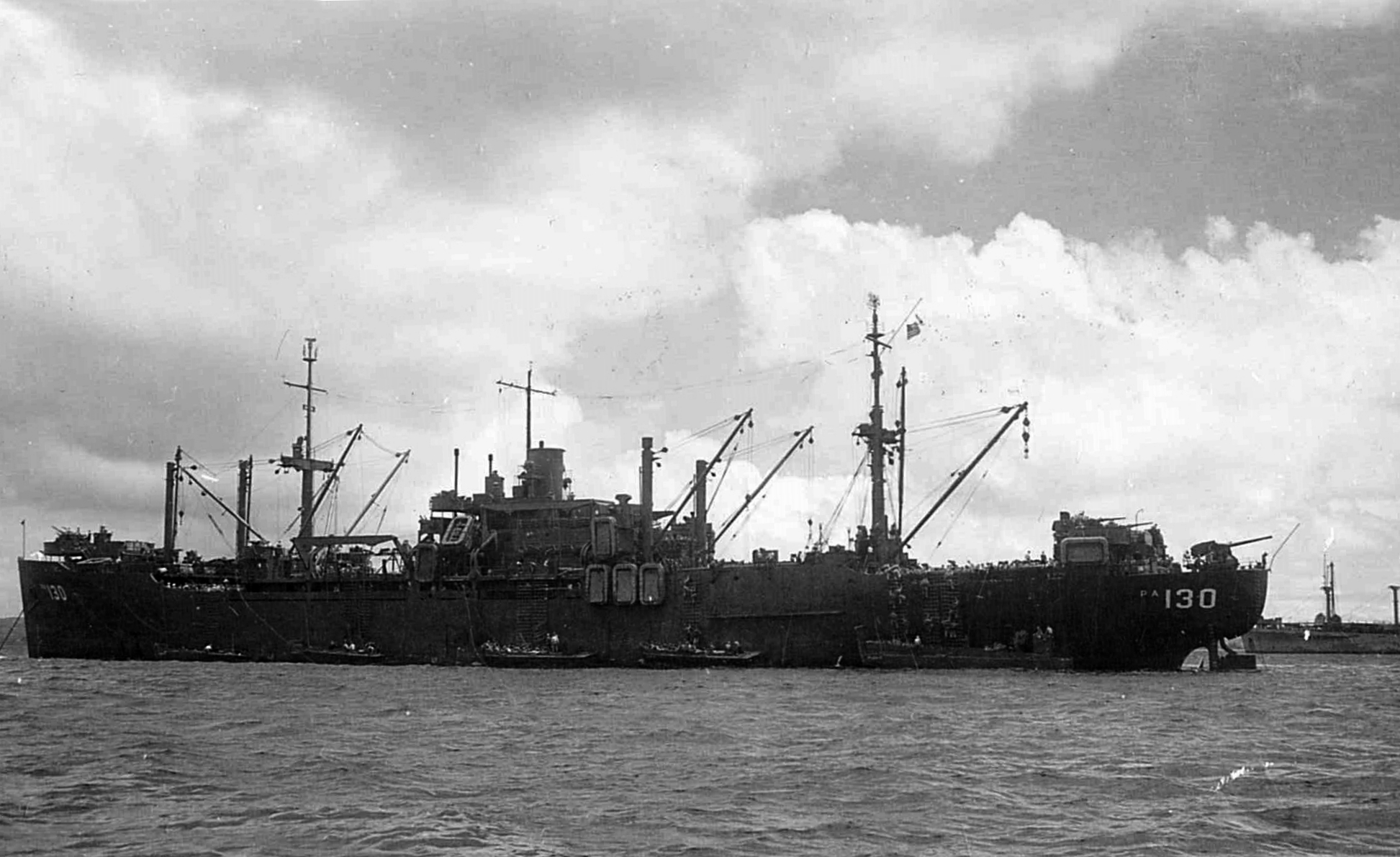
USS Attala

Attala was built by California Shipbuilding Corporation. Her keel was laid on 18 July 1944. She was launched on 27 September and delivered on 30 November. Built for the United States Navy. To the USMC in 1946, laid up in the James River. She was scrapped at Castellón de la Plana in 1974.

== Attleboro Victory ==
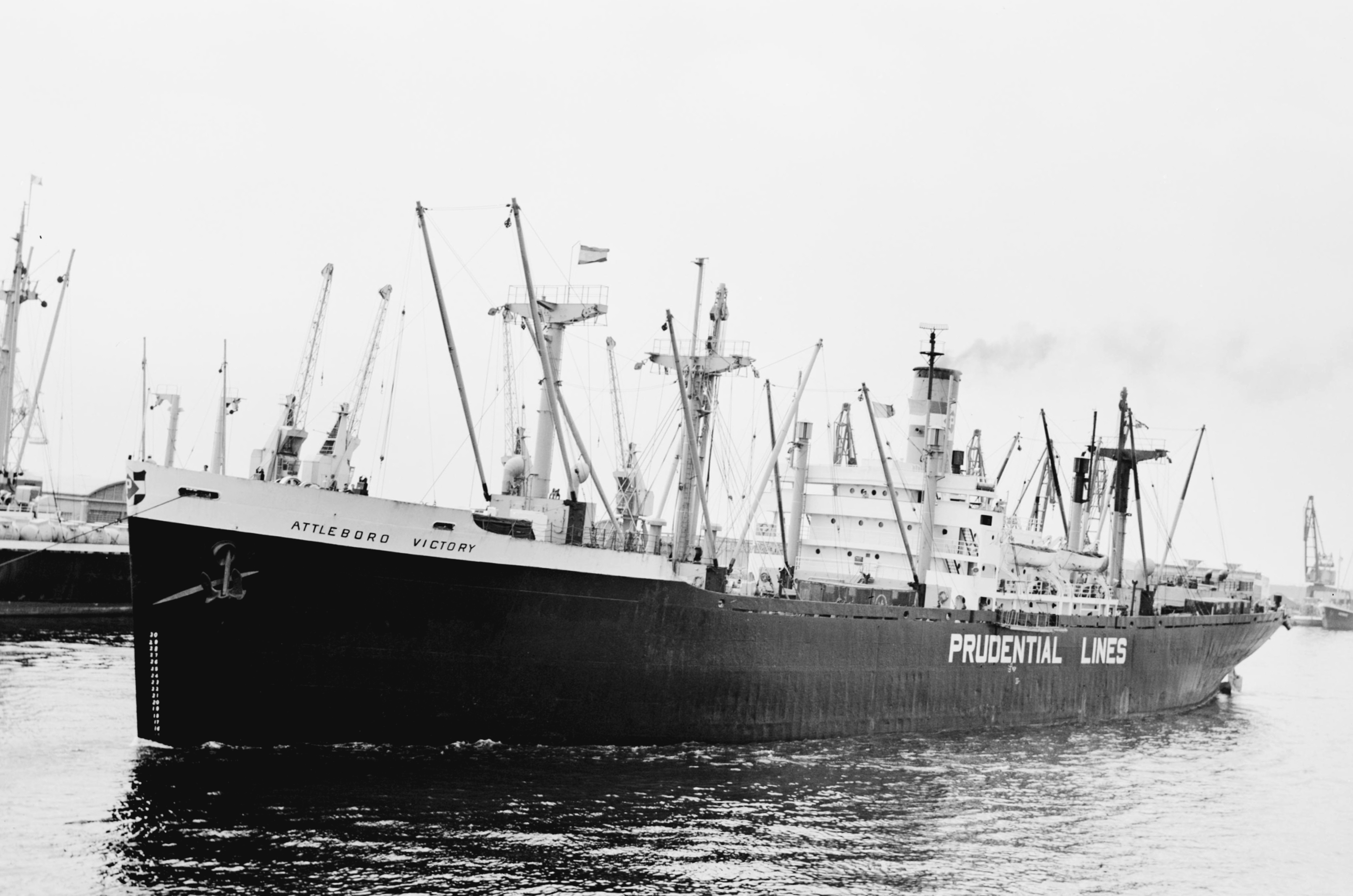
Attleboro Victory

Attleboro Victory was built by Bethlehem Fairfield Shipyard. Her keel was laid on 6 January 1945. She was launched on 16 March and delivered on 10 April. Built for the WSA, she was operated under the management of Stockard Steamship Company. Sold in 1948 to United States Lines and renamed American Attorney. Sold in 1956 to Transyork Shipping Corp., New York and renamed Transyork. Sold in 1957 to Compania Navigation Continental, Liberia. Sold in 1959 to Prudential Steamship Corporation, New York and renamed Attleboro Victory. Sold in 1968 to United States Department of Commerce, leased back to her former owners. Laid up in the James River in 1970, she was scrapped at Brownsville in 1976.

== Audubon ==
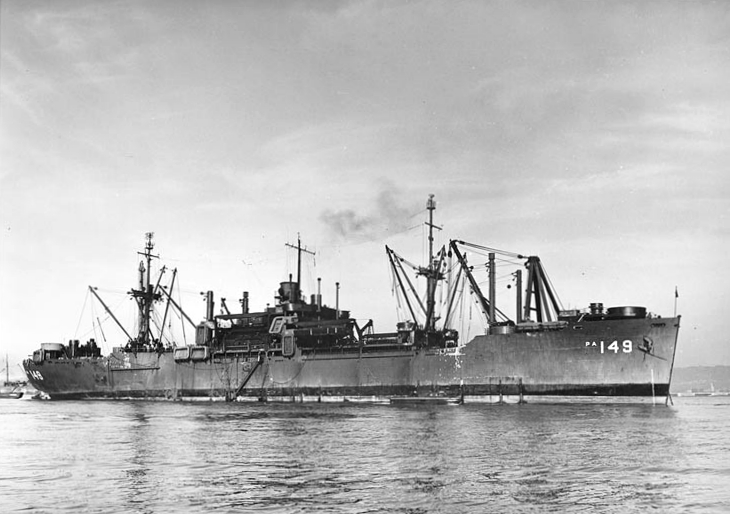
USS Audubon

Audubon was built by Kaiser Company, Vancouver, Washington. She was delivered on 20 December 1944. Built for the United States Navy. To the USMC in 1946 and laid up in the James River. She was scrapped at New York in 1973.

== Augustana Victory ==
Augustana Victory was built by Permanente Metals Corporation. Her keel was laid on 5 April 1945. She was launched on 16 May and delivered on 9 June. Built for the WSA, she was operated under the management of Interocean Steamship Co. Sold in 1948 to United States Lines and renamed American Lawyer. Sold in 1956 to American Union Transport Inc., New York and renamed Transcaribbean. She ran aground on Cabras Island, off San Juan, Puerto Rico on 1 May 1963 whilst on a voyage from New York to Bermuda. Salvage was abandoned after she was further damaged by weather and she was declared a constructive total loss.

== Australia Victory ==
Australia Victory was built by Permanente Metals Corporation. Her keel was laid on 17 January 1944. She was launched on 29 April and delivered on 28 June. Built for the WSA, she was operated under the management of Matson Navigation Company. Sold in 1947 to Moore-McCormack Lines and renamed Mormacoak. Sold in 1969 to T. J. Stevenson & Co., New York and renamed Oak. She was scrapped at Kaohsiung in February 1970.
