= SS New Bern Victory =

Victory ship of the United States

- Typical Victory Ship.

History

United States
- Name: SS New Bern Victory
- Namesake: City of New Bern, North Carolina
- Owner: War Shipping Administration
- Operator: Prudential Steamship Corporation
- Builder: Bethlehem-Fairfield Shipyard, Baltimore
- Laid down: January 15, 1945
- Launched: March 8, 1945
- Completed: March 31, 1945
- Fate: Sank on July 4, 1972 in heavy weather off Karachi.

General characteristics
- Class & type: VC2-S-AP3 Victory ship
- Tonnage: 7612 GRT, 4,553 NRT
- Displacement: 15,200 tons
- Length: 455 ft (139 m)
- Beam: 62 ft (19 m)
- Draft: 28 ft (8.5 m)
- Installed power: 8,500 shp (6,300 kW)
- Propulsion: HP & LP turbines geared to a single 20.5-foot (6.2 m) propeller
- Speed: 16.5 knots
- Boats & landing craft carried: 4 Lifeboats
- Complement: 62 Merchant Marine and 28 US Naval Armed Guards
- Armament: 1 × 5 inch (127 mm)/38 caliber gun; 1 × 3 inch (76 mm)/50 caliber gun; 8 × 20 mm Oerlikon

SS New Bern Victory was a cargo Victory ship built during World War II under the Emergency Shipbuilding program. The New Bern Victory (MCV-639) was a type VC2-S-AP2 Victory ship built by Bethlehem-Fairfield Shipyards. The Maritime Administration cargo ship was the 639 ship built. Her keel was laid on January 15, 1945. She was launched on March 8, 1945 and completed on March 31, 1945. The 10,600-ton ship was constructed for the Maritime Commission. The American Export Line and later the Isthmian Steamship Company operated her under the United States Merchant Marine act for the War Shipping Administration. Named for the city of New Bern, North Carolina.

Victory ships were designed to supersede the earlier Liberty Ships. Unlike Liberty ships, Victory ships were designed to serve the US Navy after the war and also last longer. The Victory ship differed from a Liberty ship in that they were: faster, longer and wider, taller, and had a thinner stack set farther toward the superstructure. They also had a long raised forecastle.

== World War II ==
Completed on March 31, 1945 the New Bern Victory did not operate during active World War II operations, as the surrender of Imperial Japan was announced on August 15, 1945. She was operated by the Prudential Steamship Corporation as a troop transport as part of Operation Magic Carpet. The New Bern Victory along with 96 other Victory ships, were converted to troopships to bring the US soldiers home as part of Operation Magic Carpet. She departed the so-called Cigarette Camps in Europe to bring troops home. On 4 June 1945 the New Bern Victory was damaged by a mine as she steamed from the Mediterranean Sea to the Black Sea. She was repaired and put back in service. One of her troop trips was from Leghorn, Italy to New York in August of 1946.

== Commercial service ==
In 1947 she was one of three Victory ships sold from the United States Marine Corps to South African Marine Corporation in Cape Town, the other two ships were the Westbrook Victory and Westerly Victory. The three cargo ships had accommodation for 12 passengers added and were renamed. The New Bern Victory became Constantia. She steamed from New York in August 1947 to the first run of her new South African cargo liner service. In 1961 she was renamed the South African Vanguard, modified to S. A. Vanguard three years later. In 1969 she was sold to Fairwind Maritime Corporation in Panama and renamed the Isabena. On July 4th, 1972 while off Manora Point, Karachi, near Manora, Karachi, Pakistan she took on a heavy list in rough seas. She had load of 9400 tons of grain from the tanker Overseas Joyce. On 24 July she capsized and sank in shallow water. Later she was hit by a passing ship, that ship was severely damaged.

== See also ==
- List of Victory ships
- Liberty ship
- Type C1 ship
- Type C2 ship
- Type C3 ship

== Sources ==
- Sawyer, L.A. and W.H. Mitchell. Victory ships and tankers: The history of the ‘Victory’ type cargo ships and the tankers built in the United States of America during World War II, Cornell Maritime Press, 1974, 0-87033-182-5.
- United States Maritime Commission:
- Victory Cargo Ships
