= SS Edgar E. Clark =

American Liberty ship

History

United States
- Name: Edgar E. Clark
- Namesake: Edgar E. Clark
- Owner: War Shipping Administration (WSA)
- Operator: Stockard Steamship Corp.
- Ordered: as type (Z-EC2-S-C2) hull, MC hull 1541
- Builder: J.A. Jones Construction, Panama City, Florida
- Cost: $1,500,565
- Yard number: 23
- Way number: 5
- Laid down: 25 October 1943
- Launched: 11 December 1943
- Completed: 7 February 1944
- Identification: Call Signal: KUVQ
- Fate: Laid up in National Defense Reserve Fleet, James River Group, Lee Hall, Virginia, 11 October 1945; Transferred to the Commonwealth of Virginia, 24 March 1976; Sunk as artificial reef, 1977

General characteristics
- Class & type: type Z-EC2-S-C2, army tank transport
- Tonnage: 10,865 LT DWT; 7,176 GRT
- Displacement: 3,380 long tons (3,434 t) (light); 14,245 long tons (14,474 t) (max)
- Length: 441 feet 6 inches (135 m) oa; 416 feet (127 m) pp; 427 feet (130 m) lwl
- Beam: 57 feet (17 m)
- Draft: 27 ft 9.25 in (8.4646 m)
- Installed power: 2 × Oil fired 450 °F (232 °C) boilers, operating at 220 psi (1,500 kPa); 2,500 hp (1,900 kW)
- Propulsion: 1 × triple-expansion steam engine, (manufactured by General Machinery Corp., Hamilton, Ohio); 1 × screw propeller
- Speed: 11.5 knots (21.3 km/h; 13.2 mph)
- Capacity: 562,608 cubic feet (15,931 m^{3}) (grain); 499,573 cubic feet (14,146 m^{3}) (bale)
- Complement: 38–62 USMM; 21–40 USNAG
- Armament: Varied by ship; Bow-mounted 3-inch (76 mm)/50-caliber gun; Stern-mounted 4-inch (102 mm)/50-caliber gun; 2–8 × single 20-millimeter (0.79 in) Oerlikon anti-aircraft (AA) cannons and/or, 2–8 × 37-millimeter (1.46 in) M1 AA guns

SS Edgar E. Clark was a Liberty ship built in the United States during World War II. She was named after Edgar E. Clark, the chief executive of the Order of Railway Conductors, member of the Interstate Commerce Commission from 1906 to 1921, serving as its chairman from 1913 to 1914 and 1918 to 1921.

== Construction ==
Edgar E. Clark was laid down on 25 October 1943, under a United States Maritime Commission (MARCOM) contract, MC hull 1541, by J.A. Jones Construction, Panama City, Florida; she was launched on 11 November 1943.

== History ==
She was allocated to Stockard Steamship Corp., on 7 February 1944. On 8 October 1947, she was laid up in the National Defense Reserve Fleet, in the James River Group, Lee Hall, Virginia. On 24 March 1976, she was withdrawn from the fleet by the Commonwealth of Virginia, to be used as an artificial reef. She was sunk in 1977, off the Virginia Capes.

== Bibliography ==
- "Jones Construction, Panama City FL". ShipbuildingHistory.com. 13 October 2010.
- "Liberty Ships – World War II".
- Maritime Administration. "Edgar E. Clark". Ship History Database Vessel Status Card. U.S. Department of Transportation, Maritime Administration. Archived from the original on 12 December 2019.
- Davies, James (May 2004). "Specifications (As-Built)" (PDF). p. 23.
- "SS Edgar E. Clark".
