= SS Wendell L. Willkie =

Liberty ship of WWII

History

United States
- Name: Wendell L. Willkie
- Namesake: Wendell L. Willkie
- Owner: War Shipping Administration (WSA)
- Operator: Stockard Steamship Corp.
- Ordered: as type (EC2-S-C1) hull, MC hull 2333
- Builder: J.A. Jones Construction, Panama City, Florida
- Cost: $855,926
- Yard number: 74
- Way number: 1
- Laid down: 8 November 1944
- Launched: 9 December 1944
- Completed: 21 December 1944
- Identification: Call sign: ANBQ
- Fate: Placed in the National Defense Reserve Fleet, Mobile, Alabama, 26 July 1949; Returned to the National Defense Reserve Fleet, Mobile, Alabama, 17 March 1952; Removed from fleet, 18 January 1952; Sold for scrapping, 12 January 1970, withdrawn from fleet, 10 March 1970

General characteristics
- Class & type: Liberty ship; type EC2-S-C1, standard
- Tonnage: 10,865 LT DWT; 7,176 GRT
- Displacement: 3,380 long tons (3,434 t) (light); 14,245 long tons (14,474 t) (max)
- Length: 441 feet 6 inches (135 m) oa; 416 feet (127 m) pp; 427 feet (130 m) lwl
- Beam: 57 feet (17 m)
- Draft: 27 ft 9.25 in (8.4646 m)
- Installed power: 2 × Oil fired 450 °F (232 °C) boilers, operating at 220 psi (1,500 kPa); 2,500 hp (1,900 kW)
- Propulsion: 1 × triple-expansion steam engine, (manufactured by Filer and Stowell, Milwaukee, Wisconsin); 1 × screw propeller
- Speed: 11.5 knots (21.3 km/h; 13.2 mph)
- Capacity: 562,608 cubic feet (15,931 m^{3}) (grain); 499,573 cubic feet (14,146 m^{3}) (bale)
- Complement: 38–62 USMM; 21–40 USNAG
- Armament: Varied by ship; Bow-mounted 3-inch (76 mm)/50-caliber gun; Stern-mounted 4-inch (102 mm)/50-caliber gun; 2–8 × single 20-millimeter (0.79 in) Oerlikon anti-aircraft (AA) cannons and/or, 2–8 × 37-millimeter (1.46 in) M1 AA guns

SS Wendell L. Willkie was a Liberty ship built in the United States during World War II. She was named after Wendell L. Willkie, an American lawyer, corporate executive, and the 1940 Republican nominee for President.

== Construction ==
Wendell L. Willkie was laid down on 8 November 1944, under a Maritime Commission (MARCOM) contract, MC hull 2333, by J.A. Jones Construction, Panama City, Florida; and launched on 9 December 1944.

== History ==
She was allocated to the Stockard Steamship Corp., 21 December 1944. On 26 July 1949, she was placed in the National Defense Reserve Fleet, Mobile, Alabama.

After a return to service 18 January 1952, she was returned to the Mobile Reserve Fleet, 17 March 1952. She was sold for scrapping, 12 January 1970, to Pinto Island Metals Co., for $44,000. She was withdrawn from the fleet, 10 March 1970.

== Bibliography ==
- "Jones Construction, Panama City FL". www.ShipbuildingHistory.com. 13 October 2010.
- Maritime Administration. "Wendell L. Willkie". Ship History Database Vessel Status Card. U.S. Department of Transportation, Maritime Administration. This article incorporates text from this source, which is in the public domain.
- Davies, James (May 2004). "Specifications (As-Built)" (PDF). p. 23.
- "SS Wendell L. Willkie".
