= Ivar An Christensen =

Norwegian ship owner

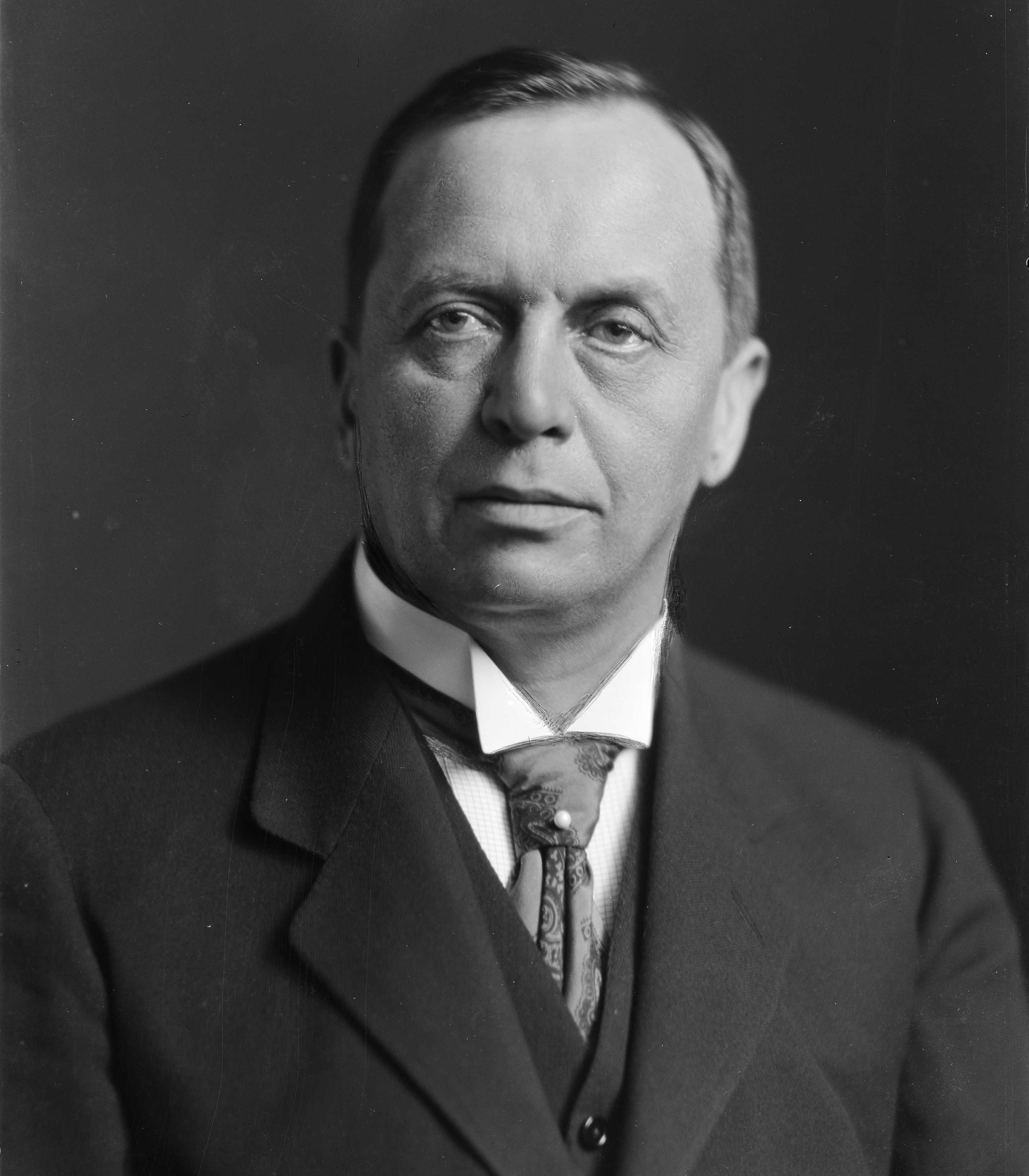
- Born: 29 June 1868; Mandal, Norway
- Died: 17 January 1934 (aged 65); Zürich, Switzerland
- Occupation: Ship owner

Ivar An Christensen (29 June 1868 – 17 January 1934) was a Norwegian ship owner.

== Biography ==
Christensen was born at Mandal in Lister og Mandal county, Norway. He was the son of Edmund Harris Christensen and Margrethe Rummelhoff. He first established himself as a ship broker at Haugesund in 1893. By 1912 he was the largest ship owner in Haugesund, with a fleet of eleven steam ships.

In 1912, he married Emmy Holter-Sørensen (1889-1970), daughter of wholesaler Peder Holter-Sørensen. The couple established residence at Frederik Stangs gate 22-24 Kristiania (now Oslo). Their residence was designed by architect Arnstein Arneberg and now houses offices of Nordic Choice Hotels.

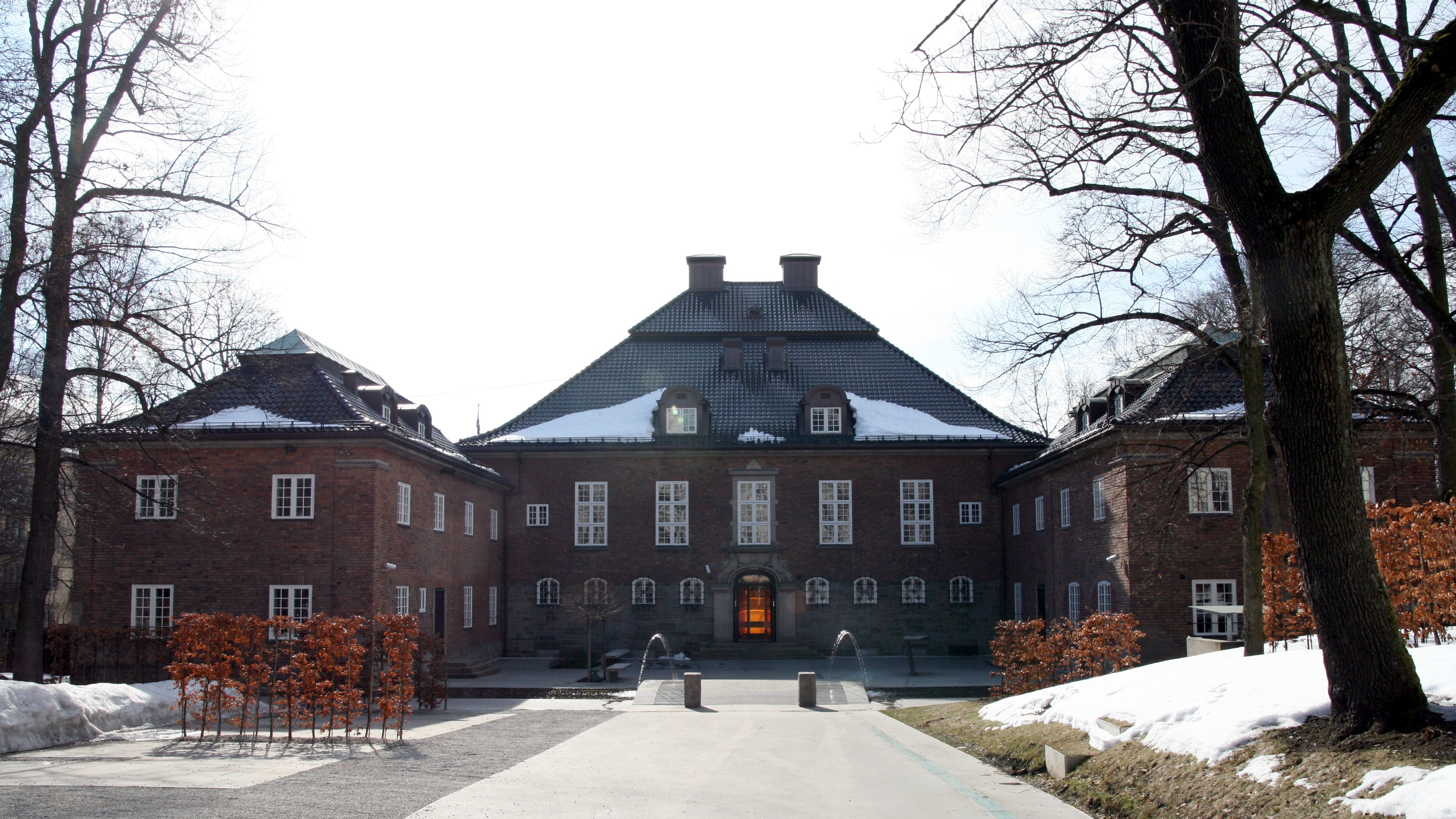
Frederik Stangs gate 22-24

Christensen was a central person in Norwegian shipping. In 1920 three of his companies were merged to form Ivarans Rederi. Christensen was the first chairman of the Norwegian Automobile Federation, and was among the largest financial supporters of the establishment of Det Nye Teater.
