= SS W. S. Jennings =

Liberty ship of WWII

History

United States
- Name: W. S. Jennings
- Namesake: W. S. Jennings
- Owner: War Shipping Administration (WSA)
- Operator: Stockard Steamship Corp.
- Ordered: as type (EC2-S-C1) hull, MC hull 2487
- Awarded: 23 April 1943
- Builder: St. Johns River Shipbuilding Company, Jacksonville, Florida
- Cost: $992,949
- Yard number: 51
- Way number: 3
- Laid down: 9 June 1944
- Launched: 25 July 1944
- Completed: 9 August 1944
- Identification: Call sign: WRRK
- Fate: Laid up in the National Defense Reserve Fleet, Mobile, Alabama, 15 December 1949; Laid up in the James River Reserve Fleet, Lee Hall, Virginia, 28 April 1952; Sold for scrapping, 27 February 1970, withdrawn from fleet, 1 May 1970

General characteristics
- Class & type: Liberty ship; type EC2-S-C1, standard
- Tonnage: 10,865 LT DWT; 7,176 GRT
- Displacement: 3,380 long tons (3,434 t) (light); 14,245 long tons (14,474 t) (max)
- Length: 441 feet 6 inches (135 m) oa; 416 feet (127 m) pp; 427 feet (130 m) lwl
- Beam: 57 feet (17 m)
- Draft: 27 ft 9.25 in (8.4646 m)
- Installed power: 2 × Oil fired 450 °F (232 °C) boilers, operating at 220 psi (1,500 kPa); 2,500 hp (1,900 kW)
- Propulsion: 1 × triple-expansion steam engine, (manufactured by General Machinery Corp., Hamilton, Ohio); 1 × screw propeller
- Speed: 11.5 knots (21.3 km/h; 13.2 mph)
- Capacity: 562,608 cubic feet (15,931 m^{3}) (grain); 499,573 cubic feet (14,146 m^{3}) (bale)
- Complement: 38–62 USMM; 21–40 USNAG
- Armament: Varied by ship; Bow-mounted 3-inch (76 mm)/50-caliber gun; Stern-mounted 4-inch (102 mm)/50-caliber gun; 2–8 × single 20-millimeter (0.79 in) Oerlikon anti-aircraft (AA) cannons and/or, 2–8 × 37-millimeter (1.46 in) M1 AA guns

SS W. S. Jennings was a Liberty ship built in the United States during World War II. She was named after W. S. Jennings, an American politician. He served as the 18th Governor of Florida after being a lawyer, county judge, and state representative.

== Construction ==
W. S. Jennings was laid down on 9 June 1944, under a Maritime Commission (MARCOM) contract, MC hull 2487, by the St. Johns River Shipbuilding Company, Jacksonville, Florida; and was launched on 25 July 1944.

== History ==
She was allocated to the Stockard Steamship Corp., on 9 August 1944. On 15 December 1949, she was laid up in the National Defense Reserve Fleet, Mobile, Alabama. On 28 April 1952, she was laid up in the James River Reserve Fleet, Lee Hall, Virginia. On 1 July 1953, she was withdrawn from the fleet to be loaded with grain under the "Grain Program 1953", she returned loaded on 17 July 1953. On 17 June 1957, she was withdrawn to be unload, she returned on empty 27 June 1957. On 30 June 1958, she was withdrawn from the fleet to be loaded with grain under the "Grain Program 1958", she returned loaded on 8 July 1958. On 17 December 1959, she was withdrawn to be unload, she returned on empty 30 December 1959. On 17 July 1961, she was withdrawn from the fleet to be loaded with grain under the "Grain Program 1961", she returned loaded on 31 July 1961. On 17 January 1964, she was withdrawn to be unload, she returned on empty 30 January 1964. She was sold for scrapping, 27 February 1970, to S.P.A. Cantieri Navali, for $117,625. She was removed from the fleet, 1 May 1970.

== Bibliography ==
- "St. John's River Shipbuilding, Jacksonville FL". www.ShipbuildingHistory.com. 16 October 2010.
- Maritime Administration. "W. S. Jennings". Ship History Database Vessel Status Card. U.S. Department of Transportation, Maritime Administration.
- Davies, James (May 2004). "Specifications (As-Built)" (PDF). p. 23.
- "SS W. S. Jennings".
