= Fulham Power Station =

Former coal-fired power station in England

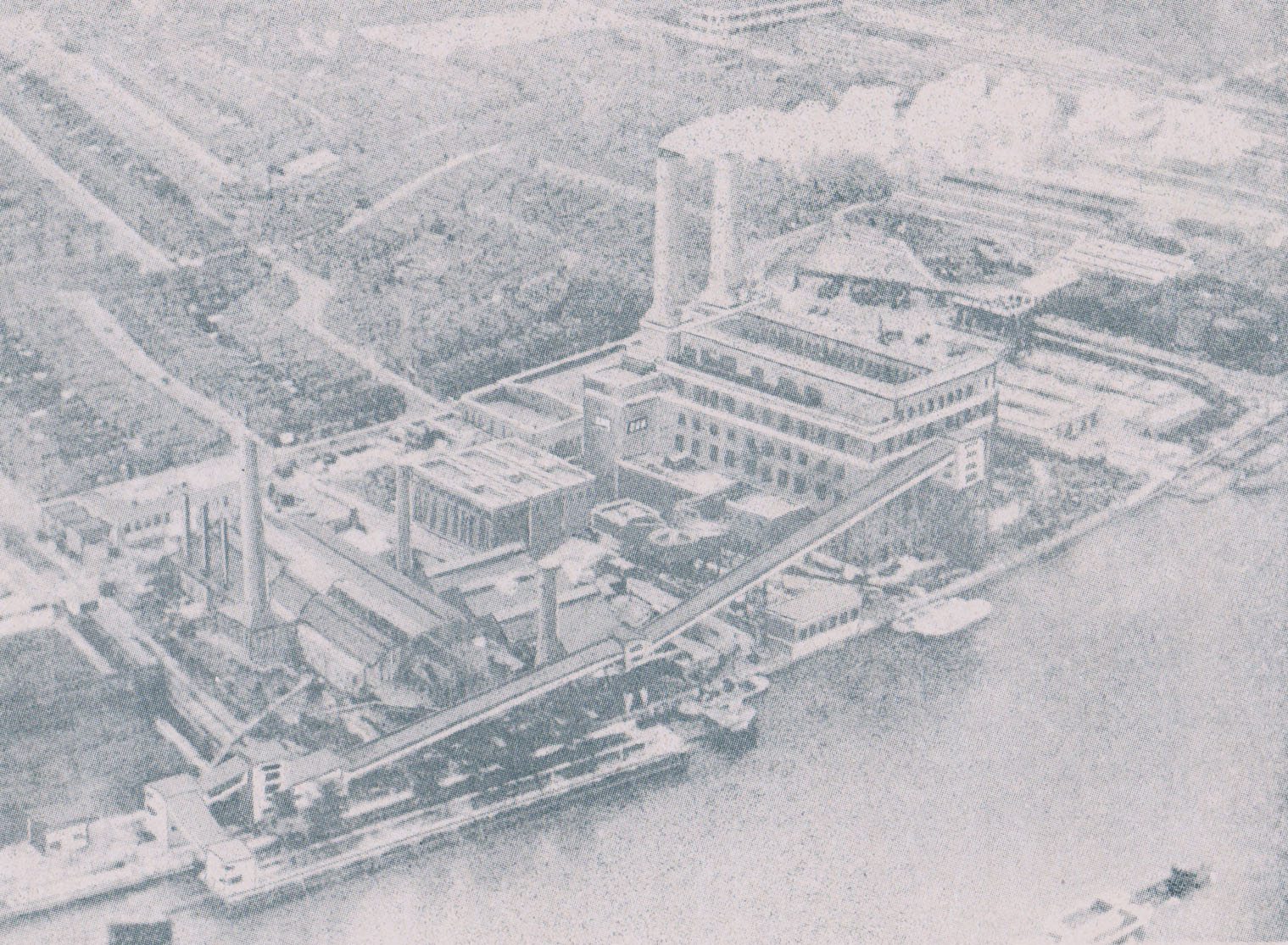
- Fulham Power Station in the 1930s
- Official name: Fulham A & B Power Stations
- Country: England
- Location: London Borough of Hammersmith and Fulham
- Coordinates: 51.470°N 0.183°W
- Status: Decommissioned and demolished
- Commission date: 1901
- Decommission date: 1978
- Owner: As Operator
- Operators: Fulham Borough Council (1901–1948); British Electricity Authority (1948–1955); Central Electricity Authority (1955–1957); Central Electricity Generating Board (1957–1978)

Thermal power station
- Primary fuel: Coal
- Site area: 50 hectare
- Chimneys: 4
- Cooling towers: None
- Cooling source: River water

Power generation
- Units operational: 6 × 60 MW
- Units decommissioned: All
- Nameplate capacity: 310 MW
- Annual net output: See text

External links
- Commons: Related media on Commons

Fulham Power Station was a coal-fired power station on the north bank of the River Thames at Battersea Reach in Fulham, London

Station A ran from 1901, with station B opening in 1936, until their decommissioning in 1978.

== History ==
=== Fulham A ===
The original power station was first commissioned in May 1901 by Fulham Borough Council. The initial station was multi fired by local refuse and coal powering six Babcock and Wilcox boilers. These powered 3 x Musgrave "Corliss" 450 BHP engines drive 3 x General Electric Company 2 phase, 2,800 Volt 300 kW alternators. By 1907 a Bellis & Morcom driving a 1,000 kW 2 phase alternator and a 750 kW Curtis turbine had been added. Steam for these was provided from four Stirling water-tube boilers each with an evaporative capacity of 15,000 Ib. per hour.

In 1925 the station was expanded with the installation of 2 x Metropolitan Vickers 6,000 kW 6,600 Volts 50 Hz turbo alternator sets. These were powered by steam from three Vickers boilers rated at a normal evaporation of 40,000 lb. per hour, 275 lb. per sq. in.

The generating capacity, maximum load, and electricity generated and sold was as follows:

Fulham A & B generating capacity, load and electricity produced and sold, 1903–36
Year	Generating capacity, MW	Maximum load, MW	Electricity generated, GWh	Electricity sold, GWh
1903/4	1.5	0.80	1.91	1.24
1912/3	4.45	2.170	4.945	4.186
1918/9	6.850	4.850	16.515	13.574
1919/20	6.850	3.750	9.382	8.367
1923/4	6.100	5.900	12.161	12.392
1936/7	130.00	14.36	233.44	16.226

=== Fulham B ===
In 1930 there was an official inquiry into the building of the station. With a potential coal burn of upto 2,000 ton per day there was concern at the level of grit and sulphur emissions in such an urban area. The Electrical Commissioners gave consent in early 1931 and the site began to be cleared of houses and workshops. Even then it was not until 1934 that the Council had been able to acquire enough land for the storage of nearly a month’s reserve of coal, a necessary adjunct to a base-load station.

Situated on a fifteen-acre site in Townmead Road, Fulham, adjacent to the Corporation’s existing power station, the new station has a river frontage of 1,310 ft. A reinforced-concrete coaling jetty, 360 ft. long, is capable of berthing two of the undertaking’s three sea-going colliers of 2,300 tons cargo capacity, either of which can be unloaded in 6 hours. The site could store upto 50,000 tons. Additionally there was an 800 ton bunker serving each pair of boilers.

The station was designed to have an output capacity of at least 310 megawatts (MW), the largest of any municipally owned station in the UK. It was designed by G.E. Baker and Preece, Cardew and Rider, and engineered by W.C. Parker. At opening it contained 2 x 60MW Metropolitan Vickers turbo alternators and a 10MW Brush-Ljiingstrom house set. These were fed with steam from six tri-drum Stirling boilers of 260,000 lb/hr.

The site was progressively expanded into the old A site and additional 60 MW sets were commissioned in 1937, 1941, 1946 with the final set in 1952 bringing capacity upto 360 MW. There were five 60 MW Metropolitan Vickers two cylinder impulse type turbines, they had 21 high pressure and 13 low pressure stages. There was also one 60 MW (11 kV) English Electric three cylinder 3,000 rpm turbo-alternator. There were 8 × Stirling 260,000 lb/hr (32.76 kg/s) and 8 × Stirling 315,000 lb/hr (39.69 kg/s) tri-drum high duty boilers. Steam conditions were 600 psi (41.4 bar) and 800 °F (427 °C). In 1948 it had the highest thermal efficiency of any power station in the UK. In 1954 it generated 1,792,929 GWh of electricity, had a thermal efficiency of 26.42 per cent, and burned 819,700 tons of coal. Fulham was one of the first stations to be fitted with flue-gas desulphurisation equipment. When Fulham was being developed in 1935 it was thought that it would be undesirable to discharge effluent into the Thames. The Laboratory of the Government Chemist argued that a closed cycle flue-gas treatment system would be possible. A process pioneered by James Howden and Company Ltd and ICI Fertilizers and Synthetic Products Ltd was used. Sulphur compounds were removed from the flue-gases in scrubbers by a circulating chalk slurry. Sulphur compound were removed as a semi-solid sludge and clarified water was returned to the scrubbers. The sludge was disposed of at sea. This was operated on 120MW of capacity between 1936 and 1940, but later removed.

=== Collier fleet and war damage ===
The 'B' station had a 120-yard (110 m) coal wharf, served by its own fleet of flatiron colliers built by the Burntisland Shipbuilding Company of Fife, Scotland. Fulham Borough's ship colours were a grey hull and a grey funnel emblazoned with a black top. The black funnel top was emblazoned with a monogram of the letters "FBC".

The first three flatirons, of nearly 1,600 GRT each, were launched in 1935–37 as SS Fulham, Fulham II and Fulham III. They were joined by the 1,562 GRT sister ships SS Fulham IV and SS Fulham V launched in 1938 and 1939.

During the Second World War the station and its ships were targets for enemy action. On 9th September 1940 a Luftwaffe air raid in the London blitz damaged the power station and put it out of action for two months.No. 1 set was very severely damaged the other two sets were lesser affected. By extraordinary efforts on part of the station staff and the manufacturers No. 3 set was back on load after 2 months with No. 2 set was recommissioned after a three months and No. 1 set was back on load after nearly a year On 4 September 1940 a Kriegsmarine E-boat torpedoed and shelled Fulham V in the North Sea off Cromer. The collier sank but all 19 crew were rescued. On 19 February 1941 Fulham II was damaged by a mine off the mouth of the River Tyne. One crew member was killed and she was beached at Frenchman's Point near South Shields to save her from sinking. She was taken to Jarrow on 18 March and later returned to service.

The 1,552 GRT sister ships SS Fulham VI and SS Fulham VII were launched in November and December 1941. Both survived the war but Fulham VII did not have a long life. On 14 February 1946 she was off Beachy Head in the English Channel bringing coal from Barry in south Wales when she was sunk in a collision with a US Victory Ship, the 7,607 GRT SS Alfred Victory.

MV Fulham VIII and MV Fulham IX were sister ships launched in 1947 and 1948. They were motor ships, and at almost 1,750 GRT were considerably larger than the earlier coal-burners.

Fulham I and Fulham III were scrapped in 1958, followed by Fulham IV and Fulham VI in 1959 and Fulham II in 1960. Fulham VIII was scrapped in 1969 but Fulham IX was sold in 1970 to new owners in Piraeus, Greece, who renamed her Eleistria II. On 4 July 1978 she was damaged in a collision with the Cypriot coaster MV Lokma in the Gulf of Suez. She arrived in Suez on 7 July, where she was scrapped.

=== Nationalisation ===
In 1948 Britain's electricity supply industry was nationalised under the Electricity Act 1947 and Fulham Power Station became part of the British Electricity Authority. The BEA was succeeded by the Central Electricity Authority in 1954 and the Central Electricity Generating Board in 1957.

=== Operations ===
The maximum steam capacity of the station boilers was 4,160,000 lb/hr (524 kg/s). Steam pressure and temperature at the turbine stop valves was 600 psi (41.3 bar) and 426 °C.

Electricity output from Fulham power station over the period 1946-1978 was as follows.

Fulham annual electricity output GWh

=== Decommissioning and asbestos removal ===
The CEGB decommissioned the power station in 1978 and sold it for redevelopment. Early in the 1980s some of its buildings were demolished for redevelopment, and the remaining buildings were converted into a 20,000 square metres (220,000 sq ft) storage facility.

After the CEGB sold the power station, a private contractor removed and bagged about 1,000 tonnes of hazardous asbestos and dumped it at an approved site in west London. Residents living close to the power station formed two campaign groups to raise their concerns about the possible risk to public health.

Fulham Power Station was one of the first of a number of power stations that the CEGB was making redundant and selling for redevelopment at that time. On 28 July 1983 it was the focus of a House of Commons debate on the sale and demolition of redundant power stations.

Labour MP Tom Cox, who had worked for the CEGB and whose Tooting constituency was only about 1 mile (1.6 km) from the power station, called it a "A major health and environmental issue" and called the CEGB's actions "incompetent". Cox said the Local Government (Miscellaneous Provisions) Act 1982 required six weeks' notice before any asbestos removal, but the CEGB did not give local residents even a month's notice that it had sold the power station or that it was to be demolished.

Conservative MP Martin Stevens, whose Fulham constituency included the power station, told the House that the CEGB had not told the London Borough of Hammersmith and Fulham it had sold the power station and had no statutory obligation to do so. The borough had immediately started monitoring asbestos in the atmosphere. On one occasion asbestos removal had been ordered to stop when it exceeded safe limits, but the Health and Safety Executive had to give the order as borough environmental health officers had no statutory powers concerning asbestos. Stevens also noted that the borough, not the contractor, was paying the £20,000 per month cost of this monitoring, and to do so for a year would equate to 1% of the Borough's income from local rates.

The Parliamentary Under-Secretary of State for Employment, John Gummer, told the House that he gave the CEGB credit for saying

"We have been told by the citizens of Fulham and people throughout the country that they would feel more assured if we had full responsibility to control the removal of asbestos from power stations before selling them."

Gummer stated that the Control of Pollution Act 1974 (COPA) required asbestos to be double-bagged to minimise the risk of contamination or spillage, and that this was monitored. However, Martin Stevens intervened stating that the contractor had not double-bagged asbestos waste at Fulham, to which Gummer replied that it for the HSE to decide if one bag would suffice.

In the House of Commons the day after the debate Alf Dubs, Labour MP for the Battersea constituency just across the river from Fulham Power Station, asked Norman Tebbit, Secretary of State for Employment "what representations he has received about the dangers of asbestos caused by the demolition of Fulham power station". John Gummer replied for the Secretary of State

"The Health and Safety Executive is monitoring demolition work at Fulham and the Central Electricity Generating Board has announced that in future it will strip power stations of asbestos before sale."

The site was built and developed into the "Regent on the River" apartment complex in the late 1980s. The architecture of the buildings reflects that of the power station of which they replaced.

== Sources ==
- Talbot-Booth, E.C. (1942) [1936]. Ships and the Sea (Seventh ed.). London: Sampson Low, Marston & Co. Ltd. p. 762.

Preceded by Agecroft Power Station	Largest Power Station in the UK; 1936–1954	Succeeded by Barking Power Station
