= SS George R. Poole =

World War II Liberty ship of the United States

History

United States
- Name: George R. Poole
- Namesake: George R. Poole
- Ordered: as type (EC2-S-C1) hull, MC hull 2395
- Builder: J.A. Jones Construction, Brunswick, Georgia
- Cost: $845,276
- Yard number: 180
- Way number: 4
- Laid down: 7 December 1944
- Launched: 8 January 1945
- Sponsored by: Mrs. R.D. Strauchan
- Completed: 19 January 1945
- Identification: Call Signal: ANEW
- Fate: Laid up in the National Defense Reserve Fleet, James River Group, Lee Hall, Virginia, 7 January 1946; Sold for scrapping, 13 December 1957

General characteristics
- Class & type: Liberty ship; type EC2-S-C1, standard
- Tonnage: 10,865 LT DWT; 7,176 GRT
- Displacement: 3,380 long tons (3,434 t) (light); 14,245 long tons (14,474 t) (max)
- Length: 441 feet 6 inches (135 m) oa; 416 feet (127 m) pp; 427 feet (130 m) lwl
- Beam: 57 feet (17 m)
- Draft: 27 ft 9.25 in (8.4646 m)
- Installed power: 2 × Oil fired 450 °F (232 °C) boilers, operating at 220 psi (1,500 kPa); 2,500 hp (1,900 kW)
- Propulsion: 1 × triple-expansion steam engine, (manufactured by General Machinery Corp., Hamilton, Ohio); 1 × screw propeller
- Speed: 11.5 knots (21.3 km/h; 13.2 mph)
- Capacity: 562,608 cubic feet (15,931 m^{3}) (grain); 499,573 cubic feet (14,146 m^{3}) (bale)
- Complement: 38–62 USMM; 21–40 USNAG
- Armament: Varied by ship; Bow-mounted 3-inch (76 mm)/50-caliber gun; Stern-mounted 4-inch (102 mm)/50-caliber gun; 2–8 × single 20-millimeter (0.79 in) Oerlikon anti-aircraft (AA) cannons and/or, 2–8 × 37-millimeter (1.46 in) M1 AA guns

SS George R. Poole was a Liberty ship built in the United States during World War II. She was named after George R. Poole, who was lost at sea while he was the 1st assistant engineer on SS Gulfstar, that was torpedoed by German submarine U-155, 3 April 1943, off Florida.

== Construction ==
George R. Poole was laid down on 7 December 1944, under a United States Maritime Commission (MARCOM) contract, MC hull 2395, by J.A. Jones Construction, Brunswick, Georgia; she was sponsored by Mrs .R.D. Strauchan, and launched on 8 January 1945.

== History ==
She was allocated to the Stockard Steamship Corp., on 19 January 1945. On 7 January 1946, she was laid up in the National Defense Reserve Fleet, in the James River Group, Lee Hall, Virginia. On 13 December 1957, she was sold for $88,668, to Boston Metals Co., for scrapping. She was removed from the fleet on 25 February 1958.

== Bibliography ==
- "Jones Construction, Brunswick GA". ShipbuildingHistory.com. 13 October 2010.
- "Liberty Ships – World War II".
- Maritime Administration. "George R. Poole". Ship History Database Vessel Status Card. U.S. Department of Transportation, Maritime Administration. Archived from the original on 12 December 2019.
- Davies, James (May 2004). "Specifications (As-Built)" (PDF). p. 23.
- "SS George R. Poole".
