= USS Audubon =

Attack transport ship in United States Navy

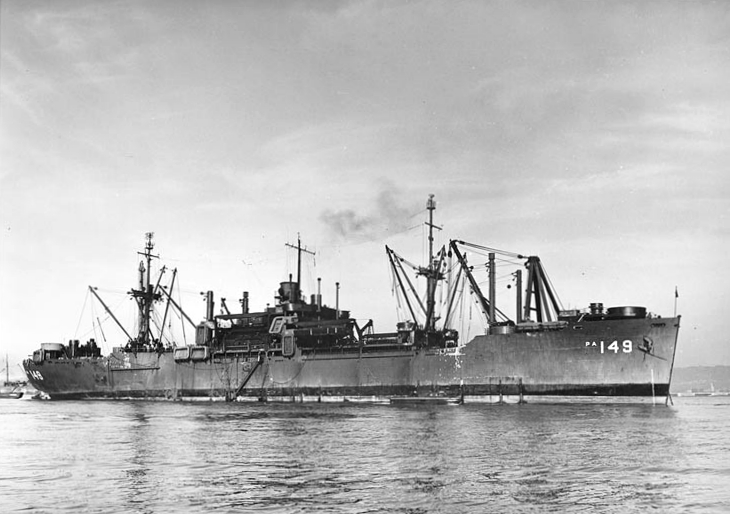

History

United States
- Name: USS Audubon
- Namesake: Audubon County, Iowa
- Ordered: as type VC2-S-AP5; MCV hull 814
- Laid down: 21 October 1944
- Launched: 3 December 1944
- Acquired: 19 December 1944
- Commissioned: 20 December 1944
- Decommissioned: 19 February 1946
- Stricken: 1946
- Fate: Scrapped, 9 April 1973

General characteristics
- Displacement: 12,450 tons (full load)
- Length: 455 ft 0 in (138.68 m)
- Beam: 62 ft 0 in (18.90 m)
- Draught: 24 ft 0 in (7.32 m)
- Speed: 19 knots
- Complement: 536
- Armament: one 5 in (130 mm) gun mount, twelve 40 mm gun mounts, ten 20 mm gun mounts

USS Audubon (APA-149) was a Haskell-class attack transport in service with the United States Navy from 1944 to 1946. She was scrapped in 1973.

== History ==
Audubon (MCV hull 814) was laid down on 21 October 1944 by the Kaiser Shipyards Co., Inc., Vancouver, Washington; launched on 3 December 1944; sponsored by Mrs. Fons Hughes; acquired by the Navy on 19 December 1944; designated APA-149; and commissioned on 20 December 1944.

=== World War II ===
Following shakedown at San Pedro, Los Angeles, the attack cargo ship sailed on 24 February for Pearl Harbor. Upon her arrival, her passengers disembarked, and she began loading more cargo. The attack transport got underway for Eniwetok on 29 March, reached that atoll on 6 April, and continued on to Ulithi on the 11th. There, Audubon took U.S. Army passengers and equipment on board and sailed for Okinawa. She anchored off Hagushi Beach on 26 April during the Battle of Okinawa and began discharging her passengers and cargo.

Audubon departed Okinawa on 30 April and headed for Saipan. After a brief stop there, the ship got underway for Hawaii. Having topped off her fuel and provisions at Pearl Harbor, she sailed on to San Francisco, California, where she arrived on 22 May. The ship was next ordered to Leyte, the Philippines. She made intermediate stops at Pearl Harbor, Eniwetok, and Ulithi before reaching Leyte on 30 June. On 9 July, the ship proceeded to Guadalcanal to transport Army troops to the Philippines. Following a fuel stop at Hollandia, New Guinea, on 17 July, she arrived at Leyte on 26 July. After disembarking most of her passengers, the ship moved on to Cebu on 29 July and the remaining contingent left the ship. Audubon paused at Samar on 2 August, then got underway to return to the United States.

At the time of the Japanese capitulation, Audubon was in the vicinity of Pearl Harbor. The transport pulled into San Francisco on 19 August and began a period of voyage repairs. Upon their completion, Audubon joined Operation Magic Carpet and sailed on 31 August, headed for the Philippines. She arrived at Leyte on 18 September, then shifted to Samar on the 20th. While at Samar, Audubon developed mechanical problems, which necessitated a period of drydocking. In early October, the ship was ordered back to California. On 22 October, she began an availability period at San Pedro, Los Angeles.

Audubon sailed once again for the Philippines on 11 November. After negotiating heavy seas, the attack transport arrived at Manila on 1 December. Thirty-six hours later, she sailed with almost 2,000 passengers embarked and reached San Francisco on 20 December.

Audubon began 1946 making preparations for a trip to Yokosuka, Japan. However, just before she was due to leave, her orders were cancelled, and she sailed on 11 January for the East Coast of the United States. She transited the Panama Canal on 20 January and reached Norfolk, Virginia, on 27 January 1946.

=== Decommissioning and fate ===
The ship was decommissioned on 19 February 1946, returned to the United States Maritime Commission on 13 March 1946, placed in the National Defense Reserve Fleet, and laid up in the James River, Virginia. She was sold on 9 April 1973 to the Union Minerals and Alloys Corporation, of New York City, and scrapped.

== Awards ==
Audubon earned one battle star for her World War II service.

=== Citations and campaign ribbons ===
American Campaign Medal
Asiatic–Pacific Campaign Medal
World War II Victory Medal
