= USNS Antioch =

1945 United States victory ship

History

United States
- Name: SS Alfred Victory
- Builder: Permanente Metals Yard No. 2, Richmond, California
- Laid down: 28 February 1945
- Launched: 11 April 1945
- In service: 7 May 1945
- Out of service: 1984
- Identification: IMO number: 5010725
- Fate: Scrapped, 1988

General characteristics
- Type: Type VC2-S-AP2 Victory ship
- Displacement: 4,512 long tons (4,584 t) light; 15,589 long tons (15,839 t) full load
- Length: 455 ft (139 m)
- Beam: 62 ft (19 m)
- Draft: 29 ft (8.8 m)
- Propulsion: Cross-compound steam turbine; 8,500 shp (6,338 kW); Single screw
- Speed: 15.5 knots (28.7 km/h; 17.8 mph)

USNS Antioch (T-AG-180) was the United States Navy name assigned to the United States Merchant Marine Victory Ship SS Alfred Victory. She was built in 1945 and had a tonnage of 7,607 GRT.

== World War II ==
During World War II the Alfred Victory was operated by the Hammond Shipping Company under charter with the Maritime Commission and War Shipping Administration. On February 14, 1946, Alfred Victory was off Beachy Head in the English Channel when she was involved in a collision with a British coastal collier, the 1,552 GRT SS Fulham VII, which then sank. In 1947 the Alfred Victory was placed in the James River, Reserve Fleet.

== Vietnam War ==
In 1965 she was removed from the Reserve fleet and activated for the Vietnam War as the USNS Antioch. Alfred Victory was one of 12 ships scheduled to be acquired by the United States Navy in February 1966 and converted into Forward Depot Ships for the Military Sea Transport Service. Alfred Victory (MCV-745) was chosen for this conversion and assigned the name USNS Antioch (T-AG-180), but the program was cancelled and the ships were not acquired by the Navy. From 1 July 1984, Alfred Victory was laid up in Suisun Bay, California, as part of the National Defense Reserve Fleet. In 1988 she was scrapped at Kaohsiung.
