= Prudential Steamship Corporation =

Former US Shipping Company

- Industry: Transportation and shipping
- Founded: 1933 in New York City
- Defunct: 1986 Chapter 11 bankruptcy
- Fate: Merged with Grace Lines in 1969
- Successor: Prudential Grace Line
- Key people: Stephan Stephanidis; Mr. Ewers (VP); Spyros P. Skouras; Barbara F. Skouras; Spyros S. Skouras; Plato A. Skouras

Prudential Steamship Corporation was a shipping company founded in 1933 in New York City by Stephan Stephanidis. Prudential Steamship Corporation operated the Prudential Lines. Prudential Lines main routes was from the United States to Mediterranean ports. The Prudential Lines was never successful and was always near bankruptcy. Prudential Lines was active in supporting the World War II efforts. At its peak in the 1960s, Prudential Lines owned and operated two tankers, and five cargo ships. In 1960, the Prudential Steamship Corporation was sold to Spyros Skouras and his family. In 1969, the Prudential Lines merged with Grace Lines, which continued to operate the fleet as the Prudential Grace Line.

== History ==
Stephan Stephanidis was born in Greece and immigrated to America. In 1933, he started the Prudential Steamship Corporation with one old cargo ship. Prudential Steamship Corporation operated US charter ships during World War II. Prudential Steamship Corporation made a number of management errors starting in the 1950s that kept it near bankruptcy. Fellow Greek, Spyros Skouras, loaned Stephanidis money to keep Prudential Steamship Corporation in operations. Spyros Skouras was a motion picture and film executive. He became the president of the 20th Century-Fox from 1942 to 1962. When Stephan Stephanidis died in 1960, Spyros S. Skouras became the owner of Prudential Steamship Corporation due to the large loan he had made to the firm. Spyros Solon Skouras's son, Spyros S. Skouras, became the head of Prudential Steamship Corporation. Spyros S. Skouras had founded Admiralty Enterprises, Inc. for ships owned by the family and as the management firm of the Prudential Lines. In late 1969, Grace Line was sold to the Prudential Lines for $44.5 million, with the merged company renamed Prudential Grace Line. Prudential Grace Line was sold to Delta Steamship Lines in 1978. Subsequently, Delta Steamship Lines was itself acquired and consolidated by Crowley Maritime in 1982. The sale did not end Prudential Steamship Corporation financial and management problems. In 1978, Plato A. Skouras took the family company to court, with claims for mismanagement, in Skouras v. Admiralty Enterprises, Inc. In 1981, Prudential Lines was near bankruptcy, and the United States Government gave the firm a 10-year $2.6 million loan. In 1981, to raise funds, Prudential Lines sold its South American shipping operations, of seven ships, for $75 million to Delta Steamship Lines, Inc. a subsidiary of Holiday Inns, Inc. In 1986, Prudential Lines went into involuntary Chapter 11 bankruptcy by three of its creditors. Asbestos-related claims also were added to the bankruptcy filing.

== Admiralty Enterprises, Inc. ==
Admiralty Enterprises, Inc. was a holding company that operated subsidiary companies. The subsidiary companies were World Wide Tankers, Inc., Prudential Lines, and Skouras Lines. In 1966 Admiralty Enterprises founded the SMC Shipping Corporation to aid the troubled Prudential Lines. SMC Shipping Corporation financed the order of five new ships, type Lighter Aboard Ship or LASH. World Wide Tankers, Inc. was founded on Jan. 13, 1949 in California.

- Some World Wide Tankers Inc - Skouras Lines ships:
- Saroula (Saroui), built in 1959 by Ingalls SB, was Exxon Seattle - Esso Seattle, acquired in 1981, scrapped in 1984. type T5-S-41a
- Barbara Jane, built in 1959 by Ingalls SB, became Baldbutte, scrapped 1984, type T5-S-41a
- John Goode, a Z-ET1-S-C3 Liberty ship Tanker built by California Shipbuilding Corp, owned 1948 to 1954

== World War II ==
Prudential Lines's fleet of ships were used to help the World War II effort. During World War II Prudential Lines operated Merchant navy ships for the United States Shipping Board. During World War II Prudential Lines was active with charter shipping with the Maritime Commission and War Shipping Administration. Prudential Lines operated Liberty ships for the merchant navy. The ship was run by its Prudential Lines crew and the US Navy supplied United States Navy Armed Guards to man the deck guns and radio.

== Ships ==
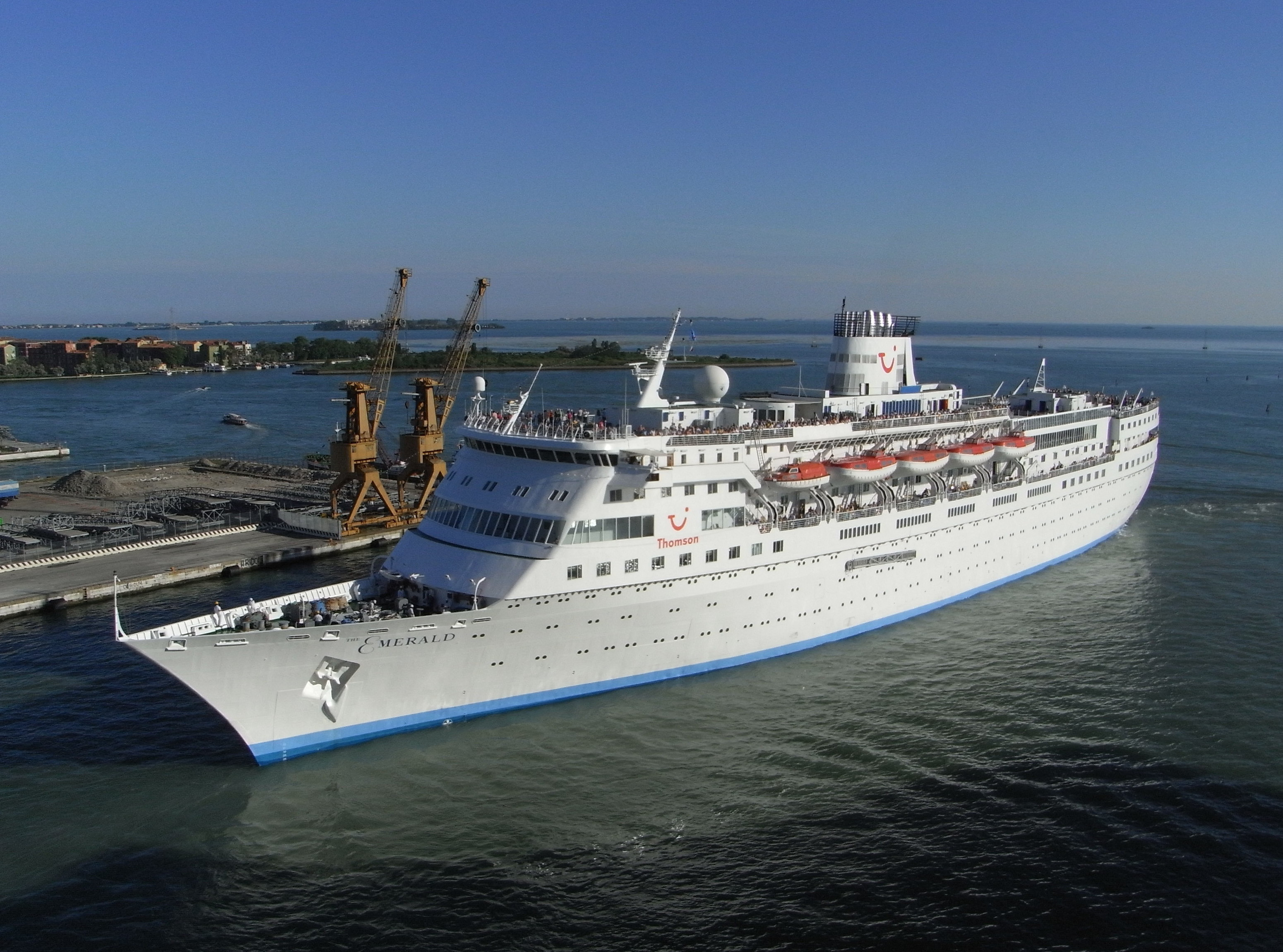
The Emerald in 2008

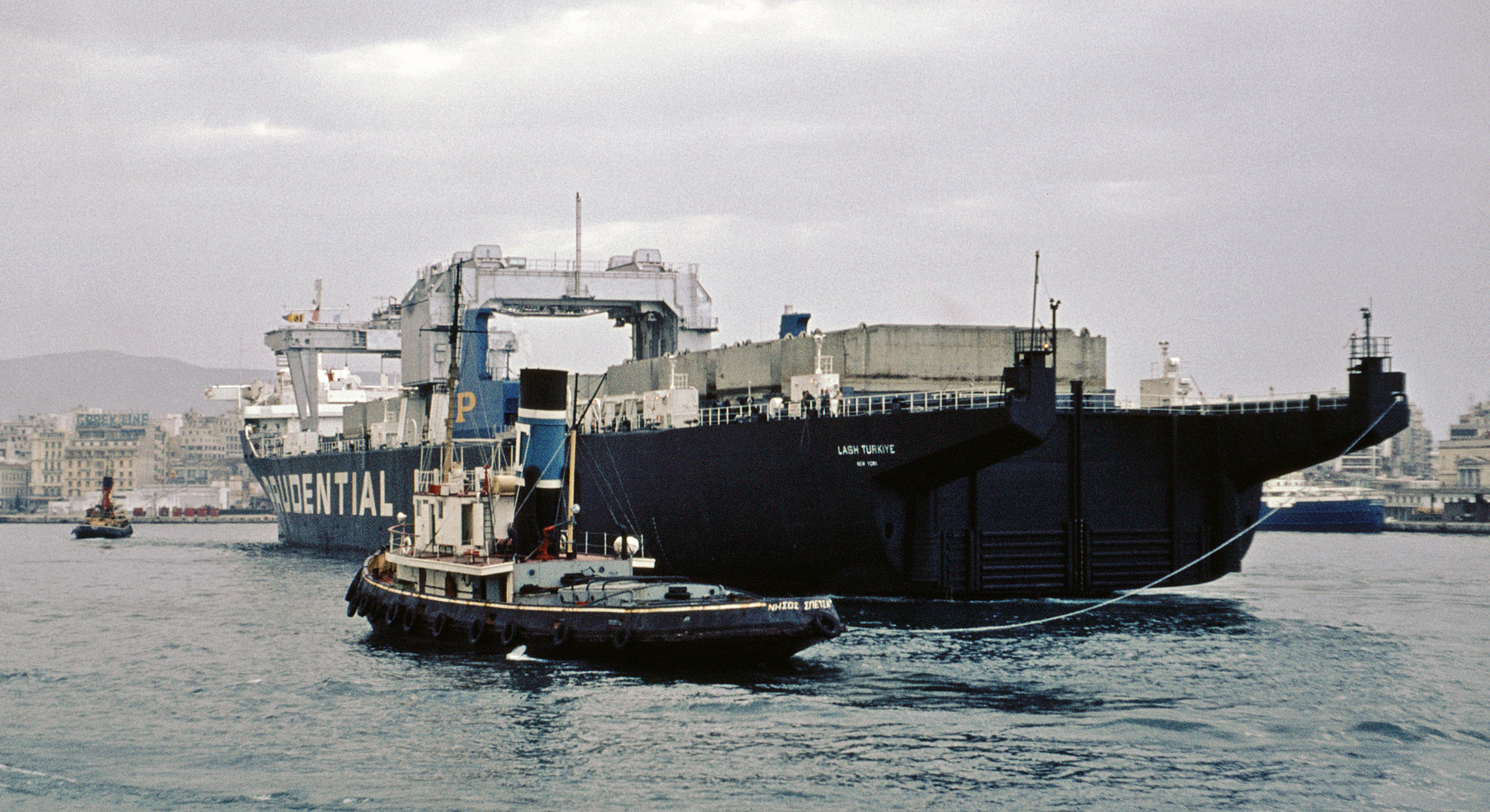
LASH Turkiye

Some ships owned:

- The Emerald, cruise ship
- Southstar, formerly USS Alamance
- Cape Fear, built in 1971. lighter aboard ship (LASH) barge carrier
- Lash Italia,
- LASH Turkiye, which became Cape Florida.
- Prudential Seajet, built in 1965
- Prudential Oceanjet, built in 1965
- Santa Magdalena
- Santa Mercedes
- Santa Mariana
- Santa Maria
  - Five Victory Ships:
- Newberry Victory
- San Angelo Victory
- Attleboro Victory
- Biddeford Victory
- Moline Victory
- South Bend Victory, operator 1950 to 1953 for Korean War
  - Four Liberty Ships:
- Sarah Orne Jewett
- Patrick B. Whalen, renamed Bostonian in 1950,
- Belgian Liberty
- Richard Montgomery, operated from 1946 to 1952, (sank in 1960).
  - Type C4-S-1A:
- USS Paul Revere

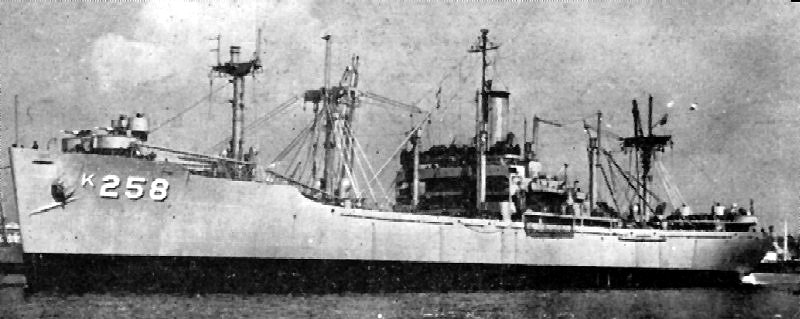
A Victory ship of World War II

Liberty ship of World War II

  - World War II and post war operated ships:
  - Liberty Ships:
- Sarah Orne Jewett
- Frank Adair Monroe
- Frank P. Walsh
- Molly Pitcher, sunk by torpedo by German submarine U-521 in the North Atlantic on March 17, 1943.
- Horace Williams
- Charles Tufts
- George W. Norris
- John E. Schmeltzer
- Eastern Guide, Liberty ship
- New Bern Victory, troopship

== See also ==
- World War II United States Merchant Navy
