= SS Attleboro Victory =

World War II Victory ship of the United States

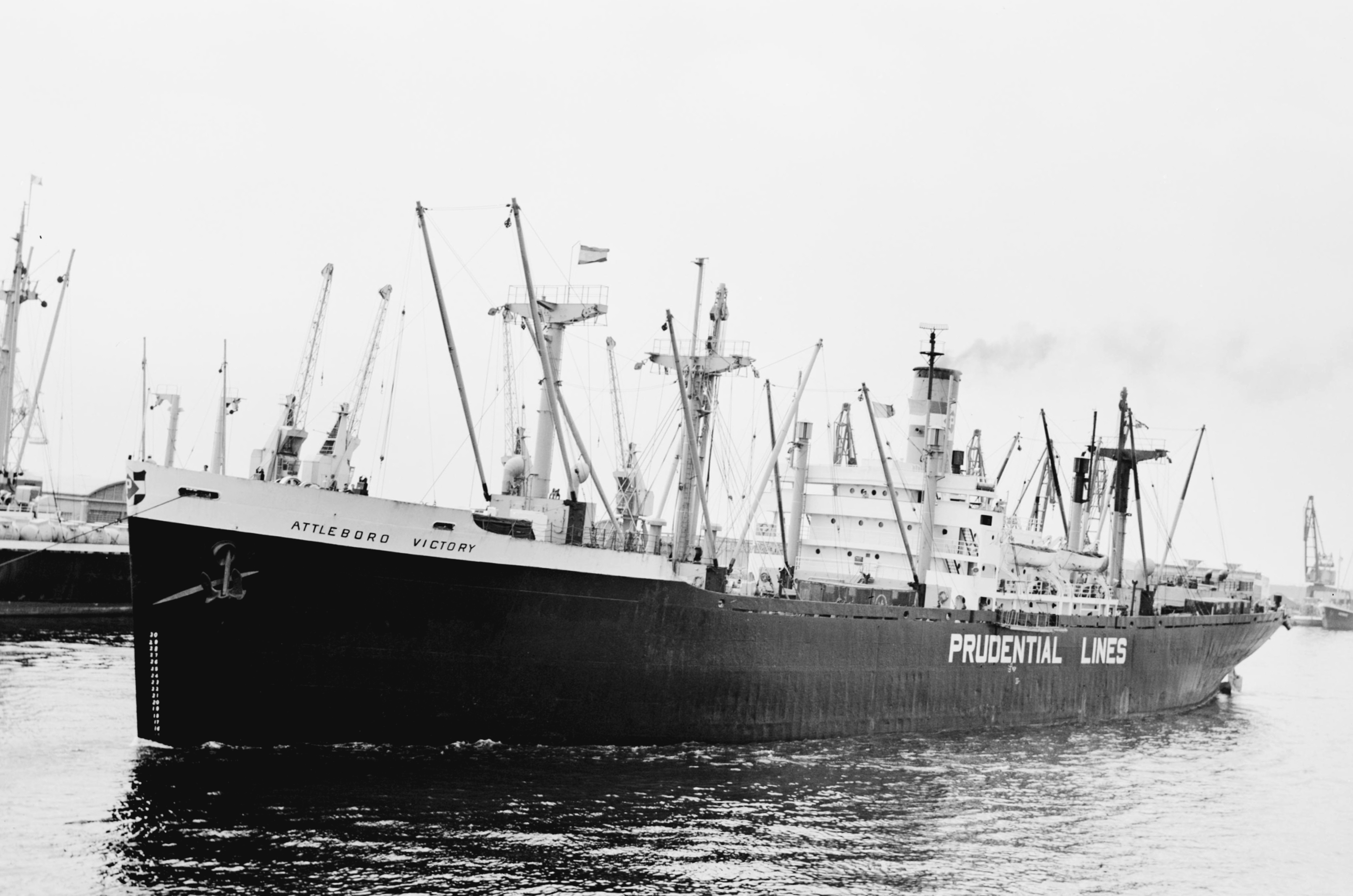
- Attleboro Victory

History

United States
- Name: Attleboro Victory
- Namesake: Attleboro, Massachusetts
- Owner: War Shipping Administration
- Operator: Stockard Steamship Corporation
- Builder: Bethlehem-Fairfield Shipyard Corp. Baltimore, Maryland
- Yard number: V-642
- Laid down: 26 January 1945
- Launched: 16 March 1945
- Completed: 10 April 1945
- Home port: New York
- Identification: IMO number: 5030268; Call sign: KCTW
- Fate: Scrapped in 1976

General characteristics
- Class & type: VC2-S-AP3 Victory ship
- Tonnage: 7612 GRT, 4,553 NRT
- Displacement: 15,200 tons
- Length: 455 ft (139 m)
- Beam: 62 ft (19 m)
- Draught: 28 ft (8.5 m)
- Installed power: 8,500 shp (6,300 kW)
- Propulsion: HP & LP turbines geared to a single 20.5-foot (6.2 m) propeller
- Speed: 16.5 knots
- Boats & landing craft carried: 4 Lifeboats
- Complement: 62 Merchant Marine and 28 US Naval Armed Guards
- Armament: 1 × 5 inch (127 mm)/38 caliber gun; 1 × 3 inch (76 mm)/50 caliber gun; 8 × 20 mm Oerlikon

SS Attleboro Victory was a Victory ship built for the War Shipping Administration late in World War II under the Emergency Shipbuilding program. It saw service in the European Theater of Operations in the Atlantic Ocean during 1945, and in the immediate post-war period. Attleboro Victory was part of the series of Victory ships named after famous cities. This particular ship was named after the city of Attleboro, Massachusetts. It was a type VC2-S-AP2/WSAT cargo ship with the United States Maritime Commission (MCV) -"Victory"; hull number 642, shipyard number 1597 and built by Bethlehem Shipbuilding Corporation in Baltimore, Maryland. Phyllis O'Neil of Attleboro, Massachusetts christened Attleboro Victory with a champagne bottle.

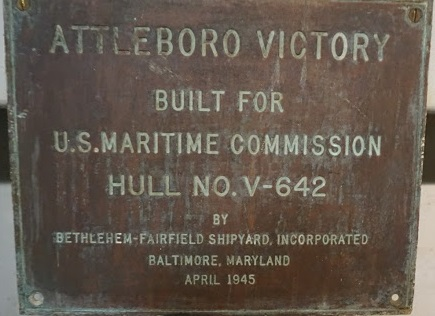
Builder plate from the Victory ship Attleboro Victory.

Attleboro Victory was one of many new 10,500-ton class ships to be known as Victory ships, designed to replace the earlier Liberty Ships. Liberty ships were designed to be used solely for World War II, whereas Victory ships were designed to last longer and to serve the US Navy after the war. Victory ships differed from Liberty ships in that they were faster, longer, wider, taller, and had a thinner stack set farther toward the superstructure. In addition, they had a long raised forecastle.

== World War II ==
Attleboro Victory was operated by the Stockard Steamship Corporation for the duration of World War II. On June 14, 1945 at midnight, Attleboro Victory hit a mine in the Black Sea. She was traveling from Odessa Russia to Constanța Romania. The mine made 16 by 16 foot hole in the port side and flooded cargo hold #2. The ship was not in danger of sinking, so she continued to port. The ship was later repaired and put back in service. There were no injuries in the explosion.

== War relief and Seacowboys ==
In 1946, after World War II, Attleboro Victory was converted to a livestock ship, also called a cowboy ship. From 1945 to 1947, the United Nations Relief and Rehabilitation Administration and the Brethren Service Committee of the Church of the Brethren sent livestock to war-torn countries. These "seagoing cowboys" made about 360 trips on 73 different ships. The Heifers for Relief project was started by the Church of the Brethren in 1942; in 1953, this became Heifer International. Attleboro Victory made five trips moving horses, heifers, and mules, as well as some chicks, rabbits, and goats. Her trips were to Greece, Crete, Poland and Czechoslovakia.

After the war relief in 1948, she was sold to the United States Lines of New York and renamed SS American Attorney.

== Korean War ==
American Attorney served as a merchant marine ship supplying goods for the Korean War. About 75 percent of the personnel serving in the Korean War were delivered by the merchant marine ships. American Attorney transported goods, mail, food, and other supplies. About 90 percent of the cargo was moved by merchant marine ships to the war zone. American Attorney made trips between 1951 and 1952. American Attorney serviced in the Inchon-Seoul Operation, App E, Task Organization of Joint Task Force Seven.

== Post-war service ==
After the Korean War, in 1956, she was sold to Transyork Shipping Corporation in New York and renamed SS Transyork.

In 1957, she was sold to Cia Naviera Continental of Monrovia, Liberia.

In 1959, she was sold to Prudential Steamship Corporation of New York and given her original name SS Attleboro Victory.

In 1968, the United States Department of Commerce in New York leased her back to Prudential.

In 1970, she was laid up in the James River as part of the National Defense Reserve Fleet. She was scrapped at Brownsville, Texas six years later.

== See also ==
- List of Victory ships
- Liberty ship
- Type C1 ship
- Type C2 ship
- Type C3 ship

== Sources ==
- Sawyer, L.A. and W.H. Mitchell. Victory ships and tankers: The history of the ‘Victory’ type cargo ships and of the tankers built in the United States of America during World War II, Cornell Maritime Press, 1974, 0-87033-182-5.
- United States Maritime Commission:
- Victory Cargo Ships
