= Ivaran Lines =

Norwegian shipping company

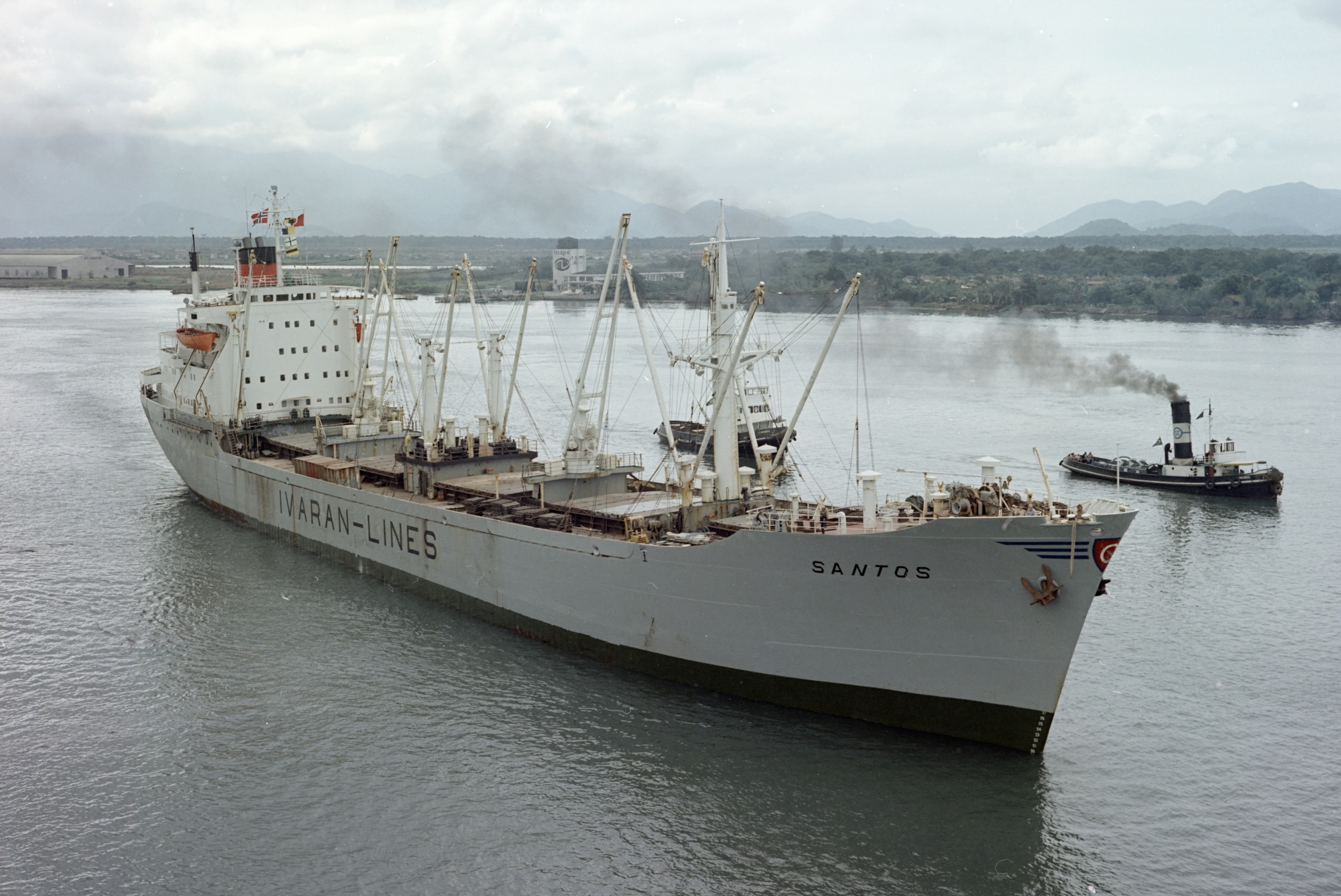
1961 built general cargo ship Santos sailed for Ivaran Lines between 1973 and 1978

Ivarans Rederi AS was a merchant steamship company founded in Norway by Ivar Anton Christensen in 1902. The flag was red with a white "C" in the middle, for the founder's family name: Christensen (a picture of this flag can be viewed at FOTW).

== History ==
=== Stockard Steamship Corporation ===
Stockard Steamship Company of New York was the major agent of Ivaran for many years. Ivaran had an involvement with Stockard resulted from World War II as they operated a tramping service between the East Coast of USA and South America which was previously managed by fellow Norwegian company A/S Holter Sørensens. In Merchant Ships (The Macmillan Company; 1944), E.C. Talbot-Booth shows the vessels Ivaran and Lise in the name of Ivaran Lines which fits with the name based New York given by F. J. N. Wedge in Brown’s Flags and Funnels (Brown, Son and Ferguson; 1951). Subsequently Ivarans appear to have re-established in Oslo under their own name.

- Stockard Steamship Corporation was active with charter shipping with the Maritime Commission and War Shipping Administration for World War II. The ship was run by its Stockard Steamship Corporation crew and the US Navy supplied United States Navy Armed Guards to man the deck guns and radio.

=== CP Ships ===
Ivaran Lines was bought by CP Ships in May 1998, being unprofitable at that time. The last Ivaran's chairman was Eirik Holter-Sorensen. CP's Ivaran brand name was replaced by the Lykes Lines brand in 2000. By 2001 CP Ships was the seventh largest carrier in the world.

When acquired by CP Ships, Ivaran Lines was operating the following services:

- U.S. East Coast to East Coast South America (with Columbus Line and Alianca)
- U.S. Gulf Coast to East Coast South America (with Grupo Libra and TMM)
- U.S. Gulf Coast to Central America and the Caribbean.

CP Ships was bought out in late 2005 by TUI AG and merged in mid-2006 in the Hapag-Lloyd organization.

== International identifiers ==
SCAC Code: IVAU
BIC Code (Container prefixes): IVLU

== Vessels ==
In the final 1980s and 1990s the fleet was composed of multi-purpose container ships, which had names taken from the Channel Islands, in Southern California, USA:

- Salvador
- Santa Fe
- San Diego
- San Clemente
- San Lorenzo
- San Miguel
- San Nicolas
- San Pedro
- San Isidro
- Santa Cruz
- San Francisco (LPG)
- Santos
- São Paulo
- Savannah
- San Luis
- San Nicolas X
- Santa Rosa
- San Marino
- San Martin
- San Juan
- Santa Catarina
- San Antonio
- Santa Margarita

They were also operating a combined container-passenger ship, the Americana.

In 1998, Ivaran Lines had a fleet of 13 container ships with a capacity between 563 and 1742 TEU.

== Stockard Steamship World War II ==
Stockard Steamship operated for World War II ships:

=== Victory ships ===
- SS Attleboro Victory

=== Liberty ships ===
- SS Dan Beard
- SS Daniel Chester French
- SS Paul Chandler
- SS Joseph C. Lincoln
- SS John L. Elliott
- SS John W. Garrett
- SS George R. Poole
- SS Thomas Sinnickson, sank July 7, 1943 torpedoed by U-185 off Brazil
- SS William Crompton
- SS Charles N. Cole
- SS Jesse Cottrell
- SS W. S. Jennings
- SS Wendell L. Willkie
- SS Edgar E Clark
- SS John H. McIntosh

=== Other ===
SS Coastal Sentry

== See also ==
- CP Ships
- Hapag-Lloyd

== Other sources ==
- SECDatabase.com: CP SHIPS LTD, Form 6-K, Filing Date Sep 7, 2004
- Locistics Management, 01. May 1998
