= List of Liberty ships (Ja–Je) =

This is a list of Liberty ships with names beginning with Ja–Je.

== Description ==
The standard Liberty ship (EC-2-S-C1 type) was a cargo ship 441 feet 6 inches (134.57 m) long overall, with a beam of 56 feet 10 3/4 inches (17.34 m). It had a depth of 37 feet 4 inches (11.38 m) and a draft of 26 feet 10 inches (8.18 m). It was powered by a triple expansion steam engine, which had cylinders of 24 1/2 inches (62 cm), 37 inches (94 cm) and 70 inches (180 cm) diameter by 48 inches (120 cm) stroke. The engine produced 2,500ihp at 76rpm. Driving a four-blade propeller 18 feet 6 inches (5.64 m) in diameter, could propel the ship at 11 knots (20 km/h).

Cargo was carried in five holds, numbered 1–5 from bow to stern. Grain capacity was 84,183 cubic feet (2,383.8 m^{3}), 145,604 cubic feet (4,123.0 m^{3}), 96,429 cubic feet (2,730.6 m^{3}), 93,190 cubic feet (2,639 m^{3}) and 93,190 cubic feet (2,639 m^{3}), with a further 49,086 cubic feet (1,390.0 m^{3}) in the deep tanks. Bale capacity was 75,405 cubic feet (2,135.2 m^{3}), 134,638 cubic feet (3,812.5 m^{3}), 83,697 cubic feet (2,370.0 m^{3}), 82,263 cubic feet (2,329.4 m^{3}) and 82,435 cubic feet (2,334.3 m^{3}), with a further 41,135 cubic feet (1,164.8 m^{3}) in the deep tanks.

It carried a crew of 45, plus 36 United States Navy Armed Guard gunners. Later in the war, this was altered to a crew of 52, plus 29 gunners. Accommodation was in a three deck superstructure placed midships. The galley was equipped with a range, a 25 US gallons (95 L) stock kettle and other appliances. Messrooms were equipped with an electric hot plate and an electric toaster.

== Jack London ==
Jack London was built by Marinship Corporation, Sausalito, California. Her keel was laid on 16 June 1943. She was launched on 16 July and delivered on 14 August. Built for the War Shipping Administration (WSA), she was operated under the management of Pacific-Atlantic Steamship Corp. Sold in 1947 to Constantine Konialidis, Montevideo, Uruguay and renamed Christostomis. Re-registered to Honduras. Sold in 1948 to Eastern Seafaring & Trading Co., Panama and renamed Nora. Operated under the management of D. J. Negroponte. Sold in 1958 to Mediterranean West Line, Palermo, Sicily, Italy and renamed Bellatrix. Sold in 1965 to Fratelli d'Amico, Rome, Italy. She was scrapped at La Spezia, Italy in April 1968.

== Jack Singer ==
Jack Singer was built by California Shipbuilding Corporation, Terminal Island, Los Angeles, California. Her keel was laid on 27 November 1943. She was launched on 23 December and delivered on 9 January 1944. Torpedoed and damaged by Japanese aircraft at Naha, Japan on 10 August 1945 and was beached. Subsequently refloated, she was drive ashore in a typhoon at Naha on 9 October 1945 and was abandoned as a constructive total loss. She was reported to have been scrapped by China Merchants & Engineers Inc., China.

== Jacob A. Westervelt ==
Jacob A. Westervelt was built by Todd Houston Shipbuilding Corporation. Her keel was laid on 24 June 1944. She was launched on 2 August and delivered on 15 August. Built for the WSA, she was laid up at Mobile, Alabama post-war. She was scrapped at Panama City, Florida in December 1972.

== Jacob Chandler Harper ==
Jacob Chandler Harper was built by Todd Houston Shipbuilding Corporation. Her keel was laid on 30 October 1944. She was launched on 4 December and delivered on 14 December. She was scrapped at Santander, Spain in April 1970.

== Jacob H. Gallingher ==
Jacob H. Gallingher was built by New England Shipbuilding Corporation, South Portland, Maine. Her keel was laid on 4 May 1943. She was launched on 23 June and delivered on 9 July. Built for the WSA, she was operated under the management of Coastwise Transport Corp. To the French Government in 1946 and renamed Cernay. Operated under the management of Chargeurs Réunis. Management transferred to Fabre Line in 1955. Sold in 1960 to Leftric Corp. and renamed Leftric. Re-registered to Liberia and operated under the management of Wigham, Richardson & Co. Ran aground at Mormugao, India on 1 July 1967. She was refloated but drifted into a breakwater, broke in two, and sank. Sold to Bombay shipbreakers, she was scrapped in situ in May 1969.

== Jacob H. Schiff ==
Jacob H. Schiff was built by Bethlehem Fairfield Shipyard, Baltimore, Maryland. Her keel was laid on 17 October 1943. She was launched as Jacob H. Schiff on 14 November and delivered as Samburgh on 22 November. To the Ministry of War Transport (MoWT) under Lend-Lease, she was operated under the management of Andrew Weir & Co. Sold in 1947 to Bank Line and renamed Tielbank, remaining under her previous managers. Sold in 1960 to Febo Amedeo Bertorella Società, Genoa, Italy and renamed Giacomo. She was driven from her moorings in the Elbe on 16 February 1962 and collided with the Soviet cargo ship Enesei, which also broke from her moorings. Sold in 1962 to Seatide Shipping Corp., Lugano, Switzerland and renamed Sorrelhorse. Re-registered to Liberia. Re-registered to Panama in 1966. She was scrapped at Split, Yugoslavia in April 1969.

== Jacob Perkins ==
Jacob Perkins was built by Todd Houston Shipbuilding Corporation. Her keel was laid on 20 December 1943. She was launched on 13 February 1944 and delivered on 25 February. Built for the WSA, she was operated under the management of Isthmian Steamship Company. To the United States War Department in 1946, loaned to the Chinese Government. Renamed Hai Tee later that year and placed under the management of China Merchants Steam Navigation Company, Shanghai. Sold to her managers in 1947. Sold in 1963 to Sincere Navigation Corp., Taipei, Taiwan and renamed Sincere Carrier. Sold in 1964 to Confidence Maritime Industries, Panama and renamed Kondor. Re-registered to Liberia and operated under the management of Oak Steamship Co. She ran aground at Onahama, Japan on 17 July 1966 whilst on a voyage from Kaohsiung, Taiwan to Onahama and was severely damaged. She was refloated and towed to Hakodate. She was scrapped at Hirao, Japan in September 1966.

== Jacob Riis ==
Jacob Riis was built by California Shipbuilding Corporation. Her keel was laid on 10 June 1943. She was launched as Jacob Riis on 3 July and delivered as Samholt on 17 July. To the MoWT under Lend-Lease, she was operated under the management of Cunard White Star Line. To the United States Maritime Commission in 1958, she was laid up in the James River. She was scrapped at Baltimore in October 1959.

== Jacob Sloat Fassett ==
Jacob Sloat Fassett was built by Southeastern Shipbuilding Corporation, Savannah, Georgia. Her keel was laid on 12 April 1944. She was launched on 31 May and delivered on 21 June. She was scrapped at Portland, Oregon in March 1965.

== Jacob S. Mansfield ==
Jacob S. Mansfield was built by California Shipbuilding Corporation. Her keel was laid on 9 May 1943. She was launched on 31 May and delivered on 14 June. Laid up at Mobile post-war, She struck the Sunshine Skyway Bridge, St. Petersburg, Florida on 31 August 1970 whilst under tow to the shipbreakers. She was scrapped at Tampa, Florida in November 1970.

== Jacob Thompson ==
Jacob Thompson was a tanker built by Delta Shipbuilding Company, New Orleans, Louisiana. Her keel was laid on 7 June 1943. She was launched on 5 August and delivered on 8 October. Built for the WSA, she was operated under the management of Marine Transport Lines. Sold in 1948 to Southeastern Tankers Inc., Wilmington, Delaware, then sold later that year to Southeastern Oil Inc., Jacksonville, Florida. Sold in 1950 to Petroleos Mexicanos, Mexico City, Mexico and renamed Atzcapotzalco. She was scrapped at Minatitlán, Mexico in 1968.

== Jacques Cartier ==
Jacques Cartier was built by California Shipbuilding Corporation. Her keel was laid on 6 March 1943. She was launched on 2 April and delivered on 16 April. She was scrapped at Baltimore in April 1962.

== Jacques Laramie ==
Jacques Laramie was built by Permanente Metals Corporation, Richmond, California. Her keel was laid on 12 February 1943. She was launched on 12 March and delivered on 23 March. Built for the WSA, she was laid up at Beaumont, Texas post-war. She was scrapped at Brownsville, Texas in March 1972.

== Jacques Phillippe Villere ==
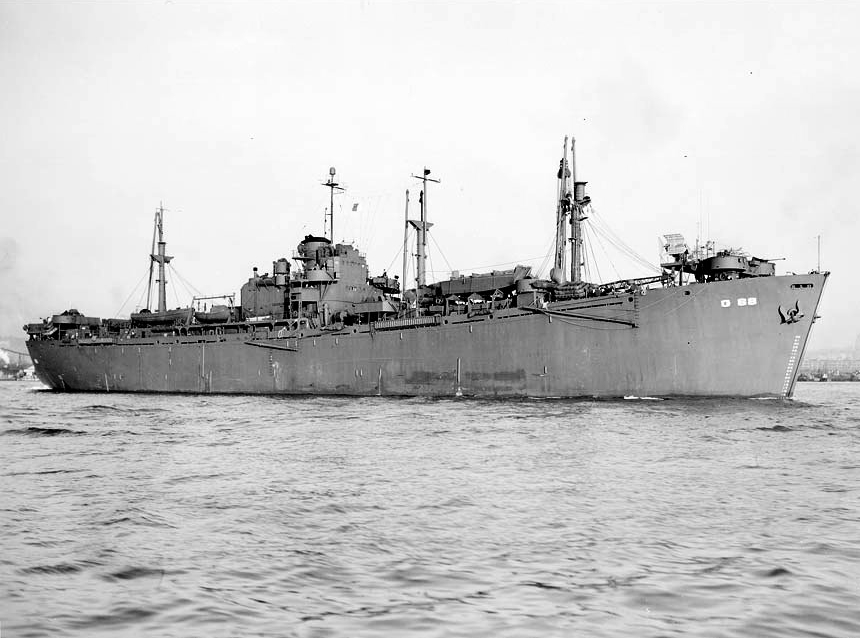
USS Basilan

Jacques Philippe Villere was built by Delta Shipbuilding Company. Her keel was laid on 5 February 1944. She was launched on 21 March and delivered on 21 April. Completed as Basilan for the United States Navy by Waterman Steamship Company at Mobile. Laid up in reserve in April 1946. Returned to USMC in May 1947 and laid up in Suisun Bay. She was sold to shipbreakers in Portland, Oregon in June 1972.

== Jagger Seam ==
Jagger Seam was a collier built by Delta Shipbuilding Company. Her keel was laid on 15 September 1944. She was launched on 18 December and delivered on 12 March 1945. Built for the WSA, she was operated under the management of Eastern Gas & Fuel Association, Boston, Massachusetts. Sold to her managers in 1946. Sold in 1947 to Mystic Steamship Division and renamed Boston. Operated under the management of her previous owner. Sold in 1961 to Massachusetts Trustees of Eastern Gas & Fuel Association. Sold in 1963 to Mystic Steamship Corporation, Boston. Sold in 1968 to Linwood Shipping Co., Boston. She was scrapped at Kaohsiung in August 1968.

== James A. Bayard ==
James A. Bayard was built by Permanente Metals Corporation. Her keel was laid on 8 April 1943. She was launched on 10 May and delivered on 27 May. She was scrapped at Philadelphia, Pennsylvania in April 1963.

== James A. Butts ==
James A. Butts was built by New England Shipbuilding Corporation. Her keel was laid on 14 December 1944. She was launched on 3 February 1945 and delivered on 17 February. Built for the WSA, she was operated under the management of Calmar Steamship Company. Management transferred to States Marine Corp. in 1946. Sold in 1947 to States Marine Corp. of Delaware and renamed Lone Star State, remaining under her previous management. Sold in 1955 to Ace Steamship Corp. and renamed Anniston. Operated under the management of Overseas Navigation Corp. Sold in 1957 to Caldwell Navigation Corp. and renamed Caldwell. Re-registered to Liberia, remaining under the same management. Sold later that year to Ridgefield Navigation Corp. and renamed Ridgefield. Operated under the management of Seaways Shipping Corp. Management transferred to Marine Transport Lines in 1951. Ran aground on Grand Cayman, Cayman Islands (19°18′N 81°50′W) on 18 December 1962. She later broke in two and was a total loss.

== James A. Drain ==
James A. Drain was built by Permanente Metals Corporation. Her keel was laid on 20 March 1944. She was launched on 8 April and delivered on 17 April. Built for the WSA, she was operated under the management of Interocean Steamship Corp. Management transferred to Olympic Steamship Co., Seattle, Washington in 1946. Sold to her managers in 1947 and renamed Olympic Pioneer. Sold in 1962 to Cargo & Tankers Inc., New York and renamed Wildcat. Returned to the American Government in 1963 and laid up in the James River. She was scrapped at Burriana, Spain in June 1972.

== James A. Farrell ==
James A. Farrell was built by Bethlehem Fairfield Shipyard. Her keel was laid on 11 June 1943. She was launched on 12 July and delivered on 23 July. Built for the WSA, she was operated under the management of American South African Line. Torpedoed and damaged in the English Channel 30 nautical miles (56 km) south of the Isle of Wight, United Kingdom (50°07′N 0°47′W) by German submarine U-984 on 29 June 1944 whilst on a voyage from Southampton, United Kingdom to Omaha Beach, France. She was towed to Spithead and then beached at Netley on 1 July. Declared a constructive total loss, she was scrapped in situ in October 1944.

== James A. Wetmore ==
James A. Wetmore was built by J. A. Jones Construction Company, Brunswick, Georgia. Her keel was laid on 14 August 1943. She was launched on 30 October and delivered on 11 November. Built for the WSA, she was operated under the management of William J. Rountree Co. She was scrapped at Philadelphia in August 1967.

== James A. Wilder ==
James A. Wilder was built by California Shipbuilding Corporation. Her keel was laid on 17 December 1943. She was launched on 14 January 1944 and delivered on 29 January. Built for the WSA, she was operated under the management of Pope & Talbot Inc. Sold in 1947 to Ave Bianchi, Genoa and renamed Fides. Sold in 1949 to Fratelli Grimaldi Raggrupamento Armatore, Genoa. She ran aground on the Großer Vogelsand, in the Elbe Estuary on 20 January 1962 whilst on a voyage from Corpus Christi, Texas, United States to Gdynia, Poland. She broke in two and was a total loss.

== James Barbour ==
James Barbour was built by Todd Houston Shipbuilding Corporation. Her keel was laid on 19 December 1942. She was launched on 10 February 1943 and delivered on 25 February. Built for the WSA, she was laid up in Puget Sound post-war. She was scrapped in Clatshanie, Oregon in November 1970.

== James B. Aswell ==
James B. Aswell was built by Delta Shipbuilding Company. Her keel was laid on 18 December 1943. She was launched on 10 February 1944 and delivered on 10 March. Built for the WSA, she was operated under the management of Marine Transport Lines. Sold in 1947 to Compania Navigation del Caribe, London, United Kingdom and renamed Liberator. Re-registered to Panama. Sold later that year to Compania Navigation Panamericana, Panama. Operated under the management of Blidberg Rothchild Company. Management transferred to Diamantis Pateras Ltd. in 1953. Two injured crew members were taken off the ship by RMS Queen Mary on 29 January 1955. Sold in 1957 to Compania Navigation del Caribe., remaining under the same management. Re-registered to Greece in 1959. Sold in 1964 to Surena Compania Navigation, Panama and renamed Thios Costas. Remaining registered in Greece, and operated under the management of Carapanayoti & Co. Re-registered to Somalia in 1968 and placed under the management of Shipping & Produce Co. Sold in 1969 to Cape Gata Shipping Co., Famagusta, Cyprus, remaining under the same management. She was scrapped at Hsinkang, China in October 1971.

== James B. Bonham ==
James B. Bonham was built by Todd Houston Shipbuilding Corporation. Her keel was laid on 20 March 1943. She was launched on 4 May and delivered on 21 May. She was scrapped at Portland, Oregon in November 1966.

== James B. Duke ==
James B. Duke was built by J. A. Jones Construction Company, Brunswick. Her keel was laid on 29 April 1944. She was launched on 19 June and delivered on 30 June. Built for the WSA, she was operated under the management of Wessel Duval Co. Laid up at Beaumont post-war, she was scrapped at Brownsville in July 1972.

== James B. Eads ==
James B. Eads was built by Oregon Shipbuilding Corporation, Portland, Oregon. Her keel was laid on 12 October 1942. She was launched on 9 November and delivered on 19 November. Laid up in the Hudson River post-war, she was sold to a buyer in Karachi, Pakistan in December 1970. Resold, she was scrapped at Burriana in August 1971.

== James Bennett Moore ==
James Bennett Moore was built by J. A. Jones Construction Company, Brunswick. Her keel was laid on 15 December 1944. She was launched on 19 January 1945 and delivered on 31 January. Built for the WSA, she was operated under the management of A. L. Burbank & Co. Laid up at Mobile post-war, she was scrapped at Panama City, Florida in June 1971.

== James B. Francis ==
James B. Francis was built by Permanente Metals Corporation. Her keel was laid on 27 August 1942. She was launched on 7 October and delivered on 16 October. She was scrapped at Kearny, New Jersey in March 1966.

== James B. Hickok ==
James B. Hickok was built by Permanente Metals Corporation. Her keel was laid on 24 January 1943. She was launched on 26 February and delivered on 8 March. Built for the WSA, she was operated under the management of Polaris Steamship Co. Sold in 1947 to Southern Steamships Ltd., Johannesburg, Union of South Africa and renamed President Pretorius. Sold later that year to Northern Steamships Ltd., Johannesburg. Sold in 1952 to Compania Navigation Hidalgo, Monrovia, Liberia and renamed Centurion. Operated under the management of Southern Star Shipping Co. Sold in 1954 to Compania Navigation Prodromos, Panama and renamed Prodromos. Remained registered in Liberia, and operated under the management of Lemos & Pateras. Collided with the Greek cargo ship King Minos in the English Channel 12 nautical miles (22 km) off Dungeness, United Kingdom (50°46′N 0°55′E) on 3 December 1958 whilst on a voyage from Montreal, Canada to Helsinki, Finland. She broke in two, with the stern section presumed to have sunk. The bow section was taken in tow and beached two and a half nautical miles (5 kilometres) south of Rye Harbour. It was refloated on 10 December and towed to Boulogne, France. She was declared a constructive total loss. The bow section was scrapped at Antwerp, Belgium in January 1959.

== James Blair ==
James Blair was built by Bethlehem Fairfield Shipyard. Her keel was laid on 28 July 1943. She was launched as James Blair on 26 August and delivered as Samarina on 3 September. To the MoWT under Lend-Lease. Operated under the management of Westcott & Laurence Line. Sold in 1947 to Ellerman Lines Ltd., London and renamed City of Ely. Operated under the management of Ellerman & Bucknall Steamship Co. She collided with the Philippine cargo ship Susana in the Suez Canal on 7 January 1960. Both ships were damaged. Sold in 1961 to Trader Line Ltd., Bermuda and renamed Paget Trader. Remained registered in the UK, and operated under the management of Moller Line Ltd. Caught fire in the Indian Ocean (5°45′N 94°00′E) on 2 November 1965. She put in to Singapore on 6 November. Subsequently, laid up at Hong Kong. She was scrapped at Kaohsiung in August 1966.

== James B. McPherson ==
James B. McPherson was built by California Shipbuilding Corporation. Her keel was laid on 25 August 1942. She was launched on 4 October and delivered on 22 October. She was scrapped at Baltimore in March 1962.

== James B. Miller ==
James B. Miller was built by Oregon Shipbuilding Corporation. Her keel was laid on 24 November 1943. She was launched on 8 December and delivered on 23 December. She was scrapped at Philadelphia in 1961.

== James Bowdoin ==
James Bowdoin was built by New England Shipbuilding Corporation. Her keel was laid on 15 June 1943. She was launched on 1 August and delivered on 14 August. Laid up in the James River post war, she arrived at Bilbao, Spain for scrapping in November 1972.

== James Bowie ==
James Bowie was built by Todd Houston Shipbuilding Corporation. Her keel was laid on 10 August 1942. She was launched on 27 October and delivered on 16 November. Built for the WSA, she was laid up at Beaumont post-war. She was scrapped at Brownsville in December 1971.

== James B. Richardson ==
James B. Richardson was built by North Carolina Shipbuilding Company. Her keel was laid on 23 August 1942. She was launched on 15 October and delivered on 24 October. She ran aground off Urville, France on 16 December 1951 whilst on a voyage from Philadelphia to Cherbourg, France. She broke her back the next day. She was refloated on 23 December and towed in to Cherbourg, where temporary repairs were made. She was towed to the Hudson River and laid up. She was scuttled off the coast of New Jersey (approximately 39°30′N 71°00′W) with a cargo of obsolete ammunition on 1 July 1968.

== James B. Stephens ==
James B. Stephens was built by Oregon Shipbuilding Corporation. Her keel was laid on 11 September 1942. She was launched on 11 October and delivered on 21 October. Built for the WSA, she was operated under the management of United States Lines. Torpedoed in the Indian Ocean 120 nautical miles (220 km) north east of Durban, Union of South Africa (29°05′S 32°46′E) by U-160 on 8 March 1943. She broke in two. The bow section caught fire, and sank more than a week later. The stern section was discovered more than 50 nautical miles (93 km) from the location of the attack, and was sunk by South African Seaward Defence Force warships.

== James Buchanan ==
James Buchanan was built by California Shipbuilding Corporation. Her keel was laid on 21 November 1942. She was launched on 23 December and delivered on 8 January 1943. Built for the WSA, she was operated under the management of Matson Navigation Co. To the French Government in 1947 and renamed Saint Lo. Operated under the management of Compagnie Générale Transatlantique. Sold in 1961 to Compania Santa Virginia, Panama and renamed Athenian. Operated under the management of Wigham, Richardson & Co. Sold in 1967 to Arta Shipping Co., Nicosia, Cyprus and renamed Glee. She ran aground on Marmara Island, Turkey on 23 December 1968 and was declared a constructive total loss. She was scrapped at Shanghai in July 1969.

== =ames B. Weaver ==
James B. Weaver was built by California Shipbuilding Corporation. Her keel was laid on 24 February 1943. She was launched on 23 March and delivered on 7 April. She was scrapped at Portland, Oregon in 1965.

== James Caldwell ==
James Caldwell was built by Bethlehem Fairfield Shipyard. Her keel was laid on 8 August 1942. She was launched on 19 September and delivered on 26 September. Built for the WSA, she was laid up at Mobile post-war. She was scuttled off Horn Island, Mississippi on 21 May 1976.

== James Carroll ==
James Carroll was built by Bethlehem Fairfield Shipyard. Her keel was laid on 19 October 1943. She was launched as James Carroll on 16 November and delivered as Samgara on 25 November. To the MoWT under Lend-Lease. Operated under the management of A. Holt & Co. Sold in 1947 to Ocean Steamship Co. and renamed Titan, remaining under the same management. Sold in 1950 to Glen Line Ltd., London and renamed Flintshire. Sold in 1957 to Ocean Steamship Co. and renamed Titan. Operated under the management of A. Holt & Co. Sold in 1962 to Tidewater Commercial Co., Baltimore and renamed Titanus. Re-registered to Liberia. She was scrapped at Mihara, Japan in December 1969.

== James C. Cameron ==
James C. Cameron was built by Bethlehem Fairfield Shipyard. Her keel was laid on 31 October 1943. She was launched on 25 November and delivered on 3 December. She was scrapped at Panama City, Florida in 1961.

== James Cook ==
James Cook was a tanker built by California Shipbuilding Corporation. She was completed in October 1943. Built for the WSA, she was operated under the management of Pacific Tanker Corp. Sold in 1948 to Richfield Oil Corp., Los Angeles. Sold in 1955 to San Rafael Compania Navigation, Panama and renamed Antipolis. Re-registered to Liberia and operated under the management of Orion Shipping & Trading Co. Converted to a cargo ship at Greenock, United Kingdom. Now 7,267 GRT. Lengthened at Kure, Japan in 1956. Now 511 feet 6 inches (155.91 m) long and 8,540 GRT. Renamed Andros City in 1957.Sold in 1960 to Export Carriers Corp. and renamed Thermaikos. Re-registered to Greece, remaining under the same management. Sold in 1963 to Helicon Maritime Corp. and renamed Calliope. Re-registered to Liberia and operated under the management of Constellation Maritime Agencies. Sold in 1965 to Triumph Shipping Corp. and renamed Vancalt. Operated under the management of Tramp Marine Agencies. Sold in 1966 to Far Shipping & Trading Co. and renamed Michico. Remaining under the same management. She ran aground at Punta del Frai, 4 nautical miles (7.4 km) south of Algeciras, Spain on 16 June 1967 whilst on a voyage from Gela, Sicily to Puerto Cabello, Venezuela and was severely damaged. She was refloated and towed in to Algeciras, then towed to Cartagena, Spain. Declared a constructive total loss. She was towed to Genoa and sold for scrapping.n

== James D. Doty ==
James D. Doty was built by Oregon Shipbuilding Corporation. Her keel was laid on 9 September 1943. She was launched on 24 September and delivered on 30 September. She was scrapped at Yokosuka, Japan in August 1961.

== James Devereux ==
James Devereux was built by Permanente Metals Corporation. Her keel was laid on 17 January 1944. She was launched on 5 February and delivered on 12 February. Built for the WSA, she was operated under the management of Pacific-Atlantic Steamship Co. To the French Government in 1947 and renamed Montbeliard. Operated under the management of Chargeurs Réunis. Sold in 1966 to Compania de Navigation Miramar, Panama and renamed Geowilka. Re-registered to Greece and operated under the management of Marchessini & Co. She ran aground off Gedser, Denmark (54°29′N 12°06′E) on 12 December 1967. She was refloated on 16 December and taken in to Szczecin, Poland. Declared a constructive total loss, she arrived under tow at Hamburg, West Germany on 1 March 1968 for scrapping.

== James De Wolf ==
James De Wolf was built by Walsh-Kaiser Company, Providence, Rhode Island. Her keel was laid on 15 August 1942. She was launched on 29 April 1943 and delivered on 9 June. She was scrapped at Seattle in June 1961.

== James D. Phelan ==
James D. Phelan was built by Permanente Metals Corporation. Her keel was laid on 6 September 1943. She was launched on 25 September and delivered on 4 October. Built for the WSA, she was operated under the management of American President Lines. Sold in 1947 to Scindia Steam Navigation Co., Bombay and renamed Jalakanata. She was scrapped at Bombay in September 1963.

== James D. Trask ==
James D. Trask was built by Bethlehem Fairfield Shipyard. Her keel was laid on 5 April 1944. She was launched on 8 May and delivered on 19 May. Built for the WSA, she was operated under the management of International Freighting Corp. Management transferred to Isbrandtsen Co. in 1946. Sold in 1948 to Mount Steamship Corp. and renamed Arkansan. Operated under the management of American-Hawaiian Steamship Company, New York. Sold to her managers in 1949. Sold in 1950 to Pantransit Steamship Corp., Panama and renamed Oregonian, remaining registered in the US. Sold in 1954 to Rio Caribea Compania Armamente, Panama and New York and renamed Eviliz. Re-registered to Liberia and operated under the management of Starboard Shipping Co. Lengthened at Innoshima, Japan in 1955. Now 511 feet 6 inches (155.91 m) long and 8,370 GRT. Sold in 1959 to Doric Shipping & Trading Co., New York. Placed under the management of Starboard Shipping Inc. in 1961. She was scrapped at Mukaishima, Japan in 1968.

== James Duncan ==
James Duncan was built by Oregon Shipbuilding Corporation. Her keel was laid on 5 August 1942. She was launched on 7 September and delivered on 18 September. She was scrapped at Panama City, Florida in November 1962.

== James Eagan Layne ==
James Eagan Layne was built by Delta Shipbuilding Company. Her keel was laid on 23 October 1944. She was launched on 2 December and delivered on 18 December. Built for the WSA, she was operated under the management of U.S. Navigation Co. Torpedoed and damaged in the English Channel 7 nautical miles (13 km) off Plymouth, United Kingdom by U-1195 on 21 March 1945 whilst on a voyage from Barry, United Kingdom to Ghent, Belgium as a member of Convoy BTC 103. Taken under tow, but sank in Whitesand Bay.

== James E. Haviland ==
James E. Haviland was built by Todd Houston Shipbuilding Corporation. Her keel was laid on 12 April 1943. She was launched on 24 May and delivered on 8 June. Laid up in the James River post-war, she was partly dismantled at Newport News, Virginia then scuttled off the Virginia Capes on 19 March 1976.

== James E. Howard ==
James E. Howard was built by Delta Shipbuilding Company. Here keel was laid on 16 March 1943. She was launched on 21 April and delivered on 8 May. Laid up in the Hudson River post-war, she was scrapped at Bordentown, New Jersey in January 1971.

== James Fenimore Cooper ==
James Fenimore Cooper was built by Oregon Shipbuilding Corporation. Her keel was laid on 12 April 1942. She was launched on 22 May and delivered on 8 June. Built for the WSA, she was operated under the management of American President Lines. Laid up in 1946, she was returned to service in 1947 under the management of Luckenbach Steamship Co., Inc. Laid up in 1949, she was sold in 1951 to North American Shipping & Trading Co., New York. and renamed Mohawk. Sold in 1955 to Algonkin Co. Inc. and renamed Algonkin. Operated under the management of Transoceanic Marine Inc. Sold in 1956 to World Loyalty Corp and renamed World Loyalty. Re-registered to Liberia, remaining under the same management. Sold in 1961 to Agamemnon Shipping Co. Operated under the management of Niarchos Ltd. Sold in 1962 to Panamanian Marine Enterprises, Panama and renamed Faro. Remaining registered in Liberia, and operated under the management of Hong Kong & Associated Marine Industries. Ran aground 2 nautical miles (3.7 km) off Nojima, Japan (34°53′N 139°55′E) on 4 January 1966 whilst on a voyage from Muroran, Japan to Keelung, Taiwan. Declared a constructive total loss, she was sold to Japanese shipbreakers in 1967 and scrapped in situ.

== James Fergus ==
James Fergus was built by Permanente Metals Corporation. Her keel was laid on 15 June 1943. She was launched on 13 July and delivered on 26 July. She was scrapped at Bilbao in July 1770.

== James F. Harrell ==
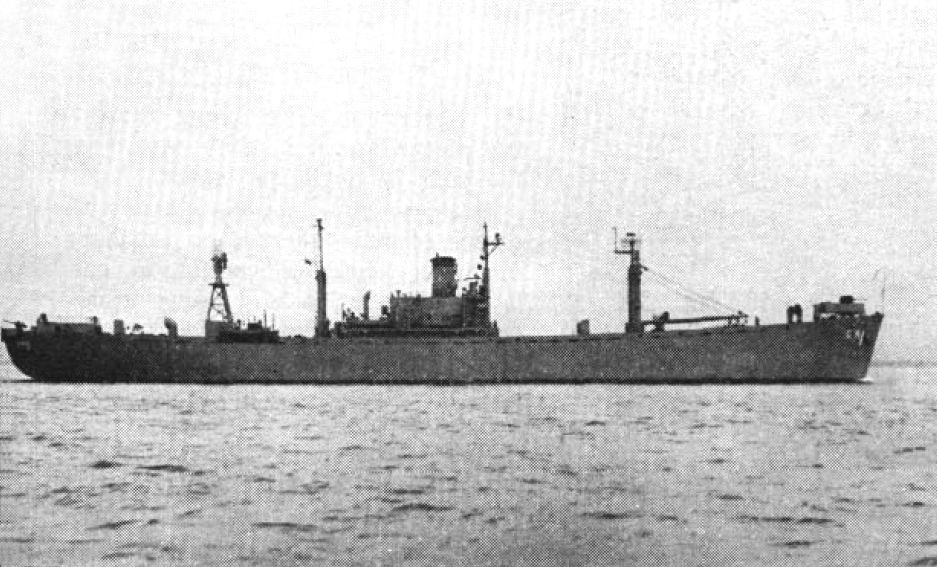
USS Picket

James F. Harrell was a boxed aircraft transport built by J. A. Jones Construction Company, Panama City. Her keel was laid on 28 May 1945. She was launched on 17 May and delivered on 11 June. Laid up in the James River in October 1945, she was returned to service in January 1947. Laid up at Wilmington, North Carolina in August 1948. To the United States Navy in July 1955 and renamed Picket. Converted for naval use at Portsmouth Navy Yard. Laid up in Suisun Bay in September 1965. She was scrapped at Richmond in January 1978.

== James Ford Rhodes ==
James Ford Rhodes was built by California Shipbuilding Corporation. Her keel was laid on 7 June 1942. She was launched on 19 July and delivered on 6 August. She was scrapped at Panama City, Florida in 1964.

== James G. Birney ==
James G. Birney was built by California Shipbuilding Corporation. Her keel was laid on 30 January 1943. She was launched on 27 February and delivered on 15 March. She was scrapped at Panama City, Florida in January 1967.

== James G. Blaine ==
James G. Blaine was built by New England Shipbuilding Corporation. Her keel was laid on 7 March 1942. She was launched on 7 September and delivered on 21 September. She was scrapped at Kearny in December 1969.

== James G. Maguire ==
James G. Maguire was built by Permanente Metals Corporation. Her keek was laid on 19 October 1943. She was launched on 7 November and delivered on 15 November. Built for the WSA, she was operated under the management of Burns Steamship Company. Sold in 1947 to Giuseppe Gavarone fu Giuseppe, Genoa and renamed Ninetto Gavarone. Sold in 1960 to Maritima Genoese, Genoa and renamed Cadore Secondo. Sold in 1962 to the Polish Government and renamed Huta Labendy. Operated under the management of Polska Żegluga Morska, Szczecin. Sold to her managers in 1972. She was sold to shipbreakers at Bilbao in December 1972.

== James Gordon Bennett ==
James Gordon Bennett was built by California Shipbuilding Corporation. Her keel was laid on 9 August 1942. She was launched on 14 September and delivered on 30 September. She was scrapped at Baltimore in August 1961.

== James G. Squires ==
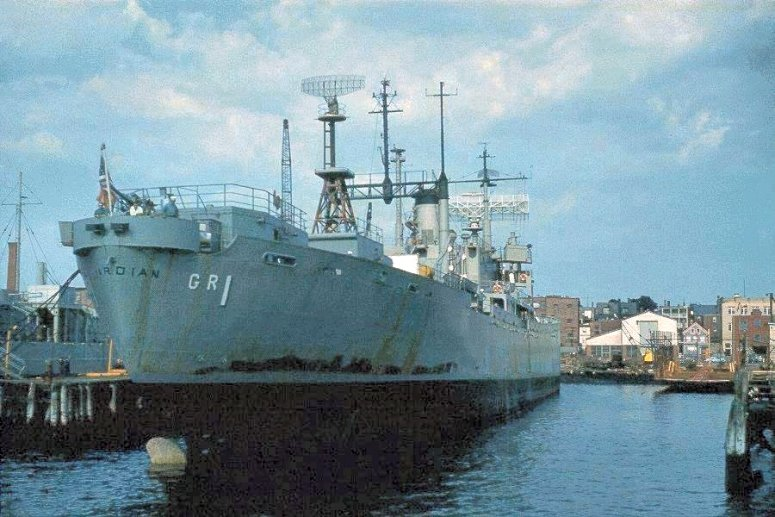
USS Guardian

James G. Squires was a boxed aircraft transport built by J. A. Jones Construction Company, Panama City. Her keel was laid on 20 March 1945. She was launched on 8 May and delivered on 31 May. Laid up in the James River in October 1945. She was acquired by the United States Navy in 1954 and renamed Guardian. Converted for naval use at Charleston Naval Shipyard. Placed in reserve in September 1958 and laid up in the Hudson River. She arrived at Bilbao in January 1971 for scrapping.

== James Gunn ==
James Gunn was built by Bethlehem Fairfield Shipyard. Her keel was laid on 6 April 1942. She was launched on 8 June and delivered on 26 June. Laid up at Beaumont post-war, she was scrapped at New Orleans in December 1970.

== James Guthrie ==
James Guthrie was built by Permanente Metals Corporation. Her keel was laid on 26 February 1943. She was launched on 26 March and delivered on 9 April. Built for the WSA, she was operated under the management of Agwilines Inc. She struck a mine in the Tyrrhenian Sea south of Capri, Italy on 17 April 1944 whilst on a voyage from Naples to an American port as a member of Convoy NV33. She was towed to Naples and beached, but broke in two and was declared a constructive total loss. She was scrapped in Naples in 1947.

== James Harlan ==
James Harlan was built by Permanente Metals Corporation. Her keel was laid on 11 May 1943. She was launched on 7 June and delivered on 25 June. Built for the WSA, she was operated under the management of Seas Shipping Co. Sold in 1946 to Compania Farallon de Navigation, Panama and renamed Nueva Fortuna. Re-registered to Honduras and operated under the management of Dow & Symmers. Management transferred to Boyd, Weir & Sewell in 1953, then to Fafalios Ltd. in 1954. Sold in 1956 to Eftolmia Compania Navigation, Panama and renamed Theoforos. Re-registered to Honduras and operated under the management of Lemos Bros. Re-registered to Greece in 1961. She ran aground on the Kuradimuna Rocks, in the Gulf of Bothnia off Tallinn, Estonia on 9 September 1962 whilst on a voyage from Leningrad, Soviet Union to a Cuban port. She was refloated the next day and towed in to Tallinn. Declared a constructive total loss, she was scrapped at Helsinki, Finland in November 1962.

== James Harrod ==
James Harrod was built by Oregon Shipbuilding Corporation. Her keel was laid on 9 February 1943. She was launched on 3 March and delivered on 13 March. Built for the WSA, she was operated under the management of Sudden & Christensen. Collided with the Liberty ship Raymond B. Stevens in The Downs on 16 January 1945 whilst on a voyage from New York to Antwerp. She caught fire and was beached in Pegwell Bay, where she broke in two. The bow section was refloated on 30 April 1945. It was eventually laid up in the River Blackwater, before being scuttled at sea with a cargo of obsolete chemical ammunition on 17 May 1946. The stern section was subsequently scrapped at Antwerp.

== James H. Breasted ==
James H. Breasted was built by Permanente Metals Corporation. Her keel was laid on 19 January 1944. She was launched on 10 February and delivered on 19 March. Built for the WSA, she was operated under the management of American President Lines. She was bombed by Japanese aircraft at Mindoro, Philippines on 26 December 1944 whilst on a voyage from Leyte to Mindoro. She was set afire, exploded and sank.

== James H. Couper ==
James H. Couper was built by Southeastern Shipbuilding Corporation. Her keel was laid on 7 August 1943. She was launched on 1 October and delivered on 14 October. She was scrapped at Portland, Oregon in August 1965.

== James H. Courts ==
James H. Courts was built by St. Johns River Shipbuilding Company. Her keel was laid on 12 December 1944. She was launched on 21 January 1945 and delivered on 31 January. To the Greek Government under Lend-Lease and renamed Niki. Sold in 1946 to Kassos Steam Navigation Co., Syra. Operated under the management of Rethymnis & Kulukundis. Renamed Hadiotis in 1947. Sold in 1965 to Compania Navigation Tierra del Fuego, Panama and renamed Achilles. Remaining registered in Greece, and operated under the management of Counties Ship Management. She ran aground at Muroran on 21 November 1965. She was refloated on 2 December. Declared a constructive total loss, she was scrapped at Osaka, Japan in January 1966.

== James H. Kimball ==
James H. Kimball was built by J. A. Jones Construction Company, Panama City. Her keel was laid on 7 March 1944. She was launched on 22 April and delivered on 16 May. Built for the WSA, she was operated under the management of American Export Lines. Sold in 1947 to Compania Navigation Azuero and renamed Azuero. Re-registered to Panama and operated under the management of Embiricos Ltd. She ran aground in the Gironde on 24 December 1968 whilst on a voyage from Recife, Brazil to Bordeaux, France. She broke in two and sank.

== James H. Lane ==
James H. Lane was built by Oregon Shipbuilding Corporation. Her keel was laid on 9 October 1943. She was launched on 29 October and delivered on 6 November. Built for the WSA, she was operated under the management of Pacific-Atlantic Steamship Co. Management transferred to Grace Line Inc. in 1946. Sold in 1949 to Global Navigation Co., New York and renamed Ocean Navigator. Sold in 1955 to Duchess Marine Corp. and renamed Pleiades. Re-registered to Liberia and operated under the management of her previous owner. Sold in 1956 to Compania Maritima Unitas, Panama and renamed Captain George, remaining under the same management. She ran aground off Maio, Cape Verde (15°21′N 23°10′W) on 16 October 1957 whilst on a voyage from Kassa Island, French Guinea to Port Alfred, Union of South Africa. Declared a constructive total loss, her wreck was sold for scrap in 1958.

== James H. McClintock ==
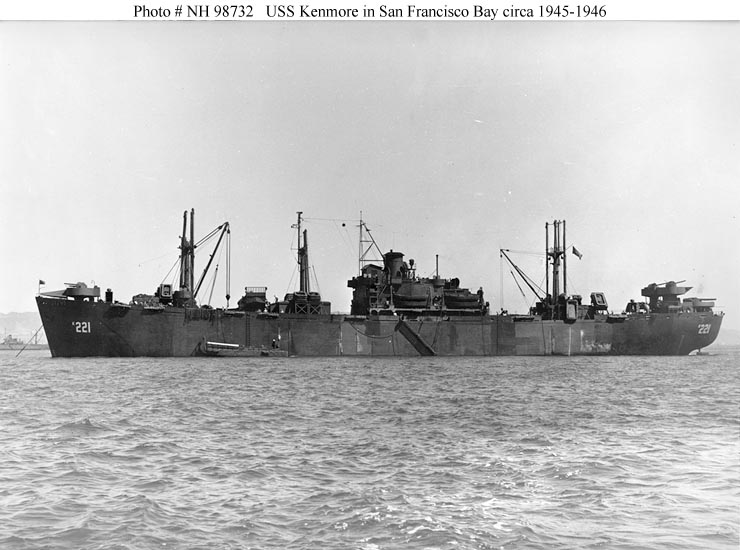
USS Kenmore

James H. McClintock was built by California Shipbuilding Corporation. Her keel was laid on 8 May 1943. She was launched as James H. McClintock on 30 May and delivered to the United States Navy as Kenmore on 12 June. Returned to the WSA in January 1946 and renamed James H. McClintock. Laid up in Suisun Bay. She was sold in February 1973 for scrapping at Kaohsiung.

== James Hoban ==
James Hoban was built by Alabama Drydock Company, Mobile. She was completed on 21 November 1942. She was scrapped at Philadelphia in 1961.

== James H. Price ==
James H. Price was built by Southeastern Shipbuilding Corporation. Her keel was laid on 28 October 1944. She was launched on 5 December and delivered on 21 December. She was driven ashore at Deal, United Kingdom on 28 August 1946. She was scrapped at Portland, Oregon in November 1964.

== James H. Robinson ==
James H. Robinson was built by California Shipbuilding Corporation. Her keel was laid on 11 July 1943. She was launched as James H. Robinson on 31 July and delivered as Samsteel on 15 August. To the MoWT under Lend-Lease. Operated under the management of Union-Castle Mail Steamship Co. Returned to USMC in 1947, officially renamed James H. Robinson. Laid up at Mobile as Samsteel. She was scrapped at Panama City, Florida in December 1961.

== James I. McKay ==
James I. McKay was built by North Carolina Shipbuilding Company. Her keel was laid on 1 July 1943. She was launched on 31 July and delivered on 8 August. Built for the WSA, she was operated under the management of United States Navigation Co. Transferred to the United States War Department in 1946, then loaned to the Chinese Government. Renamed Hai Ten and operated under the management of China Merchants Steam Navigation Company. Sold to the Chinese Government in 1947, then sold to her managers. Sold in 1955 to Vegas Steamship Corp., Monrovia and renamed Maria Theresa. Operated under the management of Barber Steamship Lines. Re-registered to Greece in 1959. Management transferred to N. & J. Vlassopoulos Ltd. in 1960. Sold in 1965 to First Freighters Ltd., Johannesburg, South Africa in 1967 and renamed Ingrid Anne. She was scrapped at Mukaishima, Japan in December 1967.

== James Iredell ==
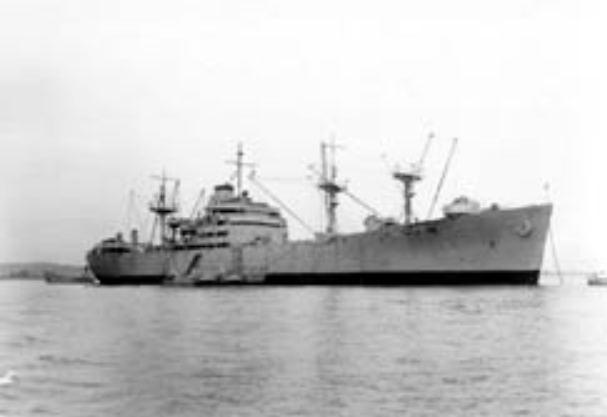
James Iredell

James Iredell was built by North Carolina Shipbuilding Company. Her keel was laid on 25 October 1942. She was launched on 29 November and delivered on 12 December. Built for the WSA, she was operated under the management of Agwilines Inc. Damaged in June 1943 when another ship was torpedoed and exploded whilst she was on a voyage from the United States to Sicily. She was beached at Palermo, Sicily, where minor repairs were made. Damaged in an air raid on Naples on 27 October 1943. She caught fire and was abandoned. The fire was extinguished on 30 October. Emergency repairs were made enabling her to sail to New York for permanent repairs. Damaged by weather in March 1944 and put in to Halifax, Dominion of Canada. Temporary repairs made and she sailed to the United Kingdom. Sunk as part of Gooseberry 2 off Saint-Laurent, France on 8 June 1944. Declared a total loss on 16 July following storms between 19 and 22 June destroyed the harbour.

== James Ives ==
James Ives was built by Permanente Metals Corporation. Her keel was laid on 16 February 1943. She was launched on 18 March and delivered on 31 March. Built for the WSA, she was operated under the management of Isthmian Steamship Company. Sold in 1947 to Livanos Maritime Co., Piraeus, Greece and renamed Axios. Sold in 1954 to D. Gioulis & A. Demades. Operated under the management of Livanos. Sold in 1965 to Axios Special Maritime Co., remaining under the same management. She was scrapped at Kaohsiung in February 1967.

== James Jackson ==
James Jackson was built by Southeastern Shipbuilding Corporation. Her keel was laid on 4 June 1942. She was launched on 27 December and delivered on 18 March 1943. Laid up at Mobile post-war, she was scrapped at Mobil in June 1973.

== James J. Corbett ==
James J. Corbett was built by Permanente Metals Corporation. Her keel was laid on 12 April 1943. She was launched on 8 May and delivered on 20 May. She was scrapped at Panama City, Florida in July 1964.

== James J. Hill ==
James J. Hill was built by Permanente Metals Corporation. Her keel was laid on 15 August 1942. She was launched on 25 September and delivered on 19 October. Laid up in the James River post-war, she was sold to shipbreakers in Cleveland, Ohio in January 1973.

== James J. O'Kelly ==
James J. O'Kelly was built by Permanente Metals Corporation. Her keel was laid on 26 August 1943. She was launched on 19 September and delivered on 29 September. Built for the WSA, she was operated under the management of American-Hawaiian Steamship Company. Management transferred to J. H. Winchester & Co. in 1946. Sold later that year to Los Bros. & A. K. Pezas, Chios, Greece. Operated under the management of Livanos & Co. Renamed Costis Los in 1947. Sold in 1949 to Constantine M. Los, Chios. Operated under the management of Nomikos. Sold in 1955 to West Africa Navigation Ltd. and renamed African King. Re-registered to Liberia and operated under the management of Verrando & Co. She was scrapped at Onahama in May 1964.

== James J. Pettigrew ==
James J. Pettigrew was built by North Carolina Shipbuilding Company. Her keel was laid on 24 November 1942. She was launched on 24 December and delivered on 7 January 1943. She was scrapped at Baltimore in May 1960.

== James Kerney ==
James Kerney was built by Bethlehem Fairfield Shipyard. Her keel was laid on 30 March 1944. She was launched on 29 April and delivered on 19 May. Built for the WSA, she was operated under the management of A. L. Burbank & Co. Sold in 1947 to Weyerhauser Steamship Co. and renamed F. E. Weyerhauser. Sold in 1968 to Reliance Carriers and renamed Reliance Unity. Re-registered to Panama and operated under the management of Hongkong Maritime Co. Sold in 1970 to Eastern Supplier Partnership and renamed Eastern Supplier Operated under the management of Eastern Sea Services. Sold in 1973 to International Offshore Operators & Ocean Services Inc. She was scrapped at Kaohsiung in July 1973.

== James K. Kelly ==
James K. Kelly was built by Oregon Shipbuilding Corporation. Her keel was laid on 30 June 1943. She was launched on 20 July and delivered on 27 July. She was scrapped at Panama City, Florida in June 1963.

== James King ==
James King was built by Permanente Metals Corporation. Her keel was laid on 13 October 1943. She was launched on 31 October and delivered on 9 November. She was scrapped at Portland, Oregon in November 1961.

== James K. Paulding ==
James K. Paulding was built by St. Johns River Shipbuilding Company. Her keel was laid on 30 March 1944. She was launched on 12 May and delivered on 30 May. She was scrapped at New Orleans in November 1964.

== James K. Polk ==
James K. Polk was built by North Carolina Shipbuilding Company. Her keel was laid on 8 June 1942. She was launched on 2 August and delivered on 21 August. Built for the WSA, she was operated under the management of American South African Line. Torpedoed and damaged in the Atlantic Ocean off Dutch Guiana by U-510 on 9 March 1943 whilst on a voyage from Suez, Egypt to Paramaribo, Dutch Guiana. She was towed to a port in Trinidad. Towed to Mobile in December 1945 and laid up, having been declared a constructive total loss. She was scrapped in the United States in 1946.

== James Kyron Walker ==
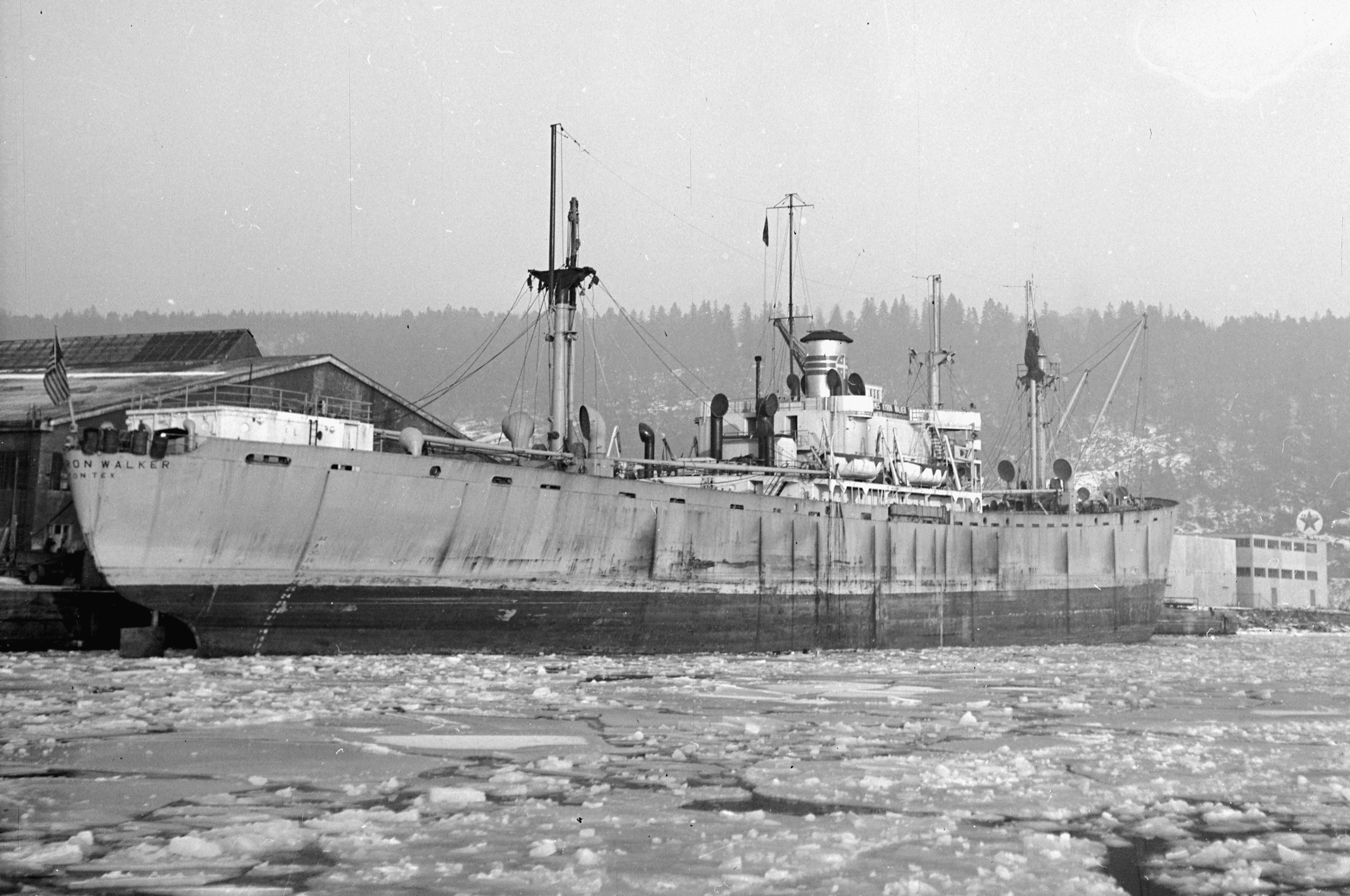
James Kyron Walker in Oslo, 1947

James Kyron Walker was built by Todd Houston Shipbuilding Corporation. Her keel was laid on 13 November 1944. She was launched on 15 December and delivered on 23 December. Laid up in the James River post-war, she was reactivated several times during the 1950s and 1960s for the grain program. She finally arrived at Burriana (Spain) in February 1973 for scrapping.

== James L. Ackerson ==
James L. Ackerson was built by St. Johns River Shipbuilding Company. Her keel was laid on 1 January 1944. She was launched on 29 February and delivered on 16 March. Built for the WSA, she was operated under the management of Wessel, Duval & Co. Sold in 1947 to Stavros J. Niarchos, Piraeus and renamed Captain J. Matarangas. Operated under the management of Simpson, Spence & Young. Sold in 1950 to Tropis Co. Ltd., Piraeus. Renamed Artemis in 1952, placed under the management of Carras Ltd. in 1954. Management transferred to Interocean Tramping Ltd. in 1961, then to Carris Ltd. in 1965. She was scrapped at Ikedo, Japan in March 1967.

== James L. Breck ==
James L. Breck was built by Oregon Shipbuilding Corporation. Her keel was laid on 14 August 1943. She was launched on 1 September and delivered on 9 September. She was scrapped at Hirao in July 1960.

== James Lick ==
James Lick was built by Permanente Metals Corporation. Her keel was laid on 24 July 1943. She was launched on 19 August and delivered on 29 August. Built for the WSA, she was operated under the management of Matson Navigation Co. Laid up in 1946, she was placed under the management of Coastwise Line in 1948 and sold to them the next year. Sold in 1956 to United Vintners Lines, San Francisco and re-registered to Liberia. Sold in 1957 to Zeeland Transportation Co. and renamed Wang Trader. Operated under the management of North Atlantic Marine Co. Sold in 1958 to Rockland Steamship Corp. and re-registered to the United States. Renamed Rockland in 1959. Sold in 1960 to Caroline Navigation Inc. and renamed Giannis. Re-registered to Greece and operated under the management of Ceres Shipping Enterprises. She ran aground 3 nautical miles (5.6 km) off Ohara, Japan (35°10′N 140°23′E) on 13 June 1963 whilst on a voyage from San Francisco to a Japanese port. She broke in two on 13 July and was declared a total loss. The stern section was refloated on 13 July and towed in to Tateyama. It was towed to Yokosuka on 19 July and subsequently scrapped there.

== James Longstreet ==
James Longstreet was built by Todd Houston Shipbuilding Corporation. Her keel was laid on 24 August 1942. She was launched on 31 October and delivered on 20 November. Built for the WSA, she was operated under the management of International Freighting Corp. She was driven ashore at Sandy Hook, New Jersey on 26 October 1943 whilst on a voyage from Southampton to New York. She began to break in two. Temporary repairs were made and she was refloated on 25 November and towed to New York. Declared a constructive total loss, she was scheduled for breaking but was acquired by the United States Navy in June 1944. Used in experiments testing Bat and Pelican guided bombs. Scuttled as a target ship off Eastham, Massachusetts on 24 April 1945. Her wreck remained in situ in 1985.

== James Madison ==
James Madison was built by Todd Houston Shipbuilding Corporation. Her keel was laid on 28 October 1942. She was launched on 21 December and delivered on 6 January 1943. She was scrapped at Oakland, California in May 1966.

== James Manning ==
James Manning was built by New England Shipbuilding Corporation. Her keel was laid on 13 October 1943. She was launched on 28 November and delivered on 8 December. She was scrapped at Beaumont in March 1961.

== James McCosh ==
James McCosh was built by Bethlehem Fairfield Shipyard. Her keel was laid on 8 May 1943. She was launched on 2 June and delivered on 15 June. Laid up in the James River post-war, she was sold to Dutch buyers in October 1972. Resold, she arrived at Bilbao on 21 November 1972 for scrapping.

== James McHenry ==
James McHenry was built by Delta Shipbuilding Company. Her keel was laid on 16 January 1943. She was launched on 4 March and delivered on 20 March. Laid up in Puget Sound post-war, she was scrapped at Tacoma in August 1970.

== James M. Clements ==
James M. Clements was built by Oregon Shipbuilding Corporation. Her keel was laid on 7 August 1943. She was launched on 26 August and delivered on 2 September. She was scrapped at Terminal Island in January 1960.

== James McNeill Whistler ==
James McNeill Whistler was built by Oregon Shipbuilding Corporation. Her keel was laid on 31 August 1942. She was launched on 30 September and delivered on 11 October. She ran aground at Meshima, 90 nautical miles (170 km) south west of Nagasaki, Japan on 19 June 1946 whilst carrying 3,400 Japanese repatriates from Shanghai to a Japanese port. All on board were rescued. She was declared a total loss.

== James M. Gilliss ==
James M. Gilliss was built by Bethlehem Fairfield Shipyard. Her keel was laid on 16 June 1943. She was launched on 10 August and delivered on 18 August. She was scrapped at Panama City, Florida in November 1962.

== James M. Goodhue ==
James M. Goodhue was built by California Shipbuilding Corporation. Her keel was laid on 15 February 1943. She was launched on 15 March and delivered on 30 March. Built for the WSA, she was operated under the management of American West African Line. Sold in 1947 to Kulukundis & Mavroleon and renamed Captain Farmakides. Re-registered to Greece and operated under the management of Rethymnis & Kulukundis. Renamed Pytheas in 1961. Sold in 1962 to Armonia Compania Navigation, Panama. Remained registered in Greece, and operated under the management of Dynamic Shipping Inc. Sprang a leak on 2 January 1966 whilst on a voyage from Göcek, Turkey to Baltimore. She was beached at Aghios Minas, Rhodes and was abandoned as a total loss.

== James Monroe ==
James Monroe was built by California Shipbuilding Corporation. Her keel was laid on 4 February 1942. She was launched on 27 April and delivered on 3 June. Laid up at Mobile post-war, she was scrapped at Panama City, Florida in November 1970.

== James Moore ==
James Moore was a limited troop carrier built by North Carolina Shipbuilding Company. Her keel was laid on 21 January 1943. She was launched on 19 February and delivered on 27 February. Built for the WSA, she was operated under the management of Dichmann, Wright & Pugh. To the French Government in 1947 and renamed Sein. Operated under the management of Compagnie Générale Transatlantique. Sold in 1961 to Zim Israel Navigation Co., Haifa, Israel and renamed Velos. New diesel engine fitted in 1962 by Ateliers et Chantiers de Bretagne, Nantes, France. Sold in 1964 to Pagan Steamship Corp., Nassau, Bahamas and renamed Fede. Re-registered to the United Kingdom. Sold in 1966 to Petroleum Tankers Inc. Re-registered to Liberia and operated under the management of E. Haymann. Sold in 1967 to Astrocredo Compania Navigation, Panama. Remaining registered in Greece, and operated under the management of Pateras Bros. Sold in 1970 to Nicmar Shipping Co., Famagusta and renamed Arosa. She was scrapped at Split in January 1972.

== James M. Porter ==
James M. Porter was built by Todd Houston Shipbuilding Corporation. Her keel was laid on 8 January 1943. She was launched on 28 February and delivered on 14 March. She was scrapped at Bellingham, Washington in October 1961.

== James M. Wayne ==
James M. Wayne was built by J. A. Jones Construction Company, Brunswick. Her keel was laid on 6 July 1942. She was launched on 13 March 1943 and delivered on 7 May. She was scrapped at Kearny in June 1967.

== James Oglethorpe ==
James Oglethorpe was built by Southeastern Shipbuilding Corporation. She was delivered in February 1943. Built for the WSA, she was operated under the management of South Atlantic Steamship Co. Torpedoed and damaged in the Atlantic Ocean by U-758 on 16 March 1943 whilst on a voyage from New York to Liverpool, United Kingdom. She put back for Saint John's, Canada but was torpedoed and sunk the next day (50°38′N 34°36′W) by U-91.

== James Oliver ==
James Oliver was built by Oregon Shipbuilding Corporation. Her keel was laid on 28 April 1943. She was launched on 18 May and delivered on 26 May. She was scrapped at Panama City, Florida in October 1967.

== James Oliver Curwood ==
James Oliver Curwood was built by Permanente Metals Corporation. Her keel was laid on 21 November 1943. She was launched on 10 December and delivered on 18 December. Built for the WSA, she was operated under the management of United States Lines. Transferred to the United States War in 1946. Sold in 1947 to Navigazione Libera Giuliana, Italy and renamed Nazario Sauro. Sold in 1963 to the Polish Government and renamed Huga Zygmunt. Operated under the management of Polska Żegluga Morska. Converted in 1967 to a floating grain store at Szczecin. She was scrapped at Szczecin in 1969.

== James Otis ==
James Otis was built by Permanente Metals Corporation. Her keel was laid on 17 September 1941. She was launched on 31 December and delivered on 23 February 1942. Built for the WSA, she was operated under the management of States Steamship Co. She ran aground at Prawle Point, United Kingdom on 6 February 1945 whilst on a voyage from New York to Southampton. She was refloated and towed in to Plymouth. Towed to Falmouth on 14 April, declared a constructive total loss. Transferred to the United States Army. Scuttled at sea on 26 August 1946 with a cargo of obsolete ammunition.

== James Robertson ==
James Robertson was built by California Shipbuilding Corporation. Her keel was laid on 29 December 1942. She was launched on 26 January 1943 and delivered on 11 February. Built for the WSA, she was operated under the management of American President Lines. Torpedoed and damaged off Fortaleza, Brazil (4°05′S 35°58′W) by U-185 on 7 July 1943 whilst on a voyage from Durban to Paramaribo. She sank the next day.

== James Rolph ==
James Rolph was built by Permanente Metals Corporation. Her keel was laid on 7 November 1943. She was launched on 26 November and delivered on 4 December. Built for the WSA, she was operated under the management of Agwilines Inc. Sold in 1947 to Compagnia di Navigazione Giuseppe Mazzini, Genoa and renamed Spiga. Sold in 1963 to Sovtorgflot and renamed Ala-Tau. She was deleted from shipping registers in 1967 and scrapped at Split in December 1970.

== James Rowan ==
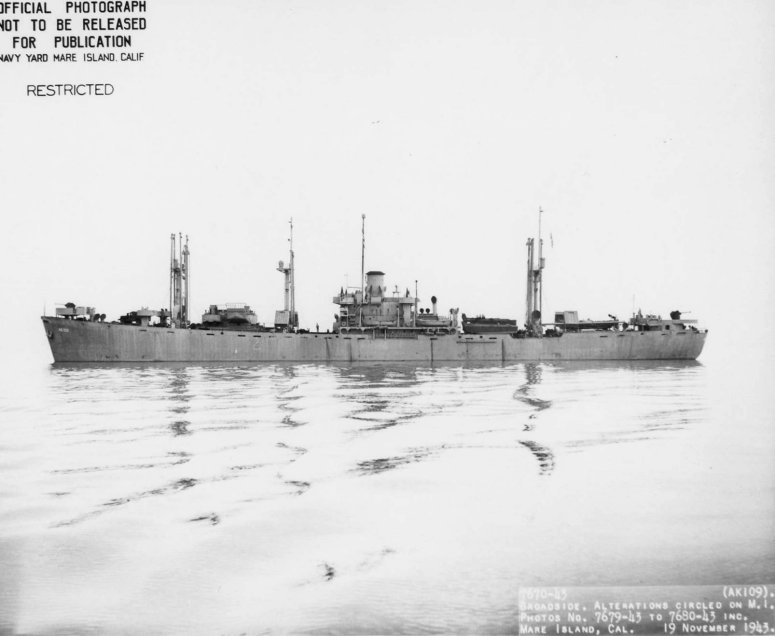
USS Allioth

James Rowan was built by Permanente Metals Corporation. Her keel was laid on 30 July 1943. She was launched on 20 August and delivered on 31 August. To the United States Navy in October 1943 and renamed Allioth. Laid up in reserve in May 1946. Returned to USMC in May 1947 and renamed James Rowan. Laid up in the James River. She was scrapped at Kearny in May 1965.

== James Roy Wells ==
James Roy Wells was built by Todd Houston Shipbuilding Corporation. Her keel was laid on 25 November 1944. She was launched on 3 January 1945 and delivered on 13 January. Built for the WSA, she was operated under the management of American Foreign Steamship Corp. Sold in 1951 to Transpacific Navigation Corp., New York and renamed Seapioneer. Sold in 1952 to Pedegral Compania Navigation, Panama and renamed Lamyra. Operated under the management of Goulandris Ltd. Sold in 1962 to Cosmos Shipping Corp., Hong Kong and renamed Cosmos Betelgeuse. Remaining registered in Panama. Placed under the management of Marine Industry Corp. in 1963. She was scrapped at Kaohsiung in February 1968.

== James R. Randall ==
James R. Randall was built by Bethlehem Fairfield Shipyard. Her keel was laid on 1 April 1943. She was launched on 2 May and delivered on 26 May. She was scrapped at Mobile in September 1965.

== James Rumsey ==
James Rumsey was built by Permanente Metals Corporation. Her keel was laid on 8 August 1942. She was launched on 19 September and delivered on 30 September. She ran aground at San Salvador (27°00′N 77°30′W) on 14 May 1946 whilst on a voyage from Savannah to Santos, Brazil. She was refloated and towed to Mayport, Florida. Declared a constructive total loss, she was scrapped at Baltimore in December 1947.

== James Russell Lowell ==
James Russell Lowell was built by Oregon Shipbuilding Corporation. Her keel was laid on 19 February 1942. She was launched on 12 April and delivered on 9 May. Built for the WSA, she was operated under the management of McCormick Steamship Company. She was torpedoed and damaged in the Mediterranean Sea off the coast of Algeria by U-371 on 15 October 1943 and beached near Philippeville. Declared a constructive total loss. She subsequently broke in two. The bow section was taken under tow for Anzio, Italy on 4 January 1953. It was cast adrift due to weather conditions on 6 January, and sunk by Royal Navy warships south of Pantellaria, Italy (36°17′N 12°23′E) on 12 January as it was a danger to navigation. The stern section was taken in tow on 29 March 1953 and subsequently scrapped at an Italian port.

== James Schureman ==
James Schureman was built by California Shipbuilding Corporation. Her keel was laid on 22 March 1942. She was launched on 23 May and delivered on 20 June. She was scrapped at Baltimore in April 1962.

== James Screven ==
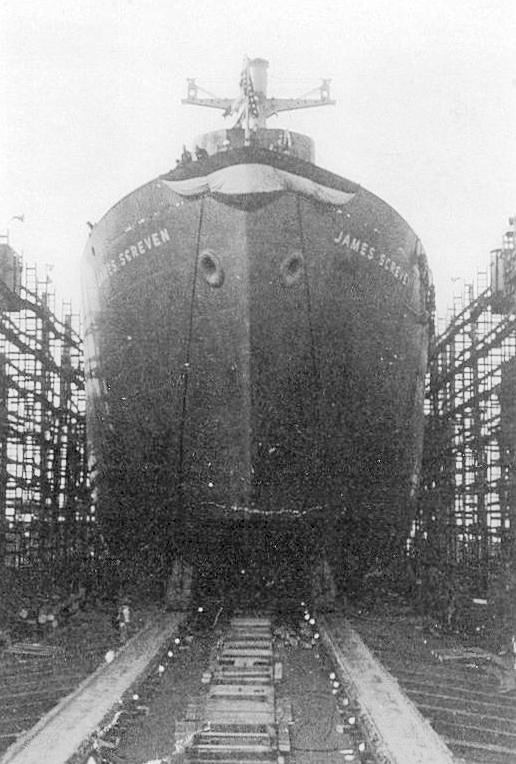
The launch of James Screven

James Screven was built by St. Johns River Shipbuilding Company. Named for brigadier general James Screven, her keel was laid on 4 October 1943. She was launched on 23 November and delivered on 4 December. To the United States Navy and renamed Shaula. Converted for naval use by Gibbs Gas Engine Co., Jacksonville. Returned to WSA in June 1946 and renamed James Screven. Laid up in reserve. Sold in 1947 to Achille Lauro, Rome and renamed Olimpia. Used as a passenger ship until 1951. She was scrapped at La Spezia in January 1969.

== James Shields ==
James Shields was built by California Shipbuilding Corporation. Her keel was laid on 13 May 1943. She was launched on 5 June and delivered on 18 June. Laid up in the James River post-war, she was scrapped at Philadelphia in June 1971.

== James S. Hogg ==
James S. Hogg was built by Todd Houston Shipbuilding Corporation. Her keel was laid on 8 March 1943. She was launched on 23 April and delivered on 12 May. To United States Navy in November 1943 and renamed Pavo. Converted for naval service at Terminal Island. Returned to WSA in December 1945 and renamed James S. Hogg. Laid up in the James River. She was scrapped at Bilbao in June 1972.

== James S. Lawson ==
James S. Lawson was built by Oregon Shipbuilding Corporation. Her keel was laid on 24 August 1943. She was launched on 9 September and delivered on 16 September. She was scrapped at Kearny in April 1969.

== James Smith ==
James Smith was built by Permanente Metals Corporation. Her keel was laid on 15 April 1942. She was launched on 4 July and delivered on 22 July. Built for the WSA, she was operated under the management of Matson Navigation Co. Torpedoed and damaged in the Atlantic Ocean by U-510 on 9 March 1943 whilst on a voyage from Bahia, Brazil to Trinidad. Although declared beyond salvage, she was taken in tow for Trinidad the next day. Subsequently towed to New Orleans and repaired. On 23 September 1943, she discovered German submarine U-260 on the surface whilst in a convoy. She sank the U-boat with HMS Itchen and HMCS Morden. She was scrapped at Panama City, Florida in February 1963.

== James Sprunt ==
James Sprunt was built by North Carolina Shipbuilding Company. Her keel was laid on 5 January 1943. She was launched on 3 February and delivered on 13 February. Built for the WSA, she was operated under the management of Black Diamond Steamship Company. She was torpedoed by U-185 south east of Cuba (19°49′N 74°38′W) on 10 March 1943 whilst on a voyage from Charleston, South Carolina to Karachi, India. She exploded and sank.

== James Sullivan ==
James Sullivan was built by New England Shipbuilding Corporation. Her keel was laid on 23 May 1944. She was launched on 13 July and delivered on 26 July. She was scrapped at Kearny in August 1965.

== James Swan ==
James Swan was built by Southeastern Shipbuilding Corporation. Her keel was laid on 23 June 1944. She was launched on 12 August and delivered on 24 August. Built for the WSA, she was operated under the management of South Atlantic Steamship Line. Sold in 1951 to Standard Steamship Co., Dover, Delaware and renamed Quartette. Ran aground on the Pearl and Hermes reef, 90 nautical miles (170 km) east of Midway Island on 21 December 1952 whilst on a voyage from Baltimore to Pusan, Korea. She broke in two and was declared a total loss.

== James T. Earle ==
James T. Earle was built by Bethlehem Fairfield Shipyard. Her keel was laid on 3 August 1943. She was launched at James T. Earle on 31 August and delivered as Samaye on 8 September. To the MoWT under Lend-Lease. Operated under the management of Cayzer, Irvine & Co. Management transferred to Thomas Dunlop & Sons in 1946. Sold in 1947 to Queen Line & Cadogan Steamship Co. Ltd. and renamed Queen Victoria, remaining under the same management. Sold in 1948 to Charente Steamship Co. and renamed Historian. Operated under the management of T. & J. Harrison. Sold in 1962 to Jayanti Shipping Co., London and Bombay and renamed Parvati Jayanti. Re-registered to India. Damaged by Israeli shellfire at Suez on 6 September 1967. Subsequently repaired. She ran aground at Azemmour, Morocco on 22 February 1968 whilst on a voyage from Alexandria, Egypt to Bombay. She was refloated the next day and taken in to Casablanca, Morocco in a severely damaged condition. She was scrapped at Avilés, Spain in April 1968.

== James T. Fields ==
James T. Fields was built by New England Shipbuilding Corporation. Her keel was laid on 17 August 1944. She was launched on 3 October and delivered on 19 October. She was scrapped at Tacoma in June 1970.

== James Turner ==
James Turner was built by North Carolina Shipbuilding Company. Her keel was laid on 26 July 1942. She was launched on 29 September and delivered on 10 October. She was scrapped at Kearny in April 1970.

== James W. Cannon ==
James W. Cannon was built by J. A. Jones Construction Company, Brunswick. Her keel was laid on 25 May 1944. She was launched on 12 July and delivered on 26 July. Built for the WSA, she was operated under the management of International Freighting Corp. Management transferred to Isthmian Steamship Co. in 1946, then to Coastwise Line in 1948. Sold in 1951 to Pancargo Shipping Corp. and renamed Transoceanic. Operated under the management of National Shipping & Trading Corp. Renamed National Mariner in 1954. Sold in 1956 to Pan Cargo Shipping Corp. Sold in 1961 to Hellenic Shipping & Industries Ltd., Piraeus and renamed Vorios Ipiros. She was scrapped at Yokosuka in March 1963.

== James W. Denver ==
James W. Denver was built by Bethlehem Fairfield Shipyard. Her keel was laid on 20 January 1943. She was launched on 27 February and delivered on 13 March. Built for the WSA, she was operated under the management of Calmar Steamship Company. Torpedoed and sunk in the Atlantic Ocean west of the Canary Islands (28°46′N 25°40′W) by U-195 on 11 April 1943 whilst on a voyage from Baltimore to a port in the north of Africa.

== James W. Fannin ==
James W. Fannin was a limited troop carrier built by Todd Houston Shipbuilding Corporation. Her keel was laid on 30 March 1943. She was launched on 12 May and delivered on 27 May. Built for the WSA, she was operated under the management of American South African Line. To the French Government in 1946. Operated under the management of Compagnie Générale Transatlantique. Renamed St. Malo in 1947. Sold in 1961 to Compania Santa Kalliopi, Panama and renamed Tegean. Operated under the management of Wigham, Richardson & Co. She ran aground on the Sister Rocks, 16 nautical miles (30 km) south of Halifax, Canada (42°47′N 63°32′W) on 28 November 1966 whilst on a voyage from Glasgow, United Kingdom to an American port. She broke in two on 20 December and was a total loss.

== James W. Grimes ==
James W. Grimes was built by Oregon Shipbuilding Corporation. Her keel was laid on 3 March 1943. She was launched on 24 March and delivered on 31 March. Laid up in the James River post-war, she was sold to shipbreakers in Philadelphia in December 1972.

== James W. Johnson ==
James W. Johnson

James W. Johnson was built by California Shipbuilding Corporation. Her keel was laid on 15 November 1943. She was launched on 12 December and delivered on 30 December. Laid up in the Hudson River post-war, she was scrapped at Gandia in January 1971.

== James W. Marshall ==
James W. Marshall was built by California Shipbuilding Corporation. Her keel was laid on 15 October 1942. She was launched on 16 November and delivered on 5 December. Built for the WSA, she was operated under the management of McCormick Steamship Company. Bombed and damaged in the Mediterranean Sea off Salerno, Italy on 13 September 1943 whilst on a voyage from Bizerta, Tunisia to Salerno, then bombed and further damaged on 15 September. She was towed to Bizerta, where temporary repairs were made. Scuttled as part of Gooseberry 2 on 8 June 1944. Abandoned as a total loss on 16 July following storms from 19 to 22 June.

== James W. Nesmith ==
James W. Nesmith was built by Oregon Shipbuilding Corporation. Her keel was laid on 8 June 1942. She was launched on 21 July and delivered on 31 July. Built for the WSA, she was operated under the management of McCormick Steamship Company. Torpedoed and damaged in the Irish Sea by U-1024 on 7 April 1945 and was beached at Holyhead, United Kingdom. She was refloated and towed to Liverpool, where she was declared a constructive total loss. Towed to the River Blackwater on 29 August and laid up. Transferred to the United States War Department on 3 June 1946. She was scuttled at sea with a cargo of obsolete ammunition on that date.

== James W. Nye ==
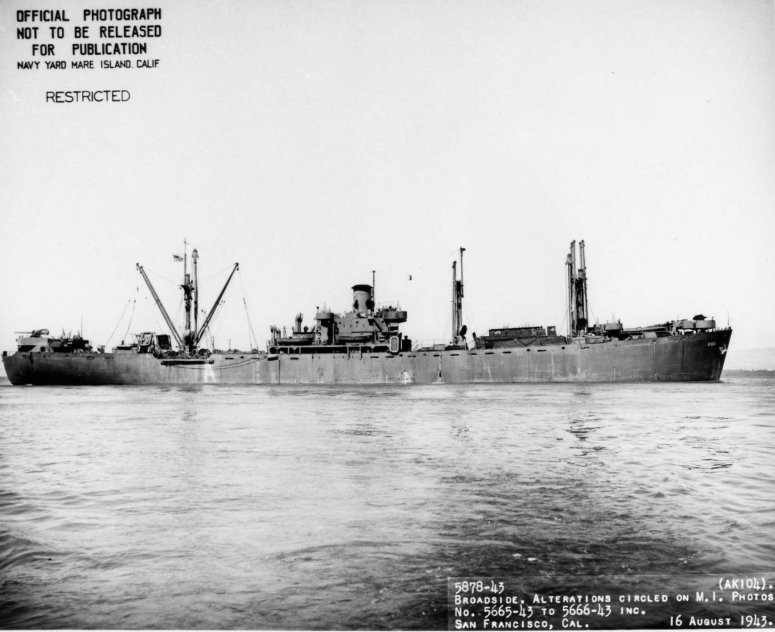
USS Ganymede

James W. Nye was built by Permanente Metals Corporation. Her keel was laid on 16 May 1943. She was launched on 8 June and delivered on 23 June. To the United States Navy and renamed Ganymede. Decommissioned at Pearl Harbor, Hawaii in April 1946, then towed to San Francisco. Returned to USMC in October 1947 and renamed James W. Nye. Laid up in Suisun Bay. She was scrapped at Kaohsiung in March 1973.

== James W. Wheeler ==
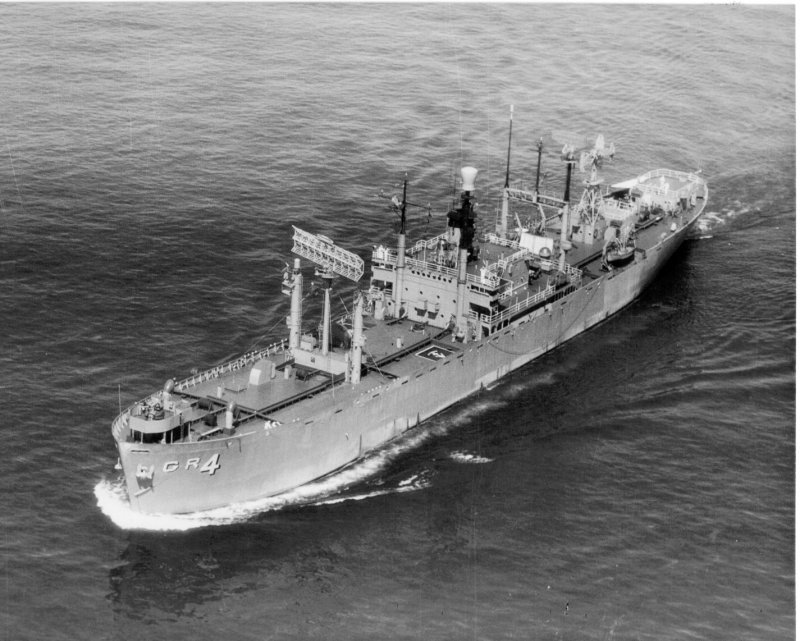
USS Searcher

James W. Wheeler was a boxed aircraft transport ship built by J. A. Jones Construction Co., Panama City. Her keel was laid on 11 December 1944. She was launched on 23 January 1945 and delivered on 5 February. Laid up in reserve post-war. To United States Navy in September 1954 and renamed Searcher. Converted for naval use at Charleston Naval Shipyard. Placed in reserve in July 1965 and laid up in the Hudson River. Sold to shipbreakers in Wilmington, Delaware in August 1970.

== James Whitcomb Riley ==
James Whitcomb Riley was built by Oregon Shipbuilding Corporation. Her keel was laid on 5 March 1942. She was launched on 23 April and delivered on 17 May. Laid up in the Hudson River post-war, she was scrapped at Kearny in May 1971.

== James Wilson ==
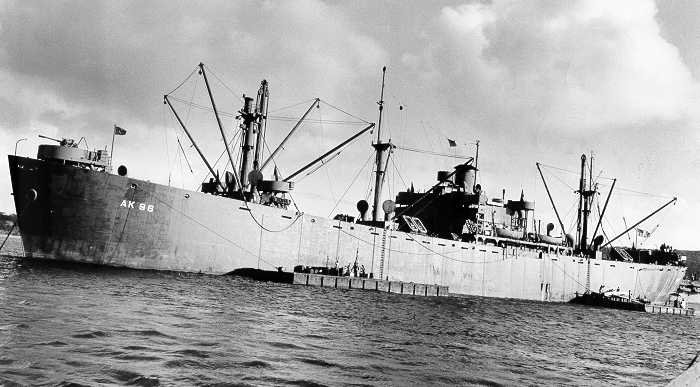
USS Sterope

James Wilson was built by Oregon Shipbuilding Corporation. Her keel was laid on 9 December 1941. She was launched on 22 February 1942 and delivered on 11 April. Built for the WSA. To the United States Navy in March 1943. Converted for naval use by Los Angeles Shipbuilding and Drydock Co. Laid up in reserve at Pearl Harbor in April 1946. Returned to USMC in August 1947. Towed to San Francisco and laid up in Suisun Bay. She was scrapped at Oakland in November 1964.

== James Withycombe ==
James Withycombe was built by Oregon Shipbuilding Corporation. Her keel was laid on 8 June 1943. She was launched on 28 June and delivered on 6 July. Built for the WSA, she was operated under the management of Sudden & Christensen. She ran aground off Margarita Point, Panama (8°58′N 79°32′W) on 19 December 1943 whilst on a voyage from Galveston, Texas to Melbourne, Australia. She broke in two and was abandoned as a total loss.

== James Woodrow ==
James Woodrow was built by Bethlehem Fairfield Shipyard. Her keel was laid on 26 November 1942. She was launched on 9 January 1943 and delivered on 19 January. She stuck a coral reef in the Pacific Ocean in January 1946. She was towed to Suisun Bay, where she was declared a constructive total loss and laid up. She was scrapped at Terminal Island in June 1954.

== Jan Pieterszoon Coen ==
Jan Pieterszoon Coen was built by Permanente Metals Corporation. Her keel was laid on 6 Januaryb 1944. She was launched on 28 January and delivered on 10 March. Built for the WSA, she was operated under the management of Sudden & Christensen. Sold in 1947 to Lorentzens Skibs A/S, Oslo and renamed Sally Stove. Operated under the management of Lorentzens Rederi Co. Re-engined in 1954 with a FIAT diesel engine that increased her speed to 12.5 knots (23.2 km/h). Sold in 1960 to Compania Atlantica Pacifica S.A., Monrovia and renamed Susquehanna. Operated under the management of Alberto Ravano. Sold in 1961 to Compania Atlantica Pacifica S.A., Panama. Sold in 1963 to Neptune Marine Corp., Monrovia and renamed Neptune. Operated under the management of Culny Inc. Management transferred to Union Marine Industry Inc. in 1964. Sold in 1967 to Oriental Union Maritime Corp., Monrovia. Sold in 1968 to Global Transport Service Corp., Monrovia. She arrived at Kaohsiung on 4 March 1968 for scrapping.

== Jane Addams ==
Jane Addams was built by California Shipbuilding Corporation. Her keel was laid on 15 July 1942. She was launched on 22 August and delivered on 10 September. She was sold for scrapping in March 1969, but was resold and converted to a floating wharf for use at Portland, Oregon.

== Jane A. Delano ==
Jane A. Delano was built by Permanente Metals Corporation. Her keel was laid on 19 January 1943. She was launched on 9 March and delivered on 20 March. She was scrapped at Panama City, Florida in March 1970.

== Jane G. Swisshelm ==
Jane G. Swisshelm was built by Oregon Shipbuilding Corporation. Her keel was laid on 20 October 1943. She was launched on 18 November and delivered on 28 November. She was scrapped at Mobile in October 1967.

== Jane Long ==
Jane Long was built by Todd Houston Shipbuilding Corporation. Her keel was laid on 17 March 1943. She was launched on 30 April and delivered on 17 May. Laid up in the James River post-war. Sold in December 1972 to Dutch shipbreakers. Resold and renamed Roem II. Broke free from tow by the tug Seetrans 200 nautical miles (370 km) east of Norfolk, Virginia on 3 February 1973. Subsequently, taken in tow by a United States Coast Guard vessel. She arrived at Bilbao on 2 April 1973 for scrapping.

== Janet Lord Roper ==
Janet Lord Roper was built by Bethlehem Fairfield Shipyard. Her keel was laid on 25 May 1943. She was launched on 26 June and delivered on 8 July. Built for the WSA, she was operated under the management of International Freighting Corp. Laid up in 1946, she was sold in 1948 to Sprague Steamship Co. and renamed P. W. Sprague. Shortened at Boston in May 1948 and converted to a self-unloading collier. Now 411 feet 0 inches (125.27 m) long overall, and 6,048 GRT. Sold in 1956 to Ponce Products Inc. and renamed Florida State. Converted to a self-unloading bulk cement carrier, now 6,278 GRT. Sold in 1961 to Everglades Steamship Corp., Port Everglades, Florida. Converted to a bulk carrier at Tampa in 1968. Sold in 1971 to Galeana SA, Athens. Re-registered to Panama. Converted to a non-propelled barge in Venezuela in 1977.

== Jared Ingersoll ==
Jared Ingersoll was built by Bethlehem Fairfield Shipyard. Her keel was laid on 24 June 1942. She was launched on 15 August and delivered on 25 August. Built for the WSA, she was operated under the management of American West African Line. Torpedoed by aircraft and damaged in the Mediterranean Sea 45 nautical miles (83 km) north west of Algiers on 1 April 1944 whilst on a voyage from Charleston to the Persian Gulf. She caught fire and exploded and was abandoned by her crew. She was subsequently towed to Algiers and beached. Subsequently repaired. Laid up post-war, she was scrapped at Wilmington, Delaware in August 1964.

== Jason Lee ==
Jason Lee was built by Oregon Shipbuilding Corporation. Her keel was laid on 16 May 1942. She was launched on 27 June and delivered on 9 July. She was scrapped at Oakland in March 1967.

== Jasper F. Cropsey ==
Jasper F. Cropsey was built by St Johns River Shipbuilding Company. Her keel was laid on 19 May 1944. She was launched on 30 June and delivered on 20 July. Built for the WSA, she was operated under the management of United States Navigation Co., New York. Sold in 1948 to United States Navigation Co., Wilmington, North Carolina and New York. Sold later that year to Panoceanic Steamship Corp. and placed under the management of Ocean Shipping & Trading Co. Renamed Oceanic in 1949. Sold in 1954 to Tramp Freighter Corp. and placed under the management of Polaris Steamship Co. Re-registered to Liberia in 1956. Placed under the management of Cargo Ships & Tankers Ltd., New York and re-registered to the United States. Sold in 1959 to Seatramp Inc. and re-registered to Liberia, remaining under the same management. Sold to her managers in 1961. Lengthened at Tokyo, Japan in 1961. Now 511 feet 6 inches (155.91 m) long and 8,312 GRT. Sold in 1966 to Hudson Waterways Corp. and placed under the management of Transeastern Associates Inc. Exchanged with the T2 tanker Cohocton in 1967 under the Ship Exchange Act. To the United States Department of Commerce. She was scrapped at La Spezia in November 1967.

== Jay Cooke ==
Jay Cooke was built by Permanente Metals Corporation. Her keel was laid on 21 May 1944. She was launched on 9 June and delivered on 17 June. To the Soviet Union and renamed General Vatutin. Renamed Miklukho-Maklai in 1966. Arrived at Vladivostok on 29 July 1975 for scrapping.

== J. C. Osgood ==
J. C. Osgood was built by Permanente Metals Corporation. Her keel was laid on 18 November 1943. She was launched on 7 December and delivered on 16 December. Built for the WSA, she was operated under the management of Matson Navigation Co. Sold in 1947 to Corrado Società Anonyme di Navigazione, Genoa and renamed Bianca Corrado. Sold in 1963 to Sovtorgflot, Odesa, Soviet Union and renamed Beshtau. She was scrapped at Castellón de la Plana, Spain in July 1970.

== J. C. W. Beckham ==
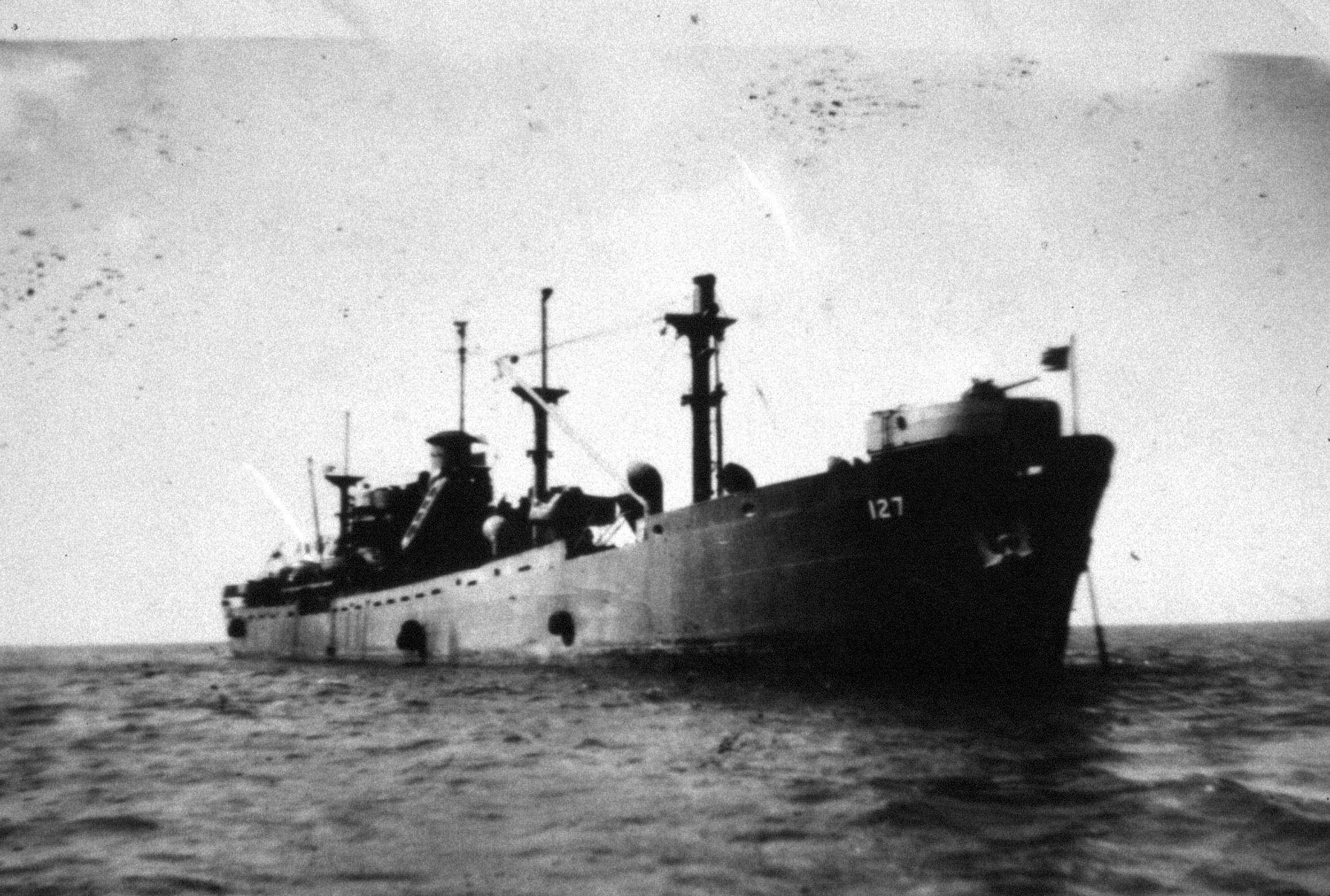
USS Raccoon

J. C. W. Beckham was a tanker built by Delta Shipbuilding Company. Her keel was laid as J. C. W. Beckham on 7 November 1943. She was launched as Raccoon on 23 December and delivered on 31 January 1944. Built for the United States Navy. Returned to the WSA in July 1946 and renamed J. C. W. Beckham. Sold in 1948 to Fordom Trading Corp', for International Shipping Corp., Tampa. Renamed Chrysanthstar later that year and operated under the management of Triton Shipping Inc. She collided with the British fishing boat Energetic 10 nautical miles (19 km) off The Lizard, United Kingdom on 25 June 1948. Energetic sank with the loss of five of her six crew. Sold in 1949 to Jupiter Steamship Corp. and renamed Jupiter. Converted to a cargo ship at Brooklyn, New York. Now 7,177 GRT. Renamed Searanger in 1951. Sold in 1953 to Nueva Granada Armadora and renamed Sariza. Re-registered to Panama and operated under the management of Goulandris Ltd. Sold in 1963 to Compania Navigation Continental and renamed Sara. Operated under the management of Ocean Shipping & Trading Co. Sold in 1965 to United Mariners Line, Hong Kong and renamed Asia Mariner. Re-registered to Liberia. She was scrapped at Kaohsiung in November 1968.

== J. D. Ross ==
J. D. Ross was built by Oregon Shipbuilding Corporation. Her keel was laid on 28 June 1943. She was launched on 18 July and delivered on 25 July. Built for the WSA, she was operated under the management of Pacific-Atlantic Steamship Corp. Sold in 1947 to Waterman Steamship Corporation, Mobile and renamed Governor Miller. Sold in 1949 to Marine Steamship Corp., New York and renamed Irenestar. Sold in 1956 to Traders Steamship Corp., New York. Sold in 1960 to Proteus Shipping Co. and renamed Lampsis. Re-registered to Greece and operated under the management of Triton Shipping Inc. She sprang a leak in the Atlantic Ocean on 11 January 1966 whilst on a voyage from Casablanca, Morocco to Philadelphia. She sank the next day 600 nautical miles (1,100 km) east north east of Bermuda (34°18′N 51°22′W).

== J. D. Yeager ==
J. D. Yeager was built by Todd Houston Shipbuilding Corporation, Houston, Texas. Her keel was laid on 30 August 1944. She was launched on 6 October and delivered on 16 October. She was scrapped at Kearny in April 1967.

== Jean Baptiste LeMoyne ==
Jean Baptiste LeMoyne was a tanker built by Delta Shipbuilding Company. Her keel was laid on 18 September 1943. She was launched on 31 October and delivered on 8 December. Built for the WSA, she was operated under the management of Spencer, Kellogg & Sons. Management transferred to American Republics Corp. in 1946. Sold in 1948 to Sabine Transportation Co., Port Arthur, Texas and renamed Walter Du Mont. Sold in 1954 to San Rafael Compania Navigatgion and renamed Panachrandos. Operated under the management of Orion Shipping & Trading Co. Converted to a cargo ship at Schiedam, Netherlands in 1954. Lengthened at Maizuru, Japan in 1955. Now 511 feet 6 inches (155.91 m) long and 8,444 GRT. Re-registered to Liberia. Renamed Andros Pilgrim in 1956. Sold in 1960 to Sutherland Shipping Corp. and renamed Amvrakikos. Re-registered to Greece. Ran aground on the Pancake Shoal, in Lake Superior on 23 November 1961 whilst on a voyage from Toledo, Spain to a Japanese port. She was refloated on 26 November. She was scrapped at Sakai in June 1962.

== Jean Louis ==
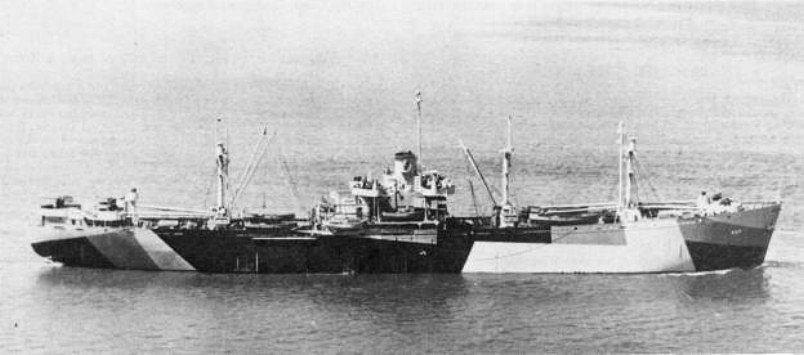
USS Acubens

Jean Louis was built by Delta Shipbuilding Company. Her keel was laid on 25 November 1943. She was launched as Jean Louis on 8 January 1944 and delivered to the United States Navy as Acubens on 9 February. She was converted for naval use by Todd-Johnson Drydocks, New Orleans. Decommissioned at Pearl Harbor in March 1946 and towed to San Francisco. Returned to USMC in June 1947. She was reported to have been scrapped at Portland, Oregon in 1965.

== Jean Nicolet ==
Jean Nicolet was built by Oregon Shipbuilding Corporation. Her keel was laid on 15 September 1943. She was launched on 29 September and delivered on 6 October. Built for the WSA, she was operated under the management of Oliver J. Olson & Co. Torpedoed, shelled, and sunk by I-8 south of the Maldive Islands (3°28′S 74°16′E) on 2 July 1944 whilst on a voyage from Los Angekes to Calcutta, India.

== Jean P. Chouteau ==
Jean P. Chouteau was built by Permanente Metals Corporation. Her keel was laid on 30 November 1943. She was launched on 9 December and delivered on 19 December. Built for the WSA, she was operated under the management of Grace Line Inc. Sold in 1947 to Lloyd Triestino, Trieste, Italy and renamed Duino. Sold in 1964 to Fratelli d'Amico, Rome. She was scrapped at Trieste in December 1971.

== Jean Ribaut ==
Jean Ribaut was built by J. A. Jones Construction Company, Panama City. Her keel was laid on 23 March 1944. She was launched on 5 May and delivered on 29 May. Laid up in the Hudson River post-war, she was scrapped at Kearny or Panama City in June 1970.

== J. E. B. Stuart ==
J. E. B. Stuart was built by Todd Houston Shipbuilding Corporation. Her keel was laid on 22 September 1942. She was launched on 20 November and delivered on 8 December. She was scrapped at Portland, Oregon in July 1969.

== Jedediah S. Smith ==
Jedediah S. Smith was built by California Shipbuilding Corporation. Her keel was laid on 14 April 1943. She was launched on 7 May and delivered on 19 May. She was scrapped at Oakland in October 1964.

== Jefferson Davis ==
Jefferson Davis was built by Alabama Drydock Company. She was delivered on 25 August 1942. She was scrapped at Bellingham in February 1961.

== Jellicoe Seam ==
Jellicoe Seam was a collier built by Delta Shipbuilding Company. Her keel was laid on 13 June 1945. She was launched on 14 August and delivered on 10 October. Built for the WSA, she was operated under the management of Boland & Cornelius, Buffalo, New York. Sold to her managers in 1946. Sold in 1948 to Mystic Steamship Division and renamed Charlestown. Operated under the management of Eastern Gas & Fuel Associates. Sold in 1954 to Atlantic Bulk Trading Corp. and renamed Brant. Re-registered to Liberia and operated under the management of Mystic Steamship Co. Sold in 1961 to Opca Plovidba Brodarsko and renamed Hadjuk. Re-registered to Yugoslavia. Sold in 1962 to Jadranska Slobodna Plovidba, Split. Operated under the management of Adriatic Tramp Shipping. She was scrapped at Hamburg in April 1967.

== Jeremiah L. Chaplin ==
Jeremiah L. Chaplin was built by New England Shipbuilding Corporation. Her keel was laid on 13 September 1943. She was launched as Jeremiah L. Chaplin on 31 October and delivered as Samakron on 9 November. To the MoWT under Lend-Lease. Operated under the management of Royal Mail Lines. Returned to the USMC in 1947 and officially renamed Jeremiah L. Chaplin. Laid up in the James River as Samakron. She was scrapped in Baltimore in 1959.

== Jeremiah M. Daily ==
Jeremiah M. Daily was built by Permanente Metals Corporation. Her keel was laid on 18 July 1943. She was launched on 9 August and delivered on 22 August. Built for the WSA, she was operated under the management of American South African Line. Hit by a Japanese kamikaze attack off Leyte on 12 November 1944 whilst on a voyage from New Guinea to Leyte. She caught fire and was severely damaged. Emergency repairs made enabling her to return to the United States for permanent repairs. Laid up, she was sold in 1947 to Waterman Steamship Corporation and renamed Governor Kilby. Sold in 1948 to Atlantic Cargo Carrier Corp. and renamed Atlanticus. Operated under the management of Orion Shipping & Trading Co. Sold in 1953 to Atlanticus Steamship Inc, Wilmington, Delaware. Sold in 1956 to Terrace Navigation Corp. and renamed Sag Harbor. Operated under the management of James W. Elwell & Co. To the United States Department of Commerce in 1961. She was scrapped at Jersey City in April 1962.

== Jeremiah M. Rusk ==
Jeremiah M. Rusk was built by Permanente Metals Corporation. Her keel was laid on 17 August 1943. She was launched on 8 September and delivered on 15 September. She was scrapped at Gandia in June 1970.

== Jeremiah O'Brien ==
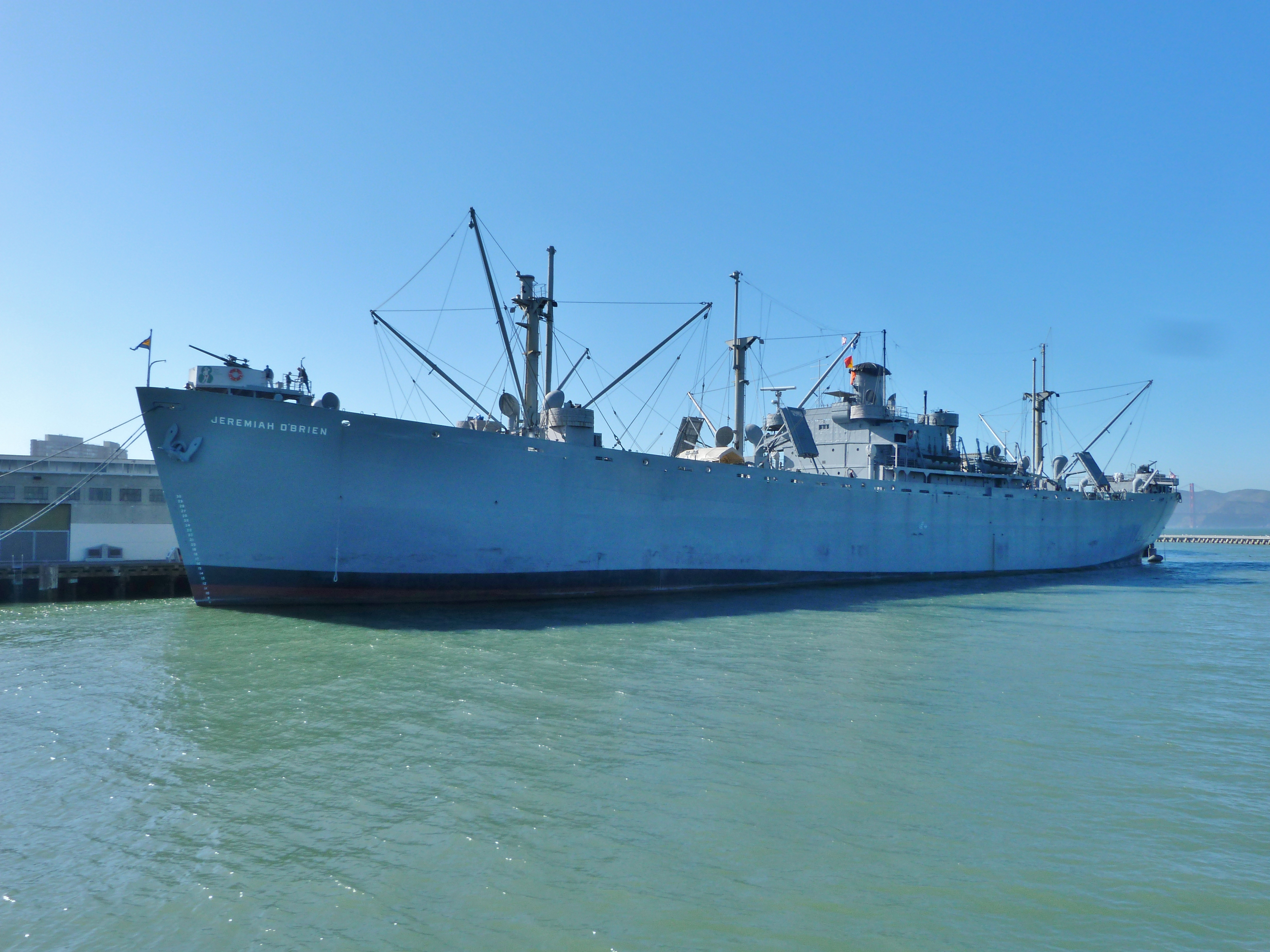
Jeremiah O'Brien

Jeremiah O'Brien was built by New England Shipbuilding Corporation. Her keel was laid on 6 May 1943. She was launched on 19 June and delivered on 30 June. Built for the WSA, she was operated under the management of Grace Line. Withdrawn from service on 7 February 1946 and laid up in Suisun Bay. Scheduled to be transferred to the United States Army for conversion to a hospital ship, but this was not carried out. To National Liberty Ship Memorial Inc. in 1978. Departed Suisun Bay under her own steam on 6 October 1979. Restored by Bethlehem Steel, San Francisco. As of September 2026 she is a seagoing museum ship and war memorial.

== Jeremiah S. Black ==
Jeremiah S. Black was built by California Shipbuilding Corporation. Her keel was laid on 28 November 1942. She was launched on 30 December and delivered on 13 January 1943. She was scrapped at Tacoma in 1963.

== Jeremiah Van Rensselaer ==
Jeremiah Van Rensselaer was built by North Carolina Shipbuilding Company. Her keel was laid on 10 March 1942. She was launched on 7 June and delivered on 24 June. Built for the WSA, she was operated under the management of Agwilines Inc. Torpedoed and set afire by U-456 off Cape Farewell, Greenland (55°13′N 28°52′W) whilst a member of Convoy HX 224. She was sunk by an escorting warship.

== Jeremiah Wadsworth ==
Jeremiah Wadsworth was built by Todd Houston Shipbuilding Corporation. Her keel was laid on 23 June 1942. She was launched on 7 September and delivered on 24 September. Built for the WSA, she was operated under the management of Marine Transport Lines. Torpedoed and sunk off the coast of the Union of South Africa (39°22′S 22°23′E) by U-178 on 27 November 1942 whilst on a voyage from New Orleans to Bombay.

== Jerome K. Jones ==
Jerome K. Jones was built by Southeastern Shipbuilding Corporation. Her keel was laid on 7 July 1943. She was launched on 6 September and delivered on 18 September. Built for the WSA, she was operated under the management of South Atlantic Steamship Line. Sold on 22 May 1947 to Skibs A/S Malmtransport, Oslo and renamed Vindafjord. Operated under the management of Den Norsk Amerikalinje A/S. She ran aground on Svartaskjær in November 1950 whilst on a voyage from Narvik to Antwerp and was severely damaged. Sold on 16 June 1951 to Palmar Compania Naviera S.A. and renamed Gladiator. Re-registered to Liberia and operated under the management of C. D. Peteras. Sold in 1960 to Maritenia Shipping Co. Ltd., Liechtenstein and renamed Solta. Operated under the management of Pomorsko Bagersko Produzece Bager. Sold in 1961 to Maritenia Shipping Co. Ltd. She ran aground off Constanţa, Romania on 31 January 1962. Refloated on 14 March. Sold in 1963 to Jadranska Slobodna Plovidba, Split. Operated under the management of Adriatic Tramp Shipping. Sold to Yugoslavian shipbreakers on 12 June 1968, but resold to Eftorisses Compania Naviera S.A., Panama and renamed Panaghia Kykkou. Operated under the management of Troodos Shipping & Trading Ltd. She arrived at Gadani Beach, Pakistan on 18 February 1972 for scrapping by Yonnus & Hashim, Ganshee.

== Jerry S. Foley ==
Jerry S. Foley was built by St. Johns River Shipbuilding Company. Her keel was laid on 23 August 1944. She was launched on 29 September and delivered on 11 October. Laid up at Beaumont post-war, she was scrapped at Brownsville in June 1971.

== Jesse Applegate ==
Jesse Applegate was built by Oregon Shipbuilding Corporation. Her keel was laid on 22 May 1942. She was launched on 7 July and delivered on 20 July. Laid up in the Hudson River post-war. She was sold to Karachi shipbreakers in December 1970 but was resold. She was scrapped at Bilbao in August 1971.

== Jesse Billingsley ==
Jesse Billingsley was built by Todd Houston Shipbuilding Corporation. Her keel was laid on 1 July 1943. She was launched on 14 August and delivered on 28 August. Built for the WSA, she was operated under the management of W. J. Rountree & Co. She struck a mine in 1946 and was laid up at Trieste in a damaged condition. Sold in 1949 to Società Italiana di Armamente Sidarna, Venice, Italy and renamed Laguna. New FIAT diesel engine fitted at Trieste in 1950. Sold that year to Navigazione Libera Triestina, Trieste. Sold in 1964 to Reefer Navigation Co., Panama and renamed Marilu. Operated under the management of Luigi Monta fu Carlo. Sold in 1965 to Sicula Oceanica, Naples and renamed Orione. She suffered an engine breakdown off the Azores on 3 February 1969 and her holds became flooded in severe weather whilst on a voyage from Bourgas, Bulgaria to Galveston. She was towed to Fayal and then to Vigo, Spain. She was scrapped at Bilbao in 1969.

== Jesse Cottrell ==
Jesse Cottrell was built by Bethlehem Fairfield Shipyard. Her keel was laid on 22 July 1944. She was launched on 26 August and delivered on 11 September. Built for the WSA, she was operated under the management of Pope & Talbot Inc. Sold in 1947 to American Shipping & Trading Co., Panama and renamed Sea Queen. Sold in 1949 to Stockard Steamship Corp., New York and renamed Caribsea. Sold in 1950 to Intercontinental Steamship Corp., New York and renamed Holystar. Sold in 1954 to Margo Shipping Co., Panama and renamed Symphony. Re-registered to Liberia and operated under the management of Triton Shipping Co. Renamed Ektor in 1960 and re-registered to Greece, remaining under the same management. Sold in 1966 to Synthia Shipping Co., Panama. Re-registered to Liberia and operated under the management of Nereus Shipping. She was scrapped at Bilbao in September 1966.

== Jesse De Forest ==
Jesse De Forest was built by Bethlehem Fairfield Shipyard. Her keel was laid on 11 September 1943. She was launched as Jesse De Forest on 3 October and delivered as Samuta on 12 October. To the MoWT under Lend-Lease. Operated under the management of Andrew Weir & Co. Sold in 1947 to Bank Line Ltd. and renamed Kelvinbank, remaining under the same management. She ran aground on a reef off Ocean Island, Gilbert Islands on 6 January 1953 whilst on a voyage from Ocean Island to an Australasian port. She was refloated but was holed by the wreck of Ooma and became a total loss.

== Jesse H. Metcalf ==
Jesse H. Metcalf was built by Walsh-Kaiser Company. Her keel was laid on 13 November 1943. She was launched on 3 March 1944 and delivered on 31 May. Laid up in the Hudson River post-war, she was scrapped at Kearny in November 1968.

== Jewell Seam ==
Jewell Seam was a collier built by Delta Shipbuilding Company. Her keel was laid on 6 February 1945. She was launched on 3 April and delivered on 24 May. Built for the WSA, she was operated under the management of Eastern Gas & Fuel Associates. Sold to her managers in 1947. Sold in 1948 to Mystic Steamship Division and renamed Winchester. Operated under the management of her former owner. Sold in 1961 to Massachusetts Trustees of Eastern Gas & Fuel Association. Sold in 1963 to Mystic Steamship Corporation. To the United States Government in 1967 in exchange for the Type C4 ship Marine Phoenix, then sold later that year to Mohawk Shipping Inc., New York. She was scrapped at Sakaide in December 1967.
