= James Kimball =

James Kimball may refer to:

- James P. Kimball, American metallurgist and geologist
- SS James H. Kimball, a Liberty ship
- Jim Kimball, American punk drummer
