= James Woodrow (professor) =

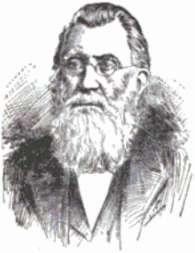
- Born: May 30, 1828; Carlisle, England
- Died: January 17, 1907 (aged 78); Columbia, South Carolina
- Education: Heidelberg University; Harvard University; Jefferson College
- Scientific career
- Workplaces: South Carolina College; Columbia Theological Seminary

James Woodrow (May 30, 1828 – January 17, 1907) was an uncle of United States President Woodrow Wilson, professor at Columbia Theological Seminary, and later president of the College of South Carolina. He was a controversial figure in the Presbyterian Church in the United States in the 1880s.

== Early life ==
James Woodrow was born in Carlisle, England on May 30, 1828, the son of a minister, Thomas Woodrow. At the age of eight, the young James Woodrow moved with his family to Canada, but after finding the climate of Canada disagreeable, the family relocated to Chillicothe, Ohio.

== Education and early career ==
Woodrow attended, and graduated from Jefferson College in 1849. After serving as professor of natural science in Milledgeville at Oglethorpe University from 1850-1853, Woodrow entered the Lawrence School of Science at Harvard University to study under Louis Agassiz. In 1855 and 1856, he studied at Heidelberg University, from where he graduated with an A.M. and Ph.D. summa cum laude.

Along with studying science, Woodrow studied religion and in 1859 was ordained by the Hopewell Presbytery, then part of the Presbyterian Church in the United States of America. He was also appointed as Professor of Chemistry, Geology, and Natural Philosophy at the University of Georgia, but never took the position. Instead, Woodrow took a position at Columbia Theological Seminary in 1861, becoming the first Perkins Professor of Natural Science.

In 1866, with financial aid from his brother, Woodrow also opened a printing business. He restarted the Southern Presbyterian Review, which had been begun in 1846, but had its final publication in 1864, until the circumstances brought about by the Civil War put an end the magazine. Woodrow served as its owner, publisher and chief editor, and, among other things, engaged in a literary debate about geology with fellow PCUS churchman R.L. Dabney, a professor of theology at Union Theological Seminary.

== Controversy ==
In 1859, Charles Darwin's On the Origin of Species was published, causing theological controversy. Woodrow had initially been opposed to evolution, yet eventually became convinced that evolution was true, although, he also believed that there was no contradiction between evolution and the Bible. His silence on the issue throughout the late 1860s and into the 1870s served to provoke rumors that Woodrow had indeed embraced evolution. In 1879, a Columbia Seminary board member named J.B. Mack urged Woodrow to publish his views to quell the rumors, but he replied that his only peculiar teaching on the matter was his rejection that the world was created in 6 literal days. An 1883 statement from the board of Columbia and from Woodrow to the PCUS General Assembly stated that, as the Bible didn't specify God's method of creation, it wasn't contradictory to Scripture to embrace evolution. The statement prompted Mack, who served as the board's financial agent, to have a request approved by the board asking Woodrow to divulge his views as soon as possible. Woodrow, in no position to refuse, revealed his views at a meeting of Columbia Seminary's Alumni Association in the spring in 1884. Woodrow stated that it was possible that Adam's body could have organic continuity with preceding creation, although his soul was uniquely created, as was Eve's body and soul. He also stated that, while he believed the Bible to be true, he had no duty to try and harmonize the probable truths of evolution with Scripture.

The revelation of Woodrow's views created a major firestorm. Within the PCUS, a push to remove him from the Perkins Professorship had begun. Most of the synods and presbyteries in the denomination also had overtures coming in regarding the issue. In September 1884, the Seminary published a statement saying that while they disagreed with Woodrow's theory as to how Adam was created, they found none of his views to be incompatible with Christianity. Nevertheless, owing to the controversy, and a change in leadership in the Seminary, in December 1884, Woodrow's resignation was requested. However, Woodrow refused to resign or appear before the Board to explain why he refused to decline. In the years to come, there would be internal conflict at the seminary over Woodrow's position, and the conflict even forced Columbia to close their doors for the academic year of 1887-1888. Moreover, in 1886, Woodrow was tried for heresy by the Augusta Presbytery, a trial in which he was exonerated, although the presbytery's ruling was overturned by the Synod of Georgia the following year. Woodrow, after years of controversy, was eventually removed from his office at Columbia Theological Seminary. The controversy also prompted the PCUS to take a staunch stance against evolution, a stance which wasn't changed until 1969.

== After the controversy ==
In 1891, Woodrow was elected the president of South Carolina College, a post which he occupied until 1897. Despite the controversy, Woodrow remained a minister in good standing in the PCUS, and after serving as moderator of the Augusta Presbytery in 1888, went on to serve as moderator of the Synod of Georgia in 1901.Woodrow was also named as president of a local bank between 1888 and 1891. Woodrow died in Columbia, South Carolina, on January 17, 1907, aged 78.

== Personal life ==
In 1857, Woodrow married Felie S Baker, the daughter of J.W. Baker, a fellow Presbyterian minister. The couple had four children: a son named James, who died in 1892, who left a widow and three children; and three daughters: Jeanie, Marion and Charlotte.

== Legacy ==
The World War II Liberty Ship SS James Woodrow was named in his honor.
