= USS Pavo =

Cargo ship of the United States Navy

History

United States
- Name: James S. Hogg; Pavo
- Namesake: James S. Hogg; Pavo (constellation)
- Ordered: as a type (EC2-S-C1) hull, MCE hull 846, SS James S. Hogg
- Builder: Todd Houston Shipbuilding Co., Houston, Texas
- Laid down: 8 March 1943
- Launched: 23 April 1943
- Sponsored by: Miss Ima Hogg daughter of James S. Hogg
- Acquired: 29 November 1943
- Commissioned: 14 January 1944
- Decommissioned: 30 November 1945
- Refit: Converted for Naval service at the US Naval Dry Docks, Terminal Island, CA.
- Stricken: 19 December 1945
- Identification: Hull symbol:AK-139
- Fate: Sold for scrapping, 26 October 1971, to Hierros Ardes S.A., Spain

General characteristics
- Class & type: Crater-class cargo ship
- Displacement: 4,023 long tons (4,088 t) (standard); 14,550 long tons (14,780 t) (full load)
- Length: 441 ft 6 in (134.57 m)
- Beam: 56 ft 11 in (17.35 m)
- Draft: 28 ft 4 in (8.64 m)
- Installed power: 2 × Babcock & Wilcox header-type boilers, 220psi 450°; 2,500 shp (1,900 kW)
- Propulsion: 1 × Willamette Shipbuilding vertical triple-expansion reciprocating steam engine; 1 × shaft
- Speed: 12.5 kn (23.2 km/h; 14.4 mph)
- Complement: 366
- Armament: 1 × 5 in (127 mm)/38 caliber dual-purpose (DP) gun; 1 × 3 in (76 mm)/50 caliber DP gun; 2 × 40 mm (1.57 in) Bofors anti-aircraft (AA) gun mounts; 6 × 20 mm (0.79 in) Oerlikon cannon AA gun mounts

USS Pavo (AK-139) was a Crater-class cargo ship commissioned by the U.S. Navy for service in World War II, named after the constellation Pavo. She was responsible for delivering troops, goods and equipment to locations in the war zone.

== Built in Houston, Texas ==
Pavo (AK–139) was laid down as SS James S. Hogg under a Maritime Commission contract by Todd Houston Shipbuilding Corp., Houston, Texas, 8 March 1943, launched 23 April 1943; sponsored by Miss Ima Hogg; acquired by the Navy from the Maritime Commission under bareboat charter 29 November 1943; renamed Pavo 14 December 1943; converted for Navy use at the U.S. Naval Dry Docks, Terminal Island, California, and commissioned at San Pedro, California, 14 January 1944.

== World War II Pacific Theatre operations ==
After shakedown, Pavo loaded cargo at San Diego, California, and sailed for Hawaii. She reached Pearl Harbor 28 February; and, following a month's training, she sailed for the Central Pacific in convoy 21 March. She arrived Majuro, Marshalls, ten days later and began extensive cargo shuttle operations which, for the next nine months, sent her throughout the Central Pacific. After completing runs to Kwajalein and Roi, she transported men and supplies to Tarawa, Gilberts, early in May. She returned damaged material to Pearl Harbor later that month; thence, she resumed supply operations out of the Marshalls.

=== Delivering cargo at Saipan ===
On 23 July Pavo departed Eniwetok in convoy for the Marianas. Arriving Saipan the 28th, she discharged tons of cargo both there and at the recently captured island of Tinian. She returned to Eniwetok in mid-August, but by 1 September she had resumed offloading cargo at Saipan. Less than a fortnight later she transported cargo to Guam before heading back to Eniwetok 13 September. During the next three months she continued her busy schedule with a run to the Gilberts, inter-island shuttles in the Marshalls, and a four-week deployment to American bases in the Marianas.

=== Supporting troops and ship in the Philippines ===
Departing Saipan 12 December, Pavo steamed via Eniwetok to Pearl Harbor where she underwent voyage repairs during much of January 1945. She returned to the U.S. West Coast 10 February, and, after loading supplies at Seattle, Washington, she departed for the Western Pacific 24 February. Her deployment sent her via Pearl, the Marshalls, and the Carolines to Kossol Roads, where she arrived 8 May. Four days later she was ordered to the Philippines and she reached San Pedro Bay, Leyte, 15 May. For more than two months she served as a station cargo ship in Leyte Gulf. She completed discharging cargo 23 July, and on 2 August she sailed for the United States.

=== End-of-war activity ===
Pavo arrived San Pedro, California, 31 August; thence, following repairs at Terminal Island, she departed for the Atlantic Coast 13 October. Her voyage sent her through the Panama Canal 27 October, and on 3 November she entered Hampton Roads, Virginia.

== Post-war decommissioning ==
Pavo began deactivation overhaul at Portsmouth Naval Shipyard 21 November. She decommissioned at Norfolk, Virginia, 30 November 1945 and was returned to WSA at Lee Hall, Virginia, 1 December. Her name was struck from the Naval Vessel Register 19 December 1945. In 1970, she was in the National Defense Reserve Fleet as SS James S. Hogg, based in the James River, Virginia. Final Disposition: fate unknown.
