= SS James W. Denver =

Liberty ship of WWII

History

United States
- Name: James W. Denver
- Namesake: James W. Denver
- Owner: War Shipping Administration (WSA)
- Operator: Calmar Steamship Corp.
- Ordered: as type (EC2-S-C1) hull, MCE hull 949
- Awarded: 30 January 1942
- Builder: Bethlehem-Fairfield Shipyard, Baltimore, Maryland
- Cost: $1,065,166
- Yard number: 2099
- Way number: 15
- Laid down: 20 January 1943
- Launched: 27 February 1943
- Sponsored by: Mrs. A.G. Williams
- Completed: 13 March 1943
- Identification: Call sign: KKNB
- Fate: Torpedoed and sunk in Atlantic Ocean, 11 April 1943

General characteristics
- Class & type: Liberty ship; type EC2-S-C1, standard
- Tonnage: 10,865 LT DWT; 7,176 GRT
- Displacement: 3,380 long tons (3,434 t) (light); 14,245 long tons (14,474 t) (max)
- Length: 441 feet 6 inches (135 m) oa; 416 feet (127 m) pp; 427 feet (130 m) lwl
- Beam: 57 feet (17 m)
- Draft: 27 ft 9.25 in (8.4646 m)
- Installed power: 2 × Oil fired 450 °F (232 °C) boilers, operating at 220 psi (1,500 kPa); 2,500 hp (1,900 kW)
- Propulsion: 1 × triple-expansion steam engine, (manufactured by Worthington Pump & Machinery Corp, Harrison, New Jersey); 1 × screw propeller
- Speed: 11.5 knots (21.3 km/h; 13.2 mph)
- Capacity: 562,608 cubic feet (15,931 m^{3}) (grain); 499,573 cubic feet (14,146 m^{3}) (bale)
- Complement: 38–62 USMM; 21–40 USNAG
- Armament: Varied by ship; Bow-mounted 3-inch (76 mm)/50-caliber gun; Stern-mounted 4-inch (102 mm)/50-caliber gun; 2–8 × single 20-millimeter (0.79 in) Oerlikon anti-aircraft (AA) cannons and/or, 2–8 × 37-millimeter (1.46 in) M1 AA guns

SS James W. Denver was a Liberty ship built in the United States during World War II. She was named after James W. Denver, an American politician, soldier, and lawyer. He served as an officer in the United States Army during the Mexican–American War and the Civil War. He served as the second Secretary of State of California, from 1853 to 1855, before serving in the United States House of Representatives from California, from 1855 to 1857. He served as Secretary of the Kansas Territory, in June 1857, before becoming Territorial Governor of Kansas, in December 1857 – 1858. The city of Denver, Colorado, is named after him.

== Construction ==
James W. Denver was laid down on 20 January 1943, under a Maritime Commission (MARCOM) contract, MCE hull 949, by the Bethlehem-Fairfield Shipyard, Baltimore, Maryland; she was sponsored by Mrs. A.G. Williams, the granddaughter of James Denver, and launched on 27 February 1943.

== History ==
She was allocated to Calmar Steamship Corp., on 13 March 1943.

=== Sinking ===
On 11 April 1943, James W. Denver, on her maiden voyage had fallen behind while traveling in a Convoy UGS 7 to Casablanca, from New York, due to overheated engine bearings. At 15:16, she was struck by a torpedo, fired from U-195, approximately 475 miles (764 km) west of Las Palmas. The torpedo struck between her #2 and #3 holds, on the starboard side. The extensive damage and flooding caused the ship to take on a 40° list to starboard and start settling by the head, this caused the propeller to come up out of the water and loss of control of the ship. At 15:27, the ship was abandoned using five of her six lifeboats, the sixth was fouled when launching because of a davit failure, and two life rafts. At 19:56, another explosion was heard from a torpedo striking James W. Denver's port side, the location was unknown. The ship was assumed to have sunk around 21:12, though it was too dark to see. James W. Denver had been carrying 6,000 t (5,900 long tons; 6,600 short tons) of sugar, acid, flour, aircraft parts, vehicles, and bulldozers, along with 12 P-38s on her deck.

=== Rescue ===
The men from the two life rafts dispersed into the five lifeboats, along with eighteen men that fell out of the lifeboat that fell when the davit failed.

- The first lifeboat, with 11 survivors, were picked up after 7 days at sea, 28°N 23°W, by the Spanish merchant ship SS Cabo Huertas.
- The second lifeboat, with 13 survivors, were pick up after 13 days at sea, 22°42′N 35°05′W, by the Spanish merchant ship SS Campana, at 22:35, they were landed at Aruba, on 3 May 1943.
- The third lifeboat, with 10 survivors, were pick up after 23 days at sea, 21°55′N 17°10′W, by the Portuguese fishing trawler Albufeira, and landed at Lisbon, on 10 May.
- The fourth lifeboat, with 13 survivors, including the master, eight crew members, and four armed guards, were picked up after 25 days at sea, 90 mi (140 km) north of Port Etienne. They had landed on the desert, on 6 May, and spotted by a British patrol aircraft on 9 May, which was able to drop food and medical supplies to them. On 10 May, they were picked up by the submarine chasers PC-2040 and PC-1041, and landed at Port Etienne, on 11 May.
- The fifth lifeboat, with 19 survivors, were picked up after 35 days at sea, by the Spanish sailing vessel Juan, near Belle Nassent, and landed at La Aguerrio, Río de Oro.

The only casualty was the second engineer, who died of exposure and was buried at sea.

Wreck location: 28°46′N 25°40′W

== Bibliography ==
- "Bethlehem-Fairfield, Baltimore MD". www.ShipbuildingHistory.com. 7 August 2021.
- Maritime Administration. "James W. Denver". Ship History Database Vessel Status Card. U.S. Department of Transportation, Maritime Administration.
- Davies, James (May 2004). "Specifications (As-Built)" (PDF). p. 23.
- "SS James W. Denver".
- "James W. Denver".
