= SS James H. Courts =

Liberty ship of WWII

History

United States
- Name: James H. Courts
- Namesake: James H. Courts
- Owner: War Shipping Administration (WSA)
- Ordered: as type (EC2-S-C1) hull, MC hull 2516
- Awarded: 23 April 1943
- Builder: St. Johns River Shipbuilding Company, Jacksonville, Florida
- Cost: $1,002,548
- Yard number: 80
- Way number: 2
- Laid down: 12 December 1944
- Launched: 21 January 1945
- Sponsored by: Mrs. A.H. Laney
- Completed: 31 January 1945
- Fate: Transferred to Greece, 31 January 1945

Greece
- Name: Niki (1945-1949); Hadiotis
- Owner: Kassos Steam Navigation Co., Ltd.
- Operator: Rethymnis & Kulukundis
- Fate: Sold, 1965

Greece
- Name: Achilles
- Owner: Cia. Nav. Tierra del Fuego
- Operator: Counties Shipping, Ltd.
- Fate: Grounded, 21 November 1965; Declared Constructive total loss, scrapped, 1966

General characteristics
- Class & type: Liberty ship; type EC2-S-C1, standard
- Tonnage: 10,865 LT DWT; 7,176 GRT
- Displacement: 3,380 long tons (3,434 t) (light); 14,245 long tons (14,474 t) (max)
- Length: 441 feet 6 inches (135 m) oa; 416 feet (127 m) pp; 427 feet (130 m) lwl
- Beam: 57 feet (17 m)
- Draft: 27 ft 9.25 in (8.4646 m)
- Installed power: 2 × Oil fired 450 °F (232 °C) boilers, operating at 220 psi (1,500 kPa); 2,500 hp (1,900 kW)
- Propulsion: 1 × triple-expansion steam engine, (manufactured by General Machinery Corp., Hamilton, Ohio); 1 × screw propeller
- Speed: 11.5 knots (21.3 km/h; 13.2 mph)
- Capacity: 562,608 cubic feet (15,931 m^{3}) (grain); 499,573 cubic feet (14,146 m^{3}) (bale)
- Complement: 38–62 USMM; 21–40 USNAG
- Armament: Varied by ship; Bow-mounted 3-inch (76 mm)/50-caliber gun; Stern-mounted 4-inch (102 mm)/50-caliber gun; 2–8 × single 20-millimeter (0.79 in) Oerlikon anti-aircraft (AA) cannons and/or, 2–8 × 37-millimeter (1.46 in) M1 AA guns

SS James H. Courts was a Liberty ship built in the United States during World War II. She was named after James H. Courts, a Merchant seaman killed on the cargo ship SS Expositor, 22 February 1943, when she was struck by a torpedo from German submarine U-606.

== Construction ==
James H. Courts was laid down on 12 December 1944, under a Maritime Commission (MARCOM) contract, MC hull 2516, by the St. Johns River Shipbuilding Company, Jacksonville, Florida; she was sponsored by Mrs. A.H. Laney, the wife of the superintendent of the warehouse at St.Johns River SBC, and she was launched on 21 January 1945.

== History ==
She was transferred to Greece, under the Lend-Lease program, on 31 January 1945. She was sold for commercial use, 18 December 1946, to Kassos Steam Navigation Co., Ltd., for $575,339.53.

== Bibliography ==
- "St. John's River Shipbuilding, Jacksonville FL". www.ShipbuildingHistory.com. 16 October 2010.
- Maritime Administration. "James H. Courts". Ship History Database Vessel Status Card. U.S. Department of Transportation, Maritime Administration.
- Davies, James (May 2004). "Specifications (As-Built)" (PDF). p. 23.
- "SS James H. Courts".
- "SS Expositor". www.Uboat.net.
