= SS Jerry S. Foley =

Liberty ship of WWII

History

United States
- Name: Jerry S. Foley
- Namesake: Jerry S. Foley
- Owner: War Shipping Administration (WSA)
- Operator: American South African Lines, Inc.
- Ordered: as type (EC2-S-C1) hull, MC hull 2497
- Awarded: 23 April 1943
- Builder: St. Johns River Shipbuilding Company, Jacksonville, Florida
- Cost: $993,706
- Yard number: 61
- Way number: 1
- Laid down: 23 August 1944
- Launched: 29 September 1944
- Sponsored by: Mrs. Jerry S. Foley
- Completed: 11 October 1944
- Identification: Call sign: KTEW
- Fate: Laid up in the National Defense Reserve Fleet, Beaumont, Texas, 9 October 1948; Sold for scrapping, 5 October 1970, withdrawn from fleet, 12 November 1970

General characteristics
- Class & type: Liberty ship; type EC2-S-C1, standard
- Tonnage: 10,865 LT DWT; 7,176 GRT
- Displacement: 3,380 long tons (3,434 t) (light); 14,245 long tons (14,474 t) (max)
- Length: 441 feet 6 inches (135 m) oa; 416 feet (127 m) pp; 427 feet (130 m) lwl
- Beam: 57 feet (17 m)
- Draft: 27 ft 9.25 in (8.4646 m)
- Installed power: 2 × Oil fired 450 °F (232 °C) boilers, operating at 220 psi (1,500 kPa); 2,500 hp (1,900 kW)
- Propulsion: 1 × triple-expansion steam engine, (manufactured by General Machinery Corp., Hamilton, Ohio); 1 × screw propeller
- Speed: 11.5 knots (21.3 km/h; 13.2 mph)
- Capacity: 562,608 cubic feet (15,931 m^{3}) (grain); 499,573 cubic feet (14,146 m^{3}) (bale)
- Complement: 38–62 USMM; 21–40 USNAG
- Armament: Varied by ship; Bow-mounted 3-inch (76 mm)/50-caliber gun; Stern-mounted 4-inch (102 mm)/50-caliber gun; 2–8 × single 20-millimeter (0.79 in) Oerlikon anti-aircraft (AA) cannons and/or, 2–8 × 37-millimeter (1.46 in) M1 AA guns

SS Jerry S. Foley was a Liberty ship built in the United States during World War II. She was named after Jerry S. Foley a prominent businessman in Jacksonville, Florida. Foley was the president of the Brooks-Scanlon Lumber Company, in Foley, Florida; on the board of directors of the Atlantic National Bank, in Jacksonville; president of the Bahamas-Cuban Co.; and president of the LOP&G Railroad.

== Construction ==
Jerry S. Foley was laid down on 23 August 1944, under a Maritime Commission (MARCOM) contract, MC hull 2497, by the St. Johns River Shipbuilding Company, Jacksonville, Florida; she was sponsored by Mrs. Jerry S. Foley, the wife of the namesake, and was launched on 29 September 1944.

== History ==
She was allocated to the American South African Lines Inc., on 11 October 1944. On 9 October 1948, she was laid up in the National Defense Reserve Fleet, Beaumont, Texas. She was sold for scrapping, 5 October 1970, to Reman Shipping Co., for $42,500. She was removed from the fleet, 12 November 1970.

== Bibliography ==
- "St. John's River Shipbuilding, Jacksonville FL". www.ShipbuildingHistory.com. 16 October 2010.
- Maritime Administration. "Jerry S. Foley". Ship History Database Vessel Status Card. U.S. Department of Transportation, Maritime Administration.
- Davies, James (May 2004). "Specifications (As-Built)" (PDF). p. 23.
- "SS Jerry S. Foley".
