= USS Raccoon (IX-127) =

Armadillo-class tanker

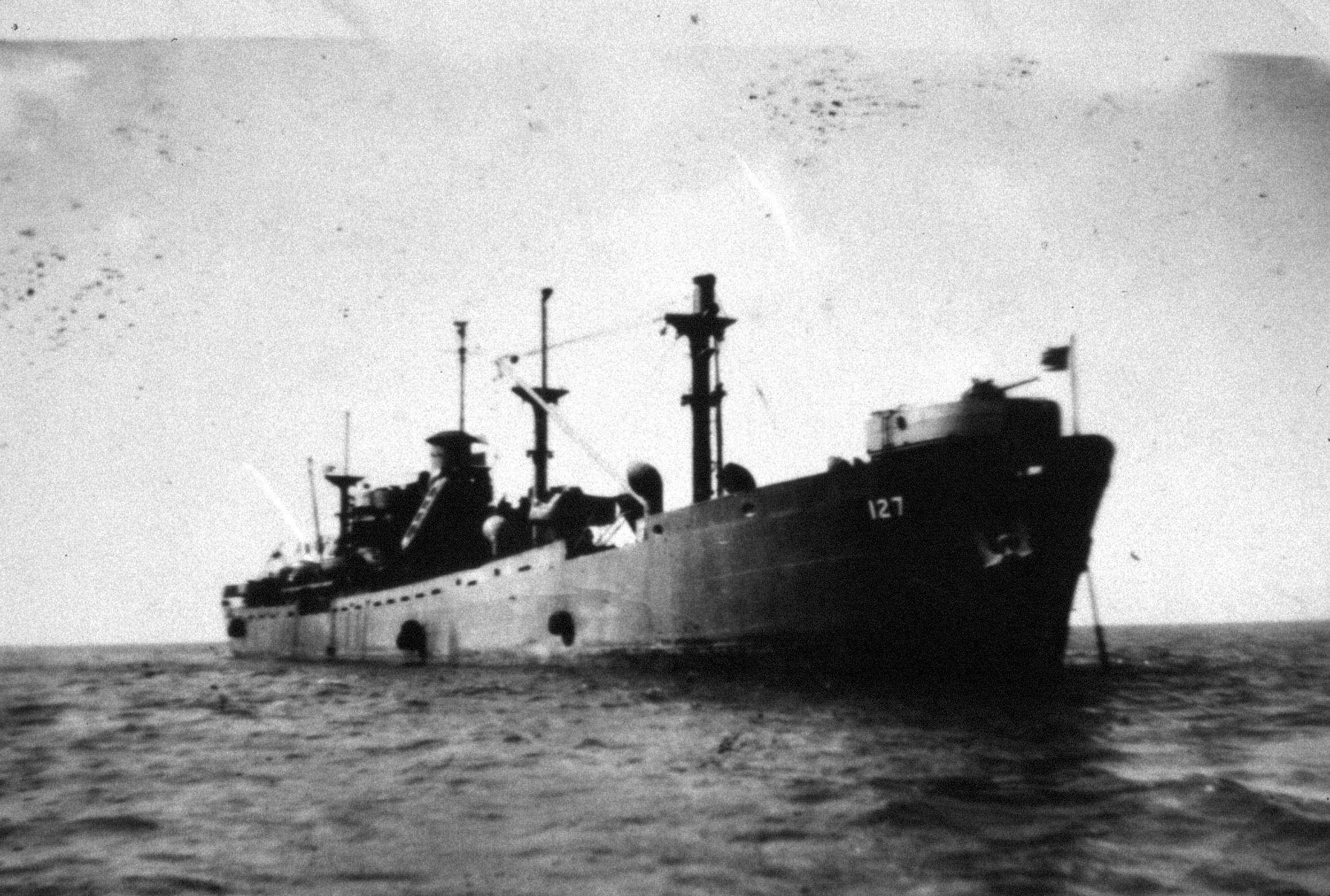

History

United States
- Laid down: 7 November 1943
- Launched: 23 December 1943
- Acquired: 31 January 1944
- Commissioned: 1 February 1944
- Decommissioned: 10 July 1946
- Stricken: 31 July 1946
- Fate: Returned to the WSA

General characteristics
- Type: Armadillo-class tanker
- Displacement: 15,425 tons
- Length: 441 ft 6 in (134.57 m)
- Beam: 56 ft 11 in (17.35 m)
- Draft: 28 ft 4 in (8.64 m)
- Speed: 11 knots (20 km/h; 13 mph)
- Complement: 101 officers and enlisted
- Armament: 1 × 5-inch 38 caliber dual purpose gun; 1 × 3 in (76 mm) gun; 8 × 20 mm cannons

The second USS Raccoon (IX-127), an Armadillo-class tanker designated an unclassified miscellaneous vessel, was the second ship of the United States Navy to be named for the raccoon. She was built as the Liberty ship J. C. W. Becham (MCE Hull No. 1931) by the Maritime Commission and renamed Raccoon by the Navy on 27 October 1943. Her keel was laid down on 7 November 1943 by the Delta Shipbuilding Company, in New Orleans, Louisiana. She was launched on 23 December 1943 sponsored by Mrs. J. C. W. Becham, accepted from the War Shipping Administration (WSA) under bareboat basis on 31 January 1944, and commissioned on 1 February 1944.

After shakedown off the Gulf Coast, this mobile station tanker loaded a cargo of fuel oil at Corpus Christi, Texas; steamed through the Panama Canal; and joined the Third Fleet at Espiritu Santo on 5 April. She took on a deck cargo of lube oil drums which she discharged at Purvis Bay. Returning to Espiritu Santo, she then proceeded to Efate, New Hebrides, fueling Battleship Division 3 and Destroyer Division 90. Arriving at Purvis Bay 20 July, the ship assumed fueling station ship duties and made several side trips to the Russell Islands.

On 14 September, Raccoon proceeded to Samoa to load fuel oil, returning to Espiritu Santo and Purvis Bay for station duty. With the exception of a short trip to Bougainville, she remained at Purvis Bay until 6 February 1945, when she proceeded to the Russell Islands to fuel a task force of attack transports (APAs) and amphibious cargo ships (AKAs). Departing 21 March, Raccoon proceeded to Iwo Jima to fuel destroyers and destroyer escorts on patrol screen. On Easter Sunday, 1 April, she came under fire from kamikaze aircraft. She arrived at Saipan on 14 June for harbor fueling duty which lasted through the end of the war and into April 1946. She then sailed from the Mariana Islands, transited the Panama Canal, and arrived Norfolk, Virginia, on 3 June. Raccoon decommissioned on 10 July, was redelivered to WSA the next day and was stricken from the Naval Vessel Register on 31 July 1946.
