= SS James Woodrow =

Liberty ship of WWII

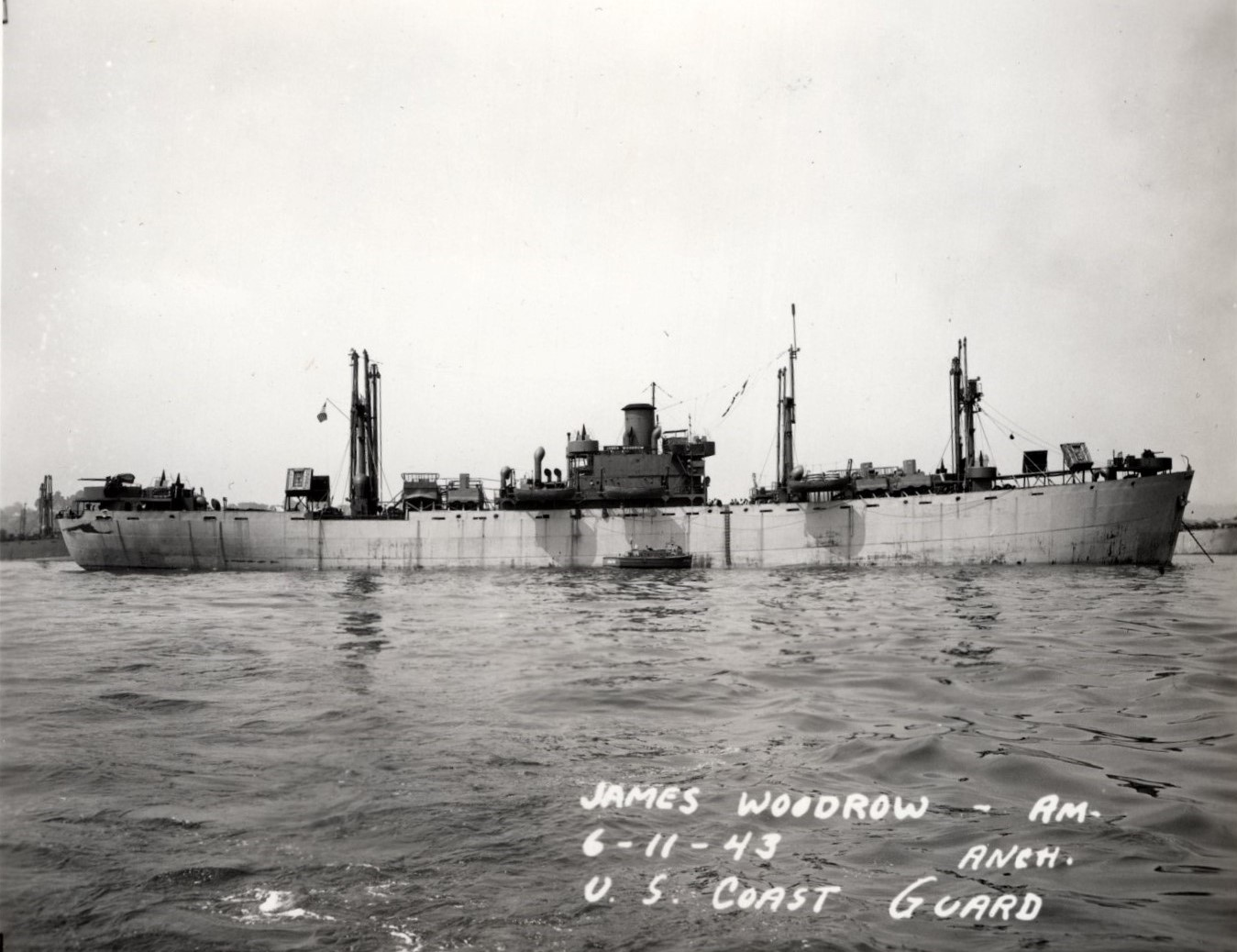
- SS James Woodrow c. 1942

History

United States
- Name: James Woodrow
- Namesake: James Woodrow
- Owner: War Shipping Administration (WSA)
- Operator: American South African Line Inc.
- Ordered: as type (EC2-S-C1) hull, MCE hull 929
- Awarded: 30 January 1942
- Builder: Bethlehem-Fairfield Shipyard, Baltimore, Maryland
- Cost: $1,072,856
- Yard number: 2079
- Way number: 13
- Laid down: 26 November 1942
- Launched: 9 January 1943
- Sponsored by: Mrs. Fitz Williams Woodrow
- Completed: 19 January 1943
- Identification: Call sign: KJLT
- Fate: Laid up in Reserve Fleet, 12 January 1946, sold for scrap 15 May 1954

General characteristics
- Class & type: Liberty ship; type EC2-S-C1, standard
- Tonnage: 10,865 LT DWT; 7,176 GRT
- Displacement: 3,380 long tons (3,434 t) (light); 14,245 long tons (14,474 t) (max)
- Length: 441 feet 6 inches (135 m) oa; 416 feet (127 m) pp; 427 feet (130 m) lwl
- Beam: 57 feet (17 m)
- Draft: 27 ft 9.25 in (8.4646 m)
- Installed power: 2 × Oil fired 450 °F (232 °C) boilers, operating at 220 psi (1,500 kPa); 2,500 hp (1,900 kW)
- Propulsion: 1 × triple-expansion steam engine, (manufactured by General Machinery Corp., Hamilton, Ohio); 1 × screw propeller
- Speed: 11.5 knots (21.3 km/h; 13.2 mph)
- Capacity: 562,608 cubic feet (15,931 m^{3}) (grain); 499,573 cubic feet (14,146 m^{3}) (bale)
- Complement: 38–62 USMM; 21–40 USNAG
- Armament: Varied by ship; Bow-mounted 3-inch (76 mm)/50-caliber gun; Stern-mounted 4-inch (102 mm)/50-caliber gun; 2–8 × single 20-millimeter (0.79 in) Oerlikon anti-aircraft (AA) cannons and/or, 2–8 × 37-millimeter (1.46 in) M1 AA guns

SS James Woodrow was a Liberty ship built in the United States during World War II. She was named after James Woodrow. He was an uncle of United States President Woodrow Wilson, professor at Columbia Theological Seminary, and later president of the College of South Carolina.

== Construction ==
James Woodrow was laid down on 26 November 1942, under a Maritime Commission (MARCOM) contract, MCE hull 929, by the Bethlehem-Fairfield Shipyard, Baltimore, Maryland; she was sponsored by Cicely deGraffenreid Woodrow, wife of James grandson Colonel Fitz William McMaster Woodrow I, and was launched on 9 January 1943.

== History ==
She was allocated to American South African Line Inc., on 19 January 1943.

On 12 January 1946, she was laid up in the Suisun Bay Reserve Fleet, in Benicia, California. Sometime before 21 December 1951, she had sustained damage to her hull and propulsion system from grounding, with a $240,000 estimate to repair. On 25 February 1954, it was recommended that she be sold for scrap. On 15 May 1954, she was sold to the Boston Metals Company, for $222,222, to be scrapped.

== Bibliography ==
- "Bethlehem-Fairfield, Baltimore MD". www.ShipbuildingHistory.com. 7 August 2021.
- Maritime Administration. "James Woodrow". Ship History Database Vessel Status Card. U.S. Department of Transportation, Maritime Administration.
- Davies, James (May 2004). "Specifications (As-Built)" (PDF). p. 23.
- "SS James Woodrow".
