= SS James H. Kimball =

World War II Liberty ship of the United States

History

United States
- Name: James H. Kimball
- Namesake: James H. Kimball
- Owner: War Shipping Administration (WSA)
- Operator: American Export Lines, Inc.
- Ordered: as type (EC2-S-C1) hull, MC hull 2298
- Builder: J.A. Jones Construction, Panama City, Florida
- Cost: $998,294
- Yard number: 39
- Way number: 6
- Laid down: 7 March 1944
- Launched: 22 April 1944
- Completed: 16 May 1944
- Identification: call sign KWAY
- Fate: Laid up in National Defense Reserve Fleet, Astoria, Oregon, 26 November 1946; Sold for commercial use, 11 April 1947

Panama
- Name: Azuero
- Namesake: Azuero
- Owner: Azuero Cia. Nav., Panama
- Operator: Embiricos Ltd., London
- Acquired: 11 April 1947
- Fate: Ran aground and broke in two, 24 December 1968

General characteristics
- Class & type: Liberty ship; type EC2-S-C1, standard
- Tonnage: 10,865 LT DWT; 7,176 GRT
- Displacement: 3,380 long tons (3,434 t) (light); 14,245 long tons (14,474 t) (max)
- Length: 441 feet 6 inches (135 m) oa; 416 feet (127 m) pp; 427 feet (130 m) lwl
- Beam: 57 feet (17 m)
- Draft: 27 ft 9.25 in (8.4646 m)
- Installed power: 2 × Oil fired 450 °F (232 °C) boilers, operating at 220 psi (1,500 kPa); 2,500 hp (1,900 kW)
- Propulsion: 1 × triple-expansion steam engine, (manufactured by Iron Fireman Manufacturing Co., Portland, Oregon); 1 × screw propeller
- Speed: 11.5 knots (21.3 km/h; 13.2 mph)
- Capacity: 562,608 cubic feet (15,931 m^{3}) (grain); 499,573 cubic feet (14,146 m^{3}) (bale)
- Complement: 38–62 USMM; 21–40 USNAG
- Armament: Varied by ship; Bow-mounted 3-inch (76 mm)/50-caliber gun; Stern-mounted 4-inch (102 mm)/50-caliber gun; 2–8 × single 20-millimeter (0.79 in) Oerlikon anti-aircraft (AA) cannons and/or, 2–8 × 37-millimeter (1.46 in) M1 AA guns

SS James H. Kimball was a Liberty ship built in the United States during World War II. She was named after James H. Kimball, the chief meteorologist in the New York Weather Bureau.

== Construction ==
James H. Kimball was laid down on 7 March 1944, under a United States Maritime Commission (MARCOM) contract, MC hull 2298, by J.A. Jones Construction, Panama City, Florida; she was launched on 22 April 1944.

== History ==
She was allocated to American Export Lines, Inc., on 16 May 1944. On 26 November 1946, she was laid up in the National Defense Reserve Fleet, in Astoria, Oregon. On 11 April 1947, she was sold to Azuero Cia. Nav., for commercial service. On 24 December 1968, she ran aground in River Gironde, after she had engine trouble. She later broke in two and was declared a total loss.

== Bibliography ==
- "Jones Construction, Panama City FL". ShipbuildingHistory.com. 13 October 2010.
- "Liberty Ships – World War II".
- Maritime Administration. "James H. Kimball". Ship History Database Vessel Status Card. U.S. Department of Transportation, Maritime Administration. Archived from the original on 12 December 2019.
- Davies, James (May 2004). "Specifications (As-Built)" (PDF). p. 23.
- "SS James H. Kimball".
