= USS Elkhorn =

Patapsco-class gasoline tanker

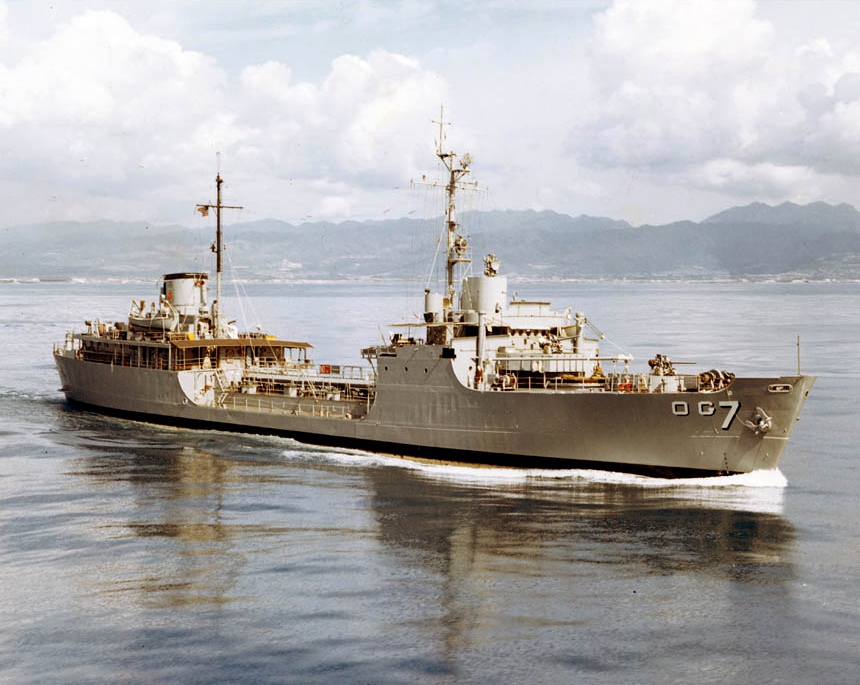

History

United States
- Name: USS Elkhorn
- Namesake: Elkhorn River in Nebraska
- Ordered: as T1-MT-M1 tanker hull
- Launched: 15 May 1943
- Commissioned: 12 February 1944
- Decommissioned: 1 July 1972
- Stricken: 15 April 1976
- Fate: Sold to Taiwan

History

Taiwan
- Name: ROCS Hsing Lung (AOG-517)
- Acquired: 1972
- Decommissioned: April 1, 2005
- Reclassified: AOG-515

General characteristics
- Class & type: Patapsco-class gasoline tanker
- Tonnage: 2,210 long tons deadweight (DWT)
- Displacement: 1,850 long tons (1,880 t) light; 4,130 long tons (4,196 t) full load
- Length: 310 ft 9 in (94.72 m)
- Beam: 48 ft 6 in (14.78 m)
- Draft: 15 ft 8 in (4.78 m)
- Propulsion: 4 × General Electric diesel-electric engines, twin shafts, 3,300 hp (2,461 kW)
- Speed: 15 knots (17 mph; 28 km/h)
- Complement: 131
- Armament: 4 × 3"/50 caliber guns; 12 × 20 mm AA

Service record
- Part of: US Pacific Fleet
- Operations: World War II, Korean War, Vietnam War
- Awards: 1 battle stars (Korea); 8 battle stars (Vietnam)

USS Elkhorn (AOG-7) was a Patapsco-class gasoline tanker in service with the U.S. Navy from 1944 to 1972. She was then sold to Taiwan, where she served as ROCS Hsing Lung (AOG-515/AOG-517). Her final fate is unknown.

== History ==
=== United States Navy (1944-1972) ===
Elkhorn was launched 15 May 1943 by Cargill Inc., Savage, Minnesota; sponsored by Mrs. J. A. Flynn; and commissioned 12 February 1944.

==== World War II ====
Elkhorn sailed from New Orleans, Louisiana, 25 February 1944 for the South Pacific Ocean, and arrived at Milne Bay, New Guinea, 29 May for duty as station tanker. She made several voyages to Manus to reload and fueled ships in the invasion of Morotai in September 1944, otherwise serving at Milne Bay until March 1945 when she arrived at Leyte. Elkhorn served throughout the Philippines until 1 December, then returned to the U.S.West Coast for overhaul.

==== Korean War ====
Elkhorn remained on active service with the US Pacific Fleet through 1962. From her base at Pearl Harbor she alternated tours of duty in the Far East with cruises among the islands of the South and central Pacific. During the Korean War she operated in Japanese waters and off the Korean coast twice, in 1951 and 1953, and in 1956 and 1957 she sailed from the west coast to Icy Cape and Point Barrow as a part of the Arctic resupply missions.

==== Vietnam War ====
Delivered fuel up and down the coast and in the inland water ways from Da Nang south and to the north. In 1969 relieved USS Genesis also an AOG in Da Nang delivering fuel up and down the coast north to Cửa Việt Base and areas south of Da Nang. Returned to Pearl Harbor, Hawaii around November 1969. Returned to Vietnam for the winter and spring offensive in 1970.

=== Republic of China Navy (1972-2005) ===
Elkhorn was sold to the Republic of China on 1 May 1972 under the Security Assistance Program. Prior to her transfer to the Republic of China, she was decommissioned from the U.S. Navy on 1 July 1972 and stricken from the American Naval Vessel Register on 15 April 1976. In Republic of China Navy service, she was renamed ROCS Hsing Lung with the pennant number AOG-517, later changed to AOG-515. Her decommission date is April 1, 2005.

== Military awards and honors ==
Elkhorn earned one battle star for Korean War service:

- Korean Summer-Fall 1953

She received eight campaign stars for Vietnam War service:

- Vietnam Defense
- Vietnam Counteroffensive
- Vietnam Counteroffensive - Phase II
- Vietnam Counteroffensive - Phase III
- Vietnam Counteroffensive - Phase V
- Vietnam Counteroffensive - Phase VI
- Vietnam Summer-Fall 1969
- Vietnam Winter-Spring 1970

Elkhorn’s crew was eligible for the following medals and commendations:

- China Service Medal (extended)
- American Campaign Medal
- Asiatic-Pacific Campaign Medal
- World War II Victory Medal
- Navy Occupation Service Medal (with Asia clasp)
- National Defense Service Medal (2)
- Korean Service Medal (1)
- Antarctica Service Medal (2)
- Armed Forces Expeditionary Medal (2-Vietnam)
- Vietnam Service Medal (8)
- Republic of Vietnam Gallantry Cross Unit Citation (6)
- Philippine Liberation Medal
- United Nations Service Medal
- Republic of Vietnam Campaign Medal
- Republic of Korea War Service Medal (retroactive)
