= USS Pinnebog =

United States Navy Patapsco-class gasoline tanker

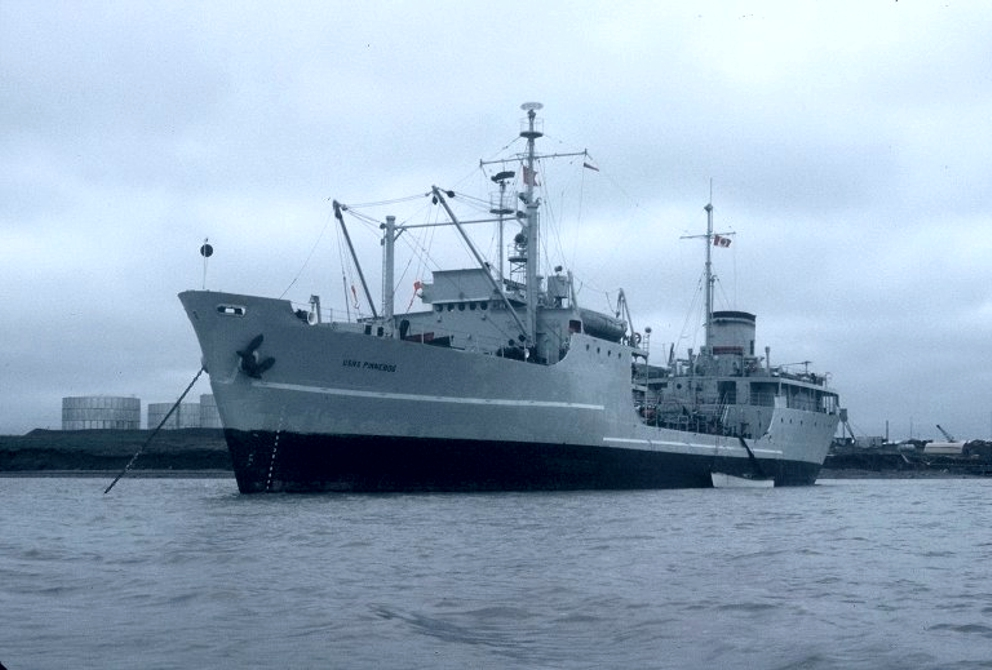
- Pinnebog at anchor off Tuktoyaktuk, Canada, circa 1973

History

United States
- Name: USS Pinnebog
- Namesake: Pinnebog River in Michigan
- Ordered: As a type T1-MT-M1 tanker hull
- Builder: Cargill, Inc., Savage, Minnesota
- Laid down: 9 December 1944
- Launched: 12 May 1945
- Commissioned: 20 October 1945
- Decommissioned: 2 May 1949
- Name: USNS Pinnebog (T-AOG-58)
- Recommissioned: March 1952
- Decommissioned: July 1954
- Recommissioned: 23 April 1956
- Decommissioned: September 1957
- Identification: IMO number: 8332887
- Fate: Scrapped 18 April 1988

General characteristics
- Class & type: Patapsco-class gasoline tanker
- Tonnage: 2,120 long tons deadweight (DWT)
- Displacement: 1,846 long tons (1,876 t) light; 4,130 long tons (4,196 t) full load
- Length: 310 ft 9 in (94.72 m)
- Beam: 48 ft 6 in (14.78 m)
- Draft: 15 ft 8 in (4.78 m)
- Propulsion: 4 × General Electric diesel engines, electric drive, twin shafts, 3,300 hp (2,461 kW)
- Speed: 14 knots (16 mph; 26 km/h)
- Complement: 131
- Armament: 4 × 3"/50 caliber guns; 12 × 20 mm AA guns

USS Pinnebog (AOG–58) was a Patapsco-class gasoline tanker acquired by the U.S. Navy for the dangerous task of transporting gasoline to warships in the fleet, and to remote Navy stations.

Pinnebog was laid down, 29 December 1944, as a Maritime Commission type (T1-MT-M1) tanker hull, under a Maritime Commission contract, at Cargill, Inc., Savage, Minnesota. She was launched on 12 May 1945 and commissioned Pinnebog (AOG-58), 20 October 1945.

== Service as a U.S. Navy gasoline tanker ==
After serving with the U.S. Navy for 3½ years as a gasoline tanker, Pinnebog was placed out of commission in reserve 2 May 1949 in the Texas Group, Atlantic Reserve Fleet.

Reactivated, she was assigned to MSTS in March 1952 and operated under contract with a civilian crew until July 1954, when she was again placed in reserve, berthed in Florida. She was transferred to the Maritime Administration 20 April 1956 and to MSTS 23 April 1956.

== Loaned to the U.S. Air Force ==
She was then operated by an MSTS civil service crew until September 1957, when she was loaned to the U.S. Air Force.

== Deactivation ==
Pinnebog was struck from the Naval Register (date unknown) and custody was transferred to the Maritime Commission, 15 December 1987. She was scrapped on 18 April 1988.
