= USS Agawam (AOG-6) =

Patapsco-class gasoline tanker

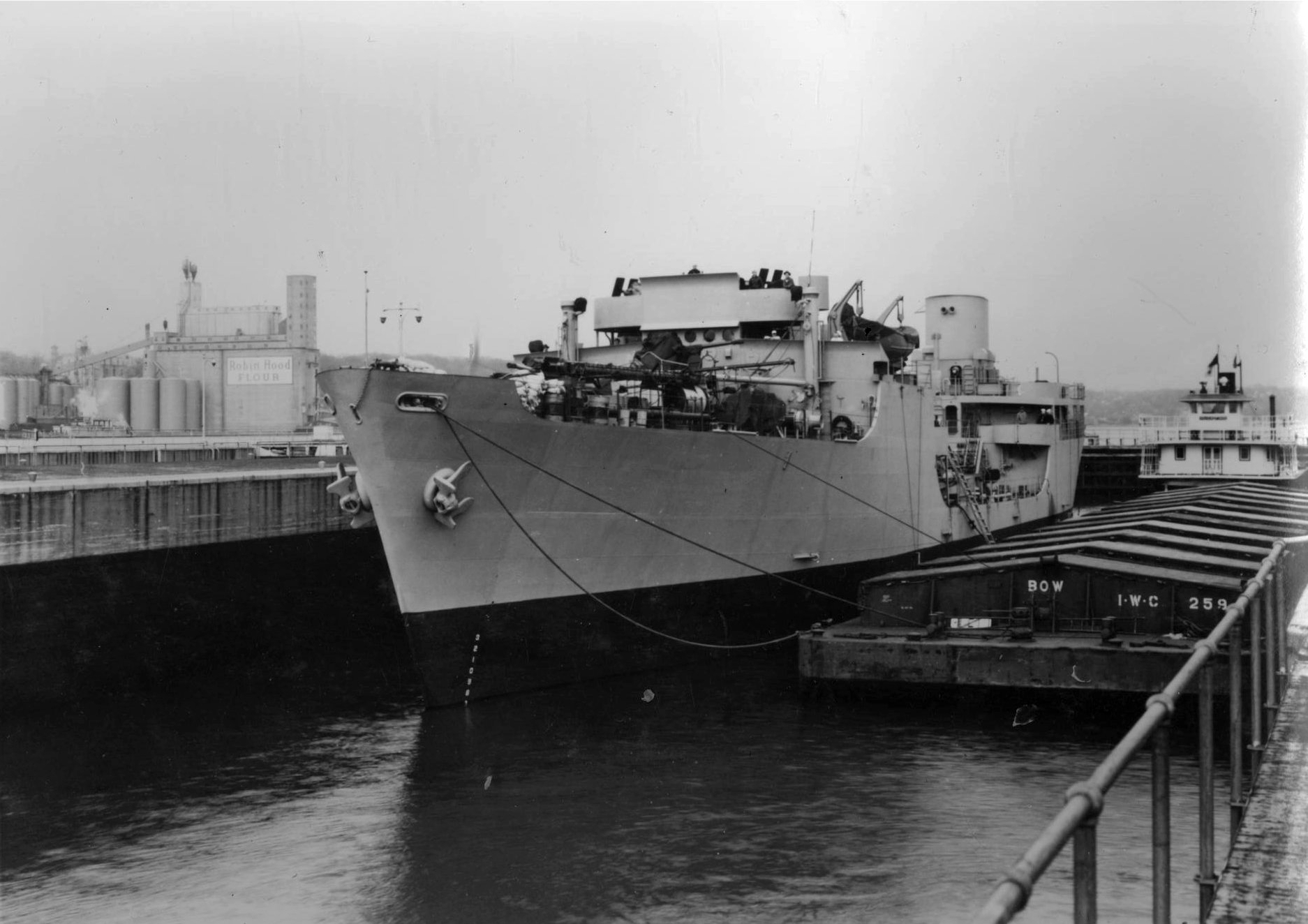
- USS Agawam (AOG-6) at Mississippi i River Lock No. 15, in tow of the Federal Barge Line's Towboat Huck Finn, 12 November 1943. while en route from her builder's yard at Savage, MN. to New Orleans, LA.

History

United States
- Name: USS Agawam
- Namesake: Agawam River
- Ordered: as T1-MT-M1 tanker hull
- Laid down: 7 September 1942
- Launched: 6 May 1943
- Commissioned: 18 December 1943
- Decommissioned: 31 January 1957
- Stricken: 1 July 1960
- Fate: Scrapped, October 1975

General characteristics
- Class & type: Patapsco-class gasoline tanker
- Tonnage: 2,210 long tons deadweight (DWT)
- Displacement: 1,850 long tons (1,880 t) light; 4,130 long tons (4,196 t) full load
- Length: 310 ft 9 in (94.72 m)
- Beam: 48 ft 6 in (14.78 m)
- Draft: 15 ft 8 in (4.78 m)
- Propulsion: 4 × General Electric diesel-electric engines, twin shafts, 3,300 hp (2,461 kW)
- Speed: 15.5 knots (17.8 mph; 28.7 km/h)
- Complement: 131
- Armament: 4 × 3"/50 caliber guns; 12 × 20 mm AA

Service record
- Operations: World War II

USS Agawam (AOG-6) was a Patapsco-class gasoline tanker acquired by the U.S. Navy for the dangerous task of transporting gasoline to warships in the fleet, and to remote Navy stations.

The second warship to be named Agawam by the Navy, AOG-6 was laid down on 7 September 1942 at Savage, Minnesota, by Cargill, Inc.; launched on 6 May 1943; sponsored by Mrs. George F. Jacobs; and commissioned at New Orleans, Louisiana, on 18 December 1943.

== World War II service ==
After a period of alterations and fitting out, the gasoline tanker left Galveston, Texas, on 24 January 1944, bound for the Pacific Ocean. She arrived at Espiritu Santo on 1 March and continued on to Tulagi. As a member of Service Squadron (ServRon) 8, Agawam was based at that island in the Solomons for the next 10 months servicing Allied facilities located throughout the island group.

=== Supporting the Philippine invasion ===
In September, Agawam began a 27-day availability at Espiritu Santo and resumed her operations at Tulagi on 25 October. The gasoline tanker was detached from ServRon 8 on 28 January 1945 and got underway for Lingayen Gulf, Philippines. Upon her arrival there on 1 March, she was assigned to Service Force, U.S. 7th Fleet, and for the next month engaged in routine operations between Manila, Subic Bay, and Lingayen Gulf.

=== On loan to the U.S. Army ===
On 1 April, Agawam was transferred, on loan, to the U.S. Army for the support of its land-based forces. She delivered aviation and motor gasoline to Army forces for two months in lower Lingayen Gulf and subsequently performed the same services at Manila for three months.

== Post-war activity ==
A fortnight after Japan capitulated, the tanker was ordered to Tokyo. Routed via Okinawa, she reached Yokohama on 18 September and spent the next month there fueling Army installations ashore. On 25 October, the ship reported to Shanghai, China, for fueling operations at bases located along the Huangpu River. She got underway to return to Japan on 26 November and moored at Nagasaki on the 28th.

The gasoline tanker remained actively engaged in logistic support of the occupation forces in Japan through January 1946. The ship was then returned to Navy custody and got underway on the 28th for the voyage back to the United States.

== Stateside overhaul ==
Upon her arrival at San Pedro, California, Agawam entered a shipyard for overhaul. Back in top shape, she sailed for Guam on 1 July and served as a station ship at that island until June 1949. During this period she made voyages to various ports in Japan; to Saipan; to Iwo Jima; to Shanghai, China; and to Truk.

== Based out of Pearl Harbor ==
In June 1949, Agawam switched her base of operations to Pearl Harbor. She carried gasoline to Alaska and various islands in the Central Pacific. On 13 November 1953, the tanker sailed for the Philippine Islands and served in that archipelago through April 1954.

Agawam then returned to Pearl Harbor and continued operating from that base supporting American installations throughout the Central Pacific. On 22 November 1956, Agawam left Hawaii, bound for San Diego.

== Inactivation and decommissioning ==
Upon her arrival, she began a pre-inactivation overhaul. Agawam was placed out of commission, in reserve, at San Diego, on 31 January 1957. Her name was struck from the Navy list on 1 July 1960, and the ship was transferred to the Maritime Administration, and she was placed in the National Defense Reserve Fleet and laid up at Olympia, Washington. She was sold to Levin Metals in October 1975, presumably for scrapping.

== Military awards and honors ==
Agawam's crew was eligible for the following medals:

- American Campaign Medal
- Asiatic-Pacific Campaign Medal
- World War II Victory Medal
- Navy Occupation Service Medal (with Asia Clasp)
- National Defense Service Medal
- Philippine Liberation Medal
