= USS Susquehanna =

Four ships of the United States Navy have been named USS or USNS Susquehanna, for the Susquehanna River which rises in Lake Otsego in central New York and flows across Pennsylvania and the northeastern corner of Maryland into the Chesapeake Bay, which is the flooded estuary of that river.

- USS Susquehanna (1850) was a sidewheel steamer that was launched in 1850. She served as the flagship of Commodore Matthew Perry's Black Fleet that opened up Japan to foreign commerce and diplomatic exchanges, and during the American Civil War. She was decommissioned in 1868, and sold for scrap in 1883.
- USS Susquehanna (ID-3016) was a German ocean liner named SS Rhein at the outbreak of World War I when she was interned in the port of Baltimore in 1914, since the United States was a neutral country. She became American property when the United States entered the war in 1917. She was taken out of commission in 1919 and was disposed of by scrapping in Japan.
- USS Susquehanna (AOG-5) was a Patapsco-class gasoline tanker, that was launched in 1942, and that served in the U.S. Navy during World War II. She was transferred to the U.S. Army in 1946, and she was struck from the Navy list in 1947. The tanker was reacquired by the Navy in 1950 and reinstated as USNS Susquehanna T-AOG-5. She was taken out of service and struck from the Navy list again in 1959, and eventually scrapped.
- USNS Susquehanna (T-AO-185) was a Falcon-class transport tanker. She was launched in 1972 as the civilian ship Falcon Princess, and later leased by the US Navy and renamed. She was taken out of service in 1983, and was scrapped in 2001.
