= USS Wacissa (AOG-59) =

Patapsco-class gasoline tanker

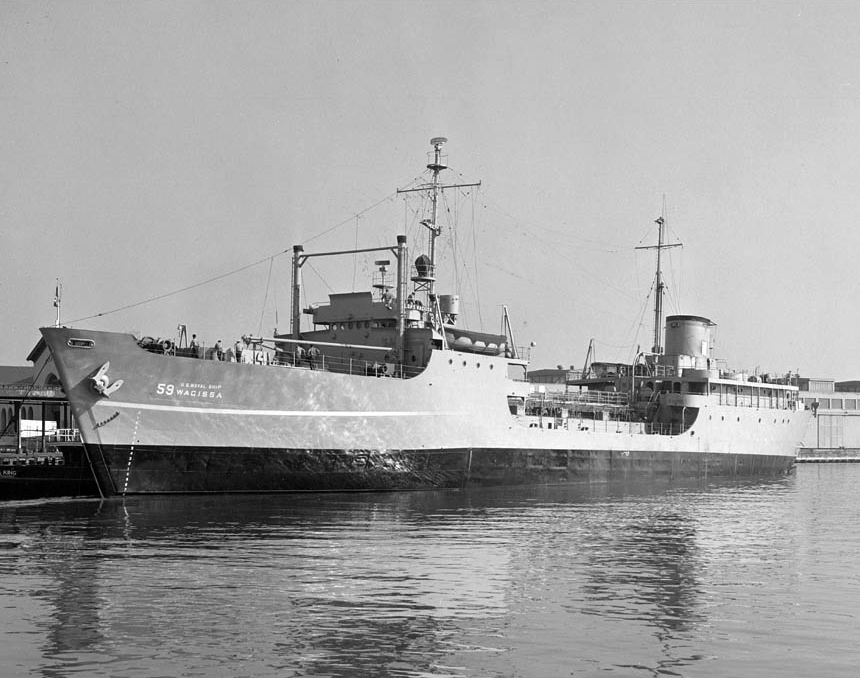

History

United States
- Name: USS Wacissa
- Namesake: Wacissa River in Florida
- Ordered: As type T1-MT-M1 tanker hull
- Builder: Cargill, Inc., Savage, Minnesota
- Laid down: 11 November 1944
- Launched: 15 June 1945
- Completed: 20 May 1946
- Stricken: 23 April 1947
- Reinstated: 30 April 1948
- Fate: Placed in reserve
- Name: USNS Wacissa (T-AOG-59)
- Recommissioned: 18 February 1952
- Decommissioned: 25 May 1954
- Fate: Placed in reserve
- Name: USNS Wacissa (T-AOG-58)
- Recommissioned: 24 May 1956
- Decommissioned: 16 October 1956
- In service: Loaned to the US Air Force, 16 September 1957; Loaned to Canada, 1958-1963
- Stricken: 1 December 1963
- Fate: Sold for scrapping May 1964

General characteristics
- Class & type: Patapsco-class gasoline tanker
- Tonnage: 2,120 long tons deadweight (DWT)
- Displacement: 1,846 long tons (1,876 t) light; 4,130 long tons (4,196 t) full load
- Length: 310 ft 9 in (94.72 m)
- Beam: 48 ft 6 in (14.78 m)
- Draft: 15 ft 8 in (4.78 m)
- Propulsion: 4 × General Electric diesel engines, electric drive, twin shafts, 3,300 hp (2,461 kW)
- Speed: 14 knots (16 mph; 26 km/h)
- Complement: 131
- Armament: 4 × 3"/50 caliber guns; 12 × 20 mm AA guns

USS Wacissa (AOG-59) was a Patapsco-class gasoline tanker delivered to the United States Navy in 1946. She was directly put in reserve and reactivated for service with the Military Sea Transportation Service between 1952 and 1956. In 1957, she was transferred to the United States Air Force. Shortly thereafter she was transferred to Canada again. She was finally scrapped in 1964.

== History ==
Wacissa was laid down on 11 November 1944 at Savage, Minnesota, by Cargill, Inc.; launched on 15 June 1945; sponsored by Mrs. Albert Ford; and completed on 20 May 1946. Declared surplus to U.S. Navy needs on 1 June 1946, the ship was authorized for disposal on the 5th. Struck from the Navy list on 23 April 1947, Wacissa was delivered to the Maritime Commission during the following summer and berthed with the Maritime Commission Reserve Fleet at Lake Charles, Louisiana. She was then placed on a list of ships slated for disposal via sale.

The U.S. Navy, however, requested that the gasoline tanker be taken off the sale list. She was accordingly transferred to the Naval Reserve Fleet berthing area at Orange, Texas, on 3 April 1948. However, as facilities for upkeep and preservation were minimal at Orange, Wacissa was towed to New Orleans, Louisiana, for a preservation process which would prepare the ship for retention in the Navy's inactive fleet. Towed back to Orange, Texas, the ship was reinstated on the U.S. Navy list on 30 April, inactivated on 2 May, and placed in reserve on the 3rd.

=== Military Sea Transportation Service ===
The onset of the Korean War caused an expansion of the United States Navy. On 18 February 1952, Wacissa was transferred to the Military Sea Transportation Service (MSTS) and received the designation T-AOG-59. She took part in Operation Sumac, exercises conducted in the North Atlantic from May through July 1952. Subsequently, she carried cargoes of high test aviation gasoline and lubricating oils to Goose Bay, Labrador, and Argentia, Newfoundland. She ran aground at Polaris Reef, Baffin Bay, on 9 October. Floated free on the 16th, the tanker was then put into Halifax, Nova Scotia, for repairs which lasted from 25 October to 19 December. She then resumed her operations along the east coast and continued them into the spring of 1954.

On 25 May 1954, USNS Wacissa was placed out of service, in reserve, and was assigned to the Florida Group, Atlantic Reserve Fleet. Berthed at the Mayport Basin of the Green Cove Springs facility, the gasoline tanker remained in reserve until returned to MSTS on 24 May 1956. She carried a cargo of gasoline and oils from Aruba, Netherlands West Indies, to San Pedro and Long Beach, California, via the Panama Canal, and operated for a time off the west coast, stopping at Seattle, Washington, and San Francisco, California. She was then inactivated at the latter port and delivered to the Maritime Administration - the renamed Maritime Commission - and, on 16 October 1956, was delivered to the National Defense Reserve Fleet at Suisun Bay, California.

=== U.S. Air Force ===
Remaining in custodial status from that date, she lay there inactive until 8 April 1957, when she was transferred back to MSTS to resume her lubricant and fuel carrying duties off the west coast. USNS Wacissa was transferred to the Department of the Air Force on 16 September 1957.

=== Canada ===
Soon after that, she was turned over to the Canadian government to operate with the Northern Transportation Co., Ltd. — the firm which had assumed responsibility for the annual resupplying of Distant Early Warning (DEW) line radar stations in the central Arctic.

The Canadian government operated the tanker in these northern climes until 1963.

=== Decommissioning and fate ===
Wacissa was returned to the United States Navy in 1963. Struck from the Navy list on 1 December 1963, she was transferred to the Maritime Administration in May 1964 and was then sold in the same month to the Nicolai Joffre Corp., of Beverly Hills, California, for scrapping.
