= USS Chehalis (AOG-48) =

Patapsco-class gasoline tanker

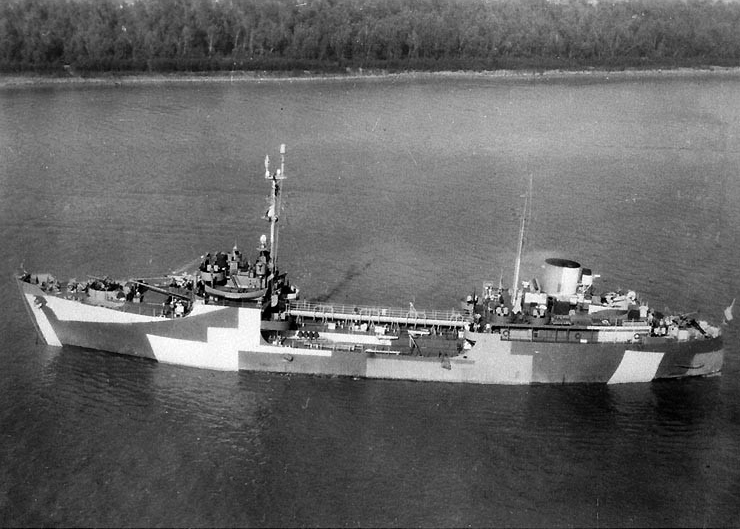
- USS Chehalis (AOG-48) Photographed c. 1944, while wearing Camouflage Measure 32, Design 3D

History

United States
- Name: USS Chehalis
- Namesake: Chehalis River in Washington
- Ordered: as T1-MT-M1 tanker hull
- Builder: Cargill, Inc., Savage, Minnesota
- Laid down: 23 November 1943
- Launched: 15 April 1944
- Commissioned: 5 December 1944
- Stricken: 27 October 1949
- Fate: Sunk by explosion, with the loss of 6 lives, 7 October 1949

General characteristics
- Class & type: Patapsco-class gasoline tanker
- Tonnage: 2,120 long tons deadweight (DWT)
- Displacement: 1,846 long tons (1,876 t) light; 4,130 long tons (4,196 t) full load
- Length: 310 ft 9 in (94.72 m)
- Beam: 48 ft 6 in (14.78 m)
- Draft: 15 ft 8 in (4.78 m)
- Propulsion: 4 × General Electric diesel engines, electric drive, twin shafts, 3,300 hp (2,461 kW)
- Speed: 14 knots (16 mph; 26 km/h)
- Complement: 131
- Armament: 4 × 3"/50 caliber guns; 12 × 20 mm AA guns

USS Chehalis (AOG-48) was a Patapsco-class gasoline tanker acquired by the United States Navy for the dangerous task of transporting gasoline to warships in the fleet, and to remote Navy stations. The vessel was named after the Chehalis River located in Washington state.

Chehalis was laid down on 6 November 1943 at Savage, Minnesota, by Cargill, Inc.; launched on 15 April 1944; sponsored by Mrs. John H. MacMillan Sr.; and commissioned on 5 December 1944.

== World War II service ==
Following her shakedown, Chehalis cleared Galveston, Texas, on 5 January 1945 to call at San Diego, California, en route to Pearl Harbor, which she reached on 6 February. Until 14 April, she carried out fueling operations in the Hawaiian Islands and at Canton in the Phoenix group, aiding the many ships conducting their training in these areas. Sailing west, she put into Kossol Roads, Palaus, before arriving in San Pedro Bay, Philippine Islands, on 5 May with a cargo of aviation gasoline and lubricants for forces in the Philippines. For the next three months, she fueled motor torpedo boats and U.S. Army crash boats operating along the Leyte coast, and from 6 August to 23 November provided similar service to motor torpedo boats at Okinawa, her crew developing "a fine sense of familiarity with their battle stations" despite never being a direct target of Japanese aircraft during the course of hostilities.

=== Surviving typhoons ===
Thrice during Chehalis's time at Okinawa, twice in September and once in October, typhoons forced a suspension of normal operations and compelled the ship to get underway to ride out the storms. Having finished her task in the western Pacific Ocean, the ship departed Buckner Bay on 26 November for Olympia, Washington, reaching her destination on 19 December to receive the "warm welcome of the people of the city of Chehalis...who had paid for the ship with their war bonds [and who] expressed their thanks to the Navy in the hospitality shown her crew."

== Post-war activity ==
After overhaul at Puget Sound, Chehalis returned to the Hawaiian Islands on 23 March 1946, and for the next three and a half years carried aviation gasoline, airplane lubricating oil, and diesel oil among the Hawaiian group and to the Pacific islands to the westward, calling at Johnston Island, Palmyra Island, Samoa, Canton Island, Kwajalein, Midway Island, Saipan, Truk, Manus, Iwo Jima, and Eniwetok.

== Disaster in Samoa ==
At 01:23 (Samoan time) on 7 October 1949, as Chehalis lay alongside the navy dock at Tutuila, American Samoa, one of her gasoline tanks exploded, killing six of her 75-man crew.

The ship burst into flames, capsized, and sank in 45 feet of water. She later slid off the ledge, atop of which she had originally sunk, into 150 feet of water. She was stricken from the Naval Register on 27 October 1949. Her salvaged hulk was later sold to the government of American Samoa in a contract entered into on 21 October 1955.

Chehalis was carrying a cargo of ammunition and petroleum when it sank. After evidence of significant leakage of fuel from the wrecked ship, environmental risk assessments indicated that the remaining fuel aboard needed to be removed. The fuel was removed by April 2010, but no steps were taken to remove the ammunition aboard the wreck as it was not considered to be necessary.

== Military awards and honors ==
Chehalis’ crew was eligible for the following medals:

- American Campaign Medal
- Asiatic-Pacific Campaign Medal
- World War II Victory Medal
- Philippine Liberation Medal
