= USS Chestatee =

Patapsco-class gasoline tanker

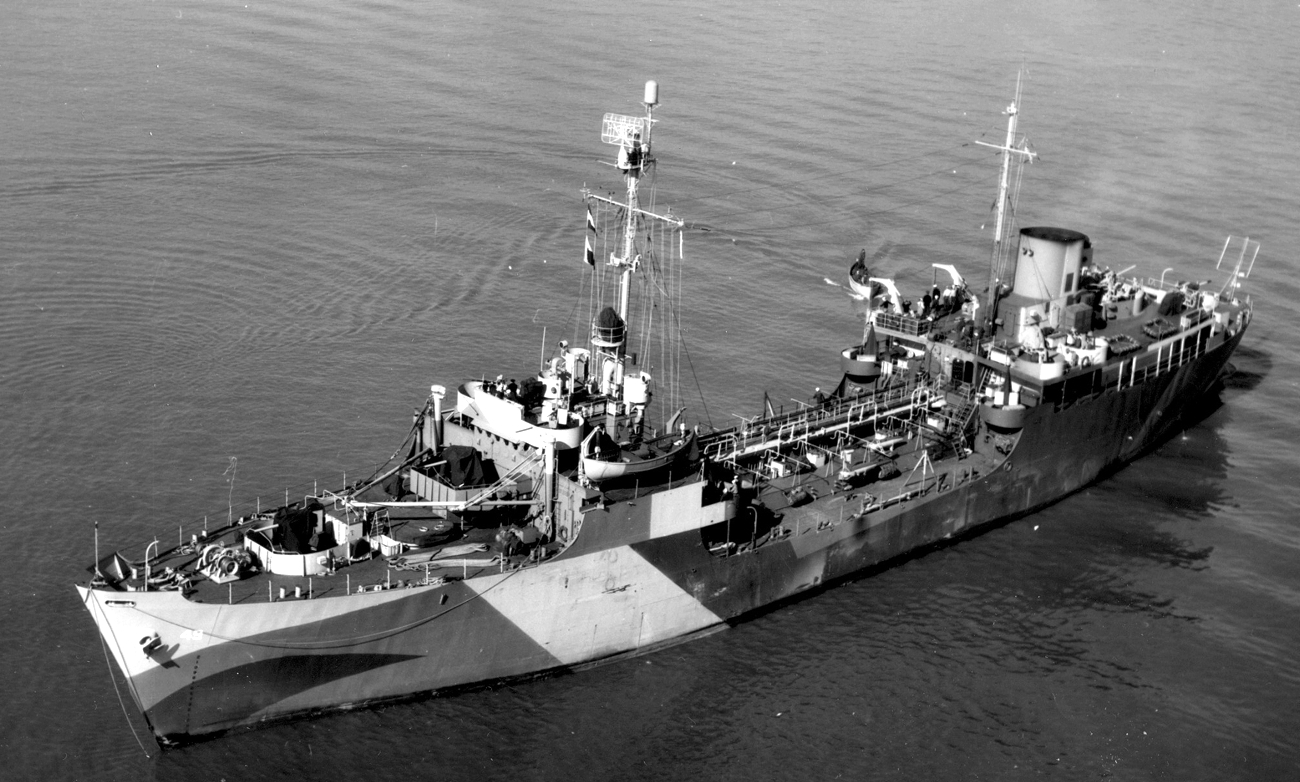

History

United States
- Name: USS Chestatee
- Ordered: as T1-MT-M1 tanker hull
- Builder: Cargill Inc., Savage, Minnesota
- Laid down: date unknown
- Launched: 29 April 1944
- Commissioned: 14 December 1944
- Decommissioned: 8 April 1946
- In service: as USNS Chestatee (T-AOG-49); in March 1952
- Out of service: 8 November 1956
- Stricken: 1 June 1963
- Fate: Disposed of by scrapping 16 October 1975

General characteristics
- Class & type: Patapsco-class gasoline tanker
- Tonnage: 2,120 long tons deadweight (DWT)
- Displacement: 1,846 long tons (1,876 t) light; 4,130 long tons (4,196 t) full load
- Length: 310 ft 9 in (94.72 m)
- Beam: 48 ft 6 in (14.78 m)
- Draft: 15 ft 8 in (4.78 m)
- Propulsion: 4 × General Electric diesel engines, electric drive, twin shafts, 3,300 hp (2,461 kW)
- Speed: 14 knots (16 mph; 26 km/h)
- Complement: 131
- Armament: 4 × 3"/50 caliber guns; 12 × 20 mm AA guns

USS Chestatee (AOG-49) was a Patapsco-class gasoline tanker in service with the United States Navy from 1944 to 1946 and with the Military Sea Transportation Service from 1952 and 1956. From 1957 to 1962, she was lent to the United States Air Force. She was sold for scrap in 1975.

== History ==
Chestatee was launched 29 April 1944 by Cargill Inc., Savage, Minnesota; sponsored by Mrs. J. D. Boren; and commissioned 14 December 1944.

=== World War II ===
Laden with oil products, Chestatee cleared Baytown, Texas, 14 January 1945 for San Pedro Bay, Leyte, where she arrived 1 March for duty transporting high-octane gasoline among the Philippine Islands.

On 27 July, while underway for Brunei Bay, Borneo, Chestatee struck a mine in the straits south of Balabac Island; five of her men were killed, eight injured, including the commanding officer LT. William N. Ohly, and the ship was damaged by the explosion and resulting fire. Among those killed was 30 year old Henry Bowden West of Greenville, NC. Carpenter First Class West left his wife, Lyda Catherine Craig West of Pickens County, SC, and their eleven month old son, Charles Henry West, in Charleston, SC.

Repaired at Puerto Princesa, Palawan, and Samar, Chestatee returned to her Philippine operations until 20 November 1945, when she sailed from Leyte for San Francisco, California, which she reached 13 January. There she was decommissioned 8 April 1946, and, on 30 June 1946, transferred to the Maritime Commission.

=== Military Sea Transportation Service (1952-1956) ===
Chestatee was returned to the Navy and placed in reserve, out of commission, in August 1948. Reactivated, she was assigned to Military Sea Transportation Service (MSTS) in March 1952 as USS Chestatee (T-AOG-49) and operated by a civilian crew until May 1954 when she was again placed in reserve. A second tour of service with MSTS began in April 1956 and continued until 8 November 1956 when Chestatee transferred to the Suisun Bay branch of the National Defense Reserve Fleet.

=== United States Air Force (1957-1962) ===
Withdrawn from the Suisun Bay Reserve Fleet on 2 April 1957, she was lent to the United States Air Force, in September 1957. Chestatee was transferred by the Air Force to the Olympia, Washington (USA), branch of the National Defense Reserve Fleet on 14 September 1962 and was stricken from the Naval Vessel Register on 1 June 1963. On 2 June 1971, Chestatee was transferred to the Suisun Bay branch of the National Defense Reserve Fleet due to the closure of the Olympia fleet site.

Chestatee was sold on 16 October 1975 as part of a lot of 7 vessels to the Levin Metals Corporation of San Jose, Ca. She was removed from the Suisun Bay fleet on 16 February 1977 and was scrapped shortly afterwards.

== Military awards and honors ==
Her crew was eligible for the following medals:

- American Campaign Medal
- Asiatic-Pacific Campaign Medal
- World War II Victory Medal
- Philippine Liberation Medal

Individual Awards:

- Purple Heart (27 July 1945 - 5 KIA, 8 WIA)
