= USS Tombigbee =

Gasoline tanker in the United States Navy

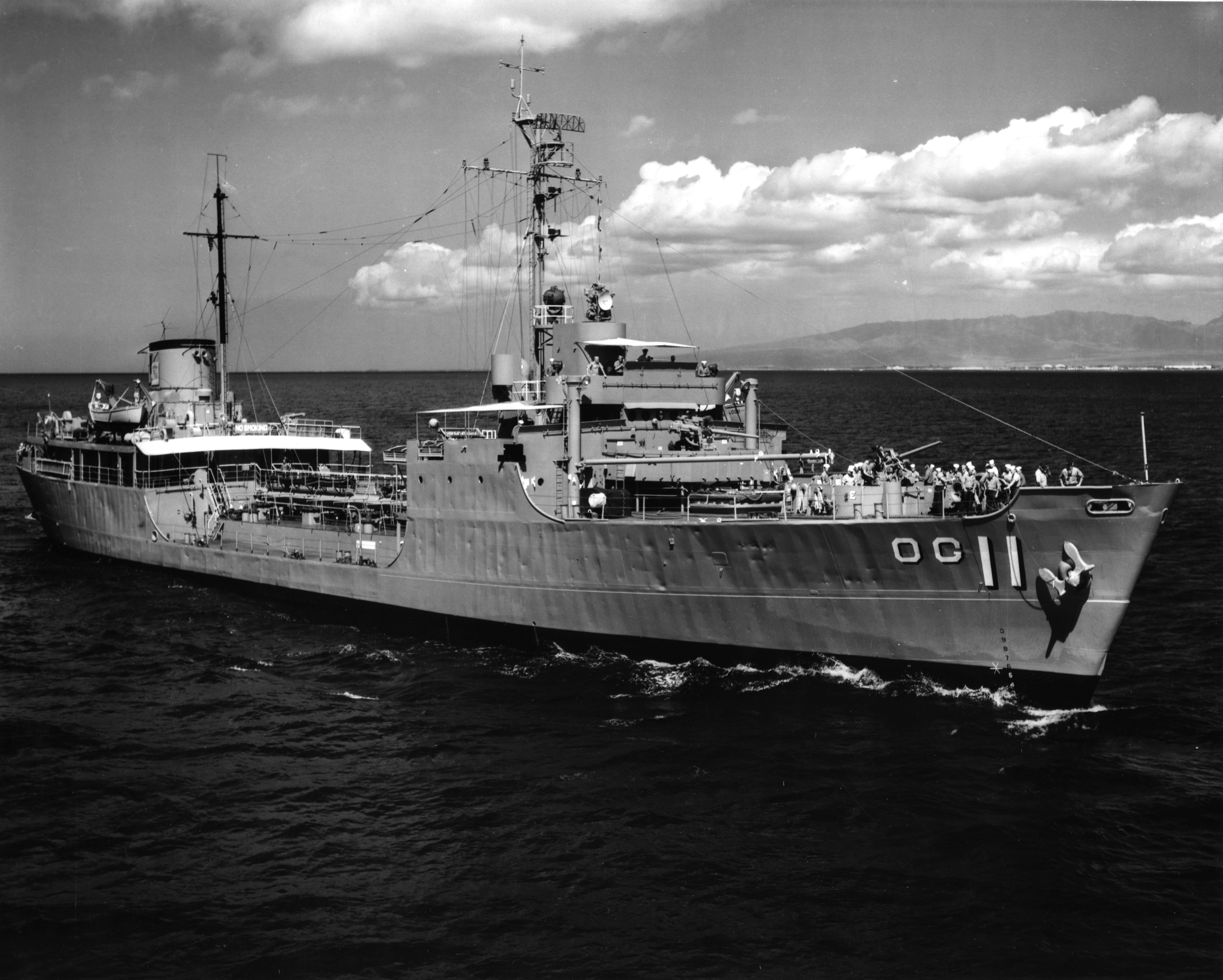

History

United States
- Name: USS Tombigbee
- Namesake: Tombigbee River in Alabama
- Builder: Cargill, Inc. Savage, Minnesota
- Laid down: 23 October 1942
- Launched: 18 November 1943
- Commissioned: 13 July 1944
- Decommissioned: 12 December 1949
- Recommissioned: 28 July 1950
- Decommissioned: 7 July 1972
- Identification: AOG-11
- Fate: Sold to Greece, 7 July 1972

Greece
- Name: Ariadni
- Namesake: Ariadne
- Acquired: 7 July 1972
- Commissioned: 1972
- Decommissioned: 2003
- Identification: A414

General characteristics
- Class & type: Patapsco-class gasoline tanker
- Tonnage: 2,210 long tons deadweight (DWT)
- Displacement: 1,850 long tons (1,880 t) light; 4,130 long tons (4,196 t) full load
- Length: 310 ft 9 in (94.72 m)
- Beam: 48 ft 6 in (14.78 m)
- Draft: 15 ft 8 in (4.78 m)
- Propulsion: 4 × General Electric diesel-electric engines, twin shafts, 3,300 hp (2,461 kW)
- Speed: 15.5 knots (17.8 mph; 28.7 km/h)
- Complement: 131
- Armament: 4 × 3"/50 caliber guns; 12 × 20 mm AA

Service record
- Operations: World War II; Korean War; Vietnam War
- Awards: 2 battle stars (World War II); Navy Occupation Service Medal; 11 campaign stars (Vietnam)

USS Tombigbee (AOG-11) was a Patapsco-class gasoline tanker in service with the United States Navy from 1943 to 1972. She was then sold to Greece, where she served as Ariadni (A414) until 2003.

== United States Navy (1943–1972) ==
=== World War II ===
Tombigbee, named after the Tombigbee River, was laid down on 23 October 1942 at Savage, Minnesota, by Cargill, Inc., launched on 18 November 1943, sponsored by Mrs. F. R. Stoltz, and commissioned on 13 July 1944 at New Orleans, Louisiana.

Following shakedown, Tombigbee departed Galveston, Texas, on 13 August, bound for the West Coast of the United States. She transited the Panama Canal en route, reached San Diego, California on the 28th, pushed on for the western Pacific, and arrived at Pearl Harbor on 4 September, where she paused briefly before proceeding on to Eniwetok, in the Marshalls, joining Service Squadron 10.

Her tanks filled with fresh water instead of the oil for which she was designed, Tombigbee began replenishing the tanks of the ships of the fleet and worked out of Guam and Ulithi, continuing this duty for the remainder of the year. The ship's first exposure to combat came while she lay anchored at Ulithi on 20 November 1944. A Japanese midget submarine slipped into the anchorage area and torpedoed the oiler Mississinewa, anchored less than 1,500 yards (1,400 m) from Tombigbee.

The tanker remained on the Guam-Ulithi "express" water supply run through January 1945. On 7 February, while she was steaming toward Guam, orders rerouted Tombigbee to Saipan. Subsequently removed to Tinian with a full load of water, she supplied water until 19 February, when she joined Task Group (TG) 50.9 and got underway for the Volcano Islands. At 09:24 six days later, Tombigbee was detached from the task group and entered the harbor at Iwo Jima. There, the water carrier lay-to and kept out of the line of fire of the supporting warships. Rough seas hampered her water-discharging operations, but the need for fresh water overrode the need to protect the ship from rough-sea damage.

After remaining in the Iwo Jima area until 9 March, the ship proceeded to Guam, where she reloaded her holds with water. Later in the month, Tombigbee joined the invasion force heading for the Ryūkyūs.

Easter Sunday, April 1, was cool and slightly overcast, with a calm sea; a perfect day for an amphibious operation. Tombigbee arrived off the beaches of Okinawa at 05:45 and steamed to a position on the eastern side of the island, close to the transport group. As she neared the anchorage, a Japanese kamikaze, its pilot intent on bigger game than the water carrier, flew past the tanker's starboard side and crashed into the attack transport ship Hinsdale before she could unload her troops.

The next day, Tombigbee shifted her anchorage to Hagushi on the western side of the island. During succeeding weeks, Tombigbee's men saw numerous kamikazes crash into combat ships and auxiliaries. Meanwhile, they often remained at general quarters up to 20 hours a day while supplying water to landing craft and amphibious warfare ships. The ship made trips to Kerama Retto carrying water from fleet tankers coming from the Philippines. Tombigbee remained off Okinawa through the end of the war, and her historian noted that "the entire harbor went wild" when news arrived that Japan had accepted unconditional surrender terms.

The tanker departed the Ryūkyūs on 21 September, bound for Japanese waters, and, two days later, arrived at Sasebo to participate in occupation operations. She twice returned to Okinawa for reloading. By November, Army and Navy doctors judged the water supply around Nagasaki as drinkable, and the tanker began replenishing her depleted tanks with local water to supply the ships still on duty in Japanese ports.

=== Operation Crossroads ===
Following this tour of duty, for which she received the Navy Occupation Service Medal, Tombigbee supported the ships participating in the atomic bomb testing (Operation Crossroads) in the Marshalls at Bikini Atoll, from 1 April to 5 September 1946. During the assignment, she made periodic trips to Eniwetok for replenishment of water. Four days after her arrival at Pearl Harbor on 14 September, the ship headed for the west coast for an overhaul which lasted into 1947. Upon her return to the western Pacific, she began conducting local operations in the Marshalls; at Eniwetok and Kwajalein, which continued from 13 January to 14 March. Then, following brief repairs at Pearl Harbor, Tombigbee was again deployed to the Far East. She operated out of Guam; Yokosuka, Japan; Pusan and Jinsen (Inchon), Korea; Qingdao, China; Buckner Bay and Naha, Okinawa; as well as at Manila in the Philippine Islands. The tanker remained in the Far East until 1 August, when she departed Qingdao, bound for Long Beach, California. After overhaul, the ship returned to the Orient and touched at familiar ports before heading for the west coast late in the summer of 1949 for inactivation. On 12 December 1949, Tombigbee was placed out of commission, in reserve, at the Mare Island Naval Shipyard, Vallejo, California.

=== Korean War ===
The North Korean invasion of South Korea, commencing on 25 June 1950, triggered the reactivation of many Navy ships, including Tombigbee. The gasoline tanker was recommissioned at Mare Island, California, on 28 July 1950 and was deployed to the Middle Pacific (MidPac) operating area where she served until near the end of hostilities in Korea. On 13 May 1953, she sailed for the northern Pacific and operated in that area until 22 December when she was transferred back to MidPac. On 27 March 1954 Tombigbee was part of the fuel supply network for aircraft and other support vehicles on Bikini, Eniwetok, & Kwajalein atoll during the AEC Nuclear weapons tests.

=== Cold War ===
The tanker conducted logistic support operations in the Pacific through 1964, taking part in various fleet operations. During the period from 1953 to 1964, the ship participated in Operation Rocky Shoals (22 October to 22 December 1958), Operation Twin Peaks (13–31 May 1959), Operation Blue Star (26 February to 6 April 1960), Operation Long Haul and Operation Pack Mule (8 September to 20 October 1960), Operation Green Light (10 May to 28 June 1961), and Operation Silver Sword (27 October to 6 November 1961), and her areas of operation ranged from Maui, Hawaii, to Yokosuka, Japan.

She deployed to the Far East in the spring of 1962, conducting logistic support operations out of Subic Bay, Philippines, from 16 May to 8 June before proceeding to Yokosuka and technical availability. For the remainder of the year, the ship conducted local operations out of Pearl Harbor before departing the Hawaiian area on 18 December for Port Lyttelton, New Zealand, and participation in Operation Deep Freeze 1963. Following a port visit to Lyttelton from 5–9 January 1963, Tombigbee pressed on for the colder climes of McMurdo Sound and conducted operations in support of "Deep Freeze" from 18–22 January before returning – via Nelson, New Zealand and Sydney, Australia – to Pearl Harbor. After local operations out of Pearl, the tanker was deployed to the Marshalls for local petroleum-carrying operations through the late summer before returning once again to the Hawaiian Islands for local operations and technical availability at Pearl Harbor.

Tombigbee continued her unglamorous but vital support duties in the Pacific. She was again deployed to the Marshalls – Kwajalein and Eniwetok – and also conducted local operations out of Pearl. Returning to the west coast in the spring, the tanker participated in Exercise "Pinetree" from 21–28 May 1964 before returning to Pearl Harbor. Two shuttle runs between Pearl Harbor and Kaneohe Bay, Hawaii; classified operations, and technical and restricted availability at Naval Station Pearl Harbor, occupied the ship through late October, before she was again deployed to the Philippines. While in the Far East, Tombigbee operated out of Subic Bay; Kaohsiung, Taiwan; Hong Kong; and Yokosuka before departing Japan on 7 June and arriving at Pearl Harbor on the 18th. She remained in Hawaiian waters for the rest of 1965.

=== Vietnam War ===
Upon completion of her regular overhaul at Pearl Harbor, Tombigbee conducted regular refresher training before departing Pearl on 21 February 1966 for passage to Subic Bay, where she made port on 12 March. Deploying to coastal waters off Vietnam, the tanker conducted two logistic support deployments, from 18 March to 6 June, and from 11 July to 28 August, before returning to Pearl Harbor for restricted availability, independent ship exercises, and operations as a submarine target reference vessel.

Homeported at Pearl Harbor in 1967, Tombigbee began the new year with operations with Submarine Flotilla 5 and Destroyer Flotilla 5 on antisubmarine warfare exercises off Maui before she conducted exercises in anticipation of her second WestPac deployment. On 6 September, she departed Pearl Harbor, bound, via Guam and Subic Bay, for South Vietnam and arrived at Da Nang on 4 October. She conducted logistics support operations in the I Corps tactical zone from 4 October to 2 December, from 29 December 1967 to 26 January 1968, and from 25 February to 19 March. Availability at Subic Bay punctuated her tours in the combat zone.

Following a return to Pearl Harbor for overhaul and independent ship exercises, Tombigbee was redeployed to WestPac. She arrived at Da Nang on 23 November for further operations in I Corps, supporting the Vietnamese counteroffensive operation. On 22 December, while engaged in these activities, she assisted LCU-1500 which encountered difficulties and was in danger of being swept ashore and foundering in heavy surf. Continuing under the operational command of Naval Support Activity, Danang, Tombigbee carried her support mission of supplying petroleum products for air and ground forces engaged in combat in I Corps through the middle of 1969.

Following a routine return to Pearl Harbor for upkeep and availability, the tanker was again deployed off Vietnam with Service Squadron 5 through 1971, supporting Operation Market Time in the Vietnamese coastal waters, with periodic visits to such ports as Singapore; Kaohsiung, Taiwan; Hong Kong; Brisbane, Australia; and Subic Bay. She also conducted surveillance operations of Soviet warships operating in the vicinity of American forces in the South China Sea.

=== Decommissioning and sale ===
After returning to Pearl Harbor at the end of 1971, Tombigbee was placed in reduced operating status from 1 February 1972. From 31 May to 7 July, the ship underwent inactivation preparations; and, on the latter date, 7 July, the ship was decommissioned at Pearl Harbor and transferred to the Greek Navy.

== Hellenic Navy (1972–2003) ==
Renamed Ariadni (A414) – after the mythical daughter of King Minos who helped Theseus to escape from the labyrinth – the ship served with the Hellenic Navy as a support tanker through 1979. Final Disposition: reported withdrawn from Greek naval service in 2003, fate unknown.

== Military awards and honours ==
In U.S. service, Tombigbee was awarded two battle stars for World War II service: Iwo Jima operation, Okinawa Gunto operation.
She was awarded 11 engagement stars for her service in the Vietnam War:
Vietnamese Counteroffensive, Vietnamese Counteroffensive – Phase II, Vietnamese Counteroffensive – Phase III, Tet Counteroffensive, Vietnamese Counteroffensive – Phase VI, Tet69/Counteroffensive, Vietnam Winter-Spring 1970, Sanctuary Counteroffensive, Consolidation I
Her U.S. crew was eligible for the following medals: China Service Medal (extended), American Campaign Medal, Asiatic–Pacific Campaign Medal (2), World War II Victory Medal, Navy Occupation Service Medal (with Asia clasp), National Defense Service Medal (2), Korean Service Medal, Antarctica Service Medal, Armed Forces Expeditionary Medal (3-Vietnam), Vietnam Service Medal (9), Republic of Vietnam Gallantry Cross Unit Citation (6), United Nations Service Medal, Vietnam Campaign Medal, Korean War Service Medal (retroactive)
