= USS Nemasket =

Patapsco-class gasoline tanker

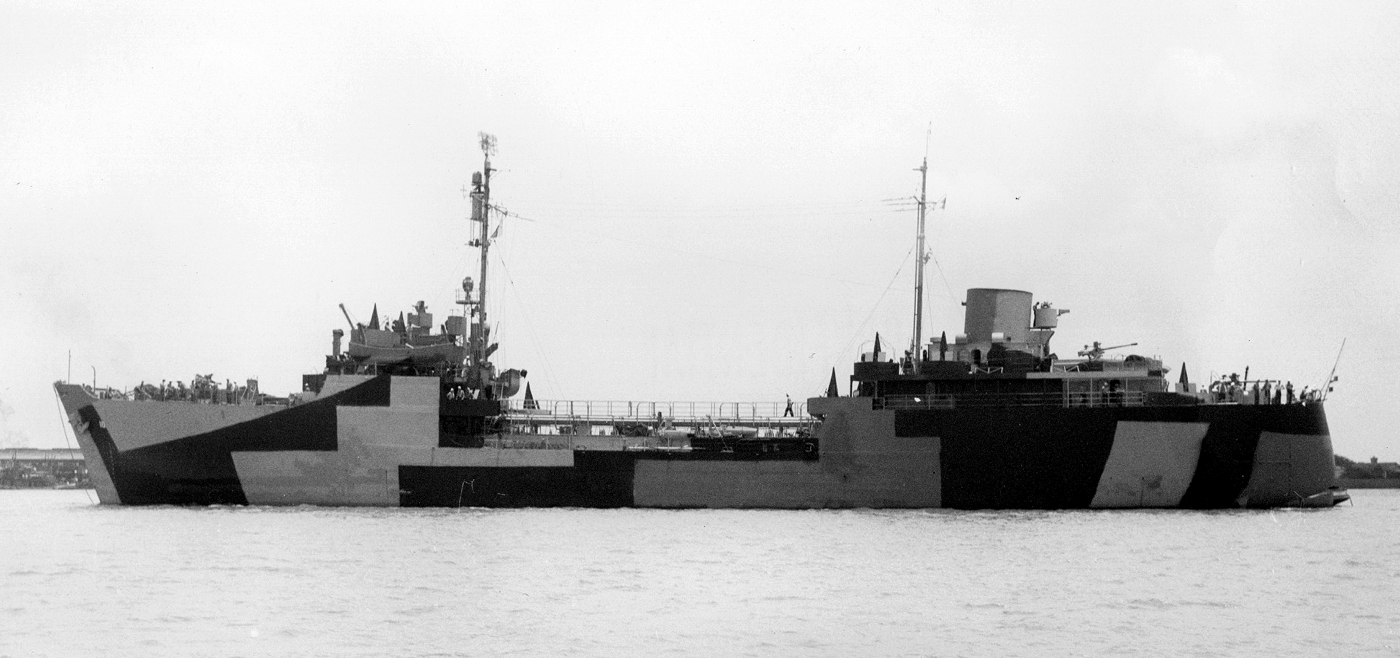

History

United States
- Name: USS Nemasket
- Namesake: Nemasket River in Massachusetts
- Ordered: as T1-MT-M1 tanker hull
- Builder: Cargill, Inc., Savage, Minnesota
- Laid down: 6 October 1942
- Launched: 20 October 1943
- Commissioned: 16 June 1944
- Decommissioned: 22 September 1959
- Stricken: 1 July 1960
- Fate: Disposed of by Scrapping, ESCO Marine, Brownsville, Tx 6 June 2006

General characteristics
- Class & type: Patapsco-class gasoline tanker
- Tonnage: 2,210 tonnes deadweight (DWT)
- Displacement: 1,850 long tons (1,880 t) light; 4,130 long tons (4,196 t) full load
- Length: 310 ft 9 in (94.72 m)
- Beam: 48 ft 6 in (14.78 m)
- Draft: 15 ft 8 in (4.78 m)
- Propulsion: 4 × General Electric diesel-electric engines, twin shafts, 3,300 hp (2,461 kW)
- Speed: 15.5 knots (17.8 mph; 28.7 km/h)
- Complement: 131
- Armament: 4 × 3"/50 caliber guns; 12 × 20 mm AA

Service record
- Operations: World War II; Korean War

USS Nemasket (AOG-10) was a Patapsco-class gasoline tanker in service with the U.S. Navy from 1944 to 1959. She was scrapped in 2006.

== History ==
Nemasket was laid down 6 October 1942 by Cargill, Inc., Savage, Minnesota; launched 20 October 1943; sponsored by Mrs. Rebecca Hanson of Savage, Minnesota; and commissioned 16 June 1944 at New Orleans, Louisiana.

=== World War II ===
Shakedown commenced 3 July in the Chesapeake Bay, after which Nemasket steamed to Aruba, Netherlands West Indies, to load gasoline. She departed Aruba 31 July for Pearl Harbor via the Panama Canal and San Diego, California. Arriving Pearl Harbor 24 August she commenced transporting petroleum products to numerous Pacific islands. Reaching Ulithi 12 November, she commenced fueling operations - receiving fuel from merchant tankers and Navy oilers, and then delivering it to various combatants, auxiliaries, and island bases.

Nemasket carried aviation gasoline to Angaur and Peleliu in the Palau Islands from 12 December 1944 until 18 January 1945. She then steamed to Eniwetok to fuel the invasion fleet preparing for the Iwo Jima assault. Arriving off Iwo Jima 20 February, she fueled over two hundred ships in twenty days. The gasoline tanker then shifted to Saipan and Ulithi 9 March, and 4 April she steamed to Kerama Retto, where she spent three months amidst kamikaze attacks and interminable hours at general quarters. She splashed a "Val" 13 May, 100 yards off her port bow.

At Leyte when hostilities ceased, Nemasket remained in continuous service with the Pacific Service Force. She shifted to Shanghai, China 6 September and remained on China service until May 1947, spending only the late summer and early fall of 1946 in the United States. In June 1947 she was assigned transportation and delivery duties throughout the Pacific islands as a unit of Service Division 51, Service Force, Pacific.

=== Korean War ===
Nemasket continued her transportation and delivery duties during the Korean War and through the 1950s, out of her homeport of Pearl Harbor.

=== Decommissioning and Fate ===
Nemasket was placed out of commission, in reserve 22 September 1959 and stricken from the Naval Register on 1 July 1960. Several sources, including the Dictionary of American Naval Fighting Ships list Nemasket as being scrapped in 1961, those sources are incorrect. Nemasket remained in Navy reserve until 6 June 1971 when she was transferred to the Suisun Bay Reserve Fleet. She was then used as a fleet utility craft (FB-64) until 26 August 2005 when a contract for her dismantling was issued to ESCO Marine of Brownsville, Tx for $1,224,100. Nemasket departed the Suisun Bay Reserve Fleet on 9 January 2006 heading to Brownsville and was completely dismantled by 6 June 2006.

== Military awards and honors ==
Nemasket’s crew was eligible for the following medals and ribbons:

- Combat Action Ribbon (retroactive - April to June 1945 at Kerama Retto, Okinawa)
- China Service Medal
- American Campaign Medal
- Asiatic-Pacific Campaign Medal
- World War II Victory Medal
- Navy Occupation Service Medal (with Asia clasp)
- National Defense Service Medal
- Korean Service Medal
- United Nations Service Medal
- Philippines Liberation Medal
- Republic of Korea War Service Medal (retroactive)
