= USS Maquoketa =

Patapsco-class gasoline tanker

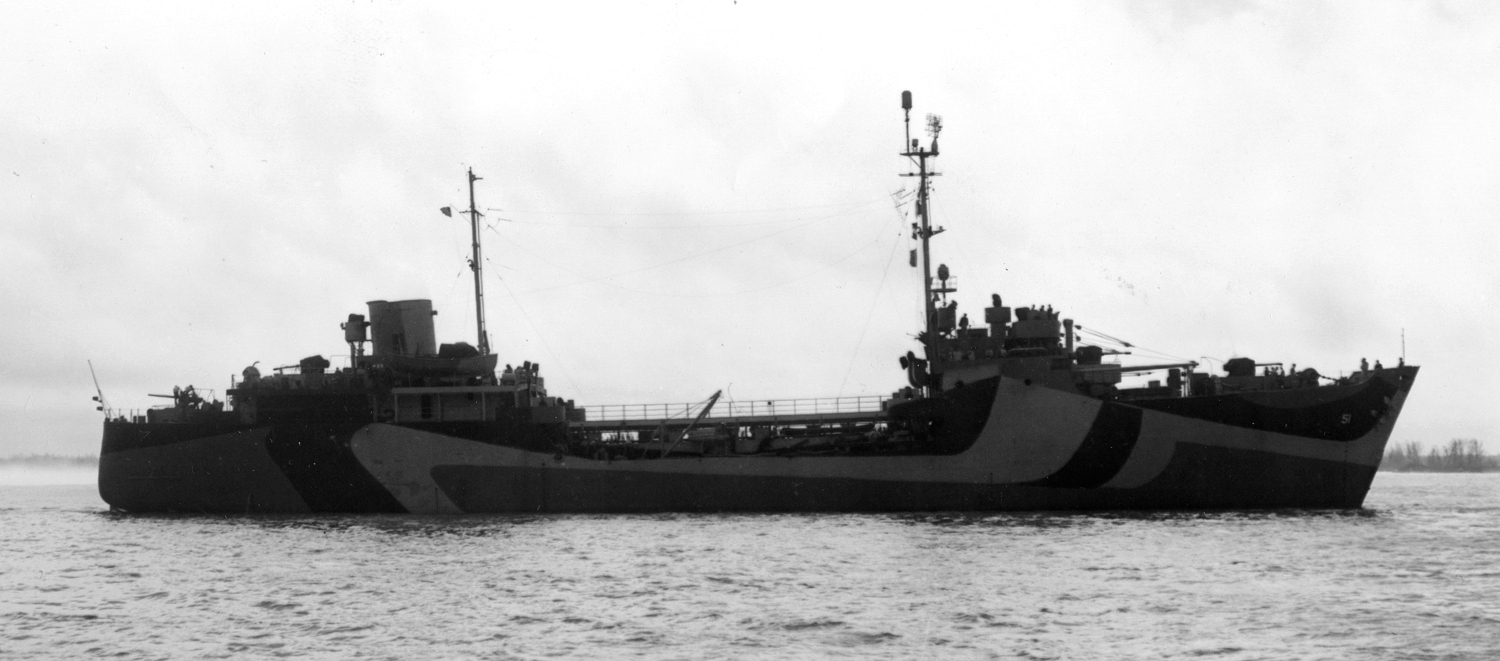

History

United States
- Name: USS Maquoketa
- Namesake: Maquoketa River in Iowa
- Ordered: as T1-MT-M1 tanker hull
- Laid down: 14 January 1944
- Launched: 12 August 1944
- Commissioned: 27 February 1945
- Decommissioned: 21 February 1947
- In service: as USNS Maquoketa (T-AOG-51); 1 March 1952
- Out of service: 9 October 1957
- Stricken: 12 March 1958
- Fate: Disposed of by scrapping 2 December 1975

General characteristics
- Class & type: Patapsco-class gasoline tanker
- Tonnage: 2,120 long tons deadweight (DWT)
- Displacement: 1,846 long tons (1,876 t) light; 4,130 long tons (4,196 t) full load
- Length: 310 ft 9 in (94.72 m)
- Beam: 48 ft 6 in (14.78 m)
- Draft: 15 ft 8 in (4.78 m)
- Propulsion: 4 × General Electric diesel engines, electric drive, twin shafts, 3,300 hp (2,461 kW)
- Speed: 14 knots (16 mph; 26 km/h)
- Complement: 131
- Armament: 4 × 3"/50 caliber guns; 12 × 20 mm AA guns

USS Maquoketa (AOG-51) was a Patapsco-class gasoline tanker in service with the United States Navy from 1945 to 1947 and with the Military Sea Transportation Service from 1952 to 1957. She was sold for scrap in 1975.

== History ==
Maquoketa was laid down 14 January 1944 by Cargill, Inc., Savage, Minnesota; launched 12 August 1944; sponsored by Mrs. Henry E. Benson; and commissioned at New Orleans, Louisiana, 27 February 1945.

=== World War II ===
Following shakedown exercises along the U.S. Gulf Coast, Maquoketa took on aviation gas, diesel oil and lube oil at Houston, Texas, and departed for the Pacific Ocean, 28 March 1945. She arrived in the Marshall Islands 23 May and immediately began discharging her cargo into the waiting ships.

For the next three months the tanker plied regularly between Majuro, Kwajalein, and Tarawa. At Majuro when hostilities ceased, Maquoketa made one more voyage to Kwajalein and then sailed to Ulithi, arriving 29 August. From the Carolines she steamed on to Okinawa, remaining there for 1½ months before continuing to Japan. She moored at Nagasaki 23 October and commenced supplying ships assigned to the occupied areas. During the remainder of her western Pacific deployment she called at most of the ports in the Japanese home islands and in the American zone of Korea in addition to making regularly scheduled visits to Jinsen, Korea, Sasebo, Yokohama, and Nagoya.

=== Post-war operations ===
After operating for 14 months in support of the occupation forces, Maquoketa steamed from Yokosuka 11 November 1946 for the United States, anchoring in San Francisco Bay 4 December. She decommissioned at Mare Island, California, 21 February 1947 and was transferred to the United States Maritime Commission 18 June.

=== Military Sea Transportation Service ===
The next year, because of her speed and military characteristics, she was reacquired by the Navy and placed in the Pacific Reserve Fleet 23 August 1948. Reactivated, she was assigned to Military Sea Transportation Service (MSTS) 1 March 1952, and operated under contract with a civilian crew until 18 May 1954, when she was again placed in reserve. From that date until spring 1956 she was berthed in Florida with the Atlantic Reserve Fleet.

A second tour of civilian-operated service with MSTS began on 24 April 1956 and continued until 16 October 1956, when she was delivered to the Maritime Administration Reserve Fleet, Suisun Bay, California. She remained in custodial status there until activated a third time in 1957. Maquoketa then underwent another tour with MSTS in the Pacific, from 30 April through 9 October 1957. On the latter date, she once more deactivated and was placed in the custody of the Maritime Administration.

=== Final decommissioning and fate ===
On 12 March 1958, she was formally transferred to the National Defense Reserve Fleet and was struck from the Naval Vessel Register the same day. Maquoketa was sold on 2 December 1975 to the National Metal & Steel Corp of Terminal Island, Ca for $132,132.29. Maquoketa was removed from the Suisun Bay Reserve Fleet on 16 December 1975 and was scrapped shortly afterwards.

== Military awards and honors ==
Her crew was eligible for the following medals:

- American Campaign Medal
- Asiatic–Pacific Campaign Medal
- World War II Victory Medal
- Navy Occupation Service Medal (with Asia Clasp)
- National Defense Service Medal
- Philippine Liberation Medal
