= Susquehanna =

Susquehanna may refer to:

== Places in the United States ==
- Susquehanna River, the source of the Chesapeake Bay

=== In Maryland ===
- Susquehanna State Park (Maryland)

=== In Pennsylvania ===
- Susquehannock tribe, Native American tribe of Pennsylvania
- Susquehanna Bank
- Susquehanna County, Pennsylvania
- Susquehanna Depot, Pennsylvania, a borough in Susquehanna County
- Susquehanna Area Regional Airport Authority
- Susquehanna State Park (Pennsylvania)
- Susquehanna Steam Electric Station, a nuclear power plant
- Susquehanna Township, Pennsylvania (disambiguation), several places
- Susquehanna Trails, Pennsylvania, a census-designated place in York County
- Susquehanna University, in Selinsgrove, Pennsylvania
- Sesquehanna Sub Division, in Independence, Missouri

== Music, arts and entertainment ==
- "Susquehanna", an unreleased song by Live recorded during the Throwing Copper sessions
- "Oh, Susquehanna", a song by the band Defiance, Ohio on their 2006 album The Great Depression
- Susquehanna (album), an album by the Cherry Poppin' Daddies
- Susquehanna Radio Corporation, a media corporation from 1941, absorbed into Cumulus Media in 2005
- Drej Queen Susquehana, the main antagonist of the 2000 animated film Titan A.E.

== Companies and organizations ==
- Susquehannah Company, a historical Connecticut company involved in a dispute with Pennsylvania
- Susquehanna International Group, Pennsylvania-based financial services company
- Susquehanna Polling & Research, Pennsylvania-based polling company
- New York, Susquehanna and Western Railway, often called Susquehanna for short

== Vessels ==
- USS Susquehanna, multiple ships

== See also ==
- Susie Q (Susquehanna is also an anagram of the name Susannah Que)
