= USS Chewaucan =

Patapsco-class gasoline tanker

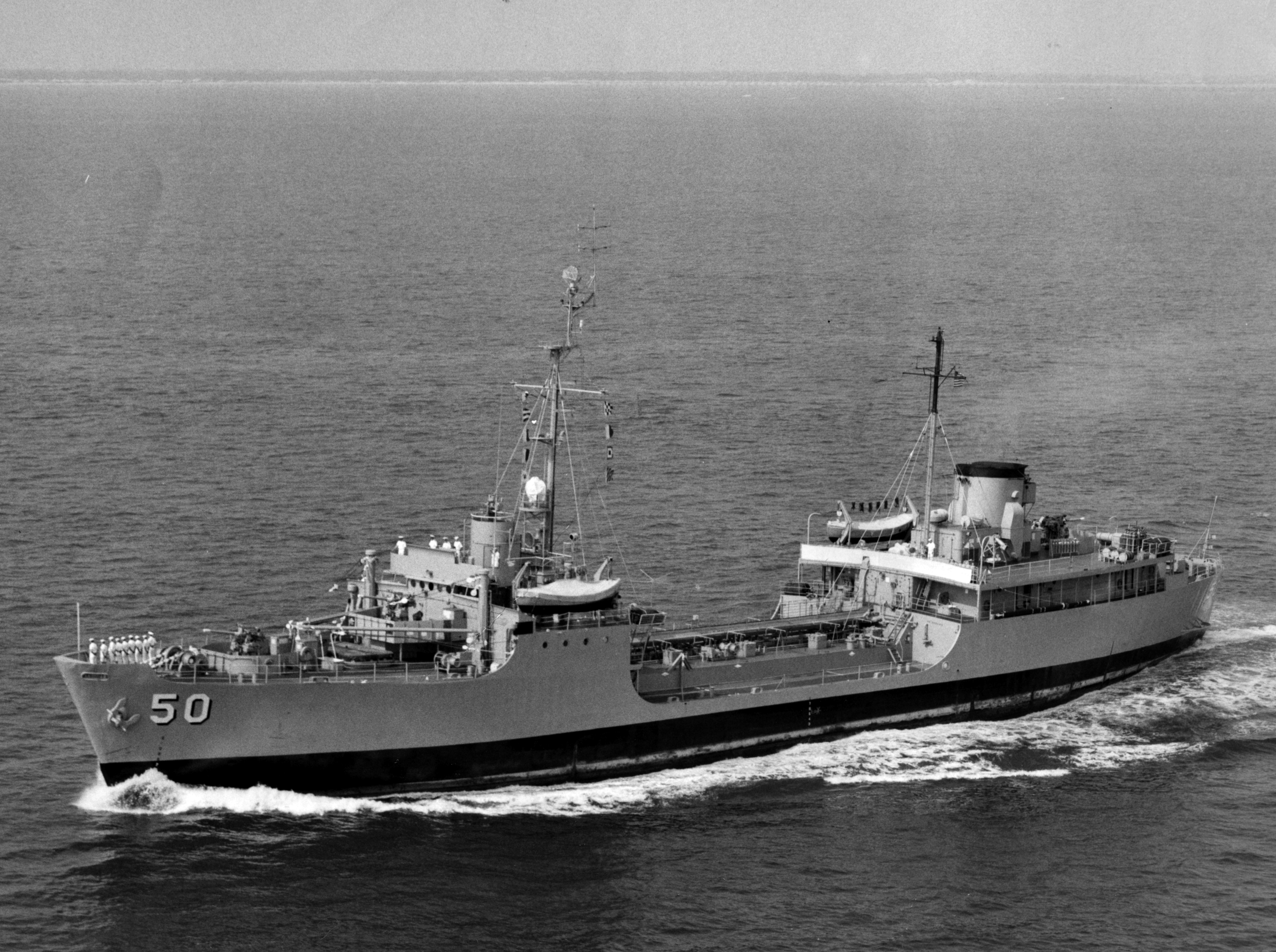

History

United States
- Name: USS Chewaucan
- Namesake: Chewaucan River in Oregon
- Builder: Cargill, Inc., Savage, Minnesota
- Launched: 22 July 1944
- Commissioned: 19 February 1945
- Decommissioned: 1975
- Stricken: 1 July 1975
- Fate: Sold to Colombia, 1 January 1976

History

Colombia
- Name: ARC Tumaco (BT-7)
- Acquired: 1 January 1976

General characteristics
- Class & type: Patapsco-class gasoline tanker
- Tonnage: 2,120 long tons deadweight (DWT)
- Displacement: 1,846 long tons (1,876 t) light; 4,130 long tons (4,196 t) full load
- Length: 310 ft 9 in (94.72 m)
- Beam: 48 ft 6 in (14.78 m)
- Draft: 15 ft 8 in (4.78 m)
- Propulsion: 4 × General Electric diesel engines, electric drive, twin shafts, 3,300 hp (2,461 kW)
- Speed: 14 knots (16 mph; 26 km/h)
- Complement: 131
- Armament: 4 × 3"/50 caliber guns; 12 × 20 mm AA guns

USS Chewaucan (AOG-50) was a Patapsco-class gasoline tanker in service with the United States Navy from 1945 to 1975. She was then transferred to the Colombian Navy, her final disposition being unknown.

== World War II service ==
Chewaucan was launched 22 July 1944 by Cargill, Inc., Savage, Minnesota; sponsored by Mrs. O. K. Greathouse; and commissioned 19 February 1945.

Laden with oil, vital fluid of war, Chewaucan cleared Baytown, Texas, 22 March 1945, and reached Pearl Harbor 6 May. Attached to the Hawaiian Sea Frontier she carried oil among the Hawaiian Islands, Midway, Johnston, Canton, and Christmas Islands until 16 June 1946 when she sailed for San Pedro, California, arriving 25 June.

== Post-war operations ==
Between 23 September 1946 and 4 July 1947, Chewaucan operated out of Seattle, Washington, on cargo duty to various Alaskan ports, then sailed in the Pacific Ocean, calling at Pearl Harbor and Kwajalein and ferrying oil until 6 January 1948. She sailed from San Pedro, California, 8 January 1948 and entered Philadelphia Naval Shipyard 4 February for conversion to a combination oiler-tanker.

== Converted to oiler-tanker ==
Chewaucan put out from Norfolk, Virginia, 7 July 1948 to become one of the original 12 ships of the U.S. 6th Fleet in the Mediterranean. Home ported at Naples, Italy, in support of the 6th Fleet, she remained in the Mediterranean except for periodic overhauls in the United States through 1960.

Her duty changed from direct replenishment of the 6th Fleet to supplying various shore storage facilities when, on 2 August 1957, she was transferred from the 6th Fleet to Commander, Naval Activities, Italy, for operational control.

== Decommissioning ==
Chewaucan was decommissioned (date unknown) and struck from the Naval Register, 1 July 1975. She was sold under the Security Assistance Program to Colombia, 1 January 1976, and renamed ARC Tumaco (BT-7). Final disposition: fate unknown.

== Military awards and honors ==
Her crew was eligible for the following medals:

- American Campaign Medal
- Asiatic-Pacific Campaign Medal
- World War II Victory Medal
- National Defense Service Medal
- Armed Forces Expeditionary Medal
