= USS Mattabesset (AOG-52) =

Patapsco-class gasoline tanker

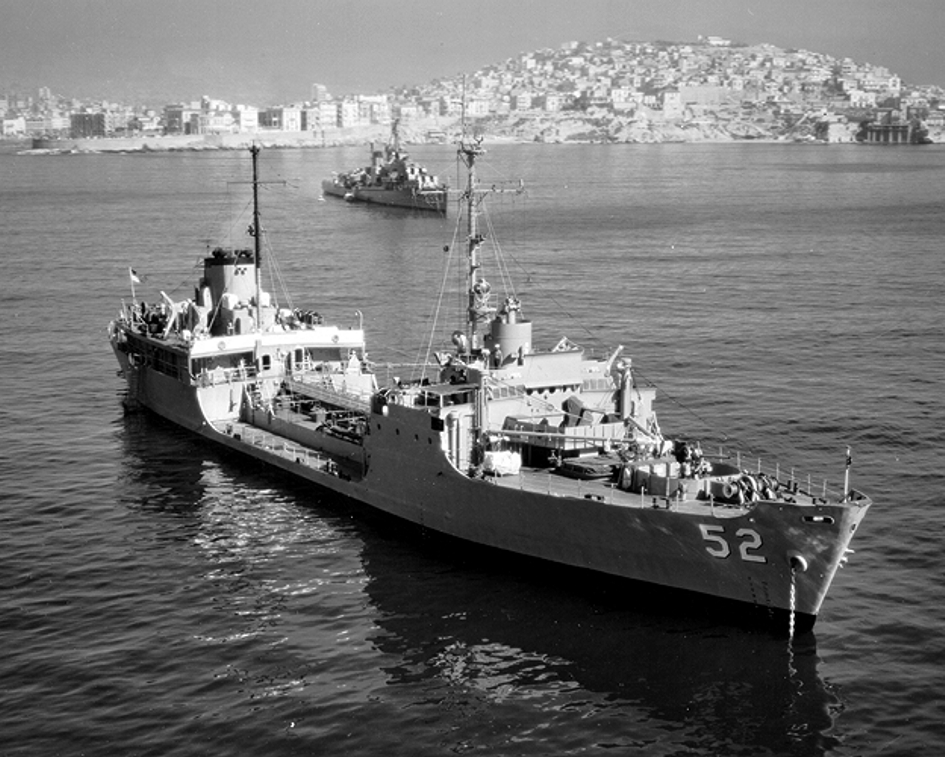

History

United States
- Name: USS Mattabesset
- Namesake: Mattabesset River in Connecticut
- Ordered: as T1-MT-M1 tanker hull
- Builder: Cargill, Inc., Savage, Minnesota
- Laid down: 6 July 1944
- Launched: 11 November 1944
- Commissioned: 16 June 1945
- Stricken: 1 October 1968
- Fate: Disposed of by scrapping; 26 June 1969

General characteristics
- Class & type: Patapsco-class gasoline tanker
- Tonnage: 2,120 long tons deadweight (DWT)
- Displacement: 1,846 long tons (1,876 t) light; 4,130 long tons (4,196 t) full load
- Length: 310 ft 9 in (94.72 m)
- Beam: 48 ft 6 in (14.78 m)
- Draft: 15 ft 8 in (4.78 m)
- Propulsion: 4 × General Electric diesel engines, electric drive, twin shafts, 3,300 hp (2,461 kW)
- Speed: 14 knots (16 mph; 26 km/h)
- Complement: 131
- Armament: 4 × 3"/50 caliber guns; 12 × 20 mm AA guns

USS Mattabesset (AOG-52) was a Patapsco-class gasoline tanker in service with the United States Navy from 1945 to 1968. She was scrapped in 1969.

== History ==
Mattabesset was laid down 6 July 1944 by Cargill, Inc., Savage, Minnesota; launched 11 November 1944; sponsored by Mrs. John Uhrenholdt; and commissioned 16 June 1945.

Mattabesset completed her U.S. Gulf Coast shakedown and departed for the Pacific Ocean area 14 July 1945, having filled her cargo tanks at Baytown, Texas. She arrived at Pearl Harbor a week before the end of hostilities in the Pacific and continued on to Midway Island. On 27 August, having completed delivery of diesel fuel, she sailed for Saipan, where she spent five weeks as a station tanker. She next steamed for Japan, arriving at Yokohama 24 October. For the next month she transferred gasoline from merchant tankers to shore installations. On 9 December, she began shuttling gasoline between shore installations in Japan and Korea, continuing this duty until 7 December 1946, when she got underway for San Pedro, California.

Her scheduled overhaul completed in May 1947, Mattabesset sailed for Norfolk, Virginia, and duty with Service Force, Atlantic Fleet. Arriving 13 June, Mattabesset began a four-year assignment carrying petroleum products to ports along the Atlantic coast, from Greenland and Labrador to the Caribbean, and occasionally across the Atlantic to Casablanca.

Mattabesset departed the U.S. East Coast for her first U.S. 6th Fleet deployment 12 September 1951. Since that time, she has served at least four months a year fueling units engaged in operations and exercises in the Mediterranean. From 1951 until 1955, she returned to the United States only for overhaul. In October 1956, Naples, Italy, became the home port from which she operated until April 1961. On several occasions, including the Lebanon crisis of July 1958, Mattabesset provided direct support for peacekeeping operations.

Mattabesset was assigned a stateside home port, Norfolk, Virginia, in April 1961. Her three Mediterranean deployments between then and 1965 involved her primarily in operations with the 6th Fleet's Amphibious Force, including Operation Steel Pike of 1964, and NATO landing exercises with British, French, and Italian units. Secondary duties were to keep the advanced airbases supplied with aviation gasoline and provide support for units of the 6th Fleet, other than amphibious, whenever called upon.

During July 1965, Mattabesset made a cruise to the North Sea and the Norwegian Sea; and all hands were initiated into the "Order of the Polar Bear" when the ship crossed the Arctic Circle on that cruise. She returned to the Mediterranean three more times between March 1966 and August 1968, again participating in various NATO and 6th Fleet operations. The most notable part of the last deployment was her involvement in the USS Liberty incident.

=== Decommissioning and fate ===
Mattabesset returned to her home port in August 1968. She decommissioned at Norfolk and her name was stricken from the Navy list 1 October 1968. She was then transferred to the Maritime Administration on 26 June 1969 and was sold on the same day to the Peck Iron & Metal Co of Norfolk, Va for $26,863.42. Mattabesset was scrapped a short time later.

== Military awards and honors ==
Her crew was eligible for the following medals:

- American Campaign Medal
- Asiatic-Pacific Campaign Medal
- World War II Victory Medal
- Navy Occupation Service Medal (with Asia clasp)
- National Defense Service Medal
- Armed Forces Expeditionary Medal (4-Lebanon)
