= USS Nespelen =

Patapsco-class gasoline tanker

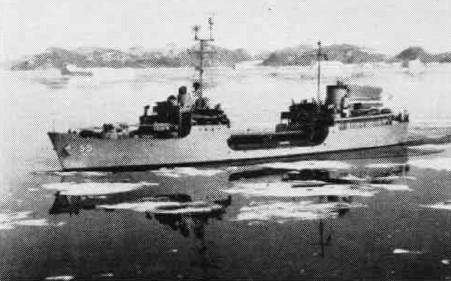
- USS Nespelen in 1955

History

United States
- Name: USS Nespelen
- Namesake: Nespelem River in Washington
- Builder: Cargill Inc.
- Laid down: 28 August 1944
- Launched: 10 April 1945
- Commissioned: 9 August 1945
- Stricken: 1 July 1975
- Fate: Sold for scrap on 24 March 1976

General characteristics
- Class & type: Patapsco-class gasoline tanker
- Displacement: 4,335 long tons (4,405 t) full load
- Length: 310 ft 9 in (94.72 m)
- Beam: 48 ft 6 in (14.78 m)
- Draft: 15 ft 8 in (4.78 m)
- Propulsion: 4 × General Electric diesel-electric engines, twin shafts, 3,300 hp (2.5 MW)
- Speed: 15 knots (17 mph; 28 km/h)
- Capacity: 2,210 long tons (2,250 t) deadweight (DWT)
- Complement: 124 officers and men
- Armament: 4 × 3"/50 caliber guns; 12 × 20 mm AA guns

USS Nespelen (AOG-55) was a Patapsco-class gasoline tanker in the service of the United States Navy.

She was laid down on 28 August 1944 as a Maritime Commission type (T1-MT-M1) tanker hull, under a Maritime Commission contract, at Cargill, Inc. in Savage, Minnesota. Launched on 10 April 1945, she was commissioned on 9 August 1945 at Naval Repair Base, Algiers, Louisiana.

== 1940s ==
After shakedown off Galveston, Texas, the new gasoline tanker took on a load of diesel fuel and departed for Cuba. She arrived at Guantanamo Bay on 26 September 1945, unloaded her cargo, and proceeded to Havana. Remaining in Cuban waters, she made four shuttle trips between Havana and Guantanamo Bay between 4 October and 11 November. Then Nespelen made a turn-about trip to Port Arthur, Texas, returning to Guantanamo Bay on 22 November with a full load of motor gasoline. Following a short repair period, she steamed to Aruba for a cargo of diesel oil and then proceeded to Boston.

Arriving Boston on 9 December, she was drydocked for repairs to her auxiliary engines and port propeller. She then steamed to Newfoundland, reaching Argentia on Christmas Day. She operated in the Newfoundland area until sailing on 26 February 1946 for Bermuda, stopping en route at Melville, Rhode Island and Bayonne, New Jersey to load diesel oil to be delivered to the U.S. Navy Base, St. George, Bermuda. After a three-day stop-over she returned to Newfoundland via Marcus Hook, Pennsylvania. For the next year and one half she carried gasoline and diesel oil between Argentia and St. John's, Newfoundland; Melville, Rhode Island; Aruba; and Trinidad.

Remaining with Service Force, Atlantic Fleet, she continued operations up and down the Atlantic seaboard. Then duties took Nespelen to such ports as Narsarssuak, Greenland; Terceira Island in the Azores; Lake Melville, Labrador; Casablanca, French Morocco; Thule, Greenland; Halifax, Nova Scotia; Godthab, Greenland and Resolute Bay in addition to numerous east coast ports.

== 1950s ==
In November 1952 orders arrived sending the oiler to the Mediterranean and the United States Sixth Fleet. She visited such ports as Malta; Bari and Naples, Italy; Casablanca and Marseilles.

On 3 January 1953 Nespelen slipped her moorings and continued on to Golfe-Juan and then sailed to Tripoli, Oran, Naples, Augusta Bay, Sicily and back to Tripoli where she moored on 8 February. She operated out of Tripoli until 19 March at which time she got underway for Bari; Phaleron Bay, Greece; Larnaca, Cyprus; Malta and Gibraltar, her last stop in the Mediterranean before sailing 14 April 1953 for the United States, arriving Norfolk on the 26th. She steamed up and down the East Coast, travelling as far north as Thule, Greenland and as far south as Bermuda until February 1954. She was then assigned another tour of duty in the Mediterranean and revisited the previous ports and such new ones as Iskenderun, Turkey; Genoa and Naples, Italy; Sete and St. Louis du Rhone, France before heading home in June.

In January 1955 she departed Norfolk for Gibraltar and a third tour of duty with the 6th Fleet which lasted until May, when she returned to the United States and Norfolk. In the fall and winter of 1955–1956, Nespelen participated in Operation Deep Freeze, a scientific expedition into the frozen wastes of Antarctica.

In the years that followed Nespelen resumed her pattern of operations: alternating duty carrying fuel from ports in the Caribbean and on the East Coast to bases in the far northern Atlantic with deployments in the Mediterranean supporting the 6th Fleet. In the summer of 1969 she headed back to the volatile Mediterranean to support American sea strength through the end of the year.

== Fate ==
Nespelen was laid up in the Reserve Fleet at Naval Amphibious Base Little Creek, Virginia, and struck from the Naval Vessel Register on 1 July 1975. Transferred to the Maritime Administration for disposal, she was sold on 24 March 1976 to Union Minerals & Alloys for scrapping.
