= Polaris Reef =

Reef in Nunavut, Canada

Coordinates: 63°43′25″N 68°30′47″W

Polaris Reef is a reef, or shallows, in Frobisher Bay, near Iqaluit, Nunavut, Canada.

== See also ==
- USS Wacissa (AOG-59)
