= USS Rio Grande =

Patapsco-class gasoline tanker

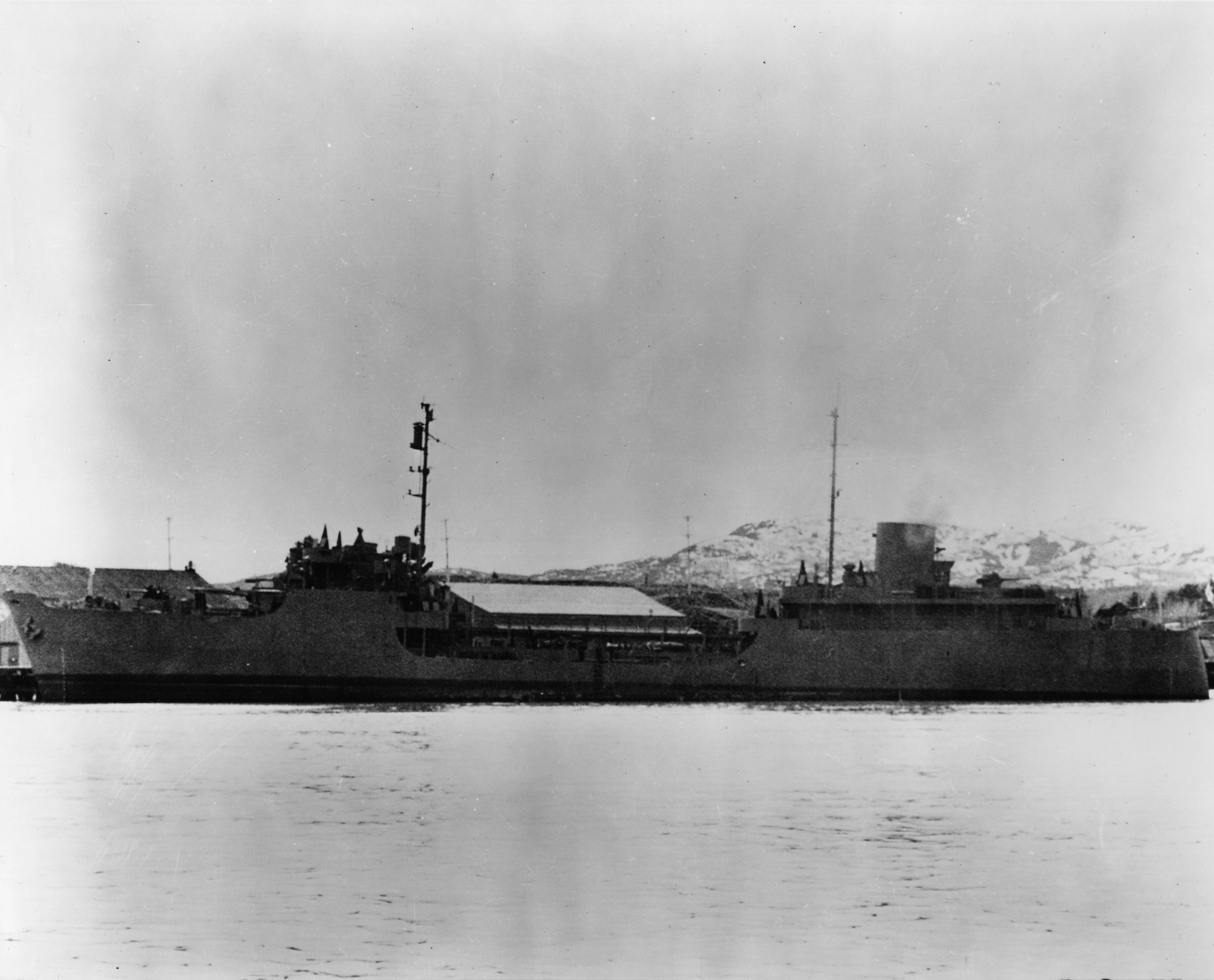

History

United States
- Name: USS Rio Grande
- Namesake: Rio Grande in Colorado, New Mexico, and Texas
- Ordered: as T1-MT-M1 tanker hull
- Builder: Seattle-Tacoma Shipbuilding Corporation
- Laid down: 30 June 1942
- Launched: 23 September 1942
- Commissioned: 10 April 1943
- Decommissioned: 28 June 1946
- In service: 12 October 1950
- Out of service: 6 January 1956
- Stricken: 1 July 1960
- Fate: Sold for scrapping, 7 February 1972

General characteristics
- Class & type: Patapsco-class gasoline tanker
- Tonnage: 2,210 long tons deadweight (DWT)
- Displacement: 1,850 long tons (1,880 t) light; 4,130 long tons (4,196 t) full load
- Length: 310 ft 9 in (94.72 m)
- Beam: 48 ft 6 in (14.78 m)
- Draft: 15 ft 8 in (4.78 m)
- Propulsion: 4 × General Electric diesel-electric engines, twin shafts, 3,300 hp (2,461 kW)
- Speed: 15.5 knots (17.8 mph; 28.7 km/h)
- Complement: 131
- Armament: 4 × 3"/50 caliber guns; 12 × 20 mm AA

Service record
- Operations: World War II, Korean War

USS Rio Grande (AOG-3) was a Patapsco-class gasoline tanker in service with the United States Navy from 1943 to 1946 and 1950–1956. She was scrapped in 1972.

== World War II service ==
Gasoline tanker Rio Grande was laid down 30 June 1942 by Seattle-Tacoma Shipbuilding Corporation, Seattle, Washington; launched 23 September 1942; sponsored by Mrs. R. D. Kirkpatrick; and commissioned 10 April 1943.

Following shakedown Rio Grande was assigned to the U.S. Pacific Fleet as a unit of the mobile support group and carried petroleum products to help provide the lifeline of fuel for the fighting ships of the fleet in their advance toward Japan. After the end of World War II, she continued to operate with Service Force, Pacific Fleet until she decommissioned 28 June 1946.

== Post-war activity ==
In April 1948, she was transferred to Norfolk, Virginia, and placed in the Atlantic Reserve Fleet.

== Reactivated during Korean War ==
Rio Grande recommissioned 12 October 1950. Early the next year she resumed her mission of providing petroleum logistic support in the mid-Pacific. In September 1952 she began seven months of service in the western Pacific, supplying gasoline and diesel oil to United Nations forces in Japan and Korea, with an occasional run to French Indochina. She returned to Pearl Harbor in May 1953 and resumed her fueling duties there. The following March she sailed for Alaskan waters and seven weeks of service transporting fuel between Shemya Island and the Alaskan mainland before returning to the mid-Pacific.

== Decommissioning ==
Rio Grande decommissioned at San Diego, California, 6 January 1956. On 30 June 1960 she entered the Maritime Administration Reserve Fleet at Puget Sound, Olympia, Washington, where she remained until sold for scrapping on 7 February 1972 to General Metals, Tacoma, Washington. Her bell is located in the navy wing of the ROTC building at Texas A&M University.

== Military awards and honors ==
Rio Grande’s Navy crew members were eligible for the following medals:

- China Service Medal (extended)
- American Campaign Medal
- Asiatic-Pacific Campaign Medal
- World War II Victory Medal
- Navy Occupation Service Medal (with Asia clasp)
- National Defense Service Medal
- Korean Service Medal
- United Nations Service Medal
- Republic of Korea War Service Medal (retroactive)
