= Susquehanna Township =

Susquehanna Township may refer to the following places:

- Susquehanna Township, Lycoming County, Pennsylvania
- Susquehanna Township, Juniata County, Pennsylvania
- Susquehanna Township, Dauphin County, Pennsylvania
- Susquehanna Township, Cambria County, Pennsylvania
- Susquehanna Township, Hutchinson County, South Dakota

== See also ==
- Susquehanna (disambiguation)
