= USS Pecatonica =

Patapsco-class gasoline tanker

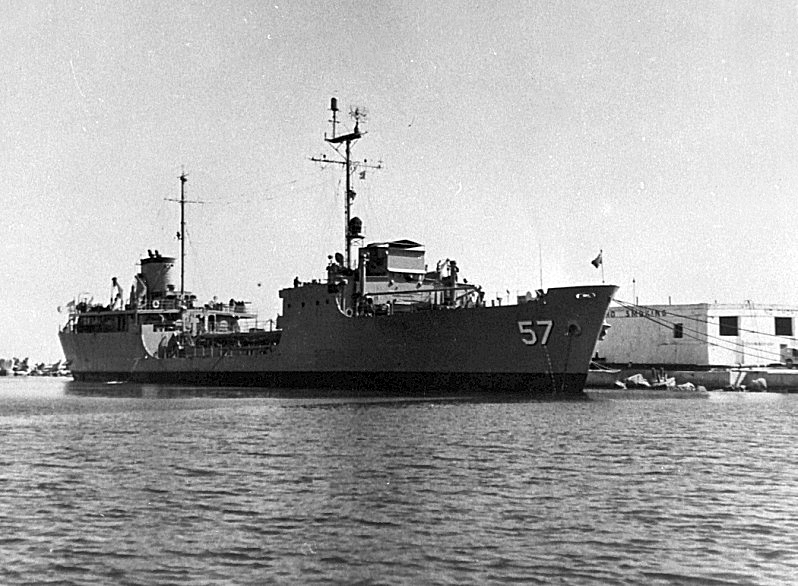

History

United States
- Name: Pecatonica
- Namesake: Pecatonica River, Illinois
- Builder: Cargill Inc.
- Laid down: 6 December 1944
- Launched: 17 March 1945
- Commissioned: 28 November 1945
- Decommissioned: 1 April 2005 (Final)
- In service: 1945
- Out of service: 2005 (Final)
- Stricken: 15 April 1976
- Identification: Hull number=AOG-57; Ship International Radio Callsign: NDAL
- Fate: Decommissioned

General characteristics
- Class & type: Patapsco-class gasoline tanker
- Displacement: 1,846 t.(light), 4,335 t.(full)
- Length: 310 ft 9 in (94.72 m)
- Beam: 48 ft 6 in (14.78 m)
- Draft: 15 ft 8 in (4.78 m)
- Propulsion: 4 × 980 hp (730 kW) GM 16-278A diesel-electric engines
- Speed: 14 knots (26 km/h; 16 mph)
- Complement: 8 officers, 116 enlisted
- Armament: 4 × 3 in (76 mm) DP mounts; 12 × single 20 mm AA mounts

USS Pecatonica (AOG-57) was a Patapsco-class gasoline tanker in service with the United States Navy from 1945 to 1946 and from 1948 to 1961. She was then transferred to the Taiwanese Navy where she served as ROCS Chang Pei (AOG-307/AOG-507) until 2005.

== History ==
=== United States Navy (1945–1961) ===
USS Pecatonica was laid down as a Maritime Commission type (T1-MT-M1) tanker hull under a Maritime Commission contract at Cargill Inc. on 6 December 1944, she was launched by 17 March 1945. She was commissioned on 28 November 1945 at New Orleans, Louisiana.

She departed New Orleans on 11 December 1945 and sailed to Naval Station Norfolk, Virginia arriving the on 16th and remained there until her decommissioning on 7 February 1946 and entered the Atlantic Fleet in Reserve. On 24 April 1948 Pecatonica recommissioned at Naval Station Norfolk. Following shakedown, she conducted coastal logistic voyages along the Eastern Seaboard, making occasional trips to the Caribbean, through 1951.

Pecatonica was assigned to U.S. 6th Fleet in the Mediterranean in March 1952, remaining there until December. She returned to the United States in February 1953, after a year of supplying aviation fuel to U.S. 6th Fleet carriers and U.S. Air Force installations and a training exercise in the Caribbean. She went into the dockyards at NAVSTA Norfolk so that newer 3-inch guns could be fitted. She commenced operations in June to return to the Mediterranean for her second tour with the 6th Fleet.

Pecatonica made deployments to the Mediterranean in September 1953, March 1954, May 1955 and December 1955. In June 1956 she returned to Norfolk and operational control of Service Force Atlantic, providing logistic support for Mutual Defense Assistance Pact convoys, composed of MSOs, MSCs, AMSs, LSMs, and LSMRs, during their training cruises. She served in this capacity through 1960.

=== Republic of China Navy (1961–2005) ===
Early in 1961 Pecatonica shifted to the Pacific and was decommissioned on 24 April 1961 at Tsoying, Taiwan. She transferred the same day to the Republic of China Navy, under loan through MDAP, and served into 1970 as ROCS Chang Pei (AOG–307), and later re-designated AOG-507. Following 35 years of service to the Republic of China, she was decommissioned on 1 April 2005 at Kaohsiung, Taiwan. Her current disposition is unknown.

== Awards ==
- World War II Victory Medal
- American Campaign Medal
- National Defense Service Medal
