= USS Wabash (AOG-4) =

Patapsco-class gasoline tanker

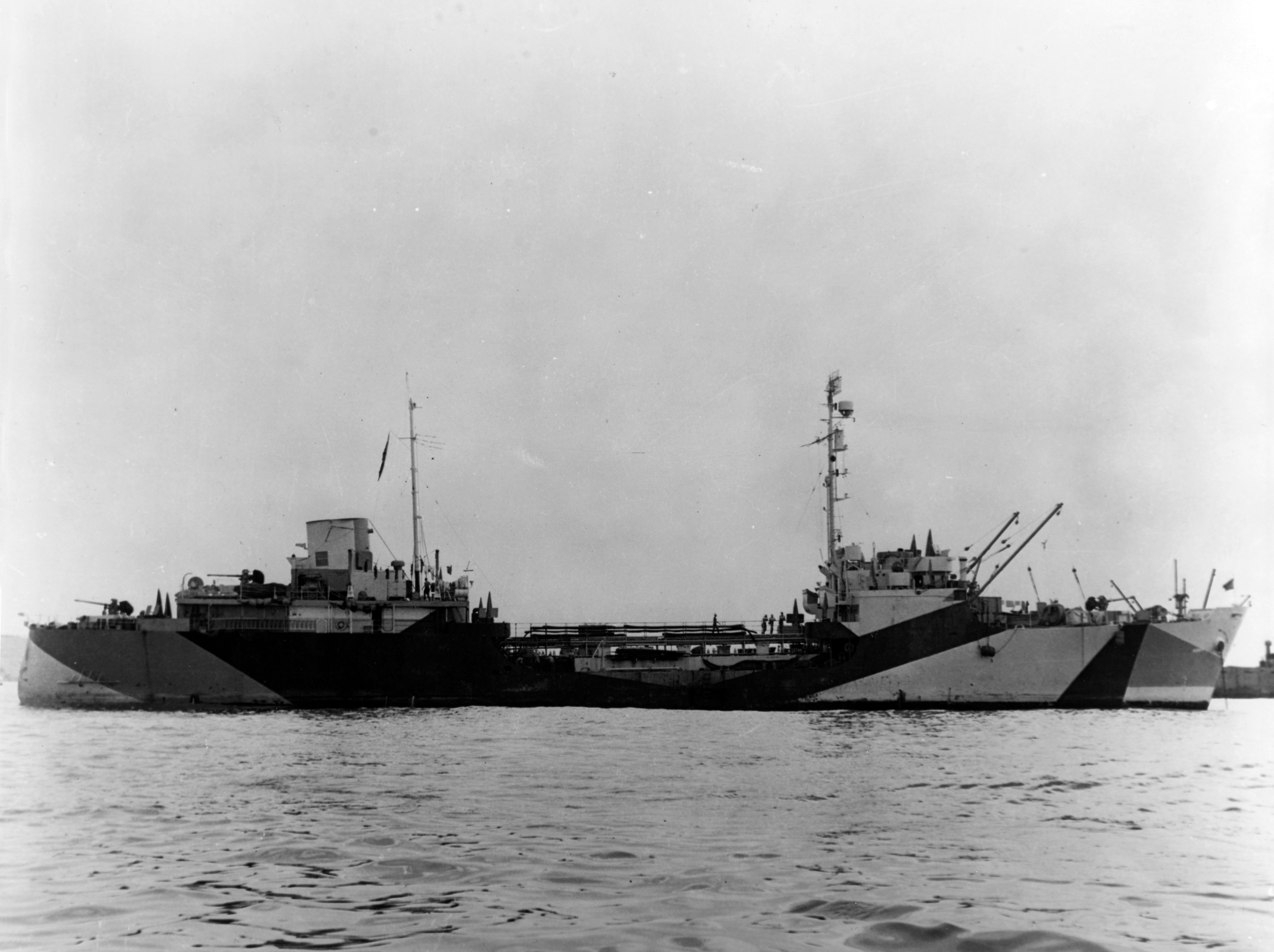
- USS Wabash

History

United States
- Name: USS Wabash
- Namesake: Wabash River
- Builder: Seattle-Tacoma Shipbuilding Corporation
- Laid down: 30 June 1942
- Launched: 28 October 1942
- Commissioned: 10 May 1943
- Decommissioned: 29 July 1946
- Stricken: 23 April 1947
- Fate: Transferred to the US Army Transportation Corps
- Recommissioned: 1 June 1950, as T-AOG-4
- Decommissioned: 10 September 1957
- Stricken: 8 May 1958
- Fate: Disposed of by scrapping at Brownsville, Texas on 27 January 2006

General characteristics
- Class & type: Patapsco-class gasoline tanker
- Displacement: 4,335 long tons (4,405 t) full load
- Length: 310 ft 9 in (94.72 m)
- Beam: 48 ft 6 in (14.78 m)
- Draft: 15 ft 8 in (4.78 m)
- Propulsion: 4 × General Electric diesel-electric engines, twin shafts, 3,300 hp (2,461 kW)
- Speed: 14 knots (16 mph; 26 km/h)
- Complement: 140
- Armament: 4 × 3"/50 caliber guns; 12 × 20 mm AA

Service record
- Operations: World War II, Korean War
- Awards: 2 battle stars (World War II); 2 battle stars (Korea)

USS Wabash (AOG-4) was a Patapsco-class gasoline tanker acquired by the U.S. Navy for the dangerous task of transporting gasoline to warships in the fleet, and to remote Navy stations.

Wabash was laid down on 30 June 1942 at Seattle, Washington, by the Seattle-Tacoma Shipbuilding Co.; launched on 28 October 1942; sponsored by Mrs. Louis A. Puckett; and was commissioned at the Puget Sound Navy Yard, Bremerton, Washington, on 10 May 1943.

== World War II Pacific Theatre operations ==
Wabash departed Seattle, Washington, on 26 May for Alaskan waters. After delivering a cargo of gasoline to Annette Bay and Yakutat, the gasoline tanker returned to Seattle on 5 June. She made four more voyages carrying fuel to Alaskan ports before 15 September, when she headed south for the last time to San Francisco, California.

Proceeding to Hawaii soon thereafter, Wabash was assigned to Service Squadron (ServRon) 8 upon her arrival at Pearl Harbor on 19 October. From then through the first half of 1944, she made runs in the Central Pacific carrying high-test aviation gasoline and lubricants to Palmyra Island, Canton, and Midway Island. Departing Pearl Harbor on 9 July, Wabash steamed in convoy for the Marshall Islands. Transferred to ServRon 10 upon her arrival at Eniwetok on 18 July, Wabash pumped gasoline and lubricants to station tanker YOG-185; tended small craft; and carried Marine Corps equipment to Roi Island before moving on to the Marianas.

== Supporting Iwo Jima operations ==
Arriving at Saipan on 20 August 1944, she operated in the Marianas until sailing for the Volcano Islands on 5 March 1945 to support the American conquest of Iwo Jima. There, Wabash furnished fuel and lubricants to amphibious ships of Task Force 53, including minecraft and tank landing ships. On 14 March, she returned via Saipan to the Western Carolines and arrived at Ulithi on the 27th.

== Supporting Okinawa operations ==
Wabash soon got underway again to support her second major Pacific Ocean operation, the battle for Okinawa. Soon after her arrival off Hagushi beach on 9 April, she began tending miscellaneous small craft at Okinawa through the cessation of hostilities and the first months following Japan's surrender.

== Post-World War II activities ==
On 28 November, she sailed for Hong Kong. From December 1945 to the summer of 1946, Wabash operated in the Far East supporting the Fleet in its occupation duties. She served as tender and fuel ship at Hong Kong; Hainan Island, French Indochina; Subic Bay, Philippines; and at Shanghai and Qingdao, China.

== Decommissioning ==
Decommissioned at Qingdao on 29 July 1946, Wabash was transferred to the Army Transportation Corps on that day and was struck from the Navy list on 23 April 1947.

== Redesignated T-AOG-4 ==
Manned and officered by Japanese, the tanker operated for the U.S. Army out of Yokosuka, Japan, into 1950. With the onset of the Korean War, Wabash was reinstated on the Navy list on 1 June 1950; enrolled in the Military Sea Transportation Service (MSTS); and designated T-AOG-4.

== Korean War service ==
During the Korean War, the ship supported United Nations air operations with vital cargoes of jet fuel and gasoline through the year 1952. Manned by a mixed crew of Americans and Japanese, Wabash served MSTS through the s:Korean Armistice Agreement in the summer of 1953 and subsequently carried oil between Iwo Jima and South Korean and Japanese ports through the mid-1950s.

== Deactivation and fate ==
Inactivated on 10 September 1957, Wabash was struck from the Navy list for the second time on 8 May 1958, placed in permanent custody of the Maritime Administration, and assigned to the National Defense Reserve Fleet at Suisun Bay, California. Wabash was used as a fleet utility craft (FB-65) until 22 June 2005 when a contract for her dismantling was issued to Marine Metals of Brownsville, Texas for $1,366,580. Wabash departed the Suisun Bay Reserve Fleet on 7 September 2005 heading to Brownsville and was completely dismantled by 27 January 2006.

== Awards ==
Wabash received two battle stars for her World War II service and two for service during the Korean War. Her crew was eligible for the following medals:

- China Service Medal (extended)
- American Campaign Medal
- Asiatic-Pacific Campaign Medal (2)
- World War II Victory Medal
- Navy Occupation Service Medal (with Asia clasp)
- National Defense Service Medal
- Korean Service Medal (2)
- United Nations Service Medal
- Republic of Korea War Service Medal (retroactive)
