= USS Natchaug =

Patapsco-class gasoline tanker

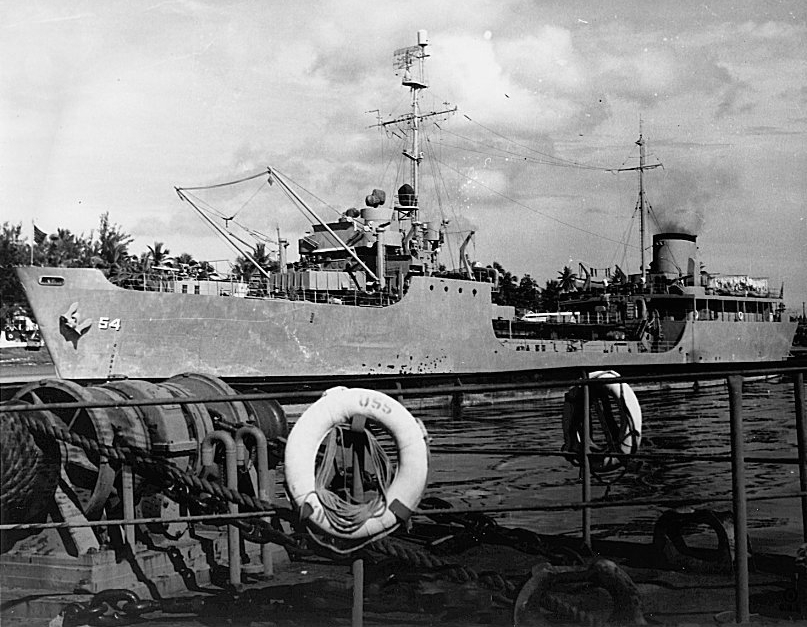

History

United States
- Name: USS Natchaug
- Namesake: Natchaug River in Connecticut
- Builder: Cargill, Inc.
- Laid down: 15 August 1944
- Launched: 6 December 1944
- Commissioned: 19 July 1945
- In service: 1945
- Out of service: 2003 (Final)
- Fate: Sold to Greek Navy, then decommissioned 2003, sunk 2005
- Notes: Ship International Radio Callsign: NCZN

General characteristics
- Class & type: Patapsco-class gasoline tanker
- Displacement: 1,846 t.(light), 4,335 t.(full)
- Length: 310 feet 9 inches
- Beam: 48 feet, 6 inches
- Draft: 15 feet 8 inches
- Propulsion: four 980 hp GM 16-278A Diesel-electric engines
- Speed: 14 Knots
- Complement: 8 Officers, 116 Enlisted
- Armament: 4 3 in (76 mm) DP mounts, 12 single 20 mm AA Mounts

USS Natchaug (AOG-54) was a Patapsco-class gasoline tanker in service with the United States Navy from 1945 to 1959. She was directly transferred to the Greek Navy as Arethousa (A-377). The ship served a total of about 47 years in military service. Decommissioned in 2003, she was sunk as a target in 2005.

== History ==
=== United States Navy (1945-1959) ===
Natchaug was laid down on 15 August 1944 as a Maritime Commission type (T1-MT-M1) tanker hull, under a Maritime Commission contract, at Cargill, Inc. Launched on 6 December 1944, she was commissioned into naval service on 16 July 1945. After her shakedown cruise on the Gulf Coast, Natchaug arrived at Port Arthur, Texas in late August and took on her first cargo, getting underway on the 28th. On 30 September, she arrived at Pearl Harbor and commenced shuttle runs to Hawaiian ports and to islands of the Central Pacific on 5 October. She would continue these runs into 1946.

In January 1947, she was dispatched on an emergency run to supply Wake Island with bulk petroleum after the fuel lines and causeway between that island and Wilkes were damaged. At the end of the month, she returned to supplying fuel and lubricants to Midway Island, Canton Island, and the Christmas Islands. She arrived 2 September at Guam to support bases in a similar support of the bases in Marshalls, Marianas and Carolines. Operating from Guam, she would service these bases up until 18 February 1948. Assigned to SERVRON 3, She provided support for Qingdao and Yokosuka, until returning to Guam on 3 April, her mission extended to include bases in the Palaus and the Admiralties.

Spending the first quarter of 1949 undergoing overhaul in San Francisco, California, she once again returned to Guam on 16 May 1949 as part of SERVDIV 51; with the Japanese Home Islands added to her mission of mobile fleet and base replenishment, serving COMNAV Marianas until the Spring of 1951, when she was reassigned SERVRON 3 to provide support for units within U.S. 7th Fleet, Task Force 90, and Task Force 95 in the Sasebo, Japan area.

Between 14 March and 21 July 1951, she replenished returning Allied ships headed to Japan from the Korean Combat Zone, sailing once to Soehtong Do within the zone. Upon leaving Japanese waters, operating out of Guam once again briefly before sailing to Pearl Harbor once more. She continued to serve bases in the Central and South Pacific Ocean up until February 1953, before steaming north to provide support for units in the Alaskan Sea Frontier. Operating from Adak, she sailed Alaskan waters to mid-May, before sailing back to Pearl Harbor, via Seattle and San Francisco, arriving 22 June to resume her duties.

In February 1955, Natchaug's supply runs coming from Pearl Harbor were once more halted by a Convoy Routing Exercise which stopped at Subic Bay, Philippines on 21 February. She then supplied petroleum to ships and bases in the Philippine and Formosa area until the end of June. She returned to Hawaii on 28 July after a visit to Hong Kong, China, resuming her duty of supplying Central and South Pacific bases.

=== Greek Navy (1959-2005) ===
On 23 February 1959, she was ordered for inactivation, and was decommissioned on 24 July 1959, and transferred to the Hellenic Navy under the Military Assistance Program. She was struck from the Naval Register on 1 August 1959, and she was renamed as Arethousa (A-377). Serving a total of 44 years in the Hellenic Navy, she was decommissioned for the second and last time in 2003, and spent 2 years awaiting disposal. She was disposed of as a floating target off Crete Island in 2005.

== Ship Awards ==
- World War II Victory Medal
- American Campaign Medal
- National Defense Service Medal
- United Nations Service Medal
- Republic of Korea War Service Medal (retroactive)
- Korean Service Medal
- China Service Medal (Extended)
- Navy Occupation Service Medal (With Asia clasp)
- USS Natchaug received one battle star for Korean War service
