= Patapsco-class gasoline tanker =

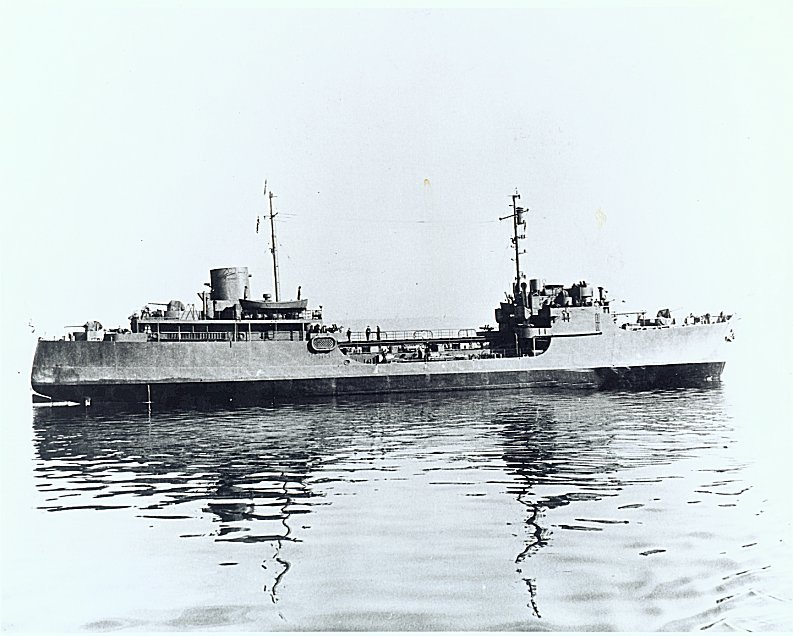
- USS Patapsco (AOG-1)

Class overview
- Name: Patapsco class
- Builders: Seattle-Tacoma Shipbuilding Corporation; Cargill Inc.
- Operators: United States Navy
- Built: 1942–1945
- In commission: 1943–1960s
- Completed: 23
- Active: 1 in commercial service as a fishing vessel

General characteristics
- Type: Gasoline tanker
- Displacement: 1,850 long tons (1,880 t) light; 4,130 long tons (4,196 t) full load
- Length: 310 ft 9 in (94.72 m)
- Beam: 48 ft 6 in (14.78 m)
- Draft: 15 ft 6 in (4.72 m)
- Propulsion: 4 × Cleveland Diesel 12-278A diesel-electric engines, twin shafts, 3,300 hp (2,461 kW)
- Speed: 15.5 knots (17.8 mph; 28.7 km/h)
- Capacity: 1,850 long tons (1,880 t) dwt
- Complement: 131
- Sensors & processing systems: SC radar
- Armament: 4 × 3"/50 caliber guns; 12 × 20 mm AA guns

The Patapsco class of gasoline tankers were a class of tankers built for the United States Navy during World War II. The class consisted of 23 tankers, designated AOG-1 through AOG-11, and AOG-48 to AOG-59. They served through the Korean War and several served in foreign navies.

== Production ==
Many were built as Maritime Commission type T1-MT-M1 tanker hull, under a Maritime Commission contract, at Cargill, Inc., Savage, Minnesota.

== Propulsion ==
Four 980 shaft horsepower (730 kW) Cleveland Diesel Engine Division 12-278A diesel-electric engines, single main reduction gears, two propellers, for a total 3,300 shp (2,500 kW).

== Service ==
Various ships in the class served from World War II through the Vietnam War in various campaigns. Some were transferred to the Greek Navy and Taiwan. The last ones in U.S. service were decommissioned in July 1975. Taiwan decommissioned the last one, ROCS Chang Pei (AOG-517), in 2005.

Patapsco was converted into a fishing trawler after its naval service and renamed Arctic Storm. As of 2019 it is still active, and the only known surviving member of its class.

== Ships ==
- Seattle-Tacoma Shipbuilding Corporation
  - USS Patapsco (AOG-1)
  - USS Kern (AOG-2)
  - USS Rio Grande (AOG-3)
  - USS Wabash (AOG-4)
  - USS Susquehanna (AOG-5)
- Cargill
  - USS Agawam (AOG-6)
  - USS Elkhorn (AOG-7)
  - USS Genesee (AOG-8)
  - USS Kishwaukee (AOG-9)
  - USS Nemasket (AOG-10)
  - USS Tombigbee (AOG-11)
  - USS Chehalis (AOG-48)
  - USS Chestatee (AOG-49)
  - USS Chewaucan (AOG-50)
  - USS Maquoketa (AOG-51)
  - USS Mattabesset (AOG-52)
  - USS Namakagon (AOG-53)
  - USS Natchaug (AOG-54)
  - USS Nespelen (AOG-55)
  - USS Noxubee (AOG-56)
  - USS Pecatonica (AOG-57)
  - USS Pinnebog (AOG-58)
  - USS Wacissa (AOG-59)
