= USS Susquehanna (AOG-5) =

Patapsco-class gasoline tanker

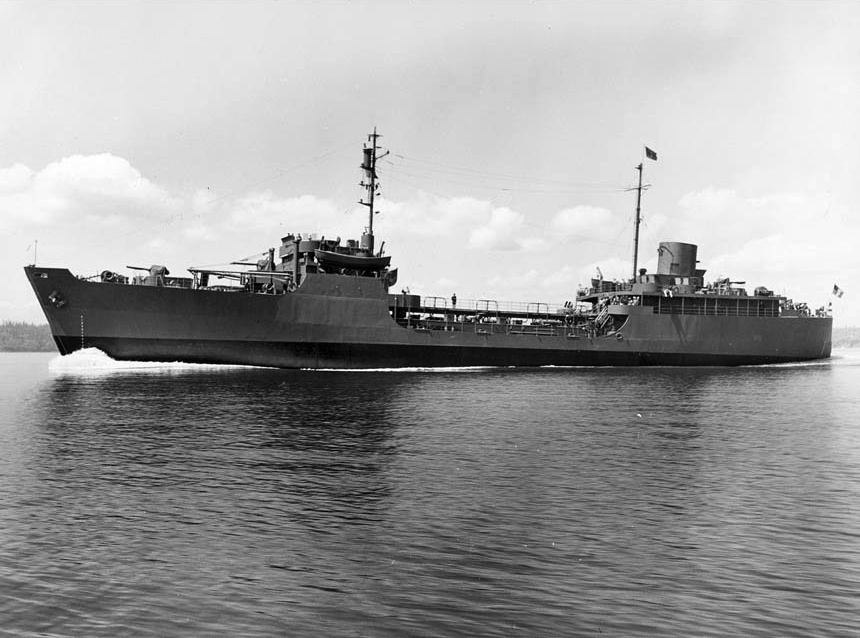

History

United States
- Name: USS Susquehanna
- Namesake: Susquehanna River in New York, Pennsylvania, and Maryland
- Builder: Seattle-Tacoma Shipbuilding Corporation
- Laid down: 9 September 1942
- Launched: 23 November 1942
- Commissioned: 7 June 1943
- Decommissioned: 15 August 1946 Transferred to the US Army Transportation Corps
- Stricken: 23 April 1947
- Reinstated: 1 July 1950
- In service: 1 July 1950, as T-AOG-5
- Out of service: 26 March 1959
- Stricken: 26 March 1959
- Fate: Scrapped, 1973

General characteristics
- Class & type: Patapsco-class gasoline tanker
- Displacement: 4,335 long tons (4,405 t) full load
- Length: 310 ft 9 in (94.72 m)
- Beam: 48 ft 6 in (14.78 m)
- Draft: 15 ft 8 in (4.78 m)
- Propulsion: 4 × General Electric diesel-electric engines, twin shafts, 3,300 hp (2,461 kW)
- Speed: 14 knots (16 mph; 26 km/h)
- Complement: 134 officers and men
- Armament: • 4 × 3"/50 caliber guns

USS Susquehanna (AOG-5) was a Patapsco-class gasoline tanker in service with United States Navy from 1943 to 1946 and with the Military Sea Transportation Service from 1950 to 1959. She was scrapped in 1973.

== History ==
USS Susquehanna was named for a river which rises in Lake Otsego in central New York and flows across Pennsylvania and the northeast corner of Maryland to empty into the Chesapeake Bay. Her keel was laid down on 9 September 1942 by the Seattle-Tacoma Shipbuilding Corporation of Seattle, Washington. She was launched on 23 November 1942; sponsored by Mrs. William Lindstrom and commissioned on 7 June 1943.

=== World War II ===
Susquehanna sailed for San Diego, California, on 25 June to begin her shakedown cruise which ended one month later. She moved up the coast to San Pedro, California, to load and, on 27 July, got underway for Australia. The tanker arrived at Townsville, Queensland, on 18 August and was attached to the Service Force, Seventh Fleet. On 4 September, she was underway for the Milne Bay area of New Guinea to service fleet units there. She returned to Australia to load cargo and aviation gas, from 23 November to 29 November, and delivered it to Milne Bay. Susquehanna operated between Australian and New Guinea ports until December 1944. She made two trips to the Netherlands East Indies and, in addition to supplying gas for large fleet units, serviced PT boats at Buna and other bases.

Susquehanna departed New Guinea on 20 December 1944 with a load of cargo and fuel for Leyte, and arrived there on 26 December. She departed the Dulag transport area on 2 January 1945 for Mindoro with gasoline for the United States Army air strips. The convoy that Susquehanna was attached to, composed mostly of minesweepers, was under enemy air attack on 2 January, 3 January, and 4 January. Of four planes that attacked the convoy on 3 January, one was splashed by gunfire from Susquehanna.

She sailed from the Philippines on 16 February, returned to the New Guinea operating area, and remained there until returning to Manila on 13 December 1945. She operated in the Philippine Islands until mid-August 1946. Susquehanna was transferred to the United States Army on 15 August 1946 and struck from the Naval Vessel Register on 23 April 1947.

=== Korean War ===
The tanker was reacquired and reinstated on the Naval Vessel Register on 1 July 1950. She was assigned to the Military Sea Transportation Service (MSTS) at that time with hull classification symbol T-AOG-5.

For the next nine years, Susquehanna shuttled between ports in Japan and Korea. The tanker finally departed Yokosuka for the United States on 17 February 1959 and arrived at San Francisco, California, on 6 March. Susquehanna moved to the Suisun Bay Reserve Fleet on 26 March 1959 and was struck from the Naval Vessel Register on that date. Susquehanna was sold on 10 August 1973 to the Levin Metals Corp, San Jose, California, for $43,655. Susquehanna was removed from Suisun Bay on 30 September 1973 and scrapped shortly after.
