= Savage, Minnesota =

City in Minnesota, United States

Savage Hamilton, Glendale
- City
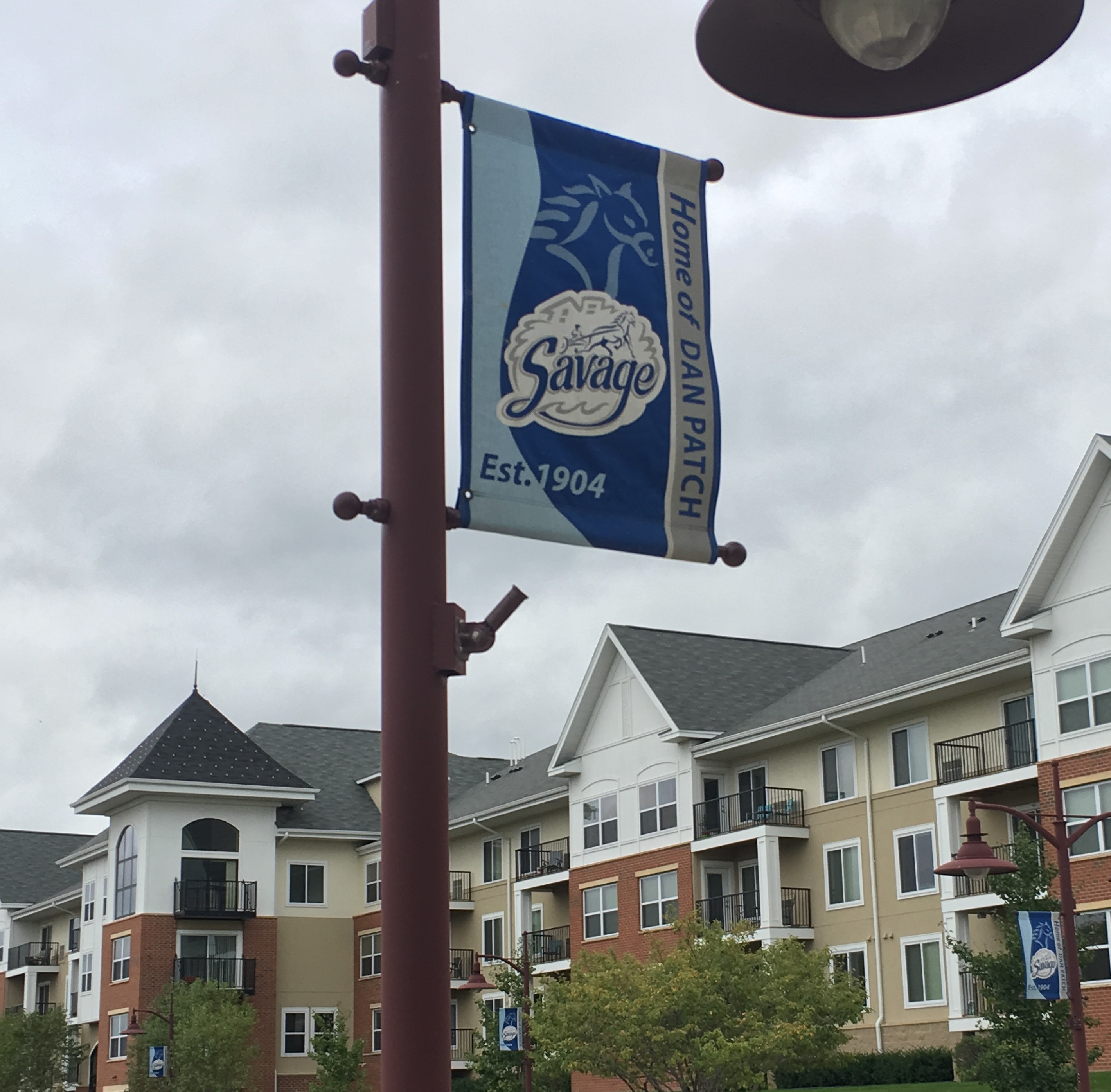
- A Dan Patch racehorse commemorative banner in Savage

- Seal

- Location of the city of Savage within Scott County, Minnesota
- Coordinates: 44°45′16″N 93°21′47″W
- Country: United States
- State: Minnesota
- County: Scott
- Founded: 1852
- Incorporated: 1892

Government
  - Mayor: Christine Kelly
  - Council: Bob Coughlen; Christine Kelly; Stacy Crakes; Matt Johnson

Area
  - City: 16.42 sq mi (42.53 km^{2})
  - Land: 15.60 sq mi (40.41 km^{2})
  - Water: 0.81 sq mi (2.11 km^{2}) 4.98%
- Elevation: 889 ft (271 m)

Population (2020)
  - City: 32,465
  - Estimate (2022): 32,893
  - Density: 2,080.7/sq mi (803.35/km^{2})
  - Metro: 3,690,512
- Time zone: UTC−6 (Central)
  - Summer (DST): UTC−5 (CDT)
- ZIP code: 55378
- Area code: 952
- FIPS code: 27-58738
- GNIS feature ID: 2396543
- Website: www.savagemn.gov

Savage (/ˈsævɪdʒ/ SAV-ij) is a suburban city 15 miles (24 km) south-southwest of downtown Minneapolis in Scott County in the U.S. state of Minnesota. The city is on the south bank of the Minnesota River in a region commonly called South of the River, comprising the southern portion of Minneapolis-St. Paul, the 16th-largest metropolitan area in the United States. The population of Savage was 32,465 at the 2020 census.

Minnesota State Highway 13 and County Road 42 are two of the main routes in Savage. Interstate 35W and U.S. Highway 169 are in close proximity to the city.

The landing point for Irish and Scottish immigrants in 1800, Savage has grown into a developing bedroom community, absorbing population growth from Burnsville, its larger neighbor to the east. Once a shipbuilding port for the U.S. Navy, Savage is now an industrial manufacturing job center in the southern metro. The city is still relatively undeveloped, with sections of the Minnesota Valley National Wildlife Refuge and Murphy-Hanrehan Park Reserve within its borders.

Previously named Hamilton after the city in Ontario, Canada, the town was renamed Savage after Marion Willis Savage, who owned and trained the nationally celebrated racing horse Dan Patch.

== History ==
In the 17th century, French fur traders and explorers explored the Minnesota River valley. After 1750, Mdewakanton Dakota then settled at Chief Black Dog's camp—near what is now Black Dog Lake in Burnsville. Dakota used the Minnesota River valley region including present-day Savage for fish, game, boating and camping.

In 1852, traders established a small post at the confluence of the Credit River and the Minnesota River. William Byrne, who immigrated from County Kilkenny, Ireland, to Hamilton, Ontario, Canada, in 1840, arrived in the area shortly after, via steamboat from Fort Snelling. Already established in business and trade, he and other Irish and Scottish settlers built Hamilton Landing, a port for boats, named after the city he immigrated to in Canada. The town incorporated in 1892 as the village of Hamilton. Byrne later settled another nearby area which became Burnsville.

The Chicago & North Western (present day Union Pacific Railroad) railway line reached the site in 1865, and in 1866 the town gained a post office. Hamilton became the crossroads of trade and service in the region with the Credit River, Minnesota River, the valley's wagon and road trails, and the rail line.

The post office was later renamed Glendale Post Station in 1894 and formed Glendale Township to the west of Hamilton, but was later consolidated with Savage in 1969. The roughly 17 blocks of the late 19th-century town remain as Savage's downtown along Highway 13.

In 1902, Minneapolis entrepreneur Marion Willis Savage purchased racing horse Dan Patch and trained and raced him at his farm in the limits of Hamilton. Dan Patch's notoriety grew as the horse began breaking speed records, and with it grew the town's prestige. In 1904 the townspeople renamed the community after Savage with the post office officially confirming. In 1906 at the Minnesota State Fair, Dan Patch broke the world pacing mile record at 1 minute and 55 seconds, a record that remained unsurpassed for 54 years.

During World War II, Savage was home to Camp Savage, a Military Intelligence School (MIS) language program, which taught Japanese to American military personnel. Established in 1942, the school trained with niseis and improved military intelligence of the time. It was later relocated to Fort Snelling and is commemorated at Normandale College's Japanese garden. At about the same time, Cargill, Incorporated, began building ships for the U.S. Navy at the newly constructed Meadowland Shipyard, renamed Port Cargill (former site of Hamilton Landing). To launch the ships, 14 miles (23 km) of the Minnesota River were dredged down to 9 feet (2.7 m) from Savage to the Mississippi River confluence. About 3,500 people were employed during peak production resulting in 18 auxiliary oil and gas carriers and 4 tugboats constructed. After World War II the port began shipping agricultural commodities.

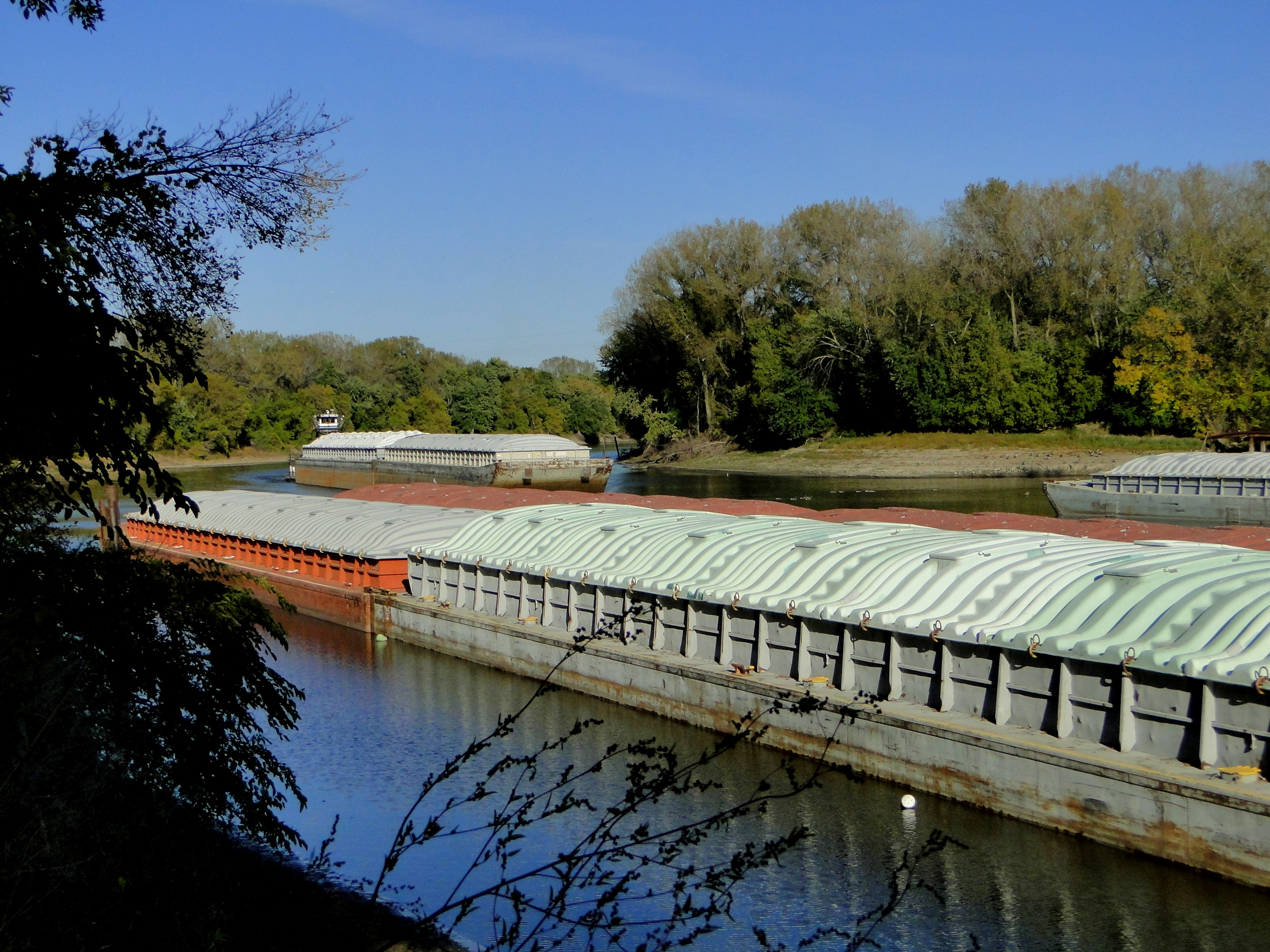
The towboat J.L. Fleming brings empty grain barges into Port Cargill on the Minnesota River, a tributary of the Mississippi River.

Savage remained undeveloped in the postwar housing boom, isolated by the Minnesota River and without a direct interstate connection. Lack of available construction materials in the immediate area also prevented development. By the 1980s, with the upgrade of Highway 13 and construction of the Highway 169 Bloomington Ferry Bridge in 1996 across the Minnesota River, Savage finally boomed as one of the growing exurbs with low-cost greenfield land in the metropolitan area. The citizens of Savage reclaimed some of their history in the early 21st century, when it relocated the displaced Savage Depot built in 1880 by the then Chicago, Minneapolis and Omaha Rail Road.

== Geography ==
According to the United States Census Bureau, the city has an area of 16.45 square miles (42.61 km^{2}); 15.63 square miles (40.48 km^{2}) is land and 0.82 square miles (2.12 km^{2}) is water. The city's northern boundary is the Minnesota River; its tributary the Credit River flows northward through the city.

== Demographics ==
Historical population
Census	Pop.	Note	%±
1900	179		—
1910	271		51.4%
1920	206		−24.0%
1930	214		3.9%
1940	222		3.7%
1950	389		75.2%
1960	1,094		181.2%
1970	3,611		230.1%
1980	3,954		9.5%
1990	9,606		142.9%
2000	21,115		119.8%
2010	26,911		27.4%
2020	32,465		20.6%
2022 (est.)	32,893		1.3%
U.S. Decennial Census; 2020 Census

=== 2020 census ===
As of the 2020 census, Savage had a population of 32,465. The median age was 36.7 years. 27.2% of residents were under the age of 18 and 10.4% of residents were 65 years of age or older. For every 100 females there were 98.3 males, and for every 100 females age 18 and over there were 97.2 males age 18 and over.

99.7% of residents lived in urban areas, while 0.3% lived in rural areas.

There were 11,181 households in Savage, of which 39.9% had children under the age of 18 living in them. Of all households, 63.7% were married-couple households, 12.0% were households with a male householder and no spouse or partner present, and 17.9% were households with a female householder and no spouse or partner present. About 16.5% of all households were made up of individuals and 6.0% had someone living alone who was 65 years of age or older.

There were 11,460 housing units, of which 2.4% were vacant. The homeowner vacancy rate was 0.9% and the rental vacancy rate was 3.6%.

Racial composition as of the 2020 census
Race	Number	Percent
White	23,868	73.5%
Black or African American	2,837	8.7%
American Indian and Alaska Native	164	0.5%
Asian	2,922	9.0%
Native Hawaiian and Other Pacific Islander	25	0.1%
Some other race	702	2.2%
Two or more races	1,947	6.0%
Hispanic or Latino (of any race)	1,526	4.7%

=== 2010 census ===
As of the census of 2010, there were 26,911 people, 9,116 households, and 7,222 families living in the city. The population density was 1,721.8 inhabitants per square mile (664.8/km^{2}). There were 9,429 housing units at an average density of 603.3 per square mile (232.9/km^{2}). The racial makeup of the city was 82.6% White, 4.3% African American, 0.4% Native American, 8.4% Asian, 0.3% Pacific Islander, 1.4% from other races, and 2.6% from two or more races. Hispanic or Latino of any race were 3.4% of the population.

There were 9,116 households, of which 47.6% had children under the age of 18 living with them, 66.3% were married couples living together, 8.2% had a female householder with no husband present, 4.7% had a male householder with no wife present, and 20.8% were non-families. 14.8% of all households were made up of individuals, and 3.2% had someone living alone who was 65 years of age or older. The average household size was 2.95 and the average family size was 3.31.

The median age in the city was 34.6 years. 31.5% of residents were under the age of 18; 6.1% were between the ages of 18 and 24; 30.8% were from 25 to 44; 26.1% were from 45 to 64; and 5.5% were 65 years of age or older. The gender makeup of the city was 50.1% male and 49.9% female.

=== 2000 census ===
As of the census of 2000, there were 21,115 people, 6,807 households, and 5,717 families living in the city. The population density was 1,326.9 inhabitants per square mile (512.3/km^{2}). There were 6,994 housing units at an average density of 439.5 per square mile (169.7/km^{2}). The racial makeup of the city was 90.65% White, 1.59% African American, 0.25% Native American, 5.39% Asian, 0.02% Pacific Islander, 0.66% from other races, and 1.45% from two or more races. Hispanic or Latino of any race were 1.63% of the population.

There were 6,807 households, out of which 56.4% had children under the age of 18 living with them, 74.0% were married couples living together, 6.6% had a female householder with no husband present, and 16.0% were non-families. 11.1% of all households were made up of individuals, and 1.7% had someone living alone who was 65 years of age or older. The average household size was 3.10 and the average family size was 3.38.

In the city, the population was spread out, with 35.6% under the age of 18, 4.5% from 18 to 24, 43.5% from 25 to 44, 13.7% from 45 to 64, and 2.6% who were 65 years of age or older. The median age was 31 years. For every 100 females, there were 103.6 males. For every 100 females age 18 and over, there were 101.2 males.

The median income for a household in the city was $75,097, and the median income for a family was $79,244 (these figures had risen to $92,571 and $99,814 respectively as of a 2007 estimate). Males had a median income of $50,884 versus $35,824 for females. The per capita income for the city was $26,858. About 1.9% of families and 2.3% of the population were below the poverty line, including 2.4% of those under age 18 and 3.0% of those age 65 or over.

== Schools ==
Three school districts serve the city of Savage:

- Prior Lake-Savage District 719
- Burnsville-Eagan-Savage District 191
- Shakopee School District 720

A portion of Savage is in the Bloomington School District, but no households are in this area.

Students of the schools in the Prior Lake-Savage District that are in Savage (Redtail Ridge Elementary School, Hamilton Ridge Elementary School, and Glendale Elementary School) go on to Prior Lake High School.

Students of the schools in the Burnsville-Eagan-Savage School District that are in Savage (Harriet Bishop Elementary School, Hidden Valley Elementary School, and Eagle Ridge Middle School) go on to Burnsville High School.

== Government and politics ==
United States presidential election results for Savage, Minnesota
Year	Republican		Democratic		Third party(ies)	
Year	No.	%	No.	%	No.	%
2000	5,533	53.54%	4,257	41.19%	544	5.26%
2004	7,675	58.12%	5,417	41.02%	114	0.86%
2008	7,454	51.74%	6,730	46.71%	224	1.55%
2012	8,116	52.90%	6,898	44.96%	328	2.14%
2016	7,404	45.35%	7,394	45.29%	1,528	9.36%
2020	8,573	44.23%	10,318	53.23%	492	2.54%
2024	8,463	44.27%	10,134	53.01%	521	2.73%

The current mayor is Christine Kelly, and the city's four city council members are Stacy Crakes, Matthew Johnson, Bob Coughlen, and Megan Bergstrom.

Savage is in Minnesota's 2nd congressional district, represented by Angie Craig, a Democrat. The city is in Minnesota Legislative District 55A, represented in the Minnesota House of Representatives by Jessica Hanson and in the Minnesota Senate by Lindsey Port.
