= USS Nodaway (AOG-67) =

History

United States
- Name: Nodaway
- Namesake: Nodaway River
- Ordered: as type (T1-M-BT1) hull, MC hull 2627
- Awarded: 26 July 1944
- Builder: St. Johns River Shipbuilding Company, Jacksonville, Florida
- Cost: $1,022,203.48
- Yard number: 86
- Way number: 2
- Laid down: 22 January 1945
- Launched: 14 April 1945
- Completed: 18 September 1945
- Acquired: Acquisition canceled, 27 August 1945
- Renamed: West Ranch
- Stricken: 21 January 1946
- Identification: Hull symbol: AOG-67; Call sign: NDCT
- Fate: Sold for commercial use, 1946

United States
- Name: Dynafuel
- Owner: Sun Oil
- Fate: Scrapped 14 November 1963

General characteristics
- Class & type: Klickitat-class gasoline tanker
- Type: Type T1-MT-BT1 tanker
- Displacement: 1,980 long tons (2,012 t) (light); 5,970 long tons (6,066 t) (full load)
- Length: 325 ft 2 in (99.11 m)
- Beam: 48 ft 2 in (14.68 m)
- Draft: 19 ft (5.8 m)
- Installed power: 1 × Enterprise DNQ-38 Diesel engine; 800 shp (600 kW)
- Propulsion: 1 × Westinghouse main reduction gears; 1 × shaft
- Speed: 10 kn (19 km/h; 12 mph)
- Capacity: 10,465 bbl (1,663.8 m^{3}) (Diesel); 871,332 US gal (3,298,350 L; 725,536 imp gal) (Gasoline)
- Complement: 80
- Armament: 1 × 3 in (76 mm)/50 caliber dual-purpose (DP) gun; 2 × 40 mm (1.57 in) Bofors anti-aircraft (AA) gun mounts; 3 × 20 mm (0.79 in) Oerlikon cannon AA gun mounts

USS Nodaway (AOG-67), was a type T1 Klickitat-class gasoline tanker built for the US Navy during World War II. She was named after the Nodaway River, in Iowa. Nodaway (AOG-67) was never commissioned into the US Navy.

== Construction ==
Nodaway was laid down on 22 January 1945, under a Maritime Commission (MARCOM) contract, MC hull 2627, by the St. Johns River Shipbuilding Company, Jacksonville, Florida; acquisition by the US Navy was cancelled on 27 August 1945.

== Service history ==
Completed by Merrill-Stevens Drydock & Repair Co., 18 September 1945, she was renamed West Ranch. She was sold to Sun Oil, in 1946, and renamed Dynafuel. On 14 November 1963, she collided near Buzzards Bay, Massachusetts, with the Norwegian freighter SS Fernview. She was scrapped later in 1963, due to the damage from the collision and fire.

== Bibliography ==
- "Nodaway". Dictionary of American Naval Fighting Ships. Naval History and Heritage Command. 13 August 2015. This article incorporates text from this source, which is in the public domain.
- "USS Nodaway (AOG-67)". NavSource. 19 December 2014.
- "St. John's River Shipbuilding, Jacksonville FL". www.ShipbuildingHistory.com. 16 October 2010.
- "USS Nodaway".
