= USS Klickitat =

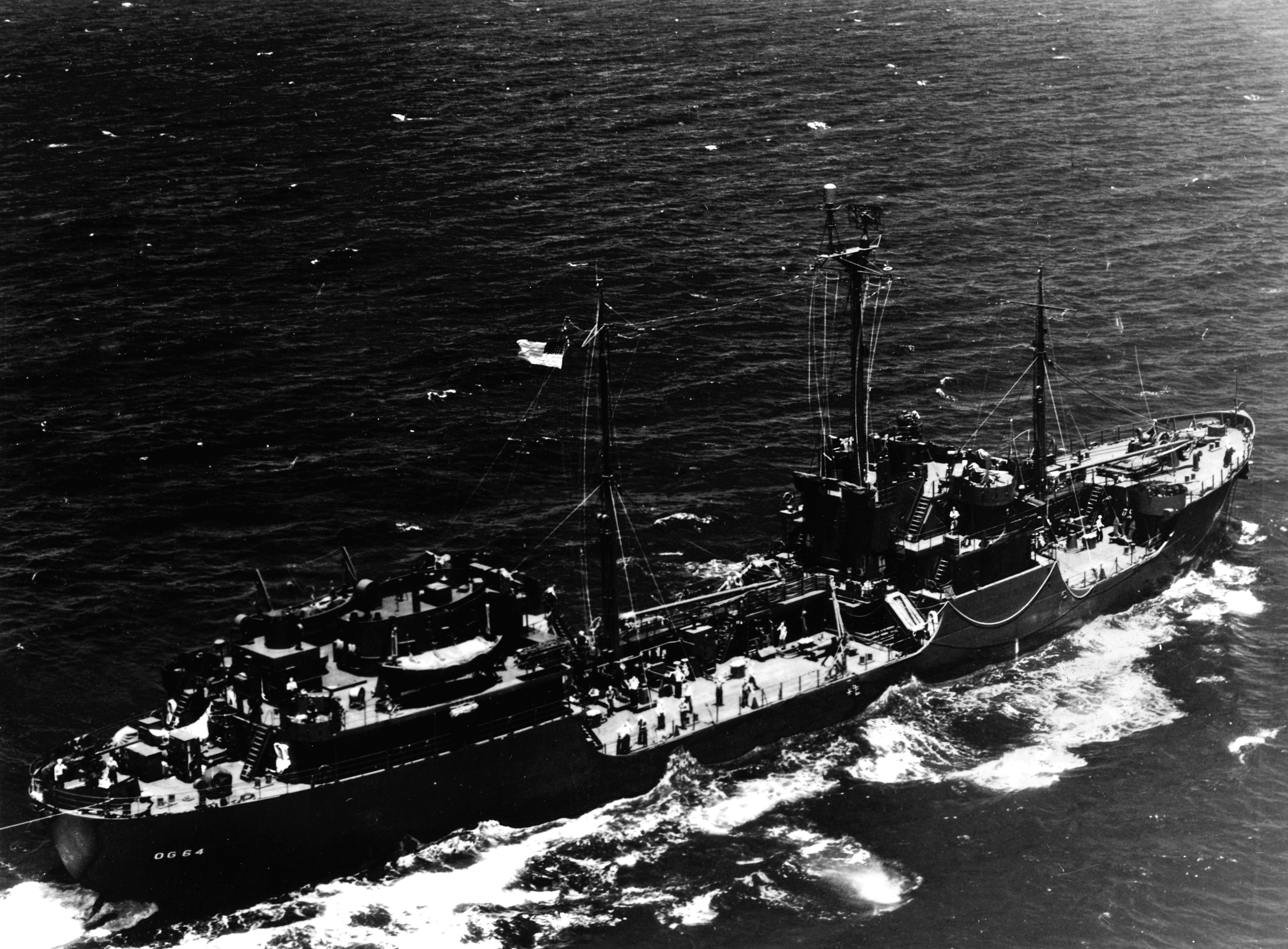
- USS Klickitat (AOG-64) on 29 May 1946

History

United States
- Name: Klickitat
- Namesake: Klickitat River
- Ordered: as type (T1-M-BT1) hull, MC hull 2624
- Awarded: 26 July 1944
- Builder: St. Johns River Shipbuilding Company, Jacksonville, Florida
- Cost: $1,022,203.48
- Yard number: 83
- Way number: 3
- Laid down: 16 December 1944
- Launched: 24 March 1945
- Sponsored by: Mrs. I. B. McDaniel
- Commissioned: 14 July 1945
- Decommissioned: 23 January 1946
- Stricken: 7 February 1946
- Identification: Hull symbol: AOG-64; Call sign: NDCM
- Fate: Transferred to the Maritime Commission (MARCOM), 23 January 1946; Laid up in the James River Reserve Fleet, Lee Hall, Virginia, 24 January 1946; Sold for commercial use, 20 August 1948

United States
- Name: Captain
- Owner: Manuel Rodriguez Trading Corp.
- Fate: Wrecked and rebuilt, 1948; Sold to Argentina, 14 June 1949
- Notes: Sold to Argentina without cost

Argentina
- Name: Punta Loyola
- Namesake: Punta Loyola
- Acquired: 14 June 1949
- Stricken: 1984
- Fate: Sold, 1968; Renamed Alkene, wrecked, 1974

General characteristics
- Class & type: Klickitat-class gasoline tanker
- Type: Type T1-MT-BT1 tanker
- Displacement: 1,980 long tons (2,012 t) (light); 5,970 long tons (6,066 t) (full load)
- Length: 325 ft 2 in (99.11 m)
- Beam: 48 ft 2 in (14.68 m)
- Draft: 19 ft (5.8 m)
- Installed power: 1 × Enterprise DNQ-38 Diesel engine; 800 shp (600 kW)
- Propulsion: 1 × Westinghouse main reduction gears; 1 × shaft
- Speed: 10 kn (19 km/h; 12 mph)
- Capacity: 10,465 bbl (1,663.8 m^{3}) (Diesel); 871,332 US gal (3,298,350 L; 725,536 imp gal) (Gasoline)
- Complement: 80
- Armament: 1 × 3 in (76 mm)/50 caliber dual-purpose (DP) gun; 2 × 40 mm (1.57 in) Bofors anti-aircraft (AA) gun mounts; 3 × 20 mm (0.79 in) Oerlikon cannon AA gun mounts

USS Klickitat (AOG-64), was the lead ship of the type T1 Klickitat-class gasoline tanker built for the US Navy during World War II. She was named after the Klickitat River, in Washington.

== Construction ==
Klickitat was laid down on 16 December 1944, under a Maritime Commission (MARCOM) contract, MC hull 2624, by the St. Johns River Shipbuilding Company, Jacksonville, Florida; sponsored by Mrs. I. B. McDaniel; acquired by the US Navy and commissioned 14 July 1945.

== Service history ==
Departing Jacksonville, 28 July, Klickitat arrived Hampton Roads, Virginia, 31 July. After shakedown in the Chesapeake Bay, the gasoline tanker proceeded on 23 August, for Rockland, Maine, arriving 26 August. She returned to Norfolk, 3 September, and departed 23 November, with her sister ship Michigamme, for Houston, Texas. Arriving 2 December, she loaded a cargo of diesel oil, sailed 3 December, for the East Coast, and arrived Norfolk, 12 December. Remaining at Norfolk, Klickitat decommissioned 23 January 1946, and was returned to the Maritime Commission (MARCOM) 24 January. Her name was struck from the Navy List 7 February 1946.

Klickitat was laid up in the James River Reserve Fleet, Lee Hall, Virginia, on 24 January 1946. On 20 August 1948, she was sold for commercial use to Manuel Rodriguez Trading Corp., and renamed Captain. Wrecked in 1948, she was rebuilt and sold to the Argentine Navy at no cost and renamed Punta Loyola.

== Bibliography ==
- "Klickitat". Dictionary of American Naval Fighting Ships. Naval History and Heritage Command. 28 July 2015. This article incorporates text from this source, which is in the public domain.
- "USS Klickitat (AOG-64)". NavSource. 19 April 2019.
- "St. John's River Shipbuilding, Jacksonville FL". www.ShipbuildingHistory.com. 16 October 2010.
- Maritime Administration. "Klickitat". Ship History Database Vessel Status Card. U.S. Department of Transportation, Maritime Administration.
- "USS Klickitat".
