= MV Louden =

History
- Name: Louden; Piscataqua
- Namesake: Piscataqua River
- Ordered: as type (T1-M-BT1) hull, MC hull 2630
- Awarded: 26 July 1944
- Builder: St. Johns River Shipbuilding Company, Jacksonville, Florida
- Cost: $1,022,203.48
- Yard number: 89
- Way number: 3
- Laid down: 24 March 1945
- Launched: 26 May 1945
- Completed: 16 July 1947
- Acquired: Acquisition canceled, 26 August 1945
- Renamed: Piscataqua
- Identification: Hull symbol: AOG-70
- Fate: Sold for commercial use, 16 July 1947

United States
- Name: Louden
- Owner: International Tankers
- Fate: Sold, 1948

United States
- Name: Transwel
- Fate: Sold 1950

Mexico
- Name: Salamanca
- Owner: Petroleos Mexicanos SA
- Fate: Scrapped, 1972

General characteristics
- Class & type: Klickitat-class gasoline tanker
- Type: Type T1-MT-BT1 tanker
- Displacement: 1,980 long tons (2,012 t) (light); 5,970 long tons (6,066 t) (full load)
- Length: 325 ft 2 in (99.11 m)
- Beam: 48 ft 2 in (14.68 m)
- Draft: 19 ft (5.8 m)
- Installed power: 1 × Enterprise DNQ-38 Diesel engine; 800 shp (600 kW)
- Propulsion: 1 × Westinghouse main reduction gears; 1 × shaft
- Speed: 10 kn (19 km/h; 12 mph)
- Capacity: 10,465 bbl (1,663.8 m^{3}) (Diesel); 871,332 US gal (3,298,350 L; 725,536 imp gal) (Gasoline)
- Complement: 80
- Armament: 1 × 3 in (76 mm)/50 caliber dual-purpose (DP) gun; 2 × 40 mm (1.57 in) Bofors anti-aircraft (AA) gun mounts; 3 × 20 mm (0.79 in) Oerlikon cannon AA gun mounts

MV Louden was acquired by the Maritime Commission (MARCOM) on a loan charter basis and renamed USS Piscataqua (AOG-70), she was to be a type T1 Klickitat-class gasoline tanker built for the US Navy during World War II. She was named after the Piscataqua River, between New Hampshire and Maine. Piscataqua (AOG-70) was never commissioned into the US Navy.

== Construction ==
Louden (AOG-70) was laid down on 24 March 1945, under a Maritime Commission (MARCOM) contract, MC hull 2630, by the St. Johns River Shipbuilding Company, Jacksonville, Florida; she was renamed Piscataqua, but acquisition by the US Navy was cancelled 26 August 1945.

Piscataqua was launched on 26 May 1945, and was about 80.3% complete when, due to the end of World War II, the ship's US Navy reassignment was canceled. She reverted to her original name of Louden. The unfinished ship was completed by the Maryland Drydock Company, Baltimore, Maryland, in 1947, and sold to the International Tankers, 16 July 1947.

== Career ==
Louden was resold in 1948, and renamed Transwel. Transwel was resold in 1950, and renamed Salamanca. Salamanca was scrapped in 1972.

== Bibliography ==
- "Piscataqua (AOG-70)". NavSource. 21 November 2008.
- Maritime Administration. "Piscataqua". Ship History Database Vessel Status Card. U.S. Department of Transportation, Maritime Administration.
- "St. John's River Shipbuilding, Jacksonville FL". www.ShipbuildingHistory.com. 16 October 2010.
- "Piscataqua".
