= SS Jasper F. Cropsey =

Liberty ship of WWII

- Jasper F. Cropsey, probably in Belgium

History

United States
- Name: Jasper F. Cropsey
- Namesake: Jasper F. Cropsey
- Owner: War Shipping Administration (WSA)
- Operator: United States Navigation Co., Inc.
- Port of registry: Jacksonville
- Ordered: as type (EC2-S-C1) hull, MC hull 2484
- Awarded: 23 April 1943
- Builder: St. Johns River Shipbuilding Company, Jacksonville, Florida
- Cost: $1,116,898
- Yard number: 48
- Way number: 6
- Laid down: 19 May 1944
- Launched: 30 June 1944
- Sponsored by: Mrs. William Thinschneider
- Completed: 20 July 1944
- Identification: US official number 246006; call sign: WRQZ
- Fate: Sold for commercial use, 7 April 1947

United States
- Name: Jaspar F. Cropsey
- Owner: United States Navigation Co
- Fate: Sold, November 1948

United States
- Name: Jasper F. Cropsey (1948–1949); Oceanic (1949–)
- Owner: Panoceanic Steamship Corp.
- Operator: Orion Shipping & Trading Co.
- Fate: Sold, April 1955

(1955–1957); * (1957)
- Name: Oceanic
- Owner: Tramp Freighter Corp.
- Operator: Polarus Steamship Co.
- Fate: Sold, 21 March 1957

United States
- Name: Oceanic
- Owner: Seatramp, Inc.
- Operator: Cargo Ships & Tankers Ltd
- Fate: Sold, 1 November 1961

United States
- Name: Oceanic
- Owner: Cargo Ships & Tankers Ltd
- Fate: Sold, 29 November 1966

United States
- Name: Oceanic
- Owner: Hudson Waterways Corp.
- Operator: Transeastern Assoc., Inc.
- Fate: Sold, 25 August 1967

United States
- Name: Oceanic
- Owner: US Department of Commerce
- Fate: Sold for scrapping, 29 September 1967

General characteristics
- Class & type: Liberty ship; type EC2-S-C1, standard
- Tonnage: 10,865 LT DWT; 7,176 GRT
- Displacement: 3,380 long tons (3,434 t) (light); 14,245 long tons (14,474 t) (max)
- Length: 441 feet 6 inches (135 m) oa; 416 feet (127 m) pp; 427 feet (130 m) lwl
- Beam: 57 feet (17 m)
- Draft: 27 ft 9.25 in (8.4646 m)
- Installed power: 2 × Oil fired 450 °F (232 °C) boilers, operating at 220 psi (1,500 kPa); 2,500 hp (1,900 kW)
- Propulsion: 1 × triple-expansion steam engine, (manufactured by Joshua Hendy Iron Works, Sunnyvale, California); 1 × screw propeller
- Speed: 11.5 knots (21.3 km/h; 13.2 mph)
- Capacity: 562,608 cubic feet (15,931 m^{3}) (grain); 499,573 cubic feet (14,146 m^{3}) (bale)
- Complement: 38–62 USMM; 21–40 USNAG
- Armament: Varied by ship; Bow-mounted 3-inch (76 mm)/50-caliber gun; Stern-mounted 4-inch (102 mm)/50-caliber gun; 2–8 × single 20-millimeter (0.79 in) Oerlikon anti-aircraft (AA) cannons and/or, 2–8 × 37-millimeter (1.46 in) M1 AA guns

SS Jasper F. Cropsey was a Liberty ship built in the United States during World War II. She was named after Jasper F. Cropsey, an American landscape artist of the Hudson River School.

== Construction ==
Jasper F. Cropsey was laid down on 19 May 1944, under a Maritime Commission (MARCOM) contract, MC hull 2484, by the St. Johns River Shipbuilding Company, Jacksonville, Florida; sponsored by Mrs. William Thinschneider, the granddaughter of the namesake, and was launched on 30 June 1944.

== History ==
She was allocated to the United States Navigation Co., Inc., on 20 July 1944. She was sold for commercial use, 7 April 1947, to United States Navigation Co., Inc. After a name and several owner changes she was scrapped in Italy, in 1967.

== Bibliography ==
- "St. John's River Shipbuilding, Jacksonville FL". ShipbuildingHistory.com. 16 October 2010.
- Maritime Administration. "Jasper F. Cropsey". Ship History Database Vessel Status Card. U.S. Department of Transportation, Maritime Administration.
- Davies, James (May 2004). "Specifications (As-Built)" (PDF). p. 23.
- "SS Jasper F. Cropsey".
