= SS James K. Paulding =

Liberty ship of WWII

History

United States
- Name: James K. Paulding
- Namesake: James K. Paulding
- Owner: War Shipping Administration (WSA)
- Operator: United States Navigation Company
- Ordered: as type (EC2-S-C1) hull, MC hull 2477
- Awarded: 23 April 1943
- Builder: St. Johns River Shipbuilding Company, Jacksonville, Florida
- Cost: $1,036,829
- Yard number: 41
- Way number: 5
- Laid down: 30 March 1944
- Launched: 12 May 1944
- Sponsored by: Mrs. M.V. McFarland
- Completed: 30 May 1944
- Identification: Call sign: WOON
- Fate: Laid up in the, National Defense Reserve Fleet, Mobile, Alabama, 14 November 1947; Sold for scrapping, 22 September 1964, removed from fleet, 30 October 1964

General characteristics
- Class & type: Liberty ship; type EC2-S-C1, standard
- Tonnage: 10,865 LT DWT; 7,176 GRT
- Displacement: 3,380 long tons (3,434 t) (light); 14,245 long tons (14,474 t) (max)
- Length: 441 feet 6 inches (135 m) oa; 416 feet (127 m) pp; 427 feet (130 m) lwl
- Beam: 57 feet (17 m)
- Draft: 27 ft 9.25 in (8.4646 m)
- Installed power: 2 × Oil fired 450 °F (232 °C) boilers, operating at 220 psi (1,500 kPa); 2,500 hp (1,900 kW)
- Propulsion: 1 × triple-expansion steam engine, (manufactured by General Machinery Corp., Hamilton, Ohio); 1 × screw propeller
- Speed: 11.5 knots (21.3 km/h; 13.2 mph)
- Capacity: 562,608 cubic feet (15,931 m^{3}) (grain); 499,573 cubic feet (14,146 m^{3}) (bale)
- Complement: 38–62 USMM; 21–40 USNAG
- Armament: Varied by ship; Bow-mounted 3-inch (76 mm)/50-caliber gun; Stern-mounted 4-inch (102 mm)/50-caliber gun; 2–8 × single 20-millimeter (0.79 in) Oerlikon anti-aircraft (AA) cannons and/or, 2–8 × 37-millimeter (1.46 in) M1 AA guns

SS James K. Paulding was a Liberty ship built in the United States during World War II. She was named after James K. Paulding, an American writer and the 11th United States Secretary of the Navy.

== Construction ==
James K. Paulding was laid down on 30 March 1944, under a Maritime Commission (MARCOM) contract, MC hull 2477, by the St. Johns River Shipbuilding Company, Jacksonville, Florida; she was sponsored by Mrs. M.V. McFarland, the wife of the War Shipping Administration (WSA) manager in, Jacksonville, and was launched on 12 May 1944.

== History ==
She was allocated to the United States Navigation Company, on 30 May 1944. On 14 November 1947, she was laid up in the National Defense Reserve Fleet, Mobile, Alabama,. She was sold for scrapping, 22 September 1964, to Southern Scrap Material Co., Ltd., for $51,666.88. She was removed from the fleet on 30 October 1964.

== Bibliography ==
- "St. John's River Shipbuilding, Jacksonville FL". www.ShipbuildingHistory.com. 16 October 2010.
- Maritime Administration. "James K. Paulding". Ship History Database Vessel Status Card. U.S. Department of Transportation, Maritime Administration.
- Davies, James (May 2004). "Specifications (As-Built)" (PDF). p. 23.
- "SS James K. Paulding".
