= USS Michigamme =

History

United States
- Name: Michigamme
- Namesake: Michigamme River
- Ordered: as type (T1-M-BT1) hull, MC hull 2625
- Awarded: 26 July 1944
- Builder: St. Johns River Shipbuilding Company, Jacksonville, Florida
- Cost: $1,022,203.48
- Yard number: 84
- Way number: 5
- Laid down: 30 December 1944
- Launched: 31 March 1945
- Sponsored by: Miss Elaine Jeanne Crouch
- Commissioned: 10 August 1945
- Decommissioned: 23 January 1946
- Stricken: 7 February 1946
- Identification: Hull symbol: AOG-65; Call sign: NDCP
- Fate: Sold for commercial use, 3 January 1948

United States
- Name: Black Bayou
- Owner: Manuel Rodriguez Trading Corp.
- Fate: Sold to Argentina, 22 March 1948

Argentina
- Name: Punta Ninfas
- Namesake: Punta Ninfas
- Acquired: 22 March 1948
- Stricken: 1958
- Identification: Hull symbol: B-15
- Fate: Sold, 1958, renamed Moises, scrapped, 1964

General characteristics
- Class & type: Klickitat-class gasoline tanker
- Type: Type T1-MT-BT1 tanker
- Displacement: 1,980 long tons (2,012 t) (light); 5,970 long tons (6,066 t) (full load)
- Length: 325 ft 2 in (99.11 m)
- Beam: 48 ft 2 in (14.68 m)
- Draft: 19 ft (5.8 m)
- Installed power: 1 × Enterprise DNQ-38 Diesel engine; 800 shp (600 kW)
- Propulsion: 1 × Westinghouse main reduction gears; 1 × shaft
- Speed: 10 kn (19 km/h; 12 mph)
- Capacity: 10,465 bbl (1,663.8 m^{3}) (Diesel); 871,332 US gal (3,298,350 L; 725,536 imp gal) (Gasoline)
- Complement: 80
- Armament: 1 × 3 in (76 mm)/50 caliber dual-purpose (DP) gun; 2 × 40 mm (1.57 in) Bofors anti-aircraft (AA) gun mounts; 3 × 20 mm (0.79 in) Oerlikon cannon AA gun mounts

USS Michigamme (AOG-64), was a type T1 Klickitat-class gasoline tanker built for the US Navy during World War II. She was named after the Michigamme River, in Michigan.

== Construction ==
Michigamme was laid down on 30 December 1944, under a Maritime Commission (MARCOM) contract, MC hull 2625, by the St. Johns River Shipbuilding Company, Jacksonville, Florida; sponsored by Miss Elaine Jeanne Crouch; acquired by the US Navy and commissioned 10 August 1945.

== Service history ==
Assigned to the Atlantic Fleet, Michigame with a Coast Guard crew reported to Commander, Service Force, 20 September 1945, for oiler duties off Norfolk, Virginia, until she decommissioned 23 January 1946. The next day she was delivered to the War Shipping Administration (WSA) to serve the Maritime Commission as Black Bayou. Before she could see service as Black Bayou she was sold to the Argentine Navy 22 March 1948, and commissioned in the Argentine Navy as Punta Ninfas (B‑15). She was sold for commercial service in 1958, and renamed Moises. She was sold for scrapping in 1964.

== Bibliography ==
- "Michigamme". Dictionary of American Naval Fighting Ships. Naval History and Heritage Command. This article incorporates text from this source, which is in the public domain.
- "USS Michigamme (AOG-65)". NavSource. 2 June 2017.
- "St. John's River Shipbuilding, Jacksonville FL". www.ShipbuildingHistory.com. 16 October 2010.
- Maritime Administration. "Michigamme". Ship History Database Vessel Status Card. U.S. Department of Transportation, Maritime Administration.
- "USS Michigamme".
