= USS Peconic =

1944 American gasoline tanker

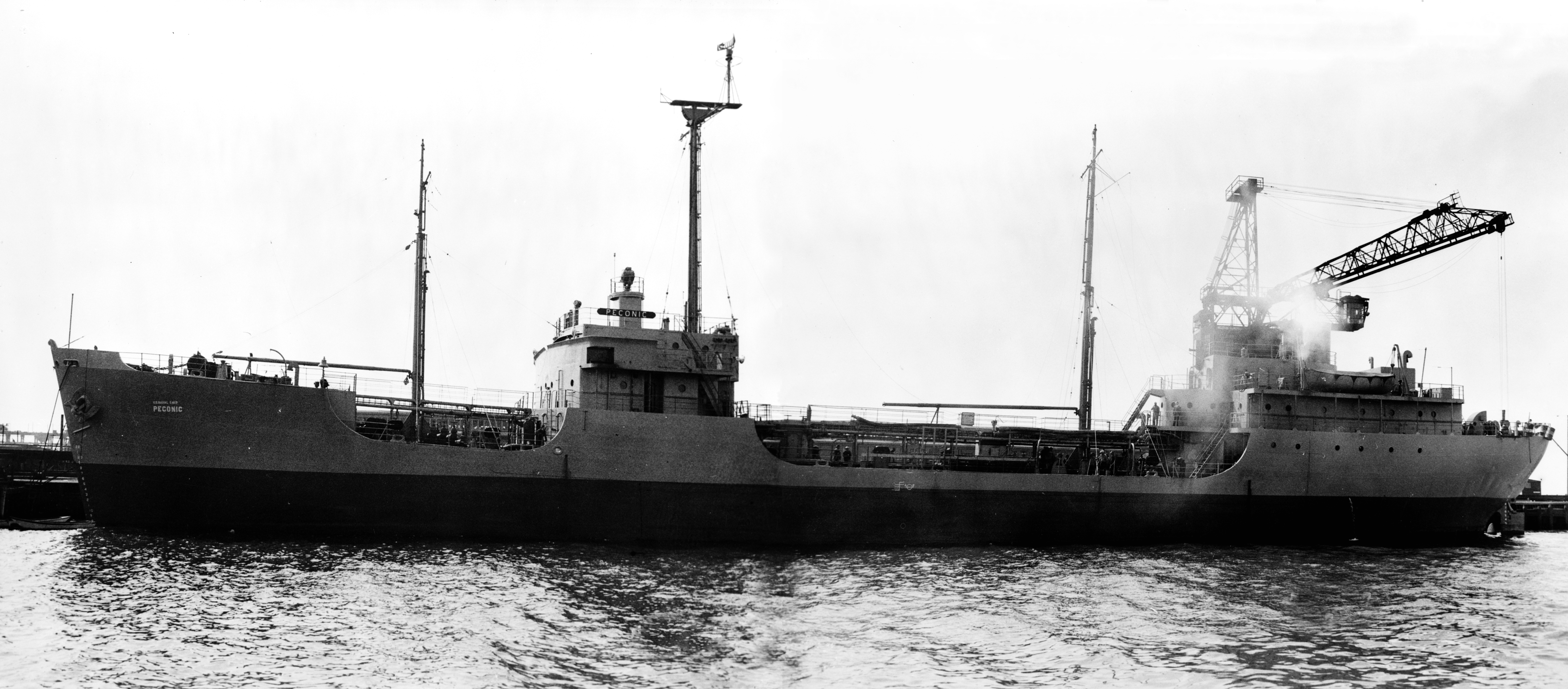

History

United States
- Name: Peconic
- Namesake: Peconic River in New York
- Ordered: as type (T1-M-BT1) hull, MC hull 2628
- Awarded: 26 July 1944
- Builder: St. Johns River Shipbuilding Company, Jacksonville, Florida
- Cost: $1,022,203.48
- Yard number: 87
- Way number: 4
- Laid down: 31 January 1945
- Launched: 14 May 1945
- Sponsored by: Mrs. Mal Haughton, Jr.
- Commissioned: 19 September 1945
- Decommissioned: 4 January 1946
- Stricken: 21 January 1946
- Identification: Hull symbol: AOG-68; Call sign: NDCV
- Fate: Transferred to the Maritime Commission (MARCOM), 21 January 1946; Leased for commercial use

United States
- Name: Voshell
- Owner: Maritime Transport Lines Inc.
- Identification: IMO number: 6912085
- Fate: Returned to Naval Transportation Service (NTS), 4 April 1948; Turned over to Military Sea Transportation Service (MSTS), 1 October 1949

United States
- Name: Peconic
- Owner: MSTS
- Identification: IMO number: 6912085
- Fate: Laid up in National Defense Reserve Fleet, Beaumont, Texas, 12 November 1957; Sold for scrapping, 27 July 1982, removed from the fleet, 7 December 1982

General characteristics
- Class & type: Klickitat-class gasoline tanker
- Type: Type T1-MT-BT1 tanker
- Displacement: 1,980 long tons (2,012 t) (light); 5,970 long tons (6,066 t) (full load)
- Length: 325 ft 2 in (99.11 m)
- Beam: 48 ft 2 in (14.68 m)
- Draft: 19 ft (5.8 m)
- Installed power: 1 × Enterprise DNQ-38 Diesel engine; 800 shp (600 kW)
- Propulsion: 1 × Westinghouse main reduction gears; 1 × shaft
- Speed: 10 kn (19 km/h; 12 mph)
- Capacity: 10,465 bbl (1,663.8 m^{3}) (Diesel); 871,332 US gal (3,298,350 L; 725,536 imp gal) (Gasoline)
- Complement: 80
- Armament: 1 × 3 in (76 mm)/50 caliber dual-purpose (DP) gun; 2 × 40 mm (1.57 in) Bofors anti-aircraft (AA) gun mounts; 3 × 20 mm (0.79 in) Oerlikon cannon AA gun mounts

USS Peconic (AOG-68), was a type T1 Klickitat-class gasoline tanker built for the US Navy during World War II. She was named after the Peconic River, in New York.

== Construction ==
Peconic was laid down on 31 January 1945, under a Maritime Commission (MARCOM) contract, MC hull 2628, by the St. Johns River Shipbuilding Company, Jacksonville, Florida; sponsored by Mrs. Mal Haughton Jr.; acquired on a loan basis by the Navy 28 September 1945; and commissioned 29 September 1945.

== Service history ==
Peconic reported to Commander Service Force Atlantic at Norfolk, Virginia, 27 November. Because of reduced need following the war's end, she decommissioned 4 January 1946, at the Norfolk Naval Shipyard, was struck from the Navy List 21 January, and returned to the Maritime Commission (MARCOM).

She went into merchant service in 1946, as SS Voshell operated by the Maritime Transport Lines Inc. until 4 April 1948, at which time she was turned over to the Naval Transportation Service (NTS) as USNT Peconic (AOG-68) at Boston. Maritime Transport Lines Inc. continued to operate Peconic under contract for the NTS. NTS became Military Sea Transportation Service (MSTS) 1 October 1949, and the ship was then designated USNS Peconic (AOG-68).

Peconic was reinstated to the Naval Vessel Register 28 April 1950, and she continued service in MSTS until 12 November 1957, when she transferred to the Maritime Administration (MARAD) National Defense Reserve Fleet at Beaumont, Texas. She was struck from the Naval Vessel Register the same day. On 27 July 1982, she was sold for scrapping to Andy Exports Inc., she was removed from the fleet on 7 December 1982.

== Bibliography ==
- "Peconic". Dictionary of American Naval Fighting Ships. Naval History and Heritage Command. 19 August 2015. This article incorporates text from this source, which is in the public domain.
- "USS Peconic (AOG-68)". NavSource. 19 December 2014.
- "St. John's River Shipbuilding, Jacksonville FL". www.ShipbuildingHistory.com. 16 October 2010.
- Maritime Administration. "Peconic". Ship History Database Vessel Status Card. U.S. Department of Transportation, Maritime Administration.
- "USS Peconic".
