= SS C. W. Post =

Liberty ship of WWII

History

United States
- Name: C. W. Post
- Namesake: C. W. Post
- Owner: War Shipping Administration (WSA)
- Operator: United States Navigation Co.
- Ordered: as type (EC2-S-C1) hull, MC hull 2504
- Awarded: 23 April 1943
- Builder: St. Johns River Shipbuilding Company, Jacksonville, Florida
- Cost: $944.199
- Yard number: 68
- Way number: 2
- Laid down: 6 October 1944
- Launched: 8 November 1944
- Sponsored by: Marjorie Merriweather Post
- Completed: 17 November 1944
- Identification: Call sign: KYUR
- Fate: Laid up in the James River Reserve Fleet, Lee Hall, Virginia, 15 November 1947; Sold for scrapping, 21 September 1971, withdrawn from fleet, 15 October 1971

General characteristics
- Class & type: Liberty ship; type EC2-S-C1, standard
- Tonnage: 10,865 LT DWT; 7,176 GRT
- Displacement: 3,380 long tons (3,434 t) (light); 14,245 long tons (14,474 t) (max)
- Length: 441 feet 6 inches (135 m) oa; 416 feet (127 m) pp; 427 feet (130 m) lwl
- Beam: 57 feet (17 m)
- Draft: 27 ft 9.25 in (8.4646 m)
- Installed power: 2 × Oil fired 450 °F (232 °C) boilers, operating at 220 psi (1,500 kPa); 2,500 hp (1,900 kW)
- Propulsion: 1 × triple-expansion steam engine, (manufactured by General Machinery Corp., Hamilton, Ohio); 1 × screw propeller
- Speed: 11.5 knots (21.3 km/h; 13.2 mph)
- Capacity: 562,608 cubic feet (15,931 m^{3}) (grain); 499,573 cubic feet (14,146 m^{3}) (bale)
- Complement: 38–62 USMM; 21–40 USNAG
- Armament: Varied by ship; Bow-mounted 3-inch (76 mm)/50-caliber gun; Stern-mounted 4-inch (102 mm)/50-caliber gun; 2–8 × single 20-millimeter (0.79 in) Oerlikon anti-aircraft (AA) cannons and/or, 2–8 × 37-millimeter (1.46 in) M1 AA guns

SS C. W. Post was a Liberty ship built in the United States during World War II. She was named after C. W. Post, an American inventor, breakfast cereal and foods manufacturer and a pioneer in the prepared-food industry. He was the founder of what is now Post Consumer Brands.

== Construction ==
C. W. Post was laid down on 6 October 1944, under a Maritime Commission (MARCOM) contract, MC hull 2504, by the St. Johns River Shipbuilding Company, Jacksonville, Florida; she was sponsored by Marjorie Merriweather Post, the daughter of the namesake, and was launched on 8 November 1944.

== History ==
She was allocated to the United States Navigation Company on 17 November 1944. On 4 March 1948, she was laid up in the James River Reserve Fleet, Lee Hall, Virginia. On 31 May 1954, she was withdrawn from the fleet to be loaded with grain under the "Grain Program 1954"; she returned loaded on 8 June 1954. On 18 May 1956, she was withdrawn to be unloaded, she returned reloaded with grain on 25 June 1956. On 20 June 1957, she was withdrawn from the fleet to be unloaded, she returned empty on 1 July 1957. On 3 July 1958, she was withdrawn from the fleet to be loaded with grain under the "Grain Program 1958", she returned loaded on 11 July 1958. On 28 January 1960, she was withdrawn to be unloaded; she returned empty on 2 February 1960. On 24 October 1960, she was withdrawn from the fleet to be loaded with grain under the "Grain Program 1960"; she returned loaded on 6 November 1960. On 4 May 1963, she was withdrawn to be unloaded; she returned empty on 7 May 1963. She was sold for scrapping, on 21 September 1971, to Eckhardt & Co., GMBH., for $70,070. She was removed from the fleet on 15 October 1971.

== Bibliography ==
- "St. John's River Shipbuilding, Jacksonville FL". www.ShipbuildingHistory.com. 16 October 2010.
- Maritime Administration. "C. W. Post". Ship History Database Vessel Status Card. U.S. Department of Transportation, Maritime Administration.
- Davies, James (May 2004). "Specifications (As-Built)" (PDF). p. 23.
- "SS C. W. Post".
