= SS John Einig =

Liberty ship of WWII

History

United States
- Name: John Einig
- Namesake: John Einig
- Owner: War Shipping Administration (WSA)
- Operator: United States Navigation Co.
- Ordered: as type (EC2-S-C1) hull, MC hull 1220
- Builder: St. Johns River Shipbuilding Company, Jacksonville, Florida
- Cost: $1,370,126
- Yard number: 28
- Way number: 4
- Laid down: 1 December 1943
- Launched: 14 January 1944
- Sponsored by: Helen Wrenn Early
- Completed: 31 January 1944
- Identification: Call sign: KVQL
- Fate: Laid up in the, National Defense Reserve Fleet, Mobile, Alabama, 1 October 1946; Sold to Italy, 31 December 1946, removed from fleet, 3 January 1947

Italy
- Name: Aida Lauro
- Owner: Achille Lauro
- Fate: Scrapped, 1969

General characteristics
- Class & type: Liberty ship; type EC2-S-C1, standard
- Tonnage: 10,865 LT DWT; 7,176 GRT
- Displacement: 3,380 long tons (3,434 t) (light); 14,245 long tons (14,474 t) (max)
- Length: 441 feet 6 inches (135 m) oa; 416 feet (127 m) pp; 427 feet (130 m) lwl
- Beam: 57 feet (17 m)
- Draft: 27 ft 9.25 in (8.4646 m)
- Installed power: 2 × Oil fired 450 °F (232 °C) boilers, operating at 220 psi (1,500 kPa); 2,500 hp (1,900 kW)
- Propulsion: 1 × triple-expansion steam engine, (manufactured by General Machinery Corp., Hamilton, Ohio); 1 × screw propeller
- Speed: 11.5 knots (21.3 km/h; 13.2 mph)
- Capacity: 562,608 cubic feet (15,931 m^{3}) (grain); 499,573 cubic feet (14,146 m^{3}) (bale)
- Complement: 38–62 USMM; 21–40 USNAG
- Armament: Varied by ship; Bow-mounted 3-inch (76 mm)/50-caliber gun; Stern-mounted 4-inch (102 mm)/50-caliber gun; 2–8 × single 20-millimeter (0.79 in) Oerlikon anti-aircraft (AA) cannons and/or, 2–8 × 37-millimeter (1.46 in) M1 AA guns

SS John Einig was a Liberty ship built in the United States during World War II. She was named after John Einig, a former resident of Jacksonville, Florida, that had invented the 32-inch (810 mm) steam whistle nicknamed "Big Jim". Einig is also credited with building the first horseless carriage in Jacksonville, in 1896.

== Construction ==
John Einig was laid down on 1 December 1943, under a Maritime Commission (MARCOM) contract, MC hull 1220, by the St. Johns River Shipbuilding Company, Jacksonville, Florida; she was sponsored by Helen Wrenn Early, wife of White House Press Secretary Stephen Early, and was launched on 14 January 1944.

== History ==
She was allocated to the United States Navigation Co., on 31 January 1944. On 7 June 1946, she was laid up in the National Defense Reserve Fleet, Mobile, Alabama. She was sold, 31 December 1946, to Italy, for $544,506, for commercial use. She was removed from the fleet on 3 January 1947. John Einig was renamed Aida Lauro in 1947. She was scrapped in 1969.

== Bibliography ==
- "St. John's River Shipbuilding, Jacksonville FL". www.ShipbuildingHistory.com. 16 October 2010.
- Maritime Administration. "John Einig". Ship History Database Vessel Status Card. U.S. Department of Transportation, Maritime Administration.
- Davies, James (May 2004). "Specifications (As-Built)" (PDF). p. 23.
- "SS John Einig".
