= USS Piscataqua =

USS Piscataqua may refer to the following ships of the United States Navy:

- USS Piscataqua (1866), a screw steamer commissioned 21 October 1867; renamed Delaware on 15 May 1869; decommissioned 5 December 1870.
- USS Piscataqua (1869), a light-draft monitor originally named Chimo; renamed Orion 15 June 1869 and Piscataqua 10 August 1869; broken up for scrap in 1874
- USS Piscataqua (AT-49), a screw tug built as W. H. Brown in 1897; purchased by the Navy 11 May 1898 and renamed Piscataqua; commissioned 18 June 1898 for service in the Spanish–American War; decommissioned at Cavite, Philippines 10 April 1922
- USS Piscataqua (AOG-70), a T1 gasoline tanker launched 26 May 1945; but was cancelled 27 August 1945. She ultimately entered the United States Merchant Marine under the name Louden
- USS Piscataqua (AOG-80), a T1 tanker originally named Taveta and launched as Cisne 10 September 1945; activated 19 August 1950; renamed Piscataqua and designated T–AOG–80; served in both the Korean War and the Vietnam War; disposed of on 1 January 1975
