= Peconic =

Peconic may refer to:

- Peconic, New York, a hamlet in Suffolk County, New York
- Peconic Bay, two bodies of water between the North Fork and the South Fork of Long Island, New York
  - Great Peconic Bay, the body of water between the North Fork and the South Fork of Long Island, New York
  - Little Peconic Bay
- Peconic Bay Medical Center, in Riverhead, New York
- Peconic County, New York, a proposed new county in New York
- Peconic River, a tributary of Peconic Bay in Suffolk County, New York
- USS Peconic (AOG-68), a United States Navy ship
