= USS Mettawee =

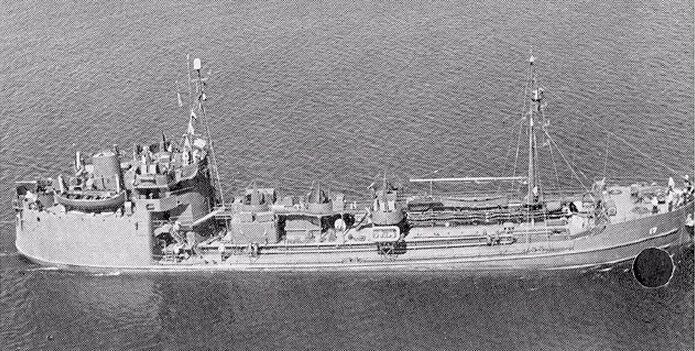
- USS Mettawee (AOG-17)

History

United States
- Name: USS Mettawee
- Namesake: Mettawee River in New York
- Ordered: as USS Clearwater (YOG-47); T1-M-A2 tanker hull
- Laid down: 13 August 1942
- Launched: 28 November 1942
- Acquired: 5 April 1943
- Commissioned: 26 August 1943
- Decommissioned: 29 March 1946
- Stricken: date unknown
- Fate: Sold for scrap on 7 January 1964

General characteristics
- Tonnage: 1,228 long tons deadweight (DWT)
- Displacement: 846 tons(lt) 2,270 tons(fl)
- Length: 220 ft 6 in (67.2 m)
- Beam: 37 ft (11.3 m)
- Draft: 17 ft (5.2 m)
- Propulsion: Diesel direct drive, single screw, 720 hp
- Speed: 10 knots (19 km/h)
- Complement: 62
- Armament: one single 3 in (76 mm) dual purpose gun mount, two 40 mm guns, three single 20 mm gun mounts

USS Mettawee (AOG-17) was a Mettawee-class T1 tanker type gasoline tanker acquired by the U.S. Navy for the dangerous task of transporting gasoline to warships in the fleet, and to remote Navy stations.

Mettawee was laid down as Clearwater (YOG-47) by Marine Maintenance Corp. (later named the East Coast Shipyard, Inc.), Bayonne, New Jersey, 13 August 1942; launched 28 November 1942; sponsored by Mrs. Charles B. Edison; renamed and reclassified Mettawee (AOG-17) 25 March 1943; acquired by the Navy from the Maritime Commission 5 April 1943; converted by Bethlehem Steel Co., Hoboken, New Jersey; and commissioned 26 August 1943.

== World War II service ==
Following shakedown off Norfolk, Virginia, from 25 September, Mettawee sailed 21 October for New York City to join a convoy for the Panama Canal Zone. She moored at Balboa until departing 3 December for the southwest Pacific Ocean, arriving Bora Bora, Society Islands, the 24th, to load supplies. Mettawee continued on to New Caledonia to debark her cargo after arrival at Nouméa 11 January 1944.

She departed 5 February for the New Hebrides, arriving Espiritu Santo 3 days later. From 14 February through April Mettawee served as station tanker off Funafuti Atoll, Ellice Islands.

=== South Pacific operations ===
On 1 May she departed Funafuti for the Solomons, arriving Tulagi the sixth. She got underway two days later on the first of many round trips, transporting aviation gas to Guadalcanal and Bougainville, Solomons; and Funafuti until the end of January 1945. Mettawee departed Tulagi 30 January for the Philippines, via Manus, Admiralties, arriving San Pedro Bay, Leyte, 17 February for supply operations in the Philippines and Borneo area through the fall of that year.

== Post-war decommissioning ==
Mettawee then got underway for the U.S. West Coast, arriving San Francisco, California, to be decommissioned at Mare Island Navy Yard 29 March 1946. She was transferred 10 September 1946 to the Maritime Commission for merchant service as Clearwater. On 7 January 1964 she was sold for scrap to National Metal & Steel Corporation.

== Military awards and honors ==
Her crew was eligible for the following medals:

- American Campaign Medal
- Asiatic-Pacific Campaign Medal
- World War II Victory Medal
- Philippine Liberation Medal
