= SS Harold O. Wilson =

Sabir Ali

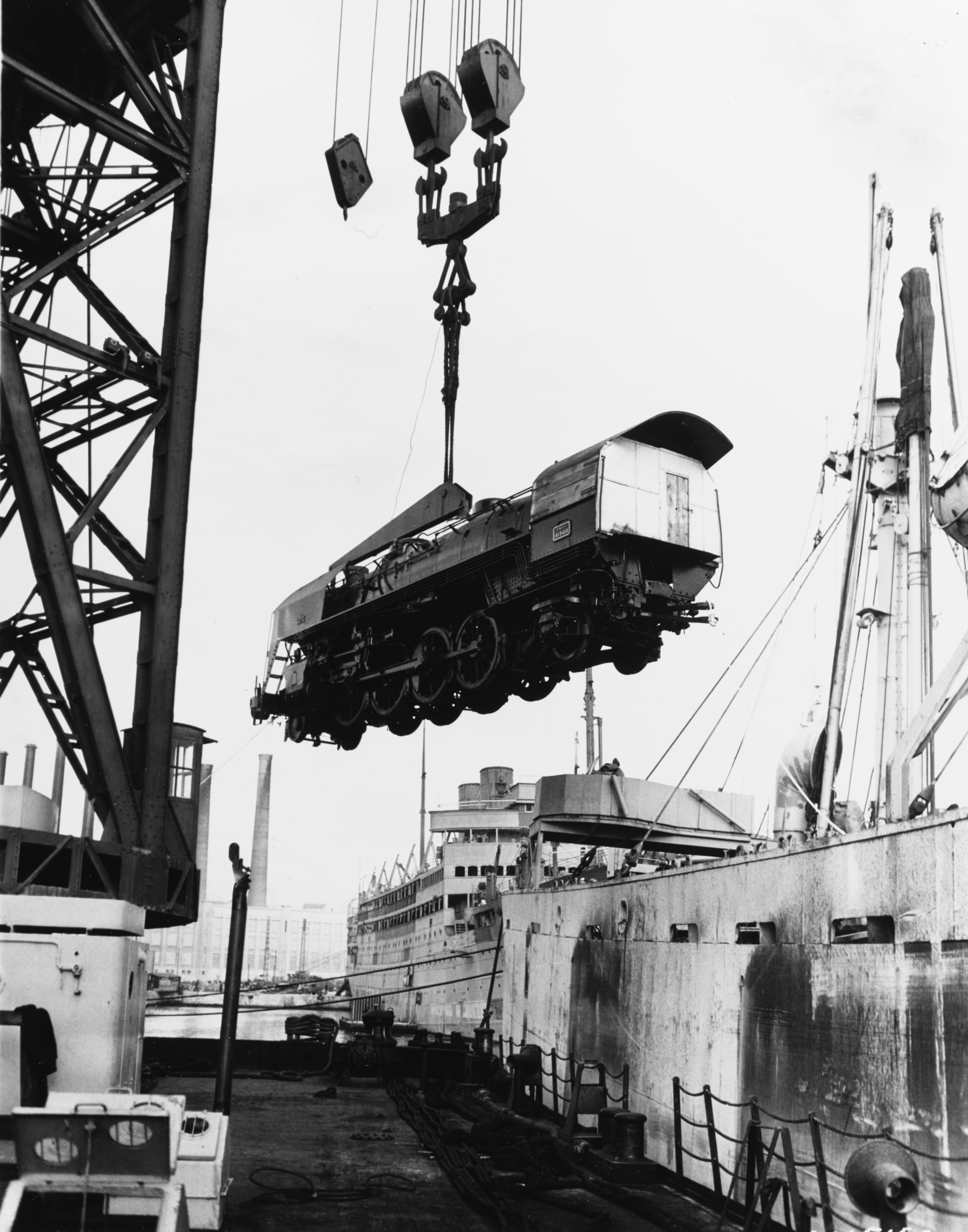
- A locomotive being unloaded from Harold O. Wilson on 3 November 1945

History

United States
- Name: Harold O. Wilson
- Namesake: Harold O. Wilson
- Ordered: as type (EC2-S-C1) hull, MC hull 2396
- Builder: J.A. Jones Construction, Brunswick, Georgia
- Cost: $803,647
- Yard number: 181
- Way number: 5
- Laid down: 12 December 1944
- Launched: 12 January 1945
- Sponsored by: Mrs. J.S. Bragdon
- Completed: 24 January 1945
- Identification: Call Signal: ANHY
- Fate: Sold for commercial use, 20 June 1947

United States
- Name: North Beacon
- Operator: Northeastern Steamship Corp.
- Acquired: 20 June 1947
- Fate: Sold, April 1955

United States
- Name: Texmar
- Operator: Bethlehem Steel
- Acquired: April 1955
- Fate: Wrecked and sold for scrapping, January 1961

General characteristics
- Class & type: Liberty ship; type EC2-S-C1, standard
- Tonnage: 10,865 LT DWT; 7,176 GRT
- Displacement: 3,380 long tons (3,434 t) (light); 14,245 long tons (14,474 t) (max)
- Length: 441 feet 6 inches (135 m) oa; 416 feet (127 m) pp; 427 feet (130 m) lwl
- Beam: 57 feet (17 m)
- Draft: 27 ft 9.25 in (8.4646 m)
- Installed power: 2 × Oil fired 450 °F (232 °C) boilers, operating at 220 psi (1,500 kPa); 2,500 hp (1,900 kW)
- Propulsion: 1 × triple-expansion steam engine, (manufactured by General Machinery Corp., Hamilton, Ohio); 1 × screw propeller
- Speed: 11.5 knots (21.3 km/h; 13.2 mph)
- Capacity: 562,608 cubic feet (15,931 m^{3}) (grain); 499,573 cubic feet (14,146 m^{3}) (bale)
- Complement: 38–62 USMM; 21–40 USNAG
- Armament: Varied by ship; Bow-mounted 3-inch (76 mm)/50-caliber gun; Stern-mounted 4-inch (102 mm)/50-caliber gun; 2–8 × single 20-millimeter (0.79 in) Oerlikon anti-aircraft (AA) cannons and/or, 2–8 × 37-millimeter (1.46 in) M1 AA guns

SS Harold O. Wilson was a Liberty ship built in the United States during World War II. She was named after Harold O. Wilson, who was lost at sea while he was an oiler on SS Flora MacDonald, that was torpedoed by German submarine U-126, 30 May 1943, off Sierra Leone.

== Construction ==
Harold O. Wilson was laid down on 12 December 1944, under a Maritime Commission (MARCOM) contract, MC hull 2396, by J.A. Jones Construction, Brunswick, Georgia; she was sponsored by Mrs. J.S. Bragdon, and launched on 12 January 1945.

== History ==
On 3 November 1945, one of the first US locomotives for the French railroad system was unloaded from Harold O. Wilson in Marseille.

She was allocated to the United States Navigation Company, on 24 January 1945. On 20 June 1947, she was sold to Northeastern Steamship Corp., and renamed North Beacon. In April 1955, she was sold to Bethlehem Steel, and renamed Texmar. In January 1961, she was wrecked and sold for scrapping.

== Bibliography ==
- "Jones Construction, Brunswick GA". www.ShipbuildingHistory.com. 13 October 2010.
- "Liberty Ships – World War II".
- Maritime Administration. "Harold O. Wilson". Ship History Database Vessel Status Card. U.S. Department of Transportation, Maritime Administration. Archived from the original on 12 December 2019.
- Davies, James (May 2004). "Specifications (As-Built)" (PDF). p. 23.
- "SS Harold O. Wilson".
