= MS Transpet =

Panamanian-American tanker

History
- Name: Avoca; Petaluma
- Namesake: Petaluma River
- Ordered: as type (T1-M-BT1) hull, MC hull 2629
- Awarded: 26 July 1944
- Builder: St. Johns River Shipbuilding Company, Jacksonville, Florida
- Cost: $1,022,203.48
- Yard number: 88
- Way number: 6
- Laid down: 14 February 1945
- Launched: 5 May 1945
- Completed: 1947
- Acquired: Acquisition canceled, 26 August 1945
- Renamed: Avoca
- Identification: Hull symbol: AOG-67
- Fate: Sold for commercial use, 30 April 1947

United States
- Name: Transpet
- Owner: National Petroleum Transport Corp.
- Fate: Sold, 1951

Panama
- Name: Transpet
- Owner: British-American Oil Company
- Operator: D.K. Ludwig
- Fate: Burnt and sank, 1951

General characteristics
- Class & type: Klickitat-class gasoline tanker
- Type: Type T1-MT-BT1 tanker
- Displacement: 1,980 long tons (2,012 t) (light); 5,970 long tons (6,066 t) (full load)
- Length: 325 ft 2 in (99.11 m)
- Beam: 48 ft 2 in (14.68 m)
- Draft: 19 ft (5.8 m)
- Installed power: 1 × Enterprise DNQ-38 Diesel engine; 800 shp (600 kW)
- Propulsion: 1 × Westinghouse main reduction gears; 1 × shaft
- Speed: 10 kn (19 km/h; 12 mph)
- Capacity: 10,465 bbl (1,663.8 m^{3}) (Diesel); 871,332 US gal (3,298,350 L; 725,536 imp gal) (Gasoline)
- Complement: 80
- Armament: 1 × 3 in (76 mm)/50 caliber dual-purpose (DP) gun; 2 × 40 mm (1.57 in) Bofors anti-aircraft (AA) gun mounts; 3 × 20 mm (0.79 in) Oerlikon cannon AA gun mounts

MS Transpet was a tanker of United States and Panamanian registry. Laid down as MV Avoca and acquired by the Maritime Commission (MARCOM) on a loan charter basis and renamed USS Petaluma (AOG-69), she was to be a type T1 Klickitat-class gasoline tanker built for the US Navy during World War II. She was named after the Petaluma River, in California. Petaluma (AOG-69) was never commissioned into the US Navy.

== Construction ==
Petaluma (AOG-69) was laid down on 14 February 1945, under a Maritime Commission (MARCOM) contract, MC hull 2629, by the St. Johns River Shipbuilding Company, Jacksonville, Florida; acquisition by the US Navy was cancelled 26 August 1945.

Petaluma was launched on 5 May 1945, and was about 85% complete when, due to the end of World War II, the ship's US Navy reassignment was canceled. Although initially restored to her original name of Avoca by her original owners, the unfinished ship was completed by the Maryland Drydock Company in Baltimore, Maryland, in October 1947, and sold to the National Petroleum Transport Corporation where she was renamed Transpet.

== Career ==
From 1947 until 1951, Transpet flew the US flag. In 1951 Transpet was registered under the Panamanian flag and placed under the operation of D.K. Ludwig of New York for the British-American Oil Company.

On 29 October 1951, the tanker departed Montreal for Halifax, loaded with 1,500,000 imperial gallons (6,800,000 L) of gasoline and kerosene. The following day, the ship suffered an explosion in the engine room while in the Gulf of St. Lawrence. Two seamen were killed in the blast; the other eighteen members of the crew abandoned the sinking ship and were rescued by the British ship Ottinge and landed at North Sydney, Nova Scotia.

In May 1954, the Minneapolis-Honeywell Regulator Company announced that its "sea scanar" device had located the wreck of Transpet at a depth of 120 feet (37 m) about 13 nautical miles (24 km) off Miscou Island. It was the first time the "sea scanar", which had been in use as a fish finder off the West Coast of the United States, had been used in a salvage operation and the first wreck located using it.

== Bibliography ==
- "Petaluma I (AOG-79)". Dictionary of American Naval Fighting Ships. Naval History and Heritage Command. 20 August 2015. This article incorporates text from this source, which is in the public domain.
- "Petaluma (AOG-69)". NavSource. 21 December 2018.
- "St. John's River Shipbuilding, Jacksonville FL". www.ShipbuildingHistory.com. 16 October 2010.
- "Petaluma".
- "Transpet (5615779)". Miramar Ship Index.
- "Two perish in sinking of Panamanian tanker". The New York Times. Associated Press. 1 November 1951. p. 59.
- "News of interest in shipping field". The New York Times. Canadian Press. 15 May 1954. p. 33.
