= USS Ala =

Tugboat of the United States Navy

History

United States
- Name: USS Ala (YT-139)
- Namesake: An Indian word for abalone shell.
- Builder: Puget Sound Navy Yard, Bremerton, WA
- Laid down: 23 September 1939
- Launched: 6 November 1939
- In service: 11 March 1940
- Stricken: 20 May 1965
- Fate: Ran aground and then sank in Kuluk Bay near the Naval Station, Adak, 19 May 1964

General characteristics
- Displacement: 325 t
- Length: 100 ft (30 m)
- Beam: 25 ft (7.6 m)
- Draft: 11 ft 5 in (3.48 m)
- Propulsion: 1000hp diesel-electric, two Enterprise engines
- Speed: 13 knots (24 km/h)
- Complement: 10
- Armament: two 0.5 in (12.7 mm) machine guns

USS Ala (YT-139) was a United States Navy yard tug laid down on 23 September 1939 at Bremerton, Washington, by the Puget Sound Navy Yard; launched on 6 November 1939; and completed on 11 March 1940.

Placed in service in the 13th Naval District, Ala operated out of Bremerton, providing local tug and tow service. On occasion, however, in the course of such prosaic but vitally important work without which a well-balanced fleet could not exist, circumstances sometimes called for selfless heroism on board yardcraft as well as combatant vessels. Late in the afternoon watch on 16 November 1941, the harbor tug was moving three ammunition lighters alongside the pier at the Naval Ammunition Depot, Puget Sound. With most of the deck force gathered aft, engaged in securing the lighters, no one apparently noticed Seaman 2nd class L.A. Minton—who was not a qualified swimmer—lose his footing and slip and fall over the side, forward. Once the men began coming from aft, they noted Minton’s absence. A hasty search yielded the sight of the missing sailor, clad in heavy clothing about four feet below the surface of the water, sinking between two of the lighters, repeatedly forced under by the high winds and flooding tide. Instantly sizing up the situation, Seaman 1st Class George E. Martin dove into the water and rescued Minton, saving him from drowning. Secretary of the Navy Frank Knox later commended Martin for his “prompt and heroic action,” and the petty officer received a Life Saving Medal from the United States Treasury Department.

With the onset of hostilities soon thereafter, Ala continued carrying out her humble but invaluable tasks. On 15 April 1944, with the Alaskan portion of the 13th Naval District established as the 17th Naval District, Ala was assigned to the new entity. A month later, on 15 May 1944, she underwent reclassification as a large harbor tug and a redesignation as YTB-139. Following the war, Ala was reassigned to the 13th Naval District and she operated in and around Puget Sound until 1954. At that time, she returned to Alaskan waters under the operational control of the 17th Naval District's Commandant. Ala spent the remaining decade of her Navy career serving in the Aleutians and along the Alaskan coast. In February 1962, she was reclassified a medium harbor tug and redesignated YTM-139. Her activities came to an abrupt halt on 19 May 1964, however, when she ran aground and then sank in Kuluk Bay near the Naval Station, Adak.

Ala was stricken from the Navy list on 20 May 1965.
