= Enterprise Engine and Foundry Co. =

American engine foundry

- Industry: Manufacturing
- Products: Engines

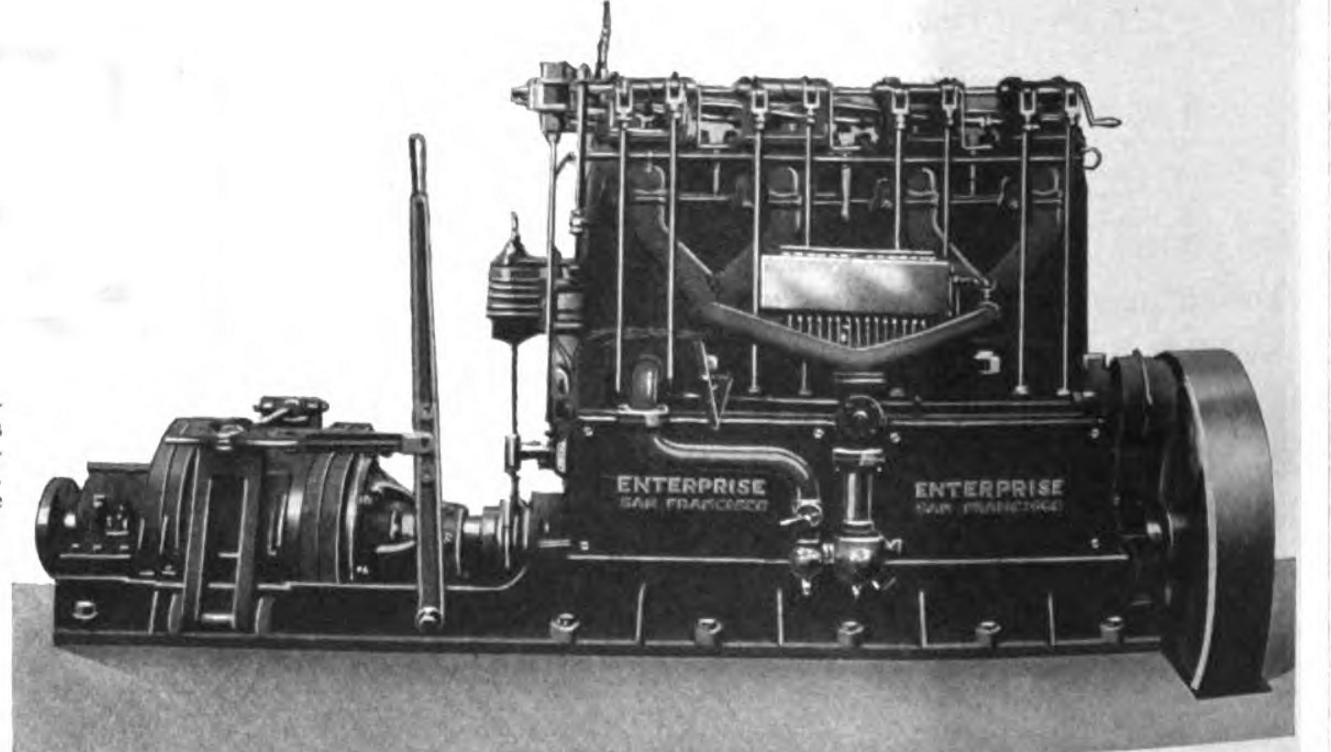
Profile view of Enterprise Engine. 1918

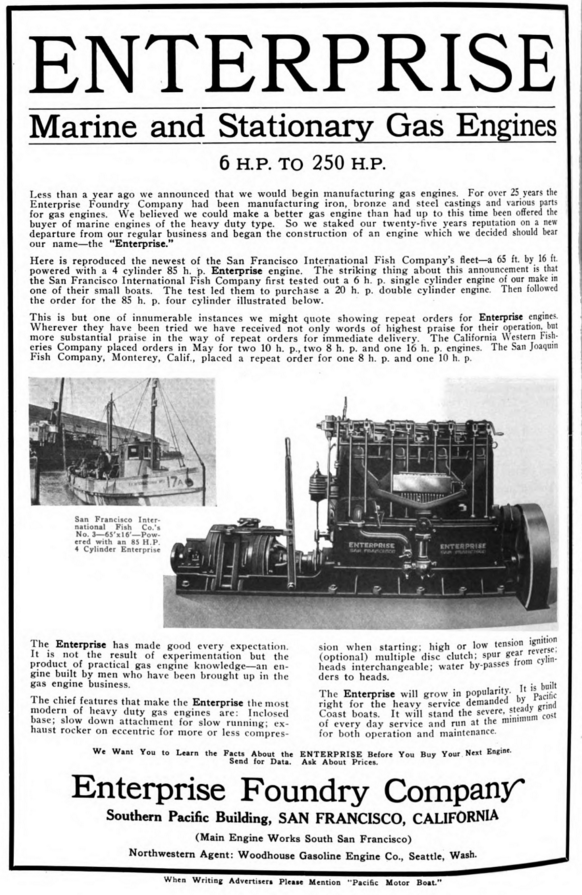
Advertisement from Pacific Motorboat Magazine 1918

The Enterprise Foundry Company was incorporated in 1908. On 28 November 1940 the company name was changed to Enterprise Engine & Foundry Company to reflect the changed nature of the business. The original foundry was established in 1886.

The company continued to make large diesel engines into the late 1940s. There are a few known Enterprise engines remaining.

== Beginning ==
In 1886, Martens and two business partners, James William Heaney and A. Anderson, developed a new business supplying industrial equipment castings. Their primary focus was on gold mining machinery, consisting mainly of compression cylinder castings for large engines. After the notorious 1906 San Francisco earthquake and fire, the Enterprise Engine and Machinery Company played a significant role in the rebuilding of the city. Their recovery activities provided Martens and his partners additional opportunities to stimulate the growth of and the momentum to expand their business.

== Crucible steel ==
In 1915, the company acquired a crucible steel foundry. Shortly after this purchase, Martens and his partners established a brass and bronze foundry in Los Angeles. In 1917, the company constructed an electric arc furnace for use in its steel foundry. This was the only foundry of its type on the west coast, and it ultimately replaced the old crucible steel process. In the same year, a new engine department was created, and a team of engineers was hired to design and manufacture various types of heavy-duty engines fuelled by gas and distillates.

The Iron Age in January 1925 estimated 35 foundries to be operating in the San Francisco Bay area, employing 1500 men. Enterprise foundry employed 300 in three plants. One at 19th and Alabama, one at Fremont and Folsom (37.78813°N 122.39363°W, see also United Engineering Co.), and one in South San Francisco.

A December 1928 survey by the Iron Trade Review found 1 open hearth furnace and 2 1-ton electric furnaces (for forging ingots) in the South San Francisco Works. The Enterprise Foundry Co. was in that survey among the smallest of the West Coast steel producers.

== Engines ==
The first engines produced by the team were single-cylinder, rated at eight horsepower. The following engines were twin-cylinder, rated at 20 horsepower (15 kW). In a short time, designs were developed for engine models capable of producing up to 250 horsepower (190 kW).

Stemming from the success of their gas and distillate fuel engines, the engineers set out to create a line of diesel engines. At this time, the cost of operating a diesel engine was approximately 20 cents per hour, compared to the $2.75 for gasoline engines. This economical Enterprise Diesel engine became very popular in a number of industries which had previously utilized gas powered engines.

== Merger with Western Machinery Company ==
In 1924, The Enterprise Engine and Machinery Company merged with the Western Machinery Company of Los Angeles. This merger made the new organization the premier manufacturer of internal combustion engines on the west coast. In an effort to diversify the range of products, the company began selling oil burners and food processing equipments.

== World War II ==
During World War II, Enterprise built hundreds of diesel engines for the United States Navy and Maritime Commission for tugs, harbor craft, small vessels, and auxiliary electric generators on larger ships. In addition, many Enterprise engines were sold to drive electric power generators in cities and towns across America.

During that time the company operated three plants: in Richmond, South San Francisco and San Francisco

In early 1941 the capacity of the San Francisco plant at 18th between Alabama and Florida streets was tripled with the addition of a new 19,500sqft machine shop. 37.761725°N 122.411655°W

- USS Nightingale (AMc-149): one 350 hp diesel
- Pusey & Jones of Wilmington, Delaware: 2 tugs for the Curtis Bay Towing Company in 1939 using four-cycle 6cyl. 320hp engines, detailed article:
- 2 engines for Powhatan built at Boston Navy Yard in 1938
- 10 650hp 6cyl. engines for 5 diesel-electric harbor tugs building in the Puget Sound, Charleston and Norfolk Navy Yards. (detailed article): Woban, Ala, Wahtah, Heekon, Nokomis
- tugboat Keith at Commercial Iron Works in Portland, Oregon: two 1,000hp four-cycle 6cyl. engines (detailed article)
- the Dutch East Indies government ordered 29 totaling 18,680hp in 1941 (before May).
- 12 of 32 Aloe-class net laying ships (all 12 that were built in West Coast yards) were equipped with Enterprise engines in a diesel-electric configuration.
- 12 of 12 Klickitat-class gasoline tankers (T1 tanker) by the St. Johns River Shipbuilding Company in Jacksonville, Florida: Klickitat, Michigamme, Nanticoke, Nodaway, Peconic, Petaluma, Picataqua, Quinnebaug, Sebasticook, Kiamichi, Tellico, Truckee
- APc: 23 .. 31, 101 ... 103, 108 ... 111
- 6 V2-ME-A1 tugs built by Birchfield Shipbuilding & Boiler Co. in Tacoma, Washington (1,000hp 8-cyl. direct-drive): Port Angeles, Port Blakely, Port Discovery, Port Ludlow, Port Madison, Port Orchard
- 8 Army tugs (LT-1 ... LT-8) built by Jakobson Shipyard, New York in 1943 each using one four-cycle 8-cyl. engine in direct drive configuration (detailed article)
- TODO V4-M-A1 tugs
- TODO C1-M-AV1 auxiliaries

Some photographs of the facilities and of a 6 cylinder diesel engine:

== Merger with Adel Precision Products Company ==
In the mid-1950s, after many decades of growth, Enterprise Engine & Foundry Company merged with Adel Precision Products Company of Burbank, part of the General Metals Corporation. This gave rise to a substantial increase of the company's engineering and production capacity and its testing and research capability. The Enterprise had the necessary resources allowing them to manufacture diesel engines ranging from 73 horsepower (54 kW) to 7,700 horsepower (5,700 kW). These are now being utilized in almost every conceivable type of prime-mover application from powering boats and pumping oil to generate electricity. From its modest beginnings in 1886, Enterprise had become a mammoth division of a major American corporation.

== Developments since 1960 ==
Between 1960 and 1990, Enterprise Engine & Foundry Company changed its ownership numerous times. These transitional decades were accompanied by a major downturn in domestic demand for large power engines. The strong US dollar and rising interest rates hurt Enterprise's export sales. In the late 1960s, Enterprise Engine & Foundry Company was purchased by Delaval Turbine. Then in the 1970s, Delaval Turbine was acquired by Transamerica Corporation. In 1987, Transamerica elected to spin off the Delaval operations to its shareholders in the form of a dividend. The name was changed to IMO Delaval. In 1988, IMO Delaval sold the Enterprise after market services to Cooper Industries, which in turn, spun off its oil and gas related holdings to Cameron Corporation, previously known as Cooper Cameron Corporation. Cooper Machinery Services is the current original equipment manufacturer for Enterprise engines.
