= SS Richard K. Call =

Liberty ship of WWII

History

United States
- Name: Richard K. Call
- Namesake: Richard K. Call
- Owner: War Shipping Administration (WSA)
- Operator: United States Navigation Company
- Ordered: as type (EC2-S-C1) hull, MC hull 2473
- Awarded: 23 April 1943
- Builder: St. Johns River Shipbuilding Company, Jacksonville, Florida
- Cost: $1,128,059
- Yard number: 37
- Way number: 1
- Laid down: 21 February 1944
- Launched: 15 April 1944
- Sponsored by: Mrs. Lee S. White
- Completed: 28 April 1944
- Identification: Call sign: KXBB
- Fate: Laid up in the, James River Reserve Fleet, Lee Hall, Virginia, 17 December 1947; Laid up in the, Hudson River Reserve Fleet, Jones Point, New York, 26 April 1952; Sold for scrapping, 12 January 1970, removed from fleet, 16 April 1970

General characteristics
- Class & type: Liberty ship; type EC2-S-C1, standard
- Tonnage: 10,865 LT DWT; 7,176 GRT
- Displacement: 3,380 long tons (3,434 t) (light); 14,245 long tons (14,474 t) (max)
- Length: 441 feet 6 inches (135 m) oa; 416 feet (127 m) pp; 427 feet (130 m) lwl
- Beam: 57 feet (17 m)
- Draft: 27 ft 9.25 in (8.4646 m)
- Installed power: 2 × Oil fired 450 °F (232 °C) boilers, operating at 220 psi (1,500 kPa); 2,500 hp (1,900 kW)
- Propulsion: 1 × triple-expansion steam engine, (manufactured by General Machinery Corp., Hamilton, Ohio); 1 × screw propeller
- Speed: 11.5 knots (21.3 km/h; 13.2 mph)
- Capacity: 562,608 cubic feet (15,931 m^{3}) (grain); 499,573 cubic feet (14,146 m^{3}) (bale)
- Complement: 38–62 USMM; 21–40 USNAG
- Armament: Varied by ship; Bow-mounted 3-inch (76 mm)/50-caliber gun; Stern-mounted 4-inch (102 mm)/50-caliber gun; 2–8 × single 20-millimeter (0.79 in) Oerlikon anti-aircraft (AA) cannons and/or, 2–8 × 37-millimeter (1.46 in) M1 AA guns

SS Richard K. Call was a Liberty ship built in the United States during World War II. She was named after Richard K. Call, an American attorney and politician, the 3rd and 5th territorial governor of Florida. Before that, he was elected to the Florida Territorial Council and as a delegate to the US Congress from Florida.

== Construction ==
Richard K. Call was laid down on 21 February 1944, under a Maritime Commission (MARCOM) contract, MC hull 2473, by the St. Johns River Shipbuilding Company, Jacksonville, Florida; she was sponsored by Mrs. Lee S. White, a yard employee, and was launched on 15 April 1944.

== History ==
She was allocated to the United States Navigation Company, on 28 April 1944. On 17 December 1947, she was laid up in the James River Reserve Fleet, Lee Hall, Virginia. On 26 April 1952, she was laid up in the Hudson River Reserve Fleet, Jones Point, New York. On 27 April 1953, she was withdrawn from the fleet to be loaded with grain under the "Grain Program 1953", she returned loaded on 7 May 1953. On 22 January 1958, she was withdrawn to be unload, she returned on empty 30 January 1958. On 13 August 1958, she was withdrawn from the fleet to be loaded with grain under the "Grain Program 1958", she returned loaded on 28 August 1958. On 15 April 1959, she was withdrawn to be unload, she returned on empty 22 April 1959. She was sold for scrapping, 12 January 1970, to Union Minerals and Alloys Corporation, for $41,273.54. She was removed from the fleet on 16 April 1970.

== Bibliography ==
- "St. John's River Shipbuilding, Jacksonville FL". www.ShipbuildingHistory.com. 16 October 2010.
- Maritime Administration. "Richard K. Call". Ship History Database Vessel Status Card. U.S. Department of Transportation, Maritime Administration.
- Davies, James (May 2004). "Specifications (As-Built)" (PDF). p. 23.
- "SS Richard K. Call".
