= SS Robert F. Burns =

Liberty ship of WWII

History

United States
- Name: Robert F. Burns
- Namesake: Robert F. Burns
- Owner: War Shipping Administration (WSA)
- Operator: United States Navigation Co., Inc.
- Ordered: as type (EC2-S-C5) hull, MC hull 3146
- Builder: J.A. Jones Construction, Panama City, Florida
- Cost: $842,691
- Yard number: 106
- Way number: 3
- Laid down: 30 June 1945
- Launched: 28 August 1945
- Completed: 19 September 1945
- Identification: Call sign: AOHQ
- Fate: Placed in the, Beaumont Reserve Fleet, Beaumont, Texas, 25 April 1949; Sold for scrapping, 19 January 1967, removed from fleet, 11 May 1967

General characteristics
- Class & type: Liberty ship; type EC2-S-C5, boxed aircraft transport
- Tonnage: 10,600 LT DWT; 7,200 GRT
- Displacement: 3,380 long tons (3,434 t) (light); 14,245 long tons (14,474 t) (max)
- Length: 441 feet 6 inches (135 m) oa; 416 feet (127 m) pp; 427 feet (130 m) lwl
- Beam: 57 feet (17 m)
- Draft: 27 ft 9.25 in (8.4646 m)
- Installed power: 2 × Oil fired 450 °F (232 °C) boilers, operating at 220 psi (1,500 kPa); 2,500 hp (1,900 kW)
- Propulsion: 1 × triple-expansion steam engine, (manufactured by Filer and Stowell, Milwaukee, Wisconsin); 1 × screw propeller
- Speed: 11.5 knots (21.3 km/h; 13.2 mph)
- Capacity: 490,000 cubic feet (13,875 m^{3}) (bale)
- Complement: 38–62 USMM; 21–40 USNAG
- Armament: Varied by ship; Bow-mounted 3-inch (76 mm)/50-caliber gun; Stern-mounted 4-inch (102 mm)/50-caliber gun; 2–8 × single 20-millimeter (0.79 in) Oerlikon anti-aircraft (AA) cannons and/or, 2–8 × 37-millimeter (1.46 in) M1 AA guns

SS Robert F. Burns was a Liberty ship built in the United States during World War II. She was named after Robert F. Burns, a Merchant marine killed when U-66 torpedoed Topa Topa, 350 mi (560 km) off North of Cayenne, French Guiana, 29 August 1942.

== Construction ==
Robert F. Burns was laid down on 30 June 1945, under a Maritime Commission (MARCOM) contract, MC hull 3146, by J.A. Jones Construction, Panama City, Florida; she was launched on 28 August 1945.

== History ==
She was allocated to United States Navigation Co.Inc., on 19 September 1945. On 25 April 1949, she was placed in the, Beaumont Reserve Fleet, Beaumont, Texas. She was sold for scrapping, 19 January 1967, to Southern Scrap Materials, for $45,188.88. She was removed from the fleet, 11 May 1967.

== Bibliography ==
- "Jones Construction, Panama City FL". www.ShipbuildingHistory.com. 13 October 2010.
- Maritime Administration. "Robert F. Burns". Ship History Database Vessel Status Card. U.S. Department of Transportation, Maritime Administration.
- Davies, James (May 2004). "Specifications (As-Built)" (PDF). p. 23.
- "SS Robert F. Burns".
- "THE PEOPLE BEHIND THE NAMES". Armed-guard.com.
- "SS Topa Topa". www.Wrecksite.eu. 29 August 2011.
