= SS Chief Osceola =

World War II Liberty ship of the United States

History

United States
- Name: Chief Osceola
- Namesake: Chief Osceola
- Owner: War Shipping Administration (WSA)
- Operator: United States Navigation Company
- Ordered: as type (EC2-S-C1) hull, MC hull 2322
- Builder: J.A. Jones Construction, Panama City, Florida
- Cost: $950,246
- Yard number: 63
- Way number: 2
- Laid down: 28 August 1944
- Launched: 4 October 1944
- Sponsored by: Mrs. W. T. Flythe
- Completed: 19 October 1944
- Identification: Call sign: KTEE
- Fate: Sold for commercial use, 30 January 1947

Greece
- Name: George D. Gratsos
- Owner: George D. Gratsos Ltd (1947–1949); Gratsos Bros (1949–1967)
- Fate: Grounded, 26 July 1965, scrapped, 1967

General characteristics
- Class & type: Liberty ship; type EC2-S-C1, standard
- Tonnage: 10,865 LT DWT; 7,176 GRT
- Displacement: 3,380 long tons (3,434 t) (light); 14,245 long tons (14,474 t) (max)
- Length: 441 feet 6 inches (135 m) oa; 416 feet (127 m) pp; 427 feet (130 m) lwl
- Beam: 57 feet (17 m)
- Draft: 27 ft 9.25 in (8.4646 m)
- Installed power: 2 × Oil fired 450 °F (232 °C) boilers, operating at 220 psi (1,500 kPa); 2,500 hp (1,900 kW)
- Propulsion: 1 × triple-expansion steam engine, (manufactured by Filer and Stowell, Milwaukee, Wisconsin); 1 × screw propeller
- Speed: 11.5 knots (21.3 km/h; 13.2 mph)
- Capacity: 562,608 cubic feet (15,931 m^{3}) (grain); 499,573 cubic feet (14,146 m^{3}) (bale)
- Complement: 38–62 USMM; 21–40 USNAG
- Armament: Varied by ship; Bow-mounted 3-inch (76 mm)/50-caliber gun; Stern-mounted 4-inch (102 mm)/50-caliber gun; 2–8 × single 20-millimeter (0.79 in) Oerlikon anti-aircraft (AA) cannons and/or, 2–8 × 37-millimeter (1.46 in) M1 AA guns

SS Chief Osceola was a Liberty ship built in the United States during World War II. She was named after Chief Osceola, resistance leader of the "Seminole", during the Second Seminole War.

== Construction ==
Chief Osceola was laid down on 28 August 1944, under a Maritime Commission (MARCOM) contract, MC hull 2322, by J.A. Jones Construction, Panama City, Florida; sponsored by Mrs. W. T. Flythe, wife of director of public relation JAJCC, and launched on 4 October 1944.

== History ==
She was allocated to United States Navigation Company, 19 October 1944.

She was sold, on 30 January 1947, to George D. Gratsos Ltd, for $563,292.75 and commercial use. She was flagged in Greece and renamed George D. Gratos. On 26 July 1965, she was severely damaged when she was grounded in the Chacao Channel, Chile. She was scrapped in Valencia, in 1967.

== Bibliography ==
- "Jones Construction, Panama City FL". www.ShipbuildingHistory.com. 13 October 2010.
- Maritime Administration. "Chief Osceola". Ship History Database Vessel Status Card. U.S. Department of Transportation, Maritime Administration. This article incorporates text from this source, which is in the public domain.
- Davies, James (May 2004). "Specifications (As-Built)" (PDF). p. 23.
- "SS Chief Osceola".
