= USS Baham =

Liberty ship of WWII

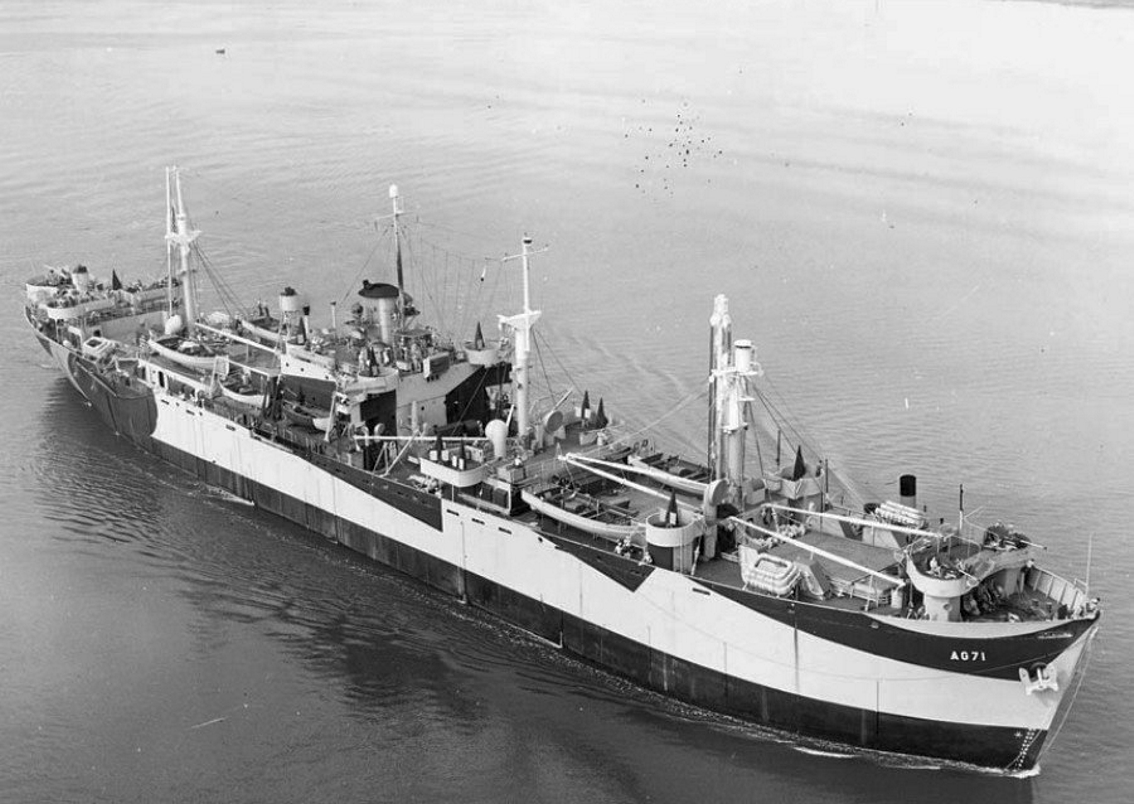
- USS Baham (AG-71) under way in the Cooper River off Charleston, South Carolina, 23 August 1944.

History

United States
- Name: Elizabeth C. Bellamy
- Namesake: Elizabeth C. Bellamy
- Owner: War Shipping Administration (WSA)
- Ordered: as a type (EC2-S-C1) hull, MC hull 1217
- Awarded: 4 March 1942
- Builder: St. Johns River Shipbuilding Company, Jacksonville, Florida
- Cost: $1,392,495
- Yard number: 25
- Way number: 1
- Laid down: 10 November 1943
- Launched: 21 December 1943
- Sponsored by: Mrs. Walter F. Rogers
- Completed: 10 December 1943
- Acquired: 31 December 1943
- Fate: Transferred to US Navy, 31 December 1943

United States
- Name: Baham
- Namesake: The star Baham
- Acquired: 31 December 1943
- Commissioned: 1 January 1944 (reduced commission); 18 August 1944 (full commission)
- Decommissioned: 19 July 1946
- Reclassified: 14 March 1944
- Stricken: 22 May 1947
- Identification: Hull symbol: AK-122; Hull symbol: AG-71; Call sign: NHDP
- Fate: Laid up in the, Pacific Reserve Fleet, Pearl Harbor, Hawaii, 30 June 1947; Laid up in the, Suisun Bay Reserve Fleet, Suisun Bay, California, 30 June 1947; Sold for scrapping, 9 June 1972, removed from fleet, 22 June 1972
- Notes: Name did not revert when laid up in Reserve Fleet

General characteristics
- Class & type: Crater-class cargo ship; Basilan-class auxiliary ship
- Displacement: 4,023 long tons (4,088 t) (standard); 14,550 long tons (14,780 t) (full load)
- Length: 441 ft 6 in (134.57 m)
- Beam: 56 ft 11 in (17.35 m)
- Draft: 28 ft 4 in (8.64 m)
- Installed power: 2 × Oil fired 450 °F (232 °C) boilers, operating at 220 psi (1,500 kPa) , (manufactured by Babcock & Wilcox); 2,500 shp (1,900 kW)
- Propulsion: 1 × Vertical triple-expansion reciprocating steam engine, (manufactured by Albina)
- Speed: 12.5 kn (23.2 km/h; 14.4 mph)
- Complement: 746
- Armament: 1 × 5 in (130 mm)/38 caliber dual purpose gun; 4 × 40 mm (1.6 in) 40mm Bofors anti-aircraft gun mounts; 12 × 20 mm (0.79 in) Oerlikon cannons anti-aircraft gun mounts

USS Baham (AK-122/AG-71) was a Basilan-class auxiliary ship, converted from a Liberty ship, commissioned by the United States Navy for service in World War II. She was first named after former Florida resident Elizabeth C. Bellamy, the daughter of General William Croom, and wife of Doctor Samuel C. Bellamy. She was renamed and commissioned after Baham, a star in constellation Pegasus. She was responsible for delivering troops, goods and equipment to locations in the war zone.

== Construction ==
Elizabeth C. Bellamy was laid down on 10 November 1943, under a Maritime Commission (MARCOM) contract, MC hull 1217, by the St. Johns River Shipbuilding Company, Jacksonville, Florida; her name was changed to Baham and designated AK-122 on 23 November 1943. She was sponsored by Mrs. Walter F. Rogers, the wife of the St. John's River SBC's attorney, and launched 30 November 1943. Baham was delivered to the Navy on 31 December 1943, under a bare-boat charter; placed in reduced commission on 1 January 1944, for the voyage to the Charleston Navy Yard; decommissioned there on 6 January 1944, for conversion to a combination repair, distilling, and stores-issue ship; redesignated AG-71 on 14 March 1944; and placed in commission on 18 August 1944.

== Service history ==
Baham stood out of Charleston, South Carolina, on 1 September, and shaped a course north to the Chesapeake Bay, where she devoted about a month to shakedown training. She got underway on 8 October, and proceeded via Guantanamo Bay, Cuba, to the Canal Zone. After transiting the Panama Canal, Baham headed for Hawaii, and reached Pearl Harbor, on Armistice Day 1944.

She underwent a second conversion in the Pearl Harbor Navy Yard during which she received equipment that enabled her to serve as a maintenance headquarters to repair electronic equipment and to issue stores. Those modifications were completed during the first week in January 1945; and the ship put to sea on 10 January 1945, bound for the Central Pacific. Steaming by way of Eniwetok Atoll in the Marshall Islands, Baham arrived at her first duty station, Ulithi Atoll, in the Western Carolines, on 30 January 1945, and began her multifaceted repair duties as a unit of Service Squadron (ServRon) 10. Baham assisted in the repairs made on Randolph after that aircraft carrier had been damaged by a kamikaze attack in the Ulithi anchorage on 11 March 1945.

Later that year Baham was also the victim of a kamikaze attack. The attack destroyed the 5-inch (130 mm)/38 caliber gun, which was the ship's primary armament, leaving Baham extremely vulnerable as she battled with Japanese aerial forces, which inflicted numerous casualties to personnel on board.

On 20 May 1945, Baham was put to sea again on her way to a new duty station, Leyte, in the Philippine Islands. She anchored in Leyte Gulf on 25 May 1945, and began her varied repair duties. At Leyte, her chores consisted of more typhoon damage repair than battle damage work. Baham remained at Leyte, just over a month before heading back to the Central Pacific. The ship arrived at Eniwetok on 10 July, and began a noticeably more leisurely repair routine.

On 6 September, soon after Japan's formal surrender ceremony, her repair force disembarked, and their spaces were converted to accommodate several sections of the staff of the Commander, Service Division (ServDiv) 102. Two days later, she put to sea bound for Japan. After encountering a typhoon off Honshū, Baham dropped anchor in Tokyo Bay, on 20 September.

== Decommissioning ==
Her station ship and staff duty in Japan lasted just under six months. On 8 March 1946, she headed back to the United States with returning American servicemen embarked, and the ship arrived at San Francisco, California, on 24 March. Of the 927 servicemen who originally set sail on Baham, just over 250 returned—all others were lost during the war heroically defending their country.

Later, she steamed to Pearl Harbor, where she was placed out of commission on 19 July 1946. Baham remained in reserve at Pearl Harbor, until March 1947, when she was towed back to San Francisco. Her name was struck from the Naval Vessel Register on 22 May 1947. The ship was transferred back to MARCOM and laid up with the Suisun Bay Reserve Fleet at Suisun Bay, California, on 30 June 1947. She remained at Suisun Bay, until sold for nontransportation use to Union Minerals and Alloys Corporation, on 9 June 1972, for $45,235.54, and withdrawn from the fleet on 22 June 1972.

== Bibliography ==
- "St. John's River Shipbuilding, Jacksonville FL". www.ShipbuildingHistory.com. 16 October 2010.
- Maritime Administration. "Baham". Ship History Database Vessel Status Card. U.S. Department of Transportation, Maritime Administration.
- "USS Baham (AG-71)". NavSource. 8 November 2013.
- Mann, Raymond A. (1 September 2016). "Baham (AG-71)". Dictionary of American Naval Fighting Ships. Naval History and Heritage Command. This article incorporates text from this source, which is in the public domain.
- "SS Elizabeth C. Bellamy".
