= Frank Park =

American politician (1864–1925)

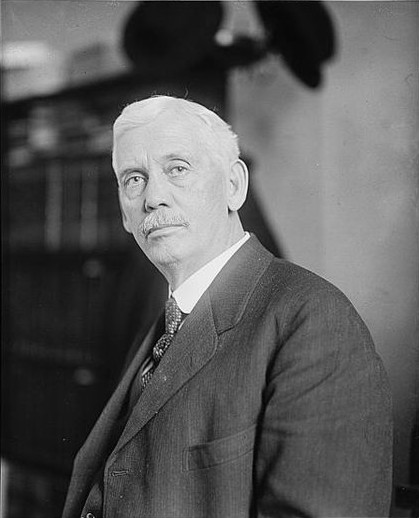

Member of the U.S. House of Representatives from Georgia's 2nd district
- In office November 4, 1913 – March 3, 1925
- Preceded by: Seaborn Roddenbery
- Succeeded by: E. Eugene Cox

Personal details
- Born: March 3, 1864 Tuskegee, Alabama, US
- Died: November 20, 1925 (aged 61) Fort Lauderdale, Florida, US
- Party: Democratic
- Education: University of Georgia
- Occupation: Lawyer, engineer

Frank Park (March 3, 1864 – November 20, 1925) was an American politician, educator, lawyer and jurist from the state of Georgia.

== Early years and education ==
Park was born in Tuskegee, Alabama, in 1864 to James Fletcher Park and Emma Augusta Park (née Bailey). His father was the principal and founder of Park High School (later known as Tuskegee Military Institute for Boys), and later served as mayor of Lagrange, Georgia. The younger Park graduated from local public schools before attending the University of Georgia in Athens (UGA), where he was a member of the Phi Kappa Literary Society. He taught from 1882 through 1885 then worked as a railway civil engineer from 1885 until 1889. Park then attended the Atlanta Medical College and graduated in 1891. He studied law and was admitted to the state bar in 1891, at which time he started a private law practice.

== Judicial service ==
In 1898, Park became a judge in the county court and served in that position until 1903 when he became a judge in the Albany judicial circuit. He served in that position until 1908. Judge Park served on the board of trustees for the Georgia Agricultural and Mechanical School in Tifton from 1911 until 1915.

== Political activity and election ==
From 1891 to 1902, Park served as chair of the Democratic executive committee for Worth County, Georgia. From 1902 through 1904 Park was the chair of the Democratic congressional committee for Georgia's 2nd congressional district.

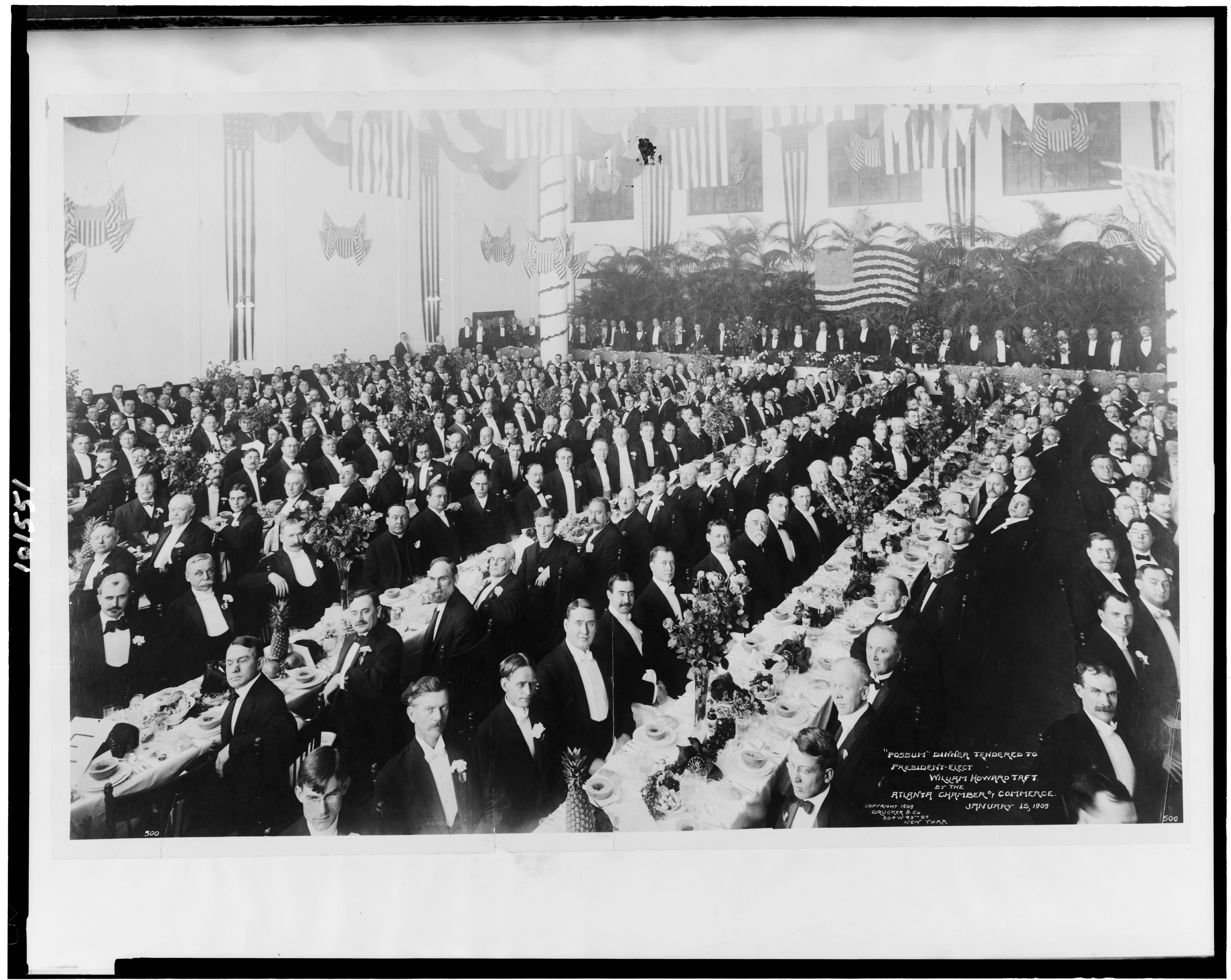
"Possum" dinner tendered to President-elect William Howard Taft by the Atlanta Chamber of Commerce, January 15, 1909

Despite his affiliation with the Democratic Party, in February 1909, Judge Park helped organize a banquet to honor Republican President-elect William Howard Taft. The dinner, for 500, was held at the newly constructed Armory-Auditorium (now the Atlanta Municipal Auditorium). The feast was prepared by the head chef of the Piedmont Hotel, with the assistance of three cooks from Park's plantation. The event was hosted by the Atlanta Chamber of Commerce, with Asa Candler, founder of The Coca-Cola Company acting as toastmaster. Judge Park volunteered to provide 100 "fat possums", captured from the wilds of Worth County, as the headline feature of the banquet. The "Possum and 'Taters" dinner, as it came to be known, also included 100 gallons of persimmon beer. The chief chef of the Piedmont Hotel created a special opossum basting sauce for the occasion. In addition to the opossum and sweet potatoes ('Taters), the menu included turtle soup, broiled Georgia shad, spiced watermelon, boiled wild turkey with oyster sauce, and quail en casserole.

The opossum was brought to President-elect Taft in a chafing dish. It was reported that "Five hundred eyes were on the President-elect as he lifted the top of the dish and gazed at the boast of Georgia." Taft is said to have remarked that it was "The best dish I have toasted in weeks". After the dinner, boosters presented Taft with a small plush marsupial they dubbed "Billy Possum". Their expectation was that Billy Possum would soon outshine Taft's predecessor's famous plush toy, the Teddy Bear. Stone and Webster Public Service Journal wrote that "Thousands of little possums are being made, which promise to be as favorably received as was the teddy bear". While that was not to be, public reaction to the dinner was exceptionally positive. Response to the dinner was so positive that the chef of the Piedmont Hotel received letters from New York restaurants stating that they had placed "Possum and 'Taters" on their menus, and requesting quantities of persimmon beer.

=== 1913 election ===
In 1913, Park won a special election to fill Georgia's vacant 2nd district seat in the United States House of Representatives during the 63rd United States Congress. Judge Park prevailed over fellow Democratic opponent Roscoe Luke by 5.1 points. The vacancy was the result of incumbent Seaborn Roddenbery's death earlier in the year. Like all members of the Georgia Congressional delegation at that time, Park was a Democrat. After finishing the partial term of his predecessor, he was reelected to four additional full terms in that seat. During his tenure in office, Park resided in Sylvester, Georgia, the county seat of Worth County.

==== Controversial acts ====
In December 1913, shortly after taking office, Park introduced legislation to make changes to the Second Amendment of the Constitution of the United States to allow state and federal authorities to regulate the practice of "pistol toting". Park stated that his experience as a judge had taught him that the "evil practice of pistol toting" was responsible for a large percentage of homicides in the United States. The freshman congressman wrongly predicted that his measure would receive the "overwhelming support of congress and the states."

In 1914, Park introduced a bill that would ban all African-Americans from being commissioned as military or naval officers.

==== Fighting political corruption ====
In 1914, Park introduced a resolution of impeachment against Daniel Thew Wright, Associate Justice of the Supreme Court of the District of Columbia for corruption. Wright resigned from the Court ahead of the threatened impeachment proceedings.

In 1915, Park made charges against corrupt District of Columbia police chief Richard H. Sylvester, who was already under fire for the way his police force failed to protect participants in a Women's Suffrage march. Like Judge Wright before him, Sylvester chose to resign ahead of an investigation.

=== 1916 election ===
In 1916 Park was challenged in the Democratic primary by Edward Eugene Cox, who had succeeded Park as judge of the Albany judicial circuit when Park stepped down. Cox did what he could to stir up public interest in his campaign, even sending Congressman Park a telegram challenging him to a debate at the July 4 festivities in Thomasville, Georgia. Cox continued pressing. On August 10. 1916 he held a large barbecue rally in Lucile, Georgia which attracted voters from Early County and surround areas. It was reported that "several hundred" voters attended. Park was able to best Cox in the 1916 congressional race, and would not see another challenge to his seat until 1924.

==== Representing constituent concerns ====
In the aftermath of the sinking of the ocean liner Lusitania, which cost the lives of numerous Americans, President Wilson issued a warning to the German government about attacking ships carrying American citizens. But many southerners took a different view. The Gore-McLemore resolution, introduced by two southern members of Congress directed the President to warn Americans against traveling aboard foreign ships of belligerent nations, and even proposed confiscating passports of citizens who failed to comply. In keeping with that sentiment, and supporting the isolationist views of his constituents, Park affirmed that he opposed any policy that would "hurl the sons of the South to death and destruction because some fool, or idiot, or nonpatriotic rascal" chose to sail on a "belligerent armed vessel".

Park was also mindful of representing the farmers of his district in Georgia who counted agriculture, particularly the harvesting of pecans and peanuts, as a primary concern. His congressional district produced a large percentage of the pecans grown in Georgia. Park pushed through a more than 50% increase in funding for pecan growers, in the annual Agriculture Appropriations Act of 1917. In addition to nuts and legumes, farmers in Park's 2nd Congressional District harvested a large quantity of "yellow yams" (actually sweet potatoes). With the help of President Woodrow Wilson (who had strong ties to Georgia) Park persuaded the Army's Quartermaster General to add "yellow yams" to the army's menu, increasing both sales and consumer awareness of the vegetable.

In a consumer protection measure Park introduced legislation requiring that manufacturers of clothing and shoes disclose the nature of "the material entering the composition of the article manufactured".

=== 1924 election defeat ===
Park faced another contested election in 1924. On July 19, 1923 a front-page article in the Early County News reported that a mass meeting of Tift County voters had taken place, with the express purpose of placing the name of Judge Raleigh Eve in nomination for the Second Congressional District, to replace Frank Park. Eve was the presiding judge of the Tift Judicial Circuit, and a former judicial colleague of Park. The paper reported that "The auditorium was packed and enthusiasm marked the reception of five or six speeches preceding the formal nomination. The nomination was unanimous." Nonetheless, it was Park's previous challenger, E. E. Cox who proved Park's undoing, defeating him in the Democratic primary of September 10, 1924. Out of roughly 13,000 votes cast, Park lost decisively by a margin of nearly 3,000 vote. Once in office, Cox was re-elected thirteen times. In all, Cox served from March 4, 1925, until his death in 1952.

== Death and legacy ==
On November 20, 1925, a few months after leaving office, Park died in Fort Lauderdale, Florida. He was buried in White Springs Cemetery in White Springs, Florida, next to his wife Emma Augusta Bridges Park, who had died the previous year. Park was a member of the fraternal order of Masons, and the masonic symbol appears on his gravestone.

The WWII liberty ship, the SS Frank Park, laid down on June 10, 1944 in Brunswick, Georgia, was named after the late congressman. The SS Frank Park was scrapped in 1962.

U.S. House of Representatives
Preceded by Seaborn Roddenbery	Member of the U.S. House of Representatives from Georgia's 2nd congressional district November 4, 1913 – March 3, 1925	Succeeded by E. Eugene Cox
