= United States Navigation Company =

Former Shipping Company

- Industry: Shipping, Shipbroker
- Founded: 1917 in New York City, United States
- Defunct: 1981
- Fate: sold in 1979.
- Key people: Ed Oelsner President; John William Oelsner; Arnie Portocarrer; Johannes W. Praesent; Robert W. Boissevain; James A. Lyons; T. C. Hopkins

United States Navigation Company was founded by Edward Carl Wilhelm Oelsner (1888–1973) in New York City in 1917. Oelsner was a Prussian-born German (born in Bialystok, Podlaskie, Poland), who came to America in 1908. In 1915 became a manager of the Hamburg America Line's New York office. In 1917 he became a steamship broker, he then founded his own steamship brokerage firm, United States Navigation Company. United States Navigation Company's first clients were the Hamburg-American Line and North German Lloyd Line. Next Oelsner entered into a joint venture with Biehl & Company chartering ships that serviced the Gulf of Mexico ports. United States Navigation Company when went from just a shipbroker to a ship owner, with the purchase of 1885 SS City of Salisbury, a 397-ton cargo ship. On March 7, 1973, Oelsner died, he and his wife, Eva, were on vacation in Torremolinos, Spain. United States Navigation Company continued doing business. In 1979 the United States Navigation Company was sold and in 1981 closed. The United States Navigation Company supported the World War II effort with its ship and as an operator of United States owned ships.

United States Navigation Company was a US broker for a number of shipping lines:

- A partial list of Lines:
- Hamburg-American Line, of Germany
- North German Lloyd, of Germany
- Watts Line, of UK, of Watts, Watts & Co. Ltd.
- Reardon-Smith Line, of UK
- Iino Kaiun Kaisha, Ltd., of Japan
- Baron Line, of Scotland's H. Hogarth & Company
- K Line, of Japan, Kawasaki Kisen Kaisha, Ltd.
- Kousal line

== Joint Venture ==
United States Navigation Co. and the Marine Services Company Limited founded a subsidiary, the Canada South Africa Line of Montreal, Canada in 1945.

== World War II ==
United States Navigation Company fleet of ships that were used to help the World War II effort. During World War II United States Navigation Company operated Merchant navy ships for the United States Shipping Board. During World War II United States Navigation Company was active with charter shipping with the Maritime Commission and War Shipping Administration. United States Navigation Company s operated Liberty ships and Victory ships for the merchant navy. The ship was run by its United States Navigation Company crew and the US Navy supplied United States Navy Armed Guards to man the deck guns and radio.

== Ships ==
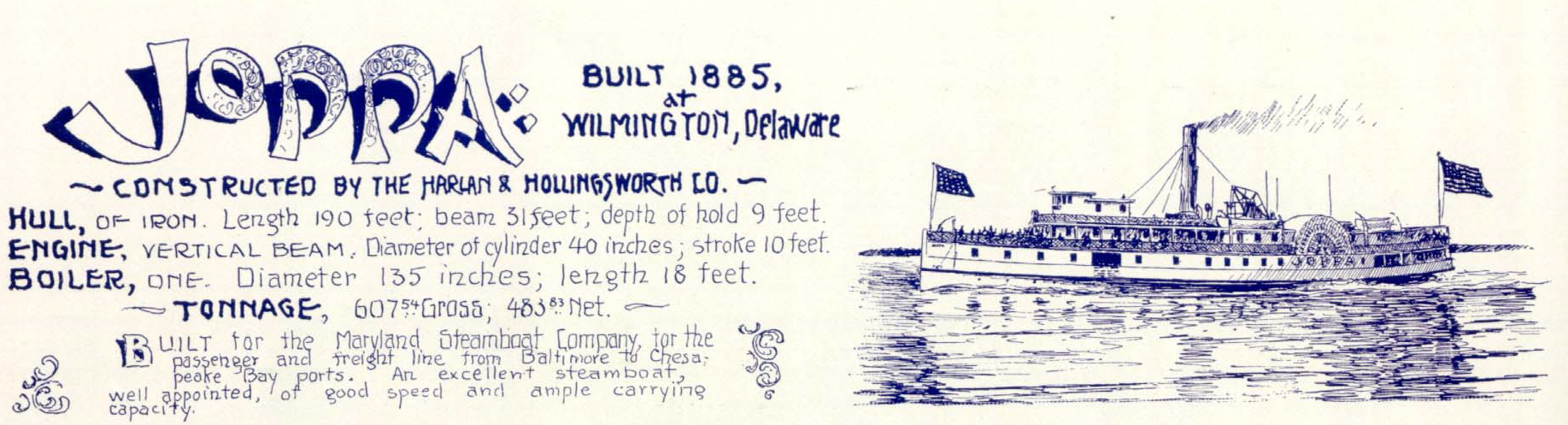
SS City of Salisbury as the SS Joppa

  - Ships owned:
- Fort Meigs T2 tanker (1949 to 1950)
- City of Salisbury, purchased in 1941 as Joppa, built in 1885
- Big Chief
- At its peak in 1950 United States Navigation Company had 75 ships, many were surplus World War II ships.
- Operator for World War II only:
- SS Audacious (1913)
- SS Vittorin (also named Guantanamo and Comerio)

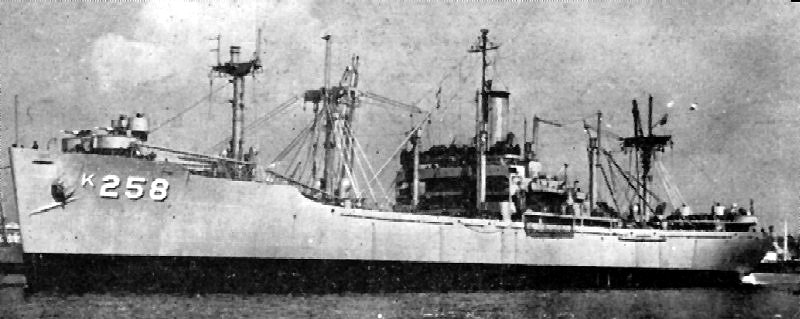
A Victory ship of World War II

Liberty ship of World War II

  - World War II :
  - Liberty Ships:
- SS C. W. Post
- SS John Einig
- SS Robert F. Burns
- SS John Einig
- SS Frank Park
- E. A. Peden
- Wallace M. Tyler
- Walter Kidde
- SS Harold O. Wilson
- Howard L. Gibson Oct. 14, 1944 had a fire at after collision with Geo. W. McKnight, was towed to Casablanca, then New York City, a loss not repaired
- Charles Dauray
- David Wilmot *
- SS James K. Paulding
- SS Richard K. Call
- SS Chief Osceola
- James I. McKay
- SS Jasper F. Cropsey
- SS J. Howland Gardner
- SS James F. Harrell
- SS James Eagan Layne
  - Victory ships:
- Lynchburg Victory
- St. Augustine Victory
- Webster Victory, Troopship

Post World War II:

- El Coston
- SS Registan (1910)

  - Korean War operator of:
- Harry L. Glucksman (MSS-1)
- Carthage (AG-185)
- MSS-1
- George Uhler
- Donald H. Holland
- SS Harry L. Glucksman
- SS American Victory now a museum ship

== See also ==
- World War II United States Merchant Navy
