= SS Frank Park =

World War II Liberty ship of the United States

History

United States
- Name: Frank Park
- Namesake: Frank Park
- Ordered: as type (EC2-S-C1) hull, MC hull 2367
- Builder: J.A. Jones Construction, Brunswick, Georgia
- Cost: $1,075,502
- Yard number: 152
- Way number: 6
- Laid down: 10 June 1944
- Launched: 21 July 1944
- Sponsored by: Mrs. Prince G. Finlayson
- Completed: 31 July 1944
- Identification: Call Signal: WRFW
- Fate: Laid up in National Defense Reserve Fleet, Wilmington, North Carolina, 28 June 1948; Sold for scrapping, 8 May 1962

General characteristics
- Class & type: Liberty ship; type EC2-S-C1, standard
- Tonnage: 10,865 LT DWT; 7,176 GRT
- Displacement: 3,380 long tons (3,434 t) (light); 14,245 long tons (14,474 t) (max)
- Length: 441 feet 6 inches (135 m) oa; 416 feet (127 m) pp; 427 feet (130 m) lwl
- Beam: 57 feet (17 m)
- Draft: 27 ft 9.25 in (8.4646 m)
- Installed power: 2 × Oil fired 450 °F (232 °C) boilers, operating at 220 psi (1,500 kPa); 2,500 hp (1,900 kW)
- Propulsion: 1 × triple-expansion steam engine, (manufactured by Joshua Hendy Iron Works, Sunnyvale, California); 1 × screw propeller
- Speed: 11.5 knots (21.3 km/h; 13.2 mph)
- Capacity: 562,608 cubic feet (15,931 m^{3}) (grain); 499,573 cubic feet (14,146 m^{3}) (bale)
- Complement: 38–62 USMM; 21–40 USNAG
- Armament: Varied by ship; Bow-mounted 3-inch (76 mm)/50-caliber gun; Stern-mounted 4-inch (102 mm)/50-caliber gun; 2–8 × single 20-millimeter (0.79 in) Oerlikon anti-aircraft (AA) cannons and/or, 2–8 × 37-millimeter (1.46 in) M1 AA guns

SS Frank Park was a Liberty ship built in the United States during World War II. She was named after Frank Park, a United States representative from Georgia.

== Construction ==
Frank Park was laid down on 10 June 1944, under a United States Maritime Commission (MARCOM) contract, MC hull 2367, by J.A. Jones Construction, Brunswick, Georgia; she was sponsored by Mrs. Prince G. Finlayson, and launched on 21 July 1944.

== History ==
She was allocated to the United States Navigation Co., on 31 July 1944. On 8 June 1950, she was laid up in the National Defense Reserve Fleet in Wilmington, North Carolina. On 8 May 1962, she was sold for scrapping to Northern Metals Co., for $47,407. She was removed from the fleet on 17 May 1962.

== Bibliography ==
- "Jones Construction, Brunswick GA". ShipbuildingHistory.com. 13 October 2010.
- "Liberty Ships – World War II".
- Maritime Administration. "Frank Park". Ship History Database Vessel Status Card. U.S. Department of Transportation, Maritime Administration. Archived from the original on 12 December 2019.
- Davies, James (May 2004). "Specifications (As-Built)" (PDF). p. 23.
- "SS Frank Park".
