= USS Powhatan (YT-128) =

Tugboat of the United States Navy

History

United States
- Name: USS Powhatan
- Namesake: Native American chief Powhatan
- Builder: Boston Navy Yard, Boston, Massachusetts
- Laid down: 28 March 1938
- Launched: 10 June 1938
- Completed: 16 September 1938
- Decommissioned: 1976
- Reclassified: YTM-128 on 15 May 1944
- Fate: Foundered while under tow to the scrapyard in 1976

General characteristics
- Type: Yard tug
- Displacement: 406 tons
- Length: 110 ft 11 in (33.81 m)
- Beam: 24 ft 0 in (7.32 m)
- Draft: 10 ft 6 in (3.20 m)
- Propulsion: 2 Enterprise diesel engines
- Speed: 10 knots (18.5 km/h)
- Complement: 13
- Armament: 2 x .50-caliber (12.7-mm) machine guns

The fifth USS Powhatan (YT-128) was a yard tug that served in the United States Navy from 1938 to 1976. She was reclassified YTM-128 in 1944.

USS Powhatan (YT-128) was laid down on 28 March 1938 by the Boston Navy Yard, Boston, Massachusetts and launched o 10 June 1938. She was completed and delivered to the U.S. Navy on 16 September 1938.

Powhatan served at Newport, Rhode Island, from 1938 to 1958. She was reclassified YTM-128 on 15 May 1944. She was active at Naval Station Argentia, Newfoundland, from 1958 to 1963. In 1963 she began service in the 10th Naval District at San Juan, Puerto Rico, where she remained through at least 1970.

Her career from 1970 through 1976 requires further research.

Powhatan was sold for scrap in 1976, and was subsequently lost while under tow by USNS San Juan to a scrapper in the Carolinas.
