= USS Crux =

Liberty ship of WWII

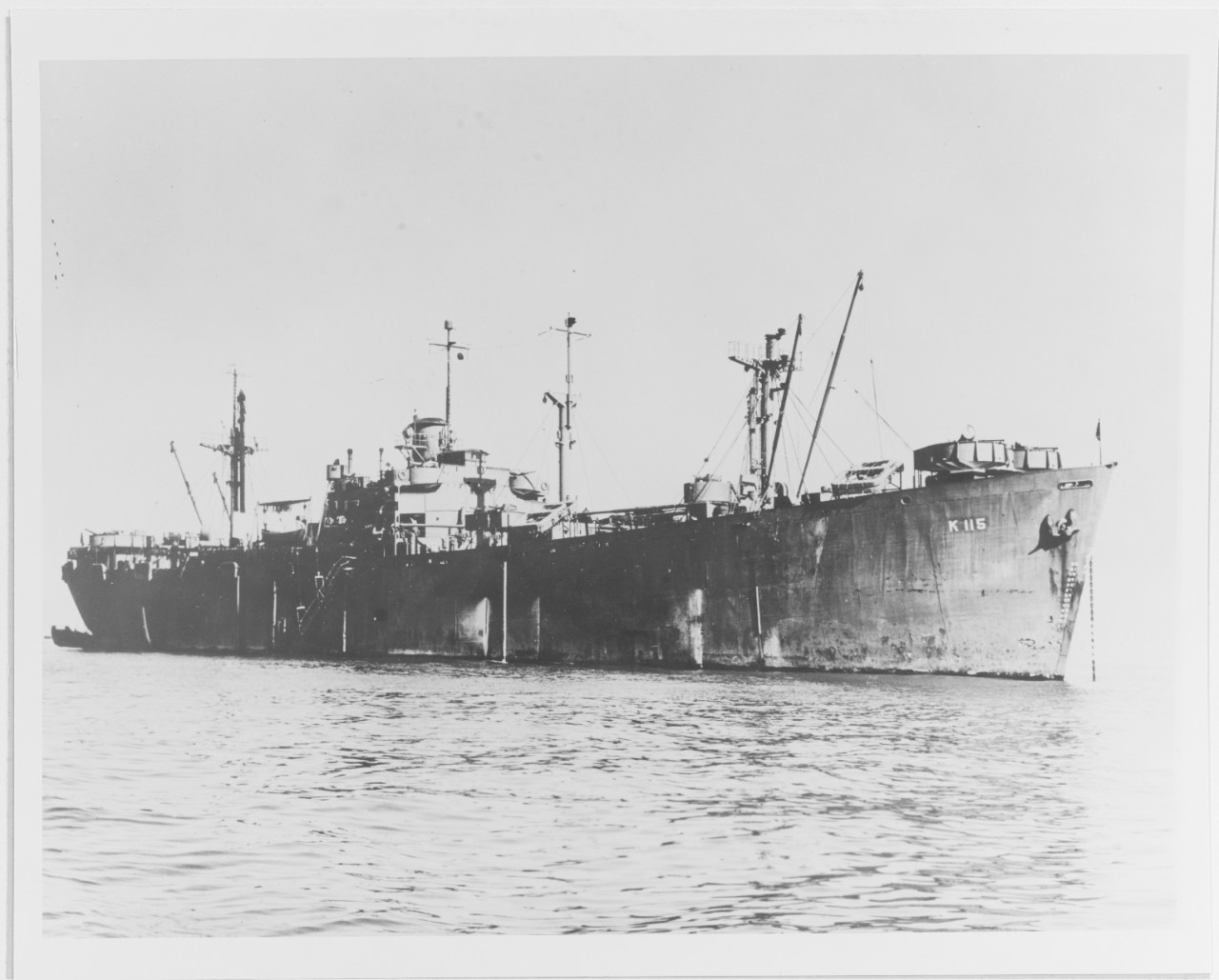
- USS Crux (AK-115)

History

United States
- Name: Peter Stuyvesant
- Namesake: Peter Stuyvesant
- Owner: War Shipping Administration (WSA)
- Ordered: as a type (EC2-S-C1) hull, MC hull 1212
- Awarded: 4 March 1942
- Builder: St. Johns River Shipbuilding Company, Jacksonville, Florida
- Cost: $1,412,652
- Yard number: 20
- Way number: 2
- Laid down: 27 September 1943
- Launched: 16 November 1943
- Sponsored by: Mrs. Frank D. Arthur
- Completed: 27 November 1943
- Identification: Call sign: KUYK
- Fate: Transferred to US Navy, 27 November 1943

United States
- Name: Crux
- Namesake: The constellation Crux
- Acquired: 27 November 1943
- Commissioned: 17 March 1944
- Decommissioned: 31 January 1946
- Stricken: 25 February 1946
- Identification: Hull symbol: AK-115; Call sign: NKTJ
- Fate: Sold for scrapping, 30 November 1961, removed from fleet, 19 December 1961
- Notes: Name reverted to Peter Stuyvesant when laid up in Reserve Fleet

General characteristics
- Class & type: Crater-class cargo ship
- Displacement: 4,023 long tons (4,088 t) (standard); 14,550 long tons (14,780 t) (full load)
- Length: 441 ft 6 in (134.57 m)
- Beam: 56 ft 11 in (17.35 m)
- Draft: 28 ft 4 in (8.64 m)
- Installed power: 2 × Oil fired 450 °F (232 °C) boilers, operating at 220 psi (1,500 kPa) , (manufactured by Combustion Engineering); 2,500 shp (1,900 kW)
- Propulsion: 1 × Vertical triple-expansion reciprocating steam engine, (manufactured by General Machinery Corp., Hamilton, Ohio); 1 × screw propeller
- Speed: 12.5 kn (23.2 km/h; 14.4 mph)
- Capacity: 7,800 t (7,700 long tons) DWT; 444,206 cu ft (12,578.5 m^{3}) (non-refrigerated)
- Complement: 206
- Armament: 1 × 5 in (130 mm)/38-caliber dual-purpose gun; 4 × 40 mm (1.6 in) 40 mm Bofors anti-aircraft gun mounts; 6 × 20 mm (0.79 in) Oerlikon cannons anti-aircraft gun mounts

USS Crux (AK-115) was a Crater-class cargo ship, converted from a Liberty Ship, commissioned by the US Navy for service in World War II. She was first named after Peter Stuyvesant, a Dutch politician who served as the last Dutch director-general of the colony of New Netherland from 1647 until it was ceded provisionally to the English in 1664. She was renamed and commissioned after Crux, a constellation centered on four stars in the southern sky in a bright portion of the Milky Way. She was responsible for delivering troops, goods and equipment to locations in the war zone.

== Construction ==
Peter Stuyvesant was laid down on 27 September 1943, under a Maritime Commission (MARCOM) contract, MC hull 1212, by the St. Johns River Shipbuilding Company, Jacksonville, Florida; sponsored by Mrs. Frank D. Arthur, of Miami, and launched on 16 November 1943. She was transferred to the US Navy 27 November 1943, and renamed Crux. She was commissioned 17 March 1944.

== Service history ==
Departing Norfolk, Virginia, 4 May 1944, Crux arrived at Espiritu Santo 14 June. From 20 June to 10 April 1944, Crux repeatedly loaded cargo at Brisbane, Australia, for such ports as Milne Bay, Finschhafen, Langemak Bay, Port Moresby, and Hollandia in New Guinea, and Manus, Admiralty Islands.

Her supply base was shifted to Subic Bay, Philippine Islands, in April 1945, and from 16 April to 15 October 1945, she carried cargo from that port to Humboldt Bay, and Mios Woendi, New Guinea, and Nissan Atoll, Bismarck Archipelago. Taking homeward-bound servicemen on board at Manila Bay, Crux sailed 15 November for San Francisco, California, arriving 10 December.

== Decommissioning ==
The ship was decommissioned there and returned to the Maritime Commission (MARCOM) on 31 January 1946, and entered the Suisun Bay Reserve Fleet at Suisun Bay, California. Crux was stricken from the Navy list on 25 February 1946.

Resuming the name Peter Stuyvesant, the ship remained in reserve into the 1960s. She was sold for scrapping to the Union Minerals and Alloys Corporation, on 30 November 1961, for $58,689.89. She was removed from the fleet on 19 December 1961.

== Military awards and honors ==
Crux's crew was eligible for the following campaign medals and ribbons:

- American Campaign Medal
- Asiatic-Pacific Campaign Medal
- World War II Victory Medal
- Philippines Liberation Medal

== Bibliography ==
- "St. John's River Shipbuilding, Jacksonville FL". www.ShipbuildingHistory.com. 16 October 2010.
- Maritime Administration. "Peter Stuyvesant". Ship History Database Vessel Status Card. U.S. Department of Transportation, Maritime Administration.
- "USS Crux (AK-115)". NavSource. 13 June 2014.
- "Crux". Dictionary of American Naval Fighting Ships. Naval History and Heritage Command. 6 July 2015. This article incorporates text from this source, which is in the public domain.
- "SS Peter Stuyvesant".
