= T1 tanker =

Class of tanker ships

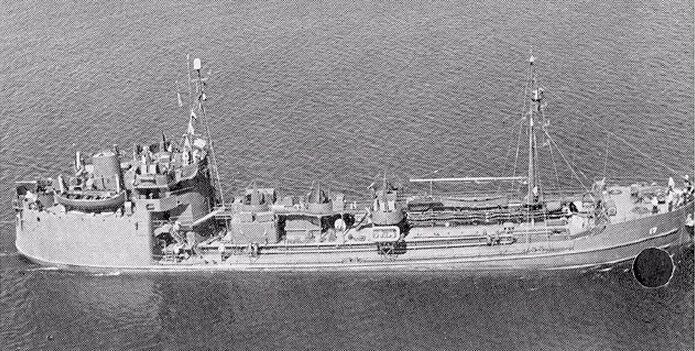
USS Mettawee, a 1942, T1-M-A2 tanker

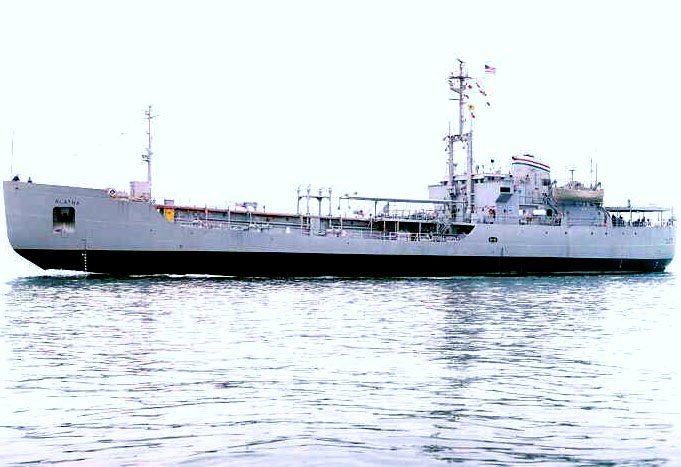
USNS Alatna, 1956 T1 tanker

The T1 tanker or T1 are a class of sea worthy small tanker ships used to transport fuel oil before and during World War II, Korean War and Vietnam War. The T1 tanker classification is still in use today. T1 tankers are about 200 to 250 feet (61 to 76 m) in length and are able to sustain a top speed of about 12 knots (22 km/h; 14 mph). The hull designation AO is used by the US Navy to denote the ship is a T1 oil tanker and AOG that the T1 is a gasoline tanker. The small size allows the T1 to enter just about any sea port or to anchor around a small island, this was very useful during the Pacific War. The T1 tanker can carry about 48,000 to 280,000 bbls. Some T1 tankers were used to transport goods other than oil, a few were used for black oil-crude oil, diesel, chemicals and rarely bulk cargo like grain. T1 tankers are also called liquid cargo carriers. The T1 tanker has about a 6,000 to 35,000 deadweight tonnage (DWT) of cargo. The small size also gives the ships short turn around time for repair, cleaning, loading and unloading. A T1 tanker carrying dirty cargo, like crude oil needs a few weeks of labor to clean before carrying clean cargo. Most T1 ships during World War II were named after major oil fields.

T1 tankers are operated by the US Navy, War Shipping Administration and United States Maritime Commission. Some T1s were loaned to England in the Lend-Lease program for World War II, after the war most were returned to the US. After World War II many of the T1 ships were sold to for civilian use. Each T1 had emergency life rafts on the boat deck. The ships had cargo booms and piping to load and unload fuel. During war time the T1 are armed for protection with deck guns. A typical ship may have one single 3"/50 dual purpose gun, two 40 mm guns and three single Oerlikon 20 mm cannon. A T1 at war time normally had a crew of 38 and up to 130. If operating as a United States Merchant Marine ship, the crew would be a mix of civilian Merchant Mariners and United States Navy Armed Guards to man the guns.

== US classes ==
- T1-M-A1 tanker: Called a small Coastal tanker, Includes the Mettawee-class gasoline tanker. Diesel powered 800 hp, 10 knots max. Tonnage Deadweight: 1,600, Tonnage Full Load: 2,900, Dimensions: 221 feet long, Width 37 ft, First Navy commissioning in 1943. Built by: Barnes-Duluth SB Co. of Duluth, Minnesota. A total of eight T1-M-A1 tankers were completed for World War II. Clearwater/USS Mettawee built in 1943 and USS Tongue River/Pasquotank built in 1943. Spindletop, Cotton Valley, Rouseville, Golden Meadow built by Lancaster Ironworks, Perryville, Maryland.
  - Barnes-Duluth Shipbuilding, MN: 12
  - Todd Galveston, TX: 8
  - Lancaster Iron Works, MD: 4
  - East Coast Shipyards, NJ: 2
  - 2 of 34 Mettawee-class gasoline tankers
    - Mettawee (AOG-17), Pasquotank (AOG-18)
- T1-M-A2 tanker: Includes the Mettawee-class gasoline tanker, 221 ft, diesel powered 800 hp, 10 knots max., Deadweight: 1,453 Full Load: 2,700, dimensions: 220'6" long, Width 37 ft, Max. depth 12 ft 10 in. First Navy commissioning in 1943. Gasoline tanker, AOG, built by East Coast Shipyards Inc. of Bayonne, New Jersey. First ship USS Seekonk.
  - East Coast Shipyards, NJ: 28
  - Todd Galveston, TX: 4
  - 32 of 34 Mettawee-class gasoline tankers
    - Sakatonchee (AOG-19) ... Waupaca (AOG-46)
    - Manokin (AOG-60) ... Klaskanine (AOG-63)
- T1-MT-BT1 tanker: Klickitat class, Gasoline tankers, first in class USS Klickitat. Enterprise diesel powered 800 hp, 11 knots max., Deadweight: 4,000, full load: 5,970, dimensions: 325 ft 4 in long, Width 48 ft, Max. depth 19 ft, Diesel 10,465 bbls, Gasoline 871,332 gals, Crew: officers 8, enlisted 72. First Navy commissioning in 1945. Built by St. John's River SB Corp. of Jacksonville, Florida. Total T1-M-BT1 gasoline tankers-AOG completed 12. Third ship USS Nanticoke
  - St. Johns River Shipbuilding Company, FL: 12
  - 12 of 12 Klickitat-class gasoline tanker
    - Klickitat (AOG-64) ... Truckee (AOG-75)
- T1-M-BT2 tanker: Tonti class and Rincon class Gasoline tanker. First in class USNS Tonti and USNS Rincon. Tonti class: Diesel electric 1018 hp, 11 knots max., Deadweight: 4933 LT, Carry 30,122 bbls, dimensions: 301.8 ft long, Width 60.92 ft, Max. depth 22.55 ft. First Navy commissioning in 1945. Rincon class: Gasoline diesel engine, 10 knots max., 6,047 long tons (6,144 t) (light) 325 ft long, width 48 ft, Max. depth 19 ft, Crew 38.
  - Todd Houston Shipbuilding, TX: 14
  - J.A. Jones Construction Panama City, FL: 6
- T1-MT-M1 tanker: Patapsco-class gasoline tanker Diesel electric system, Twin screws, 14 knots max., Capacity 680,000 gallons in 10 tanks about 2,000 tons, dimensions: 310 ft 9 in long, Width 48 ft 7 in, Max. depth 15 ft 0 in. Crew: World War II: 7 officers 120 enlisted, Vietnam: 7 officers 80 enlisted. First in class USS Patapsco.
  - Cargill, MN: 18
  - Todd Tacoma Shipyard, WA: 5
  - 23 of 23 Patapsco-class gasoline tanker
    - Patapsco (AOG-1) ... Tombigbee (AOG-11)
    - Chehalis (AOG-48) ... Wacissa (AOG-59)
- T1-S-C3: Armadillo-class tanker steam powered 2,500 hp, 11 knots, single propeller, 14,245 LT displacement, 441.5 ft long, 57 ft wide, 27 ft 9 in draft, Capacity: 8,500 t. Oil 63,000 bbls, crew: 81. Z-ET1-S-C3 tankers were built by California Shipbuilding in Los Angeles, California. The ET1-S-C3 tankers were built by Delta Shipbuilding in New Orleans, Louisiana. First in class USS Armadillo.
- T-AOG-81 tanker: The Alatna class small T1 tanker. Alatna-class gasoline tankers. The class is named after the first ship USNS Alatna, launched in 1956. The other ship in the class is USNS Chattahoochee. Alatna class has: diesel electric engines with two shafts, 3,200 hp, 13 knots max., displacements: 2,367 t (LT) 5,720 t (full load), Carry 30,000 bbls dimensions: 302 ft long, width 61 ft, max depth 23 ft. Crew of 51.

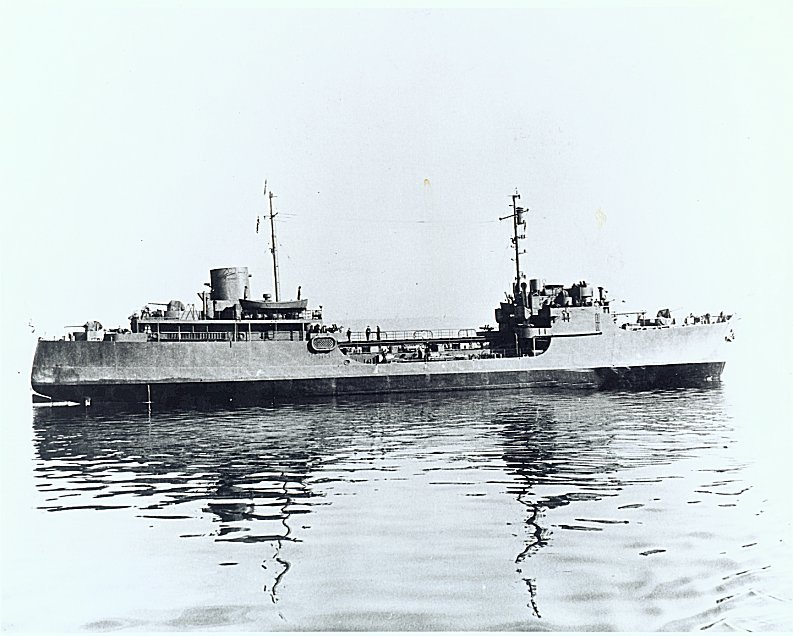
Lead ship of T1 class, T1-MT-M1, USS Patapsco, sister ship of USS Natchaug

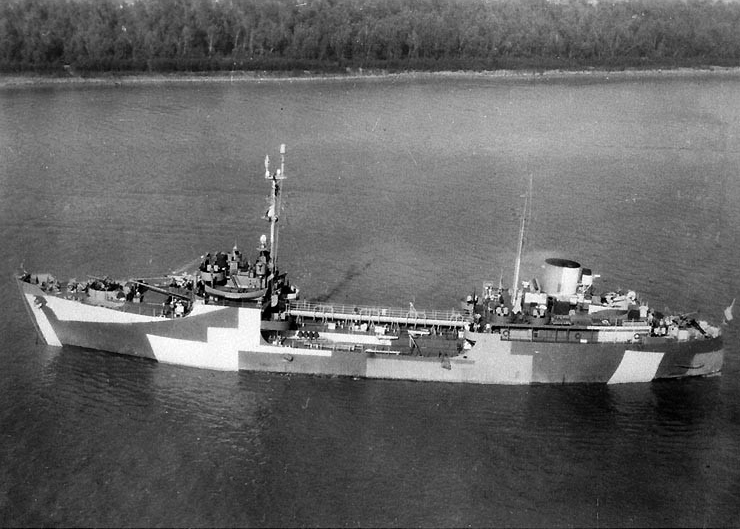
USS Chehalis a 1944 T1-MT-M1 tanker

== Other T1 type ships ==
- Eddy-class coastal tanker (1953)
- Walchensee-class tanker
- SS Empire Faun
- RFA Eddyreef
- RFA Eddyrock
- MV Ben Bates
- Panarea-class tanker
- MT Abadan
- Type 626 tanker
- MV Aqueity
- Type 631 replenishment tanker

== Notable incidents ==
- Sulphur Bluff a T1-M-A1, renamed Punta Ciguena sank on 7 February 1960 at Rio Uruguay river in Buenos Aires. She was raised, repaired and renamed Dona Isabel.
- USS Chehalis, a T1-MT-M1, exploded while in Samoa, caught fire and sank in 1949.
- USS Escatawpa, a T1-M-A2, ran aground and sank during Typhoon Louise at Kyushu, Japan, on 17 September 1945. She was raised, repaired and renamed Gravatai which sank again in 1970.
- USS Nanticoke, a T1-M-BT1, renamed ARA Punta Delgada which sank in 1985.
- Nodaway, a T1-M-BT1, renamed Dynafuel sank in a collision with SS Fernview in 1963 at Buzzards Bay, Massachusetts.
- MS Avoca, a T1-M-BT1, renamed Petaluma then MS Transpet caught fire and sank on 30 October 1951 after an explosion in the engine room in the Gulf of St. Lawrence.
- Sebasticook, a T1-M-BT1, renamed Mexia, then Kwang Lung caught fire and sank on 5 April 1961 at Kaohsiung Harbor, Taiwan. The fire-fighting party from USS Prichett help put the fire out, but she still sank, spilled a million gallons of gasoline.
- USS Tetonkaha, a T1-M-A2, was renamed Maumee Sun. Damaged in a collision with MV American Pilot in November 1965 and then scrapped. USCGC Escanaba came to her aid after the collision.
- Tarantella, a T1-M-BT2, renamed MV Esso Regulus was wrecked after running aground on Mengalum Island in the South China Sea near Malaysia. on 15 January 1976, she was later scrapped in Hong Kong.
- USS Klickitat, a T1-M-BT1, renamed Capitan was wrecked in 1948, repaired and renamed MV Punta Loyola. She was sold and renamed MV Alkene, but wrecked again in 1974 off the Philippines.

== See also ==
- T2 tanker the next size up.
- T3 Tanker the largest in the T class
- History of the oil tanker
- Victory ships
- Liberty ship
- Type C1 ship
- Type C2 ship
- Type C3 ship
- Type R ship
- United States Merchant Marine Academy
- United States Navy oiler
- Escambia-class replenishment oiler
- Eddy-class coastal tanker (1953) of Royal Navy
