= St. Johns River Shipbuilding Company =

Defunct shipyard in Jacksonville, Florida, U.S.

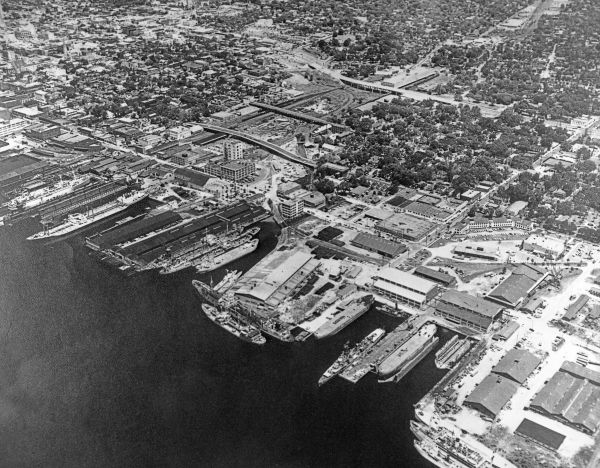
- Aerial view of St. Johns River Shipbuilding Company shipyard, 1950s
- Industry: Shipbuilding
- Founded: April 1942
- Defunct: August 1945
- Headquarters: Jacksonville, Florida, US
- Products: Liberty ships
- Number of employees: 20,000 (1944)
- Parent: Merrill-Stevens

The St. Johns River Shipbuilding Company was a shipyard created in Jacksonville, Florida, during World War II to build Liberty ships.

== Company history ==
The company was established by local shipbuilder and repairer Merrill-Stevens, with a US$17 million (equivalent to $334.98 million in 2025) invested by the United States Maritime Commission. The company began operations in April 1942, and between then and August 1945, it produced 82 ships. The workforce grew from an initial 258 to 7,000 by August 1942, and to 20,000 by 1944. The yard was closed in August 1945.

== Ships built ==
| Contract No. | Description | Price 1 | Price 2 |
|---|---|---|---|
| MCc 2427 | 30 EC2-S-C1 | $53,824,850.87 | $30,000,000 |
| MCc 16555 | 52 EC2-S-C1 | $54,973,286.20 | $52,000,000 |
| MCc 30837 | 12 T1-M-BT1 (tanker), 12 launched, 4 delivered | $12,361,347.47 | $6,000,000 |

The yard was one of those "owned outright" by the Maritime Commission, with total investment estimated at $16,145,471 plus $1,375,010 for land.

List of ships built by St. Johns River Shipbuilding Company:

- SS Richard Montgomery, Liberty ship, launched on 15 June 1943. Sunk in the Thames Estuary with explosive cargo still on board.
- SS John Philip Sousa, Liberty ship, launched on 4 July 1943
- USS Alkaid (AK-114), a Crater-class cargo ship, launched on 8 November 1943
- USS Crux (AK-115), a Crater-class cargo ship, launched on 16 November 1943
- USS Shaula (AK-118), a Crater-class cargo ship, launched on 23 November 1943
- USS Matar (AK-119), a Crater-class cargo ship, launched on 30 November 1943
- USS Baham (AG-71), a Basilan-class miscellaneous auxiliary ship, launched on 21 December 1943
- USS Menkar (AK-123), a Crater-class cargo ship, launched on 31 December 1943
- SS Edwin G. Weed, Liberty ship, launched on 29 January 1944
- USS Melucta (AK-131), a Crater-class cargo ship, launched on 20 March 1944
- SS Richard K. Call, Liberty ship, launched on 15 April 1944
- USS Naticoke (AOG-66), a T1 tanker type gasoline tanker, launched on 7 April 1945
- MS Transpet, was a tanker, launched on 5 May 1945.

Full list: shipbuildinghistory.com
