= List of shipwrecks in 1952 =

The list of shipwrecks in 1952 includes ships sunk, foundered, grounded, or otherwise lost during 1952.

table of contents
1952
| Jan | Feb | Mar | Apr |
| May | Jun | Jul | Aug |
| Sep | Oct | Nov | Dec |
Unknown date

== January ==
=== 4 January ===
List of shipwrecks: 4 January 1952
| Ship | State | Description |
|---|---|---|
| Larraiz | Spain | The 130-foot (40 m) trawler was wrecked on Cap Blanc, Western Sahara (21°45′N 17°00′W), becoming a total loss. |

=== 9 January ===
List of shipwrecks: 9 January 1952
| Ship | State | Description |
|---|---|---|
| Pennsylvania | United States | The Victory ship suffered a structural failure of her hull in the Pacific Ocean 600 nautical miles (1,100 km) north west of Cape Flattery, Washington and was abandoned. She was on a voyage from Seattle, Washington to Yokohama, Japan. Last known position 51°09′N 141°13′W. No further trace, presumed foundered; all hands lost. |
| Robin Doncaster | United States | The cargo ship collided with tug Ruth and barge Agram (both United States) in the Delaware River. Agram was damaged beyond economic repair. |

=== 10 January ===
List of shipwrecks: 10 January 1952
| Ship | State | Description |
|---|---|---|
| Flying Enterprise | United States | Flying Enterprise sinking. The cargo ship sank in English Channel, 31 nautical miles (57 km) south of The Lizard. Her cargo included $160,000 and zirconium. |

=== 12 January ===
List of shipwrecks: 12 January 1952
| Ship | State | Description |
|---|---|---|
| City of Lichfield | United Kingdom | The Liberty ship put in to Falmouth, Cornwall on fire. She was on a voyage from Liverpool, Lancashire to Beira, Mozambique. |

=== 13 January ===
List of shipwrecks: 13 January 1952
| Ship | State | Description |
|---|---|---|
| Agen | France | The cargo ship ran aground on the Goodwin Sands and broke apart. |
| Radmar | United Kingdom | Radmar at Hook of Holland The cargo ship ran aground off Hook of Holland, Netherlands. Refloated on 26 February. |
| Sovac Radiant | Panama | The tanker ran aground at South Foreland, Kent. Refloated the next day. |

=== 14 January ===
List of shipwrecks: 14 January 1952
| Ship | State | Description |
|---|---|---|
| Taxiarchis | Greece | The cargo ship ran aground at Redcar, Yorkshire, United Kingdom. All 37 crew rescued. |

=== 15 January ===
List of shipwrecks: 15 January 1952
| Ship | State | Description |
|---|---|---|
| Filadelfos | Panama | The cargo vessel ran aground, broke in two and sank at Maaloysundet. |

=== 17 January ===
List of shipwrecks: 17 January 1952
| Ship | State | Description |
|---|---|---|
| Cresset | United States | The 36-gross register ton, 53.6-foot (16.3 m) fishing vessel sank in a storm at Kodiak, Territory of Alaska. |
| Liberty | Liberia | The cargo ship ran aground at Pendeen, Cornwall, United Kingdom. Her entire crew survived. She later was scrapped. |

=== 20 January ===
List of shipwrecks: 20 January 1952
| Ship | State | Description |
|---|---|---|
| Acclivity | United Kingdom | The tanker sank off Dunstanburgh Castle, Northumberland. All seven crew rescued by the collier Magrix (United Kingdom). |

=== 22 January ===
List of shipwrecks: 22 January 1952
| Ship | State | Description |
|---|---|---|
| City of Liverpool | United Kingdom | The ocean liner ran aground at Grays Thurrock, Essex. Refloated the next day. |

=== 24 January ===
List of shipwrecks: 24 January 1952
| Ship | State | Description |
|---|---|---|
| Arahura | New Zealand | The steamer was sunk as a target in Cook Strait by Royal New Zealand Air Force aircraft. |

=== 28 January ===
List of shipwrecks: 28 January 1952
| Ship | State | Description |
|---|---|---|
| North Britain | United Kingdom | The cargo ship ran aground off Fiji. Refloated later that day. |
| Tofua | New Zealand | The cargo liner ran aground off Fiji. Refloated later that day. |

== February ==
=== 1 February ===
List of shipwrecks: 1 February 1952
| Ship | State | Description |
|---|---|---|
| Night Hawk | United States | The 16-gross register ton, 35.9-foot (10.9 m) fishing vessel was wrecked at Slate Island (55°05′45″N 131°03′00″W) in Southeast Alaska. |

=== 11 February ===
List of shipwrecks: 11 February 1952
| Ship | State | Description |
|---|---|---|
| Hans Hoth | West Germany | The coaster sank in the North Sea 15 nautical miles (28 km) off the mouth of the Tyne. All nine crew saved by the tug Hendon (United Kingdom). |
| Marjory | Panama | The 2323-gross register ton cargo ship went ashore on the Hinder or Maasvlakte Bank, south of the Hook of Holland, on a voyage from A Coruña to Rotterdam with iron ore, and was abandoned when she began leaking. The wreck was later refloated and taken to Amsterdam for breaking up in May 1952. |

=== 12 February ===
List of shipwrecks: 12 February 1952
| Ship | State | Description |
|---|---|---|
| Davey Lynn | United States | The 7-gross register ton, 32.3-foot (9.8 m) fishing vessel was wrecked on Egg Island (57°57′N 152°47′W) off of Whale Island Point in Marmot Bay (58.0358333°N 152.3486111°W) in Alaska's Kodiak Archipelago. |

=== 13 February ===
List of shipwrecks: 13 February 1952
| Ship | State | Description |
|---|---|---|
| Paolina | United States | The 60.39-gross register ton, 32.3-foot (9.8 m) fishing vessel was lost in the vicinity of Nantucket Lightship (United States) in the Atlantic Ocean off the coast of Massachusetts. Paolina was last heard from by radio at about 7:00 P.M. on 12 February 1952. At that time it was established vessel had on board about 30,000 pounds of mixed fish and was about 32 miles (51 km) south-southwest of Nantucket Lightship and was planning to head for New Bedford, Massachusetts at midnight to arrive on 13 February to make the 14 February fish market. The U.S. Coast Guard was first notified at 9:15 A.M. on 15 February that Paolina was overdue. An extensive U.S.Coast Guard surface and air search took place until abandoned on the morning of 18 February, due to a bad northeast storm, the improbability of Paolina being afloat, and the need for the services of Coast Guard resources in connection with the then-ongoing operations off Chatham, Massachusetts involving the tankers Fort Mercer and Pendleton. |

=== 15 February ===
List of shipwrecks: 15 February 1952
| Ship | State | Description |
|---|---|---|
| Kerry | United States | The 11-gross register ton, 33.5-foot (10.2 m) fishing vessel was wrecked on the coast of Afognak Island in the Territory of Alaska's Kodiak Archipelago. |

=== 18 February ===
List of shipwrecks: 18 February 1952
| Ship | State | Description |
|---|---|---|
| Helen Stevenson | United States | The Liberty ship developed cracks in her deck 230 nautical miles (430 km) north west of Bermuda. She was on a voyage from Trieste, Italy to New York. She was escorted in to Hamilton, Bermuda by USCGC Dexter ( United States Coast Guard) on 21 February. |
| Pendleton | United States | Pendleton sinking, 19 February 1952 Carrying a cargo of fuel oil, the Type T2-SE-A1 tanker broke in two in the Atlantic Ocean off the coast of Massachusetts. The stern section grounded 6 nautical miles (11 km; 6.9 mi) off Chatham, Massachusetts, and later sank in 25 feet (7.6 m) of water 1 nautical mile (1.9 km; 1.2 mi) east of Monomoy Island at 41°35′10″N 069°57′45″W. Her bow section either sank or ran aground on a nearby reef and later was salvaged and rebuilt, according to different sources. Thirty-two of her 41 crew were rescued by the motor lifeboat CG 36500 ( United States Coast Guard). Her other nine crew members perished. |
| Fort Mercer | United States | Bow section of Fort Mercer sinking. The T2-SE-A1 tanker broke in two off Chatham, Massachusetts. Twenty-one of her 34 crew were rescued from the stern section by the icebreaker USCGC Eastwind ( United States Coast Guard). Four crew were rescued from the bow section by the cutter USCGC Yakutat ( United States Coast Guard). |

=== 19 February ===
List of shipwrecks: 19 February 1952
| Ship | State | Description |
|---|---|---|
| Arkaba | Unknown flag | The cargo ship was stranded on a reef off Port Lincoln, South Australia. She was later refloated and returned to service. |

=== 25 February ===
List of shipwrecks: 19 February 1952
| Ship | State | Description |
|---|---|---|
| Elanor | Unknown flag | The barge was sunk in the River Mersey, England, in a collision with the passenger ship Tynwald (Isle of Man). |

== March ==
=== 3 March ===
List of shipwrecks: 3 March 1952
| Ship | State | Description |
|---|---|---|
| Rachel Jackson | United States | The Liberty ship was damaged in the Atlantic Ocean 300 nautical miles (560 km) north west of Bermuda. Four ships went to her aid. She was on a voyage from Norfolk, Virginia to a European port. |

=== 12 March ===
List of shipwrecks: 12 March 1952
| Ship | State | Description |
|---|---|---|
| Caronia | United Kingdom | The passenger ship ran aground in the Suez Canal in Egypt. |

=== 21 March ===
List of shipwrecks: 21 March 1952
| Ship | State | Description |
|---|---|---|
| Lepar | Netherlands | The Design 381 cargo ship burned off Djambi after an explosion. |

=== 22 March ===
List of shipwrecks: 22 March 1952
| Ship | State | Description |
|---|---|---|
| Leok | Netherlands | The Design 381 class cargo ship caught fire, burned in the River Siak near Pakan Baru. |

== April ==
=== 3 April ===
List of shipwrecks: 3 April 1952
| Ship | State | Description |
|---|---|---|
| RFA Wave Ruler | Royal Navy | The Wave-class oiler caught fire at Greenock, Scotland. Later repaired and returned to service. |

=== 5 April ===
List of shipwrecks: 5 April 1952
| Ship | State | Description |
|---|---|---|
| Alfios | Greece | The Liberty ship struck the wreck of Kontum ( (France) French Indochina) off Saigon, French Indochina. She ran aground, broke in two and sank (10°20′N 107°03′E). |
| Brattind, Buskøy, Pels, Ringsel and Vårglimt | all Norway | The vessels sank in a storm in the West Ice, Greenland. A total of 78 lives were lost. |

=== 13 April ===
List of shipwrecks: 13 April 1952
| Ship | State | Description |
|---|---|---|
| William Eaton | United States | The Liberty ship was driven ashore near Toshima, Japan (34°34′N 139°15′E). She was on a voyage from Otaru, Japan to Pusan, South Korea. She broke in two on 26 April and was a total loss. |

=== 23 April ===
List of shipwrecks: 23 April 1952
| Ship | State | Description |
|---|---|---|
| Holdernile | United Kingdom | Collided in the River Scheldt near Fort St Marie, Belgium with Meerkerk (Netherlands) and sank. |

=== 26 April ===
List of shipwrecks: 26 April 1952
| Ship | State | Description |
|---|---|---|
| USS Hobson | United States Navy | The Gleaves-class destroyer collided in the Atlantic Ocean with the aircraft carrier USS Wasp (United States Navy) and sank with the loss of 176 lives. |

=== Unknown date ===
List of shipwrecks: Unknown date 1952
| Ship | State | Description |
|---|---|---|
| Flying Buzzard | United Kingdom | The tug was towing Esso Appalachee (United Kingdom) with Flying Petrel (United Kingdom) when Esso Appalachee fouled her tow and then collided with Flying Buzzard, sinking her. She was salvaged in May and repaired, returning to service in October. |
| Beltana | Australia | The cargo ship ran aground in Port Philip Bay, Victoria, Australia. Refloated on 7 May. |

== May ==
=== 4 May ===
List of shipwrecks: 4 May 1952
| Ship | State | Description |
|---|---|---|
| Heathery Brae | United Kingdom | The 86-foot (26 m), 90-ton salvage vessel was engaged in salvage work over the wreck of Clarrie (United Kingdom), wrecked in 1921, off Bordeaux harbour, Guernsey Channel Islands. Timed explosive charges were placed on the wreck but she could not move clear in time and was severely damaged by the explosion. She launched her lifeboat and the four crew pulled clear before the vessel foundered. |

=== 7 May ===
List of shipwrecks: 7 May 1952
| Ship | State | Description |
|---|---|---|
| Orcades | United Kingdom | The ocean liner ran aground in Port Philip Bay, Victoria, Australia. |
| Rio Santa Cruz | Argentina | The passenger-cargo ship suffered major boiler explosion at sea off Cabo Blanco, between Puerto Deseado and Comodoro Rivadavia, Argentina, with loss of six lives; the ship was laid up and later scrapped. |

=== 8 May ===
List of shipwrecks: 8 May 1952
| Ship | State | Description |
|---|---|---|
| HMS Tenacious | Royal Navy | The T-class destroyer ran aground in the River Foyle, Northern Ireland. |

=== 10 May ===
List of shipwrecks: 10 May 1952
| Ship | State | Description |
|---|---|---|
| Chervona Ukraina | Soviet Navy | The decommissioned Admiral Nakhimov-class light cruiser was grounded on a spit for use as a target. By 1980, nothing remained of the ship above the water's surface. |
| Laughing Lady | United States | The 10-gross register ton, 33-foot (10.1 m) fishing vessel was destroyed by fire at Latouche (60°03′05″N 147°54′00″W) in the Territory of Alaska. |

=== 11 May ===
List of shipwrecks: 11 May 1952
| Ship | State | Description |
|---|---|---|
| Marion | United States | The 14-gross register ton, 49.5-foot (15.1 m) fishing vessel was destroyed by fire on the south-central coast of the Territory of Alaska, 3 nautical miles (5.6 km; 3.5 mi) west of the mouth of the Kaliakh River (60°05′40″N 142°48′30″W). |

=== 12 May ===
List of shipwrecks: 12 May 1952
| Ship | State | Description |
|---|---|---|
| Rouen | France | The Liberty ship ran aground at Los Vilos, Chile. She was refloated and towed in to Valparaíso. |

=== 15 May ===
List of shipwrecks: 15 May 1952
| Ship | State | Description |
|---|---|---|
| Angelina, Barbara Lykes and F. L. Heyes | United States | The steamship Barbara Lykes collided with the tanker F. L. Heyes in the Chesapeake and Delaware Canal. Some of the tanker's cargo of petrol spilled and caught fire, damaging Angelina. |

=== 20 May ===
List of shipwrecks: 20 May 1952
| Ship | State | Description |
|---|---|---|
| Estrella | United States | The 7-gross register ton, 38.8-foot (11.8 m) motor vessel was destroyed by fire at Clover Pass (55°28′20″N 131°47′30″W) in Southeast Alaska. |

=== 21 May ===
List of shipwrecks: 21 May 1952
| Ship | State | Description |
|---|---|---|
| Nathaniel B. Palmer | United States | The Liberty ship ran aground in the Martin Garcia Channel. She was later refloated. Although declared a constructive total loss, she was repaired and returned to service. |

=== 30 May ===
List of shipwrecks: 30 May 1952
| Ship | State | Description |
|---|---|---|
| Halesius | United Kingdom | The cargo ship ran aground 25 nautical miles (46 km) from Cape Ténès, Algeria. She was on a voyage from San Pedro de Macorís, Dominican Republic to Colombo, Ceylon. She was refloated but was laid up and later sold. |

== June ==
=== 3 June ===
List of shipwrecks: 3 June 1952
| Ship | State | Description |
|---|---|---|
| Inger Skou | Denmark | The Hansa A Type cargo ship ran aground on the Chinchorro Bank, off the coast of British Honduras and sank. She was on a voyage from New Orleans, Louisiana, United States to Belize City, British Honduras. |
| Perseusz | Poland | The 140.3-foot (42.8 m), 352-ton trawler was lost when she struck a submerged wreck and sank, or stranded, off Świnoujście, Poland (54°01′N 14°20′E). |

=== 5 June ===
List of shipwrecks: 5 June 1952
| Ship | State | Description |
|---|---|---|
| HMML 2582 | Royal Navy | Exercise Bluebird: A Royal Netherlands Air Force Republic F-84 Thunderjet aircraft collided with the motor launch's mast and crashed onto the boat, killing its pilot and fifteen crew of 2582, which sank. The accident occurred in the Marsdiep, Netherlands. |

=== 27 June ===
List of shipwrecks: 27 June 1952
| Ship | State | Description |
|---|---|---|
| Alasco | United States | The 22-gross register ton, 44-foot (13.4 m) fishing vessel sank near Cordova, Territory of Alaska. |
| Othon | Greece | The Liberty ship ran aground off Karachi, Pakistan, broke in two and sank. |

=== 30 June ===
List of shipwrecks: 30 June 1952
| Ship | State | Description |
|---|---|---|
| Mahenge | Belgium | The Victory ship collided with Liberty ship Granville (France) off Alderney, Channel Islands (49°48′N 2°18′W). Mahenge sank, her 46 crew and three passengers were rescued by Ringas (Norway). Granville was severely damaged and set on fire. Later towed to Cherbourg, France after the fire was extinguished. |

== July ==
=== 6 July ===
List of shipwrecks: 6 July 1952
| Ship | State | Description |
|---|---|---|
| Whiteson | United Kingdom | The cargo ship sank northeast of the Paracel Islands, China. |

=== 10 July ===
List of shipwrecks: 10 July 1952
| Ship | State | Description |
|---|---|---|
| Prins Alexander | Netherlands | The ship collided with the Liberty ship N. O. Rogenaes in the English Channel. Prins Alexander was towed in to Dover, Kent, United Kingdom. |
| Solar | United States | The 36-gross register ton, 43.7-foot (13.3 m) fishing vessel was wrecked in Oil Bay (59°38′N 153°17′W) in Cook Inlet on the south-central coast of Alaska. |

=== 12 July ===
List of shipwrecks: 12 July 1952
| Ship | State | Description |
|---|---|---|
| Lompoc, and Victor H. Kelly | United States | The tanker Victor H. Kelly caught fire at Oleum, California and exploded, setting fire to the T2 tanker Lompoc. Victory H. Kelly consequently sank. Lompoc was later repaired and returned to service. Victor H. Kelly was declared a constructive total loss, but was sold and converted to a bulk carrier, returning to service as Spruce Woods. |

=== 14 July ===
List of shipwrecks: 14 July 1952
| Ship | State | Description |
|---|---|---|
| Empire Marshal | United Kingdom | The heavy lift ship was severely damaged by an explosion in her engine room at Pusan, Korea. She was declared a constructive total loss, but was repaired using the engines from the tanker Elax (United Kingdom), which was scrapped. Returned to service as Bermuda Trader under the Hong Kong flag. |

=== 22 July ===
List of shipwrecks: 22 July 1952
| Ship | State | Description |
|---|---|---|
| Iola | United States | The 11-gross register ton, 33.4-foot (10.2 m) fishing vessel was destroyed by fire at 53°44′N 167°00′W, near Near Island in the Territory of Alaska's Kodiak Archipelago. |
| Portland | Denmark | The tanker sank in the Kattegat with the loss of seventeen crew. |
| Wizard | United States | The 60-gross register ton, 65.6-foot (20.0 m) fishing vessel was wrecked on Fossil Beach between Narrow Cape and Pasagshak Beach in Uyak Bay on Kodiak Island in the Territory of Alaska's Kodiak Archipelago. She later was refloated, but her deck gave way while she was under tow to Kodiak and she sank near the outer buoy of Womens Bay. |

=== 25 July ===
List of shipwrecks: 25 July 1952
| Ship | State | Description |
|---|---|---|
| Hercules | United States | The 80-gross register ton, 72-foot (21.9 m) scow sank off Perl Island in Cook Inlet on the south-central coast of the Territory of Alaska. |

=== Unknown date ===
List of shipwrecks: Unknown date 1952
| Ship | State | Description |
|---|---|---|
| Prins Alexander | Netherlands | The cargo ship collided with N O Rogenaes (Norway), Strait of Dover. Towed into Dover. |

== August ==
=== 1 August ===
List of shipwrecks: 1 August 1952
| Ship | State | Description |
|---|---|---|
| Pas de Calais II | France | The dredger sank in Boulogne Harbour after dredging up a torpedo, which exploded. Eleven crew were killed. |
| Sundown | United States | The 270-gross register ton, 107.6-foot (32.8 m) motor cargo vessel was wrecked on Akun Island in the Fox Islands in the eastern Aleutian Islands. |

=== 3 August ===
List of shipwrecks: 3 August 1952
| Ship | State | Description |
|---|---|---|
| Pawik | United States | The 18-gross register ton, 42.7-foot (13.0 m) fishing vessel sank near Bear River (56°10′N 163°38′W) above Port Moller, Territory of Alaska. |

=== 5 August ===
List of shipwrecks: 5 August 1952
| Ship | State | Description |
|---|---|---|
| Alice T | United States | The 131-gross register ton, 107.5-foot (32.8 m) fishing vessel was wrecked on the northwest corner of Perl Island in Chugach Passage (59°09.99′N 151°46.53′W) on the south-central coast of the Territory of Alaska. |

=== 6 August ===
List of shipwrecks: 6 August 1952
| Ship | State | Description |
|---|---|---|
| HDMS Y 340 | Royal Danish Navy | The cutter collided with the ferry Broen (Denmark) and sank in the Nyborg Fjord. Later salvaged, repaired, and returned to service. |

=== 8 August ===
List of shipwrecks: 8 August 1952
| Ship | State | Description |
|---|---|---|
| Ariana | Finland | The cargo ship ran aground in the Scheldt, Belgium and broke in two. |

=== 10 August ===
List of shipwrecks: 10 August 1952
| Ship | State | Description |
|---|---|---|
| Lassei | United Kingdom | The cargo ship ran aground off Cloughey Bay, Northern Ireland. Refloated on 2 September. |

=== 15 August ===
List of shipwrecks: 15 August 1952
| Ship | State | Description |
|---|---|---|
| Florence S | United States | The 37-gross register ton, 75-foot (22.9 m) barge sank in the Yukon River near Galena, Territory of Alaska. |

=== 17 August ===
List of shipwrecks: 17 August 1952
| Ship | State | Description |
|---|---|---|
| Evgenia Chandris | Greece | The Liberty ship ran aground in the Aleutian Islands, Alaska, United States. She was later refloated and taken into Victoria, British Columbia, Canada. Although declared a constructive total loss, she was repaired and returned to service. |

=== 20 August ===
List of shipwrecks: 20 August 1952
| Ship | State | Description |
|---|---|---|
| Magnolia | United Kingdom | The 125.3-foot (38.2 m), 259.76-ton fishing trawler sprung a leak in heavy swells 45 miles (72 km) northeast of the Spurn Lightship on 19 August. She was later taken under tow by the trawler Rose of England (United Kingdom). Nineteen hours later on 20 August she suddenly foundered with the loss of three of her crew. Survivors were rescued by Rose of England. |
| Western Farmer | United States | The Liberty ship collided with the tanker Bjorgholm (Norway) near the Goodwin Sands, Kent, United Kingdom and broke in two. Her crew were rescued by the Dover and Ramsgate lifeboats. |

=== 28 August ===
List of shipwrecks: 28 August 1952
| Ship | State | Description |
|---|---|---|
| USS Sarsi | United States Navy | Korean War: The Abnaki-class fleet ocean tug struck a naval mine and sank off the coast of North Korea between Wonsan and Hungnam. Four crewmen were killed and four wounded. Survivors were rescued by the destroyer USS Boyd and the minesweepers USS Zeal and USS Competent (all United States Navy). |

=== Unknown date ===
List of shipwrecks: Unknown date 1952
| Ship | State | Description |
|---|---|---|
| Cha-194 | Japan | The No.1-class auxiliary submarine chaser ran aground near Sakata and was abandoned as a total loss. |

== September ==
=== 1 September ===
List of shipwrecks: 1 September 1952
| Ship | State | Description |
|---|---|---|
| Derwentfield | United Kingdom | The tanker suffered an explosion and fire at Balik Papan, Borneo, Indonesia. She was abandoned on 16 September and declared a constructive total loss. |

=== 4 September ===
List of shipwrecks: 4 September 1952
| Ship | State | Description |
|---|---|---|
| Stream Fisher | United Kingdom | The coaster sank at Swansea, Glamorgan whilst being loaded. |

=== 5 September ===
List of shipwrecks: 5 September 1952
| Ship | State | Description |
|---|---|---|
| Foundation Star | Honduras | The tanker broke in two of Cape Hatteras in a storm. |
| John Randolph | United States | The bow section of the Liberty ship, a former United States Navy hulk, was driven ashore and wrecked in Torrisdale Bay, Argyllshire, United Kingdom. It had been under tow from Reykjavík, Iceland to Faslane, Argyllshire for scrapping. |

=== 7 September ===
List of shipwrecks: 7 September 1952
| Ship | State | Description |
|---|---|---|
| Princess Kathleen | Canada | Princess Kathleen sinking. During a voyage from Juneau to Skagway, Territory of Alaska, the 5,875-ton, 369-foot (112.5 m) passenger-cargo ship ran aground at Lena Point (58°23′45″N 134°46′45″W) in Lynn Canal in Southeast Alaska. After all 425 passengers and crew abandoned ship in her lifeboats and reached shore, she slid off Lena Point and sank in 120 feet (36.6 m) of water. |
| "Phyllisia" | South African Navy | The 148-foot (45 m) steam fishing trawler was stripped of all useful parts, then used as a target and scuttled off Robben Island. |

=== 9 September ===
List of shipwrecks: 9 September 1952
| Ship | State | Description |
|---|---|---|
| Niš | Yugoslavia | The ferry capsized and sank in the Danube at Belgrade, Yugoslavia. Ninety people drowned. |

=== 15 September ===
List of shipwrecks: 15 September 1952
| Ship | State | Description |
|---|---|---|
| Neverita | United Kingdom | The tanker suffered an explosion in her engine room off Cape York, Queensland, Australia. She was towed in to Townsville, Queensland on 1 October by the tug Carlock (Australia). |

=== 19 September ===
List of shipwrecks: 19 September 1952
| Ship | State | Description |
|---|---|---|
| Doris | United States | The 7-gross register ton, 32.5-foot (9.9 m) fishing vessel was destroyed by fire in Southeast Alaska halfway between Neva Strait (57.3141°N 135.6474°W) and Olga Strait (57.2028°N 135.4819°W). |

=== 22 September ===
List of shipwrecks: 22 September 1952
| Ship | State | Description |
|---|---|---|
| Unknown minelayer | Korean People's Army Naval Force | Korean War: The minelayer was captured by HMCS Nootka (Royal Canadian Navy) in the Taedong River estuary and was scuttled. Five crewmen were captured. |

=== 23 September ===
List of shipwrecks: 23 September 1952
| Ship | State | Description |
|---|---|---|
| Joacosta | Portugal | The three-masted sailing trawler sank in the Atlantic 56 nautical miles (104 km) north of Saõ Miguel Island, Azores. Twelve crew were rescued by Compass (United States). Thirty five were rescued by Steel Executive (United States) and the remaining 27 were rescued by Henriette Schulee (West Germany). |

=== 24 September ===
List of shipwrecks: 24 September 1952
| Ship | State | Description |
|---|---|---|
| Kaiyō No. 5 | Japan | The oceanographic research ship was sunk by jets of water and tephra from the eruption of the submarine volcano Myōjin-shō. |
| S S F Co No 5 | United States | The 126-gross register ton, 70-foot (21 m) scow sank off Narrow Point (55°47′30″N 132°28′30″W) in Clarence Strait in the Alexander Archipelago in Southeast Alaska. |

=== 25 September ===
List of shipwrecks: 25 September 1952
| Ship | State | Description |
|---|---|---|
| Western | United States | The 9-gross register ton, 30.3-foot (9.2 m) fishing vessel was destroyed by fire in Canoe Passage at the south end of Etolin Island in the Alexander Archipelago in Southeast Alaska. |

=== 28 September ===
List of shipwrecks: 28 September 1952
| Ship | State | Description |
|---|---|---|
| Sibylle | French Navy | The S-class submarine sank in the Mediterranean off Cape Camarat with the loss of all hands. |

=== 29 September ===
List of shipwrecks: 29 September 1952
| Ship | State | Description |
|---|---|---|
| Crusader | United Kingdom | Piloted on Loch Ness in Scotland by John Cobb in an attempt to set a new world water speed record, the jet-powered speedboat struck a wake at an estimated speed of 210 miles per hour (340 km/h) and disintegrated, killing Cobb, whose body was thrown 50 yards (46 m). The boat′s wreckage was discovered on 5 July 2002 on the bottom of Loch Ness at a depth of 200 metres (656 ft). |

=== 30 September ===
List of shipwrecks: 30 September 1952
| Ship | State | Description |
|---|---|---|
| HMS Wave | Royal Navy | The Algerine-class minesweeper ran aground at St. Ives. All crew saved. Ship later refloated and towed to Devonport. |

=== Unknown date ===
List of shipwrecks: Unknown date 1952
| Ship | State | Description |
|---|---|---|
| Foundation Star | Honduras | The tanker broke in two whilst on a voyage from Veracruz to Philadelphia, Pennsylvania, United States. Both sections sank. |
| No. 26 Olbbaemi | Republic of Korea Navy | Korean War: The Galmaegi-class motor torpedo boat – an Elco 80-foot (24.4 m) PT boat – was lost. |

== October ==
=== 1 October ===
List of shipwrecks: 1 October 1952
| Ship | State | Description |
|---|---|---|
| Baron Dunmore | United Kingdom | The cargo ship ran aground at Workington, Cumberland and broke her back. |

=== 2 October ===
List of shipwrecks: 2 October 1952
| Ship | State | Description |
|---|---|---|
| Luctor | Netherlands | The cargo ship capsized and sank off Guernsey, Channel Islands with the loss of three of her seven crew. |

=== 3 October ===
List of shipwrecks: 3 October 1952
| Ship | State | Description |
|---|---|---|
| HMS Plym | Royal Navy | The atomic explosion that destroyed HMS Plym. Operation Hurricane: The decommissioned frigate was obliterated by an atomic bomb detonated inside her hull in a nuclear test 350 metres (383 yards) off Trimouille Island in the lagoon in the Monte Bello Islands in Western Australia. |

=== 4 October ===
List of shipwrecks: 4 October 1952
| Ship | State | Description |
|---|---|---|
| Norman | United Kingdom | The steam trawler was wrecked on skerries east of Cape Farewell, southern Greenland with only one survivor from a crew of 21. |

=== 5 October ===
List of shipwrecks: 5 October 1952
| Ship | State | Description |
|---|---|---|
| Braconlea | United Kingdom | The 115.5-foot (35.2 m), 200-ton trawler foundered 170 miles (270 km) south of Iceland. Five crew were killed while the survivors were rescued by an Icelandic trawler. |

=== 8 October ===
List of shipwrecks: 8 October 1952
| Ship | State | Description |
|---|---|---|
| Heemskerk | Netherlands | The cargo ship ran aground at Osthammar, Sweden and was damaged. Later refloated and towed into Oregrund. |

=== 11 October ===
List of shipwrecks: 11 October 1952
| Ship | State | Description |
|---|---|---|
| Three unidentified motor torpedo boats | (China) People's Liberation Army Navy | Chinese Civil War: Battle of Nanri Island: Three motor torpedo boats were sunk by coastal artillery. |
| Three unidentified junks | (China) People's Liberation Army Navy | Chinese Civil War: Battle of Nanri Island: Three junks were sunk by coastal artillery. |

=== 18 October ===
List of shipwrecks: 18 October 1952
| Ship | State | Description |
|---|---|---|
| Timberman | United States | The 53-gross register ton, 61.1-foot (18.6 m) tug was wrecked at Caamano Point (55°30′N 131°58′W) in Southeast Alaska. |

=== 23 October ===
List of shipwrecks: 23 October 1952
| Ship | State | Description |
|---|---|---|
| Loch Lomond | United Kingdom | The 131-foot (40 m), 310-ton trawler bottomed in the harbour in heavy swells at Aberdeen damaging her rudder. She was then swept onto the apron of the North Pier and wrecked. She was declared a total loss and broken up in place. |
| Wyre Law | United Kingdom | The 135.2-foot (41.2 m), 313-ton trawler was stranded in Broad Bay, Isle of Lewis. Crew taken off by "Charlie Daran" (United Kingdom). Salvage was going to be attempted, but within a week severe weather caused her to settle and salvage was abandoned. |

== November ==
=== 4 November ===
List of shipwrecks: 4 November 1952
| Ship | State | Description |
|---|---|---|
| Aslett | Flag unknown | The motor yacht caught fire in the Mediterranean Sea. Four people were rescued by Kypros (United Kingdom). |

=== 5 November ===
List of shipwrecks: 5 November 1952
| Ship | State | Description |
|---|---|---|
| Ann | United States | The 17-gross register ton, 37.4-foot (11.4 m) fishing vessel was destroyed by fire while moored at Latouche Island (60°03′05″N 147°54′00″W) in the Gulf of Alaska off the south-central coast of the Territory of Alaska. |

=== 6 November ===
List of shipwrecks: 6 November 1952
| Ship | State | Description |
|---|---|---|
| Antioche II | France | The out of service trawler, a sold off Castle-class trawler, while being towed to the breakers yard, broke loose and stranded on the Isle D'Quessant. Scrapped in place. |
| Faustus | Panama | Faustus The cargo ship ran aground north of Hook of Holland, South Holland, Netherlands. Her 26 crew were rescued by Jan Lels (Netherlands). Faustus was driven through the breakwater and sank the following day. She was on a voyage from the Hampton Roads, Virginia, United States to Rotterdam, South Holland. |
| Bakir | Turkey | The cargo ship ran aground off Ameland, Netherlands. |
| Sac Badalone | Spain | The cargo ship ran aground off the Wadden Islands, Netherlands. |

=== 18 November ===
List of shipwrecks: 18 November 1952
| Ship | State | Description |
|---|---|---|
| Home | Canada | The steamship was stranded at Jersey Harbour after breaking her moorings. |

=== 21 November ===
List of shipwrecks: 21 November 1952
| Ship | State | Description |
|---|---|---|
| Krasnyi Kavkaz | Soviet Navy | The decommissioned cruiser was sunk as a target by SS-N-1 Scrubber anti-ship cruise missiles. |

=== 24 November ===
List of shipwrecks: 24 November 1952
| Ship | State | Description |
|---|---|---|
| Denny Jo | United States | The 38-gross register ton, 50-foot (15.2 m) fishing vessel sank in Stag Bay (57°35′45″N 136°21′30″W) on Lisianski Strait (57°35′45″N 136°21′30″W) near Cape Spencer in Southeast Alaska. |

=== Unknown date ===
List of shipwrecks: Unknown date 1952
| Ship | State | Description |
|---|---|---|
| Adrias II | Greece | The ship ran aground at Falconera Islet whilst on a voyage from Crete to Piraeus. |
| Aslett | Flag unknown | The motor yacht caught fire and sank in the Mediterranean Sea. Four people were rescued by Kypros (United Kingdom). |
| Brunswick | United Kingdom | The tug was involved in a collision with another vessel and sank in the River Mersey with the loss of three crew. Raised on 17 November and beached near Liverpool, Lancashire. |

== December ==
=== 3 December ===
List of shipwrecks: 3 December 1952
| Ship | State | Description |
|---|---|---|
| Euroland | West Germany | The tanker struck a mine and sank in the North Sea, north of Terschelling, Netherlands (53°33′N 5°15′E). |
| HDMS Havørnen | Royal Danish Navy | The gunboat ran aground on Scroby Sands, Norfolk, United Kingdom. She was refloated on 17 December. Subsequently repaired and returned to service. |

=== 10 December ===
List of shipwrecks: 10 December 1952
| Ship | State | Description |
|---|---|---|
| Ellen | West Germany | The coastal tanker collided with the ocean liner Maasdam (Netherlands) in the Nieuwe Waterweg, Netherlands. She capsized and sank with the loss of six of the twelve people on board. |

=== 11 December ===
List of shipwrecks: 11 December 1952
| Ship | State | Description |
|---|---|---|
| Fernstream | Norway | The cargo liner collided with Hawaiian Rancher (United States) and sank near the Golden Gate Bridge, San Francisco, California, United States. All 42 crew and twelve passengers were rescued. |

=== 15 December ===
List of shipwrecks: 15 December 1952
| Ship | State | Description |
|---|---|---|
| USNS Grommet Reefer | United States Navy | The stores ship an aground at Livorno, Italy, a total loss. |
| Shch-117 | Soviet Navy | The Shchuka-class submarine was lost in the Strait of Tartary on or about this date. All 52 crew members lost. |

=== 17 December ===
List of shipwrecks: 17 December 1952
| Ship | State | Description |
|---|---|---|
| Quartette | United States | The Liberty ship ran aground on the Pearl & Hermes Reef, in the Pacific Ocean 90 nautical miles (170 km) east of Midway Atoll and broke in two, a total loss. |

=== 18 December ===
List of shipwrecks: 18 December 1952
| Ship | State | Description |
|---|---|---|
| Wafico No. 2 | United States | The 7-gross register ton, 30.6-foot (9.3 m) fishing vessel was lost in Monashka Bay in the Territory of Alaska. |

=== 21 December ===
List of shipwrecks: 21 December 1952
| Ship | State | Description |
|---|---|---|
| Melanie Schulte | West Germany | The cargo ship sank in the Atlantic Ocean in heavy weather. She last made radio contact at (58°22′N 9°33′W). Lost with all 35 hands. |
| Quartette | United States | Wreckage of SS Quartette on 1 September 2007. The Liberty ship ran aground on a reef at Pearl and Hermes Atoll in the Northwestern Hawaiian Islands. Thirty-five crew were rescued the next day by Frontenac Victory (United States). Quartette broke in two in January 1953 and was declared a total loss. |

=== 22 December ===
List of shipwrecks: 22 December 1952
| Ship | State | Description |
|---|---|---|
| Champollion | France | The ocean liner ran aground at Ouzai Bay, Beirut, Lebanon and was wrecked. Seventeen people were killed. |
| Margarita | Finland | The cargo ship ran aground on Ailsa Craig, Firth of Clyde, United Kingdom. Refloated on 29 December. |

=== 23 December ===
List of shipwrecks: 23 December 1952
| Ship | State | Description |
|---|---|---|
| Albatros | Netherlands | The cargo ship ran aground at St Catherine's Point, Isle of Wight and was wrecked. |
| Oswestry Grange | United Kingdom | The cargo ship ran aground in the Nieuwe Waterweg, Netherlands. |

=== 24 December ===
List of shipwrecks: 24 December 1952
| Ship | State | Description |
|---|---|---|
| Virginia | Panama | The cargo ship ran aground off Atherfield, Isle of Wight, United Kingdom. Refloated on 23 January 1953, but declared a constructive total loss and subsequently scrapped. |

=== 27 December ===
List of shipwrecks: 27 December 1952
| Ship | State | Description |
|---|---|---|
| Merino | Australia | The 550-ton interstate cargo ship, owned by L. W. Smith Pty. Ltd., Launceston, ran aground in Wineglass Bay, Swansea, Tasmania, Australia. |

=== 28 December ===
List of shipwrecks: 28 December 1952
| Ship | State | Description |
|---|---|---|
| Emory Victory | United States | The Victory ship ran aground at Cairnryan, Wigtownshire, United Kingdom. She was refloated later that day. |

=== 29 December ===
List of shipwrecks: 29 December 1952
| Ship | State | Description |
|---|---|---|
| City of New York | United States | The barque ran aground at Yarmouth, Nova Scotia, Canada and was subsequently destroyed by fire. |
| Fermain | United Kingdom | Whilst on a voyage from Swansea to Guernsey with Anthracite, the cargo ship ran aground on Black Rock off St Sampson's, Guernsey, Channel Islands. Declared a constructive loss. |

== Unknown date ==
List of shipwrecks: Unknown date 1952
| Ship | State | Description |
|---|---|---|
| Buskø | Norway | The sealer sank with the loss of 79 lives. |
| Leok | Malaysia | The Design 381 coastal freighter was sunk when her cargo exploded at Pakan Baroe sometime in 1952. |
| Lepar | Malaysia | The Design 381 coastal freighter burned at Djambi, Malaysia sometime in 1952. |
| Levant II | Malta | The decommissioned cable ship was on her way to be scuttled when she began to take on water and sank off Grand Harbour, Malta. |
| N. Eberling | West Germany | The trawler was reported in trouble off the west coast of Iceland on 23 December and went missing. |
| Southern Collins | United Kingdom | The tanker ran aground on the coast of Scotland at the entrance to Leith harbour and was holed. She later was repaired and returned to service |
