= Arkaba =

Arkaba may refer to:

- Arkaba Creek, a watercourse in South Australia
- Arkaba Station, a sheep station in South Australia
- Hundred of Arkaba, a cadastral unit in South Australia
- SS Arkaba (1924), a ship
- The Arkaba Projects, a collection of building projects in South Australia
