= American Petroleum Transport Corporation =

Former US Shipping Company

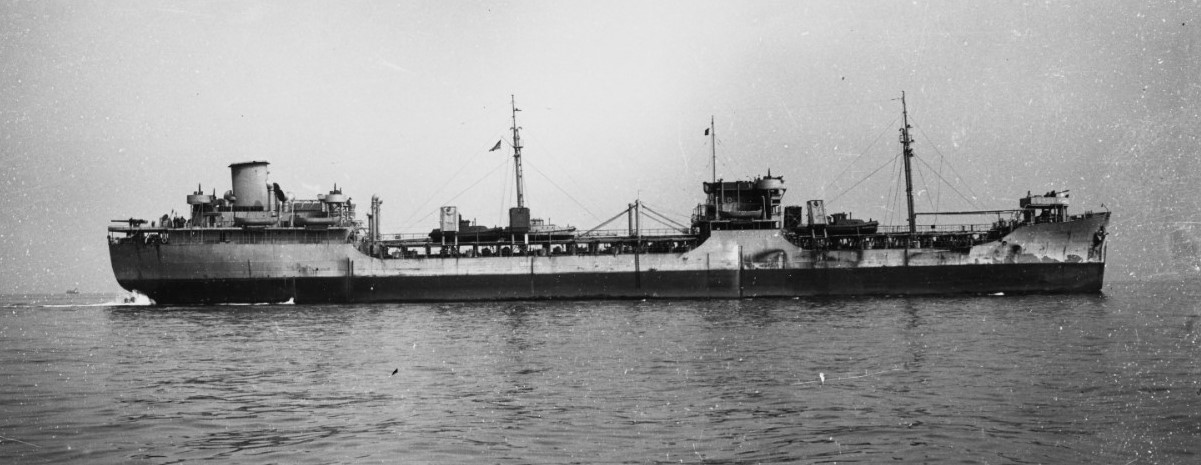
- Company type: American Petroleum Transport Corp. SS Cedar Mills in 1943, a type T2 Tanker, known for saving the Le Triomphant
- Industry: Transportation and shipping
- Founded: 1936 in New York City
- Key people: Daniel K. Ludwig

American Petroleum Transport Corporation (American Petroleum Tpt) was an oil shipping company founded in New York City in 1936. Daniel K. Ludwig was President of American Petroleum Transport Corporation. In 1939 American Petroleum Transport Corporation operated eight tanker ships from the Gulf of Mexico to Hatteras, North Carolina. American Petroleum Transport Corporation was active in supporting the World War II efforts. Some tanker ships American Petroleum Transport Corporation operated were sunk by German U-boat submarines. Daniel K. Ludwig founded in 1936 the company National Bulk Carriers.

== World War II ==
American Petroleum Transport Corporation ships were used to help the World War II effort. During World War II American Petroleum Transport Corporation operated Merchant navy ships for the United States Shipping Board. During World War II American Petroleum Transport Corporation was active with charter shipping with the Maritime Commission and War Shipping Administration. American Petroleum Transport Corporation operated Liberty ships and T2 tankers for the merchant navy. The ship was run by its American Petroleum Transport Corporation crew and the US Navy supplied United States Navy Armed Guards to man the deck guns and radio.

== Ships ==
- Some ships owned:
- Halsey Wreck, tanker built in 1920 by Bethlehem SB Corp, Alameda, California, hit by torpedo and sunk by German submarine U-333 off Jupiter, Florida
- USS Cahaba (AO-82) tanker 1947–1948, built in 1944 a Escambia-class oiler operated 1947 and 1948.
  - World War II operated ships:

Liberty ship of World War II

  - Liberty Ships:
- SS Morton Prince, Liberty Ships
- Horace H. Harvey, Liberty Ship
- SS William Penn, Liberty Ship
- ARA Punta Delgada (B–16), also was MV Sugarland, a T1 tanker, Klickitat-class gasoline tanker.

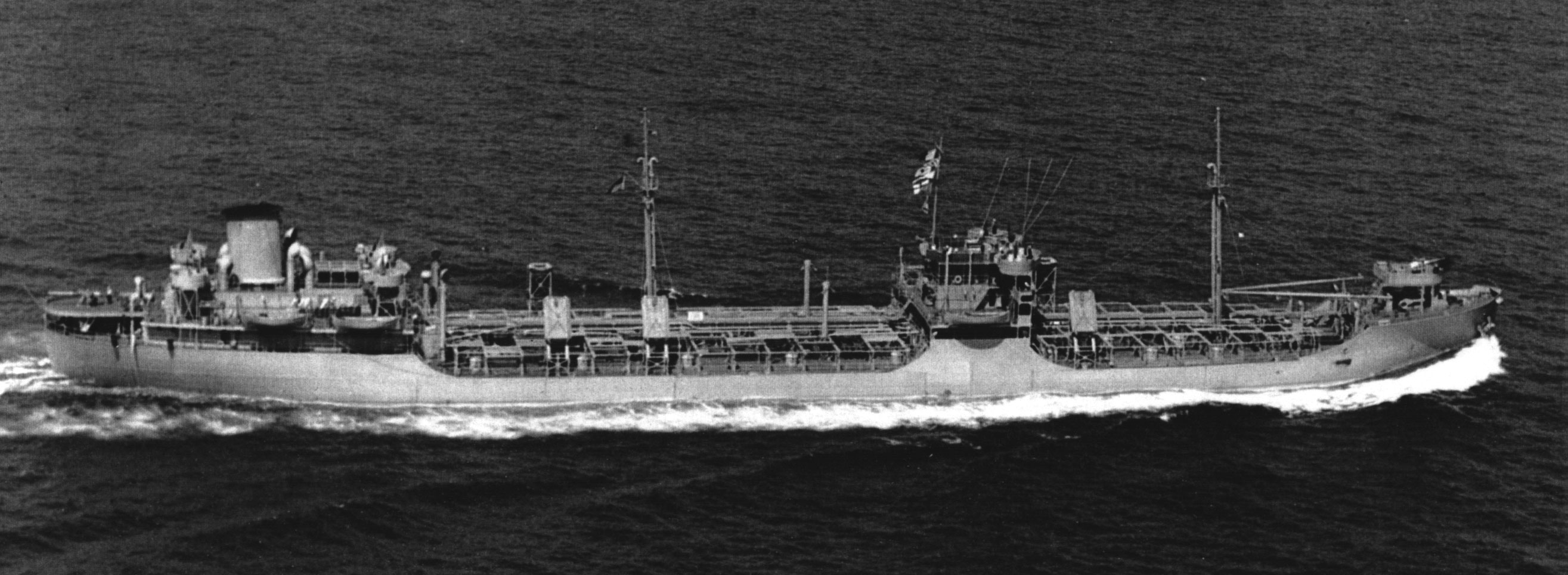
A T2 tanker in 1943

- Four Lakes T2-SE-A1 tanker moved oil from Texas City, Texas to Baltimore, Maryland from 1946 to 1948.
- SS Cedar Mills, T2 tanker was built in 1943 by Alabama Dry Dock and Shipbuilding Company in Mobile, know of saving the French destroyer Le Triomphant
- Crow Wing, T2 tanker (T2-SE-A1), built in 1945 in Mobile, Alabama, on March 30, 1945, collided with another ship.
- Caliche, operated from 1936 to 1943 with PAT, built in 1918 as Chestnut Hill in 1918.
- Fort Laramie, T2-SE-A1 tanker, Built in 1944 in Mobile, Alabama.
- Touchet, T2-SE-A1 tanker, built in 1943 in Mobile, Alabama. Dec. 3, 1943 on maiden voyage hit by German submarine U-193 in gulf.
- Camas Meadows, T2-SE-A1 tanker, built in 1943 in Mobile, Alabama. Rammed and sank the USS St. Augustine (PG-54) on January 6, 1944

== See also ==
- World War II United States Merchant Navy
- List of Type T2 tankers
