= War Emergency Tankers =

Former US shipping company

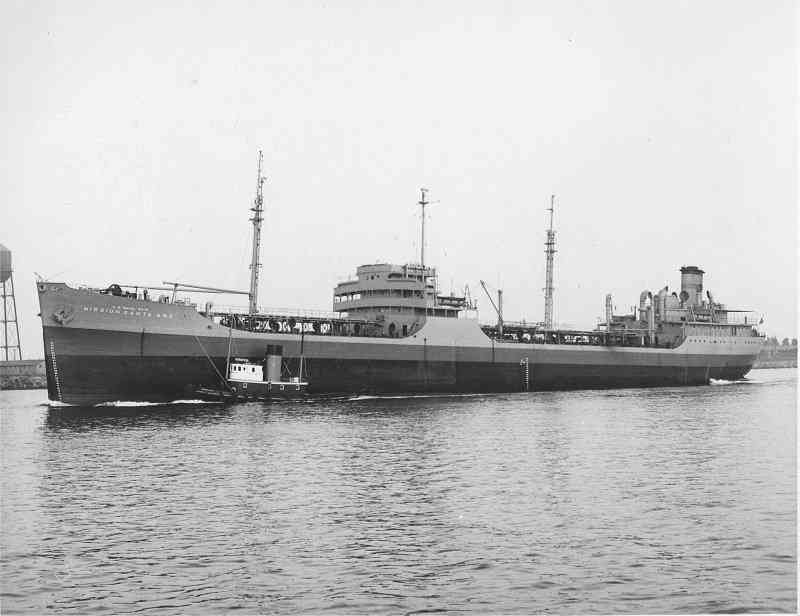
USNS Mission Santa Ana a T2 Tanker getting underway in Long Beach, California

Assembly and Construction of T2 Navy Tankers

War Emergency Tankers of New York City was founded in 1942 to operate Fleet oilers for the United States Navy to support World War II efforts. Texaco, Standard Oil Company and other oil companies enter into a joint venture to form War Emergency Tankers Inc. War Emergency Tankers operated a fleet of tankers for the War Shipping Administration. War Emergency Tankers operated Type T2 tankers and other tankers. War Emergency Tankers was a major tanker operator for the war with a fleet of over 60 tankers. Each War Emergency Tankers tanker had a merchant crew of about 9 officers and 39 men. War Emergency Tankers continued operations after the war for a few years. Mr. T. E. Buchanan was chairman of War Emergency Tankers.

- Some ships operated:
- SS Marine Floridian
- USS Flambeau (IX-192)
- USNS Paoli (T-AO-157)
- SS Four Lakes later (SS V. A. Fogg) ``
- SS George W. Barnes
- SS Vistula
