= USS Flambeau (IX-192) =

History

United States
- Builder: Sun Shipbuilding & Drydock Co.
- Laid down: 1919
- Launched: 14 June 1919
- Completed: August 1919
- Commissioned: 8 January 1945
- Decommissioned: 6 April 1946
- Identification: Official Number 218630
- Fate: Returned to the WSA, scrapped 1947

General characteristics
- Type: Tanker
- Tonnage: 6,840 GRT; 11,205 DWT
- Displacement: 15,800 tons
- Length: 445 ft (136 m) LOA; 430 ft (131.1 m) Registered
- Beam: 59 ft (18 m)
- Draught: 26 ft 8 in (8.13 m)
- Speed: 10 knots
- Complement: 83 officers and men
- Armament: one five-inch gun, one three-inch gun

USS Flambeau (IX-192), was the tanker S. B. Hunt, built for Standard Oil Company of New Jersey. Her keel was laid down in 1919 by Sun Shipbuilding and Drydock Company, in Chester, Pennsylvania with completion August 1919.

S. B. Hunt, Official Number 218630, was 6,840 GRT, 11,205 DWT, 445 ft (135.6 m) length overall, 430 ft (131.1 m) registered tons, 59 ft (18.0 m) beam with a draft of 26 ft 8 in (8.1 m).

The War Shipping Administration (WSA) acquired the ship from Standard Oil 26 April 1942 which was then placed under the U. S. Army control with the civilian owner as operator. On 21 March 1944 operation was taken over by War Emergency Tankers under WSA general agreement. On 7 July 1943 the tanker was in convoy BT-18 and hit by one torpedo fired by U-185 about 125 miles east of Fortaleza, Brazil surviving damage of a 45 ft (13.7 m) feet by 35 ft (10.7 m) hole but no casualties.

S. B. Hunt was allocated and delivered for operation under a bareboat agreement to the Navy 8 January 1945 at Pearl Harbor, and commissioned the same day with Lieutenant R. S. Green, USNR, in command. designated an unclassified miscellaneous vessel, The ship was renamed Flambeau, designated (IX-912), to become the third ship of the United States Navy to be named for a flaming torch.

Flambeau was converted for use as an oil storage ship in which capacity she served at Saipan until July, and then at Iwo Jima. She sailed from Pearl Harbor 30 December for Norfolk, Virginia, where she was decommissioned on 5 April 1946, and returned to the War Shipping Administration.

On the date of return to WSA the ship went into the Reserve Fleet at Lee Hall, Virginia and was sold for scrap on 27 December 1946.
