= SS V. A. Fogg =

Modified T2 tanker ship that sunk in Texas

History

United States
- Name: Four Lakes (1944–1971); V. A. Fogg (1971–1972)
- Owner: U.S. War Shipping Administration (1944–46); U.S. Maritime Commission (1946–56); Tanker Four Lakes, Inc. (1956–71); Ithaca Corp. (1971–72)
- Operator: War Emergency Tankers (1944-45); American Petroleum Transport Corp. (1946-47); Texas City Tankers, Inc. (1956-72)
- Builder: Alabama Dry Dock & Shipbuilding Co., Mobile, Alabama
- Yard number: 268
- Launched: 21 December 1943
- Completed: 26 January 1944
- In service: 29 January 1944
- Identification: Official number: 244971
- Fate: Exploded and sank, 1 February 1972

General characteristics
- Class & type: Modified Type T2-SE-A1 tanker
- Tonnage: As built: 10,448 GRT; 16,613 DWT; After 1959: 12,569 GRT; 19,902 DWT
- Length: As built: 523 ft (159 m); After 1959: 572 ft (174 m)
- Beam: As built: 68 ft (21 m); After 1959: 75 ft 4 in (22.96 m)
- Propulsion: Turbo-electric, 6,000 shp (4,474 kW)
- Speed: 15 knots (28 km/h; 17 mph)
- Range: 12,600 nmi (23,300 km; 14,500 mi)
- Troops: 29 Naval Armed Guard
- Armament: 1944–45; 1 × 5"/38-caliber dual-purpose gun; 1 × 3"/50-caliber dual-purpose gun; 8 × 20 mm anti-aircraft guns

SS V.A. Fogg was a modified T2 tanker built in 1943, as SS Four Lakes. After service in World War II, she was eventually sold into private ownership. She was renamed V.A. Fogg in 1971, shortly before she exploded and sank off Freeport, Texas.

== Service history ==
=== Construction ===
The ship was built by the Alabama Dry Dock & Shipbuilding Company in Mobile, Alabama, as a Type T2-SE-A1 tanker for the U.S. Maritime Commission. She was launched on 21 December 1943 and completed by 26 January 1944.

=== World War II ===
Like most other merchant ships during the war, Four Lakes was fitted with a defensive armament. This consisted of a 5"/38 caliber dual-purpose gun at the stern, a 3"/50 caliber dual-purpose gun in the bows, and eight 20 mm anti-aircraft guns. These were operated by a crew of 29 men of the Naval Armed Guard; a lieutenant, 25 gunners and three signalmen.

The Four Lakes was operated under charter on behalf of the War Shipping Administration by War Emergency Tankers and sailed from Mobile on her maiden voyage on 29 January 1944, commanded by Captain Elmer O. Wolfe. She arrived at Galveston, Texas, the following day to take aboard a cargo of kerosene, which she delivered to New York on 9 February. She then sailed to Baton Rouge, Louisiana, to take on a cargo of gasoline, before returning to New York, where she joined a convoy bound for Liverpool, England, arriving there on 12 March. Four Lakes returned to New York, for another cargo of gasoline in April and made two further trans-Atlantic round trips in May and June, often with an additional cargo of aircraft on her deck. On 1 July she sailed in convoy to Casablanca, French Morocco, carrying fuel and aircraft. After offloading she sailed to Gibraltar, and was promptly placed in quarantine for 10 days, because of a suspected outbreak of bubonic plague in Casablanca. After three weeks she joined a convoy bound for New York, arriving there on 3 August. Four Lakes sailed on two further convoys between the U.S. and the U.K. in August and September, before taking a cargo of gasoline from New York to Naples, Italy, in October. On 23 November she sailed in convoy from New York to Swansea, Wales, with a cargo of aviation fuel, returning to Baltimore, Maryland, on 23 December.

On 19 January 1945, following a refit Four Lakes sailed independently from New York to Madras, India, via the Suez Canal, with a cargo of 100-octane fuel and 12 military aircraft on deck. She arrived at Madras on 20 February, unloaded and then sailed via Calcutta for Abadan, Iran, at the northern end of the Persian Gulf, to take on a cargo of 80-octane gasoline. She transited the Suez Canal, and arrived at Naples on 7 April to unload. She then sailed for New York, arriving on 23 April. The next day she joined another convoy, which arrived in the Thames Estuary on 5 May, two days before the German surrender. Four Lakes sailed from Southend, Essex, on 8 May, and although the war in Europe was officially over, the normal wartime routine was maintained, with the ship sailing in convoy with a naval escort, and arriving at New York on 19 May. On 4 June, following a refit with a cargo of 100-octane gasoline and P-51 Mustang fighters as deck cargo, she sailed for Madras, India, arriving there on 4 July. She then sailed to Abadan to take on a load of diesel oil, before proceeding independently to Darwin, Australia. From Darwin she sailed with two other merchant vessels, escorted by three warships, to the Philippines, arriving at Manila on 22 August. Following the surrender of Japan on 2 September, Four Lakes sailed across the Pacific, and in late October, carried diesel fuel from the Panama Canal Zone to San Pedro, California. She then sailed through the Panama Canal, and arrived at Houston, Texas, on 19 November. In December, she sailed to Hamburg, Germany.

=== Post-war ===
In February 1946, the Four Lakes was rechartered to the American Petroleum Transport Corporation, and in July, carried a cargo from Texas City, Texas, to Baltimore, Maryland. She was again chartered to the American Petroleum Transport Corp. in 1947, but otherwise remained as part of the Reserve Fleet at Mobile, Alabama.

She was finally sold in 1956 to Tanker Four Lakes, Inc. of Wilmington, Delaware, and was operated under a bareboat charter by Texas City Refinery, Inc. (later renamed Texas City Tankers, Inc.) on routes between the Gulf Coast and the East Coast, transporting a variety of petrochemical products.

In 1959 the ship was extended by the Maryland Shipbuilding and Drydock Company by cutting the hull in half and inserting a new midsection, built by the American Bridge Division of Orange, Texas, part of the U.S. Steel Corporation. This increased the length of the ship from 523 feet (159 m) to 572 feet (174 m), and increased her size from 10,448 to 12,569 gross register tons (GRT).

=== Sinking ===
In 1971 Four Lakes was sold to Ithaca Corporation of Wilmington, Delaware, and was renamed V.A. Fogg on 11 August.

On 1 February 1972, the ship, commanded by Captain John Edward Christy Sr., sailed from Freeport, Texas to a point 50 miles (80 km) offshore to clean its cargo tanks of remaining benzene residue, before sailing to Galveston to load a cargo of xylene. The ship exploded during the cleaning operation, sending up a column of smoke over 10,000 feet (3,000 m) in height.

On 1 February, a large smoke cloud was reported by a NASA pilot and a commercial airliner. A Coast Guard aircraft flew to the cloud and investigated it. Due to lack of light it stopped searching after two hours but returned the next morning. Nothing was spotted after nearly three hours. Later that day the company notified the Coast Guard that the tanker was overdue, leading to the smoke being associated with the tanker. Two aircraft together with surface vessels were dispatched to search.

The Coast Guard carried out aerial and surface searches over ten days, finding some debris. These searches were chiefly to the southwest of the ship's actual position. The ship was found by MV Miss Freeport using sidescan sonar. Divers positively identified the wreck on 13 February.

A private charter hired by family members found the vessel, from the coordinates of a NASA pilot who saw a mushroom cloud in the Gulf, and a person off the Galveston jetties who saw a ball of fire. The private charter took those two coordinates and went directly to V. A. Fogg. A search found the ship lying in 100 feet (30 m) of water in two sections, at position 28°35′36.6″N 94°48′44.937″W.

An examination revealed that the cargo section was almost totally destroyed by the explosion, and the engine order telegraph still registering "full ahead". All of V.A. Fogg's crew members lost their lives. However, the chief radio officer, William A. Shaw, had left the ship for an emergency medical procedure only a few hours before the ship exploded.

The Coast Guard investigation revealed a lack of proper training by the crew or contractors in venting and cleaning benzene, which can explode if residual fumes come in contact with an electrical charge; such a charge may have come from a "red devil" blower, a device used to ventilate spaces. Witnesses had seen red devil blowers lowered into the holds by the crew in the past, and one was recovered from the wreckage, in the hold and rigged to be used.

Within a year of her sinking, V. A. Fogg was subject to the writings of various Bermuda Triangle authors, some contending that no bodies were recovered except that of the captain, who was found sitting in his cabin still holding a coffee cup. The explanations were easily refuted by official United States Coast Guard records and photographs, as well as the recovery of several bodies. John Wallace Spencer (author of Limbo of the Lost) claimed the incident had "paranormal" connections, for which he was widely ridiculed by fellow researchers and skeptical writers alike. In fact, three bodies were recovered (only two, including the captain, were identified), and it was not even close to the Bermuda Triangle.

Currently, the wreckage of V.A. Fogg shares space with a number of sunken Liberty ships and barges in what has since been called the Freeport Liberty Ship Reef Site, an underwater park catering to fishermen.

== Memorial ==
An anchor from V. A. Fogg is on display outside the Texas City Museum, Texas City, with a plaque commemorating the 39 men lost aboard her.
