= USS Nanticoke (AOG-66) =

World war II gasoline tanker

History

United States
- Name: Nanticoke
- Namesake: Nanticoke River in Delaware and Maryland
- Ordered: as type (T1-M-BT1) hull, MC hull 2626
- Awarded: 26 July 1944
- Builder: St. Johns River Shipbuilding Company, Jacksonville, Florida
- Cost: $1,022,203.48
- Yard number: 85
- Way number: 1
- Laid down: 16 January 1945
- Launched: 7 April 1945
- Commissioned: 1 September 1945
- Decommissioned: 4 January 1946
- Stricken: 21 January 1946
- Identification: Hull symbol: AOG-66; Call sign: NDCQ
- Fate: Transferred to the Maritime Commission (MARCOM), 12 January 1946; Laid up in the James River Reserve Fleet, Lee Hall, Virginia; Sold for commercial use, 8 June 1948

United States
- Name: Sugarland
- Owner: American Petroleum Transport Corp.
- Fate: Sold to Argentina, December 1946

Argentina
- Name: Punta Delgada
- Namesake: Punta Delgada
- Stricken: 1984
- Identification: Hull symbol: B-16
- Fate: Caught fire and capsized, 4 March 1985

General characteristics
- Class & type: Klickitat-class gasoline tanker
- Type: Type T1-MT-BT1 tanker
- Displacement: 1,980 long tons (2,012 t) (light); 5,970 long tons (6,066 t) (full load)
- Length: 325 ft 2 in (99.11 m)
- Beam: 48 ft 2 in (14.68 m)
- Draft: 19 ft (5.8 m)
- Installed power: 1 × Enterprise DNQ-38 Diesel engine; 800 shp (600 kW)
- Propulsion: 1 × Westinghouse main reduction gears; 1 × shaft
- Speed: 10 kn (19 km/h; 12 mph)
- Capacity: 10,465 bbl (1,663.8 m^{3}) (Diesel); 871,332 US gal (3,298,350 L; 725,536 imp gal) (Gasoline)
- Complement: 80
- Armament: 1 × 3 in (76 mm)/50 caliber dual-purpose (DP) gun; 2 × 40 mm (1.57 in) Bofors anti-aircraft (AA) gun mounts; 3 × 20 mm (0.79 in) Oerlikon cannon AA gun mounts

USS Nanticoke (AOG-66), was a type T1 Klickitat-class gasoline tanker built for the US Navy during World War II. She was named after the Nanticoke River, in Delaware and Maryland.

== Construction ==
Nanticoke was laid down on 16 January 1945, under a Maritime Commission (MARCOM) contract, MC hull 2626, by the St. Johns River Shipbuilding Company, Jacksonville, Florida; sponsored by Mrs. Gustav W. Nelson; acquired by the Navy 31 August 1945; and commissioned 1 September 1945.

== Service history ==
Assigned to the Naval Transportation Service, Nanticoke reported for duty on 18 October, to the Service Force, US Atlantic Fleet. Arriving at Norfolk, Virginia, on 28 November, she was decommissioned there on 4 January 1946, and returned to MARCOM on 12 January 1946.

Briefly operated by the American Petroleum Transport Corporation as MV Sugarland in 1946, she was acquired later in the year by the Argentine Navy and commissioned as ARA Punta Delgada (B–16). She served as part of the Argentine Navy until 1984, when she burnt and sank off La Plata, 4 March 1985.

== Bibliography ==
- "Nanticoke". Dictionary of American Naval Fighting Ships. Naval History and Heritage Command. This article incorporates text from this source, which is in the public domain.
- "USS Nanticoke (AOG-66)". NavSource. 19 December 2014.
- "St. John's River Shipbuilding, Jacksonville FL". www.ShipbuildingHistory.com. 16 October 2010.
- Maritime Administration. "Nanticoke". Ship History Database Vessel Status Card. U.S. Department of Transportation, Maritime Administration.
- "USS Nanticoke".
