= Benjamin Harrison Memorial Bridge =

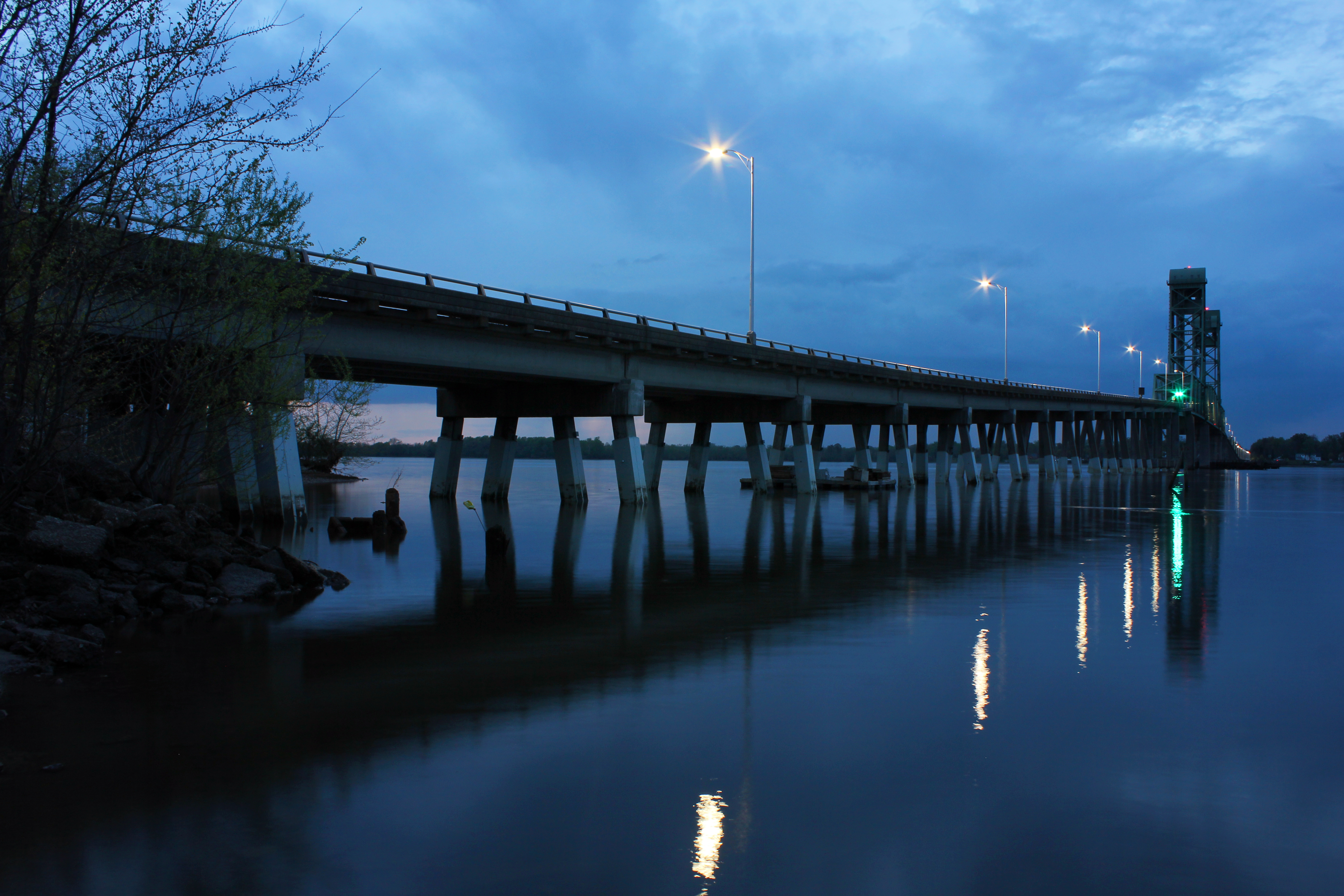
- Coordinates: 37°19′08″N 77°13′26″W
- Carries: SR 106 / SR 156
- Crosses: James River
- Locale: Jordan's Point
- Named for: Benjamin Harrison
- Owner: Virginia Department of Transportation
- Maintained by: VDOT

Characteristics
- Total length: 1 mile
- Longest span: 360ft
- No. of spans: 5

History
- Engineering design by: Hardesty & Hanover L.L.P.
- Opened: 1966
- Replaces: Ferry service

Location
- Interactive map of Benjamin Harrison Memorial Bridge

The Benjamin Harrison Memorial Bridge is a vertical-lift bridge that spans the James River between Jordan's Point in Prince George County and Charles City County near Hopewell, Virginia. The bridge carries vehicle traffic of State Route 106 and State Route 156, and is owned by the Virginia Department of Transportation (VDOT). It is named after Benjamin Harrison V, a signer of the Declaration of Independence and a Governor of Virginia, who lived nearby at Berkeley Plantation.

Originally completed in 1966, it was substantially rebuilt following a February 24, 1977, collision by a ship. Repairs took 20 months to complete. The cost of repairs and operation of a temporary passenger shuttle service were $9.7 million. The costs were recovered from the insurer for the shipping company following a lawsuit in U.S. District Court.

Working in conjunction with the College of William and Mary in Williamsburg, the Benjamin Harrison Bridge and its VDOT staff host a successful breeding program for peregrine falcons on its high towers.

== History ==
The mile-long drawbridge replaced ferry service when it was completed in 1966 by Hardesty & Hanover L.L.P., a New York-based bridge engineering firm. It featured a 360-foot-long (110 m) vertical lift span to facilitate passage of shipping traffic on this portion of the James River, which is navigable from Hampton Roads upstream to the Port of Richmond, about 23 miles (37 km) west of the bridge.

=== Tanker ship crashes into bridge ===
On February 24, 1977, the Benjamin Harrison Memorial Bridge was the scene of a spectacular and costly incident. A small, ocean-going, WWII-surplus tanker ship, the 5,700 ton, 523-ft long SS Marine Floridian, was eastbound, heading downriver from Allied Signal Corp. in Hopewell, Virginia. Once underway and only a short distance from the Benjamin Harrison Bridge, the steering gear that powers the ships rudder malfunctioned, and caused the ship to suddenly lose control and ability to maneuver.

The bridge tender had placed the lift span in the "raised" position in anticipation of the ship's passage, and motorists were sitting in their vehicles behind the warning gates waiting. As the large ship veered off course to the north and blew warning blasts on its horn, the occupants of southbound vehicles waiting on the bridge saw the ship coming directly toward them, and managed to get out of their cars and run to safety before the ship rammed the bridge.

As the ship departed the channel to the north, the crew blew the emergency signal of six blasts on the ship's horn, put the engine into reverse and dropped the starboard anchor to attempt to steer the ship back into the main channel, but it was too late to counteract the tons of momentum. The ship missed the opened, movable, portion of the bridge over the main channel, and struck part of the fixed span. One section of the concrete bridge deck adjacent the north tower and two unoccupied vehicles tumbled into the river. The vehicles included a Ford conversion van belonging to a person from the Virginia Beach area and a pickup truck belonging to a local plumbing company. The bridge structure of the north tower stopped the ship's forward movement when the lower part struck the deckhouse. The bridge tender, a state employee, was trapped in the control booth located on the raised lift span near the south end. Despite the considerable damage, there were no serious injuries or fatalities. Immediately after the collision, a tugboat, the Virginia B., raced downriver from Hopewell to the scene of the collision. A resident of the Jordan Point Yacht Haven launched a 19-foot runabout and with the help of a local rescue squad member began a search of the area for survivors. The US Coast Guard Strike Team 1 deployed Lt. Cmdr Chambers and an enlisted diver to the scene by helicopter. The diver operated off the resident's runabout for 3 days until their dive boat arrived on scene.

=== Post-collision actions ===
Representatives of the National Transportation Safety Board (NTSB), the United States Coast Guard, and Virginia Governor Mills E. Godwin Jr.'s Office of Emergency Services responded to the scene. Civil engineering contractors were summoned to assess damages and assist with planning repairs to the bridge. Local land and water transportation contractors were solicited to immediately develop proposals to provide alternate transportation for displaced motorists.

According to official state records, the damage to the bridge entailed the "destruction of two spans north of the lift span, the north tower, the lift span, and serious damage to the south tower." and "elimination of both highway and river traffic with immediate serious effect upon highway users and industries relying upon supplies by water"

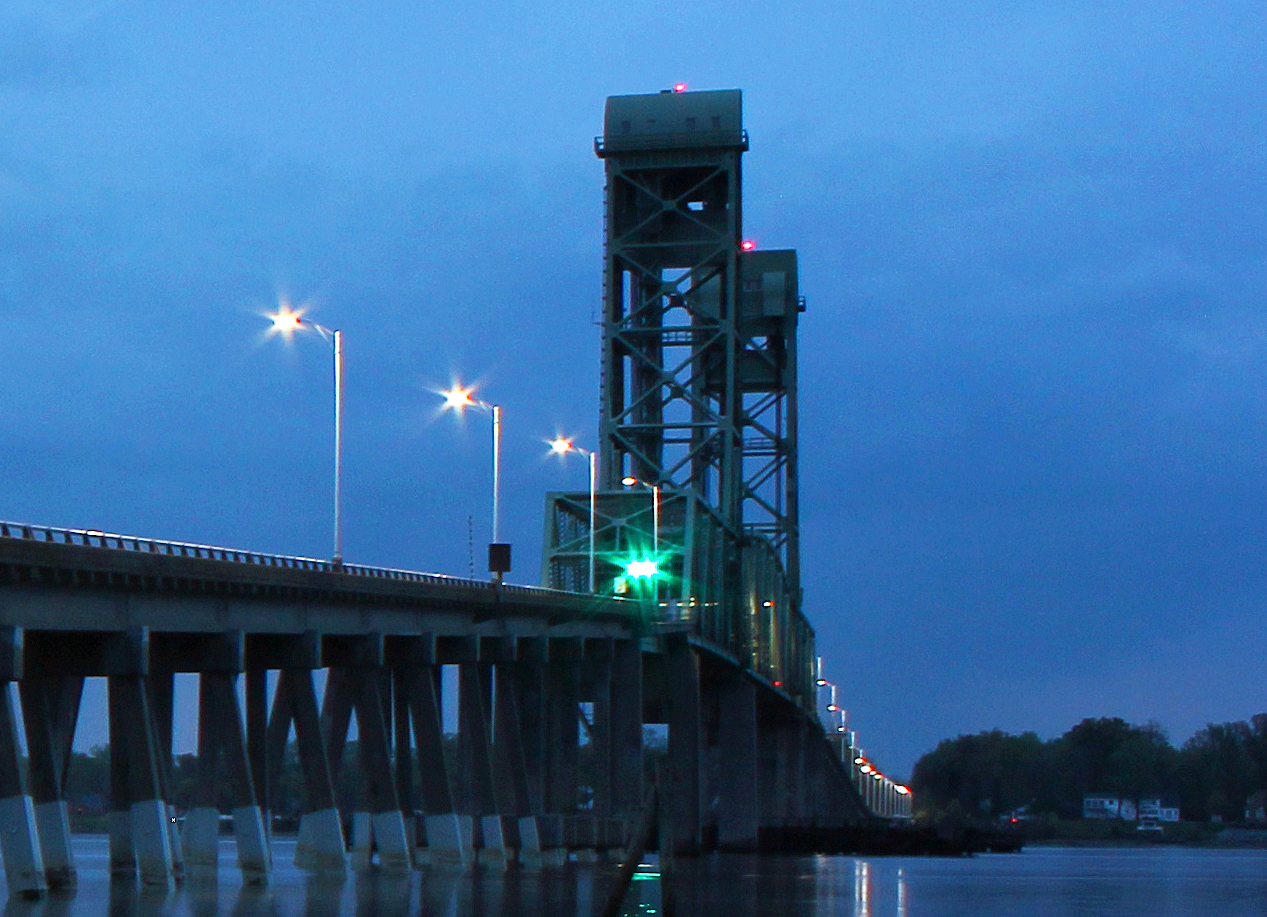
Benjamin Harrison Memorial Bridge at night

=== Special arrangements to help displaced commuters ===
While river traffic was restored in relatively short order, the loss of the bridge as a highway artery caused substantial hardship to commuters and the communities on both sides of the river beginning immediately after the collision.

Prior to completion of the bridge in 1966, an automobile-carrying passenger ferry service had operated at this location, but the docks had rotted and silt had filled in the areas where the large ferryboats, if their service was to be restored, would need to dock. Due to a dredging restriction in place because of Kepone contamination, it was not feasible to restore the automobile-carrying ferry service, although a similar operation was still serving about 35 miles (56 km) downstream at the Jamestown Ferry.

Alternative driving routes were unacceptably lengthy. The only fixed crossing downstream was the James River Bridge, which would require an additional 130-mile (210 km) drive. The nearest highway bridge upstream was located on Interstate 95 at Richmond, necessitating an additional driving distance of over 50 miles (80 km). The existing Jamestown Ferry service about 35 miles (56 km) downstream between Scotland in Surry County and Glass House Point in James City County was already operating at capacity, with delays during peak commuting hours.

Later on the day of the incident, state officials called upon local bus, taxicab, and water transportation providers, including both Greyhound Lines and Trailways, to offer potential solutions for the commuters. Richmond-based Virginia Overland Transportation (VOTC), which managed several of the state's older urban-suburban bus lines, was contracted to implement a shuttle bus and passenger van system on each side of the river. These were coordinated with a passenger ferry system contracted by VDOT from another company. The passenger ferry had small craft which could utilize the old ferry landings without dredging operations.

The contractors were given only 3 business days to have their emergency operations in place. The contractors met the state's deadline, and their service operated from dawn to dusk, with schedules adjusted to suit commuters as much as possible. Virginia Overland used two-way radio-equipped vans and school buses based on each side of the river to coordinate with the passenger ferries. Expanded parking was provided by VDOT at both docks.

The van and bus service on the south shore ran between the dock at Jordan's Point and various schools and places of employment, including many businesses in Prince George County, Hopewell and notably Fort Gregg-Adams, a United States Army installation located in Prince George. In the opposite situation, some workers who lived on the south side of the river, parked and rode the ferry, and then vans or buses transported them to employment, mostly at Charles City County schools and other governmental agencies.

Additionally, a light-duty car-float, which was essentially a barge guided by a tugboat, was later introduced which could transport a small number of automobiles and light trucks during favorable weather conditions, to supplement the passenger ferry. However, the car-float, which rode quite close to the water, and resembled a raft, was considered somewhat unstable by some commuters, and the original "Park and Ride and Ride" services continued for 20 months until the bridge was reopened.

=== Reconstruction of the bridge ===
About 10 days after the initial collision, the damaged south tower which was supporting one end of the lift span (which had been askew with the north end down along with the north tower, and the south end still up) collapsed onto the ship. A total reconstruction of the lift portion of the bridge and several spans of the north approach was required. This was accomplished by McLean Contracting Company out of Baltimore Maryland, supervised by Bill Sinclair.

The reconstruction of the damaged bridge was to cost 9.5 million dollars and take 20 months to complete. One design change incorporated was relocation of the bridge tender's station to a fixed portion of the structure which did not go up and down with the lift span. Another major design flaw with the bridge was not fixed. Shortly before the incident Captains Ron Blaha (Blaha Towing Company) and Virginia Pilot Bobby Stone (Virginia Pilots Association) stated during an interview on local television news that because the drawbridge was located at a bend in the channel the traffic gates should be moved back away from the channel to prevent cars from falling into the river in the event that a ship was unable to make the turn and hit the fixed span. VDOT had previously been advised that the bridge was in such a position along the channel that this type of accident was possible. Following the incident, the news media picked up on the fact that Captains Stone and Blaha had previously warned that the traffic gates should be moved, however the traffic gates were never relocated by VDOT.

=== Fault, liability for damages ===
The NTSB issued a report, MAR-78-01, which was adopted on January 1, 1978. The investigation made recommendations for future prevention. The State of Virginia filed suit in U.S. District Court against the shipping company operating the Marine Floridian, which was found to be liable for the damages, a decision affirmed by the U.S. 4th Circuit Court of Appeals. The rebuilt Benjamin Harrison Memorial Bridge was reopened to traffic in the fall of 1978. The total cost of damages from the incident was $9.7 million.

== Peregrine falcon program ==
Eastern Virginia has long been a habitat for once endangered birds, notably bald eagles and peregrine falcons. The Virginia Department of Transportation (VDOT) has come to learn that some of its high bridge structures closely match their preferred nesting environment on cliff faces and in high trees.

In an award-winning program, nesting boxes for these rare birds were established in several bridges, including the Benjamin Harrison Memorial Bridge. Bridge pairs now represent approximately 30 percent of the Virginia peregrine falcon population. In a major victory for the endangered species, and VDOT's environmental efforts, in the spring of 2003, nearly a dozen peregrine falcon chicks were hatched. Most were taken from their nesting boxes on various VDOT bridges for banding and release.

That spring, three chicks or "eyases" on the Benjamin Harrison Bridge on Route 156 over the James River were banded with a transmitter for tracking purposes, and two were released at Shenandoah National Park. Environmentalists like to leave one chick with its parents when possible, but the birds have a better chance of staying alive when released in the wild. One concern is that a falcon learning to fly may not survive a fall onto a bridge or even the water below.

VDOT employees who work on the bridge can see the nesting box on top of the tower from where they work. They can see into the nest when they go up into the tower to work on the mechanisms used to open the drawbridge. The drawbridge is opened on demand sometimes three or four times a day, but some days not at all. The openings do not disturb the peregrine falcons. Bridge employees keep the Center for Conservation Biology at the College of William and Mary informed of the birds' movements.

Peregrine falcons were listed as federally endangered in 1970 under the Endangered Species Conservation Act. At that time, there were virtually none in the east, and the population in the rest of the country had fallen by 80 to 90 percent. Beginning in the 1970s, a national effort was undertaken to recover breeding populations and to restore the species. Their population has significantly recovered over the past 30 years, thanks to conservation efforts such as VDOT's. Today, more than 1,500 breeding pairs have been counted in the U.S. and Canada.

Along with the U.S. Fish and Wildlife Service, the Virginia Department of Game and Inland Fisheries and the Conservation Center, VDOT monitors the falcons on each bridge to ensure they and their habitat are doing well. VDOT has even established falcon-specific contract requirements for the Structure and Bridge Division as it continues to identify other nesting sites.

Through placement of nesting boxes on 10 bridges maintained by VDOT, the endangered peregrine falcons – considered the world's fastest birds – once again fly high over Virginia's eastern seaboard. Because of the significant role it played in the recovery of the peregrine falcon in Virginia, VDOT earned the 1998 Federal Highway Administration Excellence Award in the category of Environment Protection and Enhancements.
