= USNS Paoli =

Oiler of the United States Navy

USNS Paoli (T-AO-157)
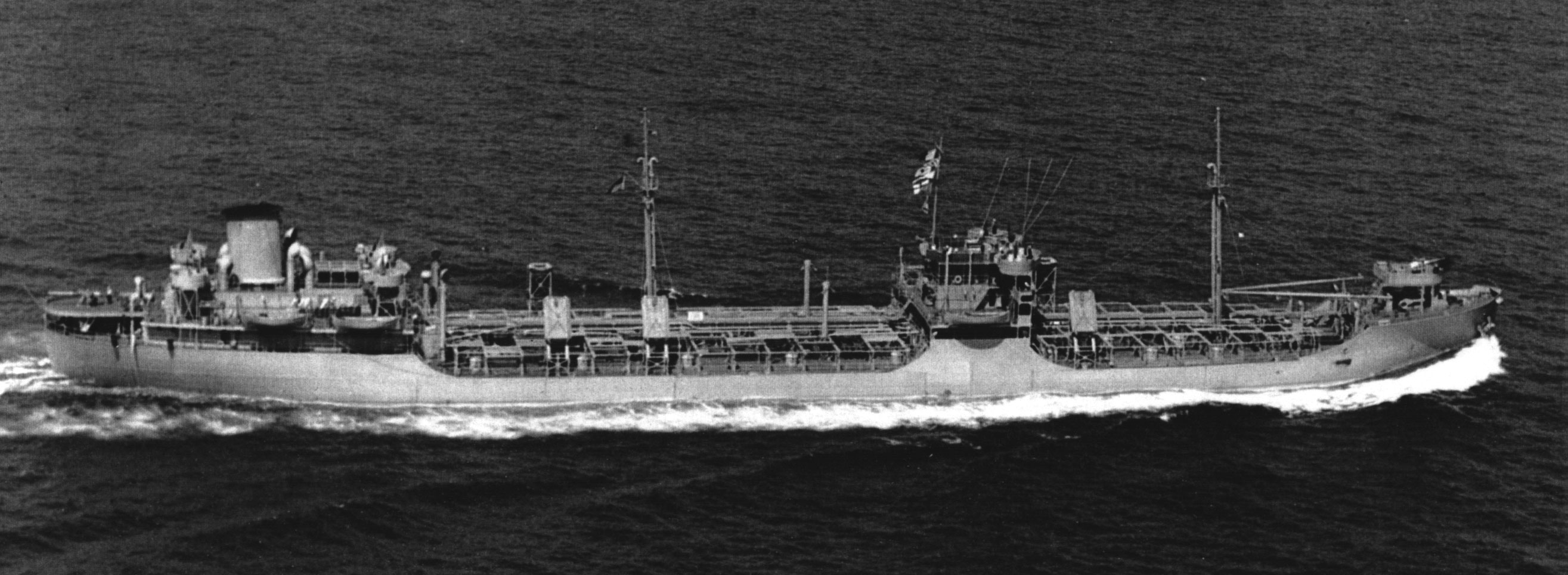
- Type T2-SE-A1 tanker in 1943

History

United States
- Name: Paoli
- Namesake: Paoli, Pennsylvania
- Owner: Maritime Commission (1944–1947); Cities Service Oil Co. (1947–1955); Maritime Commission (1955–1956); US Navy (1956–1957); Marine Navigation Sulphur Carriers (1966–)
- Operator: War Emergency Tankers (1944–1946); Sieling & Jarvis (1946–1955); Marine Transport Line (1956–1957)
- Builder: Sun Shipbuilding & Drydock Co., Chester, Pennsylvania
- Yard number: 401
- Laid down: 18 July 1944
- Launched: 31 October 1944
- Sponsored by: Mrs. Lina Martin
- In service: 15 October 1956
- Out of service: 2 October 1957
- Renamed: Maritime Floridian (1966)
- Stricken: 2 October 1957
- Fate: Sold, 1966
- Name: Marine Floridian (1966–c.1997)
- Acquired: 1966
- Name: Belofin Floridian (c.1997)
- Identification: IMO number: 5270208
- Fate: Scrapped, 1997

General characteristics
- Type: T2–SE–A1 tanker
- Displacement: 5,782 long tons (5,875 t) light; 21,880 long tons (22,231 t) full
- Length: 523 ft 6 in (159.56 m)
- Beam: 68 ft (21 m)
- Draft: 30 ft (9.1 m)
- Propulsion: Turbo-electric, single screw, 8,000 hp (5,966 kW)
- Speed: 15.5 knots (28.7 km/h; 17.8 mph)
- Capacity: 140,000 barrels (22,000 m^{3})
- Complement: 251
- Armament: None

USNS Paoli (T-AO-157) was a Gettysburg-class fuel tanker, built at Sun Shipbuilding & Drydock Co. in Chester, Pennsylvania. A Type T2–SE–A1 tanker, it was hull number 401 and Maritime Commission number 1734. The ship was laid down on 18 July 1944, launched on 31 October 1944, sponsored by Mrs. Lina Martin, and delivered to the Maritime Commission on 11 November 1944 for operation by War Emergency Tankers, New York City.

== Service history ==
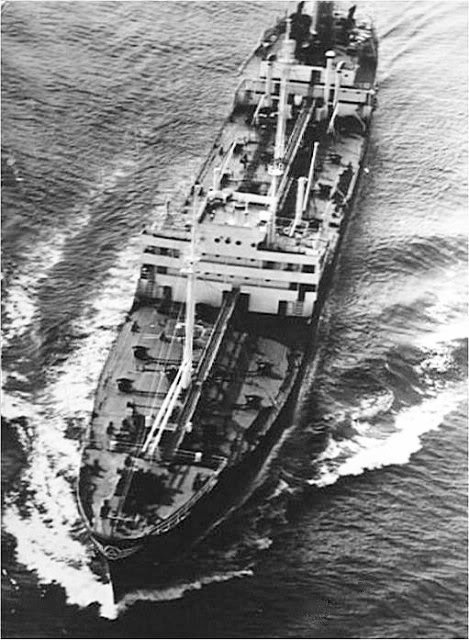
USNS Paoli (T-AO-157)

Paoli made oil runs to the United Kingdom, between the Caribbean and the east coast; and to the Persian Gulf during World War II.

On 5 January 1946, the ship was transferred to Sieling & Jarvis of Newport News, Virginia, and then sold to Cities Service Oil Co., on 14 January 1947, for $1,797,871.78. The ship was returned to the Maritime Commission on 23 March 1955, at Beaumont, Texas, for lay up.

Paoli was acquired by the United States Navy from the Maritime Administration as political tensions in the Middle East heightened. The ship was assigned to the Military Sea Transportation Service (MSTS), as USNS Paoli (T-AO-157) on 15 October 1956, and was operated by Marine Transport Lines Inc. Paoli served until returned to MARAD custody and struck from the Navy List on 2 October 1957.

== SS Marine Floridian ==
On 2 February 1966, the ship was transferred to Marine Navigation Sulphur Carriers Inc., and rebuilt into a liquid sulfur carrier at Baltimore and renamed SS Marine Floridian. She was a 5,700 ton, 523-foot-long (159 m) ocean-going tanker. On 24 February 1977, Marine Floridian collided with the Benjamin Harrison Bridge, a drawbridge over the James River near Hopewell, Virginia. The collision closed the bridge to traffic for 20 months and resulted in damages totaling $9.7 million. The ship was later renamed SS Belofin Floridian shortly before being scrapped in 1997.
