= Sieling & Jarvis =

Shipping company that operated tanker ships

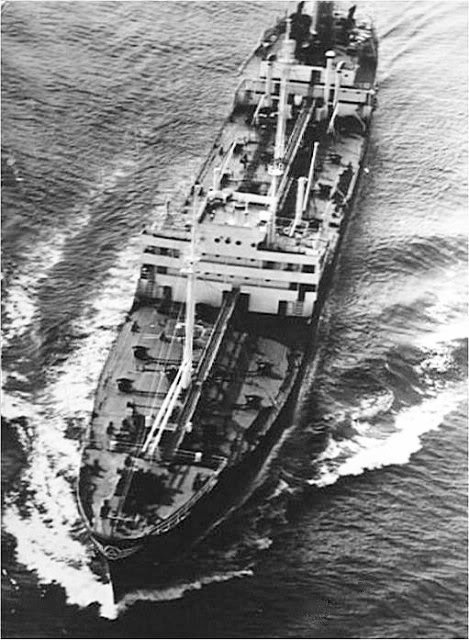
SS Paoli operated by Sieling & Jarvis from 1946 to 1955, a T2 tanker built in 1944

Sieling & Jarvis Inc. was a shipping company that operated tanker ships and some cargo ships. Sieling & Jarvis was started by David B. Jarvis and Dick Sieling in New York City. Later David B. Jarvis was the company president and later became the sole owner of Sieling & Jarvis Inc. Mr. Sieling was the vice president and a partner in Sieling & Jarvis. Sieling & Jarvis supported the World War II effort by operating United States owned ships.

== World War II ==
Before starting Sieling & Jarvis, David B. Jarvis was with the Three Star Line, in Red Hook, Brooklyn, starting in 1921. Three Star Line had passenger service to Spain, North Africa and Marseilles from the Erie Basin, Red Hook Brooklyn. Before the Three Star Line Jarvis was with Callaghan, Atkinson & Company, a tanker firm, that was founded in 1914 in New York City. Sieling & Jarvis fleet of ships were used to help the World War II effort. During World War II Sieling & Jarvis operated Merchant navy ships for the United States Shipping Board. During World War II Sieling & Jarvis was active with charter shipping with the Maritime Commission and War Shipping Administration. Sieling & Jarvis operated fuel tanker ships for the merchant navy. The ship was run by its Sieling & Jarvis crew and the US Navy supplied United States Navy Armed Guards to man the deck guns and radio.

== Post war ==
Sieling & Jarvis were shipping agents for the United Tanker Corporation in 1949, United Tanker was founded on December 10, 1947. Post war Sieling & Jarvis became agents for Collin & Gissel's tankers. Sieling & Jarvis became operating agents for ships for the Soviet Union in 1949, to take fuel to North China. Sieling & Jarvis used the tankers: SS Kettleman Hills and SS St. Christopher. In April 1950 Sieling & Jarvis the United States Department of State told Sieling & Jarvis that US ships could not be used to support the Soviet Union or China, as Economic Cooperation Administration funds were involved. The Korean War started June 25, 1950, and China was supporting North Korea. Sieling & Jarvis transferred to a London company. the Sieling & Jarvis as operating agents China shipping was discussed in a Sale of Government-Owned Surplus Tanker Vessels Hearings before the United States Congress in March 1952. David B. Jarvis testefided that the charter was routine commercial operation made with the complete knowledge of the State Department.

== Tanker ships ==
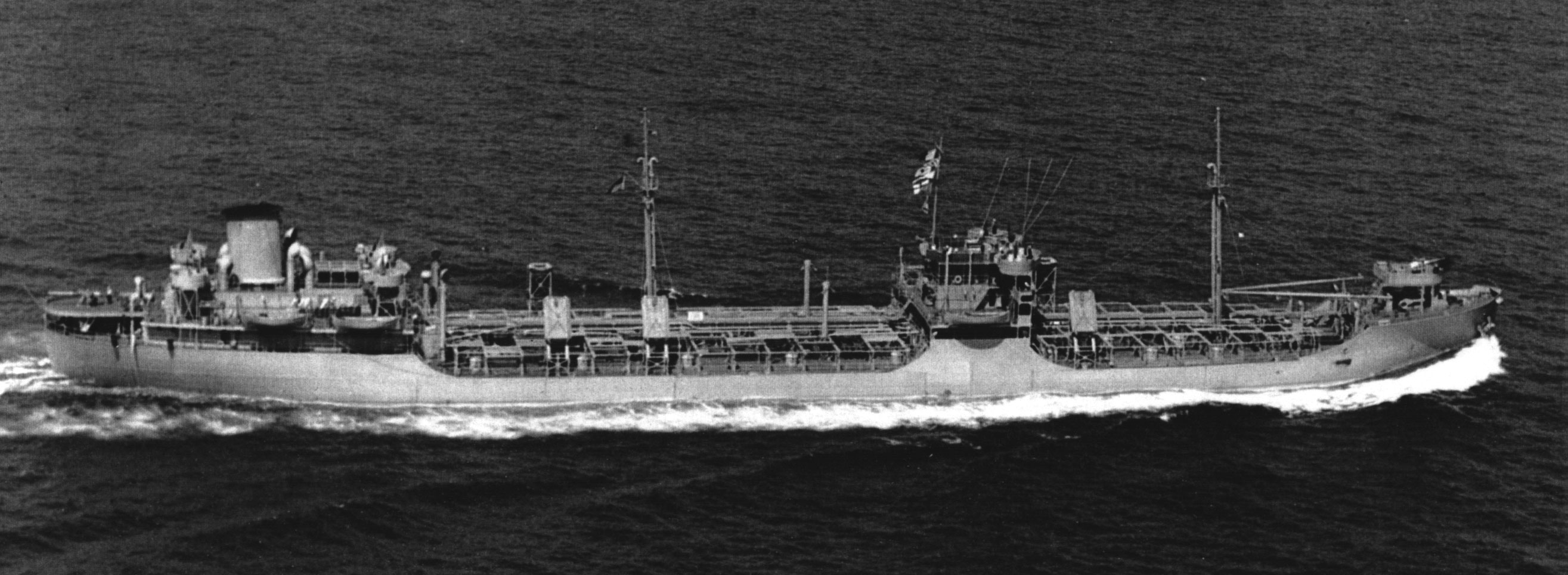
A type T2-SE-A1 tanker in 1943

For World War II, Sieling & Jarvis operated 20 tankers by 1943. Most tankers were type T2 tankers and a few T1 tankers.

- Some of the tankers were:
- SS New Hope at T2-SE-A1 tanker
- SS Cacalilao (1943–1946) built by Bethlehem Steel in 1919
- SS Bradford Island (1945–1947) T2 tanker built by Kaiser Company at Swan Island in 1945
- SS Kingston, built as SS Reginald A. Fessenden, (1948–1950) Liberty ship
- SS Paoli (1946–1955) a T2 tanker built in 1944
- SS Bahram, built as SS Empire Doris in 1944. (1945) from France in 1944.
- SS Clearwater Park (1951–1955)
- SS Lorenzo (1951–155)
- SS Aztec, (1944) built as SS Bramell Point in 1916
- SS Foundation (1952–1955) built as SS Laurel Leaf in 1916
- SS Kettleman Hills built in 1944, renamed SS Caribbean Star 1960. scrapped in Spain in 1965.
- SS Foundation Star built in 1916, operated in 1952, on September 10, 1952, broke in two.
- SS St. Christopher, 26,878‐ton T2 tanker

== SS Foundation Star ==
SS Foundation Star in 1923, as SS Lampas

SS Foundation Star was a steam tanker that broke in two 130 miles (210 km) off Cape Hatteras near Charleston, South Carolina on September 10, 1952. Foundation Star was owned by Foundation Shipping Corporation which had purchased the ship early in the year from Vatis J. & A.T. The Foundation Star was built by Craig, Taylor & Co. Ltd. in Stockton-on-Tees, England in 1916 as the RFA Laurelleaf for the British Government. RFA Laurelleaf operated as a fleet oiler for the Royal Fleet Auxiliary during World War I. After the war she became a Mercantile Fleet Auxiliaries ship. Under construction, Laurelleaf' name was Olalla. Foundation Star broke in two at 34.616667°N 75.283333°W in a sea storm, while traveling with a cargo of molasses from Vera Cruz to Philadelphia.

- Ship history:
  - RFA Olalla during construction in 1916, built by Craig, Taylor & Co. Ltd.
  - RFA Laurelleaf Royal Fleet Auxiliary 1916 to 1919, operated by Lane & Macandrew of London.
  - SS Lampas owned by Anglo-Saxon Petroleum/Shell oil 1919 to 1927 (renamed in 1922)
  - SS Lampas owned by Petroleum Maatschappij La Corona N. V. of the Netherlands 1927 to 1928
  - SS Lampas owned by D/SA/S Stokke (Niels Christian Evensen) of Norway 1928 to 1939
  - SS Loida owned by Compañía Marítima Atlántica Ltda. (J. & AT Vatis, Piraeus) of Panama 1939 to 1952
  - SS Foundation Star owned by Foundation Shipping Corporation of Honduras, operated by Seiling & Jarvis, 1952
  - Broke in two September 10, 1952
- General characteristics:
  - Gros Tonnage 5.631 grt
  - Net Tonnage 2,965 tons
  - Deadweight 8,300 tons (1016 kg)
  - Length: 177 metres (581 ft)
  - Bean: 15.7 metres (52 ft)
  - Draft: 9.8 metres (32 ft)
  - Top speed 9 knots
  - Built in yard no.: 171
  - Engine by Blair & Co. Ltd.
    - 1 × 3 cylinder triple expansion steam engine
    - One shaft
    - Power 451 Nhp

== See also ==
- World War II United States Merchant Navy
