= West Ice =

Area of the Greenland Sea

Coordinates: 71°N 15°W

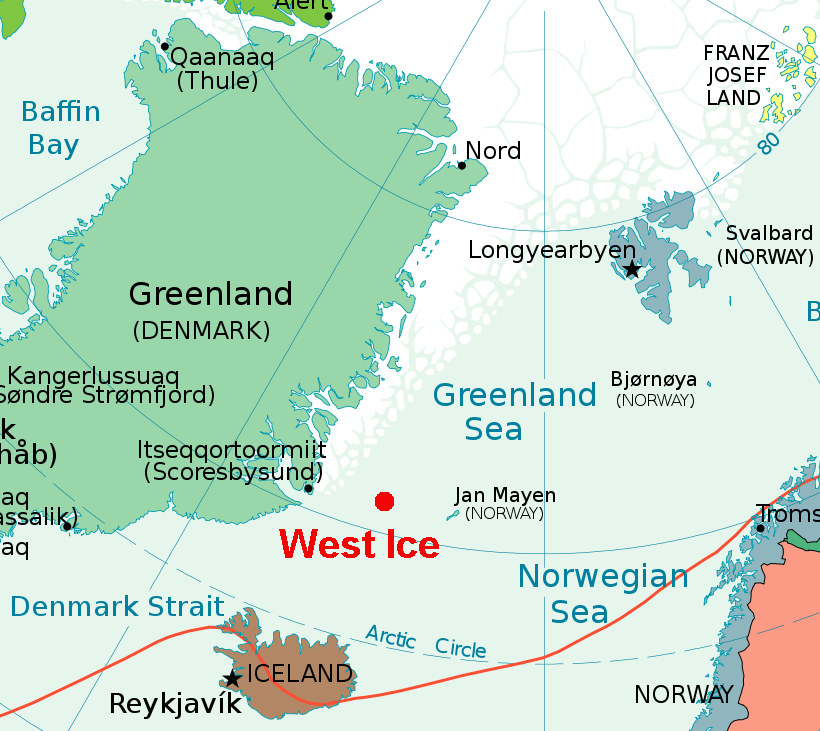

Average annual catches of harp seal and hooded seal in the West Ice.
Year	Harp seal			Hooded seal
Year	Pups	1+ yo	total	total
1946–50	26,606	9,466	36,070	41,409
1951–60	25,250	8,266	33,506	46,328
1961–70	17,524	3,365	20,889	39,146
1971–80	11,543	1,744	13,287	19,863
1981–90	5,095	3,394	8,489	3,791
1991–95	281	6,968	7,249	3,479
1996–00	3,251	1,473	4,724	

The West Ice (Norwegian: Vestisen, or Vesterisen, Danish: see below) is a patch of the Greenland Sea covered by pack ice during winter time. It is located north of Iceland, between East Greenland and Jan Mayen island. In Greenland and the Danish language, vestisen refers to the sea ice-covered waters off Greenland's west coast.

== West Ice in the Greenland Sea ==
The West Ice is a major breeding ground for seals, especially harp seals and hooded seals. It was discovered in the early 18th century by British whalers. At the time, whalers were not interested in seal hunting as long as there was ample stock of bowhead whales in the area. However, after the 1750s, the whale population had been depleted in the area, and systematic seal hunting started, first by British ships and then by German, Dutch, Danish, Norwegian, and Russian ships. The annual catches were 120,000 animals around 1900, mostly by Norway and Russia, and rose to 350,000 by the 1920s. They then declined, first because of imposed restrictions on total allowable catch and then in response to decreasing market demand. Nevertheless, the seal population in the West Ice was rapidly falling, from an estimated 1,000,000 in 1956 to 100,000 in the 1980s. In the 1980s–1990s, takings of harp seals totaled 8,000–10,000, and annual catches of hooded seals totaled a few thousand between 1997 and 2001. Norway accounts for all recent seal hunting in the West Ice, as Russia has not hunted hooded seals since 1995, and catches harp seals at the East Ice in the White Sea – Barents Sea.

Seal hunting in the West Ice was a dangerous occupation, as floating ice, storms and winds posed constant threat to the ships; in the 19th century, the hunters often encountered frozen human bodies on the West Ice. A major accident occurred around 5 April 1952 when a sudden storm surprised 53 ships hunting in the area. Seven of them sank and five vanished, namely Ringsel, Brattind and Vårglimt from Troms and Buskøy and Pels from Sunnmøre, with 79 men on board. The search for them involved ships and planes and continued for many days, but no trace of the missing boats was found.

The word "West" contrasts with the East Ice (Østisen), which refers to the ice-covered waters east and south of Svalbard, including Barents Sea and White Sea.

== West Ice in the Baffin Bay ==
The word vestisen ("the west ice") in a Greenland-specific context in the Danish language refers to the sea ice off Greenland's west coast in the Davis Strait and Baffin Bay. This could cause confusion when comparing or translating Danish and Norwegian sources. The band of sea ice in the East Greenland Current is referred to as Storisen, which translates as The Large or Grand Ice, in reference to the density of multi-year sea ice and icebergs. The Storisen is a band of ice rather than a specific area, typically spanning the entire east coast and around Cape Farewell. The word East Ice is occasionally used to more generally refer to all sea ice waters off the east coast, which thus includes the patch that in Norwegian and English is named West Ice.
