= West Ice accidents =

1952 maritime incident in the Greenland Sea

Coordinates: 71°N 15°W

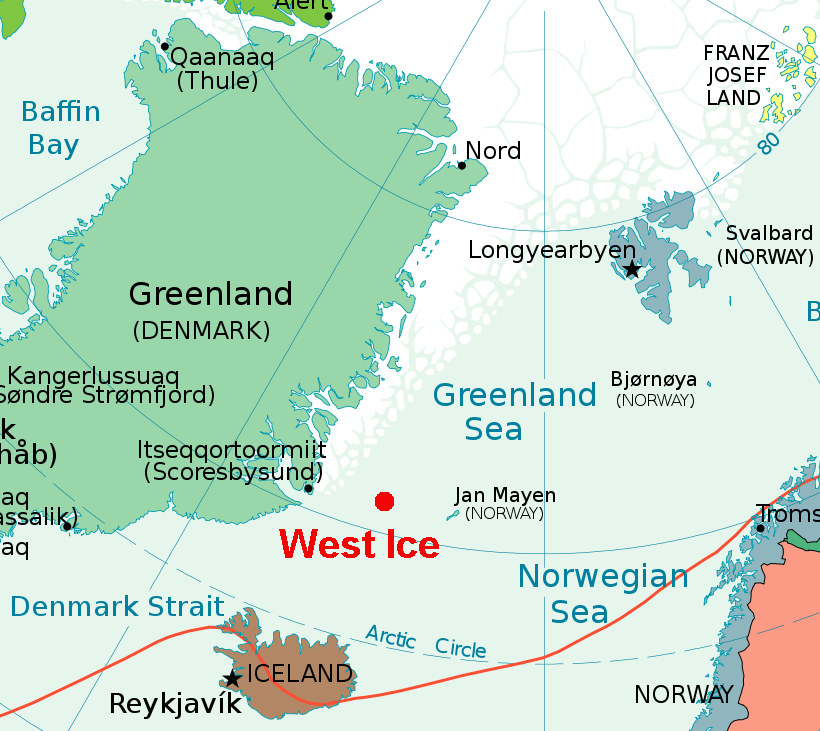
West Ice Pack in the Greenland Sea

The West Ice accidents (Ulykkene i Vestisen) occurred around 5 April 1952 when the five Norwegian seal hunting vessels Ringsel, Brattind and Vårglim from Troms and Buskøy and Pels from Sunnmøre with a total crew of 78 men vanished in the midst of a severe storm in the area of the West Ice in the Greenland Sea east of Greenland.

Despite search and rescue operations for many days involving planes and naval ships, no traces of the missing boats were discovered. During Easter that year 53 Norwegian vessels were participating in seal hunting in the West Ice Pack. Of these 7 shipwrecked, 5 disappeared without a trace. The first vessel to shipwreck was the Møre boat "Vestis", however the crew of this boat was rescued.

== Related reading ==
- Aagaard, Asbjørn T. (1995) Vesterisen 1952, (diary notes published by Hilde Aagaard) ISBN 82-993655-0-3
- Farstad, Arnold (2001) Mysteriet i Vestisen: selfangsttragedien som lamslo nasjonen (Samlaget) ISBN 82-521-5849-8
- Mowat, Farley (2004) Sea of slaughter (Stackpole Books) ISBN 0-8117-3169-3
