= SS Derwentfield =

Tanker ship

History
- Name: Empire Coral (1941-46); Derwent River (1946-47); Derwentfield (1947-53)
- Owner: Ministry of War Transport (1941-45); Ministry of Transport (1945-46); British Empire Steam Navigation Co Ltd (1946-47); Northern Petroleum Tankship Co Ltd (1947-52); Compagnia Globo de Navigazione SA (1952-53)
- Operator: Eagle Oil & Shipping Co. Ltd. (1941-45); Furness, Withy & Co Ltd (1945-46); Hunting & Son Ltd (1946-52)
- Port of registry: (United Kingdom) Sunderland (1941-45); United Kingdom (1945-52); Panama City (1952-53)
- Builder: Sir J Laing & Sons Ltd
- Cost: £255,000
- Launched: 11 February 1941
- Completed: April 1941
- Out of service: 1 September 1952
- Identification: Code Letters BCJG (1941-52); United Kingdom Official Number 168669 (1941-52)
- Fate: Scrapped

General characteristics
- Class & type: Tanker
- Tonnage: 8,602 GRT; 4,837 NRT; 12,500 DWT
- Length: 474 ft 6 in (144.63 m)
- Beam: 62 ft 1 in (18.92 m)
- Draught: 27 ft 9 in (8.46 m)
- Depth: 33 ft 8 in (10.26 m)
- Installed power: Triple expansion steam engine
- Propulsion: Screw propeller

Derwentfield was an 8,602 GRT tanker that was built as Empire Coral in 1941 by Sir J Laing & Sons Ltd, Sunderland, United Kingdom. She was built for the Ministry of War Transport (MoWT). In 1946, she was sold into merchant service and renamed Derwent River. Another sale in 1947 saw her renamed Derwentfield. She served until 1952 when she was severely damaged by an explosion and subsequent fire. In 1953, she was declared a constructive total loss and scrapped.

== Description ==
The ship was built in 1941 by Sir J Laing & Sons Ltd., Sunderland. She was launched on 11 February 1941 and completed in April.

The ship was 474 feet 6 inches (144.63 m) long, with a beam of 62 feet 1 inch (18.92 m). She had a depth of 33 feet 2 inches (10.11 m) and a draught of 27 feet 9 inches (8.46 m). She was assessed at 8,602 GRT, 4,837 NRT. Her deadweight tonnage was 12,500.

The ship was propelled by a triple expansion steam engine, which had cylinders of 27 inches (69 cm), 44 inches (110 cm) and 76 inches (190 cm) diameter by 51 inches (130 cm) stroke. The engine was built by North East Marine Engine Co (1938) Ltd, Newcastle upon Tyne.

== History ==
=== War service ===
Empire Coral was built for the MoWT at a cost of £255,000. She was placed under the management of Eagle Oil and Shipping Company Ltd. Her port of registry was Sunderland. The Code Letters BCJG and United Kingdom Official Number 168669 were allocated.

Empire Coral was completed in April 1941, she arrived at Methil, Fife on 3 May. She departed Methil on 7 May as a member of Convoy EC 16, arriving at Loch Ewe the next day. a member of Convoy OB 320, which departed from Liverpool on 8 May 1941 and dispersed at sea on 14 May. She was bound for Curaçao, where she arrived on 2 June. Empire Coral departed Curaçao on 9 June bound for Halifax, Nova Scotia, arriving there on 19 June. Empire Coral was due to depart Halifax as a member of Convoy HX 134, bound for the Stanlow Refinery, Cheshire. She did not join HX 134, but departed Halifax on 26 June as a member of Convoy HX 135. Empire Coral was carrying a cargo of petrol. The convoy arrived at Liverpool on 12 July.

Empire Coral was a member of Convoy ON 2, which departed Liverpool on 27 July 1941 and Loch Ewe on 30 July. The convoy dispersed at sea on 8 August. She arrived at Baton Rouge, Louisiana on 19 August and departed the next day for Halifax, where she arrived on 28 August. Empire Coral was a member of Convoy HX 147, which departed Halifax on 29 August 1941 and arrived at Liverpool on 12 September. She was carrying a cargo of aviation fuel. Empire Coral arrived at the Belfast Lough on 12 September. The next day, she joined the unescorted Convoy BB 75, which arrived at Milford Haven. Pembrokeshire on 14 September. She departed Milford Haven that day as a member of Convoy WP 35, arriving at Southampton on 17 September. Empire Coral was the only member of Convoy PW 32, which departed from Portsmouth on 21 September 1941 and arrived at Milford Haven on 23 September. She ran aground at Spithead before sailing. During the voyage she put into Dartmouth, Devon and Falmouth, Cornwall.

Empire Coral was a member of Convoy ON 21, which departed Liverpool on 28 September 1941 and dispersed at sea on 14 October. She was bound for New York, where she arrived on 18 October. Empire Coral departed New york on 14 November bound for Aruba, Netherlands Antilles, where she arrived on 21 November. She departed Aruba on 23 November for Halifax, arriving there on 1 December. Empire Coral was a member of Convoy HX 163, which departed Halifax on 3 December 1941 and arrived at Liverpool on 19 December. She was carrying a cargo of paraffin and petrol. Empire Coral arrived at the Belfast Lough on 19 December and then sailed to Dublin Ireland, arriving the next day.

Empire Coral departed Dublin on 2 January 1942 bound for the Belfast Lough, from where she joined Convoy ON 54, which departed Liverpool on 6 January 1942 and dispersed at sea on 17 January. She was bound for Corpus Christi. She arrived at Corpus Christi, Texas on 2 February. She departed Corpus Christi on 5 February bound for Halifax, where she arrived on 20 February. Empire Coral was a member of Convoy HX 177, which departed Halifax on 25 February 1942 and arrived at Liverpool on 9 March. She was carrying a cargo of petrol. Empire Coral was a member of Convoy ON 77, which departed Liverpool on 17 March 1942 and dispersed at sea on 28 March.

Empire Coral was a member of Convoy ON 91, which departed Liverpool on 1 May 1942 and dispersed at sea on 15 May. She was bound for Baytown, Texas. She arrived at New York on 17 May, then made two return trips to Philadelphia, Pennsylvania, finally arriving back at New York on 27 May. She then sailed to Boston, Massachusetts. Empire Coral departed Boston on 29 May as a member of Convoy BX 21, which arrived at Halifax on 31 May. She then departed Halifax as a member of Convoy HX 192, which arrived at Liverpool on 11 June. Empire Coral was carrying a cargo of aviation fuel and was the last ship in the convoy to depart Halifax. She arrived at the Belfast Lough on 10 June, from where she joined Convoy BB 185 the next day. The convoy was bound for Milford Haven, where it arrived on 12 June, Empire Coral arrived at Avonmouth, Somerset on 12 June. She departed Avonmouth on 6 July and arrived at Milford Haven on 8 July. She then sailed to Liverpool and joined Convoy ON 111, which dispersed at sea on 24 July. Empire Coral arrived at New York on 25 July. She departed on 27 July bound for the Hampton Roads. She departed the Hampton Roads on 31 July as a member of Convoy KS 526, which arrived at Key West, Florida on 8 August. She then made a return voyage to Galveston, Texas, arriving back at Key West on 22 August. Empire Coral joined Convoy KN 133, which departed Key West on 23 August and arrived at the Hampton Roads on 29 August. She departed New York the next day bound for Cape Cod Bay, from where she departed on 2 September, joining Convoy BX 36, which departed Boston that day and arrived at Halifax on 4 September. Empire Coral was a member of Convoy HX 206, which departed Halifax on 6 September 1942 and arrived at Liverpool on 18 September. She was carrying gas oil bound for Manchester, Lancashire.

Empire Coral was a member of Convoy ON 133, which departed Liverpool on 25 September 1942 and arrived at New York on 11 October. She departed New York on 13 October as a member of Convoy NK 506, which arrived at Key West on 20 October. She then joined Convoy KH 412, which arrived at Galveston on 24 October. Empire Coral arrived at Pilottown, Louisiana on 22 October. She then sailed to New Orleans, Louisiana from where she departed on 31 October bound for Cristóbal, Dominican Republic, where she arrived on 5 November. She then sailed to Balboa, Colombia, from where she departed on 6 November bound for Cape Town, South Africa, arriving on 8 December.

Empire Coral departed Cape Town on 10 December as a member of Convoy CA 3, which dispersed at sea on 12 December. She arrived at Aden on 29 December, departing the same day for Suez, Egypt, where she arrived on 4 January 1943. She departed Suez on 11 January bound for Massawa, Ethiopia arriving on 15 January. Empire Coral departed Massawa on 18 January and arrived back at Aden on 20 January. She then joined Convoy AP 14, which departed Aden on 22 January and arrived at Bandar-Abbas, Iran on 28 January. She departed Bandar-Abbas that day and arrived at Bahrain on 30 January. Empire Coral departed Bahrain on 11 February as a member of Convoy PA 24, which arrived at Aden on 19 February. She departed Aden that day for Suez, arriving on 25 February. Empire Coral departed Suez on 4 March bound for Massawa, arriving on 8 March, she sailed from there on 10 March and arrived at Aden on 12 March. Empire Coral was a member of Convoy AP 24, which departed Aden on 13 March and arrived at Bandar-Abbas on 19 March. From Bandar-Abbas, she made a return voyage to Abadan, Iran. Empire Coral was a member of Convoy PA 31, which departed Bandar-Abbas on 29 March and arrived at Aden on 6 April. She departed Aden that day for Suez, where she arrived on 12 April.

Empire Coral departed Suez on 19 April bound for Aden, where she arrived on 25 April, departing for Abadan that day and arriving on 3 May. She departed Abadan on 5 May, bound for Bandar-Abbas. Empire Coral was a member of Convoy PB 40, which departed Bandar-Abbas on 12 May and arrived at Bombay, India on 18 May. She departed Bombay on 20 June bound for Abadan, from where she departed on 2 July bound for Khasab Bay, Oman. Empire Coral was a member of Convoy PA 44, which departed Khasab Bay on 4 July and arrived at Aden on 13 July. She departed the same day and arrived at Suez on 18 July. From Suez, she sailed to Port Said, Egypt. On 22 July, Empire Coral departed Port Said bound for Alexandria, Egypt, arriving the next day. She departed Alexandria on 29 July bound for Haifa, Palestine, where she arrived on 31 July. From Haifa, she sailed to Tripoli, Lebanon, arriving on 4 August. Empire Coral departed Tripoli on 9 August bound for Haifa, where she arrived on 21 August. She departed Haifa on 27 August and arrived back there on 8 September, departing on 11 September for Alexandria, where she arrived on 13 September.

Empire Coral was a member of Convoy MKS 25, which departed Alexandria on 14 September 1943 and arrived at Gibraltar on 25 September. She left the convoy at Malta, where she arrived on 19 September. Empire Coral sailed from Malta on 4 October, bound for Syracuse, Italy, where she arrived on 5 October. She departed Syracuse on 10 October bound for Taranto, Italy. On 23 October, Empire Coral joined Convoy HA 5, which departed Bari, Italy on 21 October and arrived at Augusta, Italy on 24 October. She then joined Convoy UGS20, which had departed the Hampton Roads on 5 October and arrived at Port Said on 1 November. She then sailed to Suez, from where she departed on 4 November for Aden, arriving on 9 November. Empire Coral was a member of Convoy AP 53, which departed Aden on 19 November and arrived at Bandar-Abbas on 26 November. She departed Bandar-Abbas that day and arrived at Abadan on 28 November, departing from there for Bandar-Abbas on 1 December. Empire Coral was a member of Convoy PA 64, which departed Bandar-Abbas on 11 December and arrived at Aden on 18 December. She departed Aden that day and arrived at Suez on 24 December.

On 2 January, Empire Coral departed Suez for Aden, arriving on 7 January. She departed Aden on 13 January as part of Convoy AP 58, which dispersed at sea on 20 January. She arrived at Shatt al-Arab, Iran on 22 January. From there, she sailed to Abadan, from where she departed on 4 February bound for Bombay, arriving on 11 February. Empire Coral was a member of Convoy BM 86, which departed Bombay on 16 February and arrived at Colombo, Ceylon on 21 February. She then joined Convoy JC 38, which departed Colombo on 22 February and arrived at Calcutta, India on 29 February. Empire Coral was bound for Madras, India, where she arrived on 25 February. She departed Madras on 5 March, joining Convoy JC 39, which departed Colombo on 1 March and arrived at Calcutta on 9 March.

Empire Coral was a member of Convoy CJ 25, which departed Calcutta on 24 April and arrived at Colombo on 2 May. She then joined Convoy JC 47, which departed Colombo on 4 May and arrived at Calcutta on 11 May. Empire Coral was bound for Trincomalee, Ceylon, where she arrived on 6 May. From 13 May 1944 to 11 January 1945, Empire Coral made a number of journeys between Colombo and Trincomalee or vice versa.

Empire Coral departed Colombo on 10 February 1944 bound for Bombay, where she arrived on 14 February. She departed Bombay on 3 April and arrived back there on 8 April. Empire Coral departed Bombay on 4 May 1945 bound for Abadan, where she arrived on 11 May. She departed Abadan on 15 May bound for Colombo, arriving on 26 May. Empire Coral departed Colombo on 31 May, bound for Trincomalee, arriving on 2 June. On 4 June, Empire Coral departed Trincomalee for Colombo, arriving on 6 June. She departed Colombo on 19 August, bound for Durban, South Africa, where she arrived on 7 September.

=== Post-war service ===
In 1946, Empire Coral was sold to the British Empire Steam Navigation Co Ltd and was renamed Derwent River. She was operated under the management of Furness, Withy & Co Lts. In 1947, she was sold to the Northern Petroleum Co Ltd, renamed Derwentfield and placed under the management of Hunting & Son Ltd. On 1 September 1952, Derwentfield was undergoing tank cleaning at Balik Papan, Borneo when there was an explosion and a subsequent fire. The ship was abandoned on 16 September as a constructive total loss. In 1953, she was refloated and sold to the Compagnia Globo de Navigazione SA, Panama. She arrived at Osaka, Japan on 15 May 1953 where it was intended to repair her but she was found to be beyond economic repair. Derwentfield was beached in the Kitzu River, Osaka. Scrapping commenced on 21 August 1953.
