= Perl Island =

Alaskan island

Coordinates: 59.115°N 151.681°W

Perl Island, also known as Pearl Island, is a mountainous island off the Kenai Peninsula coast of Alaska. One of the Chugach Islands, it is about 2.5 miles (4.0 km) long and 1.75 miles (2.82 km) wide. It is named for Perl D. Blodgett, a 19th-century settler in Kodiak.

On May 3, 2010, the United States Coast Guard Cutter Roanoke Island rescued the fishing boat Wahoo south of Perl Island.
