= Sinking of the Niš =

1952 maritime incident on the Danube river

- Date: 9 September 1952
- Time: 13:12 – 13:15
- Location: Confluence of the Danube and Sava rivers, Belgrade, Federal People's Republic of Yugoslavia
- Cause: Freak storm
- Deaths: >127
- Suspects: Ferdinand Nobilo, the captain
- Charges: Ultimately none
- Verdict: vis major
- Convictions: None

The Yugoslav river ferry Niš (Serbian Cyrillic: Ниш) sank as the result of a freak storm at the confluence of the Danube and Sava rivers in Belgrade on 9 September 1952. At least 127 people were killed, but the exact number of fatalities remains unknown. It was the deadliest shipwreck in Serbia's history, either military or civilian, and the deadliest river accident in the history of Yugoslavia. It has been dubbed the "Danubian Titanic".

== Introduction ==
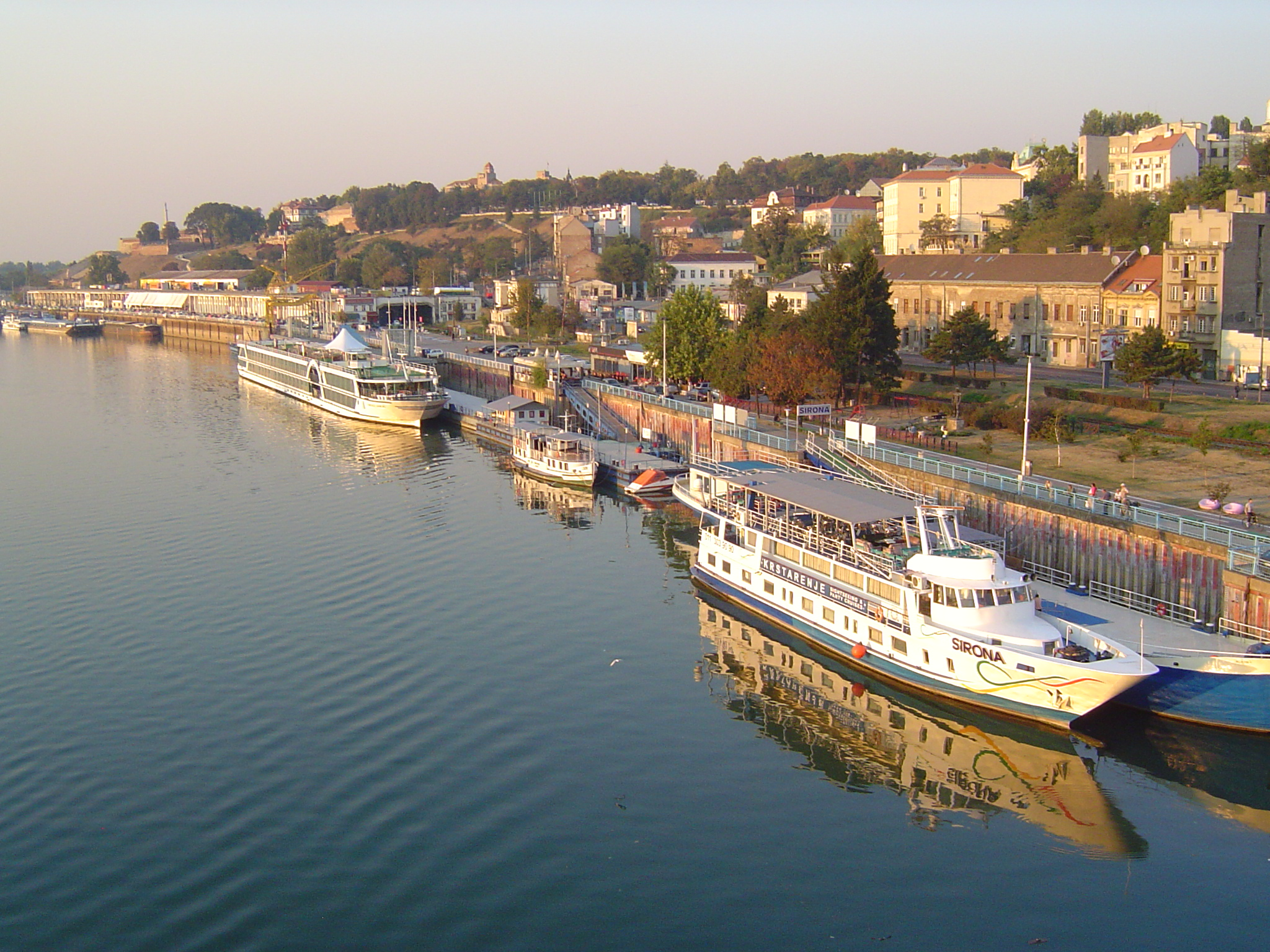
Sava port in 2009. It was the starting point of the Belgrade-Zemun ferry line back in 1952

The passenger ferries Zagreb and Niš operated on the ferry line Zemun-Belgrade, across the Danube and Sava rivers. As Belgrade had no motorway bridges across the Sava at that time, the line was basically part of the urban city transport. It usually took 20 minutes to reach the other port. In 1952 the construction of the Branko's Bridge, on the pillars of the pre-World War II King Alexander Bridge which was destroyed, was underway. It was open for the pedestrians, though, but on 9 September 1952, it was closed even for them, due to some works. This resulted in major crowds on the Sava Port that day.

Both ferries were designed for 60 passengers, but they regularly transported twice larger number of people. The Niš was scheduled to go to the Zemun port at 13:30. Captain of the ship, Ferdinand Nobilo, seeing that the deck was already crowded with passengers, asked the permission from the port authority to sail out earlier. He was given a go so the ship sailed out on 13:07.

== Disaster ==
The day was sunny and warm. After noon, the clouds began to amass over the Zemun area, but neither the crew nor the clerks at the port authority were worried about it. When leaving the dock, the ship scratched a bit on it. Soon, an unusual weather phenomenon began to develop. All of a sudden, there was a severe fall of the temperature, the fog engulfed the rivers and the shower started while the winds began blowing up to 130 km/h (81 mph). The passengers who were on the deck, cramped belowdecks to protect themselves from the storm. The thunders were so loud that it appeared as bomb detonations.

Captain Nobilo ordered Jovan Gvozdić, the helmsman, to take the ferry closer to the bank, but it was too late for maneuvering. A massive wave slammed to door of the passenger compartment, opening them. At 13:12, the side blow of the hurricane-strong wind tipped the ship on its side. Passengers ran to the opposite side, but they began to slide and fall down in an effort to climb the benches or exit through the ventilation holes. The water poured inside and those who were belowdecks remained trapped. The crew members, including captain Nobilo and engine operator Dušan Jovanović, began smashing the windows and breaking the hull plates in order to make holes for escaping the entombing ship. They broke the doors of the compartments, dragging passengers out. They were also breaking and cracking wooden beams and planks from the ship's interior, throwing them into the water so that survivors would have something to hang on to. The passengers were overwhelmed by the panic.

The fog was so heavy, that the ship was barely visible from the bank, even though it wasn't far away from it. Siren from the ship was heard at one moment with speedy but irregular sound, signaling for help, but it soon stopped. At 13:15, after only 3 minutes since the storm hit it and 8 minutes since it sailed out, the ferry completely sank to the bottom of the riverbed, 14 m (46 ft) deep. It sank on the location between the Nebojša Tower and the Great War Island. According to the eyewitnesses, the "desperate screams" were heard coming from the river.

Those who managed to escape to the surface of the water, were battered by the storm. The hail began to fall with the hailstones the size of a chicken egg. It literally smashed heads of the survivors, who would turn unconscious and then taken away and drowned by the strong waves. Survivors stated that people would scream and just disappear below the water after being hit. The others ended up being severely bruised. Almost at instant, just like it started, the storm stopped and the sun appeared.

== Rescue operation ==
"At 13:12, a sudden and very strong bura tipped over the ship Niš, which regularly travels on the Belgrade-Zemun line. This ship sailed out from Belgrade at 13:07. The ship immediately sank to the bottom of the river. 30 persons saved themselves, and it is believed that around ninety people drowned, mostly inside the ship. Ten boats from the bank immediately came to help, but they could only aid those who managed to jump out of the ship"
Official statement by the Ministry of the interior of People's Republic of Serbia, 9 September 1952

Even during the storm, local boatmen with their small boats and dinghies came to the rescue, but were hindered by the weather. Medical crews from the Military Medical Academy arrived only at 15:00, so as Aleksandar Ranković and Slobodan Penezić Krcun, ministers of the interior of Yugoslavia and Serbia, respectively, and Serbian minister Jovan Veselinov. Ten boats sailed out while some of the boat owners on the bank in front of the Nebojša Tower were throwing cables and grapnels into the water, dragging out the survivors who would grab on the cords. As some boatmen lived on the bank, their family members were the first to take in the survivors, trying to keep them warm. A group of soldiers also helped taking the survivors ashore.

In the afternoon, the salvage operation began. Diver Bogoljub Perić was the first to examine the wreck at the bottom of the river. In one of the two passenger compartments he counted 56 bodies. They included one crew member who was still grasping onto the mast, and seven children. By 7:30 on the morning of 10 September, all the bodies that were inside the ship had been retrieved. Niš was lifted from the riverbed by the Soča floating elevator, which dragged it to shore. The lifting of the ship was hampered with various difficulties, but the Soča finished the raising of the Niš at 04:00 on 11 September. The ship was in an upward position, as if it was still sailing, and had not sustained much damage.

== Fatalities ==
The police initially reported 90 dead. This figure included three of the six crew members. Over the coming days, the bodies of the drowned passengers were retrieved from multiple locations downstream of the Danube: the Pančevo Bridge, river banks at Vinča, Ritopek, and so on. The number of dead bodies that were recovered ultimately grew to 126 or 127, however the exact number is still unknown.

The number of boarded passengers was unknown to begin with. The Niš had the capacity to carry 60 passengers, but for that specific ride 106 tickets were sold. However, in addition to this number, there were the passengers who had daily and monthly tickets, and children and pupils who didn't pay for the ticket at all. In addition, 30 passengers and crew members survived the sinking, which mean there were some 160 passengers on board. Witnesses at the Nebojša Tower estimated that they observed some 60 "heads" in the water, meaning that at least half of them still didn't survive, despite reaching the surface of the water.

== Investigation ==
Captain Nobilo survived the accident. Due to the conflicting statements from the survivors, he spent some time in custody, but was let go and was never charged. Nobilo stated that he asked the permission to sail out earlier because the ship was already overcrowded while people kept arriving to the port wanting to board, and that he was given the permission from the port authority. He added that all the attempts to place the bow against the wind failed once the ship abruptly leaned on the starboard side. The wind was stronger than the stern and the ship sank in several moments.

A state commission was formed to investigate the matter. The commission concluded that the sudden surge of the hurricane-strong wind was the only cause of the tragedy and that no individual should be blamed. It was an unusual conclusion: in an atheist, Communist country, force majeure was blamed.

Experts later stated that there was a fatal circumstance which aggravated the situation and accelerated the demise of the ship. Just few days before the shipwreck, Yugoslav River Shipping Company modernized the ferry. The bulky and heavy steam engine was replaced with the much lighter diesel one. That way, instead of 2 t (2.0 long tons; 2.2 short tons) of coal, the ferry was loaded with only 100 L (22 imp gal; 26 US gal) of diesel fuel. This caused a major imbalance and allowed for the ship to tip over so easily. The commission didn't discuss this possibility. Another possible reason was a fact that the river was dredged recently, which deepened the riverbed, allowing the creation of vortex.

== Meteorology ==
The freak storm like this was not recorded in Belgrade. It was so concentrated on the rivers, as opposed to the land, that many Belgraders didn't believe at first that a disaster of this magnitude happened, thinking that the reports are exaggerated. It set the record when it comes to the precipitation in these areas. Pluviograph showed that in the period of 20 minutes surrounding the sinking of the Niš, 80 mm (3.1 in) of rain fell or 4 mm (0.16 in) in a minute, which is a very rare high average even for the much shorter periods of a few minutes, let alone for the entire 20 minutes. An average precipitation amount for the entire month of September in Belgrade is 55.3 mm (2.18 in).

== Aftermath ==
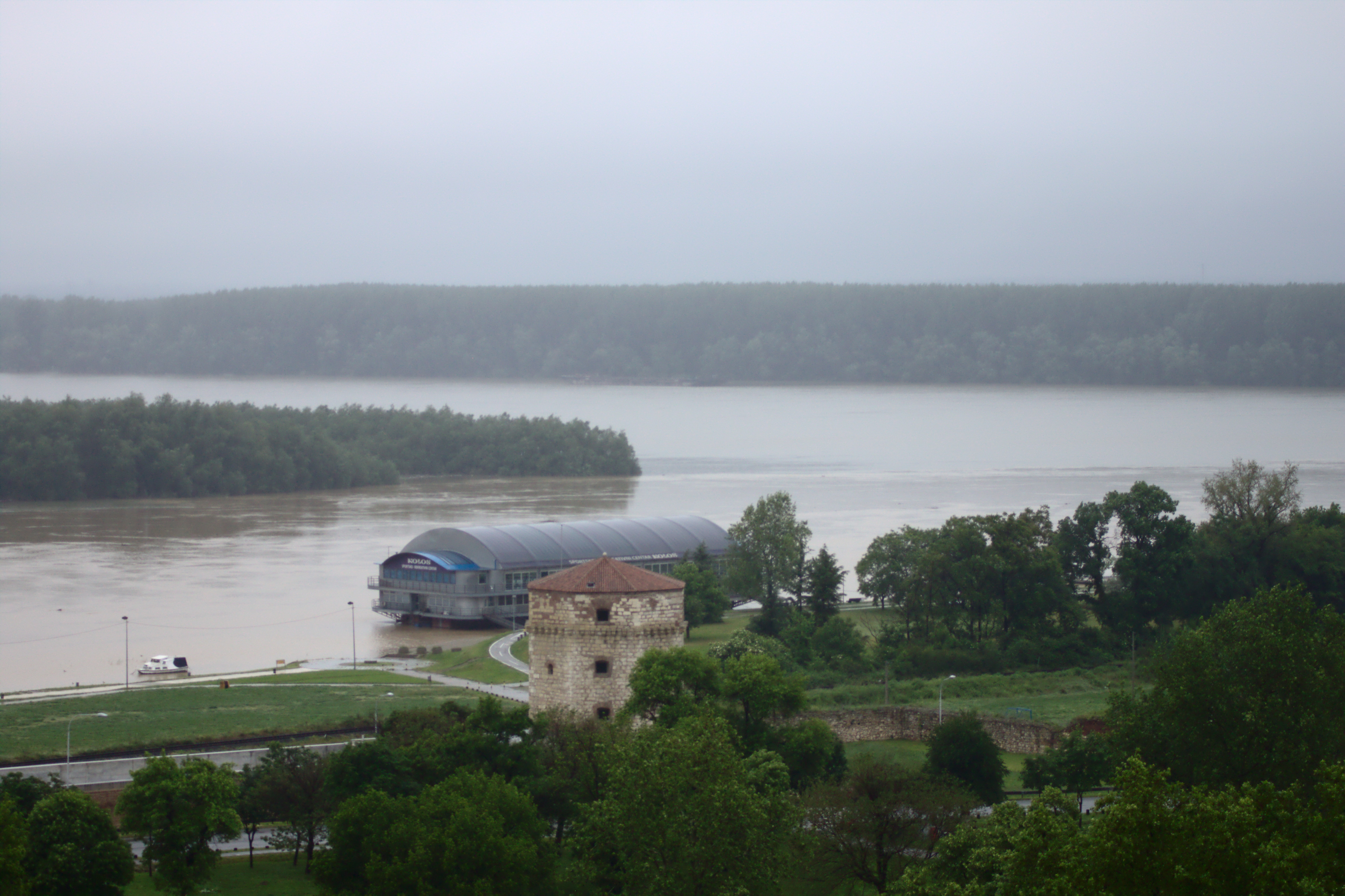
View from the Belgrade Fortress on the mouth of the Sava into the Danube. The Niš sank between the Nebojša Tower (center of the photo) and the Great War Island (central-left green tip)

News about the disaster were internationally reported. The government of Yugoslavia declared three days of national mourning and promised state help for the children who lost parents and families who lost breadwinners. The State Insurance Institution announced that all passengers were insured and that for each dead they will pay 50,000 dinars and for survived but left with full disability, 100,000 dinars.

The only two daily newspapers in Belgrade at the time, Politika and Borba, reported on the disaster but did not publish the news on their front pages, likely because the disaster coincided with the tenth anniversary of the establishment of the Yugoslav Navy. Nevertheless, the country's Communist government suppressed the news about the accident as much as possible, as the setbacks and failures were to be overlooked in general. Politika in its 10 September issue had a statement from captain Nobilo, while on 12 September, it published statements from the witnesses. Borba, in its 11 September issue, gave a detailed timetable of what happened after the sinking and the salvage mission which ensued. Over the next several days, reports of the accident were mixed with the "successes": lighting up of the coke furnaces in Lukavac, Bosnia and Herzegovina, establishing of the regular traffic on the Belgrade-Zagreb highway and even the "great philatelist exhibition in Belgrade".

As a result of such policy ("dictatorship of optimism"), the event initially spawned numerous conspiracy theories, but was ultimately largely forgotten. As of 2018, there is no memorial of any kind marking the event. Also, it didn't find its place in the art, except for the fictional 2014 novel Shipwreck (Brodolom) by Vlada Arsić.

Immediately after the accident, the stories began circulating through the city about what happened. The accent was especially on the weird circumstances of the storm, which above the land wasn't nearly as strong as it was above the rivers, either in Belgrade or Zemun. Enhanced by gossiping, it appeared that the "heavenly forces" struck only "the Niš and its passengers" and several urban myths about the fates of the passengers developed.

Stories from that period, some of which were published later in the newspapers as witness' statements, include the case of Dragoljub Jovanović from Zemun. He became father that morning and decided to go to Belgrade to buy some presents, but perished in return. Marija Dimitrijević was drowned with her two daughters, while the third survived as Dimitrijević left her with a friend in the Sava port, because the ferry was overcrowded. Ljubiša Petrović, though he couldn't swim, managed to float on the surface holding onto a plank and was rescued. A young mother who left the maternity hospital that morning, was found deep inside the ship clutching baby in her arms. Ana Bajzert, a worker in the "Sutjeska" textile factory, couldn't swim but the waves pushed her ashore alive while her 12-years old daughter drowned. A Yugoslav Air Force major reached the bank swimming with one hand, while holding someone else's child under his other arm believing he is saving his son, while his wife and son drowned inside the ship. One girl managed to swim to the bank and abruptly died at spot.

One of the survivors was a 17-year old Alenka Rančić, later a popular actress. With several other survivors, she participated in the commemoration in 2002, marking the 50th anniversary of the accident. They put flower garlands in the river, at the site of the accident.

== Later developments ==
Niš was repaired after the disaster and renamed Senta. For the next several years, it ferried the Smederevo–Kovin line, across the Danube, east of Belgrade. In the late 1970s, the ship was decommissioned and scrapped at Pančevo's Brodoremont shipyard.

One of the urban legends surrounding the ship itself is that, as of 2010, painted in black and with floats on sides, it still sailed as a passenger ferry, connecting Novi Sad's Štrand beach with Sremska Kamenica, across the Danube.
