= SS Arkaba =

History
- Name: Arcoona (1924-1925); Arkaba (1925-1954); William Charlick IV (1954-1959)
- Namesake: Arkaba - Aboriginal word for underground waters
- Owner: Adelaide Steamship Company, Sydney (1924-1952); William Charlick Ltd, Hong Kong (1953-1957); Indian & Pacific Ocean Merchants, Rabaul (1957-1959)
- Builder: William Beardmore & Company, Dalmuir, Scotland
- Yard number: 630
- Launched: 6 March 1924
- Fate: Scrapped at Hong Kong in 1959.

General characteristics
- Type: Cargo ship
- Tonnage: 4,214 GRT, 2,593 NRT
- Length: 341.6 feet (104.1 m)
- Beam: 47.2 feet (14.4 m)
- Draught: 30.3 feet (9.2 m)
- Propulsion: Triple expansion engine

SS Arkaba was a 4,214 gross register ton cargo vessel built by William Beardmore & Company, Dalmuir, Scotland for the Adelaide Steamship Company as Arcoona. She was renamed Arkaba in 1925. She was requisitioned by the Royal Australian Navy during World War II between 26 August and 31 October 1940, as a coal and stores carrier. She became stranded on a reef on 19 February 1952 off Port Lincoln, South Australia. She was sold and during being towed to Hong Kong, broke her towline in huge seas and floated at the mercy of the waves and current, until reattached to a tugboat. Refitted in Hong Kong and sold in 1954 to William Charlick Ltd, Hong Kong and renamed William Charlick IV, before being sold to Indian & Pacific Ocean Merchants, Rabaul in 1957.

== Fate ==
She was scrapped in Hong Kong in 1959.
