= List of ship launches in 1944 =

This list of ship launches in 1944 is a list of some of the ships launched in 1944.

== January ==
Date	Ship	Class / type	Builder	Location	Country	Notes
1 January	George G. Crawford	Liberty ship	J. A. Jones Construction Company	Brunswick, Georgia	United States	For War Shipping Administration.
2 January	TID 60	TID-class tug	Richard Dunston Ltd.	Thorne	United Kingdom	For the War Department.
2 January	William Glackens	Liberty ship	California Shipbuilding Corporation	Los Angeles, California	United States	For War Shipping Administration.
2 January	William Vaughn Moody	Liberty ship	Permanente Metals, #2 Yard	Richmond, California	United States	For War Shipping Administration.
4 January	Ben Robertson	Liberty ship	Southeastern Shipbuilding Corporation	Savannah, Georgia	United States	For War Shipping Administration.
4 January	Oliver Kelley	Liberty ship	Permanente Metals, #2 Yard	Richmond, California	United States	For War Shipping Administration.
5 January	Abram S. Hewitt	Liberty ship	Permanente Metals, #2 Yard	Richmond, California	United States	For War Shipping Administration.
5 January	Augustin Stahl	Liberty ship	California Shipbuilding Corporation	Los Angeles, California	United States	For War Shipping Administration.
5 January	Charles Goodnight	Liberty ship	Todd Houston Shipbuilding Corporation	Houston, Texas	United States	For War Shipping Administration.
5 January	Elwood Mead	Liberty ship	Oregon Shipbuilding Company	Portland, Oregon	United States	For War Shipping Administration.
5 January	Joseph E. Wing	Liberty ship	Permanente Metals, #1 Yard	Richmond, California	United States	For War Shipping Administration.
5 January	Russell Sage	Liberty ship	J. A. Jones Construction Company	Panama City, Florida	United States	For War Shipping Administration.
7 January	Julian W. Mack	Liberty ship	California Shipbuilding Corporation	Los Angeles, California	United States	For War Shipping Administration.
7 January	Leon Godchaux	Liberty ship	Delta Shipbuilding Company	New Orleans, Louisiana	United States	For War Shipping Administration.
7 January	Norman O. Pedrick	Liberty ship	Delta Shipbuilding Company	New Orleans, Louisiana	United States	For War Shipping Administration.
7 January	Sameveron	Liberty ship	Bethlehem-Fairfield Shipyards	Baltimore, Maryland	United States	For Ministry of War Transport.
7 January	Samuel V. Stewart	Liberty ship	Oregon Shipbuilding Company	Portland, Oregon	United States	For War Shipping Administration.
7 January	William Peffer	Liberty ship	Permanente Metals, #2 Yard	Richmond, California	United States	For War Shipping Administration.
8 January	Ada Rehan	Liberty ship	Permanente Metals, #2 Yard	Richmond, California	United States	For War Shipping Administration.
8 January	Andrew Briscoe	Liberty ship	Todd Houston Shipbuilding Corporation	Houston, Texas	United States	For War Shipping Administration.
8 January	Clarence H. Matson	Liberty ship	California Shipbuilding Corporation	Los Angeles, California	United States	For War Shipping Administration.
8 January	George T. Angell	Liberty ship	New England Shipbuilding Company	South Portland, Maine	United States	For War Shipping Administration.
8 January	Jean Louis	Liberty ship	Delta Shipbuilding Company	New Orleans, Louisiana	United States	For War Shipping Administration.
8 January	Samfeugh	Liberty ship	Bethlehem-Fairfield Shipyards	Baltimore, Maryland	United States	For Ministry of War Transport.
8 January	TID 61	TID-class tug	Richard Dunston Ltd.	Thorne	United Kingdom	For the United States Army.
9 January	VIC 40	VIC lighter	Richard Dunston Ltd.	Thorne	United Kingdom	For the Admiralty.
10 January	CHANT 53	CHANT	Furness Shipbuilding Co. Ltd.	Haverton Hill-on-Tees	United Kingdom	For Ministry of War Transport.
10 January	John W. Troy	Liberty ship	Oregon Shipbuilding Company	Portland, Oregon	United States	For War Shipping Administration.
10 January	Samtay	Liberty ship	Bethlehem-Fairfield Shipyards	Baltimore, Maryland	United States	For Ministry of War Transport.
10 January	Uriah M. Rose	Liberty ship	Permanente Metals, #2 Yard	Richmond, California	United States	For War Shipping Administration.
11 January	Harriet Monroe	Liberty ship	Permanente Metals, #1 Yard	Richmond, California	United States	For War Shipping Administration.
11 January	Pevensey Castle	Castle-class corvette	Harland & Wolff	Belfast	United Kingdom	For Royal Navy
11 January	Royal S. Copeland	Liberty ship	St. Johns River Shipbuilding Company	Jacksonville, Florida	United States	For War Shipping Administration.
12 January	John W. Burgess	Liberty ship	Permanente Metals, #2 Yard	Richmond, California	United States	For War Shipping Administration.
12 January	United Victory	Victory ship	Oregon Shipbuilding Company	Portland, Oregon	United States	For War Shipping Administration.
13 January	David B. Johnson	Liberty ship	J. A. Jones Construction Company	Brunswick, Georgia	United States	For War Shipping Administration.
13 January	Moses G. Farer	Liberty ship	Permanente Metals, #2 Yard	Richmond, California	United States	For War Shipping Administration.
13 January	Samearn	Liberty ship	New England Shipbuilding Company	South Portland, Maine	United States	For Ministry of War Transport.
13 January	Samythian	Liberty ship	New England Shipbuilding Company	South Portland, Maine	United States	For Ministry of War Transport.
13 January	Susan Colby	Liberty ship	New England Shipbuilding Company	South Portland, Maine	United States	For War Shipping Administration.
14 January	Frank J. Cuhel	Liberty ship	Permanente Metals, #1 Yard	Richmond, California	United States	For War Shipping Administration.
14 January	James A. Wilder	Liberty ship	California Shipbuilding Corporation	Los Angeles, California	United States	For War Shipping Administration.
14 January	John Einig	Liberty ship	St. Johns River Shipbuilding Company	Jacksonville, Florida	United States	For War Shipping Administration.
14 January	Mission Solano	T2 tanker	Marinship Corporation	Sausalito, California	United States	For United States Maritime Commission.
14 January	TID 62	TID-class tug	Richard Dunston Ltd.	Thorne	United Kingdom	For the Admiralty.
15 January	Alfred C. True	Liberty ship	Permanente Metals, #2 Yard	Richmond, California	United States	For War Shipping Administration.
15 January	Carole Lombard	Liberty ship	California Shipbuilding Corporation	Los Angeles, California	United States	For War Shipping Administration.
15 January	Fort Fetterman	T2 Tanker	Alabama Drydock and Shipbuilding Company	Mobile, Alabama	United States	For War Shipping Administration.
15 January	Samnid	Liberty ship	Bethlehem-Fairfield Shipyards	Baltimore, Maryland	United States	For Ministry of War Transport.
16 January	William B. Leeds	Liberty ship	Permanente Metals, #2 Yard	Richmond, California	United States	For War Shipping Administration.
17 January	Allen C. Balch	Liberty ship	California Shipbuilding Corporation	Los Angeles, California	United States	For War Shipping Administration.
17 January	Samouse	Liberty ship	Bethlehem-Fairfield Shipyards	Baltimore, Maryland	United States	For Ministry of War Transport.
17 January	William W. Loring	Liberty ship	J. A. Jones Construction Company	Panama City, Florida	United States	For War Shipping Administration.
18 January	Francisco Morazan	Liberty ship	Permanente Metals, #2 Yard	Richmond, California	United States	For War Shipping Administration.
18 January	Kattenturm	Hansa A type Cargo ship	Deutsche Werft	Hamburg	Germany	For Deutsche Dampfschiffahrts-Gesellschaft Hansa
18 January	Melville Jacoby	Liberty ship	Walsh-Kaiser Company	Providence, Rhode Island	United States	For War Shipping Administration.
18 January	Samuel T. Darling	Liberty ship	Southeastern Shipbuilding Corporation	Savannah, Georgia	United States	For War Shipping Administration.
18 January	TID 63	TID-class tug	Richard Dunston Ltd.	Thorne	United Kingdom	For the War Department.
18 January	William M. Eastland	Liberty ship	Todd Houston Shipbuilding Corporation	Houston, Texas	United States	For War Shipping Administration.
19 January	Daulton Mann	Liberty ship	Permanente Metals, #1 Yard	Richmond, California	United States	For War Shipping Administration.
19 January	Eloy Alfaro	Liberty ship	Bethlehem-Fairfield Shipyards	Baltimore, Maryland	United States	For War Shipping Administration.
19 January	Raymond T. Baker	Liberty ship	California Shipbuilding Corporation	Los Angeles, California	United States	For War Shipping Administration.
19 January	William D. Boyce	Liberty ship	Permanente Metals, #2 Yard	Richmond, California	United States	For War Shipping Administration.
20 January	Alexander Majors	Liberty ship	Permanente Metals, #1 Yard	Richmond, California	United States	For War Shipping Administration.
20 January	Parina	Cargo ship	Harland & Wolff	Belfast	United Kingdom	For Royal Mail Line.
20 January	Samchess	Liberty ship	Bethlehem-Fairfield Shipyards	Baltimore, Maryland	United States	For Ministry of War Transport.
21 January	A. B. Hammond	Liberty ship	California Shipbuilding Corporation	Los Angeles, California	United States	For War Shipping Administration.
21 January	Abigail S. Duniway	Liberty ship	Oregon Shipbuilding Company	Portland, Oregon	United States	For War Shipping Administration.
21 January	Howard E. Coffin	Liberty ship	J. A. Jones Construction Company	Brunswick, Georgia	United States	For War Shipping Administration.
21 January	John G. Tod	Liberty ship	Todd Houston Shipbuilding Corporation	Houston, Texas	United States	For War Shipping Administration.
21 January	Pendleton	T2 Tanker	Kaiser Shipyards	Portland, Oregon	United States	For War Shipping Administration.
21 January	Van Lear Vlack	Liberty ship	Bethlehem-Fairfield Shipyards	Baltimore, Maryland	United States	For War Shipping Administration.
21 January	W. B. Rodgers	Liberty ship	Permanente Metals, #2 Yard	Richmond, California	United States	For War Shipping Administration.
22 January	Carl B. Eielson	Liberty ship	Permanente Metals, #2 Yard	Richmond, California	United States	For War Shipping Administration.
22 January	Renald Fernald	Liberty ship	New England Shipbuilding Company	South Portland, Maine	United States	For War Shipping Administration.
22 January	Samesk	Liberty ship	Bethlehem-Fairfield Shipyards	Baltimore, Maryland	United States	For Ministry of War Transport.
22 January	Warren Stone	Liberty ship	Delta Shipbuilding Company	New Orleans, Louisiana	United States	For War Shipping Administration.
24 January	Hancock	Essex-class aircraft carrier	Fore River Shipyard	Quincy, Massachusetts	United States	For United States Navy
24 January	Alice H. Rice	Liberty ship	Permanente Metals, #2 Yard	Richmond, California	United States	For War Shipping Administration.
24 January	Arabistan	Cargo ship	William Doxford & Sons Ltd.	Pallion	United Kingdom	For Strick Line (1923) Ltd.
24 January	Benjamin Schlesinger	Liberty ship	Bethlehem-Fairfield Shipyards	Baltimore, Maryland	United States	For War Shipping Administration.
24 January	CHANT 54	CHANT	Furness Shipbuilding Co. Ltd.	Haverton Hill-on-Tees	United Kingdom	For Ministry of War Transport.
24 January	Elinor Wylie	Liberty ship	California Shipbuilding Corporation	Los Angeles, California	United States	For War Shipping Administration.
24 January	Empire MacDermott	MAC ship	William Denny & Bros. Ltd.	Dumbarton	United Kingdom	For Ministry of War Transport.
24 January	Meyer London	Liberty ship	Bethlehem-Fairfield Shipyards	Baltimore, Maryland	United States	For War Shipping Administration.
25 January	Demeterton	Cargo ship	Burntisland Shipbuilding Company	Burntisland	United Kingdom	For R. Chapman & Son.
25 January	Edward H. Crockett	Liberty ship	New England Shipbuilding Company	South Portland, Maine	United States	For War Shipping Administration.
25 January	Edward Lander	Liberty ship	Oregon Shipbuilding Company	Portland, Oregon	United States	For War Shipping Administration.
25 January	Empire Rangoon	Cargo ship	Harland & Wolff	Belfast	United Kingdom	For Ministry of War Transport.
25 January	TID 64	TID-class tug	Richard Dunston Ltd.	Thorne	United Kingdom	For the Admiralty.
26 January	China Victory	Victory ship	California Shipbuilding Corporation	Los Angeles, California	United States	For War Shipping Administration.
26 January	Four Lakes	T2 Tanker	Alabama Drydock and Shipbuilding Company	Mobile, Alabama	United States	For War Shipping Administration.
26 January	Elwood Haynes	Liberty ship	Permanente Metals, #2 Yard	Richmond, California	United States	For War Shipping Administration.
26 January	Indian City	Cargo ship	Bartram & Sons Ltd	Sunderland	United Kingdom	For Reardon Smith Line Ltd.
26 January	Isaac S. Hopkins	Liberty ship	Southeastern Shipbuilding Corporation	Savannah, Georgia	United States	For War Shipping Administration.
26 January	Empire Marksman	Coaster	Scott & Sons Ltd	Bowling	United Kingdom	For Ministry of War Transport
26 January	VIC 41	VIC lighter	Richard Dunston Ltd.	Thorne	United Kingdom	For Ministry of War Transport.
27 January	Empire Jonathan	Near-Warrior type tug	A. Hall & Co. Ltd.	Aberdeen	United Kingdom	For Ministry of War Transport.
27 January	Henry E. Huntington	Liberty ship	California Shipbuilding Corporation	Los Angeles, California	United States	For War Shipping Administration.
27 January	Morris Hillquit	Liberty ship	Bethlehem-Fairfield Shipyards	Baltimore, Maryland	United States	For War Shipping Administration.
27 January	Nathan S. Davis	Liberty ship	Permanente Metals, #2 Yard	Richmond, California	United States	For War Shipping Administration.
27 January	Poland Victory	Victory ship	Oregon Shipbuilding Company	Portland, Oregon	United States	For War Shipping Administration.
27 January	Empire Jonathan	Tug	A Hall & Co Ltd	Aberdeen	United Kingdom	For Ministry of War Transport
28 January	Charles J. Finger	Liberty ship	Todd Houston Shipbuilding Corporation	Houston, Texas	United States	For War Shipping Administration.
28 January	Empire Osborne	Scandinavian type cargo ship	William Gray & Co. Ltd.	West Hartlepool	United Kingdom	For Ministry of War Transport.
28 January	Empire Pitt	Cargo ship	J. L. Thompson & Sons Ltd.	Sunderland	United Kingdom	For Ministry of War Transport.
28 January	Halladale	River-class frigate	Harland & Wolff	Govan	United Kingdom	For Royal Navy.
28 January	Jan Pieterszoon Coen	Liberty ship	Permanente Metals, #1 Yard	Richmond, California	United States	For War Shipping Administration.
28 January	Linn Boyd	Liberty ship	Delta Shipbuilding Company	New Orleans, Louisiana	United States	For War Shipping Administration.
28 January	Morgan Robertson	Liberty ship	Permanente Metals, #2 Yard	Richmond, California	United States	For War Shipping Administration.
28 January	Peter Moran	Liberty ship	Oregon Shipbuilding Company	Portland, Oregon	United States	For War Shipping Administration.
28 January	Samteviot	Liberty ship	New England Shipbuilding Company	South Portland, Maine	United States	For Ministry of War Transport.
28 January	Sarah Orne Jewett	Liberty ship	New England Shipbuilding Company	South Portland, Maine	United States	For War Shipping Administration.
29 January	Edwin G. Weed	Liberty ship	St. Johns River Shipbuilding Company	Jacksonville, Florida	United States	For War Shipping Administration.
29 January	John Dockweiler	Liberty ship	California Shipbuilding Corporation	Los Angeles, California	United States	For War Shipping Administration.
29 January	Minnie M. Fiske	Liberty ship	J. A. Jones Construction Company	Panama City, Florida	United States	For War Shipping Administration.
29 January	Mission San Luis Rey	T2 tanker	Marinship Corporation	Sausalito, California	United States	For United States Maritime Commission.
29 January	R. Ney McNeely	Liberty ship	J. A. Jones Construction Company	Brunswick, Georgia	United States	For War Shipping Administration.
29 January	Missouri	Iowa-class battleship	Brooklyn Navy Yard	Brooklyn, New York	United States	For United States Navy
30 January	John Hope	Liberty ship	Permanente Metals, #2 Yard	Richmond, California	United States	For War Shipping Administration.
31 January	Cayuse	T2 Tanker	Alabama Drydock and Shipbuilding Company	Mobile, Alabama	United States	For War Shipping Administration.
31 January	CHANT 55	CHANT	Furness Shipbuilding Co. Ltd.	Haverton Hill-on-Tees	United Kingdom	For Ministry of War Transport.
31 January	David A. Curry	Liberty ship	California Shipbuilding Corporation	Los Angeles, California	United States	For War Shipping Administration.
31 January	Samannan	Liberty ship	New England Shipbuilding Company	South Portland, Maine	United States	For Ministry of War Transport.
31 January	Samleven	Liberty ship	Bethlehem-Fairfield Shipyards	Baltimore, Maryland	United States	For Ministry of War Transport.
January	CHANT 22	CHANT	Goole Shipbuilding & Repairing Co. Ltd.	Goole	United Kingdom	For Ministry of War Transport.
January	Njong	Hansa A Type cargo ship	Stettiner Vulkan Werft AG	Stettin	Germany	For Deutsche Afrika-Linien
January	VIC 52	VIC lighter	Brown's Shipbuilding & Dry Dock Co. Ltd.	Hull	United Kingdom	For the Admiralty.

== February ==
Date	Ship	Class / type	Builder	Location	Country	Notes
1 February	Daniel G. Reid	Liberty ship	Permanente Metals, #2 Yard	Richmond, California	United States	For War Shipping Administration.
2 February	Benue	Hansa A type cargo ship	A Vuyk & Zonen	Capelle aan den IJssel	Netherlands	For Deutsche Afrika Linien
2 February	Cornelius Vanderbilt	Liberty ship	Permanente Metals, #2 Yard	Richmond, California	United States	For War Shipping Administration.
2 February	Morris Sigman	Liberty ship	Bethlehem-Fairfield Shipyards	Baltimore, Maryland	United States	For War Shipping Administration.
2 February	William D. Byron	Liberty ship	Bethlehem-Fairfield Shipyards	Baltimore, Maryland	United States	For War Shipping Administration.
2 February	Pittsburgh	Baltimore-class cruiser	Bethlehem Steel Company	Quincy, Massachusetts	United States	For United States Navy
3 February	Frank Gilbreth	Liberty ship	Walsh-Kaiser Company	Providence, Rhode Island	United States	For War Shipping Administration.
3 February	Greece Victory	Victory ship	California Shipbuilding Corporation	Los Angeles, California	United States	For War Shipping Administration.
3 February	Morris Sheppard	Liberty ship	Todd Houston Shipbuilding Corporation	Houston, Texas	United States	For War Shipping Administration.
4 February	Britain Victory	Victory ship	Oregon Shipbuilding Company	Portland, Oregon	United States	For War Shipping Administration.
4 February	Sherman O. Houghton	Liberty ship	California Shipbuilding Corporation	Los Angeles, California	United States	For War Shipping Administration.
4 February	Shamrock Bay	Casablanca-class escort carrier	Kaiser Shipyards	Vancouver, Washington	United States	Converted S4 merchant hull, for United States Navy
5 February	James Devereux	Liberty ship	Permanente Metals, #2 Yard	Richmond, California	United States	For War Shipping Administration.
5 February	John H. Thomas	Liberty ship	Permanente Metals, #2 Yard	Richmond, California	United States	For War Shipping Administration.
5 February	Samhorn	Liberty ship	Southeastern Shipbuilding Corporation	Savannah, Georgia	United States	For Ministry of War Transport.
5 February	Samstrule	Liberty ship	Bethlehem-Fairfield Shipyards	Baltimore, Maryland	United States	
6 February	Atlanta	Cleveland-class cruiser	New York Shipbuilding Corporation	Camden, New Jersey	United States	For United States Navy
7 February	Benjamin H. Hill	Liberty ship	J. A. Jones Construction Company	Brunswick, Georgia	United States	For War Shipping Administration.
7 February	Samlyth	Liberty ship	Bethlehem-Fairfield Shipyards	Baltimore, Maryland	United States	For Ministry of War Transport.
7 February	Ticonderoga	Essex-class aircraft carrier	Newport News Shipbuilding	Newport News, Virginia	United States	For United States Navy
8 February	Andrew Turnbull	Liberty ship	St. Johns River Shipbuilding Company	Jacksonville, Florida	United States	For War Shipping Administration.
8 February	Oscar Underwood	Liberty ship	California Shipbuilding Corporation	Los Angeles, California	United States	For War Shipping Administration.
8 February	Paraguay	Cargo ship	Harland & Wolff	Belfast	United Kingdom	For Royal Mail Line.
8 February	Percy E. Foxworth	Liberty ship	Permanente Metals, #2 Yard	Richmond, California	United States	For War Shipping Administration.
8 February	HMS Rising Castle	Castle-class corvette	Harland & Wolff	Belfast	United Kingdom	For Royal Navy. Completed as HMCS Arnprior for Royal Canadian Navy.
8 February	Saminver	Liberty ship	Bethlehem-Fairfield Shipyards	Baltimore, Maryland	United States	for Ministry of War Transport.
8 February	TID 66	TID-class tug	Richard Dunston Ltd.	Thorne	United Kingdom	For the Admiralty.
8 February	Trevethoe	Cargo ship	William Doxford & Sons Ltd.	Pallion	United Kingdom	For Hain Steamship Co. Ltd.
9 February	Carl G. Barth	Liberty ship	Permanente Metals, #2 Yard	Richmond, California	United States	For War Shipping Administration.
9 February	Empire Milner	Wave-class oiler	Furness Shipbuilding Co. Ltd.	Haverton Hill-on-Tees	United Kingdom	For Ministry of War Transport.
9 February	John W. Griffiths	Liberty ship	J. A. Jones Construction Company	Panama City, Florida	United States	For War Shipping Administration.
9 February	Katharine L. Bates	Liberty ship	Todd Houston Shipbuilding Corporation	Houston, Texas	United States	For War Shipping Administration.
9 February	R. S. Wilson	Liberty ship	Delta Shipbuilding Company	New Orleans, Louisiana	United States	For War Shipping Administration.
9 February	Washington Allston	Liberty ship	New England Shipbuilding Company	South Portland, Maine	United States	For War Shipping Administration.
10 February	CHANT 23	CHANT	Goole Shipbuilding & Repairing Co. Ltd.	Goole	United Kingdom	For Ministry of War Transport.
10 February	CHANT 56	CHANT	Furness Shipbuilding Co. Ltd.	Haverton Hill-on-Tees	United Kingdom	For Ministry of War Transport.
10 February	Empire Call	Cargo ship	William Hamilton & Co Ltd	Port Glasgow	United Kingdom	For Ministry of War Transport
10 February	Horatio Allen	Liberty ship	California Shipbuilding Corporation	Los Angeles, California	United States	For War Shipping Administration.
10 February	James B. Aswell	Liberty ship	Delta Shipbuilding Company	New Orleans, Louisiana	United States	For War Shipping Administration.
10 February	James H. Breasted	Liberty ship	Permanente Metals, #1 Yard	Richmond, California	United States	For War Shipping Administration.
10 February	Northia	Tanker	Blythswood Shipbuilding Co. Ltd.	Glasgow	United Kingdom	For Anglo-Saxon Petroleum Co. Ltd.
11 February	CHANT 57	CHANT	Furness Shipbuilding Co. Ltd.	Haverton Hill-on-Tees	United Kingdom	For Ministry of War Transport.
11 February	Edwin C. Musick	Liberty ship	Permanente Metals, #2 Yard	Richmond, California	United States	For War Shipping Administration.
11 February	Thomas Donaldson	Liberty ship	Bethlehem-Fairfield Shipyards	Baltimore, Maryland	United States	For War Shipping Administration.
11 February	TID 67	TID-class tug	Richard Dunston Ltd.	Thorne	United Kingdom	For the War Department.
12 February	A. Mitchell Palmer	Liberty ship	Southeastern Shipbuilding Corporation	Savannah, Georgia	United States	For War Shipping Administration.
12 February	Mission San Carlos	T2 tanker	Marinship Corporation	Sausalito, California	United States	For United States Maritime Commission.
12 February	Norway Victory	Victory ship	Oregon Shipbuilding Company	Portland, Oregon	United States	For War Shipping Administration.
12 February	Russell H. Chittenden	Liberty ship	California Shipbuilding Corporation	Los Angeles, California	United States	For War Shipping Administration.
12 February	Sara Bache	Liberty ship	Permanente Metals, #2 Yard	Richmond, California	United States	For War Shipping Administration.
12 February	Shipley Bay	Casablanca-class escort carrier	Kaiser Shipyards	Vancouver, Washington	United States	Converted S4 merchant hull, for United States Navy
13 February	Jacob Perkins	Liberty ship	Todd Houston Shipbuilding Corporation	Houston, Texas	United States	For War Shipping Administration.
14 February	Jarvis	Fletcher-Class destroyer	Seattle Tacoma Shipbuilding Company	Seattle, Washington	United States	
14 February	Hans Heg	Liberty ship	Permanente Metals, #2 Yard	Richmond, California	United States	For War Shipping Administration.
14 February	Joseph M. Terrell	Liberty ship	J. A. Jones Construction Company	Brunswick, Georgia	United States	For War Shipping Administration.
14 February	Lloydcrest	Cargo ship	Lithgows Ltd.	Port Glasgow	United Kingdom	For Crest Shipping Co. Ltd.
14 February	Samlossie	Liberty ship	Bethlehem-Fairfield Shipyards	Baltimore, Maryland	United States	For Ministry of War Transport.
14 February	Walter Wyman	Liberty ship	Permanente Metals, #1 Yard	Richmond, California	United States	For War Shipping Administration.
14 February	Caesar	C-class destroyer	John Brown & Company	Clydebank	United Kingdom	For Royal Navy.
15 February	Franz Sigel	Liberty ship	Permanente Metals, #2 Yard	Richmond, California	United States	For War Shipping Administration.
15 February	Ida M. Tarbell	Liberty ship	California Shipbuilding Corporation	Los Angeles, California	United States	For War Shipping Administration.
15 February	Trevider	Cargo ship	Lithgows Ltd.	Port Glasgow	United Kingdom	For Hain Steamship Co. Ltd.
16 February	Samstrae	Liberty ship	New England Shipbuilding Company	South Portland, Maine	United States	For Ministry of War Transport.
16 February	Samtyne	Liberty ship	New England Shipbuilding Company	South Portland, Maine	United States	For Ministry of War Transport.
16 February	TID 68	TID-class tug	Richard Dunston Ltd.	Thorne	United Kingdom	For the United States Army.
16 February	Wolf Mountain	T2 Tanker	Alabama Drydock and Shipbuilding Company	Mobile, Alabama	United States	For War Shipping Administration.
17 February	Arthur A. Penn	Liberty ship	Permanente Metals, #2 Yard	Richmond, California	United States	For War Shipping Administration.
17 February	Augustin Daly	Liberty ship	Permanente Metals, #1 Yard	Richmond, California	United States	For War Shipping Administration.
17 February	Augustus Saint Gaudens	Liberty ship	J. A. Jones Construction Company	Panama City, Florida	United States	For War Shipping Administration.
17 February	Frederick W. Taylor	Liberty ship	New England Shipbuilding Company	South Portland, Maine	United States	For War Shipping Administration.
17 February	J. Frank Cooper	Liberty ship	California Shipbuilding Corporation	Los Angeles, California	United States	For War Shipping Administration.
17 February	Jose G. Benitez	Liberty ship	Todd Houston Shipbuilding Corporation	Houston, Texas	United States	For War Shipping Administration.
17 February	Rufus E. Foster	Liberty ship	Delta Shipbuilding Company	New Orleans, Louisiana	United States	For War Shipping Administration.
18 February	Allen Johnson	Liberty ship	Permanente Metals, #2 Yard	Richmond, California	United States	For War Shipping Administration.
18 February	Leyte	Liberty ship	Bethlehem-Fairfield Shipyards	Baltimore, Maryland	United States	For War Shipping Administration.
19 February	Andres Almonaster	Liberty ship	Delta Shipbuilding Company	New Orleans, Louisiana	United States	For War Shipping Administration.
19 February	Cornelius Ford	Liberty ship	Walsh-Kaiser Company	Providence, Rhode Island	United States	For War Shipping Administration.
19 February	Henry S. Sanford	Liberty ship	St. Johns River Shipbuilding Company	Jacksonville, Florida	United States	For War Shipping Administration.
19 February	John L. Elliott	Liberty ship	Bethlehem-Fairfield Shipyards	Baltimore, Maryland	United States	For War Shipping Administration.
19 February	Robert L. Hague	Liberty ship	California Shipbuilding Corporation	Los Angeles, California	United States	For War Shipping Administration.
19 February	Sitkoh Bay	Casablanca-class escort carrier	Kaiser Shipyards	Vancouver, Washington	United States	Converted S4 merchant hull, for United States Navy
20 February	Czechoslovakia Victory	Victory ship	Oregon Shipbuilding Company	Portland, Oregon	United States	For War Shipping Administration.
20 February	George A. Pope	Liberty ship	Permanente Metals, #2 Yard	Richmond, California	United States	For War Shipping Administration.
20 February	Oklahoma City	Cleveland-class cruiser	William Cramp & Sons	Philadelphia	United States	For United States Navy
21 February	CHANT 66	CHANT	Burntisland Shipbuilding Co. Ltd.	Burntisland	United Kingdom	For Ministry of War Transport.
21 February	Robert R. Livingston	Liberty ship	J. A. Jones Construction Company	Brunswick, Georgia	United States	For War Shipping Administration.
21 February	Samconon	Liberty ship	Bethlehem-Fairfield Shipyards	Baltimore, Maryland	United States	For Ministry of War Transport.
21 February	TID 69	TID-class tug	Richard Dunston Ltd.	Thorne	United Kingdom	For the Admiralty.
22 February	Avonwood	Cargo ship	Hall, Russell & Co. Ltd.	Aberdeen	United Kingdom	For Joseph Constantine Steamship Line Ltd.
22 February	CHANT 5	CHANT	Henry Scarr Ltd.	Hessle	United Kingdom	For Ministry of War Transport.
22 February	Joseph J. Kinyoun	Liberty ship	Permanente Metals, #2 Yard	Richmond, California	United States	For War Shipping Administration.
22 February	Robert Henri	Liberty ship	Todd Houston Shipbuilding Corporation	Houston, Texas	United States	For War Shipping Administration.
23 February	CHANT 58	CHANT	Furness Shipbuilding Co. Ltd.	Haverton Hill-on-Tees	United Kingdom	For Ministry of War Transport.
23 February	CHANT 67	CHANT	Burntisland Shipbuilding Co. Ltd.	Burntisland	United Kingdom	For Ministry of War Transport.
23 February	Vengeance	Colossus-class aircraft carrier	Swan Hunter	Wallsend	United Kingdom	
23 February	I. N. Van Nuys	Liberty ship	California Shipbuilding Corporation	Los Angeles, California	United States	For War Shipping Administration.
23 February	Juan Pablo Duarte	Liberty ship	Permanente Metals, #2 Yard	Richmond, California	United States	For War Shipping Administration.
23 February	Keith Palmer	Liberty ship	Todd Houston Shipbuilding Corporation	Houston, Texas	United States	For War Shipping Administration.
23 February	Samdart	Liberty ship	Southeastern Shipbuilding Corporation	Savannah, Georgia	United States	For Ministry of War Transport.
24 February	Empire Gladstone	Cargo ship	Shipbuilding Corporation Ltd.	Sunderland	United Kingdom	For Ministry of War Transport.
24 February	Empire Lankester	Cargo ship	William Gray & Co. Ltd.	West Hartlepool	United Kingdom	For Ministry of War Transport.
24 February	Shangri-La	Essex-class aircraft carrier	Norfolk Navy Yard	Norfolk, Virginia	United States	For United States Navy
24 February	John M. Brooke	Liberty ship	J. A. Jones Construction Company	Panama City, Florida	United States	For War Shipping Administration.
24 February	Samaffric	Liberty ship	Bethlehem-Fairfield Shipyards	Baltimore, Maryland	United States	For Ministry of War Transport.
24 February	Samgaudie	Liberty ship	Bethlehem-Fairfield Shipyards	Baltimore, Maryland	United States	For Ministry of War Transport.
24 February	Sherborne Castle	Castle-class corvette	Harland & Wolff	Belfast	United Kingdom	For Royal Navy. Completed as HMCS Petrolia for Royal Canadian Navy.
24 February	Warren Delano	Liberty ship	Bethlehem-Fairfield Shipyards	Baltimore, Maryland	United States	For War Shipping Administration.
25 February	Empire Captain	Standard Fast type cargo liner	Caledon Shipbuilding & Engineering Company	Dundee	United Kingdom	For Ministry of War Transport.
25 February	Empire Paragon	Standard Fast type cargo liner	Sir J. Laing & Sons Ltd.	Scotstoun	United Kingdom	For Ministry of War Transport.
25 February	John F. Shafroth	Liberty ship	Permanente Metals, #2 Yard	Richmond, California	United States	For War Shipping Administration.
26 February	Cleveland Forbes	Liberty ship	Permanente Metals, #2 Yard	Richmond, California	United States	For War Shipping Administration.
26 February	Neverita	Tanker	Swan, Hunter & Wigham Richardson Ltd.	Wallsend	United Kingdom	For Anglo-Saxon Petroleum Co. Ltd.
26 February	Samnethy	Liberty ship	Bethlehem-Fairfield Shipyards	Baltimore, Maryland	United States	For Ministry of War Transport.
26 February	Samwye	Liberty ship	New England Shipbuilding Company	South Portland, Maine	United States	For Ministry of War Transport.
26 February	TID 70	TID-class tug	Richard Dunston Ltd.	Thorne	United Kingdom	For the Admiralty Ministry of War Transport.
26 February	U.S.S.R. Victory	Victory ship	California Shipbuilding Corporation	Los Angeles, California	United States	For War Shipping Administration.
26 February	Steamer Bay	Casablanca-class escort carrier	Kaiser Shipyards	Vancouver, Washington	United States	Converted S4 merchant hull, for United States Navy
27 February	George A. Marr	Liberty ship	Delta Shipbuilding Company	New Orleans	United States	For War Shipping Administration.
28 February	CHANT 24	CHANT	Goole Shipbuilding & Repairing Co. Ltd.	Goole	United Kingdom	For Ministry of War Transport.
28 February	Luxembourg Victory	Victory ship	Oregon Shipbuilding Company	Portland, Oregon	United States	For War Shipping Administration.
28 February	Mission De Pala	T2 tanker	Marinship Corporation	Sausalito, California	United States	For United States Maritime Commission.
28 February	Sidney H. Short	Liberty ship	Permanente Metals, #2 Yard	Richmond, California	United States	For War Shipping Administration.
28 February	Bennington	Essex-class aircraft carrier	Bethlehem Shipbuilding	Quincy, Massachusetts	United States	For United States Navy
28 February	Zealous	Z-class destroyer	Cammell Laird	Birkenhead	United Kingdom	For Royal Navy.
20 February	CHANT 59	CHANT	Furness Shipbuilding Co. Ltd.	Haverton Hill-on-Tees	United Kingdom	For Ministry of War Transport.
20 February	Hever Castle	Castle-class corvette	Blyth Dry Docks & Shipbuilding Co. Ltd	Blyth, Northumberland	United Kingdom	For Royal Navy. Completed as Copper Cliff for Royal Canadian Navy.
29 February	CHANT 68	CHANT	Burntisland Shipbuilding Co. Ltd.	Burntisland	United Kingdom	For Ministry of War Transport.
29 February	E. A. Bryan	Liberty ship	Permanente Metals, #2 Yard	Richmond, California	United States	For War Shipping Administration.
29 February	Empire Trotwood	Coastal tanker	Grangemouth Dockyard Co Ltd	Grangemouth	United Kingdom	For Ministry of War Transport
29 February	Fort Bridger	T2 Tanker	Alabama Drydock and Shipbuilding Company	Mobile, Alabama	United States	For War Shipping Administration.
29 February	James L. Ackerson	Liberty ship	St. Johns River Shipbuilding Company	Jacksonville, Florida	United States	For War Shipping Administration.
29 February	Samalness	Liberty ship	J. A. Jones Construction Company	Brunswick, Georgia	United States	For Ministry of War Transport.
29 February	Stephen W. Gambrill	Liberty ship	Bethlehem-Fairfield Shipyards	Baltimore, Maryland	United States	For War Shipping Administration.
29 February	Wyoming Valley	T2 Tanker	Alabama Drydock and Shipbuilding Company	Mobile, Alabama	United States	For War Shipping Administration.
February	Avondale Park	Park ship	Foundation Maritime Ltd	Picton, Ontario	Canada	For Canadian Government
February	CHANT 1	CHANT	Henry Scarr Ltd.	Hessle	United Kingdom	For Ministry of War Transport.
February	CHANT 2	CHANT	Henry Scarr Ltd.	Hessle	United Kingdom	For Ministry of War Transport.
February	CHANT 3	CHANT	Henry Scarr Ltd.	Hessle	United Kingdom	For Ministry of War Transport.
February	CHANT 4	CHANT	Henry Scarr Ltd.	Hessle	United Kingdom	For Ministry of War Transport.
February	VIC 53	VIC lighter	Brown's Shipbuilding & Dry Dock Co. Ltd.	Hull	United Kingdom	For the Admiralty.

== March ==
Date	Ship	Class / type	Builder	Location	Country	Notes
1 March	John Roach	Liberty ship	Permanente Metals, #1 Yard	Richmond, California	United States	For War Shipping Administration.
1 March	TID 71	TID-class tug	Richard Dunston Ltd.	Thorne	United Kingdom	For the United States Army.
2 March	Anna H. Branch	Liberty ship	Todd Houston Shipbuilding Corporation	Houston, Texas	United States	For War Shipping Administration.
2 March	Henry M. Stephens	Liberty ship	Permanente Metals, #2 Yard	Richmond, California	United States	For War Shipping Administration.
2 March	Imkenturm	Hansa A Type cargo ship	Werf de Noord	Alblasserdam	Netherlands	For Deutsche Dampfschifffarts-Gesellschaft Hansa
3 March	Jesse H. Metcalf	Liberty ship	Walsh-Kaiser Company	Providence, Rhode Island	United States	For War Shipping Administration.
3 March	John E. Sweet	Liberty ship	Southeastern Shipbuilding Corporation	Savannah, Georgia	United States	For War Shipping Administration.
3 March	Sameden	Liberty ship	Bethlehem-Fairfield Shipyards	Baltimore, Maryland	United States	For Ministry of War Transport.
3 March	Cape Esperance	Casablanca-class escort carrier	Kaiser Shipyards	Vancouver, Washington	United States	Converted S4 merchant hull, for United States Navy
4 March	Frederick C. Hicks	Liberty ship	California Shipbuilding Corporation	Los Angeles, California	United States	For War Shipping Administration.
4 March	George Steers	Liberty ship	Todd Houston Shipbuilding Corporation	Houston, Texas	United States	For War Shipping Administration.
4 March	Harry Toulmin	Liberty ship	Delta Shipbuilding Company	New Orleans, Louisiana	United States	For War Shipping Administration.
4 March	Mackinaw	Great Lakes icebreaker	American Ship Building Company	Toledo, Ohio	United States	
4 March	Rebecca Lukens	Liberty ship	J. A. Jones Construction Company	Panama City, Florida	United States	For War Shipping Administration.
4 March	Samcolne	Liberty ship	Bethlehem-Fairfield Shipyards	Baltimore, Maryland	United States	For Ministry of War Transport.
4 March	Stanton H. King	Liberty ship	New England Shipbuilding Company	South Portland, Maine	United States	For War Shipping Administration.
4 March	Willet M. Hays	Liberty ship	Permanente Metals, #2 Yard	Richmond, California	United States	For War Shipping Administration.
6 March	Cecil N. Bean	Liberty ship	Delta Shipbuilding Company	New Orleans, Louisiana	United States	For War Shipping Administration.
6 March	Edward E. Hale	Liberty ship	Permanente Metals, #2 Yard	Richmond, California	United States	For War Shipping Administration.
6 March	Isaac Shelby	Liberty ship	J. A. Jones Construction Company	Brunswick, Georgia	United States	For War Shipping Administration.
6 March	Netherlands Victory	Victory ship	Oregon Shipbuilding Company	Portland, Oregon	United States	For War Shipping Administration.
6 March	TID 72	TID-class tug	Richard Dunston Ltd.	Thorne	United Kingdom	For the Admiralty Ministry of War Transport.
6 March	United States Victory	Victory ship	California Shipbuilding Corporation	Los Angeles, California	United States	For War Shipping Administration.
7 March	Arthur Sewall	Liberty ship	New England Shipbuilding Company	South Portland, Maine	United States	For War Shipping Administration.
7 March	C. K. McClatchy	Liberty ship	California Shipbuilding Corporation	Los Angeles, California	United States	For War Shipping Administration.
7 March	Charles John Seghers	Liberty ship	Permanente Metals, #2 Yard	Richmond, California	United States	For War Shipping Administration.
7 March	Robert Ellis Lewis	Liberty ship	Bethlehem-Fairfield Shipyards	Baltimore, Maryland	United States	For War Shipping Administration.
7 March	Samderwent	Liberty ship	New England Shipbuilding Company	South Portland, Maine	United States	For Ministry of War Transport.
7 March	Samsperrin	Liberty ship	New England Shipbuilding Company	South Portland, Maine	United States	For Ministry of War Transport.
8 March	Zebra	Z-class destroyer	William Denny and Brothers	Dumbarton	United Kingdom	
9 March	Apache Canyon	T2 Tanker	Alabama Drydock and Shipbuilding Company	Mobile, Alabama	United States	For War Shipping Administration.
9 March	Clan Chattan	Cargo ship	Greenock Dockyard Co. Ltd.	Greenock	United Kingdom	For the Clan Line Steamers Ltd.
9 March	Empire Grey	Cargo ship	John Readhead & Sons Ltd.	South Shields	United Kingdom	For Ministry of War Transport.
9 March	Empire Mandarin	Cargo ship	Shipbuilding Corporation Ltd.	Newcastle upon Tyne	United Kingdom	For Ministry of War Transport.
9 March	Lairds Loch	Passenger and cargo coaster	Ardrossan Dockyard Ltd.	Ardrossan, Scotland	United Kingdom	For Burns & Laird Lines Ltd.
9 March	Samshee	Liberty ship	Bethlehem-Fairfield Shipyards	Baltimore, Maryland	United States	For Ministry of War Transport.
9 March	Springfield	Cleveland-class cruiser	Fore River Shipyard	Quincy, Massachusetts	United States	For United States Navy
9 March	TID 73	TID-class tug	Richard Dunston Ltd.	Thorne	United Kingdom	For the United States Army.
9 March	William J. Gray	Liberty ship	Permanente Metals, #2 Yard	Richmond, California	United States	For War Shipping Administration.
10 March	Amerigo Vespucci	Liberty ship	Permanente Metals, #2 Yard	Richmond, California	United States	For War Shipping Administration.
10 March	CHANT 62	CHANT	Furness Shipbuilding Co. Ltd.	Haverton Hill-on-Tees	United Kingdom	For Ministry of War Transport.
10 March	CHANT 69	CHANT	Burntisland Shipbuilding Co. Ltd.	Burntisland	United Kingdom	For Ministry of War Transport.
10 March	Henry Adams	Liberty ship	Permanente Metals, #1 Yard	Richmond, California	United States	For War Shipping Administration.
10 March	Joe Fellows	Liberty ship	California Shipbuilding Corporation	Los Angeles, California	United States	For War Shipping Administration.
10 March	John Gibbon	Liberty ship	Todd Houston Shipbuilding Corporation	Houston, Texas	United States	For War Shipping Administration.
10 March	Samlea	Liberty ship	Bethlehem-Fairfield Shipyards	Baltimore, Maryland	United States	For Ministry of War Transport.
10 March	Takanis Bay	Casablanca-class escort carrier	Kaiser Shipyards	Vancouver, Washington	United States	Converted S4 merchant hull, for United States Navy
11 March	Fort Constantine	Victory ship	Burrard Dry Dock Co. Ltd	North Vancouver, British Columbia	Canada	Ministry of War Transport.
11 March	George Middlemas	Liberty ship	Permanente Metals, #2 Yard	Richmond, California	United States	For War Shipping Administration.
11 March	John M. Parker	Liberty ship	Delta Shipbuilding Company	New Orleans, Louisiana	United States	For War Shipping Administration.
11 March	Kaimanawa	Cargo ship	Henry Robb Ltd.	Leith	United Kingdom	For Union Steamship Company of New Zealand Ltd.
11 March	Philippines Victory	Victory ship	California Shipbuilding Corporation	Los Angeles, California	United States	For War Shipping Administration.
11 March	Samdaring	Liberty ship	New England Shipbuilding Company	South Portland, Maine	United States	For Ministry of War Transport.
11 March	Zodiac	Z-class destroyer	J I Thornycroft	Woolston	United Kingdom	
12 March	Edward W. Bok	Liberty ship	St. Johns River Shipbuilding Company	Jacksonville, Florida	United States	For War Shipping Administration.
13 March	Belgium Victory	Victory ship	Oregon Shipbuilding Company	Portland, Oregon	United States	For War Shipping Administration.
13 March	CHANT 25	CHANT	Goole Shipbuilding & Repairing Co. Ltd.	Goole	United Kingdom	For Ministry of War Transport.
13 March	CHANT 63	CHANT	Furness Shipbuilding Co. Ltd.	Haverton Hill-on-Tees	United Kingdom	For Ministry of War Transport.
14 March	Alanson B. Houghton	Liberty ship	J. A. Jones Construction Company	Panama City, Florida	United States	For War Shipping Administration.
14 March	Clark Howell	Liberty ship	Southeastern Shipbuilding Corporation	Savannah, Georgia	United States	For War Shipping Administration.
14 March	Empire Doris	Modified Warrior-type tug	Scott & Sons Ltd.	Bowling	United Kingdom	For Ministry of War Transport.
14 March	Mission San Diego	T2 tanker	Marinship Corporation	Sausalito, California	United States	For United States Maritime Commission.
14 March	Robert D. Carey	Liberty ship	Permanente Metals, #2 Yard	Richmond, California	United States	For War Shipping Administration.
14 March	Samjack	Liberty ship	Bethlehem-Fairfield Shipyards	Baltimore, Maryland	United States	For Ministry of War Transport.
14 March	Thomas Say	Liberty ship	Todd Houston Shipbuilding Corporation	Houston, Texas	United States	For War Shipping Administration.
14 March	TID 74	TID-class tug	Richard Dunston Ltd.	Thorne	United Kingdom	For Ministry of War Transport.
16 March	Samfairy	Liberty ship	J. A. Jones Construction Company	Brunswick, Georgia	United States	For Ministry of War Transport.
16 March	Samspelga	Liberty ship	Bethlehem-Fairfield Shipyards	Baltimore, Maryland	United States	For Ministry of War Transport.
16 March	Thetis Bay	Casablanca-class escort carrier	Kaiser Shipyards	Vancouver, Washington	United States	Converted S4 merchant hull, for United States Navy
17 March	Earl Layman	Liberty ship	Southeastern Shipbuilding Corporation	Savannah, Georgia	United States	For War Shipping Administration.
17 March	George Coggeshall	Liberty ship	Permanente Metals, #1 Yard	Richmond, California	United States	For War Shipping Administration.
17 March	H. Weir Cook	Liberty ship	Permanente Metals, #2 Yard	Richmond, California	United States	For War Shipping Administration.
17 March	Lillian Nordica	Liberty ship	New England Shipbuilding Company	South Portland, Maine	United States	For War Shipping Administration.
17 March	VIC 42	VIC lighter	Richard Dunston Ltd.	Thorne	United Kingdom	For the Admiralty.
18 March	Isaac Van Zandt	Liberty ship	Todd Houston Shipbuilding Corporation	Houston, Texas	United States	For War Shipping Administration.
18 March	Samdonard	Liberty ship	Bethlehem-Fairfield Shipyards	Baltimore, Maryland	United States	For Ministry of War Transport.
18 March	TID 75	TID-class tug	Richard Dunston Ltd.	Thorne	United Kingdom	For the Admiralty.
19 March	Park Benjamin	Liberty ship	New England Shipbuilding Company	South Portland, Maine	United States	For War Shipping Administration.
19 March	Samderry	Liberty ship	New England Shipbuilding Company	South Portland, Maine	United States	For Ministry of War Transport.
19 March	Dayton	Cleveland-class cruiser	New York Shipbuilding Corporation	Camden, New Jersey	United States	For United States Navy
20 March	Canada Victory	Victory ship	Oregon Shipbuilding Company	Portland, Oregon	United States	For War Shipping Administration.
20 March	Louis Weule	Liberty ship	Permanente Metals, #2 Yard	Richmond, California	United States	For War Shipping Administration.
20 March	Melucta	Liberty ship	St. Johns River Shipbuilding Company	Jacksonville, Florida	United States	For War Shipping Administration.
20 March	New Zealand Victory	Victory ship	California Shipbuilding Corporation	Los Angeles, California	United States	For War Shipping Administration.
21 March	Autossee	T2 Tanker	Alabama Drydock and Shipbuilding Company	Mobile, Alabama	United States	For War Shipping Administration.
21 March	Jacques Philippe Villere	Liberty ship	Delta Shipbuilding Company	New Orleans, Louisiana	United States	For War Shipping Administration.
21 March	Jose M. Morelos	Liberty ship	Permanente Metals, #2 Yard	Richmond, California	United States	For War Shipping Administration.
21 March	Samuel G. French	Liberty ship	J. A. Jones Construction Company	Panama City, Florida	United States	For War Shipping Administration.
22 March	Daniel E. Garrett	Liberty ship	Todd Houston Shipbuilding Corporation	Houston, Texas	United States	For War Shipping Administration.
22 March	Edward B. Haines	Liberty ship	Bethlehem-Fairfield Shipyards	Baltimore, Maryland	United States	For War Shipping Administration.
22 March	Makassar Strait	Casablanca-class escort carrier	Kaiser Shipyards	Vancouver, Washington	United States	Converted S4 merchant hull, for United States Navy
22 March	Samgallion	Liberty ship	Bethlehem-Fairfield Shipyards	Baltimore, Maryland	United States	For Ministry of War Transport.
22 March	TID 76	TID-class tug	Richard Dunston Ltd.	Thorne	United Kingdom	For the United States Army.
23 March	Benjamin Waterhouse	Liberty ship	Permanente Metals, #2 Yard	Richmond, California	United States	For War Shipping Administration.
23 March	Richmond Castle	Refrigerated cargo ship	Harland & Wolff	Belfast	United Kingdom	For Union-Castle Line.
23 March	Samfoyle	Liberty ship	J. A. Jones Construction Company	Brunswick, Georgia	United States	For Ministry of War Transport.
24 March	Empire Malta	Empire Malta-class Scandinavian type cargo ship	William Gray & Co. Ltd.	West Hartlepool	United Kingdom	For Ministry of War Transport.
24 March	Iran Victory	Victory ship	Oregon Shipbuilding Company	Portland, Oregon	United States	For War Shipping Administration.
24 March	John Isaacson	Liberty ship	Permanente Metals, #1 Yard	Richmond, California	United States	For War Shipping Administration.
25 March	Samhope	Liberty ship	Bethlehem-Fairfield Shipyards	Baltimore, Maryland	United States	For Ministry of War Transport.
25 March	William Schirmer	Liberty ship	Permanente Metals, #2 Yard	Richmond, California	United States	For War Shipping Administration.
27 March	Benlawers	Cargo ship	Charles Connell & Co Ltd	Glasgow	United Kingdom	For Ben Line.
27 March	Christopher S. Flanagan	Liberty ship	Todd Houston Shipbuilding Corporation	Houston, Texas	United States	For War Shipping Administration.
27 March	J. S. Hutchinson	Liberty ship	Permanente Metals, #2 Yard	Richmond, California	United States	For War Shipping Administration.
27 March	Mexico Victory	Victory ship	California Shipbuilding Corporation	Los Angeles, California	United States	For War Shipping Administration.
27 March	Mollie Moore Davis	For War Shipping Administration.	Delta Shipbuilding Company	New Orleans, Louisiana	United States	
27 March	Samneagh	Liberty ship	Bethlehem-Fairfield Shipyards	Baltimore, Maryland	United States	For Ministry of War Transport.
28 March	Belgian Tenacity	Liberty ship	New England Shipbuilding Company	South Portland, Maine	United States	For War Shipping Administration.
28 March	Carron	C-class destroyer	Scotts	Greenock	United Kingdom	
28 March	CHANT 26	CHANT	Goole Shipbuilding & Repairing Co. Ltd.	Goole	United Kingdom	For Ministry of War Transport.
28 March	CHANT 64	CHANT	Furness Shipbuilding Co. Ltd.	Haverton Hill-on-Tees	United Kingdom	For Ministry of War Transport.
28 March	Edward S. Hough	Liberty ship	Permanente Metals, #2 Yard	Richmond, California	United States	For War Shipping Administration.
28 March	Mission Carmel	T2 tanker	Marinship Corporation	Sausalito, California	United States	For United States Maritime Commission.
28 March	Thomas LeValley	Liberty ship	J. A. Jones Construction Company	Panama City, Florida	United States	For War Shipping Administration.
28 March	TID 77	TID-class tug	Richard Dunston Ltd.	Thorne	United Kingdom	For the Admiralty.
29 March	Cormoat	Collier	Burntisland Shipbuilding Company	Burntisland	United Kingdom	For Wm. Cory & Son Ltd.
29 March	John H. Murphy	Liberty ship	Bethlehem-Fairfield Shipyards	Baltimore, Maryland	United States	For War Shipping Administration.
29 March	Propus	Liberty ship	St. Johns River Shipbuilding Company	Jacksonville, Florida	United States	For War Shipping Administration.
29 March	Windham Bay	Casablanca-class escort carrier	Kaiser Shipyards	Vancouver, Washington	United States	Converted S4 merchant hull, for United States Navy
30 March	Brazil Victory	Victory ship	California Shipbuilding Corporation	Los Angeles, California	United States	For War Shipping Administration.
30 March	E. A. Burnett	Liberty ship	Permanente Metals, #2 Yard	Richmond, California	United States	For War Shipping Administration.
30 March	John Ireland	Liberty ship	Todd Houston Shipbuilding Corporation	Houston, Texas	United States	For War Shipping Administration.
30 March	Kochab	For War Shipping Administration.	Delta Shipbuilding Company	New Orleans, Louisiana	United States	
31 March	Samfinn	Liberty ship	J. A. Jones Construction Company	Brunswick, Georgia	United States	For Ministry of War Transport.
31 March	Samsturdy	Liberty ship	Bethlehem-Fairfield Shipyards	Baltimore, Maryland	United States	For Ministry of War Transport.
31 March	Silvestre Escalante	Liberty ship	Permanente Metals, #1 Yard	Richmond, California	United States	For War Shipping Administration.
31 March	TID 78	TID-class tug	Richard Dunston Ltd.	Thorne	United Kingdom	For the War Department.
31 March	Wallace R. Farrington	Liberty ship	Permanente Metals, #2 Yard	Richmond, California	United States	For War Shipping Administration.
31 March	White River	T2 Tanker	Alabama Drydock and Shipbuilding Company	Mobile, Alabama	United States	For War Shipping Administration.
March	CHANT 6	CHANT	Henry Scarr Ltd.	Hessle	United Kingdom	For Ministry of War Transport.
March	LST 7063	Landing Ship, Tank Mk.3	Blyth Dry Docks & Shipbuilding Co. Ltd	Blyth, Northumberland	United Kingdom	For Royal Navy.
March	LST 7064	Landing Ship, Tank Mk.3	Blyth Dry Docks & Shipbuilding Co. Ltd	Blyth, Northumberland	United Kingdom	For Royal Navy.

== April ==
Date	Ship	Class / type	Builder	Location	Country	Notes
1 April	El Salvador Victory	Victory ship	Oregon Shipbuilding Company	Portland, Oregon	United States	For War Shipping Administration.
2 April	Nelson Aldrich	Liberty ship	Walsh-Kaiser Company	Providence, Rhode Island	United States	For War Shipping Administration.
3 April	Louis Sloss	Liberty ship	Permanente Metals, #2 Yard	Richmond, California	United States	For War Shipping Administration.
3 April	Panama Victory	Victory ship	California Shipbuilding Corporation	Los Angeles, California	United States	For War Shipping Administration.
3 April	Samdauntless	Liberty ship	Bethlehem-Fairfield Shipyards	Baltimore, Maryland	United States	For Ministry of War Transport.
4 April	Günther	Hansa A type cargo ship	Neptun AG	Rostock	Germany	For Hamburg Südamerikanische Dampfschifffahrts-Gesellschaft A/S & Co KG
4 April	Henry M. Robert	Liberty ship	Todd Houston Shipbuilding Corporation	Houston, Texas	United States	For War Shipping Administration.
4 April	Josephine Shaw Lowell	Liberty ship	J. A. Jones Construction Company	Panama City, Florida	United States	For War Shipping Administration.
4 April	Samadre	Liberty ship	New England Shipbuilding Company	South Portland, Maine	United States	For Ministry of War Transport.
4 April	Toussaint L'Ouverture	Liberty ship	Permanente Metals, #2 Yard	Richmond, California	United States	For War Shipping Administration.
5 April	Andrew Stevenson	Liberty ship	Delta Shipbuilding Company	New Orleans, Louisiana	United States	For War Shipping Administration.
5 April	Charles Dauray	Liberty ship	New England Shipbuilding Company	South Portland, Maine	United States	For War Shipping Administration.
5 April	Elijah Kellogg	Liberty ship	New England Shipbuilding Company	South Portland, Maine	United States	For War Shipping Administration.
5 April	Lawrence J. Brengle	Liberty ship	Bethlehem-Fairfield Shipyards	Baltimore, Maryland	United States	For War Shipping Administration.
5 April	Louis Sullivan	Liberty ship	Permanente Metals, #2 Yard	Richmond, California	United States	For War Shipping Administration.
5 April	Makin Island	Casablanca-class escort carrier	Kaiser Shipyards	Vancouver, Washington	United States	Converted S4 merchant hull, for United States Navy
6 April	Dominican Victory	Victory ship	Oregon Shipbuilding Company	Portland, Oregon	United States	For War Shipping Administration.
6 April	Edward A. Filene	Liberty ship	St. Johns River Shipbuilding Company	Jacksonville, Florida	United States	For War Shipping Administration.
6 April	Rivercrest	Cargo ship	Lithgows Ltd.	Port Glasgow	United Kingdom	For Crest Shipping Co. Ltd.
6 April	TID 79	TID-class tug	Richard Dunston Ltd.	Thorne	United Kingdom	For the War Department.
6 April	Unnamed	Wave-class oiler	Harland & Wolff	Govan	United Kingdom	For the Admiralty. Laid down as Empire Sheba for Ministry of War Transport but name cancelled before launch. Completed as RFA Wave King Royal Fleet Auxiliary.
7 April	Lucien Labaudt	Liberty ship	Permanente Metals, #2 Yard	Richmond, California	United States	For War Shipping Administration.
7 April	Peter Lassen	Liberty ship	California Shipbuilding Corporation	Los Angeles, California	United States	For War Shipping Administration.
7 April	VIC 43	VIC lighter	Richard Dunston Ltd.	Thorne	United Kingdom	For the Admiralty.
8 April	Mission San Antonio	T2 tanker	Marinship Corporation	Sausalito, California	United States	For United States Maritime Commission.
8 April	Seize	Diver-class rescue and salvage ship	Basalt Rock Company	Napa, California	United States	For United States Navy
8 April	Snatch	Diver-class rescue and salvage ship	Basalt Rock Company	Napa, California	United States	For United States Navy
8 April	James A. Drain	Liberty ship	Permanente Metals, #2 Yard	Richmond, California	United States	For War Shipping Administration.
8 April	Samvigna	Liberty ship	J. A. Jones Construction Company	Brunswick, Georgia	United States	For Ministry of War Transport.
8 April	Sul Ross	Liberty ship	Todd Houston Shipbuilding Corporation	Houston, Texas	United States	For War Shipping Administration.
8 April	William Hodson	Liberty ship	Bethlehem-Fairfield Shipyards	Baltimore, Maryland	United States	For War Shipping Administration.
10 April	Colombia Victory	Victory ship	California Shipbuilding Corporation	Los Angeles, California	United States	For War Shipping Administration.
10 April	Deborah Gannett	Liberty ship	Bethlehem-Fairfield Shipyards	Baltimore, Maryland	United States	For War Shipping Administration.
10 April	John A. Treutlen	Liberty ship	Southeastern Shipbuilding Corporation	Savannah, Georgia	United States	For War Shipping Administration.
10 April	Samtrusty	Liberty ship	Bethlehem-Fairfield Shipyards	Baltimore, Maryland	United States	For Ministry of War Transport.
10 April	Empire Roger	Near-Warrior type tug	A. Hall & Co. Ltd.	Aberdeen	United Kingdom	For Ministry of War Transport.
11 April	Ben A. Ruffin	Liberty ship	Southeastern Shipbuilding Corporation	Savannah, Georgia	United States	For War Shipping Administration.
11 April	CHANT 60	CHANT	J. Readhead & Sons Ltd.	South Shields	United Kingdom	For Ministry of War Transport.
11 April	CHANT 61	CHANT	J. Readhead & Sons Ltd.	South Shields	United Kingdom	For Ministry of War Transport.
11 April	Empire Lundy	Isles-class coastal tanker	J. Harker Ltd.	Knottingley	United Kingdom	For Ministry of War Transport.
11 April	Empire Pendennis	Cargo ship	Short Brothers Ltd.	Sunderland	United Kingdom	For Ministry of War Transport.
11 April	Richard V. Oulahan	Liberty ship	J. A. Jones Construction Company	Panama City, Florida	United States	For War Shipping Administration.
11 April	Sambanka	Liberty ship	New England Shipbuilding Company	South Portland, Maine	United States	For Ministry of War Transport.
11 April	South Africa Victory	Victory ship	Oregon Shipbuilding Company	Portland, Oregon	United States	For War Shipping Administration.
11 April	Thomas F. Flaherty	Liberty ship	Permanente Metals, #2 Yard	Richmond, California	United States	For War Shipping Administration.
11 April	Lunga Point	Casablanca-class escort carrier	Kaiser Shipyards	Vancouver, Washington	United States	Converted S4 merchant hull, for United States Navy
12 April	CHANT 65	CHANT	Furness Shipbuilding Co. Ltd.	Haverton Hill-on-Tees	United Kingdom	For Ministry of War Transport.
12 April	Devis	Cargo ship	Harland & Wolff	Belfast	United Kingdom	For Lamport & Holt.
12 April	K497	Castle-class corvette	Harland & Wolff	Belfast	United Kingdom	For Royal Navy.
12 April	Welsh Prince	Cargo ship	William Doxford & Sons Ltd.	Pallion	United Kingdom	For Hain Steamship Co. Ltd.
13 April	Robert S. Abbott	Liberty ship	Permanente Metals, #2 Yard	Richmond, California	United States	For War Shipping Administration.
13 April	TID 80	TID-class tug	Richard Dunston Ltd.	Thorne	United Kingdom	For the Admiralty.
13 April	W. C. Latta	Liberty ship	Delta Shipbuilding Company	New Orleans, Louisiana	United States	For War Shipping Administration.
14 April	Benjamin Carpenter	Liberty ship	Permanente Metals, #2 Yard	Richmond, California	United States	For War Shipping Administration.
14 April	Julius Olsen	Liberty ship	Todd Houston Shipbuilding Corporation	Houston, Texas	United States	For War Shipping Administration.
14 April	Loch Alvie	Loch-class frigate	Barclay, Curle & Co. Ltd.	Glasgow	United Kingdom	For Royal Navy.
14 April	Martin Johnson	Liberty ship	California Shipbuilding Corporation	Los Angeles, California	United States	For War Shipping Administration.
14 April	Samconstant	Liberty ship	Bethlehem-Fairfield Shipyards	Baltimore, Maryland	United States	For Ministry of War Transport.
14 April	William D. Hoxie	Liberty ship	Southeastern Shipbuilding Corporation	Savannah, Georgia	United States	For War Shipping Administration.
15 April	Charlotte Cushman	Liberty ship	Permanente Metals, #2 Yard	Richmond, California	United States	For War Shipping Administration.
15 April	Kalliope	Hansa A Type cargo ship	NV Koninklijk Maatschappij de Schelde	Vlissingen	Netherlands	For Neptun Line
15 April	Richard K. Call	Liberty ship	St. Johns River Shipbuilding Company	Jacksonville, Florida	United States	For War Shipping Administration.
15 April	VIC 31	VIC lighter	Isaac Pimblott & Sons Ltd.	Northwich	United Kingdom	For the Admiralty.
15 April	Yugoslavia Victory	Victory ship	Oregon Shipbuilding Company	Portland, Oregon	United States	For War Shipping Administration.
16 April	Samselbu	Liberty ship	J. A. Jones Construction Company	Brunswick, Georgia	United States	For Ministry of War Transport.
17 April	Bismarck Sea	Casablanca-class escort carrier	Kaiser Shipyards	Vancouver, Washington	United States	Converted S4 merchant hull, for United States Navy
17 April	Edwin A. Stevens	Liberty ship	Delta Shipbuilding Company	New Orleans, Louisiana	United States	For War Shipping Administration.
17 April	Francis D. Culkin	Liberty ship	Bethlehem-Fairfield Shipyards	Baltimore, Maryland	United States	For War Shipping Administration.
17 April	Henry Meiggs	Liberty ship	Permanente Metals, #2 Yard	Richmond, California	United States	For War Shipping Administration.
17 April	Mission San Gabriel	T2 tanker	Marinship Corporation	Sausalito, California	United States	For United States Maritime Commission.
17 April	U-2321	Type XXIII submarine	Deutsche Werft AG	Hamburg	Germany	For Kriegsmarine
17 April	Wilson's Creek	T2 Tanker	Alabama Drydock and Shipbuilding Company	Mobile, Alabama	United States	For War Shipping Administration.
17 April	Wood Lake	T2 Tanker	Alabama Drydock and Shipbuilding Company	Mobile, Alabama	United States	For War Shipping Administration.
18 April	George Eldridge	Liberty ship	New England Shipbuilding Company	South Portland, Maine	United States	For War Shipping Administration.
18 April	TID 81	TID-class tug	Richard Dunston Ltd.	Thorne	United Kingdom	For the Admiralty.
19 April	Felipi De Bastrop	Liberty ship	Todd Houston Shipbuilding Corporation	Houston, Texas	United States	For War Shipping Administration.
19 April	Mariscal Sucre	Liberty ship	Permanente Metals, #2 Yard	Richmond, California	United States	For War Shipping Administration.
19 April	Raymond B. Stevens	Liberty ship	New England Shipbuilding Company	South Portland, Maine	United States	For War Shipping Administration.
19 April	Samoresby	Liberty ship	New England Shipbuilding Company	South Portland, Maine	United States	For Ministry of War Transport.
19 April	Samwake	Liberty ship	New England Shipbuilding Company	South Portland, Maine	United States	For Ministry of War Transport.
19 April	U-3501	Type XXI submarine	Schichau-Werke	Danzig	Germany	For Kriegsmarine
20 April	August Belmont	Liberty ship	St. Johns River Shipbuilding Company	Jacksonville, Florida	United States	For War Shipping Administration.
20 April	Charles W. Wooster	Liberty ship	Delta Shipbuilding Company	New Orleans, Louisiana	United States	For War Shipping Administration.
20 April	Empire Talisman	Cargo ship	Lithgows Ltd.	Port Glasgow	United Kingdom	For Ministry of War Transport.
20 April	Ethiopia Victory	Victory ship	Permanente Metals, #1 Yard	Richmond, California	United States	For War Shipping Administration.
20 April	George Clement Perkins	Liberty ship	Permanente Metals, #2 Yard	Richmond, California	United States	For War Shipping Administration.
20 April	Plymouth Victory	Victory ship	Oregon Shipbuilding Company	Portland, Oregon	United States	For War Shipping Administration.
20 April	Samleyte	Liberty ship	J. A. Jones Construction Company	Brunswick, Georgia	United States	For Ministry of War Transport.
20 April	Samloyal	Liberty ship	Bethlehem-Fairfield Shipyards	Baltimore, Maryland	United States	For Ministry of War Transport.
20 April	Squirrel	Algerine-class minesweeper	Harland & Wolff	Belfast	United Kingdom	For Royal Navy.
21 April	Empire Paladin	Wave-class oiler	Furness Shipbuilding Co. Ltd.	Haverton Hill-on-Tees	United Kingdom	For Ministry of War Transport.
21 April	TID 82	TID-class tug	Richard Dunston Ltd.	Thorne	United Kingdom	For the War Department.
22 April	Atchison Victory	Victory ship	California Shipbuilding Corporation	Los Angeles, California	United States	For War Shipping Administration.
22 April	Empire Julia	Improved Larch-class tug	Clelands (Successors) Ltd.	Wallsend	United Kingdom	For the Admiralty.
22 April	Gilbert M. Hitchcock	Liberty ship	Permanente Metals, #2 Yard	Richmond, California	United States	For War Shipping Administration.
22 April	James H. Kimball	Liberty ship	J. A. Jones Construction Company	Panama City, Florida	United States	For War Shipping Administration.
22 April	Samadang	Liberty ship	New England Shipbuilding Company	South Portland, Maine	United States	For Ministry of War Transport.
22 April	Samglory	Liberty ship	Bethlehem-Fairfield Shipyards	Baltimore, Maryland	United States	For Ministry of War Transport.
22 April	Samwinged	Liberty ship	Bethlehem-Fairfield Shipyards	Baltimore, Maryland	United States	For Ministry of War Transport.
22 April	Salamaua	Casablanca-class escort carrier	Kaiser Shipyards	Vancouver, Washington	United States	Converted S4 merchant hull, for United States Navy
22 April	Empire Julia	Tug	Clelands (Successors) Ltd	Willington Quay-on-Tyne	United Kingdom	For Ministry of War Transport
23 April	Henry White	Liberty ship	Permanente Metals, #2 Yard	Richmond, California	United States	For War Shipping Administration.
23 April	Samcebu	Liberty ship	Southeastern Shipbuilding Corporation	Savannah, Georgia	United States	For Ministry of War Transport.
24 April	Scottish Prince	Cargo ship	Burntisland Shipbuilding Company	Burntisland	United Kingdom	For Prince Line Ltd.
25 April	Amsterdam	Cleveland-class cruiser	Newport News Shipbuilding & Drydock Company	Newport News, Virginia	United States	For United States Navy
25 April	Emmet D. Boyle	Liberty ship	Permanente Metals, #2 Yard	Richmond, California	United States	For War Shipping Administration.
25 April	Empire Irving	Cargo ship	William Gray & Co. Ltd.	West Hartlepool	United Kingdom	For Ministry of War Transport.
25 April	Empire Jane	Near-Warrior type tug	A. Hall & Co. Ltd.	Aberdeen	United Kingdom	For Ministry of War Transport.
25 April	Empire Peggoty	Icemaid type collier	Grangemouth Dockyard Co. Ltd.	Grangemouth	United Kingdom	For Ministry of War Transport.
25 April	Joplin Victory	Victory ship	California Shipbuilding Corporation	Los Angeles, California	United States	For War Shipping Administration.
25 April	Niantic Victory	Victory ship	Oregon Shipbuilding Company	Portland, Oregon	United States	For War Shipping Administration.
25 April	Richard O'Brien	Liberty ship	Todd Houston Shipbuilding Corporation	Houston, Texas	United States	For War Shipping Administration.
25 April	Samfleet	Liberty ship	Bethlehem-Fairfield Shipyards	Baltimore, Maryland	United States	For Ministry of War Transport.
25 April	Trevose	Cargo ship	William Doxford & Sons Ltd.	Pallion	United Kingdom	For Hain Steamship Co. Ltd.
26 April	CHANT 27	CHANT	Goole Shipbuilding & Repairing Co. Ltd.	Goole	United Kingdom	For Ministry of War Transport.
26 April	Mission Dolores	T2 tanker	Marinship Corporation	Sausalito, California	United States	For United States Maritime Commission.
26 April	Samfaithful	Liberty ship	Bethlehem-Fairfield Shipyards	Baltimore, Maryland	United States	For Ministry of War Transport.
26 April	TID 83	TID-class tug	Richard Dunston Ltd.	Thorne	United Kingdom	For the United States Army.
27 April	Alexander Woolcott	Liberty ship	Permanente Metals, #2 Yard	Richmond, California	United States	For War Shipping Administration.
27 April	Arthur R. Lewis	Liberty ship	St. Johns River Shipbuilding Company	Jacksonville, Florida	United States	For War Shipping Administration.
27 April	Lincoln Victory	Victory ship	California Shipbuilding Corporation	Los Angeles, California	United States	For War Shipping Administration.
27 April	VIC 49	VIC lighter	Isaac Pimblott & Sons Ltd.	Northwich	United Kingdom	For the Admiralty.
27 April	William Wheelwright	Liberty ship	Delta Shipbuilding Company	New Orleans, Louisiana	United States	For War Shipping Administration.
28 April	Beaver Dam	T2 Tanker	Alabama Drydock and Shipbuilding Company	Mobile, Alabama	United States	For War Shipping Administration.
28 April	E. A. Christenson	Liberty ship	Permanente Metals, #2 Yard	Richmond, California	United States	For War Shipping Administration.
28 April	O. B. Martin	Liberty ship	Todd Houston Shipbuilding Corporation	Houston, Texas	United States	For War Shipping Administration.
28 April	Samaustral	Liberty ship	J. A. Jones Construction Company	Brunswick, Georgia	United States	For Ministry of War Transport.
28 April	Stephen Furdek	Liberty ship	J. A. Jones Construction Company	Panama City, Florida	United States	For War Shipping Administration.
28 April	Hollandia	Casablanca-class escort carrier	Kaiser Shipyards	Vancouver, Washington	United States	Converted S4 merchant hull, for United States Navy
29 April	Australia Victory	Victory ship	Permanente Metals, #1 Yard	Richmond, California	United States	For War Shipping Administration.
29 April	Bon Homme Richard	Essex-class aircraft carrier	New York Navy Yard	New York City	United States	For United States Navy
29 April	Hadley F. Brown	Liberty ship	New England Shipbuilding Company	South Portland, Maine	United States	For War Shipping Administration.
29 April	Harry L. Glucksman	Liberty ship	Southeastern Shipbuilding Corporation	Savannah, Georgia	United States	For War Shipping Administration.
29 April	James Kerney	Liberty ship	Bethlehem-Fairfield Shipyards	Baltimore, Maryland	United States	For War Shipping Administration.
29 April	Rockland Victory	Victory ship	Oregon Shipbuilding Company	Portland, Oregon	United States	For War Shipping Administration.
29 April	Sapulpa Victory	Victory ship	California Shipbuilding Corporation	Los Angeles, California	United States	For War Shipping Administration.
29 April	TID 84	TID-class tug	Richard Dunston Ltd.	Thorne	United Kingdom	For Ministry of War Transport.
30 April	Henry J. Waters	Liberty ship	Permanente Metals, #2 Yard	Richmond, California	United States	For War Shipping Administration.
30 April	Samingoy	Liberty ship	J. A. Jones Construction Company	Brunswick, Georgia	United States	For Ministry of War Transport.
30 April	U-2322	Type XXIII submarine	Deutsche Werft AG	Hamburg	Germany	For Kriegsmarine
April	CHANT 7	CHANT	Henry Scarr Ltd.	Hessle	United Kingdom	For Ministry of War Transport.
April	CHANT 8	CHANT	Henry Scarr Ltd.	Hessle	United Kingdom	For Ministry of War Transport.
April	CHANT 9	CHANT	Henry Scarr Ltd.	Hessle	United Kingdom	For Ministry of War Transport.
April	CHANT 10	CHANT	Henry Scarr Ltd.	Hessle	United Kingdom	For Ministry of War Transport.
April	CHANT 28	CHANT	Goole Shipbuilding & Repairing Co. Ltd.	Goole	United Kingdom	For Ministry of War Transport.

== May ==
Date	Ship	Class / type	Builder	Location	Country	Notes
2 May	Claremont Victory	Victory ship	Oregon Shipbuilding Company	Portland, Oregon	United States	For War Shipping Administration.
2 May	Frank Adair Monroe	Liberty ship	Delta Shipbuilding Company	New Orleans, Louisiana	United States	For War Shipping Administration.
2 May	Navajo Victory	Victory ship	California Shipbuilding Corporation	Los Angeles, California	United States	For War Shipping Administration.
2 May	Samsoaring	Liberty ship	Bethlehem-Fairfield Shipyards	Baltimore, Maryland	United States	For Ministry of War Transport.
2 May	Empire Barnaby	Water carrier	W. J. Yarwood & Sons (1938) Ltd	Northwich	United Kingdom	For Ministry of War Transport
2 May	TID 85	TID-class tug	Richard Dunston Ltd.	Thorne	United Kingdom	For Ministry of War Transport.
3 May	Henry D. Lindsley	Liberty ship	Todd Houston Shipbuilding Corporation	Houston, Texas	United States	For War Shipping Administration.
3 May	William E. Ritter	Liberty ship	Permanente Metals, #2 Yard	Richmond, California	United States	For War Shipping Administration.
4 May	George E. Merrick	Liberty ship	St. Johns River Shipbuilding Company	Jacksonville, Florida	United States	For War Shipping Administration.
4 May	St. Joseph Bay	Commencement Bay-class escort carrier	Todd Pacific Shipyards	Tacoma, Washington	United States	For United States Navy
4 May	Kwajalein	Casablanca-class escort carrier	Kaiser Shipyards	Vancouver, Washington	United States	Converted S4 merchant hull, for United States Navy
5 May	Aaron Ward	Allen M. Sumner-class destroyer	Bethlehem Steel	San Pedro, California	United States	For United States Navy; sponsored by Mrs. G. H. Ratliff; converted into a Robert H. Smith-class destroyer minelayer
5 May	Cranston Victory	Victory ship	Oregon Shipbuilding Company	Portland, Oregon	United States	For War Shipping Administration.
5 May	Jean Ribaut	Liberty ship	J. A. Jones Construction Company	Panama City, Florida	United States	For War Shipping Administration.
5 May	Joe Harris	Liberty ship	Permanente Metals, #2 Yard	Richmond, California	United States	For War Shipping Administration.
5 May	Samcrest	Liberty ship	Bethlehem-Fairfield Shipyards	Baltimore, Maryland	United States	For Ministry of War Transport.
5 May	U-2501	Type XXI submarine	Blohm + Voss	Hamburg	Germany	For Kriegsmarine
6 May	Chameleon	Algerine-class minesweeper	Harland & Wolff	Belfast	United Kingdom	For Royal Navy.
6 May	Empire Saturn	Ocean type tanker	Harland & Wolff	Belfast	United Kingdom	For Ministry of War Transport.
6 May	Mello Franco	Liberty ship	Permanente Metals, #2 Yard	Richmond, California	United States	For War Shipping Administration.
6 May	Samidway	Liberty ship	New England Shipbuilding Company	South Portland, Maine	United States	For Ministry of War Transport.
6 May	Samsuva	Liberty ship	New England Shipbuilding Company	South Portland, Maine	United States	For Ministry of War Transport.
6 May	TID 86	TID-class tug	Richard Dunston Ltd.	Thorne	United Kingdom	For Ministry of War Transport.
7 May	Mission Capistrano	T2 tanker	Marinship Corporation	Sausalito, California	United States	For United States Maritime Commission.
8 May	Callabee	T2 Tanker	Alabama Drydock and Shipbuilding Company	Mobile, Alabama	United States	For War Shipping Administration.
8 May	James D. Trask	Liberty ship	Bethlehem-Fairfield Shipyards	Baltimore, Maryland	United States	For War Shipping Administration.
8 May	Minor C. Keith	Liberty ship	Todd Houston Shipbuilding Corporation	Houston, Texas	United States	For War Shipping Administration.
8 May	William Allen White	Liberty ship	Permanente Metals, #2 Yard	Richmond, California	United States	For War Shipping Administration.
8 May	Empire Nicholas	Modified Warrior-type tug	John Crown & Sons Ltd.	Sunderland	United Kingdom	For Ministry of War Transport.
9 May	Bluefield Victory	Victory ship	California Shipbuilding Corporation	Los Angeles, California	United States	For War Shipping Administration.
9 May	Chanda	Cargo ship	Barclay, Curle & Co. Ltd.	Glasgow	United Kingdom	For British India Steam Navigation Company.
9 May	CHANT 42	CHANT	Furness Shipbuilding Co. Ltd.	Haverton Hill-on-Tees	United Kingdom	For Ministry of War Transport.
9 May	Empire Christopher	Near-Warrior type tug	Cochrane & Sons Ltd.	Selby	United Kingdom	For Ministry of War Transport.
9 May	John Chester Kendall	Liberty ship	New England Shipbuilding Company	South Portland, Maine	United States	For War Shipping Administration.
9 May	Rutland Victory	Victory ship	Oregon Shipbuilding Company	Portland, Oregon	United States	For War Shipping Administration.
10 May	Admiralty Islands	Casablanca-class escort carrier	Kaiser Shipyards	Vancouver, Washington	United States	Converted S4 merchant hull, for United States Navy
10 May	CHANT 43	CHANT	Furness Shipbuilding Co. Ltd.	Haverton Hill-on-Tees	United Kingdom	For Ministry of War Transport.
10 May	CHANT 50	CHANT	Goole Shipbuilding & Repairing Co. Ltd.	Goole	United Kingdom	For Ministry of War Transport.
10 May	Empire Josephine	Near-Warrior type tug	Cochrane & Sons Ltd.	Selby	United Kingdom	For Ministry of War Transport.
10 May	Samfreedom	Liberty ship	Bethlehem-Fairfield Shipyards	Baltimore, Maryland	United States	For Ministry of War Transport.
10 May	Stephen Hopkins	Liberty ship	Permanente Metals, #2 Yard	Richmond, California	United States	For War Shipping Administration.
10 May	TID 87	TID-class tug	Richard Dunston Ltd.	Thorne	United Kingdom	For Ministry of War Transport.
11 May	Cecil G. Sellers	Liberty ship	Permanente Metals, #2 Yard	Richmond, California	United States	For War Shipping Administration.
11 May	Empire Swordsman	Cargo ship	William Hamilton & Co. Ltd.	Port Glasgow	United Kingdom	For the Ministry of War Transport.
11 May	Luray Victory	Victory ship	California Shipbuilding Corporation	Los Angeles, California	United States	For War Shipping Administration.
11 May	Mona Island	Liberty ship	Bethlehem-Fairfield Shipyards	Baltimore, Maryland	United States	For War Shipping Administration.
11 May	Nicholas D. Labadie	Liberty ship	Todd Houston Shipbuilding Corporation	Houston, Texas	United States	For War Shipping Administration.
12 May	Elmira Victory	Victory ship	Oregon Shipbuilding Company	Portland, Oregon	United States	For War Shipping Administration.
12 May	James K. Paulding	Liberty ship	St. Johns River Shipbuilding Company	Jacksonville, Florida	United States	For War Shipping Administration.
12 May	Juliette Low	Liberty ship	Southeastern Shipbuilding Corporation	Savannah, Georgia	United States	For War Shipping Administration.
12 May	LeBaron Russell Briggs	Liberty ship	J. A. Jones Construction Company	Panama City, Florida	United States	For War Shipping Administration.
12 May	Samtruth	Liberty ship	Bethlehem-Fairfield Shipyards	Baltimore, Maryland	United States	For Ministry of War Transport.
13 May	Norman J. Colman	Liberty ship	Permanente Metals, #2 Yard	Richmond, California	United States	For War Shipping Administration.
14 May	Samlorian	Liberty ship	J. A. Jones Construction Company	Brunswick, Georgia	United States	For Ministry of War Transport.
15 May	Alexander W. Doniphan	Liberty ship	Delta Shipbuilding Company	New Orleans, Louisiana	United States	For War Shipping Administration.
15 May	Arthur St. Clair	Liberty ship	Todd Houston Shipbuilding Corporation	Houston, Texas	United States	For War Shipping Administration.
15 May	Empire Dombey	Coastal tanker	A & J Inglis Ltd	Glasgow	United Kingdom	For Ministry of War Transport
15 May	India Victory	Victory ship	Permanente Metals, #1 Yard	Richmond, California	United States	For War Shipping Administration.
15 May	Marshfield Victory	Victory ship	Oregon Shipbuilding Company	Portland, Oregon	United States	For War Shipping Administration.
15 May	TID 88	TID-class tug	Richard Dunston Ltd.	Thorne	United Kingdom	For Ministry of War Transport.
15 May	William Sproule	Liberty ship	Permanente Metals, #2 Yard	Richmond, California	United States	For War Shipping Administration.
16 May	Amasa Delano	Liberty ship	Delta Shipbuilding Company	New Orleans, Louisiana	United States	For War Shipping Administration.
16 May	Joseph I. Kemp	Liberty ship	New England Shipbuilding Company	South Portland, Maine	United States	For War Shipping Administration.
16 May	Robert W. Bingham	Liberty ship	Delta Shipbuilding Company	New Orleans, Louisiana	United States	For War Shipping Administration.
16 May	Bougainville	Casablanca-class escort carrier	Kaiser Shipyards	Vancouver, Washington	United States	Converted S4 merchant hull, for United States Navy
17 May	George Crile	Liberty ship	Permanente Metals, #2 Yard	Richmond, California	United States	For War Shipping Administration.
17 May	Rufus Choate	Liberty ship	Todd Houston Shipbuilding Corporation	Houston, Texas	United States	For War Shipping Administration.
17 May	Samtorch	Liberty ship	Bethlehem-Fairfield Shipyards	Baltimore, Maryland	United States	For Ministry of War Transport.
17 May	TID 89	TID-class tug	Richard Dunston Ltd.	Thorne	United Kingdom	For the Admiralty.
18 May	Howard Gray	Liberty ship	J. A. Jones Construction Company	Panama City, Florida	United States	For War Shipping Administration.
18 May	Mission Santa Clara	T2 tanker	Marinship Corporation	Sausalito, California	United States	For United States Maritime Commission.
18 May	Thomas J. Lyons	Liberty ship	St. Johns River Shipbuilding Company	Jacksonville, Florida	United States	For War Shipping Administration.
19 May	Empire Gambia	Cargo ship	Harland & Wolff	Govan	United Kingdom	For Ministry of War Transport.
19 May	Nampa Victory	Victory ship	Oregon Shipbuilding Company	Portland, Oregon	United States	For War Shipping Administration.
19 May	Ralph T. O'Neil	Liberty ship	Permanente Metals, #2 Yard	Richmond, California	United States	
19 May	Samlistar	Liberty ship	Bethlehem-Fairfield Shipyards	Baltimore, Maryland	United States	For Ministry of War Transport.
19 May	San Juan Hill	T2 Tanker	Alabama Drydock and Shipbuilding Company	Mobile, Alabama	United States	For War Shipping Administration.
20 May	Empire Salisbury	Wave-class oiler	Sir J. Laing & Sons Ltd.	Sunderland	United Kingdom	For Ministry of War Transport. Completed as RFA Wave Baron for Royal Fleet Auxiliary.
20 May	George Hawley	Liberty ship	New England Shipbuilding Company	South Portland, Maine	United States	For War Shipping Administration.
20 May	Samoland	Liberty ship	J. A. Jones Construction Company	Brunswick, Georgia	United States	For Ministry of War Transport.
20 May	Samsmola	Liberty ship	New England Shipbuilding Company	South Portland, Maine	United States	For Ministry of War Transport.
20 May	Warrior	Colossus-class aircraft carrier	Harland and Wolff	Belfast	United Kingdom	
21 May	George B. McFarland	Liberty ship	Permanente Metals, #2 Yard	Richmond, California	United States	For War Shipping Administration.
22 May	Cheerful	Algerine-class minesweeper	Harland & Wolff	Belfast	United Kingdom	For Royal Navy.
22 May	Dumaran	Liberty ship	Bethlehem-Fairfield Shipyards	Baltimore, Maryland	United States	For War Shipping Administration.
22 May	Empire Dynasty	Standard Fast type cargo liner	J. L. Thompson & Sons Ltd.	Sunderland, Co Durham	United Kingdom	For Ministry of War Transport.
22 May	Empire Mull	Coastal tanker	Grangemouth Dockyard Co	Grangemouth	United Kingdom	For Ministry of War Transport
22 May	Empire Perlis	Empire Malta-class Scandinavian type cargo ship	William Gray & Co. Ltd.	West Hartlepool	United Kingdom	For Ministry of War Transport.
22 May	Empire Rosebury	Empire Pym type tanker	Blythswood Shipbuilding Co. Ltd.	Glasgow	United Kingdom	For Ministry of War Transport.
22 May	Francis S. Bartow	Liberty ship	Southeastern Shipbuilding Corporation	Savannah, Georgia	United States	For War Shipping Administration.
22 May	George W. Alther	Liberty ship	Delta Shipbuilding Company	New Orleans, Louisiana	United States	For War Shipping Administration.
22 May	Gus W. Darnell	Liberty ship	Todd Houston Shipbuilding Corporation	Houston, Texas	United States	For War Shipping Administration.
22 May	Joseph Squires	Liberty ship	New England Shipbuilding Company	South Portland, Maine	United States	For War Shipping Administration.
22 May	Raymond Clapper	Liberty ship	St. Johns River Shipbuilding Company	Jacksonville, Florida	United States	
22 May	Samspeed	Liberty ship	Bethlehem-Fairfield Shipyards	Baltimore, Maryland	United States	For Ministry of War Transport.
22 May	Matanikau	Casablanca-class escort carrier	Kaiser Shipyards	Vancouver, Washington	United States	Converted S4 merchant hull, for United States Navy
22 May	TID 92	TID-class tug	Richard Dunston Ltd.	Thorne	United Kingdom	For the Admiralty.
23 May	Empire Albion	Standard Fast type Cargo liner	Caledon Shipbuilding & Engineering Co. Ltd.	Dundee	United Kingdom	For Ministry of War Transport. Completed as Terborch for Dutch Government.
23 May	Empire Tudor	Cargo ship	Shipbuilding Corporation Ltd.	Sunderland	United Kingdom	For Ministry of War Transport.
23 May	Loch Craggie	Loch-class frigate	Harland & Wolff	Belfast	United Kingdom	For Royal Navy.
23 May	Silverbow Victory	Victory ship	Oregon Shipbuilding Company	Portland, Oregon	United States	For War Shipping Administration.
23 May	William H. Clagett	Liberty ship	Permanente Metals, #2 Yard	Richmond, California	United States	For War Shipping Administration.
24 May	CHANT 44	CHANT	Furness Shipbuilding Co. Ltd.	Haverton Hill-on-Tees	United Kingdom	For Ministry of War Transport.
24 May	Greenville Victory	Victory ship	California Shipbuilding Corporation	Los Angeles, California	United States	For War Shipping Administration.
24 May	H. H. Raymond	Liberty ship	J. A. Jones Construction Company	Panama City, Florida	United States	For War Shipping Administration.
24 May	Samuel F. B. Morse	Liberty ship	Bethlehem-Fairfield Shipyards	Baltimore, Maryland	United States	For War Shipping Administration.
24 May	Empire Gillian	Coaster	Richards Ironworks Ltd.	Lowestoft	United Kingdom	For Ministry of War Transport.
24 May	Loch Fyne	Loch-class frigate	Burntisland Shipbuilding Company	Burntisland	United Kingdom	For Royal Navy.
25 May	CHANT 45	CHANT	Furness Shipbuilding Co. Ltd.	Haverton Hill-on-Tees	United Kingdom	For Ministry of War Transport.
25 May	Donald W. Bain	Liberty ship	J. A. Jones Construction Company	Brunswick, Georgia	United States	For War Shipping Administration.
25 May	Jose Pedro Varela	Liberty ship	Permanente Metals, #2 Yard	Richmond, California	United States	For War Shipping Administration.
25 May	Norman Queen	Coaster	Ardrossan Dockyard Ltd.	Ardrossan	United Kingdom	For British Channel Islands Shipping Co. Ltd.
26 May	Durham Victory	Victory ship	California Shipbuilding Corporation	Los Angeles, California	United States	For War Shipping Administration.
26 May	Eleazar Lord	Liberty ship	Todd Houston Shipbuilding Corporation	Houston, Texas	United States	For War Shipping Administration.
26 May	Mandan Victory	Victory ship	Oregon Shipbuilding Company	Portland, Oregon	United States	For War Shipping Administration.
26 May	Michael Ferdinand	Hansa A type cargo ship	Stettiner Oderwerke	Stettin	Germany	For Hugo Ferdinand Dampschiffs Reederi
27 May	Attu	Casablanca-class escort carrier	Kaiser Shipyards	Vancouver, Washington	United States	Converted S4 merchant hull, for United States Navy
27 May	Samluzon	Liberty ship	Bethlehem-Fairfield Shipyards	Baltimore, Maryland	United States	For Ministry of War Transport.
27 May	Samuel L. Cobb	Liberty ship	Permanente Metals, #2 Yard	Richmond, California	United States	For War Shipping Administration.
28 May	Mission Buenaventura	T2 tanker	Marinship Corporation	Sausalito, California	United States	For United States Maritime Commission.
28 May	TID 93	TID-class tug	Richard Dunston Ltd.	Thorne	United Kingdom	For the Admiralty.
29 May	Cahawba	T2 Tanker	Alabama Drydock and Shipbuilding Company	Mobile, Alabama	United States	For War Shipping Administration.
29 May	Edward P. Ripley	Liberty ship	Permanente Metals, #2 Yard	Richmond, California	United States	For War Shipping Administration.
29 May	Kingsport Victory	Victory ship	California Shipbuilding Corporation	Los Angeles, California	United States	For War Shipping Administration.
30 May	Aberdeen Victory	Victory ship	Oregon Shipbuilding Company	Portland, Oregon	United States	For War Shipping Administration.
30 May	Bear Paw	T2 Tanker	Alabama Drydock and Shipbuilding Company	Mobile, Alabama	United States	For War Shipping Administration.
30 May	Samtana	Liberty ship	Bethlehem-Fairfield Shipyards	Baltimore, Maryland	United States	For Ministry of War Transport.
30 May	U-3001	Type XXI submarine	AG Weser	Bremen	Germany	For Kriegsmarine
31 May	Charles J. Colden	Liberty ship	Permanente Metals, #2 Yard	Richmond, California	United States	For War Shipping Administration.
31 May	Hugh J. Kilpatrick	Liberty ship	St. Johns River Shipbuilding Company	Jacksonville, Florida	United States	For War Shipping Administration.
31 May	Jacob Sloat Fassett	Liberty ship	Southeastern Shipbuilding Corporation	Savannah, Georgia	United States	For War Shipping Administration.
31 May	Juan N. Seguin	Liberty ship	Todd Houston Shipbuilding Corporation	Houston, Texas	United States	For War Shipping Administration.
31 May	U-2323	Type XXIII submarine	Deutsche Werft AG	Hamburg	Germany	For Kriegsmarine
May	CHANT 11	CHANT	Henry Scarr Ltd.	Hessle	United Kingdom	For Ministry of War Transport.
May	CHANT 51	CHANT	Goole Shipbuilding & Repairing Co. Ltd.	Goole	United Kingdom	For Ministry of War Transport.
May	Empire Factor	Empire F type coaster	Goole Shipbuilding & Repairing Co. Ltd	Goole	United Kingdom	For Ministry of War Transport.

== June ==
Date	Ship	Class / type	Builder	Location	Country	Notes
1 June	TID 94	TID-class tug	Richard Dunston Ltd.	Thorne	United Kingdom	For the Admiralty.
2 June	Henry T. Scott	Liberty ship	Permanente Metals, #2 Yard	Richmond, California	United States	For War Shipping Administration.
2 June	Walker D. Hines	Liberty ship	Delta Shipbuilding Company	New Orleans, Louisiana	United States	For War Shipping Administration.
3 June	Beloit Victory	Victory ship	Oregon Shipbuilding Company	Portland, Oregon	United States	For War Shipping Administration.
3 June	Harriet Tubman	Liberty ship	New England Shipbuilding Company	South Portland, Maine	United States	For War Shipping Administration.
3 June	Samskern	Liberty ship	Bethlehem-Fairfield Shipyards	Baltimore, Maryland	United States	For Ministry of War Transport.
4 June	Bertram G. Goodhue	Liberty ship	Todd Houston Shipbuilding Corporation	Houston, Texas	United States	For War Shipping Administration.
5 June	M. Michael Edelstein	Liberty ship	J. A. Jones Construction Company	Panama City, Florida	United States	For War Shipping Administration.
5 June	Samindoro	Liberty ship	Bethlehem-Fairfield Shipyards	Baltimore, Maryland	United States	For Ministry of War Transport.
5 June	TID 95	TID-class tug	Richard Dunston Ltd.	Thorne	United Kingdom	For Ministry of War Transport.
6 June	Dalton Victory	Victory ship	California Shipbuilding Corporation	Los Angeles, California	United States	For War Shipping Administration.
6 June	Iraq Victory	Victory ship	Permanente Metals, #1 Yard	Richmond, California	United States	For War Shipping Administration.
6 June	Oliver Loving	Liberty ship	Todd Houston Shipbuilding Corporation	Houston, Texas	United States	For War Shipping Administration.
6 June	Rooks	Fletcher-class destroyer		Seattle-Tacoma	United States	For United States Navy
7 June	Escanaba Victory	Victory ship	Oregon Shipbuilding Company	Portland, Oregon	United States	For War Shipping Administration.
7 June	Joseph Augustin Chevalier	Liberty ship	New England Shipbuilding Company	South Portland, Maine	United States	For War Shipping Administration.
7 June	Miaoulis	Liberty ship	New England Shipbuilding Company	South Portland, Maine	United States	For War Shipping Administration.
7 June	Ovid Butler	Liberty ship	Permanente Metals, #2 Yard	Richmond, California	United States	For War Shipping Administration.
7 June	William Hodson	Liberty ship	Bethlehem-Fairfield Shipyards	Baltimore, Maryland	United States	For War Shipping Administration.
7 June	William Leavitt	Liberty ship	New England Shipbuilding Company	South Portland, Maine	United States	For War Shipping Administration.
8 June	Empire Moulmein	Cargo ship	John Readhead & Sons Ltd.	South Shields	United Kingdom	For Ministry of War Transport.
8 June	Loch Gorm	Loch-class frigate	Harland & Wolff	Belfast	United Kingdom	For Royal Navy.
8 June	Maiden Castle	Castle-class corvette	Fleming & Ferguson Ltd.	Paisley	United Kingdom	For Royal Navy. Completed asEmpire Lifeguard for Ministry of War Transport.
8 June	Mission Santa Barbara	T2 tanker	Marinship Corporation	Sausalito, California	United States	For United States Maritime Commission.
8 June	Noah Brown	Liberty ship	St. Johns River Shipbuilding Company	Jacksonville, Florida	United States	For War Shipping Administration.
8 June	Richard Upjohn	Liberty ship	Southeastern Shipbuilding Corporation	Savannah, Georgia	United States	For War Shipping Administration.
8 June	Munda	Casablanca-class escort carrier	Kaiser Shipyards	Vancouver, Washington	United States	Converted S4 merchant hull, for United States Navy
8 June	Empire Barkis	Coastal tanker	Rowhedge Ironworks Ltd	Rowhedge	United Kingdom	For Ministry of War Transport.
9 June	Gainesville Victory	Victory ship	California Shipbuilding Corporation	Los Angeles, California	United States	For War Shipping Administration.
9 June	Jay Cooke	Liberty ship	Permanente Metals, #2 Yard	Richmond, California	United States	For War Shipping Administration.
9 June	TID 96	TID-class tug	Richard Dunston Ltd.	Thorne	United Kingdom	For Ministry of War Transport.
10 June	Augustine B. McManus	Liberty ship	J. A. Jones Construction Company	Brunswick, Georgia	United States	For War Shipping Administration.
10 June	Empire Malacca	Cargo ship	William Gray & Co. Ltd.	West Hartlepool	United Kingdom	For Ministry of War Transport.
10 June	Ernest W. Gibson	Liberty ship	New England Shipbuilding Company	South Portland, Maine	United States	For War Shipping Administration.
10 June	Hibbing Victory	Victory ship	Oregon Shipbuilding Company	Portland, Oregon	United States	For War Shipping Administration.
10 June	Samnegros	Liberty ship	Bethlehem-Fairfield Shipyards	Baltimore, Maryland	United States	For Ministry of War Transport.
10 June	Samsylarna	Liberty ship	Bethlehem-Fairfield Shipyards	Baltimore, Maryland	United States	For Ministry of War Transport.
10 June	Block Island	Commencement Bay-class escort carrier	Todd Pacific Shipyards	Tacoma, Washington	United States	For United States Navy
12 June	Andrew W. Preston	Liberty ship	Todd Houston Shipbuilding Corporation	Houston, Texas	United States	For War Shipping Administration.
12 June	Floristan	Cargo ship	William Doxford & Sons Ltd.	Pallion	United Kingdom	For Strick Line (1923) Ltd.
13 June	Carroll Victory	Victory ship	California Shipbuilding Corporation	Los Angeles, California	United States	For War Shipping Administration.
13 June	Terry E. Stephenson	Liberty ship	Permanente Metals, #2 Yard	Richmond, California	United States	For War Shipping Administration.
13 June	TID 90	TID-class tug	Richard Dunston Ltd.	Thorne	United Kingdom	For the Admiralty.
13 June	William D. Bloxham	Liberty ship	J. A. Jones Construction Company	Panama City, Florida	United States	For War Shipping Administration.
14 June	Hendrik Willem Van Loon	Liberty ship	St. Johns River Shipbuilding Company	Jacksonville, Florida	United States	For War Shipping Administration.
14 June	Joliet Victory	Victory ship	Oregon Shipbuilding Company	Portland, Oregon	United States	For War Shipping Administration.
14 June	Samlamu	Liberty ship	Bethlehem-Fairfield Shipyards	Baltimore, Maryland	United States	For Ministry of War Transport.
14 June	Sarasota	Haskell-class attack transport	Permanente Metals, #2 Yard	Richmond, California	United States	For United States Navy.
15 June	Nathaniel Scudder	Liberty ship	Todd Houston Shipbuilding Corporation	Houston, Texas	United States	For War Shipping Administration.
15 June	William G. Lee	Liberty ship	Southeastern Shipbuilding Corporation	Savannah, Georgia	United States	For War Shipping Administration.
15 June	U-2502	Type XXI submarine	Blohm + Voss	Hamburg	Germany	For Kriegsmarine
16 June	Adamsturm	Hansa A Type cargo ship	Deutsche Werft	Hamburg	Germany	For Deutsche Dampfschifffarts-Gesellschaft Hansa
16 June	Aram J. Pothier	Liberty ship	New England Shipbuilding Company	South Portland, Maine	United States	For War Shipping Administration.
16 June	Dexter W. Fellows	Liberty ship	Bethlehem-Fairfield Shipyards	Baltimore, Maryland	United States	For War Shipping Administration.
16 June	Horseshoe	T2 Tanker	Alabama Drydock and Shipbuilding Company	Mobile, Alabama	United States	For War Shipping Administration.
16 June	Platte Bridge	T2 Tanker	Alabama Drydock and Shipbuilding Company	Mobile, Alabama	United States	For War Shipping Administration.
16 June	Selma Victory	Victory ship	California Shipbuilding Corporation	Los Angeles, California	United States	For War Shipping Administration.
16 June	Thomas F. Hunt	Liberty ship	Permanente Metals, #2 Yard	Richmond, California	United States	For War Shipping Administration.
16 June	TID 91	TID-class tug	Richard Dunston Ltd.	Thorne	United Kingdom	For the Admiralty.
16 June	U-2324	Type XXIII submarine	Deutsche Werft AG	Hamburg	Germany	For Kriegsmarine
17 June	Costa Rica Victory	Victory ship	Permanente Metals, #1 Yard	Richmond, California	United States	For War Shipping Administration.
17 June	George E. Goodfellow	Liberty ship	Permanente Metals, #2 Yard	Richmond, California	United States	For War Shipping Administration.
17 June	Nick Stoner	Liberty ship	J. A. Jones Construction Company	Panama City, Florida	United States	For War Shipping Administration.
17 June	Quinault Victory	Victory ship	Oregon Shipbuilding Company	Portland, Oregon	United States	For War Shipping Administration.
17 June	VIC 44	VIC lighter	Richard Dunston Ltd.	Thorne	United Kingdom	For Ministry of War Transport.
17 June	VIC 50	VIC lighter	Isaac Pimblott & Sons Ltd.	Northwich	United Kingdom	For the Admiralty.
18 June	Mission San Luis Obispo	T2 tanker	Marinship Corporation	Sausalito, California	United States	For United States Maritime Commission.
19 June	Cyrus Adler	Liberty ship	Delta Shipbuilding Company	New Orleans, Louisiana	United States	For War Shipping Administration.
19 June	James B. Duke	Liberty ship	J. A. Jones Construction Company	Brunswick, Georgia	United States	For War Shipping Administration.
19 June	John B. Hamilton	Liberty ship	Todd Houston Shipbuilding Corporation	Houston, Texas	United States	For War Shipping Administration.
19 June	Oakley Wood	Liberty ship	Bethlehem-Fairfield Shipyards	Baltimore, Maryland	United States	For War Shipping Administration.
19 June	Rayleigh Castle	Castle-class corvette	Ferguson Bros. Ltd.	Port Glasgow	United Kingdom	For Royal Navy. Completed as Empire Rest for Ministry of War Transport.
20 June	Assistance	Liberty ship	Bethlehem-Fairfield Shipyards	Baltimore, Maryland	United States	For War Shipping Administration.
20 June	Brockleymoor	Cargo ship	William Doxford & Sons Ltd.	Pallion	United Kingdom	For Moor Line Ltd.
20 June	Empire Haldane	Cargo ship	J. L. Thompson & Sons Ltd.	Sunderland	United Kingdom	For Ministry of War Transport.
20 June	Empire Lady	Cargo ship	Shipbuilding Corporation Ltd.	Newcastle upon Tyne	United Kingdom	For Ministry of War Transport.
20 June	Hare	Algerine-class minesweeper	Harland & Wolff	Belfast	United Kingdom	For Royal Navy.
20 June	Meridian Victory	Victory ship	California Shipbuilding Corporation	Los Angeles, California	United States	For War Shipping Administration.
20 June	Oconto	Haskell-class attack transport	Kaiser Company	Vancouver, Washington	United States	For United States Navy
20 June	Schauenberg	Hansa A Type cargo ship	Deutsche Werft	Hamburg	Germany	For Harald Schuldt & Co
21 June	Collin McKinney	Liberty ship	Delta Shipbuilding Company	New Orleans, Louisiana	United States	For War Shipping Administration.
21 June	Mediator	Bustler-class tug	Henry Robb Ltd.	Leith	United Kingdom	For the Admiralty.
21 June	Skagway Victory	Victory ship	Oregon Shipbuilding Company	Portland, Oregon	United States	For War Shipping Administration.
22 June	Empire Fairhaven	Empire F type coaster	Goole Shipbuilding & Repairing Co. Ltd	Goole	United Kingdom	For Ministry of War Transport.
22 June	Empire Rawlinson	Standard Fast type cargo liner	Lithgows Ltd.	Port Glasgow	United Kingdom	For Ministry of War Transport.
22 June	Ferdinand R. Hassler	Liberty ship	Delta Shipbuilding Company	New Orleans, Louisiana	United States	For War Shipping Administration.
22 June	Ruben Dario	Liberty ship	Southeastern Shipbuilding Corporation	Savannah, Georgia	United States	For War Shipping Administration.
22 June	TID 97	TID-class tug	Richard Dunston Ltd.	Thorne	United Kingdom	For the Admiralty.
22 June	W. P. Few	Liberty ship	J. A. Jones Construction Company	Brunswick, Georgia	United States	For War Shipping Administration.
22 June	William E. Dodd	Liberty ship	J. A. Jones Construction Company	Panama City, Florida	United States	For War Shipping Administration.
23 June	Clan Chisholm	Cargo ship	Greenock Dockyard Co. Ltd.	Greenock	United Kingdom	For the Clan Line Steamers Ltd.
23 June	Nathaniel Silsbee	Liberty ship	Todd Houston Shipbuilding Corporation	Houston, Texas	United States	For War Shipping Administration.
24 June	Joseph C. Lincoln	Liberty ship	New England Shipbuilding Company	South Portland, Maine	United States	For War Shipping Administration.
24 June	Sharon Victory	Victory ship	California Shipbuilding Corporation	Los Angeles, California	United States	For War Shipping Administration.
24 June	Stephen Beasley	Liberty ship	St. Johns River Shipbuilding Company	Jacksonville, Florida	United States	For War Shipping Administration.
24 June	Thomas H. Sumner	Liberty ship	New England Shipbuilding Company	South Portland, Maine	United States	For War Shipping Administration.
24 June	Empire Dockland	Hopper ship	William Simons & Co. Ltd.	Renfrew	United Kingdom	For Ministry of War Transport.
26 June	Justo Arosemena	Liberty ship	Permanente Metals, #2 Yard	Richmond, California	United States	For War Shipping Administration.
26 June	Pomona Victory	Victory ship	California Shipbuilding Corporation	Los Angeles, California	United States	For War Shipping Administration.
26 June	Sidney Wright	Liberty ship	Bethlehem-Fairfield Shipyards	Baltimore, Maryland	United States	For War Shipping Administration.
27 June	Augustus P. Loring	Liberty ship	New England Shipbuilding Company	South Portland, Maine	United States	For War Shipping Administration.
27 June	Cuba Victory	Victory ship	Permanente Metals, #1 Yard	Richmond, California	United States	For War Shipping Administration.
27 June	Empire Balfour	Refrigerated cargo ship	Lithgows Ltd	Port Glasgow	United Kingdom	For Ministry of War Transport
27 June	Robert Watchorn	Liberty ship	Todd Houston Shipbuilding Corporation	Houston, Texas	United States	For War Shipping Administration.
27 June	William S. Baer	Liberty ship	Bethlehem-Fairfield Shipyards	Baltimore, Maryland	United States	For War Shipping Administration.
28 June	Fort Dunvegan	Fort ship	Burrard Dry Dock Co. Ltd	North Vancouver, British Columbia	Canada	For Ministry of War Transport.
28 June	Grange Victory	Victory ship	California Shipbuilding Corporation	Los Angeles, California	United States	For War Shipping Administration.
28 June	Mission Loreto	T2 tanker	Marinship Corporation	Sausalito, California	United States	For United States Maritime Commission.
28 June	Samuel Gompers	Liberty ship	Permanente Metals, #2 Yard	Richmond, California	United States	For War Shipping Administration.
28 June	Randolph	Essex-class aircraft carrier	Newport News Shipbuilding	Newport News, Virginia	United States	For United States Navy
29 June	Benjamin Brown French	Liberty ship	Southeastern Shipbuilding Corporation	Savannah, Georgia	United States	For War Shipping Administration.
29 June	Mary Pickersgill	Liberty ship	Bethlehem-Fairfield Shipyards	Baltimore, Maryland	United States	For War Shipping Administration.
29 June	TID 98	TID-class tug	Richard Dunston Ltd.	Thorne	United Kingdom	For the Admiralty Ministry of War Transport.
29 June	U-2503	Type XXI submarine	Blohm + Voss	Hamburg	Germany	For Kriegsmarine
29 June	William Hodson	Liberty ship	Bethlehem-Fairfield Shipyards	Baltimore, Maryland	United States	
30 June	Alexander S. Clay	Liberty ship	J. A. Jones Construction Company	Brunswick, Georgia	United States	For War Shipping Administration.
30 June	J. H. Drummond	Liberty ship| For War Shipping Administration.	J. A. Jones Construction Company	Panama City, Florida	United States	
30 June	Jasper F. Cropsey	Liberty ship	St. Johns River Shipbuilding Company	Jacksonville, Florida	United States	For War Shipping Administration.
30 June	La Porte	Haskell-class attack transport	Oregon Shipbuilding Company	Portland, Oregon	United States	For United States Navy.
30 June	Pocket Canyon	T2 Tanker	Alabama Drydock and Shipbuilding Company	Mobile, Alabama	United States	For War Shipping Administration.
30 June	Tomas Guardia	Liberty ship	Todd Houston Shipbuilding Corporation	Houston, Texas	United States	For War Shipping Administration.
30 June	Tule Canyon	T2 Tanker	Alabama Drydock and Shipbuilding Company	Mobile, Alabama	United States	For War Shipping Administration.
June	Barnton	Steam lighter	W. J. Yarwood & Sons Ltd.	Northwich	United Kingdom	For Imperial Chemical Industries Ltd.
June	CHANT 12	CHANT	Henry Scarr Ltd.	Hessle	United Kingdom	For Ministry of War Transport.
June	Empire Fabric	Empire F type coaster	Henry Scarr Ltd.	Hessle	United Kingdom	For Ministry of War Transport.
June	Empire Fulham	Water carrier	W. J. Yarwood & Sons Ltd.	Northwich	United Kingdom	For the Admiralty.
June	Empire Faversham	Empire F type coaster	Henry Scarr Ltd.	Hessle	United Kingdom	For Ministry of War Transport
June	Marechal Petain	Passenger ship	Construction Navales La Ciotat	Southern France	France	
June	Weserberg	Hansa A Type cargo ship	NV Machinefabriek en Scheepswerf P Smit Jr	Rotterdam	Netherlands	For Norddeutscher Lloyd

== July ==
Date	Ship	Class / type	Builder	Location	Country	Notes	
1 July	Arcadia Victory	Victory ship	California Shipbuilding Corporation	Los Angeles, California	United States	For War Shipping Administration.	
1 July	Benjamin Warner	Liberty ship	Permanente Metals, #2 Yard	Richmond, California	United States	For War Shipping Administration.	
1 July	Floyd W. Spencer	Liberty ship	Delta Shipbuilding Company	New Orleans, Louisiana	United States	For War Shipping Administration.	
1 July	Joseph B. Eastman	Liberty ship	Bethlehem-Fairfield Shipyards	Baltimore, Maryland	United States	For War Shipping Administration.	
1 July	Weserstrand	Hansa A Type cargo ship	NV Nederland Scheepvaart Maatschappij	Amsterdam	Netherlands	For Norddeutscher Lloyd	
2 July	Bremerton	Baltimore-class cruiser	New York Shipbuilding Corporation	Camden, New Jersey	United States	For United States Navy	
4 July	F. Southall Farrar	Liberty ship	J. A. Jones Construction Company	Brunswick, Georgia	United States	For War Shipping Administration.	
4 July	Latimer	Haskell-class attack transport	Oregon Shipbuilding Company	Portland, Oregon	United States	For United States Navy.	
4 July	Olmsted	Haskell-class attack transport	Kaiser Company	Vancouver, Washington	United States	For United States Navy	
5 July	Loch Boisdale	Loch-class frigate	Blyth Dry Docks & Shipbuilding Co. Ltd	Blyth, Northumberland	United Kingdom	For Royal Navy.	
5 July	TID 99	TID-class tug	Richard Dunston Ltd.	Thorne	United Kingdom	For the Admiralty.	
6 July	Empire Newfoundland	Empire Malta-class Scandinavian type cargo ship	William Gray & Co. Ltd.	West Hartlepool	United Kingdom	For Ministry of War Transport.	
6 July	Frumenton	Cargo ship	Burntisland Shipbuilding Company	Burntisland	United Kingdom	For R. Chapman & Son.	
6 July	Loch Killisport	Loch-class frigate	Harland & Wolff	Belfast	United Kingdom	For Royal Navy.	
6 July	Mallard	Coaster	Henry Scarr Ltd	Hessle	United Kingdom	For General Steam Navigation Co. Ltd.	
6 July	Danzig	U-3502	Germany	Schichau-Werke	United Kingdom	Type XXI submarine	For Kriegsmarine
6 July	Unnamed	Wave-class oiler	Harland & Wolff	Govan	United Kingdom	For the Admiralty. Laid down as Empire Venus but name cancelled before launch. Completed as RFA Wave Monarch Royal Fleet Auxiliary.	
7 July	Alcee Fortier	Liberty ship	Delta Shipbuilding Company	New Orleans, Louisiana	United States	For War Shipping Administration.	
7 July	B. Charney Vladeck	Liberty ship	New England Shipbuilding Company	South Portland, Maine	United States	For War Shipping Administration.	
7 July	Empire Crest	Intermediate type tanker	Sir J. Laing & Sons Ltd.	Sunderland	United Kingdom	For Ministry of War Transport.	
7 July	Empire Paul	Near-Warrior type tug	J. S. Watson Ltd.	Gainsborough	United Kingdom	For Ministry of War Transport.	
7 July	Honduras Victory	Victory ship	Permanente Metals, #1 Yard	Richmond, California	United States	For War Shipping Administration.	
8 July	Empire Crest	Tanker	Sir J Laing & Sons Ltd	Sunderland, Co Durham	United Kingdom	For Ministry of War Transport	
8 July	Clovis Victory	Victory ship	California Shipbuilding Corporation	Los Angeles, California	United States	For War Shipping Administration.	
8 July	Diligence	Liberty ship	Bethlehem-Fairfield Shipyards	Baltimore, Maryland	United States	For War Shipping Administration.	
8 July	Laura Drake Gill	Liberty ship	Todd Houston Shipbuilding Corporation	Houston, Texas	United States	For War Shipping Administration.	
8 July	Milton B. Medary	Liberty ship	Delta Shipbuilding Company	New Orleans, Louisiana	United States	For War Shipping Administration.	
9 July	Empire Fabian	Empire F type coaster	Henry Scarr Ltd	Hessle	United Kingdom	For Ministry of War Transport.	
9 July	TID 100	TID-class tug	Richard Dunston Ltd.	Thorne	United Kingdom	For the War Department.	
9 July	U-3002	Type XXI submarine	AG Weser	Bremen	Germany	For Kriegsmarine	
10 July	Empire Favourite	Empire F type coaster	Goole Shipbuilding & Repairing Co. Ltd	Goole	United Kingdom	For Ministry of War Transport.	
10 July	Empire Pitcairn	Cargo ship	John Readhead & Sons Ltd.	South Shields	United Kingdom	For Ministry of War Transport. Requisition by the Admiralty. Completed as the aircraft components repair and maintenance ship Moray Firth.	
10 July	Empire Shepherd	Icemaid type collier	Grangemouth Dockyard Co. Ltd.	Grangemouth	United Kingdom	For Ministry of War Transport.	
10 July	Walter Kidde	Liberty ship	Bethlehem-Fairfield Shipyards	Baltimore, Maryland	United States	For War Shipping Administration.	
10 July	Sherburne	Haskell-class attack transport	Permanente Metals, #2 Yard	Richmond, California	United States	For United States Navy.	
11 July	George R. Holmes	Liberty ship	Bethlehem-Fairfield Shipyards	Baltimore, Maryland	United States	For War Shipping Administration.	
11 July	Stephen Leacock	Liberty ship	Southeastern Shipbuilding Corporation	Savannah, Georgia	United States	For War Shipping Administration.	
11 July	Laurens	Haskell-class attack transport	Oregon Shipbuilding Company	Portland, Oregon	United States	For United States Navy.	
12 July	Andrew J. Newbury	Liberty ship	New England Shipbuilding Company	South Portland, Maine	United States	For War Shipping Administration.	
12 July	Angus McDonald	Liberty ship	Todd Houston Shipbuilding Corporation	Houston, Texas	United States	For War Shipping Administration.	
12 July	Frederick Von Steuben	Liberty ship	Delta Shipbuilding Company	New Orleans, Louisiana	United States	For War Shipping Administration.	
12 July	George L. Farley	Liberty ship	New England Shipbuilding Company	South Portland, Maine	United States	For War Shipping Administration.	
12 July	James W. Cannon	Liberty ship	J. A. Jones Construction Company	Brunswick, Georgia	United States	For War Shipping Administration.	
12 July	TID 101	TID-class tug	Richard Dunston Ltd.	Thorne	United Kingdom	For the Admiralty.	
12 July	William Crane Gray	Liberty ship	St. Johns River Shipbuilding Company	Jacksonville, Florida	United States	For War Shipping Administration.	
12 July	Oxford	Haskell-class attack transport	Kaiser Company	Vancouver, Washington	United States	For United States Navy	
13 July	Alamo Victory	Victory ship	California Shipbuilding Corporation	Los Angeles, California	United States	For War Shipping Administration.	
13 July	Guatemala Victory	Victory ship	Permanente Metals, #1 Yard	Richmond, California	United States	For War Shipping Administration.	
13 July	James Sullivan	Liberty ship	New England Shipbuilding Company	South Portland, Maine	United States	For War Shipping Administration.	
13 July	William L. Watson	Liberty ship	J. A. Jones Construction Company	Panama City, Florida	United States	For War Shipping Administration.	
13 July	U-2325	Type XXIII submarine	Deutsche Werft AG	Hamburg	Germany	For Kriegsmarine	
15 July	Charles A. Keffer	Liberty ship	Southeastern Shipbuilding Corporation	Savannah, Georgia	United States	For War Shipping Administration.	
17 July	Wynn Seale	Liberty ship	Todd Houston Shipbuilding Corporation	Houston, Texas	United States	For War Shipping Administration.	
17 July	Haskell	Haskell-class attack transport	California Shipbuilding Corporation	Los Angeles, California	United States	For United States Navy	
17 July	TID 102	TID-class tug	Richard Dunston Ltd.	Thorne	United Kingdom	For the Admiralty.	
17 July	U-2326	Type XXIII submarine	Deutsche Werft AG	Hamburg	Germany	For Kriegsmarine	
18 July	E. G. Hall	Liberty ship	Delta Shipbuilding Company	New Orleans, Louisiana	United States	For War Shipping Administration.	
18 July	Ethelbert Nevin	Liberty ship	St. Johns River Shipbuilding Company	Jacksonville, Florida	United States	For War Shipping Administration.	
18 July	Frederic A. Kummer	Liberty ship	Bethlehem-Fairfield Shipyards	Baltimore, Maryland	United States	For War Shipping Administration.	
18 July	Lowndes	Haskell-class attack transport	Oregon Shipbuilding Company	Portland, Oregon	United States	For United States Navy.	
18 July	U-2504	Type XXI submarine	Blohm + Voss	Hamburg	Germany	For Kriegsmarine	
18 July	U-3003	Type XXI submarine	AG Weser	Bremen	Germany	For Kriegsmarine	
18 July	VIC 45	VIC lighter	Richard Dunston Ltd.	Thorne	United Kingdom	For the Admiralty.	
18 July	Wahoo Swamp	T2 Tanker	Alabama Drydock and Shipbuilding Company	Mobile, Alabama	United States	For War Shipping Administration.	
19 July	Edward A. Savoy	Liberty ship	Bethlehem-Fairfield Shipyards	Baltimore, Maryland	United States	For War Shipping Administration.	
19 July	Empire Susan	Improved Larch-class tug	Clelands (Successors) Ltd	Willington Quay-on-Tyne	United Kingdom	For the Admiralty.	
19 July	John R. McQuigg	Liberty ship	J. A. Jones Construction Company	Panama City, Florida	United States	For War Shipping Administration.	
19 July	Sibley	Haskell-class attack transport	Permanente Metals, #2 Yard	Richmond, California	United States	For United States Navy.	
20 July	Australind	Cargo ship	William Denny and Brothers Ltd.	Dumbarton	United Kingdom	For Australind Steam Shipping Co. Ltd.	
20 July	Empire Protector	Wave-class oiler	Furness Shipbuilding Co. Ltd.	Haverton Hill-on-Tees	United Kingdom	For Ministry of War Transport.	
20 July	Gilbert Islands	Commencement Bay-class escort carrier	Todd Pacific Shipyards	Tacoma, Washington	United States	For United States Navy	
20 July	Haiti Victory	Victory ship	Permanente Metals, #1 Yard	Richmond, California	United States	For War Shipping Administration.	
20 July	Jewel	Algerine-class minesweeper	Harland & Wolff	Belfast	United Kingdom	For Royal Navy.	
20 July	Kula Gulf	Commencement Bay-class escort carrier	Todd Pacific Shipyards	Tacoma, Washington	United States	For United States Navy	
20 July	Oakham Castle	Castle-class corvette	Harland & Wolff	Govan	United Kingdom	For Royal Navy.	
20 July	TID 104	TID-class tug	Richard Dunston Ltd.	Thorne	United Kingdom	For the Admiralty.	
21 July	Frank Park	Liberty ship	J. A. Jones Construction Company	Brunswick, Georgia	United States	For War Shipping Administration.	
21 July	T. E. Mitchell	Liberty ship	Todd Houston Shipbuilding Corporation	Houston, Texas	United States	For War Shipping Administration.	
21 July	Pickens	Haskell-class attack transport	Kaiser Company	Vancouver, Washington	United States	For United States Navy	
22 July	Edward E. Spafford	Liberty ship	New England Shipbuilding Company	South Portland, Maine	United States	For War Shipping Administration.	
22 July	Empire Fashion	Empire F type coaster	Goole Shipbuilding & Repairing Co. Ltd	Goole	United Kingdom	For Ministry of War Transport.	
22 July	Risden Tyler Bennett	Liberty ship	Southeastern Shipbuilding Corporation	Savannah, Georgia	United States	For War Shipping Administration.	
22 July	Vincent Harrington	Liberty ship	Bethlehem-Fairfield Shipyards	Baltimore, Maryland	United States	For War Shipping Administration.	
22 July	Waco Victory	Victory ship	California Shipbuilding Corporation	Los Angeles, California	United States	For War Shipping Administration.	
22 July	I-201	I-201-class submarine	Kure Naval Arsenal	Kure, Hiroshima	Japan	For Imperial Japanese Navy	
23 July	Empire Fable	Empire F type coaster	Henry Scarr Ltd	Hessle	United Kingdom	For Ministry of War Transport.	
25 July	Carlos J. Finlay	Liberty ship	Todd Houston Shipbuilding Corporation	Houston, Texas	United States	For War Shipping Administration.	
25 July	W. S. Jennings	Liberty ship	St. Johns River Shipbuilding Company	Jacksonville, Florida	United States	For War Shipping Administration.	
25 July	Hocking	Haskell-class attack transport	California Shipbuilding Corporation	Los Angeles, California	United States	For United States Navy.	
25 July	Lycoming	Haskell-class attack transport	Oregon Shipbuilding Company	Portland, Oregon	United States	For United States Navy.	
26 July	Kettleman Hills	T2 tanker	Marinship Corporation	Sausalito, California	United States	For United States Maritime Commission.	
26 July	U-3004	Type XXI submarine	AG Weser	Bremen	Germany	For Kriegsmarine	
26 July	Carl E. Ladd	Liberty ship	J. A. Jones Construction Company	Panama City, Florida	United States	For War Shipping Administration.	
27 July	A. J. Cassatt	Liberty ship	Bethlehem-Fairfield Shipyards	Baltimore, Maryland	United States	For War Shipping Administration.	
27 July	La Grange	Haskell-class attack transport	California Shipbuilding Corporation	Los Angeles, California	United States	For United States Navy.	
27 July	Pondera	Haskell-class attack transport	Kaiser Company	Vancouver, Washington	United States	For United States Navy	
27 July	U-3503	Type XXI submarine	Schichau-Werke	Danzig	Germany	For Kriegsmarine	
27 July	U-2505	Type XXI submarine	Blohm + Voss	Hamburg	Germany	For Kriegsmarine	
27 July	U-2327	Type XXIII submarine	Deutsche Werft AG	Hamburg	Germany	For Kriegsmarine	
28 July	Kyle V. Johnson	Liberty ship	Todd Houston Shipbuilding Corporation	Houston, Texas	United States	For War Shipping Administration.	
28 July	S. Wiley Wakeman	Liberty ship	Bethlehem-Fairfield Shipyards	Baltimore, Maryland	United States	For War Shipping Administration.	
28 July	White Bird Canyon	T2 Tanker	Alabama Drydock and Shipbuilding Company	Mobile, Alabama	United States	For War Shipping Administration.	
29 July	VIC 46	VIC lighter	Richard Dunston Ltd.	Thorne	United Kingdom	For the Admiralty.	
29 July	Harold I. Pratt	Liberty ship	New England Shipbuilding Company	South Portland, Maine	United States	For War Shipping Administration.	
29 July	Joseph N. Dinand	Liberty ship	New England Shipbuilding Company	South Portland, Maine	United States	For War Shipping Administration.	
29 July	Lot M. Morrill	Liberty ship	New England Shipbuilding Company	South Portland, Maine	United States	For War Shipping Administration.	
31 July	El Caney	T2 Tanker	Alabama Drydock and Shipbuilding Company	Mobile, Alabama	United States	For War Shipping Administration.	
31 July	Filipp Mazzei	Liberty ship	St. Johns River Shipbuilding Company	Jacksonville, Florida	United States	For War Shipping Administration.	
31 July	Hecla	Liberty ship	Bethlehem-Fairfield Shipyards	Baltimore, Maryland	United States	For War Shipping Administration.	
31 July	Marcus H. Tracy	Liberty ship	New England Shipbuilding Company	South Portland, Maine	United States	For War Shipping Administration.	
31 July	Milton H. Smith	Liberty ship	Delta Shipbuilding Company	New Orleans, Louisiana	United States	For War Shipping Administration.	
31 July	Pedro Menendez	Liberty ship	J. A. Jones Construction Company	Panama City, Florida	United States	For War Shipping Administration.	
July	Hendrik Fisser VII	Hansa A Type cargo ship	T U K Smit	Kinderdijk	Netherlands	For Fisser & Van Doornum	
July	Mission San Lorenzo	T2 tanker	Marinship Corporation	Sausalito, California	United States	For United States Maritime Commission.	
July	Mission Santa Maria	T2 tanker	Marinship Corporation	Sausalito, California	United States	For United States Maritime Commission.	
July	SS Mission San Xavier (2)	T2 tanker	Marinship Corporation	Sausalito, California	United States	For United States Maritime Commission.	

== August ==
Date	Ship	Class / type	Builder	Location	Country	Notes
1 August	St. Mary's	Haskell-class attack transport	California Shipbuilding Corporation	Los Angeles, California	United States	For United States Navy.
1 August	Eugene T. Chamberlain	Liberty ship	J.A. Jones Construction	Charlotte, North Carolina	United States	For United States Maritime Commission.
1 August	TID 105	TID-class tug	Richard Dunston Ltd.	Thorne	United Kingdom	For the Admiralty.
2 August	Jacob A. Westervelt	Liberty ship	Todd Houston Shipbuilding	Houston, Texas	United States	For United States Maritime Commission.
2 August	Loch Ard	Loch-class frigate	Harland & Wolff	Belfast	United Kingdom	For Royal Navy.
2 August	O. L. Bodenhammer	Liberty ship	Delta Shipbuilding Company	New Orleans, Louisiana	United States	For United States Maritime Commission.
3 August	George Pomutz	Liberty ship	Delta Shipbuilding Company	New Orleans, Louisiana	United States	For United States Maritime Commission.
3 August	Alexander R. Shephard	Liberty ship	Southeastern Shipbuilding Corporation	Savannah, Georgia	United States	For United States Maritime Commission
3 August	Magdapur	Cargo ship	William Hamilton & Co. Ltd.	Port Glasgow	United Kingdom	For T. & J. Brocklebank Ltd.
3 August	Niso	Tanker	Harland & Wolff Ltd.	Belfast	United Kingdom	For Anglo-Saxon Petroleum Co. Ltd.
4 August	Empire Fane	Empire F type coaster	Goole Shipbuilding & Repairing Co. Ltd	Goole	United Kingdom	For Ministry of War Transport.
4 August	Mellette	Haskell-class attack transport	Oregon Shipbuilding Corporation	Portland, Oregon	United States	For United States Navy.
August 4	Navicella	Tanker	R. & W. Hawthorn, Leslie and Co. Ltd.	Newcastle on Tyne	United Kingdom	For Anglo-Saxon Petroleum Co. Ltd.
5 August	Masbate	Liberty ship	Bethlehem Fairfield Shipyard	Baltimore, Maryland	United States	For United States Maritime Commission.
5 August	Robert S. Lovett	Liberty ship	Todd Houston Shipbuilding	Houston, Texas	United States	For United States Maritime Commission.
5 August	U-2506	Type XXI submarine	Blohm & Voss	Hamburg	Germany	For Kriegsmarine
6 August	Abatan	Suamico-class oiler	Marinship	Sausolito, California	United States	For United States Navy
6 August	Hendry	Haskell-class attack transport	California Shipbuilding Corporation	Los Angeles, California	United States	For United States Navy.
7 August	Mifflin	Haskell-class attack transport	Richmond Shipyards	Richmond, California	United States	For United States Navy.
7 August	Frederick W. Wood	Liberty ship	Bethlehem Fairfield Shipyard	Baltimore, Maryland	United States	For United States Maritime Commission.
7 August	Javanese Prince	Cargo ship	Blythswood Shipbuilding Co. Ltd.	Glasgow	United Kingdom	For Rio Cape Line Ltd.
7 August	Thomas B. King	Liberty ship	J.A. Jones Construction	Brunswick, Georgia	United States	For United States Maritime Commission.
8 August	George N. Seger	Liberty ship	New England Shipbuilding Corporation	South Portland, Maine	United States	For United States Maritime Commission.
8 August	Henry Hadley	Liberty ship	St. Johns River Shipbuilding Company	Jacksonville, Florida	United States	For War Shipping Administration.
9 August	George Ade	Liberty ship	J.A. Jones Construction	Panama City, Florida	United States	For War Shipping Administration.
9 August	Registan	Cargo ship	William Doxford & Sons Ltd.	Pallion	United Kingdom	For Strick Line (1923) Ltd.
10 August	Ida Straus	Liberty ship	Todd Houston Shipbuilding	Houston, Texas	United States	For United States Maritime Commission.
10 August	Nicaragua Victory	Victory Ship	Richmond Shipyards	Richmond, California	United States	For War Shipping Administration.
10 August	Rutland	Haskell-class attack transport	Kaiser Shipyards	Vancouver, Washington	United States	For United States Navy
10 August	S. M. Shoemaker	Liberty ship	Bethlehem Fairfield Shipyard	Baltimore, Maryland	United States	For United States Maritime Commission.
11 August	U-2329	Type XXIII submarine	Deutsche Werft	Hamburg	Germany	For Kriegsmarine
12 August	Empire Tapley	Empire Lad-class coastal tanker	Isaac Pimblott & Sons Ltd.	Northwich	United Kingdom	For Ministry of War Transport.
12 August	Isaac Delgado	Liberty ship	Delta Shipbuilding Company	New Orleans, Louisiana	United States	For United States Maritime Commission.
12 August	James Swan	Liberty ship	Southeastern Shipbuilding Corporation	Savannah, Georgia	United States	For United States Maritime Commission.
12 August	Mission Santa Ana	T2 tanker	Marinship Corporation	Sausalito, California	United States	For United States Maritime Commission.
12 August	Napa	Haskell-class attack transport	Oregon Shipbuilding Corporation	Portland, Oregon	United States	For United States Navy.
12 August	Palawan	Liberty ship	Bethlehem Fairfield Shipyard	Baltimore, Maryland	United States	For United States Maritime Commission.
12 August	TID 107	TID-class tug	Richard Dunston Ltd.	Thorne	United Kingdom	For the War Department.
13 August	Fall River	Baltimore-class cruiser	New York Shipbuilding Corporation	Camden, New Jersey	United States	For United States Navy
14 August	R. Walton Moore	Liberty ship	J.A. Jones Construction	Brunswick, Georgia	United States	For United States Maritime Commission.
14 August	The Cabins	T2 Tanker	Alabama Drydock and Shipbuilding Company	Mobile, Alabama	United States	For War Shipping Administration.
14 August	TID 106	TID-class tug	Richard Dunston Ltd.	Thorne	United Kingdom	For the Admiralty.
14 August	U-2507	Type XXI submarine	Blohm & Voss	Hamburg	Germany	For Kriegsmarine
15 August	Alfred I. Dupont	Liberty ship	St. Johns River Shipbuilding Company	Jacksonville, Florida	United States	For War Shipping Administration.
15 August	U-3504	Type XXI submarine	Schichau-Werke	Danzig	Germany	For Kriegsmarine
16 August	Michael Moran	Liberty ship	New England Shipbuilding Corporation	South Portland, Maine	United States	For United States Maritime Commission.
16 August	Thomas Bradlee	Liberty ship	New England Shipbuilding Corporation	South Portland, Maine	United States	For United States Maritime Commission.
16 August	Thomas Bulfinch	Liberty ship	Todd Houston Shipbuilding	Houston, Texas	United States	For United States Maritime Commission.
16 August	William Tyler	Liberty ship	New England Shipbuilding Corporation	South Portland, Maine	United States	For United States Maritime Commission.
17 August	Edward K. Collins	Liberty ship	J.A. Jones Construction	Panama City, Florida	United States	For War Shipping Administration.
17 August	Robert F. Broussard	Liberty ship	Delta Shipbuilding Company	New Orleans, Louisiana	United States	For United States Maritime Commission.
August	Talladega	Haskell-class attack transport	Richmond Shipyards	Richmond, California	United States	For United States Navy.
17 August	U-2328	Type XXIII submarine	Deutsche Werft	Hamburg	Germany	For Kriegsmarine
18 August	Empire Kitchener	Standard Fast type cargo liner	Caledon Shipbuilding & Engineering Co. Ltd.	Dundee	United Kingdom	For Ministry of War Transport.
18 August	Empire Wilson	Standard Fast type cargo liner	C. Connell & Co. Ltd.	Scotstoun	United Kingdom	For Ministry of War Transport.
18 August	Niels Poulson	Liberty ship	J.A. Jones Construction	Brunswick, Georgia	United States	For United States Maritime Commission.
18 August	U-2330	Type XXIII submarine	Deutsche Werft	Hamburg	Germany	For Kriegsmarine
19 August	Empire Cowdray	Cargo ship	Shipbuilding Corporation Ltd	Sunderland	United Kingdom	For Ministry of War Transport
19 August	Empire Labrador	Empire Malta-class Scandinavian type cargo ship	William Gray & Co. Ltd.	West Hartlepool	United Kingdom	For Ministry of War Transport.
19 August	Licentia	Hansa A Type cargo ship	Flensburger Schiffbau-Gesellschaft	Flensburg	Germany	For J Jost
19 August	Lorado Taft	Liberty ship	Todd Houston Shipbuilding	Houston, Texas	United States	For United States Maritime Commission.
19 August	Martha Berry	Liberty ship	Southeastern Shipbuilding Corporation	Savannah, Georgia	United States	For United States Maritime Commission.
19 August	Sanborn	Haskell-class attack transport	Kaiser Shipyards	Vancouver, Washington	United States	For United States Navy
19 August	Topeka	Cleveland-class cruiser	Fore River Shipyard	Quincy, Massachusetts	United States	For United States Navy
19 August	U-2508	Type XXI submarine	Blohm & Voss	Hamburg	Germany	For Kriegsmarine
19 August	U-3005	Type XXI submarine	AG Weser	Bremen	Germany	For Kriegsmarine
19 August	VIC 81	VIC lighter	J. Harker Ltd.	Knottingley	United Kingdom	For the Admiralty.
20 August	Antietam	Essex-class aircraft carrier	Philadelphia Naval Shipyard	Philadelphia, Pennsylvania	United States	For United States Navy
20 August	Chicago	Baltimore-class cruiser	Philadelphia Naval Shipyard	Philadelphia, Pennsylvania	United States	For United States Navy
20 August	Los Angeles	Baltimore-class cruiser	Philadelphia Naval Shipyard	Philadelphia, Pennsylvania	United States	For United States Navy
21 August	Ancil F. Haines	Liberty ship	Delta Shipbuilding Company	Los Angeles, California	United States	For United States Maritime Commission.
21 August	Frederick H. Baetjer	Liberty Ship	Bethlehem Fairfield Shipyard	Baltimore, Maryland	United States	For United States Maritime Commission
21 August	Highlands	Haskell-class attack transport	California Shipbuilding Corporation	Los Angeles, California	United States	For United States Navy.
21 August	Legion Victory	Victory ship	Richmond Shipyards	Richmond, California	United States	For War Shipping Administration.
21 August	U-2331	Type XXIII submarine	Deutsche Werft	Hamburg	Germany	For Kriegsmarine
22 August	Alexander V. Fraser	Liberty ship	Bethlehem Fairfield Shipyard	Baltimore, Maryland	United States	For United States Maritime Commission.
22 August	Arthur J. Tyrer	Liberty ship	J.A. Jones Construction	Brunswick, Georgia	United States	For United States Maritime Commission.
22 August	Elk Hills	T2 tanker	Marinship Corporation	Sausalito, California	United States	For United States Maritime Commission.
22 August	Irvin S. Cobb	Liberty ship	St. Johns River Shipbuilding Company	Jacksonville, Florida	United States	For War Shipping Administration.
22 August	Liberty	Algerine-class minesweeper	Harland & Wolff	Belfast	United Kingdom	For Royal Navy.
22 August	Nordahl Greig	T2 Tanker	Alabama Drydock and Shipbuilding Company	Mobile, Alabama	United States	For War Shipping Administration.
22 August	Tazewell	Haskell-class attack transport	Richmond Shipyards	Richmond, California	United States	For United States Navy.
23 August	Sieur de la Salle	Liberty ship	Delta Shipbuilding Company	New Orleans, Louisiana	United States	For United States Maritime Commission
24 August	Empire Sarawak	Cargo ship	John Readhead & Sons Ltd.	South Shields	United Kingdom	For Ministry of War Transport. Requisitioned by the Admiralty, completed as a hull repair and maintenance ship as Beauly Firth.
24 August	Newberry	Haskell-class attack transport	Oregon Shipbuilding Corporation	Portland, Oregon	United States	For United States Navy.
24 August	William Lyon Phelps	Liberty ship	New England Shipbuilding Corporation	South Portland, Maine	United States	For United States Maritime Commission.
25 August	Howard L. Gibson	Liberty ship	Todd Houston Shipyards	Houston, Texas	United States	For United States Maritime Commission.
25 August	U-3006	Type XXI submarine	AG Weser	Bremen	Germany	For Kriegsmarine
26 August	C. Francis Jenkins	Liberty ship	J.A. Jones Construction	Jacksonville, Florida	United States	For War Shipping Administration.
26 August	Jesse Cottrell	Liberty ship	Bethlehem Fairfield Shipyard	Baltimore, Maryland	United States	For United States Maritime Commission.
26 August	TID 108	TID-class tug	Richard Dunston Ltd.	Thorne	United Kingdom	For Ministry of War Transport.
26 August	U-2334	Type XXIII submarine	Deutsche Werft	Hamburg	Germany	For Kriegsmarine
26 August	VIC 51	VIC lighter	Isaac Pimblott & Sons Ltd.	Northwich	United Kingdom	For the Admiralty.
27 August	Little Rock	Cleveland-class cruiser	William Cramp & Sons	Philadelphia, Pennsylvania	United States	For United States Navy
27 August	U-2509	Type XXI submarine	Blohm & Voss	Hamburg	Germany	For Kriegsmarine
28 August	Alfred J. Evans	Liberty ship	Delta Shipbuilding Company	New Orleans, Louisiana	United States	For United States Maritime Commission.
28 August	Empire Jura	Coastal tanker	A & J Inglis	Glasgow	United Kingdom	For Ministry of War Transport
28 August	Frank P. Walsh	Liberty ship	Southeastern Shipbuilding Corporation	Savannah, Georgia	United States	For United States Maritime Commission
28 August	Hinsdale	Haskell-class attack transport	California Shipbuilding Corporation	Los Angeles, California	United States	For United States Navy.
28 August	Lost Hills	T2 tanker	Marinship Corporation	Sausalito, California	United States	For United States Maritime Commission.
28 August	U-3505	Type XXI submarine	Schichau-Werke	Danzig	Germany	For Kriegsmarine
29 August	Darke	Haskell-class attack transport	Oregon Shipbuilding Corporation	Portland, Oregon	United States	For United States Navy.
29 August	Kittson	Haskell-class attack transport	California Shipbuilding Corporation	Los Angeles, California	United States	For United States Navy.
29 August	Negley D. Cochran	Liberty ship	St. Johns River Shipbuilding Company	Jacksonville, Florida	United States	For War Shipping Administration.
29 August	The Cottonwoods	T2 Tanker	Alabama Drydock and Shipbuilding Company	Mobile, Alabama	United States	For War Shipping Administration.
29 August	Thomas Eakins	Liberty ship	Todd Houston Shipyards	Houston, Texas	United States	For United States Maritime Commission.
29 August	U-2510	Type XXI submarine	Blohm & Voss	Hamburg	Germany	For Kriegsmarine
29 August	U-2511	Type XXI submarine	Blohm & Voss	Hamburg	Germany	For Kriegsmarine
30 August	Telfair	Haskell-class attack transport	Richmond Shipyards	Richmond, California	United States	For United States Navy.
30 August	William Libbey	Liberty ship	Bethlehem Fairfield Shipyard	Baltimore, Maryland	United States	For United States Maritime Commission.
31 August	Archibald R. Mansfield	Liberty ship	New England Shipbuilding	Portland, Maine	United States	For United States Maritime Commission.
31 August	Barren Hill	T2 Tanker	Alabama Drydock and Shipbuilding Company	Mobile, Alabama	United States	For War Shipping Administration.
31 August	Boulder Victory	Victory ship	Richmond Shipyards	Richmond, California	United States	For United States Maritime Commission
31 August	Cassius Hudson	Liberty ship	J.A. Jones Construction	Brunswick, Georgia	United States	For United States Maritime Commission.
31 August	C. H. M. Jones	Liberty ship	New England Shipbuilding	Portland, Maine	United States	For United States Maritime Commission.
31 August	Floyd Gibbons	Liberty ship	Southeastern Shipbuilding Corporation	Savannah, Georgia	United States	For United States Maritime Commission.
31 August	Fort Grand Rapids	Fort ship	West Coast Shipbuilders Ltd	Vancouver	Canada	For Canadian Government.
31 August	Galen L. Stone	Liberty ship	New England Shipbuilding	Portland, Maine	United States	For United States Maritime Commission.
31 August	Raymond V. Ingersoll	Liberty ship	J.A. Jones Construction	Panama City, Florida	United States	For War Shipping Administration.
31 August	Roybank	Cargo ship	William Doxford & Sons Ltd.	Pallion	United Kingdom	For Bank Line Ltd.
31 August	TID 109	TID-class tug	Richard Dunston Ltd.	Thorne	United Kingdom	For the Admiralty.
31 August	U-2335	Type XXI submarine	Deutsche Werft	Hamburg	Germany	For Kriegsmarine
August	Empire Fanfare	Empire F type coaster	Henry Scarr Ltd	Hessle	United Kingdom	For Ministry of War Transport.
August	Empire Farringdon	Empire F type coaster	Henry Scarr Ltd	Hessle	United Kingdom	For Ministry of War Transport.
August	Empire Farringdon	Empire F type coaster	Henry Scarr Ltd	Hessle	United Kingdom	For Ministry of War Transport.

== September ==
Date	Ship	Class / type	Builder	Location	Country	Notes
1 September	Alacrity	Modified Black Swan-class sloop			United Kingdom	For Royal Navy
1 September	Corfen	Collier	Hall, Russell & Co. Ltd.	Aberdeen	United Kingdom	For Cory Colliers Ltd.
1 September	Kenton	Haskell-class attack transport	California Shipbuilding Corporation	Los Angeles, California	United States	For United States Navy.
2 September	Empire Falkland	Refrigerated cargo liner	Harland & Wolff	Belfast	United Kingdom	For Ministry of War Transport
2 September	Empire Farnham	Empire F type coaster	Goole Shipbuilding & Repairing Co. Ltd	Goole	United Kingdom	For Ministry of War Transport.
2 September	Robert E. Clarkson	Liberty ship	Todd Houston Shipbuilding Corporation	Houston, Texas	United States	For War Shipping Administration.
2 September	I-202	I-201-class submarine	Kure Naval Arsenal	Kure, Hiroshima	Japan	For Imperial Japanese Navy
2 September	Loch Quoich	Loch-class frigate	Blyth Dry Docks & Shipbuilding Co. Ltd	Blyth, Northumberland	United Kingdom	For Royal Navy.
2 September	Sandoval	Haskell-class attack transport	Kaiser Company	Vancouver, Washington	United States	For United States Navy
3 September	LST 3006	Landing Ship, Tank	Harland & Wolff	Belfast	United Kingdom	For Royal Navy.
3 September	Tucson	Atlanta-class cruiser	Bethlehem Steel Corporation	San Francisco	United States	For United States Navy
4 September	Anna Dickinson	Liberty ship	St. Johns River Shipbuilding Company	Jacksonville, Florida	United States	For War Shipping Administration.
4 September	Benjamin Peixotto	Liberty ship	Bethlehem-Fairfield Shipyards	Baltimore, Maryland	United States	For War Shipping Administration.
4 September	Dullisk Cove	Cargo ship	Short Brothers Ltd.	Sunderland	United Kingdom	For Admiralty, completed as a hull repair ship.
4 September	Empire Asquith	Cargo ship	Shipbuilding Corporation Ltd	Newcastle upon Tyne	United Kingdom	For Ministry of War Transport
4 September	Empire Chancellor	Norwegian type tanker	Sir J. Laing & Sons Ltd.	Sunderland	United Kingdom	For Ministry of War Transport.
4 September	Lanier	Haskell-class attack transport	California Shipbuilding Corporation	Los Angeles, California	United States	For United States Navy.
4 September	U-3007	Type XXI submarine	AG Weser	Bremen	Germany	For Kriegsmarine
5 September	Durango	Refrigerated cargo ship	Harland & Wolff	Belfast	United Kingdom	For Royal Mail Line.
5 September	Empire Labuan	Cargo ship	William Gray & Co. Ltd.	West Hartlepool	United Kingdom	Requisitioned by the Admiralty. Completed as HMS Holm Sound.
5 September	Irving Babbitt	Liberty ship	Todd Houston Shipbuilding Corporation	Houston, Texas	United States	For War Shipping Administration.
5 September	Empire Alfred	Near-Warrior type tug	J. S. Watson Ltd.	Gainsborough	United Kingdom	For Ministry of War Transport.
6 September	Benjamin F. Coston	Liberty ship	J. A. Jones Construction Company	Panama City, Florida	United States	For War Shipping Administration.
6 September	Missoula	Haskell-class attack transport	Permanente Metals, #2 Yard	Richmond, California	United States	For United States Navy.
6 September	TID 110	TID-class tug	Richard Dunston Ltd.	Thorne	United Kingdom	For Ministry of War Transport.
7 September	EmpirePortland'	Hopper ship	William Simons & Co. Ltd.	Greenock	United Kingdom	For Ministry of War Transport.
7 September	Jonas Lie	Liberty ship	Southeastern Shipbuilding Corporation	Savannah, Georgia	United States	For War Shipping Administration.
7 September	U-2512	Type XXI submarine	Blohm + Voss	Hamburg	Germany	For Kriegsmarine
8 September	Ferdinand Gagnon	Liberty ship	New England Shipbuilding Company	South Portland, Maine	United States	For War Shipping Administration.
8 September	Dickens	Haskell-class attack transport	Oregon Shipbuilding Company	Portland, Oregon	United States	For United States Navy.
8 September	Scarborough Castle	Castle-class corvette	Fleming & Ferguson Ltd.	Paisley	United Kingdom	For Royal Navy. Completed asEmpire Peacemaker for Ministry of War Transport.
9 September	Frederick Victory	Victory ship	Bethlehem-Fairfield Shipyards	Baltimore, Maryland	United States	For United States Navy.
9 September	U-3506	Type XXI submarine	Schichau-Werke	Danzig	Germany	For Kriegsmarine
9 September	Lunsford Richardson	Liberty ship	J. A. Jones Construction Company	Brunswick, Georgia	United States	For War Shipping Administration.
9 September	Michael J. Owens	Liberty ship	Todd Houston Shipbuilding Corporation	Houston, Texas	United States	For War Shipping Administration.
9 September	Provo Victory	Victory ship	Permanente Metals, #1 Yard	Richmond, California	United States	For War Shipping Administration.
9 September	Allendale	Haskell-class attack transport	California Shipbuilding Corporation	Los Angeles, California	United States	For United States Navy.
9 September	Deuel	Haskell-class attack transport	Oregon Shipbuilding Company	Portland, Oregon	United States	For United States Navy.
10 September	John Ringling	Liberty ship	St. Johns River Shipbuilding Company	Jacksonville, Florida	United States	For War Shipping Administration.
10 September	U-2336	Type XXIII submarine	Deutsche Werft AG	Hamburg	Germany	For Kriegsmarine
11 September	Christian Bergh	Liberty ship	Delta Shipbuilding Company	New Orleans, Louisiana	United States	For War Shipping Administration.
11 September	Lenawee	Haskell-class attack transport	Kaiser Company	Vancouver, Washington	United States	For United States Navy
11 September	TID 111	TID-class tug	Richard Dunston Ltd.	Thorne	United Kingdom	For the Admiralty.
12 September	Cape Gloucester	Commencement Bay-class escort carrier	Todd Pacific Shipyards	Tacoma, Washington	United States	For United States Navy
12 September	George M. Verity	Liberty ship	Bethlehem-Fairfield Shipyards	Baltimore, Maryland	United States	For War Shipping Administration.
13 September	Arsterturm	Hansa A Type cargo ship	Deutsche Werft	Finkenwerder	Germany	For Deutsche Dampfschiffahrts-Gesellschaft Hansa
13 September	Bedford Victory	Victory ship	Permanente Metals, #1 Yard	Richmond, California	United States	For War Shipping Administration.
13 September	Dutiful	Liberty ship	Bethlehem-Fairfield Shipyards	Baltimore, Maryland	United States	For War Shipping Administration.
13 September	John P. Harris	Liberty ship	Southeastern Shipbuilding Corporation	Savannah, Georgia	United States	For War Shipping Administration.
13 September	Thomas P. Leathers	Liberty ship	Delta Shipbuilding Company	New Orleans, Louisiana	United States	For War Shipping Administration.
13 September	Montrose	Haskell-class attack transport	Permanente Metals, #2 Yard	Richmond, California	United States	For United States Navy.
14 September	Am-Mer-Mar	Liberty ship	Delta Shipbuilding Company	New Orleans, Louisiana	United States	For War Shipping Administration.
14 September	Arenac	Haskell-class attack transport	California Shipbuilding Corporation	Los Angeles, California	United States	For United States Navy.
14 September	Drew	Haskell-class attack transport	Oregon Shipbuilding Company	Portland, Oregon	United States	For United States Navy.
14 September	Edward G. Janeway	Liberty ship	Todd Houston Shipbuilding Corporation	Houston, Texas	United States	For War Shipping Administration.
14 September	Nadir	Cargo ship	Lithgows Ltd.	Port Glasgow	United Kingdom	For Asiatic Steam Navigation Co. Ltd.
14 September	U-2513	Type XXI submarine	Blohm + Voss	Hamburg	Germany	For Kriegsmarine
14 September	U-3008	Type XXI submarine	AG Weser	Bremen	Germany	For Kriegsmarine
15 September	Empire Martaban	Cargo ship	Burntisland Shipbuilding Company	Burntisland	United Kingdom	For Ministry of War Transport.
15 September	TID 112	TID-class tug	Richard Dunston Ltd.	Thorne	United Kingdom	For the Admiralty.
15 September	TID 113	TID-class tug	Richard Dunston Ltd.	Thorne	United Kingdom	For Ministry of War Transport.
15 September	U-2337	Type XXIII submarine	Deutsche Werft AG	Hamburg	Germany	For Kriegsmarine
15 September	William P. Duval	Liberty ship	J. A. Jones Construction Company	Panama City, Florida	United States	For War Shipping Administration.
16 September	Charles C. Glover	Liberty ship	Bethlehem-Fairfield Shipyards	Baltimore, Maryland	United States	For War Shipping Administration.
16 September	Chupra	Cargo ship	Barclay, Curle & Co. Ltd.	Glasgow	United Kingdom	For British India Steam Navigation Company.
16 September	LST 3007	Landing Ship, Tank	Harland & Wolff	Belfast	United Kingdom	For Royal Navy.
16 September	U-3507	Type XXI submarine	Schichau-Werke	Danzig	Germany	For Kriegsmarine
16 September	Elijah Cobb	Liberty ship	New England Shipbuilding Company	South Portland, Maine	United States	For War Shipping Administration.
16 September	Las Vegas Victory	Victory ship	Permanente Metals, #1 Yard	Richmond, California	United States	For War Shipping Administration.
16 September	Madawaska Victory	Victory ship	Bethlehem-Fairfield Shipyards	Baltimore, Maryland	United States	For War Shipping Administration.
16 September	Michael Dekovats	Liberty ship	St. Johns River Shipbuilding Company	Jacksonville, Florida	United States	For War Shipping Administration.
16 September	Saint Paul	Baltimore-class cruiser	Bethlehem Steel Company	Quincy, Massachusetts	United States	
17 September	Angtelope Hills	T2 tanker	Marinship Corporation	Sausalito, California	United States	For United States Maritime Commission.
17 September	U-2514	Type XXI submarine	Blohm + Voss	Hamburg	Germany	For Kriegsmarine
18 September	Empire Ganges	Intermediate type tanker	J. L. Thompson & Sons Ltd.	Sunderland	United Kingdom	For Ministry of War Transport.
18 September	Frank P. Reed	Liberty ship	New England Shipbuilding Company	South Portland, Maine	United States	For War Shipping Administration.
18 September	Johan Printz	Liberty ship	J. A. Jones Construction Company	Brunswick, Georgia	United States	For War Shipping Administration.
18 September	Michael Anagnos	Liberty ship	New England Shipbuilding Company	South Portland, Maine	United States	For War Shipping Administration.
18 September	Robert B. Forbes	Liberty ship	New England Shipbuilding Company	South Portland, Maine	United States	For War Shipping Administration.
18 September	U-2338	Type XXIII submarine	Deutsche Werft AG	Hamburg	Germany	For Kriegsmarine
19 September	Bemis Heights	T2 Tanker	Alabama Drydock and Shipbuilding Company	Mobile, Alabama	United States	For War Shipping Administration.
19 September	City of Madras	Cargo ship	Swan, Hunter & Wigham Richardson Ltd.	Wallsend	United Kingdom	For Ellerman's Hall Line Ltd.
19 September	Eastland	Haskell-class attack transport	Oregon Shipbuilding Company	Portland, Oregon	United States	For United States Navy.
19 September	Empire Farouche	Empire F type coaster	Goole Shipbuilding & Repairing Co. Ltd	Goole	United Kingdom	For Ministry of War Transport.
19 September	Empire Polly	Near-Warrior type tug	A. Hall & Co. Ltd.	Aberdeen	United Kingdom	For Ministry of War Transport.
19 September	Lady Bourdillon'	Dredger	William Simons & Co. Ltd.	Greenock	United Kingdom	For Government of Nigeria.
19 September	Logan	Haskell-class attack transport	Kaiser Company	Vancouver, Washington	United States	
19 September	Empire Polly	Tug	A Hall & Co Ltd	Aberdeen	United Kingdom	For Ministry of War Transport
19 September	Empire Farouche	Empire F type coaster	Goole Shipbuilding & Repairing Ltd	Goole	United Kingdom	For Ministry of War Transport
20 September	Herbert D. Croly	Liberty ship	Todd Houston Shipbuilding Corporation	Houston, Texas	United States	For War Shipping Administration.
20 September	I-203	I-201-class submarine	Kure Naval Arsenal	Kure, Hiroshima	Japan	For Imperial Japanese Navy
20 September	Mountrail	Haskell-class attack transport	Permanente Metals, #2 Yard	Richmond, California	United States	For United States Navy.
20 September	Portsmouth	Cleveland-class cruiser	Newport News Shipbuilding & Drydock Company	Newport News, Virginia	United States	
21 September	Arlington	Haskell-class attack transport	California Shipbuilding Corporation	Los Angeles, California	United States	For United States Navy. Renamed USS Marvin H. McIntyre before commissioning.
21 September	Briar Creek	T2 Tanker	Alabama Drydock and Shipbuilding Company	Mobile, Alabama	United States	For War Shipping Administration.
21 September	Empire Jupiter	Ocean type tanker	Harland & Wolff	Govan	United Kingdom	For Ministry of War Transport.
21 September	John Hanson	Liberty ship	Bethlehem-Fairfield Shipyards	Baltimore, Maryland	United States	For War Shipping Administration.
22 September	U-3508	Type XXI submarine	Schichau-Werke	Danzig	Germany	For Kriegsmarine
22 September	Charles A. McCue	Liberty ship	Bethlehem-Fairfield Shipyards	Baltimore, Maryland	United States	For War Shipping Administration.
22 September	Richard Coulter	Liberty ship	Southeastern Shipbuilding Corporation	Savannah, Georgia	United States	For War Shipping Administration.
22 September	Robert R. McBurney	Liberty ship	New England Shipbuilding Company	South Portland, Maine	United States	For War Shipping Administration.
22 September	U-2339	Type XXIII submarine	Deutsche Werft AG	Hamburg	Germany	For Kriegsmarine
22 September	U-2515	Type XXI submarine	Blohm + Voss	Hamburg	Germany	For Kriegsmarine
23 September	Charles S. Haight	Liberty ship	J. A. Jones Construction Company	Brunswick, Georgia	United States	For War Shipping Administration.
23 September	Frederic E. Ives	Liberty ship	Todd Houston Shipbuilding Corporation	Houston, Texas	United States	For War Shipping Administration.
23 September	John H. Mcintosh	Liberty ship	St. Johns River Shipbuilding Company	Jacksonville, Florida	United States	For War Shipping Administration.
23 September	Manderson Victory	Victory ship	Permanente Metals, #1 Yard	Richmond, California	United States	For War Shipping Administration.
23 September	Woodstock Victory	Victory ship	Bethlehem-Fairfield Shipyards	Baltimore, Maryland	United States	For War Shipping Administration.
24 September	Edgecombe	Haskell-class attack transport	Oregon Shipbuilding Company	Portland, Oregon	United States	For United States Navy.
24 September	Mission Alamo	T2 tanker	Marinship Corporation	Sausalito, California	United States	For United States Maritime Commission.
25 September	Benjamin Silliman	Liberty ship	Delta Shipbuilding Company	New Orleans, Louisiana	United States	For War Shipping Administration.
25 September	Lubbock	Haskell-class attack transport	Kaiser Company	Vancouver, Washington	United States	
25 September	Stepas Darius	Liberty ship	J. A. Jones Construction Company	Panama City, Florida	United States	For War Shipping Administration.
25 September	TID 114	TID-class tug	Richard Dunston Ltd.	Thorne	United Kingdom	For the Admiralty.
26 September	Katharine B. Sherwood	Liberty ship	Delta Shipbuilding Company	New Orleans, Louisiana	United States	For War Shipping Administration.
27 September	Milan R. Stefanik	Liberty ship	Bethlehem-Fairfield Shipyards	Baltimore, Maryland	United States	For War Shipping Administration.
27 September	Attala	Haskell-class attack transport	California Shipbuilding Corporation	Los Angeles, California	United States	For United States Navy.
27 September	Natrona	Haskell-class attack transport.	Permanente Metals, #2 Yard	Richmond, California	United States	
27 September	U-3509	Type XXI submarine	Schichau-Werke	Danzig	Germany	For Kriegsmarine
27 September	U-2516	Type XXI submarine	Blohm + Voss	Hamburg	Germany	For Kriegsmarine
27 September	U-2517	Type XXI submarine	Blohm + Voss	Hamburg	Germany	For Kriegsmarine
28 September	Addie Bagley Daniels	Liberty ship	Southeastern Shipbuilding Corporation	Savannah, Georgia	United States	For War Shipping Administration.
28 September	Alexander E. Brown	Liberty ship	J. A. Jones Construction Company	Panama City, Florida	United States	For War Shipping Administration.
28 September	Camp Defiance	T2 Tanker	Alabama Drydock and Shipbuilding Company	Mobile, Alabama	United States	For War Shipping Administration.
28 September	Queensborough Park	Park ship	J. A. Jones Construction Company	Vancouver	United States	For Ministry of War Transport.
28 September	Edward L. Logan	Liberty ship	West Coast Shipbuilders Ltd	South Portland, Maine	Canada	For War Shipping Administration.
28 September	U-2340	Type XXIII submarine	Deutsche Werft AG	Hamburg	Germany	For Kriegsmarine
29 September	Edward L. Logan	Liberty ship	New England Shipbuilding Company	South Portland, Maine	United States	
29 September	Jerry S. Foley	Liberty ship	St. Johns River Shipbuilding Company	Jacksonville, Florida	United States	For War Shipping Administration.
29 September	Walter Wellman	Liberty ship	Todd Houston Shipbuilding Corporation	Houston, Texas	United States	For War Shipping Administration.
29 September	Effingham	Haskell-class attack transport	Oregon Shipbuilding Company	Portland, Oregon	United States	For United States Navy.
29 September	McCracken	Haskell-class attack transport	Kaiser Company	Vancouver, Washington	United States	For United States Navy
29 September	Salerno Bay	Commencement Bay-class escort carrier	Todd Pacific Shipyards	Tacoma, Washington	United States	For United States Navy
29 September	U-3009	Type XXI submarine	AG Weser	Bremen	Germany	For Kriegsmarine
29 September	York Castle	Castle-class corvette	Ferguson Brothers Ltd	Glasgow	United Kingdom	For Royal Navy, completed as Empire Comfort for Ministry of War Transport
30 September	Barnwell	Haskell-class attack transport	California Shipbuilding Corporation	Los Angeles, California	United States	For United States Navy.
30 September	Buena Vista Hills	T2 tanker	Marinship Corporation	Sausalito, California	United States	For United States Maritime Commission.
30 September	Chatterton Hill	T2 Tanker	Alabama Drydock and Shipbuilding Company	Mobile, Alabama	United States	For War Shipping Administration.
30 September	Empire Bermuda	Empire Malta-class Scandinavian type cargo ship	William Gray & Co. Ltd.	West Hartlepool	United Kingdom	For Ministry of War Transport.
30 September	LST 3010	LST (3)	Harland & Wolff	Belfast	United Kingdom	For Royal Navy.
30 September	Terrible	Majestic-class aircraft carrier	HMNB Devonport	England	United Kingdom	For Royal Navy
30 September	R. J. Reynolds	Liberty ship	J. A. Jones Construction Company	Brunswick, Georgia	United States	For War Shipping Administration.
September	Empire Farringdon	Empire F type coaster	Henry Scarr Ltd	Hessle	United Kingdom	For Ministry of War Transport

== October ==
Date	Ship	Class / type	Builder	Location	Country	Notes
2 October	Empire Farringay	Empire F type coaster	Goole Shipbuilding & Repairing Co. Ltd	Goole	United Kingdom	For Ministry of War Transport.
2 October	Empire Tavoy	Cargo ship	William Doxford & Sons Ltd.	Pallion	United Kingdom	For Ministry of War Transport.
2 October	J. Rufino Barrios	Liberty ship	Delta Shipbuilding Company	New Orleans, Louisiana	United States	For War Shipping Administration.
2 October	Richard J. Hopkins	Liberty ship	Todd Houston Shipbuilding Corporation	Houston, Texas	United States	For War Shipping Administration.
3 October	City of Durham	Cargo ship	Cammell Laird & Co. Ltd.	Birkenhead	United Kingdom	For Ellerman City Line Ltd.
3 October	Empire Albany	Coaster	Richards Ironworks Ltd.	Lowestoft	United Kingdom	For Ministry of War Transport.
3 October	James T. Fields	Liberty ship	New England Shipbuilding Company	South Portland, Maine	United States	For War Shipping Administration.
3 October	Loammi Baldwin	Liberty ship	New England Shipbuilding Company	South Portland, Maine	United States	For War Shipping Administration.
3 October	Navarro	Haskell-class attack transport	Permanente Metals, #2 Yard	Richmond, California	United States	For United States Navy.
3 October	Tamele	Cargo ship	Cammell Laird & Co. Ltd.	Birkenhead	United Kingdom	For Elder, Dempster Lines Ltd.
3 October	U-2341	Type XXIII submarine	Deutsche Werft AG	Hamburg	Germany	For Kriegsmarine
3 October	VIC 54	VIC lighter	J. S. Watson (Gainsborough) Ltd.	Gainsborough	United Kingdom	For Ministry of War Transport.
4 October	Chief Osceola	Liberty ship	J. A. Jones Construction Company	Panama City, Florida	United States	For War Shipping Administration.
4 October	TID 116	TID-class tug	Richard Dunston Ltd.	Thorne	United Kingdom	For the Admiralty.
4 October	U-3510	Type XXI submarine	Schichau-Werke	Danzig	Germany	For Kriegsmarine
4 October	Magoffin	Haskell-class attack transport	Kaiser Company	Vancouver, Washington	United States	For United States Navy
4 October	Empire Dorrit	Coaster	Scott & Sons Ltd	Bowling	United Kingdom	For Ministry of War Transport
4 October	Empire Elinor	Near-Warrior type tug	Henry Scarr Ltd.	Hessle	United Kingdom	For Ministry of War Transport.
4 October	Empire Jenny	Near-Warrior type tug	Cochrane & Sons Ltd.	Selby	United Kingdom	For Ministry of War Transport.
4 October	U-2518	Type XXI submarine	Blohm + Voss	Hamburg	Germany	For Kriegsmarine
5 October	Barnard Castle	Castle-class corvette	G. Brown & Co. (Marine) Ltd.	Greenock	United Kingdom	For Royal Navy. Completed as Empire Shelter for Ministry of War Transport.
5 October	Kermit Roosevelt	Liberty ship	Bethlehem-Fairfield Shipyards	Baltimore, Maryland	United States	For War Shipping Administration.
5 October	Robert Mills	Liberty ship	St. Johns River Shipbuilding Company	Jacksonville, Florida	United States	For War Shipping Administration.
5 October	St. Albans Victory	Victory ship	Bethlehem-Fairfield Shipyards	Baltimore, Maryland	United States	For War Shipping Administration.
5 October	William H. Edwards	Liberty ship	Southeastern Shipbuilding Corporation	Savannah, Georgia	United States	For War Shipping Administration.
5 October	Fond du Lac	Haskell-class attack transport	Oregon Shipbuilding Company	Portland, Oregon	United States	For United States Navy.
5 October	Empire Barbara	Near-Warrior type tug	Cochrane & Sons Ltd.	Selby	United Kingdom	For Ministry of War Transport.
5 October	Empire Conjuror	Bucket dredger	Fleming & Furguson Ltd.	Paisley	United Kingdom	For Ministry of War Transport.
6 October	Duncan L. Clinch	Liberty ship	J. A. Jones Construction Company	Brunswick, Georgia	United States	For War Shipping Administration.
6 October	J. D. Yeager	Liberty ship	Todd Houston Shipbuilding Corporation	Houston, Texas	United States	For War Shipping Administration.
6 October	Bandera	Haskell-class attack transport	California Shipbuilding Corporation	Los Angeles, California	United States	For United States Navy.
7 October	Abraham Rosenberg	Liberty ship	New England Shipbuilding Company	South Portland, Maine	United States	For War Shipping Administration.
7 October	Ales Hrdlicka	Liberty ship	Delta Shipbuilding Company	New Orleans, Louisiana	United States	For War Shipping Administration.
7 October	Marathon	Haskell-class attack transport	Kaiser Company	Vancouver, Washington	United States	For United States Navy
7 October	Neshoba	Haskell-class attack transport	Permanente Metals, #2 Yard	Richmond, California	United States	For United States Navy.
7 October	Empire Drury	Coastal tanker	Grangemouth Dockyard Co. Ltd.	Grangemouth	United Kingdom	For Ministry of War Transport.
8 October	Mission Los Angeles	T2 tanker	Marinship Corporation	Sausalito, California	United States	For United States Maritime Commission.
9 October	Freestone	Haskell-class attack transport	Oregon Shipbuilding Company	Portland, Oregon	United States	For United States Navy.
9 October	TID 117	TID-class tug	Richard Dunston Ltd.	Thorne	United Kingdom	For the Admiralty.
9 October	William Hackett	Liberty ship	Delta Shipbuilding Company	New Orleans, Louisiana	United States	For War Shipping Administration.
10 October	Empire Haig	Standard Fast type cargo liner	Lithgows Ltd.	Port Glasgow	United Kingdom	For Ministry of War Transport.
10 October	Faithful	Liberty ship	Bethlehem-Fairfield Shipyards	Baltimore, Maryland	United States	For War Shipping Administration.
10 October	Mayfield Victory	Victory ship	Permanente Metals, #1 Yard	Richmond, California	United States	For War Shipping Administration.
10 October	Morris C. Feinstone	Liberty ship	St. Johns River Shipbuilding Company	Jacksonville, Florida	United States	For War Shipping Administration.
10 October	Richard Halliburton	Liberty ship	J. A. Jones Construction Company	Panama City, Florida	United States	For War Shipping Administration.
10 October	U-3010	Type XXI submarine	AG Weser	Bremen	Germany	For Kriegsmarine
11 October	U-3511	Type XXI submarine	Schichau-Werke	Danzig	Germany	For Kriegsmarine
11 October	U-3512	Type XXI submarine	Schichau-Werke	Danzig	Germany	For Kriegsmarine
11 October	Johnny Appleseed	Liberty ship	Todd Houston Shipbuilding Corporation	Houston, Texas	United States	For War Shipping Administration.
11 October	Menard	Haskell-class attack transport	Kaiser Company	Vancouver, Washington	United States	For United States Navy
12 October	Abigail Gibbons	Liberty ship	J. A. Jones Construction Company	Brunswick, Georgia	United States	For War Shipping Administration.
12 October	Fort Stevens	T2 Tanker	Alabama Drydock and Shipbuilding Company	Mobile, Alabama	United States	For War Shipping Administration.
12 October	Joseph Murgas	Liberty ship	Southeastern Shipbuilding Corporation	Savannah, Georgia	United States	For War Shipping Administration.
12 October	New Kent	Haskell-class attack transport	Permanente Metals, #2 Yard	Richmond, California	United States	For United States Navy.
13 October	Pachaug Victory	Victory ship	Bethlehem-Fairfield Shipyards	Baltimore, Maryland	United States	For War Shipping Administration.
13 October	TID 118	TID-class tug	Richard Dunston Ltd.	Thorne	United Kingdom	For the Admiralty Ministry of War Transport.
13 October	U-2342	Type XXIII submarine	Deutsche Werft AG	Hamburg	Germany	For Kriegsmarine
13 October	U-2519	Type XXI submarine	Blohm + Voss	Hamburg	Germany	For Kriegsmarine
13 October	U-3012	Type XXI submarine	AG Weser	Bremen	Germany	For Kriegsmarine
14 October	Coalinga Hills	T2 tanker	Marinship Corporation	Sausalito, California	United States	For United States Maritime Commission.
14 October	Wilson B. Keene	Liberty ship	New England Shipbuilding Company	South Portland, Maine	United States	For War Shipping Administration.
14 October	Beckham	Haskell-class attack transport	California Shipbuilding Corporation	Los Angeles, California	United States	For United States Navy.
14 October	Gage	Haskell-class attack transport	Oregon Shipbuilding Company	Portland, Oregon	United States	For United States Navy.
15 October	Macon	Baltimore-class cruiser	New York Shipbuilding Corporation	Camden, New Jersey	United States	For United States Navy
15 October	Menifee	Haskell-class attack transport	Kaiser Company	Vancouver, Washington	United States	For United States Navy
15 October	Narraguagas	Mettawee-class gasoline tanker	East Coast Ship Yard	Bayonne, New Jersey	United States	For United States Navy
16 October	David L. Yulee	Liberty ship	St. Johns River Shipbuilding Company	Jacksonville, Florida	United States	For War Shipping Administration.
16 October	U-2520	Type XXI submarine	Blohm + Voss	Hamburg	Germany	For Kriegsmarine
16 October	Wave Emperor	Wave-class oiler	Furness Shipbuilding Co. Ltd.	Haverton Hill-on-Tees	United Kingdom	For Royal Fleet Auxiliary.
17 October	Anson Mills	Liberty ship	Todd Houston Shipbuilding Corporation	Houston, Texas	United States	For War Shipping Administration.
17 October	Charles Tufts	Liberty ship	New England Shipbuilding Company	South Portland, Maine	United States	For War Shipping Administration.
17 October	Empire Cheyne	Tudor Queen type coaster	John Lewis & Sons Ltd.	Aberdeen	United Kingdom	For Ministry of War Transport.
17 October	Kenyon L. Butterfield	Liberty ship	New England Shipbuilding Company	South Portland, Maine	United States	For War Shipping Administration.
17 October	Newcastle Victory	Victory ship	Permanente Metals, #1 Yard	Richmond, California	United States	For War Shipping Administration.
17 October	Paul Bunyan	Liberty ship	Todd Houston Shipbuilding Corporation	Houston, Texas	United States	For War Shipping Administration.
17 October	Samuel G. Howe	Liberty ship	J. A. Jones Construction Company	Panama City, Florida	United States	For War Shipping Administration.
17 October	Gallatin	Haskell-class attack transport	Oregon Shipbuilding Company	Portland, Oregon	United States	For United States Navy.
17 October	Empire Jean	Tug	Clelands (Successors) Ltd	Willington Quay-on-Tyne	United Kingdom	For Ministry of War Transport
17 October	Empire Mary	tug	Clelands (Successors) Ltd	Willington Quay-on-Tyne	United Kingdom	For Ministry of War Transport
18 October	Bert McDowell	Liberty ship	Bethlehem-Fairfield Shipyards	Baltimore, Maryland	United States	For War Shipping Administration.
18 October	Charles W. Stiles	Liberty ship	J. A. Jones Construction Company	Brunswick, Georgia	United States	For War Shipping Administration.
18 October	Empire Farjeon	Empire F type coaster	Goole Shipbuilding & Repairing Co. Ltd	Goole	United Kingdom	For Ministry of War Transport.
18 October	Loch Glendhu	Loch-class frigate	Burntisland Shipbuilding Company	Burntisland	United Kingdom	For Royal Navy.
18 October	Meriwether	Haskell-class attack transport	Kaiser Company	Vancouver, Washington	United States	For United States Navy
18 October	Noble	Haskell-class attack transport	Permanente Metals, #2 Yard	Richmond, California	United States	For United States Navy.
18 October	Vella Gulf	Commencement Bay-class escort carrier	Todd Pacific Shipyards	Tacoma, Washington	United States	For United States Navy
18 October	U-2343	Type XXIII submarine	Germaniawerft	Kiel	Germany	For Kriegsmarine
18 October	U-2521	Type XXI submarine	Blohm + Voss	Hamburg	Germany	For Kriegsmarine
19 October	Botetourt	Haskell-class attack transport	California Shipbuilding Corporation	Los Angeles, California	United States	For United States Navy.
19 October	Empire Allenby	Standard Fast type cargo liner	J. L. Thompson & Sons Ltd.	Sunderland	United Kingdom	For Ministry of War Transport.
19 October	Empire Bute	Coastal tanker	A & J Inglis Ltd	Glasgow	United Kingdom	For Ministry of War Transport
19 October	Samar	Liberty ship	Bethlehem-Fairfield Shipyards	Baltimore, Maryland	United States	For United States Navy.
19 October	TID 119	TID-class tug	Richard Dunston Ltd.	Thorne	United Kingdom	For the Admiralty.
19 October	U-3013	Type XXI submarine	AG Weser	Bremen	Germany	For Kriegsmarine
19 October	Widemouth Bay	Bay-class frigate	Harland & Wolff	Belfast	United Kingdom	For Royal Navy.
20 October	Robert Neighbors	Liberty ship	Todd Houston Shipbuilding Corporation	Houston, Texas	United States	For War Shipping Administration.
20 October	U-3011	Type XXI submarine	AG Weser	Bremen	Germany	For Kriegsmarine
20 October	Gosper	Haskell-class attack transport	Oregon Shipbuilding Company	Portland, Oregon	United States	For United States Navy.
21 October	Empire Guernsey	Isles-class coastal tanker	J. Harker Ltd.	Knottingley	United Kingdom	For Ministry of War Transport.
21 October	John W. Draper	Liberty ship	Delta Shipbuilding Company	New Orleans, Louisiana	United States	For War Shipping Administration.
21 October	Milton J. Foreman	Liberty ship	Southeastern Shipbuilding Corporation	Savannah, Georgia	United States	For War Shipping Administration.
21 October	Montebello Hills	T2 tanker	Marinship Corporation	Sausalito, California	United States	For United States Maritime Commission.
21 October	North Point	T2 Tanker	Alabama Drydock and Shipbuilding Company	Mobile, Alabama	United States	For War Shipping Administration.
21 October	William A. Dobson	Liberty ship	New England Shipbuilding Company	South Portland, Maine	United States	For War Shipping Administration.
21 October	Audubon	Haskell-class attack transport	Kaiser Company	Vancouver, Washington	United States	For United States Navy
21 October	Rawlins	Haskell-class attack transport	Kaiser Company	Vancouver, Washington	United States	
21 October	Empire Guernsey	Coastal tanker	J Harker Ltd	Knottingley	United Kingdom	For Ministry of War Transport
21 October	U-3513	Type XXI submarine	Schichau-Werke	Danzig	Germany	For Kriegsmarine
21 October	U-3514	Type XXI submarine	Schichau-Werke	Danzig	Germany	For Kriegsmarine
22 October	Malden Victory	Victory ship	Bethlehem-Fairfield Shipyards	Baltimore, Maryland	United States	For War Shipping Administration.
22 October	Okaloosa	Haskell-class attack transport	Permanente Metals, #2 Yard	Richmond, California	United States	For United States Navy.
22 October	U-2522	Type XXI submarine	Blohm + Voss	Hamburg	Germany	For Kriegsmarine
23 October	Fangturm	Hansa A type cargo ship	Deutsche Werft	Hamburg	Germany	For Hansa Line
23 October	George E. Waldo	Liberty ship	St. Johns River Shipbuilding Company	Jacksonville, Florida	United States	For War Shipping Administration.
23 October	Granville	Haskell-class attack transport	Oregon Shipbuilding Company	Portland, Oregon	United States	For United States Navy.
24 October	Francis B. Ogden	Liberty ship	Todd Houston Shipbuilding Corporation	Houston, Texas	United States	For War Shipping Administration.
24 October	Granville S. Hall	Liberty ship	J. A. Jones Construction Company	Panama City, Florida	United States	For War Shipping Administration.
24 October	King Hathaway	Liberty ship	Delta Shipbuilding Company	New Orleans, Louisiana	United States	For War Shipping Administration.
24 October	U-2344	Type XXIII submarine	Deutsche Werft AG	Hamburg	Germany	For Kriegsmarine
25 October	Murray M. Blum	Liberty ship	J. A. Jones Construction Company	Brunswick, Georgia	United States	For War Shipping Administration.
25 October	U-3014	Type XXI submarine	AG Weser	Bremen	Germany	For Kriegsmarine
25 October	Renville	Haskell-class attack transport	Kaiser Company	Vancouver, Washington	United States	For United States Navy
25 October	U-2523	Type XXI submarine	Blohm + Voss	Hamburg	Germany	For Kriegsmarine
26 October	Bland	Haskell-class attack transport	California Shipbuilding Corporation	Los Angeles, California	United States	For United States Navy.
26 October	Okanogan	Haskell-class attack transport	Permanente Metals, #2 Yard	Richmond, California	United States	For United States Navy.
26 October	TID 120	TID-class tug	Richard Dunston Ltd.	Thorne	United Kingdom	For the Admiralty.
27 October	Grimes	Haskell-class attack transport	Oregon Shipbuilding Company	Portland, Oregon	United States	For United States Navy.
27 October	Joseph S. McDonagh	Liberty ship	Southeastern Shipbuilding Corporation	Savannah, Georgia	United States	For War Shipping Administration.
27 October	Paulus Hook	T2 Tanker	Alabama Drydock and Shipbuilding Company	Mobile, Alabama	United States	For War Shipping Administration.
27 October	U-3015	Type XXI submarine	AG Weser	Bremen	Germany	For Kriegsmarine
28 October	Edwin S. Nettleton	Liberty ship	Todd Houston Shipbuilding Corporation	Houston, Texas	United States	For War Shipping Administration.
28 October	Harald Torsvik	Liberty ship	St. Johns River Shipbuilding Company	Jacksonville, Florida	United States	For War Shipping Administration.
28 October	Bosque	Haskell-class attack transport	California Shipbuilding Corporation	Los Angeles, California	United States	For United States Navy.
28 October	LST 3507	Landing Ship Tank, Mk.3	Davie Shipbuilding and Repairing Co. Ltd.	Lauzon, Quebec	Canada	For Royal Navy
28 October	Rockbridge	Haskell-class attack transport	Kaiser Company	Vancouver, Washington	United States	For United States Navy
28 October	U-2345	Type XXIII submarine	Deutsche Werft AG	Hamburg	Germany	For Kriegsmarine
29 October	Empire Mandalay	Cargo ship	Shipbuilding Corporation Ltd.	Sunderland	United Kingdom	For Ministry of War Transport.
29 October	Mission San Francisco	T2 tanker	Marinship Corporation	Sausalito, California	United States	For United States Maritime Commission.
29 October	TID 121	TID-class tug	Richard Dunston Ltd.	Thorne	United Kingdom	For the Admiralty.
30 October	Belgian Unity	Liberty ship	New England Shipbuilding Company	South Portland, Maine	United States	For War Shipping Administration.
30 October	Empire Clydesdale	Dredger	Lobnitz & Co. Ltd.	Renfrew	United Kingdom	For Ministry of War Transport.
30 October	Empire Drover	Tudor Queen type coaster	Ardrossan Dockyard Ltd.	Ardrossan	United Kingdom	For Ministry of War Transport.
30 October	Empire Canning	Cargo ship	Caledon Shipbuilding & Engineering Co Ltd	Dundee	United Kingdom	For Ministry of War Transport
30 October	Empire Kumasi	Cargo ship	William Hamilton & Co. Ltd.	Port Glasgow	United Kingdom	For the Ministry of War Transport.
30 October	Empire Mauritius	Cargo ship	Bartram & Sons Ltd	Sunderland	United Kingdom	For Ministry of War Transport.
30 October	Hyde	Haskell-class attack transport	Oregon Shipbuilding Company	Portland, Oregon	United States	For United States Navy.
30 October	Laura Bridgman	Liberty ship	J. A. Jones Construction Company	Brunswick, Georgia	United States	For War Shipping Administration.
30 October	Quaker Hill	T2 Tanker	Alabama Drydock and Shipbuilding Company	Mobile, Alabama	United States	For War Shipping Administration.
30 October	U-2524	Type XXI submarine	Blohm + Voss	Hamburg	Germany	For Kriegsmarine
30 October	U-2525	Type XXI submarine	Blohm + Voss	Hamburg	Germany	For Kriegsmarine
31 October	Bucyrus Victory	Victory ship	Permanente Metals, #1 Yard	Richmond, California	United States	For War Shipping Administration.
31 October	Empire Jumna	Empire Pym type tanker	Grangemouth Dockyard Co. Ltd.	Grangemouth	United Kingdom	For Ministry of War Transport.
31 October	LST 3008	Landing Ship, Tank	Harland & Wolff	Belfast	United Kingdom	For Royal Navy.
31 October	LST 3041	Landing Ship, Tank	Harland & Wolff	Belfast	United Kingdom	For Royal Navy.
31 October	Montebello Park	Park ship	Victoria Machinery Co. Ltd.	Victoria, British Columbia	Canada	For Ministry of War Transport.
31 October	Reward	Bustler-class tug	Henry Robb Ltd.	Leith	United Kingdom	For the Admiralty.
31 October	Roxburgh Castle	Refrigerated cargo ship	Harland & Wolff	Belfast	United Kingdom	For Union-Castle Line.
31 October	Solway Firth	Aircraft engine repair ship	Short Brothers Ltd.	Sunderland	United Kingdom	For Admiralty. Completed in 1947 as the cargo ship Kongsberg for Skibsrederi Kongsborg.
31 October	Stephen Smith	Liberty ship	J. A. Jones Construction Company	Panama City, Florida	United States	For War Shipping Administration.
31 October	Westerly Victory	Victory ship	Bethlehem-Fairfield Shipyards	Baltimore, Maryland	United States	For War Shipping Administration.
31 October	Bowie	Haskell-class attack transport	California Shipbuilding Corporation	Los Angeles, California	United States	For United States Navy.
31 October	Oneida	Haskell-class attack transport	Permanente Metals, #2 Yard	Richmond, California	United States	For United States Navy.
31 October	U-2346	Type XXIII submarine	Deutsche Werft AG	Hamburg	Germany	For Kriegsmarine
October	Empire Facility	Empire F type coaster	Henry Scarr Ltd	Hessle	United Kingdom	For Ministry of War Transport.
October	Empire Fanal	Empire F type coaster	Henry Scarr Ltd	Hessle	United Kingdom	For Ministry of War Transport.
October	Empire Faraway	Empire F type coaster	Henry Scarr Ltd	Hessle	United Kingdom	For Ministry of War Transport.

== November ==
Date	Ship	Class / type	Builder	Location	Country	Notes
1 November	Rockingham	Haskell-class attack transport	Kaiser Company	Vancouver, Washington	United States	For United States Navy
2 November	Frederic W. Galbraith	Liberty ship	St. Johns River Shipbuilding Company	Jacksonville, Florida	United States	For War Shipping Administration.
2 November	Pontus H. Ross	Liberty ship	Todd Houston Shipbuilding Corporation	Houston, Texas	United States	For War Shipping Administration.
2 November	Lake Champlain	Essex-class aircraft carrier	Norfolk Navy Yard	Norfolk, Virginia	United States	For United States Navy
2 November	U-3016	Type XXI submarine	AG Weser	Bremen	Germany	For Kriegsmarine
2 November	VIC 33	VIC lighter	Isaac Pimblott & Sons Ltd.	Northwich	United Kingdom	For Ministry of War Transport.
2 November	Name unknown	Cargo ship	William Gray & Co. Ltd.	West Hartlepool	United Kingdom	An Empire ship for Ministry of War Transport. Requisitioned by the Admiralty. Completed as HMS Cuillin Sound.
3 November	Belle Isle	Liberty ship	New England Shipbuilding Company	South Portland, Maine	United States	For War Shipping Administration.
3 November	Josiah Tattnell	Liberty ship	Southeastern Shipbuilding Corporation	Savannah, Georgia	United States	For War Shipping Administration.
3 November	Liguria	Liberty ship	New England Shipbuilding Company	South Portland, Maine	United States	For War Shipping Administration.
3 November	Winthrop L. Marvin	Liberty ship	New England Shipbuilding Company	South Portland, Maine	United States	For War Shipping Administration.
3 November	Braxton	Haskell-class attack transport	California Shipbuilding Corporation	Los Angeles, California	United States	For United States Navy.
3 November	Jerauld	Haskell-class attack transport	Oregon Shipbuilding Company	Portland, Oregon	United States	For United States Navy.
4 November	Empire Facet	Empire F type coaster	Goole Shipbuilding & Repairing Co. Ltd	Goole	United Kingdom	For Ministry of War Transport.
4 November	Matthew Sheehan	Liberty ship	New England Shipbuilding Company	South Portland, Maine	United States	For War Shipping Administration.
4 November	U-3515	Type XXI submarine	Schichau-Werke	Danzig	Germany	For Kriegsmarine
4 November	U-3516	Type XXI submarine	Schichau-Werke	Danzig	Germany	For Kriegsmarine
4 November	Oneida Victory	Victory ship	Bethlehem-Fairfield Shipyards	Baltimore, Maryland	United States	For War Shipping Administration.
4 November	Richard Randall	Liberty ship	J. A. Jones Construction Company	Brunswick, Georgia	United States	For War Shipping Administration.
5 November	Broadwater	Haskell-class attack transport	California Shipbuilding Corporation	Los Angeles, California	United States	For United States Navy.
5 November	Pickaway	Haskell-class attack transport	Permanente Metals, #2 Yard	Richmond, California	United States	For United States Navy.
5 November	Rockwall	Haskell-class attack transport	Kaiser Company	Vancouver, Washington	United States	For United States Navy
5 November	TID 122	TID-class tug	Richard Dunston Ltd.	Thorne	United Kingdom	For the Admiralty.
5 November	U-3017	Type XXI submarine	AG Weser	Bremen	Germany	For Kriegsmarine
5 November	VIC 47	VIC lighter	Richard Dunston Ltd.	Thorne	United Kingdom	For the Admiralty.
6 November	George W. Cable	Liberty ship	Delta Shipbuilding Company	New Orleans, Louisiana	United States	For War Shipping Administration.
6 November	Helena Modjeska	Liberty ship	Delta Shipbuilding Company	New Orleans, Louisiana	United States	For War Shipping Administration.
6 November	U-2347	Type XXIII submarine	Deutsche Werft AG	Hamburg	Germany	For Kriegsmarine
7 November	Charles D. Walcott	Liberty ship	J. A. Jones Construction Company	Panama City, Florida	United States	For War Shipping Administration.
7 November	Karnes	Haskell-class attack transport	Oregon Shipbuilding Company	Portland, Oregon	United States	For United States Navy.
8 November	C. W. Post	Liberty ship	St. Johns River Shipbuilding Company	Jacksonville, Florida	United States	For War Shipping Administration.
8 November	Clarence Roberts	Liberty ship	Todd Houston Shipbuilding Corporation	Houston, Texas	United States	For War Shipping Administration.
9 November	Edward R. Squibb	Liberty ship	J. A. Jones Construction Company	Brunswick, Georgia	United States	For War Shipping Administration.
9 November	Moina Michael	Liberty ship	Southeastern Shipbuilding Corporation	Savannah, Georgia	United States	For War Shipping Administration.
9 November	U-3018	Type XXI submarine	AG Weser	Bremen	Germany	For Kriegsmarine
9 November	Red Oak Victory	Victory ship	Permanente Metals, #1 Yard	Richmond, California	United States	For War Shipping Administration.
9 November	Saint Croix	Haskell-class attack transport	Kaiser Company	Vancouver, Washington	United States	For United States Navy
9 November	Siboney	Commencement Bay-class escort carrier	Todd Pacific Shipyards	Tacoma, Washington	United States	For United States Navy
9 November	TID 123	TID-class tug	Richard Dunston Ltd.	Thorne	United Kingdom	For the Admiralty.
10 November	Pitt	Haskell-class attack transport	Permanente Metals, #2 Yard	Richmond, California	United States	For United States Navy.
10 November	Red Bank	T2 Tanker	Alabama Drydock and Shipbuilding Company	Mobile, Alabama	United States	For War Shipping Administration.
11 November	Empire Mars	Wave-class oiler	Sir J. Laing & Sons Ltd.	Sunderland	United Kingdom	For Ministry of War Transport. Completed as RFA Wave Duke for Royal Fleet Auxiliary.
11 November	Frederick Bouchard	Liberty ship	New England Shipbuilding Company	South Portland, Maine	United States	For War Shipping Administration.
11 November	Inglewood Hills	T2 tanker	Marinship Corporation	Sausalito, California	United States	For United States Maritime Commission.
11 November	Joseph Weydemeyer	Liberty ship	Delta Shipbuilding Company	New Orleans, Louisiana	United States	For War Shipping Administration.
11 November	LST 3014	LST (3)	Barclay, Curle & Co. Ltd.	Glasgow	United Kingdom	For Royal Navy.
11 November	Towanda Victory	Victory ship	Bethlehem-Fairfield Shipyards	Baltimore, Maryland	United States	For War Shipping Administration.
11 November	U-2348	Type XXIII submarine	Deutsche Werft AG	Hamburg	Germany	For Kriegsmarine
11 November	U-3517	Type XXI submarine	Schichau-Werke	Danzig	Germany	For Kriegsmarine
11 November	U-3518	Type XXI submarine	Schichau-Werke	Danzig	Germany	For Kriegsmarine
12 November	Kershaw	Haskell-class attack transport	Oregon Shipbuilding Company	Portland, Oregon	United States	For United States Navy.
12 November	San Saba	Haskell-class attack transport	Kaiser Company	Vancouver, Washington	United States	For United States Navy
13 November	Art Young	Liberty ship	J. A. Jones Construction Company	Panama City, Florida	United States	For War Shipping Administration.
13 November	Empire Fang	Empire F type coaster	Goole Shipbuilding & Repairing Co. Ltd	Goole	United Kingdom	For Ministry of War Transport.
13 November	Otis E. Hall	Liberty ship	Todd Houston Shipbuilding Corporation	Houston, Texas	United States	For War Shipping Administration.
13 November	Buckingham	Haskell-class attack transport	California Shipbuilding Corporation	Los Angeles, California	United States	For United States Navy.
14 November	Junius Smith	Liberty ship	St. Johns River Shipbuilding Company	Jacksonville, Florida	United States	For War Shipping Administration.
14 November	TID 124	TID-class tug	Richard Dunston Ltd.	Thorne	United Kingdom	For the Admiralty.
15 November	Empire Singapore	Cargo ship	William Doxford & Sons Ltd.	Pallion	United Kingdom	For Ministry of War Transport.
15 November	Grand River	T2 Tanker	Alabama Drydock and Shipbuilding Company	Mobile, Alabama	United States	For War Shipping Administration.
15 November	John H. Hammond	Liberty ship	J. A. Jones Construction Company	Brunswick, Georgia	United States	For War Shipping Administration.
15 November	Kingfisher	Cargo ship	Henry Robb Ltd.	Leith	United Kingdom	For General Steam Navigation Co. Ltd.
15 November	Randall	Haskell-class attack transport	Permanente Metals, #2 Yard	Richmond, California	United States	For United States Navy.
15 November	U-3019	Type XXI submarine	AG Weser	Bremen	Germany	For Kriegsmarine
16 November	Charles L. McNary	Liberty ship	Todd Houston Shipbuilding Corporation	Houston, Texas	United States	For War Shipping Administration.
16 November	Empire Fancy	Cargo ship	Burntisland Shipbuilding Company	Burntisland	United Kingdom	For Ministry of War Transport.
16 November	Empire Jamaica	Empire Malta-class Scandinavian type cargo ship	William Gray & Co. Ltd.	West Hartlepool	United Kingdom	For Ministry of War Transport.
16 November	Magnificent	Majestic-class aircraft carrier	Harland and Wolff	Belfast	United Kingdom	For Royal Canadian Navy
16 November	Montclair Victory	Victory ship	Bethlehem-Fairfield Shipyards	Baltimore, Maryland	United States	For War Shipping Administration.
16 November	Robert Parrot	Liberty ship	Southeastern Shipbuilding Corporation	Savannah, Georgia	United States	For War Shipping Administration.
16 November	Kingsbury	Haskell-class attack transport	Oregon Shipbuilding Company	Portland, Oregon	United States	For United States Navy.
16 November	Sevier	Haskell-class attack transport	Kaiser Company	Vancouver, Washington	United States	For United States Navy
16 November	U-2333	Type XXIII submarine	Germaniawerft	Kiel	Germany	For Kriegsmarine
16 November	U-3020	Type XXI submarine	AG Weser	Bremen	Germany	For Kriegsmarine
16 November	VIC 79	Improved VIC lighter	Richards Ironworks Ltd.	Lowestoft	United Kingdom	For the Admiralty.
17 November	Charles H. Marshall	Liberty ship	J. A. Jones Construction Company	Panama City, Florida	United States	For War Shipping Administration.
17 November	Coasters Harbor	Liberty ship	New England Shipbuilding Company	South Portland, Maine	United States	For War Shipping Administration.
17 November	Edmond Mallet	Liberty ship	New England Shipbuilding Company	South Portland, Maine	United States	For War Shipping Administration.
17 November	Lakewood Victory	Victory ship	Permanente Metals, #1 Yard	Richmond, California	United States	For War Shipping Administration.
17 November	Newcombia	Tanker	Harland & Wolff Ltd.	Belfast	United Kingdom	For Anglo-Saxon Petroleum Co. Ltd.
18 November	Bert Williams	Liberty ship	New England Shipbuilding Company	South Portland, Maine	United States	For War Shipping Administration.
18 November	Claymont Victory	Victory ship	Bethlehem-Fairfield Shipyards	Baltimore, Maryland	United States	For War Shipping Administration.
18 November	Cyril G. Hopkins	Liberty ship	Todd Houston Shipbuilding Corporation	Houston, Texas	United States	For War Shipping Administration.
18 November	Fort Rosalie	Fort ship	United Shipyards Ltd.	Montreal	Canada	For Ministry of War Transport.
18 November	Sam Dale	Liberty ship	Delta Shipbuilding Company	New Orleans, Louisiana	United States	For War Shipping Administration.
18 November	St Austell Bay	Bay-class frigate	Harland & Wolff	Belfast	United Kingdom	For Royal Navy.
18 November	Valley Forge	Essex-class aircraft carrier	Philadelphia Navy Yard	Philadelphia	United States	For United States Navy
18 November	U-2528	Type XXI submarine	Blohm + Voss	Hamburg	Germany	For Kriegsmarine
18 November	U-2529	Type XXI submarine	Blohm + Voss	Hamburg	Germany	For Kriegsmarine
18 November	VIC 60	VIC lighter	Isaac Pimblott & Sons Ltd.	Northwich	United Kingdom	For the Admiralty.
19 November	Baldwin Hills	T2 tanker	Marinship Corporation	Sausalito, California	United States	For United States Maritime Commission.
19 November	Isaac M. Singer	Liberty ship	St. Johns River Shipbuilding Company	Jacksonville, Florida	United States	For War Shipping Administration.
19 November	William H. Kendrick	Liberty ship	Delta Shipbuilding Company	New Orleans, Louisiana	United States	For War Shipping Administration.
19 November	Bollinger	Haskell-class attack transport	Kaiser Company	Vancouver, Washington	United States	For United States Navy
19 November	Lander	Haskell-class attack transport	Oregon Shipbuilding Company	Portland, Oregon	United States	For United States Navy.
19 November	Empire Byng	Heavy lift ship	Greenock Dockyard Company	Greenock	United Kingdom	For Ministry of War Transport
20 November	Blue Ridge Victory	Victory ship	Bethlehem-Fairfield Shipyards	Baltimore, Maryland	United States	For War Shipping Administration.
20 November	Bingham	Haskell-class attack transport	Permanente Metals, #2 Yard	Richmond, California	United States	For United States Navy.
20 November	Brookings	Haskell-class attack transport	California Shipbuilding Corporation	Los Angeles, California	United States	For United States Navy.
20 November	TID 126	TID-class tug	Richard Dunston Ltd.	Thorne	United Kingdom	For the Admiralty.
20 November	U-2349	Type XXIII submarine	Deutsche Werft AG	Hamburg	Germany	For Kriegsmarine
21 November	Albert K. Smiley	Liberty ship	J. A. Jones Construction Company	Brunswick, Georgia	United States	For War Shipping Administration.
21 November	Ransom A. Moore	Liberty ship	J. A. Jones Construction Company	Panama City, Florida	United States	For War Shipping Administration.
21 November	Clearfield	Haskell-class attack transport	California Shipbuilding Corporation	Los Angeles, California	United States	For United States Navy.
21 November	Empire Race	Tug	Henry Scarr Ltd	Hessle	United Kingdom	For Ministry of War Transport
22 November	I. B. Perrine	Liberty ship	Todd Houston Shipbuilding Corporation	Houston, Texas	United States	For War Shipping Administration.
22 November	Bottineau	Haskell-class attack transport	Kaiser Company	Vancouver, Washington	United States	For United States Navy
22 November	Cottonwood Creek	T2 Tanker	Alabama Drydock and Shipbuilding Company	Mobile, Alabama	United States	For War Shipping Administration.
22 November	U-2350	Type XXIII submarine	Deutsche Werft AG	Hamburg	Germany	For Kriegsmarine
23 November	Josiah Cohen	Liberty ship	Southeastern Shipbuilding Corporation	Savannah, Georgia	United States	For War Shipping Administration.
23 November	Telfair Stockton	Liberty ship	St. Johns River Shipbuilding Company	Jacksonville, Florida	United States	For War Shipping Administration.
23 November	Lauderdale	Haskell-class attack transport	Oregon Shipbuilding Company	Portland, Oregon	United States	For United States Navy.
23 November	U-2530	Type XXI submarine	Blohm + Voss	Hamburg	Germany	For Kriegsmarine
23 November	U-3519	Type XXI submarine	Schichau-Werke	Danzig	Germany	For Kriegsmarine
23 November	U-3520	Type XXI submarine	Schichau-Werke	Danzig	Germany	For Kriegsmarine
24 November	Paul David Jones	Liberty ship	Todd Houston Shipbuilding Corporation	Houston, Texas	United States	For War Shipping Administration.
24 November	Salina Victory	Victory ship	Permanente Metals, #1 Yard	Richmond, California	United States	For War Shipping Administration.
25 November	Fairmont Victory	Victory ship	Bethlehem-Fairfield Shipyards	Baltimore, Maryland	United States	For War Shipping Administration.
25 November	Fort Sandusky	Fort ship	United Shipyards Ltd	Montreal	Canada	For Ministry of War Transport.
25 November	Ira Nelson Morris	Liberty ship	J. A. Jones Construction Company	Brunswick, Georgia	United States	For War Shipping Administration.
25 November	Clermont	Haskell-class attack transport	California Shipbuilding Corporation	Los Angeles, California	United States	For United States Navy.
25 November	U-2351	Type XXIII submarine	Deutsche Werft AG	Hamburg	Germany	For Kriegsmarine
25 November	VIC 48	VIC lighter	Richard Dunston Ltd.	Thorne	United Kingdom	For the Admiralty.
26 November	Cuttyhunk Island	Liberty ship	New England Shipbuilding Company	South Portland, Maine	United States	For War Shipping Administration.
26 November	Cottle	Haskell-class attack transport	Kaiser Company	Vancouver, Washington	United States	For United States Navy
26 November	McKittrick Hills	T2 tanker	Marinship Corporation	Sausalito, California	United States	For United States Maritime Commission.
27 November	Empire Rabaul	Cargo ship	John Readhead & Sons Ltd.	South Shields	United Kingdom	For Ministry of War Transport.
27 November	Lavaca	Haskell-class attack transport	Oregon Shipbuilding Company	Portland, Oregon	United States	For United States Navy.
27 November	Little Butte	T2 Tanker	Alabama Drydock and Shipbuilding Company	Mobile, Alabama	United States	For War Shipping Administration.
27 November	Soter Ortynsky	Liberty ship	J. A. Jones Construction Company	Panama City, Florida	United States	For War Shipping Administration.
27 November	U-3021	Type XXI submarine	AG Weser	Bremen	Germany	For Kriegsmarine
28 November	Anchorage Victory	Victory ship	Permanente Metals, #2 Yard	Richmond, California	United States	For War Shipping Administration.
28 November	Crockett	Haskell-class attack transport	Kaiser Company	Vancouver, Washington	United States	For United States Navy
28 November	Empire Morley	Cargo ship	Shipbuilding Corporation Ltd.	Newcastle upon Tyne	United Kingdom	For Ministry of War Transport.
29 November	Louis Bamberger	Liberty ship	St. Johns River Shipbuilding Company	Jacksonville, Florida	United States	For War Shipping Administration.
29 November	Rudolph Kauffmann	Liberty ship	Southeastern Shipbuilding Corporation	Savannah, Georgia	United States	For War Shipping Administration.
29 November	Will B. Otwell	Liberty ship	Todd Houston Shipbuilding Corporation	Houston, Texas	United States	For War Shipping Administration.
29 November	Clinton	Haskell-class attack transport	California Shipbuilding Corporation	Los Angeles, California	United States	For United States Navy.
30 November	Opossum	Modified Black Swan-class sloop			United Kingdom	For Royal Navy
30 November	Aiken Victory	Victory ship	Bethlehem-Fairfield Shipyards	Baltimore, Maryland	United States	For War Shipping Administration.
30 November	Bjarne A. Lia	Liberty ship	J. A. Jones Construction Company	Panama City, Florida	United States	For War Shipping Administration.
30 November	Empire Orkney	Coastal tanker	A. & J. Inglis Ltd.	Glasgow	United Kingdom	For Ministry of War Transport.
30 November	Fort Ridgely	T2 Tanker	Alabama Drydock and Shipbuilding Company	Mobile, Alabama	United States	For War Shipping Administration.
30 November	Hastings Victory	Victory ship	Permanente Metals, #1 Yard	Richmond, California	United States	For War Shipping Administration.
30 November	Longview Victory	Victory ship	Oregon Shipbuilding Company	Portland, Oregon	United States	For War Shipping Administration.
30 November	Columbus	Baltimore-class cruiser	Bethlehem Steel Company	Quincy, Massachusetts	United States	For United States Navy
30 November	Puget Sound	Commencement Bay-class escort carrier	Todd Pacific Shipyards	Tacoma, Washington	United States	For United States Navy
30 November	Empire Orkney	Coaster	A. & J. Inglis	Glasgow	United Kingdom	For Ministry of War Transport
30 November	Empire Vauxhall	Icemaid type collier	Grangemouth Dockyard Co. Ltd.	Grangemouth	United Kingdom	For Ministry of War Transport.
30 November	U-2526	Type XXI submarine	Blohm + Voss	Hamburg	Germany	For Kriegsmarine
30 November	U-2527	Type XXI submarine	Blohm + Voss	Hamburg	Germany	For Kriegsmarine
30 November	U-3022	Type XXI submarine	AG Weser	Bremen	Germany	For Kriegsmarine
30 November	Vanguard	Vanguard-class battleship	John Brown and Company	Clydebank	United Kingdom	For Royal Navy
30 November	Wave Governor	Wave-class oiler	Furness Shipbuilding Co. Ltd.	Haverton Hill-on-Tees	United Kingdom	For Royal Fleet Auxiliary.
30 November	Weybank	Cargo ship	William Doxford & Sons Ltd.	Pallion	United Kingdom	For Bank Line Ltd.
November	Empire Farrier	Empire F type coaster	Henry Scarr Ltd	Hessle	United Kingdom	For Ministry of War Transport.
November	Empire Fastness	Empire F type coaster	Henry Scarr Ltd	Hessle	United Kingdom	For Ministry of War Transport.

== December ==
Date	Ship	Class / type	Builder	Location	Country	Notes
1 December	Colbert	Haskell-class attack transport	California Shipbuilding Corporation	Los Angeles, California	United States	For United States Navy.
December	TID 127	TID-class tug	Richard Dunston Ltd.	Thorne	United Kingdom	For the Admiralty.
2 December	Colorado Springs Victory	Victory ship	Permanente Metals, #2 Yard	Richmond, California	United States	For War Shipping Administration.
2 December	Empire Phyllis	Modified Warrior-type tug	John Crown & Sons Ltd.	Sunderland	United Kingdom	For the Admiralty (United Kingdom).
2 December	George W. Norris	Liberty ship	J. A. Jones Construction Company	Brunswick, Georgia	United States	For War Shipping Administration.
2 December	James Eagan Layne	Liberty ship	Delta Shipbuilding Company	New Orleans, Louisiana	United States	For War Shipping Administration.
2 December	Lewiston Victory	Victory ship	Oregon Shipbuilding Company	Portland, Oregon	United States	For War Shipping Administration.
2 December	Collingsworth	Haskell-class attack transport	California Shipbuilding Corporation	Los Angeles, California	United States	For United States Navy.
2 December	U-3023	Type XXI submarine	AG Weser	Bremen	Germany	For Kriegsmarine
2 December	Empire Becky	Near-Warrior type tug	Henry Scarr Ltd.	Hessle	United Kingdom	For Ministry of War Transport.
3 December	U-3521	Type XXI submarine	Schichau-Werke	Danzig	Germany	For Kriegsmarine
3 December	U-3522	Type XXI submarine	Schichau-Werke	Danzig	Germany	For Kriegsmarine
3 December	Joseph Lee	Liberty ship	New England Shipbuilding Company	South Portland, Maine	United States	For War Shipping Administration.
3 December	Thomas F. Meagher	Liberty ship	New England Shipbuilding Company	South Portland, Maine	United States	For War Shipping Administration.
4 December	Calvin Austin	Liberty ship	New England Shipbuilding Company	South Portland, Maine	United States	For War Shipping Administration.
4 December	Chapel Hill Victory	Victory ship	Bethlehem-Fairfield Shipyards	Baltimore, Maryland	United States	For War Shipping Administration.
4 December	Jacob Chandler Harper	Liberty ship	Todd Houston Shipbuilding Corporation	Houston, Texas	United States	For War Shipping Administration.
4 December	Martin Behrman	Liberty ship	Delta Shipbuilding Company	New Orleans, Louisiana	United States	For War Shipping Administration.
4 December	Minot Victory	Victory ship	Oregon Shipbuilding Company	Portland, Oregon	United States	For War Shipping Administration.
5 December	Eufaula Victory	Victory ship	Bethlehem-Fairfield Shipyards	Baltimore, Maryland	United States	For War Shipping Administration.
5 December	James H. Price	Liberty ship	Southeastern Shipbuilding Corporation	Savannah, Georgia	United States	For War Shipping Administration.
5 December	Bergen	Haskell-class attack transport	Kaiser Company	Vancouver, Washington	United States	For United States Navy
5 December	U-2352	Type XXIII submarine	Deutsche Werft AG	Hamburg	Germany	For Kriegsmarine
5 December	U-2531	Type XXI submarine	Blohm + Voss	Hamburg	Germany	For Kriegsmarine
6 December	Arthur M. Hulbert	Liberty ship	J. A. Jones Construction Company	Brunswick, Georgia	United States	For War Shipping Administration.
6 December	Isaac Mayer Wise	Liberty ship	St. Johns River Shipbuilding Company	Jacksonville, Florida	United States	For War Shipping Administration.
6 December	Jericho Victory	Victory ship	California Shipbuilding Corporation	Los Angeles, California	United States	For War Shipping Administration.
6 December	Newhall Hills	T2 tanker	Marinship Corporation	Sausalito, California	United States	For United States Maritime Commission.
6 December	Pierre Victory	Victory ship	Oregon Shipbuilding Company	Portland, Oregon	United States	For War Shipping Administration.
6 December	U-2353	Type XXIII submarine	Deutsche Werft AG	Hamburg	Germany	For Kriegsmarine
6 December	U-3024	Type XXI submarine	AG Weser	Bremen	Germany	For Kriegsmarine
7 December	Harold D. Whitehead	Liberty ship	Todd Houston Shipbuilding Corporation	Houston, Texas	United States	For War Shipping Administration.
7 December	Muncie Victory	Victory ship	Permanente Metals, #2 Yard	Richmond, California	United States	For War Shipping Administration.
7 December	TID 128	TID-class tug	Richard Dunston Ltd.	Thorne	United Kingdom	For the Admiralty Ministry of War Transport.
7 December	U-2532	Type XXI submarine	Blohm + Voss	Hamburg	Germany	For Kriegsmarine
7 December	U-2533	Type XXI submarine	Blohm + Voss	Hamburg	Germany	For Kriegsmarine
8 December	Elko Victory	Victory ship	Permanente Metals, #1 Yard	Richmond, California	United States	For War Shipping Administration.
9 December	Bozeman Victory	Victory ship	Oregon Shipbuilding Company	Portland, Oregon	United States	For War Shipping Administration.
9 December	Wendell L. Willkie	Liberty ship	J. A. Jones Construction Company	Panama City, Florida	United States	For War Shipping Administration.
9 December	U-3025	Type XXI submarine	AG Weser	Bremen	Germany	For Kriegsmarine
10 December	U-2354	Type XXIII submarine	Deutsche Werft AG	Hamburg	Germany	For Kriegsmarine
11 December	Andreas Honcharenko	Liberty ship	Delta Shipbuilding Company	New Orleans, Louisiana	United States	For War Shipping Administration.
11 December	Benjamin A. Fisher	Liberty ship	Delta Shipbuilding Company	New Orleans, Louisiana	United States	For War Shipping Administration.
11 December	Henry B. Plant	Liberty ship	St. Johns River Shipbuilding Company	Jacksonville, Florida	United States	For War Shipping Administration.
11 December	Valdosta Victory	Victory ship	Bethlehem-Fairfield Shipyards	Baltimore, Maryland	United States	For War Shipping Administration.
11 December	U-2534	Type XXI submarine	Blohm + Voss	Hamburg	Germany	For Kriegsmarine
12 December	Elgin Victory	Victory ship	Permanente Metals, #2 Yard	Richmond, California	United States	For War Shipping Administration.
12 December	Koloa Victory	Victory ship	California Shipbuilding Corporation	Los Angeles, California	United States	For War Shipping Administration.
12 December	M. E. Comerford	Liberty ship	J. A. Jones Construction Company	Brunswick, Georgia	United States	For War Shipping Administration.
12 December	Rogue River	T2 Tanker	Alabama Drydock and Shipbuilding Company	Mobile, Alabama	United States	For War Shipping Administration.
12 December	Saginaw Victory	Victory ship	Oregon Shipbuilding Company	Portland, Oregon	United States	For War Shipping Administration.
13 December	Avery Island	Liberty ship	New England Shipbuilding Company	South Portland, Maine	United States	For War Shipping Administration.
13 December	T. A. Johnston	Liberty ship	J. A. Jones Construction Company	Panama City, Florida	United States	For War Shipping Administration.
13 December	TID 129	TID-class tug	Richard Dunston Ltd.	Thorne	United Kingdom	For the Admiralty.
13 December	U-2355	Type XXIII submarine	Deutsche Werft AG	Hamburg	Germany	For Kriegsmarine
13 December	William L. McLean	Liberty ship	Southeastern Shipbuilding Corporation	Savannah, Georgia	United States	For War Shipping Administration.
14 December	Clyde Austin Dunning	Liberty ship	Todd Houston Shipbuilding Corporation	Houston, Texas	United States	For War Shipping Administration.
14 December	Felix Riesenberg	Liberty ship	J. A. Jones Construction Company	Brunswick, Georgia	United States	For War Shipping Administration.
14 December	Boxer	Essex-class aircraft carrier	Bethlehem Shipbuilding	Quincy, Massachusetts	United States	For United States Navy
14 December	U-4701	Type XXIII submarine	Germaniawerft	Kiel	Germany	For Kriegsmarine
14 December	U-3026	Type XXI submarine	AG Weser	Bremen	Germany	For Kriegsmarine
14 December	U-3523	Type XXI submarine	Schichau-Werke	Danzig	Germany	For Kriegsmarine
14 December	U-3524	Type XXI submarine	Schichau-Werke	Danzig	Germany	For Kriegsmarine
15 December	Cody Victory	Victory ship	California Shipbuilding Corporation	Los Angeles, California	United States	For War Shipping Administration.
15 December	Coeur d'Alene Victory	Victory ship	Oregon Shipbuilding Company	Portland, Oregon	United States	For War Shipping Administration.
15 December	James Kyron Walker	Liberty ship	Todd Houston Shipbuilding Corporation	Houston, Texas	United States	For War Shipping Administration.
15 December	Empire Sandboy	Bucket dredger	William Simons & Co. Ltd.	Renfrew	United Kingdom	For Ministry of War Transport.
16 December	Durango Victory	Victory ship	Permanente Metals, #1 Yard	Richmond, California	United States	For War Shipping Administration.
16 December	Edward J. Berwind	Liberty ship	Southeastern Shipbuilding Corporation	Savannah, Georgia	United States	For War Shipping Administration.
16 December	Empire Ensign	Intermediate type tanker	J. L. Thompson & Sons Ltd.	Sunderland	United Kingdom	For Ministry of War Transport.
16 December	Empire Fairplay	Empire F type coaster	Goole Shipbuilding & Repairing Co. Ltd	Goole	United Kingdom	For Ministry of War Transport.
16 December	I-204	I-201-class submarine	Kure Naval Arsenal	Kure, Hiroshima	Japan	For Imperial Japanese Navy
16 December	Massillon Victory	Victory ship	Permanente Metals, #2 Yard	Richmond, California	United States	For War Shipping Administration.
16 December	Walter M. Christiansen	Liberty ship	St. Johns River Shipbuilding Company	Jacksonville, Florida	United States	For War Shipping Administration.
16 December	U-2535	Type XXI submarine	Blohm + Voss	Hamburg	Germany	For Kriegsmarine
16 December	U-2536	Type XXI submarine	Blohm + Voss	Hamburg	Germany	For Kriegsmarine
16 December	VIC 55	VIC lighter	J. S. Watson (Gainsborough) Ltd.	Gainsborough	United Kingdom	For the Admiralty.
16 December	VIC 82	VIC lighter	J. Harker Ltd.	Knottingley	United Kingdom	For the Admiralty.
16 December	Whitesand Bay	Bay-class frigate	Harland & Wolff	Belfast	United Kingdom	For Royal Navy.
17 December	Joshua Slocum	Liberty ship	New England Shipbuilding Company	South Portland, Maine	United States	For War Shipping Administration.
17 December	Julia P. Shaw	Liberty ship	New England Shipbuilding Company	South Portland, Maine	United States	For War Shipping Administration.
17 December	Paul Buck	Liberty ship	New England Shipbuilding Company	South Portland, Maine	United States	For War Shipping Administration.
17 December	Rincon Hills	T2 tanker	Marinship Corporation	Sausalito, California	United States	For United States Maritime Commission.
18 December	Empire Balham	Tudor Queen type coaster	G. Brown & Co. (Marine) Ltd.	Greenock	United Kingdom	For Ministry of War Transport.
18 December	Empire Chelsea	Tudor Queen type coaster	John Lewis & Sons Ltd.	Aberdeen	United Kingdom	For Ministry of War Transport.
18 December	Empire Katy	Modified Warrior-type tug	Goole Shipbuilding & Repairing Co. Ltd.	Goole	United Kingdom	For Ministry of War Transport.
18 December	Empire Ruth	Modified Warrior-type tug	Scott & Sons Ltd.	Bowling	United Kingdom	For Ministry of War Transport.
18 December	Jagger Seam	Liberty ship	Delta Shipbuilding Company	New Orleans, Louisiana	United States	For War Shipping Administration.
18 December	Kokomo Victory	Victory ship	Bethlehem-Fairfield Shipyards	Baltimore, Maryland	United States	For War Shipping Administration.
18 December	The Yakima	T2 Tanker	Alabama Drydock and Shipbuilding Company	Mobile, Alabama	United States	For War Shipping Administration.
18 December	TID 130	TID-class tug	Richard Dunston Ltd.	Thorne	United Kingdom	For the Admiralty.
18 December	U-3027	Type XXI submarine	AG Weser	Bremen	Germany	For Kriegsmarine
19 December	Indian Island	Liberty ship	New England Shipbuilding Company	South Portland, Maine	United States	For War Shipping Administration.
19 December	Kodiak Victory	Victory ship	Oregon Shipbuilding Company	Portland, Oregon	United States	For War Shipping Administration.
19 December	Ocala Victory	Victory ship	Bethlehem-Fairfield Shipyards	Baltimore, Maryland	United States	For War Shipping Administration.
19 December	Sioux Falls Victory	Victory ship	California Shipbuilding Corporation	Los Angeles, California	United States	For War Shipping Administration.
19 December	Empire Downland	Hopper ship	Fleming & Ferguson Ltd.	Paisley	United Kingdom	For Ministry of War Transport.
19 December	U-2356	Type XXIII submarine	Deutsche Werft AG	Hamburg	Germany	For Kriegsmarine
20 December	Robert J. Banks	Liberty ship	J. A. Jones Construction Company	Brunswick, Georgia	United States	For War Shipping Administration.
20 December	Walter Frederick Kraft	Liberty ship	Todd Houston Shipbuilding Corporation	Houston, Texas	United States	For War Shipping Administration.
20 December	U-2357	Type XXIII submarine	Deutsche Werft AG	Hamburg	Germany	For Kriegsmarine
20 December	U-4702	Type XXIII submarine	Germaniawerft	Kiel	Germany	For Kriegsmarine
21 December	Hannibal Victory	Victory ship	Permanente Metals, #2 Yard	Richmond, California	United States	For War Shipping Administration.
22 December	Beecher Island	T2 Tanker	Alabama Drydock and Shipbuilding Company	Mobile, Alabama	United States	For War Shipping Administration.
22 December	Devils Lake Victory	Victory ship	Permanente Metals, #1 Yard	Richmond, California	United States	For War Shipping Administration.
22 December	Flagstaff Victory	Victory ship	California Shipbuilding Corporation	Los Angeles, California	United States	For War Shipping Administration.
22 December	Grover C. Hutcherson	Liberty ship	St. Johns River Shipbuilding Company	Jacksonville, Florida	United States	For War Shipping Administration.
22 December	La Crosse Victory	Victory ship	Bethlehem-Fairfield Shipyards	Baltimore, Maryland	United States	For War Shipping Administration.
22 December	U-3028	Type XXI submarine	AG Weser	Bremen	Germany	For Kriegsmarine
22 December	West Lynn Victory	Victory ship	Oregon Shipbuilding Company	Portland, Oregon	United States	For War Shipping Administration.
22 December	William R. Lewis	Liberty ship	Todd Houston Shipbuilding Corporation	Houston, Texas	United States	For War Shipping Administration.
22 December	William W. Seaton	Liberty ship	Southeastern Shipbuilding Corporation	Savannah, Georgia	United States	For War Shipping Administration.
22 December	U-2358	Type XXIII submarine	Deutsche Werft AG	Hamburg	Germany	For Kriegsmarine
22 December	U-2537	Type XXI submarine	Blohm + Voss	Hamburg	Germany	For Kriegsmarine
23 December	Frederick E. Williamson	Liberty ship	J. A. Jones Construction Company	Panama City, Florida	United States	For War Shipping Administration.
23 December	Nachman Syrkin	Liberty ship	Delta Shipbuilding Company	New Orleans, Louisiana	United States	For War Shipping Administration.
23 December	William F. Jerman	Liberty ship	J. A. Jones Construction Company	Brunswick, Georgia	United States	For War Shipping Administration.
23 December	U-2359	Type XXIII submarine	Deutsche Werft AG	Hamburg	Germany	For Kriegsmarine
23 December	U-3525	Type XXI submarine	Schichau-Werke	Danzig	Germany	For Kriegsmarine
23 December	U-3526	Type XXI submarine	Schichau-Werke	Danzig	Germany	For Kriegsmarine
24 December	William A. Dobson	Liberty ship	New England Shipbuilding Company	South Portland, Maine	United States	
27 December	Anadarko Victory	Victory ship	California Shipbuilding Corporation	Los Angeles, California	United States	For War Shipping Administration.
27 December	Beatrice Victory	Victory ship	Permanente Metals, #2 Yard	Richmond, California	United States	For War Shipping Administration.
27 December	Loma Victory	Victory ship	Oregon Shipbuilding Company	Portland, Oregon	United States	For War Shipping Administration.
28 December	Bela	Intermediate type tanker	Sir James Laing & Sons Ltd.	Sunderland	United Kingdom	For Anglo-Saxon Petroleum Co. Ltd.
28 December	Blue Island Victory	Victory ship	Bethlehem-Fairfield Shipyards	Baltimore, Maryland	United States	For War Shipping Administration.
28 December	Empire Abercorn	Refrigerated cargo liner	Harland & Wolff	Belfast	United Kingdom	For Ministry of War Transport.
28 December	Empire Barbados	Empire Malta-class Scandinavian type cargo ship	William Gray & Co. Ltd.	West Hartlepool	United Kingdom	For Ministry of War Transport.
28 December	Hyalina	Tanker	Swan, Hunter & Wigham Richardson Ltd.	Wallsend	United Kingdom	For Anglo-Saxon Petroleum Co. Ltd. Requisitioned by the Admiralty. Completed at RFA Olna for Royal Fleet Auxiliary.
28 December	Providence	Cleveland-class cruiser	Bethlehem Steel Company	Quincy, Massachusetts	United States	
28 December	Rendova	Commencement Bay-class escort carrier	Todd Pacific Shipyards	Tacoma, Washington	United States	
28 December	Empire Barbados	Heavy lift ship	William Gray & Co. Ltd.	West Hartlepool	United Kingdom	For Ministry of War Transport
28 December	Nuttalia	Tanker	Blythswood Shipbuilding Co. Ltd.	Glasgow	United Kingdom	For Anglo-Saxon Petroleum Co. Ltd.
18 December	TID 131	TID-class tug	Richard Dunston Ltd.	Thorne	United Kingdom	For the Admiralty Ministry of War Transport.
26 December	Empire Upland'	Hopper ship	William Simons & Co. Ltd.	Greenock	United Kingdom	For Ministry of War Transport.
28 December	U-3029	Type XXI submarine	AG Weser	Bremen	Germany	For Kriegsmarine
29 December	Carl Zachary Webb	Liberty ship	Delta Shipbuilding Company	New Orleans, Louisiana	United States	For War Shipping Administration.
29 December	Empire Takoradi	Cargo ship	William Gray & Co. Ltd.	West Hartlepool	United Kingdom	For Ministry of War Transport.
29 December	Taos Victory	Victory ship	California Shipbuilding Corporation	Los Angeles, California	United States	For War Shipping Administration.
29 December	U-2360	Type XXIII submarine	Deutsche Werft AG	Hamburg	Germany	For Kriegsmarine
30 December	Ash Hollow	T2 Tanker	Alabama Drydock and Shipbuilding Company	Mobile, Alabama	United States	For War Shipping Administration.
30 December	Empire Abercorn	Refrigerated cargo liner	Harland & Wolff Ltd.	Belfast	United Kingdom	For Ministry of War Transport.
30 December	Empire Rosa	Tug	Clelands (Successors) Ltd.	Wallsend	United Kingdom	For the Admiralty. Completed as Empire Jean.
30 December	Fred C. Stebbins	Liberty ship	St. Johns River Shipbuilding Company	Jacksonville, Florida	United States	For War Shipping Administration.
30 December	Kelso Victory	Victory ship	Oregon Shipbuilding Company	Portland, Oregon	United States	For War Shipping Administration.
30 December	LST 3009	Landing Ship, Tank	Harland & Wolff	Belfast	United Kingdom	For Royal Navy.
30 December	Mack Bruton Bryan	Liberty ship	Southeastern Shipbuilding Corporation	Savannah, Georgia	United States	For War Shipping Administration.
30 December	Potrero Hills	T2 tanker	Marinship Corporation	Sausalito, California	United States	For United States Maritime Commission.
30 December	William Asa Carter	Liberty ship	Todd Houston Shipbuilding Corporation	Houston, Texas	United States	For War Shipping Administration.
30 December	William Cox	Liberty ship	J. A. Jones Construction Company	Brunswick, Georgia	United States	For War Shipping Administration.
31 December	Virginia City Victory	Victory ship	Permanente Metals, #2 Yard	Richmond, California	United States	For War Shipping Administration.
31 December	U-3030	Type XXI submarine	AG Weser	Bremen	Germany	For Kriegsmarine
December	Empire Fathom	Empire F type coaster	Henry Scarr Ltd.	Hessle	United Kingdom	For Ministry of War Transport

== Unknown date ==
Date	Ship	Class / type	Builder	Location	Country	Notes
Unknown date	Ayakumo Maru	Tanker	Uraga Dockyard.	Uraga	Japan	For private owner.
Unknown date	Berkeley Victory	Victory ship	Permanente Metals Corporation	Richmond, California	United States	For War Shipping Administration.
Unknown date	Deike Rickmers	Hansa A type cargo ship	Deutsche Werft	Hamburg	Germany	For Rickmers Line
Unknown date	Eichberg	Cargo ship	Van der Giessen	Krimpen aan den IJssel	Netherlands	For August Bolten Wm. Miller's Nachfolger
Unknown date	Esmeralda	Cargo ship	Bremer Vulkan Schiff- und Mashinenbau.	Vegesack	Germany	For Hamburg Südamerikansche Dampfschiffarts-Gesellschaft AS & Co. KG.
Unknown date	Externsteine	Weather ship	P. Smit Jr.	Rotterdam	Netherlands	For Kriegsmarine
Unknown date	Gohren	Tanker	H. Peters.	Beidenfleth	Germany	For Kriegsmarine.
Unknown date	Hendrick Fisser V	Hansa A Type Cargo ship	Verschure & Co's Scheepswerft en Maschinenfabriek	Amsterdam	Netherlands	For Fisser & Van Doornum
Unknown date	Howacht	Coastal tanker	Greifenwerft AG,	Stettin	Germany	For Kriegsmarine.
Unknown date	Irene Oldendorff	Hansa A type Cargo ship	Burmeister & Wain	Copenhagen	Denmark	For E Oldendorff
Unknown date	Jan Mayen	Whaler	Kaldnes Mekaniske Verkstad.	Tønsberg	Norway	Requisitioned by Germany before completion.
Unknown date	Lady Duff	Motor launch	Brooke Marine Ltd.	Lowestoft	United Kingdom	For F. C. Pollard.
Unknown date	MFV-39	Naval Motor Fishing Vessel	Brooke Marine Ltd.	Lowestoft	United Kingdom	For Royal Navy.
Unknown date	MFV-102	Naval Motor Fishing Vessel	Anderson, Rigden & Perkins Ltd.	Whitstable	United Kingdom	For Royal Navy.
Unknown date	MFV-103	Naval Motor Fishing Vessel	Anderson, Rigden & Perkins Ltd.	Whitstable	United Kingdom	For Royal Navy.
Unknown date	MFV-104	Naval Motor Fishing Vessel	Anderson, Rigden & Perkins Ltd.	Whitstable	United Kingdom	For Royal Navy.
Unknown date	MFV-686	Naval Motor Fishing Vessel	J. Bolson & Son Ltd.	Poole	United Kingdom	For Royal Navy.
Unknown date	MFV-687	Naval Motor Fishing Vessel	J. Bolson & Son Ltd.	Poole	United Kingdom	For Royal Navy.
Unknown date	MFV-688	Naval Motor Fishing Vessel	J. Bolson & Son Ltd.	Poole	United Kingdom	For Royal Navy.
Unknown date	MFV-689	Naval Motor Fishing Vessel	J. Bolson & Son Ltd.	Poole	United Kingdom	For Royal Navy.
Unknown date	MFV-690	Naval Motor Fishing Vessel	J. Bolson & Son Ltd.	Poole	United Kingdom	For Royal Navy.
Unknown date	MFV-691	Naval Motor Fishing Vessel	J. Bolson & Son Ltd.	Poole	United Kingdom	For Royal Navy.
Unknown date	MFV-692	Naval Motor Fishing Vessel	J. Bolson & Son Ltd.	Poole	United Kingdom	For Royal Navy.
Unknown date	MFV-693	Naval Motor Fishing Vessel	J. Bolson & Son Ltd.	Poole	United Kingdom	For Royal Navy.
Unknown date	MFV-694	Naval Motor Fishing Vessel	J. Bolson & Son Ltd.	Poole	United Kingdom	For Royal Navy.
Unknown date	MFV-695	Naval Motor Fishing Vessel	J. Bolson & Son Ltd.	Poole	United Kingdom	For Royal Navy.
Unknown date	MFV-696	Naval Motor Fishing Vessel	J. Bolson & Son Ltd.	Poole	United Kingdom	For Royal Navy.
Unknown date	MFV-697	Naval Motor Fishing Vessel	J. Bolson & Son Ltd.	Poole	United Kingdom	For Royal Navy.
Unknown date	MFV-701	Naval Motor Fishing Vessel	J. Bolson & Son Ltd.	Poole	United Kingdom	For Royal Navy.
Unknown date	MFV-702	Naval Motor Fishing Vessel	J. Bolson & Son Ltd.	Poole	United Kingdom	For Royal Navy.
Unknown date	MFV-703	Naval Motor Fishing Vessel	J. Bolson & Son Ltd.	Poole	United Kingdom	For Royal Navy.
Unknown date	MFV-704	Naval Motor Fishing Vessel	J. Bolson & Son Ltd.	Poole	United Kingdom	For Royal Navy.
Unknown date	MFV-705	Naval Motor Fishing Vessel	J. Bolson & Son Ltd.	Poole	United Kingdom	For Royal Navy.
Unknown date	MFV-706	Naval Motor Fishing Vessel	J. Bolson & Son Ltd.	Poole	United Kingdom	For Royal Navy.
Unknown date	MOWT 30	Floating crane	Barry Graving Dock & Engineering Company	Barry	United Kingdom	For Ministry of War Transport.
Unknown date	MOWT 31	Floating crane	Barry Graving Dock & Engineering Company	Barry	United Kingdom	For Ministry of War Transport.
Unknown date	MTB 494	Motor Torpedo Boat	British Power Boat Company	Hythe	United Kingdom	For Royal Navy.
Unknown date	Pagenturm	Hansa A type cargo ship	Flensburge Schiff- Gesellschaft.	Flensburg	Germany	For Hansa Line.
Unknown date	Peter Rickmers	Hansa A Type cargo ship	Lübecker Maschinenbau-Gesellschaft	Lübeck	Germany	For Rickmers Line
Unknown date	Poseidon	Tanker	Nordseewerke.	Emden	Germany	For private owner.
Unknown date	Robert Bornhofen	Cargo ship	Nakskov Skibs Akt.	Nakskov	Denmark	For Robert Bornhofen. Requisitioned by the Kriegsmarine on completion.
Unknown date	Rodenbek	Hansa A Type cargo ship	Flensburger Schiffbau-Gesellschaft	Flensburg	Germany	For Knohr & Burchard
Unknown date	Sanga	Hansa A Type cargo ship	Lübecker Flenderwerke AG	Lübeck	Germany	For Deutsche-Afrika Linie
Unknown date	Setubal	Hansa A type cargo ship	Lübecker Flenderwerke AG	Lübeck	Germany	For Oldenburg Portugiesische Dampschiffs Rhederei
Unknown date	St. Bees	Concrete barge	W. & C. French Ltd.	Grays Thurrock	United Kingdom	For F. T. Everard & Sons Ltd.
Unknown date	Steingrund	Tanker	Wilton-Fijenoord NV.	Schiedam	Netherlands	For Kriegsmarine.
Unknown date	St. Mawes	Concrete barge	W. & C. French Ltd.	Grays Thurrock	United Kingdom	For F. T. Everard & Sons Ltd.
Unknown date	St. Michael	Concrete barge	W. & C. French Ltd.	Grays Thurrock	United Kingdom	For F. T. Everard & Sons Ltd.
Unknown date	VIC 29	VIC lighter	Isaac Pimblott & Sons Ltd.	Northwich	United Kingdom	For the Admiralty.
Unknown date	VIC 30	VIC lighter	Isaac Pimblott & Sons Ltd.	Northwich	United Kingdom	For the Admiralty.
Unknown date	VIC 72	VIC lighter	Brown's Shipbuilding & Dry Dock Co. Ltd.	Hull	United Kingdom	For the Admiralty.
Unknown date	VIC 73	VIC lighter	Brown's Shipbuilding & Dry Dock Co. Ltd.	Hull	United Kingdom	For the Admiralty.
Unknown date	Weserbrück	Hansa A type Cargo ship	Deutsche Werft	Hamburg	Germany	For Norddeutscher Lloyd
Unknown date	Weserwehr	Cargo ship	Deutsche Werft.	Hamburg	Germany	For Norddeutscher Lloyd.
Unknown date	X 20	X-class submarine	Thomas Broadbent & Son Ltd.	Huddersfield		For Royal Navy.
Unknown date	X 21	X-class submarine	Thomas Broadbent & Son Ltd.	Huddersfield		For Royal Navy.
Unknown date	XE 1	XE-class submarine	Thomas Broadbent & Son Ltd.	Huddersfield		For Royal Navy.
Unknown date	XE 2	XE-class submarine	Thomas Broadbent & Son Ltd.	Huddersfield		For Royal Navy.
Unknown date	XE 3	XE-class submarine	Thomas Broadbent & Son Ltd.	Huddersfield		For Royal Navy.
Unknown date	XE 4	XE-class submarine	Thomas Broadbent & Son Ltd.	Huddersfield		For Royal Navy.
Unknown date	XE 5	XE-class submarine	Thomas Broadbent & Son Ltd.	Huddersfield		For Royal Navy.
Unknown date	XE 6	XE-class submarine	Thomas Broadbent & Son Ltd.	Huddersfield		For Royal Navy.
Unknown date	XE 7	XE-class submarine	Thomas Broadbent & Son Ltd.	Huddersfield		For Royal Navy.
Unknown date	XE 8	XE-class submarine	Thomas Broadbent & Son Ltd.	Huddersfield		For Royal Navy.
Unknown date	Unnamed	VIC lighter	J. Hay & Sons Ltd.	Kirkintilloch		Completed as Kaffir for J. Hay & Sons Ltd.

== Sources ==
- Friedman, Norman (2008). British Destroyers and Frigates: The Second World War and After. Barnsley, UK: Seaforth Publishing. ISBN 978-1-84832-015-4.
- Mitchell, WH; Sawyer, LA (1990). The Empire Ships (Second ed.). London, New York, Hamburg, Hong Kong: Lloyd's of London Press Ltd. ISBN 1-85044-275-4.
