= List of Liberty ships (S–Samtyne) =

This is a List of Liberty ships with names beginning with S to Samtyne.

== Description ==
The standard Liberty ship (EC-2-S-C1 type) was a cargo ship 441 feet 6 inches (134.57 m) long overall, with a beam of 56 feet 10 3/4 inches (17.34 m). It had a depth of 37 feet 4 inches (11.38 m) and a draft of 26 feet 10 inches (8.18 m). It was powered by a triple expansion steam engine, which had cylinders of 24 1/2 inches (62 cm), 37 inches (94 cm) and 70 inches (180 cm) diameter by 48 inches (120 cm) stroke. The engine produced 2,500ihp at 76rpm. Driving a four-blade propeller 18 feet 6 inches (5.64 m) in diameter, could propel the ship at 11 knots (20 km/h).

The Cargo was carried in five holds, numbered 1–5 from bow to stern. Grain capacity was 84,183 cubic feet (2,383.8 m^{3}), 145,604 cubic feet (4,123.0 m^{3}), 96,429 cubic feet (2,730.6 m^{3}), 93,190 cubic feet (2,639 m^{3}) and 93,190 cubic feet (2,639 m^{3}), with a further 49,086 cubic feet (1,390.0 m^{3}) in the deep tanks. Bale capacity was 75,405 cubic feet (2,135.2 m^{3}), 134,638 cubic feet (3,812.5 m^{3}), 83,697 cubic feet (2,370.0 m^{3}), 82,263 cubic feet (2,329.4 m^{3}) and 82,435 cubic feet (2,334.3 m^{3}), with a further 41,135 cubic feet (1,164.8 m^{3}) in the deep tanks.

It carried a crew of 45, plus 36 United States Navy Armed Guard gunners. Later in the war, this was altered to a crew of 52, plus 29 gunners. Accommodation was in a three deck superstructure placed midships. The galley was equipped with a range, a 25 US gallons (95 L) stock kettle and other appliances. Messrooms were equipped with an electric hot plate and an electric toaster.

== Sabik ==
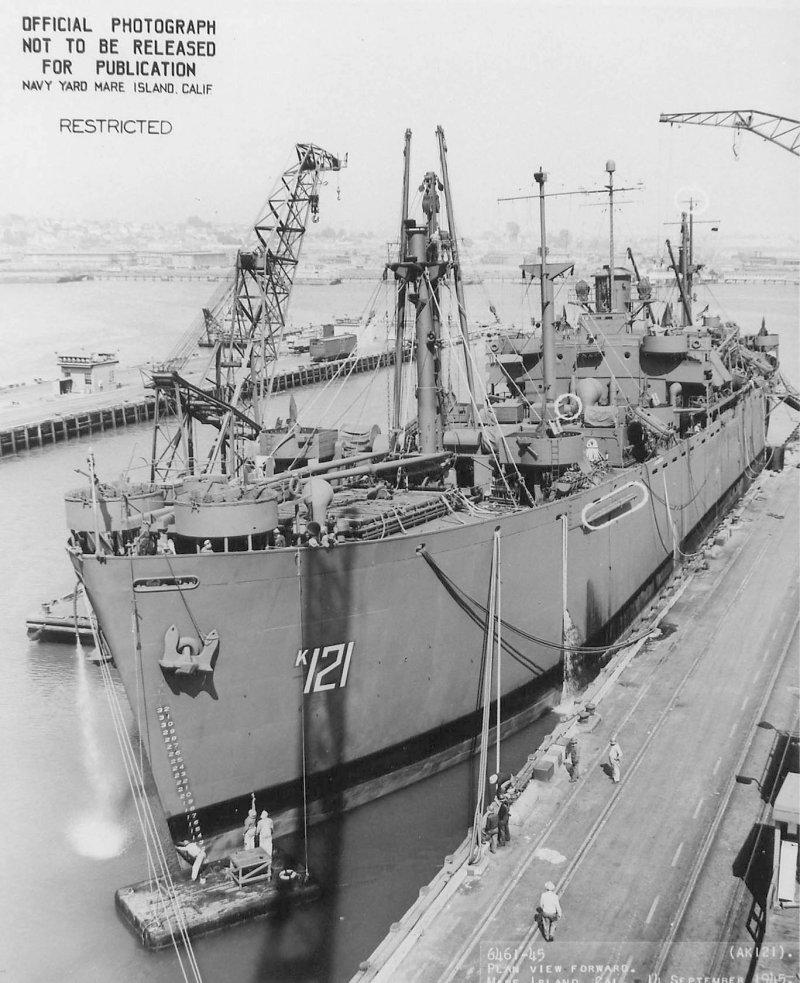
USS Sabik

Sabik was built by Todd Houston Shipbuilding Corporation, Houston, Texas. Her keel was laid as William Becknell on 8 November 1943. She was launched as Sabik on 17 December and delivered on 29 December. Converted for naval use by Todd Johnson Drydocks, New Orleans, Louisiana. To the War Shipping Administration (WSA) in March 1946 and renamed William Becknell. Laid up in Suisun Bay. She was scrapped at Oakland, California in March 1961.

== Sacajawea ==
Sacajawea was built by Oregon Shipbuilding Corporation, Portland, Oregon. Her keel was laid on 28 November 1942. She was launched on 22 December and delivered on 29 December. She was scrapped at Seattle, Washington in May 1961.

== Sallie S. Cotten ==
Sallie S. Cotten was built by North Carolina Shipbuilding Company, Wilmington, North Carolina. Her keel was laid on 13 April 1943. She was launched on 7 May and delivered on 14 May. To the Norwegian Government under charter and renamed Ole Bull. Sold in 1947 to A/S Smedvigs Tankrederi, Stavanger, Norway. Operated under the management of Peder Smedvig. Sold in 1959 to Compania Pacifica S.A. Monrovia, Liberia and renamed South River. Management transferred to Spa Industria Armamente in 1962. Sold in 1965 to Kronos Shipping Ltd., Monrovia and renamed Kronos. Operated under the management of Dynamic Shipping Inc. Management transferred to Crystal Maritim Agency Inc. in 1966. She was sold in March 1967 to Kanbara Kisen K.K., Tsuneishi, Japan for breaking. She arrived at Tsuneishi on 24 March 1967.

== Salmon P. Chase ==
Salmon P. Chase was built by Oregon Shipbuilding Corporation. Her keel was laid on 3 September 1942. She was launched on 2 October and delivered on 13 October. She was scrapped at Beaumont, Texas in August 1960.

== Salvador Brau ==
Salvador Brau was built by J. A. Jones Construction Co, Panama City, Florida. Her keel was laid on 8 November 1943. She was launched on 15 December and delivered on 31 January 1944. She was scrapped at New Orleans in March 1967.

== Samadang ==
Samadang was built by New England Shipbuilding Corporation, South Portland, Maine. Her keel was laid on 13 March 1944. She was launched on 22 April and delivered on 30 April. To the Ministry of War Transport (MoWT) under Lend-Lease. Operated under the management of J. Robinson & Sons. To the United States Maritime Commission (USMC) in 1948, laid up at Beaumont. She was scrapped at New Orleans in September 1968.

== Samadre ==
Samadre was built by New England Shipbuilding Corporation. Her keel was laid on 18 February 1944. She was launched on 4 April and delivered on 15 April. To the MoWT under Lend-Lease. Operated under the management of Hain Steamship Co. Sold in 1947 to Larrinaga Steamship Co., Liverpool, United Kingdom and renamed Maria de Larrinaga. Requisitioned by the Ministry of Transport (MoT) in 1956 for use as a store ship during the Suez Crisis. Sold in 1964 to Marsegoro Compania Navigation, Panama and renamed Meletios. Reflagged to Greece and operated under the management of Pegasus Ocean Services. She was scrapped at Sakaide, Japan in July 1967.

== Samaffric ==
Samaffric was built by Bethlehem Fairfield Shipyard, Baltimore, Maryland. Her keel was laid on 24 January 1944. She was launched on 24 February and delivered on 8 March. To the MoWT under Lend-Lease, operated under the management of William Thompson & Co. Sold in 1947 to Ben Line and renamed Benvrackie, remaining under the management of William Thompson & Co. Sold in 1952 to Nettuna Società di Siciliana di Navigazione per Azioni, Palermo, Sicily, Italy and renamed Citta di Salerno. Sold in 1953 to d'Amico Società di Navigazione. Sold in 1964 to Trafalgar Steamship Co. and renamed Newforest. Reflagged to the United Kingdom and operated under the management of Tsavliris Ltd. Sold in 1965 to Panamic Shipping Co., Panama. Reflagged to Haiti, remaining under the same management. Sold in 1966 to Kantara Shipping Co. Reflagged to Cyprus, remaining under the same management. She was scrapped at Split, Yugoslavia in August 1970.

== Samakron ==
Samakron was built by New England Shipbuilding Corporation. Her keel was laid on 13 September 1943. She was launched as Jeremiah L. Chaplin on 31 October and delivered as Samakron on 9 November. To the MoWT under Lend-Lease. Operated under the management of Royal Mail Lines. Returned to the USMC in 1947 and officially renamed Jeremiah L. Chaplin. Laid up in the James River as Samakron. She was scrapped in Baltimore in 1959.

== Samalness ==
Samalness was built by J. A. Jones Construction Co., Brunswick, Georgia. Her keel was laid on 15 January 1944. She was launched on 29 February and delivered on 11 March. To the MoWT under Lend-Lease. Operated under the management of Royal Mail Lines. Sold in 1947 to Maritime Shipping & Trading Co. and renamed Castledore. Operated under the management of Michalinos & Co. She lost her propeller on 27 January 1951 whilst on a voyage from Hull, United Kingdom to Torrevieja, Spain and was abandoned after her cargo shifted. Her crew were rescued by a French trawler. She came ashore on the Spanish coast near A Coruña (43°44′N 7°31′W) and sank.

== Samana ==
Samana was built by Permanente Metals Corporation, Richmond, California. Her keel was laid on 6 July 1943. She was launched as William F. Vilas on 31 July and completed as Samana on 12 August. To the MoWT under Lend-Lease. Operated under the management of Lamport & Holt Line. To USMC in 1947 and renamed William F. Vilas. Laid up in the James River as Samana. She was scrapped at Philadelphia, Pennsylvania in October 1949.

== Samannan ==
Samannan was built by New England Shipbuilding Corporation. Her keel was laid on 13 December 1943. She was launched on 31 January 1944 and delivered on 14 February. To the MoWT under Lend-Lease. Operated under the management of Blue Star Line, London. Sold to her managers in 1947 and renamed Oregon Star. Sold in 1951 to Lamport & Holt Line. Renamed Laplace in 1952. Sold in 1953 to San Panteleimon Compania de Navigation, Panama and renamed Panteleimon. Reflagged to Costa Rica and operated under the management of Pateras Ltd. Reflagged to Cyprus in 1959. She was driven ashore and severely damaged at Kobe, Japan on 27 March 1967. She was scrapped at Yokosuka, Japan in May 1967.

== Samar ==
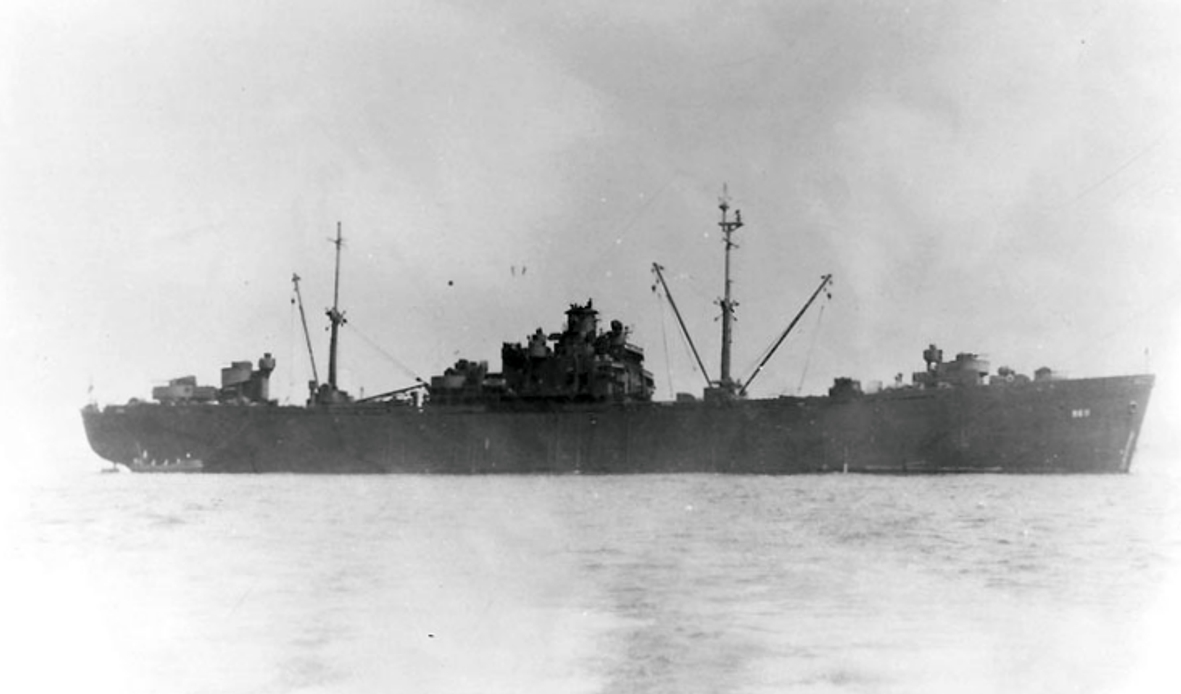
USS Samar

Samar was built by Bethlehem Fairfield Shipyard. Her keel was laid on 21 September 1944. She was launched on 19 October and delivered on 31 October. To the United States Navy. Converted for naval use by Bethlehem Steel, Baltimore. Laid up in reserve at San Diego, California in 1947. Moved to Suisun Bay in September 1962. Sold to shipbreakers in Portland, Oregon in December 1973. Resold, she arrived at Kaohsiung, Taiwan for scrapping in February 1974.

== Samara ==
Samara was built by Bethlehem Fairfield Shipyard. Her keel was laid on 28 July 1943. She was launched as Emma Lazarus on 22 August and delivered as Samara on 30 August. To the MoWT under Lend-Lease, operated under the management of Bucknall Steamship Co. Renamed Samshire in 1943. Sold in 1947 to Ellerman Lines Ltd. and renamed City of Doncaster. Remaining under the same management. Management transferred to City Line Ltd. in 1951. Sold in 1961 to Trader Line Ltd., Bermuda and renamed Pembroke Trader. Remaining under the British flag and operated under the management of Moller Line Ltd. Sold in 1966 to Doreen Steamship Corp., Panama and renamed Galletta. Reflagged to Liberia and operated under the management of Fuji Marden & Co. Ran aground 60 nautical miles (110 km) off Chalna, East Pakistan (21°48′N 94°00′E) on10 April 1970 whilst on a voyage from Chittagong to Chalna. Refloated on 21 May and towed in to Chalna. Scrapped in Hong Kong in August 1970.

== Samarina ==
Samarina was built by Bethlehem Fairfield Shipyard. Her keel was laid on 28 July 1943. She was launched as James Blair on 26 August and delivered as Samarina on 3 September. To the MoWT under Lend-Lease. Operated under the management of Westcott & Laurence Line. Sold in 1947 to Ellerman Lines Ltd., London and renamed City of Ely. Operated under the management of Ellerman & Bucknall Steamship Co. She collided with the Philippine cargo ship Susana in the Suez Canal on 7 January 1960. Both ships were damaged. Sold in 1961 to Trader Line Ltd., Bermuda and renamed Paget Trader. Remaining under the British flag and operated under the management of Moller Line Ltd. She caught fire in the Indian Ocean (5°45′N 94°00′E) on 2 November 1965. She put in to Singapore on 6 November. Subsequently, laid up at Hong Kong. She was scrapped at Kaohsiung in August 1966.

== Samarinda ==
Samarinda was built by California Shipbuilding Corporation, Terminal Island, Los Angeles, California. Her keel was laid on 9 August 1943. She was launched as Samson Occum on 31 August and delivered as Samarinda on 17 September. To the MoWT under Lend-Lease. Operated under the management of T. & J. Harrison. Sold in 1947 to Charente Steamship Co., Liverpool and renamed Student. Remaining under the management of T. & J. Harrison. Sold in 1963 to Parthenon Shipping Corp. and renamed Parthenon. Reflagged to Liberia and operated under the management of Transmarine Shipping Agencies. Sold in 1964 to Michael A. Araktingi and renamed Al Amin. Reflagged to Lebanon and operated under the management of Midsutra Shipping Ltd. Sold in 1966 to Iona Shipping Co., Panama and renamed Fortune Sea. Reflagged to Panama and operated under the management of South East Asia Shipping & Trading Co. She was scrapped at Kaohsiung in April 1967.

== Samaritan ==
Samaritan was built by California Shipbuilding Corporation. Her keel was laid on 15 June 1943. She was launched as Granville Stuart on 11 July and delivered as Samaritan on 23 July. To the MoWT under Lend-Lease. Operated under the management of Cunard White Star Line Ltd. Sold to her managers in 1947 and renamed Vandalia. Sold in 1954 to Marine Transport Co., Panama and renamed Sideris. Operated under the management of Rethymnis & Kulukundis. Management transferred to Margaronis Navigation Agency in 1956. Sold in 1969 to Transmarine Carriers Corp. Reflagged to Liberia, remaining under the same management. She was scrapped at Barcelona, Spain in July 1971.

== Samariz ==
Samariz was built by Bethlehem Fairfield Shipyard. Her keel was laid on 28 August 1943. She was launched as John J. McGraw on 22 September and delivered as Samariz on 1 October. To the MoWT and renamed John J. McGraw. Operated under the management of Lamport & Holt Line. Sold to her managers in 1947 and renamed Lassell. Sold in 1962 to Poseidon Compania Navigation, Panama and renamed Aiolos II. Operated under the management of Transmarine Shipping Agency. She ran aground off Cloughey, United Kingdom on 9 August 1952. Sold in 1967 to Falcon Shipping Co. and reflagged to Cyprus, remaining under the same management. She was scrapped at Shanghai, China in December 1968.

== Samark ==
Samark was built by Permanente Metals Corporation. Her keel was laid on 6 September 1943. She was launched as John G. North on 30 September and delivered as Samark on 8 October. To the MoWT under Lend-Lease. Operated under the management of Ellerman's Wilson Line. Returned to the USMC in 1947 and renamed John G. North. Laid up in the James River. She was scrapped at Philadelphia in 1960.

== Samarkand ==
Samarkand was built by Bethlehem Fairfield Shipyard. Her keel was laid on 24 July 1943. She was launched as Peter Cooper on 25 August and delivered as Samarkand on 5 September. To the MoWT under Lend-Lease. Operated under the management of Alfred Holt & Co. Sold in 1947 to Ocean Steamship Co., Liverpool and renamed Talthybias, remaining under the same management. Sold in 1954 to Glen Line Ltd. and renamed Gleniffer. In 1956, she was requisitioned by the MoT for use as a storeship during the Suez Crisis. Sold in 1958 to Columbine Shipping Co. and renamed Dove. Reflagged to Liberia and operated under the management of S.A.G.E.D. Sold in 1965 to Partiarch Steamship Co., New York and renamed Patraic Sky., remaining under the Liberian flag. She was scrapped at Split in April 1971.

== Samarovsk ==
Samarovsk was built by California Shipbuilding Corporation. Her keel was laid on 15 July 1943. She was launched as Henry M. Robinson on 8 August and delivered as Samarovsk on 21 August. To the MoWT under Lend-Lease, operated under the management of Lamport & Holt Line. Returned to the USM in 1947 and laid up in the James River. She was scrapped at Panama City, Florida in December 1961.

== Samaustral ==
Samaustral was built by J. A. Jones Construction Company, Brunswick. Her keel was laid on 16 March 1944. She was launched on 28 April and delivered on 13 May. To the MoWT under Lend-Lease. Operated under the management of J. & C. Harrison Ltd., London. Sold to her managers in 1947 and renamed Harpathian. Sold in 1956 to Società di Navigazione Tito Campanella, Genoa, Italy and renamed Suncampanella. Sold in 1963 to A. Marpotente Compania Navigation, Panama and renamed Calipoi A.. Reflagged to Liberia and operated under the management of Angelos Ltd. Sold in 1966 to Seawave Shipping Co. and renamed Marach. She was scrapped at Bilbao, Spain in August 1971.

== Samavon ==
Samavon was built by New England Shipbuilding Corporation. Her keel was laid on 8 November 1943. She was launched on 18 December and delivered as Samavon on 30 December. To MoWT under Lend-Lease, operated under the management of Prince Line. Sold in 1947 to Furness, Withy & Co., London and renamed Pacific Nomad. Sold in 1954 to Panama Steamship Co., Panama and renamed Nikolos. Reflagged to Liberia and placed under the management of S. G. Embiricos. Sold in 1960 to Diana Maritime Corp. and renamed Stamatis. Reflagged to Liberia and placed under the management of Frinton Shipbrokers Ltd. Management transferred to Pegasus Ocean Services Ltd. in 1964. Ran aground 4 nautical miles (7.4 km) south of Madras, India in a typhoon on 3 November 1966 whilst on a voyage from Madras to Calcutta. Wrecked in another typhoon on 10 November. Declared a total loss.

== Samaye ==
Samaye was built by Bethlehem Fairfield Shipyard. Her keel was laid on 3 August 1943. She was launched at James T. Earle on 31 August and delivered as Samaye on 8 September. To the MoWT under Lend-Lease. Operated under the management of Cayzer, Irvine & Co. Management transferred to Thomas Dunlop & Sons in 1946. Sold in 1947 to Queen Line & Cadogan Steamship Co. Ltd. and renamed Queen Victoria, remaining under the same management. Sold in 1948 to Charente Steamship Co. and renamed Historian. Operated under the management of T. & J. Harrison. Sold in 1962 to Jayanti Shipping Co., London and Bombay, India and renamed Parvati Jayanti. Reflagged to India. Damaged by Israeli shellfire at Suez, Egypt on 6 September 1967. Subsequently repaired. She ran aground at Azemmour, Morocco on 22 February 1968 whilst on a voyage from Alexandria, Egypt to Bombay. She was refloated the next day and taken in to Casablanca, Morocco in a severely damaged condition. She was scrapped at Avilés, Spain in April 1968.

== Sambalt ==
Sambalt was built by Bethlehem Fairfield Shipyard. Her keel was laid on 18 November 1943. She was launched as Robert Wickliffe on 9 December and delivered as Sambalt on 18 December. To MoWT under Lend-Lease. Operated under the management of Cayzer, Irvine & Co. Management transferred to David Alexander & Sons in 1946. Sold in 1947 to Moller Line Ltd., London and renamed Lilian Moller. Sold in 1948 to Charente Steamship Co., London and renamed Speaker. Operated under the management of T. & J. Harrison. Sold in 1962 to Epos Marine Enterprises, Panama and renamed Byzantion. Reflagged to Greece and operated under the management of A. Luisi Ltd. Management transferred to J. C. Carras & Sons in 1965. She was scrapped at Onomichi, Japan in May 1969.

== Sambanka ==
Sambanka was built by New England Shipbuilding Corporation. Her keel was laid on 28 February 1944. She was launched on 11 April 1944 and delivered on 22 April. To the MoWT under Lend-Lease. Operated under the management of H. Hogarth & Sons. To the USMC in 1947 and laid up in the James River. She was scrapped at Philadelphia in 1967.

== Sambay ==
Sambay was built by Oregon Shipbuilding Corporation. Her keel was laid on 9 July 1943. She was launched on 29 July and delivered as Sambay on 5 August. To the MoWT, operated under the management of Glen Line Ltd. Sold in 1947 to T. & J. Harrison, Liverpool and renamed Senator. Requisitioned in 1956 by the MoT during the Suez Crisis. Sold in 1964 to Bienventos Compania Navigation SA, Panama and renamed Ajax. She was scrapped at Kaohsiung in May 1968.

== Samblade ==
Samblade was built by California Shipbuilding Corporation. Her keel was laid on 30 June 1943. She was launched on 24 July and delivered as Samblade on 8 August. To the MoWT, operated under the management of Port Line Ltd. To USMC in 1948, renamed Augustus H. Garland and laid up in the James River. She was scrapped at Baltimore in October 1959.

== Sambo ==
Sambo was built by California Shipbuilding Corporation. Her keel was laid on 8 July 1943. She was launched at Edwin Joseph O'Hara on 29 July and delivered as Samboon 12 August. Built for the MoWT, she was operated under the management of Cunard White Star Line. She was torpedoed and sunk in the Gulf of Aden (12°28′N 43°31′E) by I-27 on 10 November 1943 whilst on a voyage from Iquique, Chile to Suez.

== Samboston ==
Samboston was built by Bethlehem Fairfield Shipyard. Her keel was laid on 1 November 1943. She was launched as Willis J. Abbot on 26 November and delivered as Samboston on 6 December. To the MoWT, operated under the management of Ellerman & Papayanni Lines. Sold in 1947 to Ellerman Lines Ltd. and renamed City of Rochester. Operated under the management of Ellerman & Bucknall Steamship Co. Management transferred to Hall Line Ltd. in 1951. Sold in 1962 to Sirikari Compania Navigation, Panama and renamed Fotini Xilas. Reflagged to Greece and operated under the management of Fred Hunter. Sold in 1964 to Cardinal Shipping Corp. and renamed Resolute II. Reflagged to Liberia and operated under the management of Maritime Associates. She was scrapped at Taipei, Taiwan in 1968.

== Sambrake ==
Sambrake was built by Bethlehem Fairfield Shipyard. Her keel was laid on 16 July 1943. She was launched as Lionel Copley on 12 August and delivered as Sambrake on 20 August. To the MoWT under Lend-Lease. Operated under the management of Ellerman & Bucknall Steamship Co. Ltd. Sold in 1947 to Ellerman Lines Ltd. and renamed City of Chelmsford, remaining under the same management. Sold in 1959 to Compania Navigation Vaptistis, Panama and renamed San George. Reflagged to Greece and operated under the management of Lemos & Pateras. Converted to a motor vessel at Newport, United Kingdom in 1960. Two Mirrlees, Bickerton & Day diesel engines fitted. Reflagged to Lebanon in 1961. Management transferred to Lemos & Co. in 1963. Sold in 1968 to Suerte Shipping Co. and renamed Suerte. Reflagged to Cyprus and operated under the management of Papadimitiou. She was scrapped at Split in March 1972.

== Sambre ==
Sambre was built by Permanente Metals Corporation. Her keel was laid on 6 July 1943. She was launched as George Inness on 28 July and delivered as Sambre on 9 August. To the United Kingdom under Lend-Lease. Built for the MoWT, she was operated under the management of Cunard White Star Line Ltd. Returned to USMC in 1947 and renamed George Inness. Laid up in the James River. She was scrapped at Baltimore in April 1961.

== Sambrian ==
Sambrian was built by North Carolina Shipbuilding Company, Wilmington, North Carolina. Her keel was laid on 25 July 1943. She was launched as John Branch on 21 August and delivered as Sambrian on 27 August. To the MoWT under Lend-Lease. Operated under the management of Cayzer, Irvine & Co. She lost her propeller on 31 August 1946 when departing Port Said, Egypt for Naples, Italy. She was towed in to Alexandria, Egypt on 4 September by the Liberty ship Saminver. A replacement propeller was obtained from the wreck of the Liberty ship Thomas G. Masaryk and fitted by flooding her forward holds, avoiding the need for a drydock. Management transferred to Frank C. Strick & Co. in 1947. Sold later that year to Clan Line Steamers Ltd. and renamed Clan Macfarlane. Operated under the management of Cayzer, Irvine & Co. Sold in 1961 to Vesta Marine Corp. and renamed Nicholas. Reflagged to Lebanon and operated under the management of Frinton Shipbrokers. Ran aground in a typhoon at Hachinoe, Japan on 10 October 1961 whilst on a voyage from Kamaishi, Japan to Vancouver. She was refloated on 27 October and towed in to Hachinoe. Declared a constructive total loss, she was scrapped at Yokosuka in 1962.

== Sambridge ==
Sambridge was built by Permanente Metals Corporation. Her keel was laid on 17 June 1943. She was launched as John E. Wilkie on 8 July and delivered as Sambridge on 20 July. Built for the MoWT, she was operated under the management of T. & J. Brocklebank Ltd. Torpedoed and sunk in the Arabian Sea (11°25′N 47°25′E) by I-27 on 18 November 1943 whilst on a voyage from Madras, India to an American port.

== Sambuff ==
Sambuff was built by Bethlehem Fairfield Shipyard. Her keel was laid on 15 October 1943. She was launched as Frank A. Vanderlip on 13 November and delivered as Sambuff on 20 November. To the MoWT, operated under the management of Union-Castle Steamship Co. Renamed Frank A. Vanderlip in 1944. To the USMC in 1948. Laid up at Wilmington, North Carolina. She was scrapped at Kearny, New Jersey in May 1967.

== Sambur ==
Sambur was built by California Shipbuilding Corporation. Her keel was laid on 5 August 1943. She was launched as Dwight B. Heard on 28 August and delivered as Sambur on 14 September. To MoWT under Lend-Lease, operated under the management of Ellerman's Wilson Line. Renamed Samwharfe in 1944. To USMC on 1947 and renamed Dwight B. Heard. Laid up in the James River post-war. She was scrapped at Philadelphia in 1960.

== Samburgh ==
Samburgh was built by Bethlehem Fairfield Shipyard. Her keel was laid on 17 October 1943. She was launched as Jacob H. Schiff on 14 November and delivered as Samburgh on 22 November. To the MoWT under Lend-Lease, she was operated under the management of Andrew Weir & Co. Sold in 1947 to Bank Line and renamed Tielbank, remaining under her previous managers. Sold in 1960 to Febo Amedeo Bertorella Società, Genoa and renamed Giacomo. She was driven from her moorings in the Elbe on 16 February 1962 and collided with the Soviet cargo ship Enesei, which also broke from her moorings. Sold in 1962 to Seatide Shipping Corp., Lugano, Switzerland and renamed Sorrelhorse. Reflagged to Liberia. Reflagged to Panama in 1966. She was scrapped at Split in April 1969.

== Sambut ==
Sambut was built by Oregon Shipbuilding Corporation. Her keel was laid on 26 July 1943. She was launched as C. J. Jones on 14 August, and delivered as Sambut on 21 August. Built for the MoWT, she was operated under the management of P. Henderson & Co. She was shelled and sunk in the Strait of Dover (51°08′N 1°35′E) by shore-based artillery on 6 June 1944 whilst on a voyage from the River Thames to Normandy, France.

== Samcalia ==
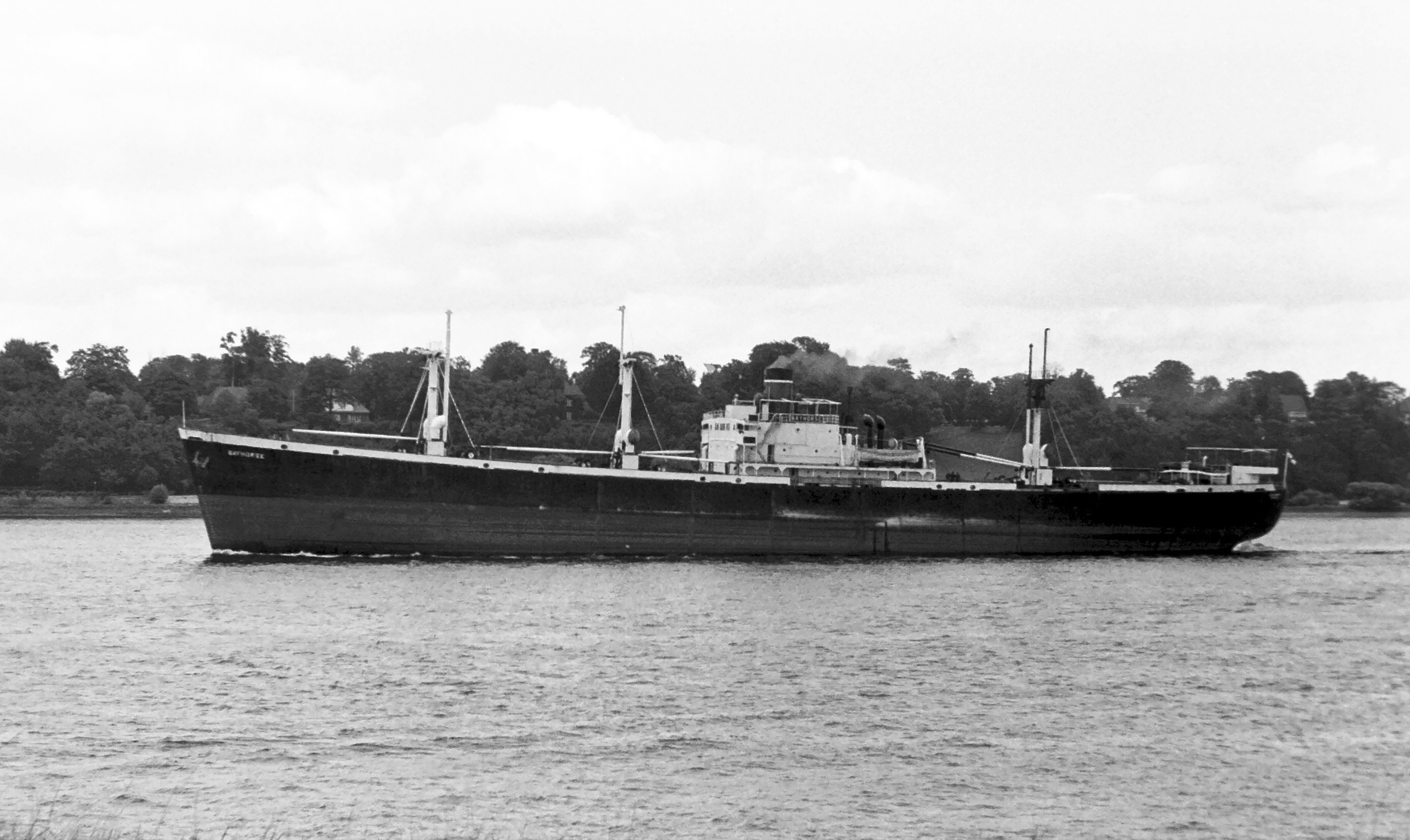
Bayhorse

Samcalia was built by California Shipbuilding Corporation. Her keel was laid on 18 August 1943. She was launched as Lorrin A. Thurston on 10 September and delivered as Samcalia on 23 September. To the MoWT under Lend-Lease. Operated under the management of Furness, Withy & Co., London. Sold to her managers in 1947 and renamed Pacific Liberty. Sold in 1954 to Febo Amedeo Bertorello Societá, Genoa and renamed Phoebus. Sold in 1962 to Seatide Shipping Co., Lugano and renamed Bayhorse. Reflagged to Liberia. Reflagged to Panama in 1966. Sold in 1970 to Compania di Navigazione Houston, Lugano and renamed San Gabriel, remaining under the Panamanian flag. She was scrapped at Split in March 1970.

== Samcebu ==
Samcebu was built by Southeastern Shipbuilding Corporation, Savannah, Georgia. Her keel was laid on 4 March 1944. She was launched on 23 April and delivered on 10 May. Built for the MoWT, she was operated under the management of Bolton Steam Shipping Co., London. Sold to her managers in 1947 and renamed Reynolds. Sold in 1951 to Parana Compania de Vapores, Panama and renamed St. Nicolas. Reflagged to Costa Rica and operated under the management of Lyras Bros. Sold in 1956 to San Ignacio Compania Navigation, Panama and renamed Panagos, remaining under the same flag and management. Sold in 1959 to Amazon Shipping Co., Panama and renamed Amazon. Reflagged to Greece and operated under the management of Faros Shipping Co. She ran aground near Cape Bon, Tunisia (36°43′N 10°58′E) on 24 December 1963 whilst on a voyage from Venice, Italy to Buenos Aires, Argentina. She was refloated on 8 January 1964. Declared a constructive total loss, she was scrapped at La Spezia, Italy in March 1964.

== Samchess ==
Samchess was built by Bethlehem Fairfield Shipyard. Her keel was laid on 19 December 1943. She was launched on 20 January 1944 and delivered on 29 January. To the MoWT under Lend-Lease. Operated under the management of Cayzer, Irvine & Co. Management transferred to R. S. Dalgleish Ltd in 1946. Sold in 1947 to Alpha South African Steamship Co. and renamed Alpha Mooi. Operated under the management of Moller Line. Sold in 1948 to Somerset Steamship Co. and renamed Porlock Hill. Operated under the management of Counties Ship Management Ltd. She was driven ashore 2 nautical miles (3.7 km) east of Famagusta, Cyprus on 22 December 1951 whilst on a voyage from Southampton, United Kingdom to Port Said, Egypt. She broke in two and was a total loss. The stern section was refloated on 29 March 1952. It was towed to Alexandria on 29 April, then towed to Palermo on 14 May and subsequently scrapped.

== Samcleve ==
Samcleve was built by Bethlehem Fairfield Shipyard. Her keel was laid on 17 October 1943. She was launched at John T. Clark on 15 November and delivered as Samcleve on 23 November. To the MoWT under Lend-Lease. Operated under the management of A. Holt & Co. Sold in 1947 to Ocean Steamship Co. and renamed Tantalus. Remained under the same management. Sold in 1958 to Ditta Luigi Pittaluga Vapori, Genoa and renamed Urbania. Sold in 1965 to Henry Coe & Clerici, Genoa and renamed Cocler. She was scrapped at Vado Ligure, Italy in January 1975.

== Samclyde ==
Samclyde was built by Bethlehem Fairfield Shipyard. Her keel was laid on 4 December 1943. She was launched on 24 December and delivered on 10 January 1944. To the MoWT under Lend-Lease. Operated under the management of Andrew Weir & Co. She struck a mine in the Aegean Sea (40°22′N 22°51′E) on 30 April 1945 and was severely damaged. To the WSA in 1946 and laid up in the James River. She was scrapped at Philadelphia in March 1966.

== Samcolne ==
Samcolne was built by Bethlehem Fairfield Shipyard. Her keel was laid on 5 February 1944. She was launched on 4 March and delivered on 16 March. To the MoWT under Lend-Lease. Operated under the management of Anchor Line Ltd. Sold in 1947 to Moller Line Ltd., London and renamed Mary Moller. Sold in 1948 to Charente Steamship Co. and renamed Sculptor. Operated under the management of T. & J. Harrison. Sold in 1962 to Galaro Compania Navigation, Panama and renamed Cape Venetico. Reflagged to Greece and operated under the management of A. Luisi Ltd. Management transferred to J. C. Carras & Son in 1965. She was scrapped at Hong Kong in December 1967.

== Samconon ==
Samconon was built by Bethlehem Fairfield Shipyard. Her keel was laid on 25 January 1944. She was launched on 21 February and delivered on 29 February. To the MoWT under Lend-Lease. Operated under the management of B. & S. Shipping Co. To the USMC in 1947. Sold in 1948 to Honduras Shipping Co., Tegucigalpa, Honduras. Sold in 1950 to Miramar Compania Navigation, Panama and renamed Moderator. Operated under the management of C. D. Pateras. Management transferred to Diamantis Pateras in 1951. Sold in 1955 to Greenville S.A., Panama and renamed Angeliki II. Operated under the management of Wigham, Richardson & Co. Sold in 1964 to Maravance Compania Navigation, Panama and renamed Conchita. Reflagged to Liberia and operated under the management of Polar Shipping Agencies. She sprang a leak and sank in the Indian Ocean 300 nautical miles (560 km) south west of the Seychelles (6°20′S 50°27′E) on 5 July 1967 whilst on a voyage from Mormugao, Portuguese India to a Polish port.

== Samconstant ==
Samconstant was built by Bethlehem Fairfield Shipyard. Her keel was laid on 14 March 1944. She was launched on 14 April and delivered on 26 April. To the MoWT under Lend-Lease. Operated under the management of Furness, Withy & Co. Sold in 1947 to Sea Steamship Co. and renamed Skipsea. Operated under the management of William Brown, Atkinson & Co. Sold in 1948 to Larrinaga Steamship Co. and renamed Ramon de Larrinaga. Sold in 1952 to Okeanoporos Shipping Corp. and renamed Okeanoporos. Reflagged to Liberia and operated under the management of N. J. Pateras. Renamed Kostis A. Georgilis in 1962 and reflagged to Greece. She suffered an explosion in her engine room and caught fire on 3 November 1967 whilst on a voyage from Rangoon, Burma to Colombo, Ceylon, becoming stranded in the Cocos Islands. She was abandoned as a total loss.

== Samcree ==
Samcree was built by Bethlehem Fairfield Shipyard. Her keel was laid on 7 December 1943. She was launched on 31 December and delivered on 14 January 1944. To the MoWT under Lend-Lease. Operated under the management of A. Holt & Co. To the USMC in 1947 and laid up in the James River. She was scrapped at Pusan, South Korean in March 1970.

== Samcrest ==
Samcrest was built by Bethlehem Fairfield Shipyard. Her keel was laid on 3 April 1944. She was launched on 5 May and delivered on 15 May. To the MoWT under Lend-Lease. Operated under the management of Ellerman & Bucknall Steamship Co. Sold in 1947 to Ellerman Lines Ltd. and renamed City of Leeds, remaining under the same management. Sold in 1960 to Grosvenor Shipping Co., London and renamed Grosvenor Explorer. She was scrapped at Hong Kong in March 1965.

== Samdak ==
Samdak was built by Bethlehem Fairfield Shipyard. Her keel was laid on 4 September 1943. She was launched as John Russell Pope on 27 September and delivered as Samdak on 6 October. To the MoWT under Lend-Lease. Operated under the management of Moss Hutchison Line. Sold in 1947 to Alpha South African Steamship Co. and renamed Alpha Vaa. Remaining under the British flag and operated under the management of Moller Line. Sold in 1948 to Alexander Shipping Co. and renamed Ledbury. Operated under the management of Houlder Bros. Sold in 1961 to the Polish Government and renamed Kopalnia Czelandz. Operated under the management of Polska Żegluga Morska, Szczeczin. Sold to her managers in 1972. She arrived at Faslane, United Kingdom for scrapping in February 1973.

== Sam Dale ==
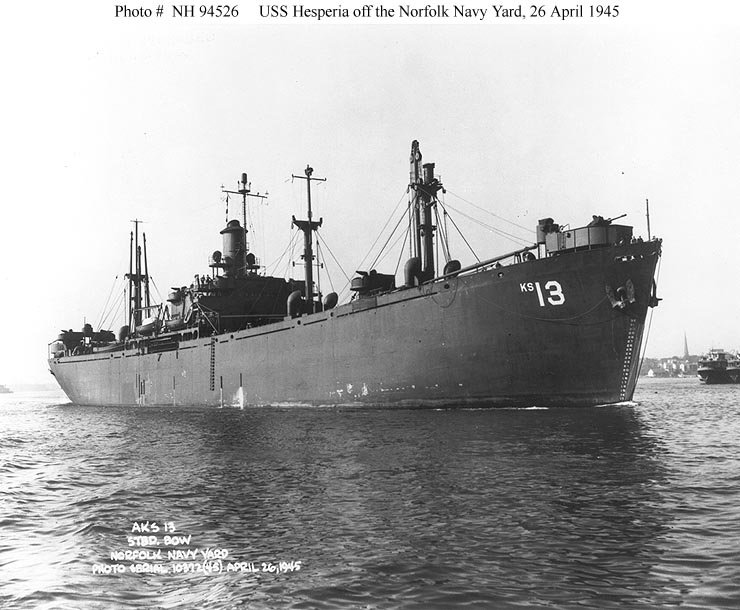
USS Hesperia

Sam Dale was built by Delta Shipbuilding Company. Her keel was laid on 9 October 1944. She was launched as Sam Dale on 18 November and delivered as Hesperia on 9 December. To the United States Navy. Converted for naval use by Norfolk Naval Shipyard, Norfolk, Virginia. To USMC in 1947, laid up in Suisun Bay. She was sold for scrapping at Kaohsiung in March 1973.

== Samdaring ==
Samdaring was built by New England Shipbuilding Corporation. Her keel was laid on 24 January 1944. She was launched on 11 March and delivered on 23 March. To the MoWT under Lend-Lease. Operated under the management of Prince Line Ltd. Sold in 1947 to Furness, Withy & Co. and renamed Pacific Ranger. Sold in 1952 to Compania Navigation Somelga, Panama and renamed San Dimitris. Operated under the management of Lemos & Pateras. Sold in 1958 to Albaro Società Italiana di Navigazione, Genoa and renamed Priaruggia. Rebuilt at Genoat in 1960. Her fore section was joined to the stern section of the Liberty ship Albaro to form a new vessel 511 feet 0 inches (155.75 m) long and 8,481 GRT named Albaro. Sold in 1963 to Industriale Maritima, Genoa. Sold later that year to Aegean Compania Navigation, Panama and renamed Aigaion. Reflagged to Greece and operated under the management of Phoenix Maritime Agencies. She was scrapped at Osaka, Japan in September 1968.

== Samdart ==
Samdart was built by Southeastern Shipbuilding Corporation. Her keel was laid on 21 December 1943. She was launched on 23 February 1944 and delivered on 13 March. To the MoWT under Lend-Lease. Operated under the management of Mungo, Campbell & Co. Sold in 1947 to Pool Shipping Co. and renamed Sedgpool. Operated under the management of Sir R. Ropner & Co. Sold in 1954 to Tabor Shipping Co., Nassau, Bahamas and renamed Bobara, remaining under the British flag. She ran aground off Rhosneigr, Anglesey on 24 January 1955 whilst on a voyage from a port in New Brunswick, Dominion of Canada to Manchester. Sold in 1956 to Marinos & Frangos Ltd., London and renamed Flevariotissa. Sold in 1958 to Apiganos Corp., Panama and renamed Kapetan Andreas. Reflagged to Costa Rica and operated under the management of Lemos & Pateras. Reflagged to Greece later that year. Sold in 1965 to Maractiva Compania Navigation, Panama and renamed Kitsa, remaining under the Greek flag. She was scrapped at Kaohsiung in February 1967.

== Samdauntless ==
Samdauntless was built by Bethlehem Fairfield Shipyard. Her keel was laid on 6 March 1944. She was launched on 3 April and delivered on 15 April. To the MoWT under Lend-Lease. Operated under the management of William Thompson & Co. Sold in 1947 to Ben Line Steamers Ltd. and renamed Bendoran, remaining under the same management. Sold in 1953 to Thalassoporos Steamship Corp., Panama and renamed Thalassoporos. Reflagged to Liberia and operated under the management of Pateras Ltd. Sold in 1958 to Pateronisos Shipping Corp., Panama and renamed Pateronisos. Reflagged to Greece, remaining under the same management. Sold in 1960 to Loreta Compania Navigation, Andros, Greece and renamed Lamyrefs. Operated under the management of Rethymnis & Kulukundis. She was scrapped at Kaohsiung in June 1967.

== Samdee ==
Samdee was built by J. A. Jones Construction Co., Brunswick. Her keel was laid on 23 October 1943. She was launched as Patrick H. Morrissey on 9 December and delivered as Samdee on 17 December. To the MoWT under Lend-Lease. Operated under the management of T. & J. Brocklebank Ltd. Sold in 1947 to J. & C. Harrison Ltd., London and renamed Malabar. Sold in 1961 to Omonia Compania Navigation, Panama and renamed Omonia. Reflagged to Lebanon and operated under the management of Tharros Shipping Co. Management transferred to Pegasus Ocean Services in 1964. She was scrapped at Hirao in 1967.

== Samderry ==
Samderry was built by New England Shipbuilding Corporation. Her keel was laid on 29 January 1944. She was launched on 19 March and delivered on 29 March. To the Mowt under Lend-Lease. Operated under the management of J. & C. Harrison Ltd., London. Sold to her managers in 1947 and renamed Harpagon. Sold in 1958 to Parpanta Compania Navigation, Panama and renamed Maria Xilas. Reflagged to Liberia and operated under the management of A. Lusi Ltd. Reflagged to Greece in 1959. Placed under the management of J. C. Carras & Sons in 1965. She was scrapped at Hirao in June 1967.

== Samderwent ==
Samderwent was built by New England Shipbuilding Corporation. Her keel was laid on 14 January 1944. She was launched on 7 March and delivered on 14 March. To the MoWT under Lend-Lease. Operated under the management of Cayzer, Irvine & Co. Ltd. Management transferred to Frank C. Strick & Co. in 1947. Sold later that year to Clan Line Steamers Ltd. and renamed Clan McFayden. Operated under the management of Cayzer, Irvine & Co. Ltd. Sold in 1958 to Compania Navigation Betacruz, Panama and renamed Betavista. Operated under the management of Adelphi Vergottis. Reflagged to Greece in 1962. Sold in 1968 to Thakur Shipping Co., Bombay and renamed Varuna Devi. She was scrapped at Kaohsiung in April 1971.

== Samdon ==
Samdon was built by New England Shipbuilding Corporation. Her keel was laid on 6 November 1943. She was launched on 20 December and delivered on 31 December. To the MoWT under Lend-Lease. Operated under the management of Cayzer, Irvine & Co. Ltd. Management transferred to Norton Lilly Management Co. in 1946. Laid up in the James River later that year. She was scrapped at Philadelphia in October 1961.

== Samdonard ==
Samdonard was built by Bethlehem Fairfield Shipyard. Her keel was laid on 18 February 1944. She was launched on 18 March and delivered on 29 March. To the MoWT under Lend-Lease. Operated under the management of McCowan & Gross Ltd. Sold in 1947 to Claymore Shipping Co., Cardiff and renamed Daybeam. Sold in 1952 to Isla Malvina Compania Navigation, Panama and renamed Alba. Operated under the management of Central American Steamship Agency. Management transferred to Olympic Maritime S.A. in 1953. Sold in 1960 to Arisona Argentina S.A., Buenos Aires. Sold in 1961 to Plamar S.A., Panama and renamed Albamar. Reflagged to Liberia and operated under the management of Olympic Maritime S.A. Sold in 1962 to Albama Compania Uruguaya de Navigacione. Reflagged to Liberia and operated under the management of Ocean Steamship Agency. Sold in 1964 to Extramar Maritime S.A. and renamed Albaran. Reflagged to Panama and operated under the management of Central American Steamship Agency. She was scrapped at Kaohsiung in 1968.

== Samearn ==
Samearn was built by New England Shipbuilding Corporation. Her keel was laid on 24 November 1943. She was launched on 13 January 1944. She was launched on 20 December and delivered on 31 December. To the MoWT under Lend-Lease. Operated under the management of Houlder Line Ltd. Sold in 1947 to Claremont Shipping Co. Ltd. and renamed Clarepark. Operated under the management of Houlder Bros. & Co. Sold in 1950 to Argosam Shipping Co. and renamed Argolib. Operated under the management of A. Lusi Ltd. Sold in 1956 to West Africa Navigation Ltd. and renamed African Princess. Operated under the management of T. J. Verrando & Co. Management transferred to Transamerican Steamship Corp. in 1963. She was scrapped at Kaohsiung in August 1968.

== Sameden ==
Samdeden was built by Bethlehem Fairfield Shipyard. Her keel was laid on 2 February 1944. She was launched on 3 March and delivered on 14 March. To the MoWT under Lend-Lease. Operated under the management of Houlder Line Ltd. Sold in 1947 to Mill Hill Steamship Co. and renamed Mill Hill. Operated under the management of Counties Ship Management Ltd., London. Sold to her managers in 1951. Sold later that year to Costa de Marfil Compania Navigation, Panama and renamed Educator. Reflagged to Liberia and operated under the management of Pateras Ltd. Sold in 1961 to Compania Navigation Kanaris, Panama and renamed Kanaris. Reflagged to Greece, remaining under the same management. Sold in 1966 to Active Steamship Co. and renamed Splendid Sky. Reflagged to Panama and operated under the management of Shipping & Financial S.A. She ran aground in the Scheldt on 4 October 1969 whilst on a voyage from Antwerp, Belgium to La Spezia. She was refloated but found to be damaged beyond economic repair. She was scrapped at Antwerp in January 1970.

== Samesk ==
Samesk was built by Bethlehem Fairfield Shipyard. Her keel was laid on 22 December 1943. She was launched on 22 January 1944 and delivered on 5 February. To the MoWT under Lend-Lease. Operated under the management of New Zealand Shipping Co. Sold in 1947 to Federal Steam Navigation Co. and renamed Leicester. She developed a severe list in the Atlantic Ocean (40°27′N 55°20′W) on 16 September 1948 whilst on a voyage from Tilbury, United Kingdom to New York and was abandoned. Thirty-nine of her 45 crew were rescued by the Argentine Victory ship Tropero, and the American ship Cecil Bean. Leicester was taken under tow on 21 September and arrived at Bermuda on 3 October. She was driven ashore in a hurricane on 7 October. Refloated on 19 October and departed under tow for New York on 24 October. Subsequently repaired at Baltimore. Sold in 1950 to Nassau Maritime Co., Nassau and renamed Inagua, remaining under the British flag. Requisitioned by the MoT for use as a storeship during the Suez Crisis. Sold in 1958 to Compania Navigation Termar, Panama and renamed Serafim Topic. Operated under the management of Antonio Topic. Management transferred to Marfin Management Trust in 1962. Renamed Jela Topic later that year. Sold in 1965 to Viking Shipping Co. and renamed Viking Liberty. Remaining under the Liberian flag and operated under the management of Pacific Steamship Agency. She ran aground off Trinidad on 21 January 1966 whilst on a voyage from Recife, Brazil to New York. She was refloated on 1 February and towed to New Orleans. Repairs were deemed uneconomic. She was scrapped at Santander in August 1966. This ship is the subject of Farley Mowat's book The Serpent's Coil.

== Samettrick ==
Samettrick was built by Bethlehem Fairfield Shipyard. Her keel was laid on 6 December 1943. She was launched on 31 December and delivered on 12 January 1944. To the MoWT under Lend-Lease. Operated under the management of P & O Steam Navigation Co. Sold in 1947 to Houlder Line Ltd and renamed Elstree Grange. Operated under the management of Houlder Bros. Co. To the Polish Government in 1960 and renamed Kopalnia Miechowice. Operated under the management of Polska Żegluga Morska. Sold to her managers in 1972. Her rudder was damaged off the coast of Portugal on 8 January 1972 whilst on a voyage from Gdynia, Poland to an Italian port. She was towed in to Lisbon before continuing her voyage. She was scrapped at Split in May 1972.

== Sameveron ==
Sameveron was built by Bethlehem Fairfield Shipyard. Her keel was laid on 10 December 1943. She was launched on 7 January 1944 and delivered on 17 January. To the MoWT under Lend-Lease. Operated under the management of Orient Steam Navigation Company. Developed a severe list in the Atlantic Ocean in 1944 when her ballast shifted in a storm. She was subsequently righted. Sold in 1947 to The Bank Line and renamed Ericbank. Operated under the management of Andrew Weir & Co. Sold to China in 1959 and renamed Nan Hai 146. To China Ocean Shipping Co. in 1973. Renamed Hong Qi 146 in 1976. Probably scrapped in 1977.

== Samfairy ==
Samfairy was built by J. A. Jones Construction Co, Brunswick. Her keel was laid on 31 January 1944. She was launched on 16 March and delivered on 28 March. To the MoWT under Lend-Lease. Operated under the management of Haldin & Phillips Ltd. Sold in 1947 to Eastern Seas Steamship Co. and renamed Admiral Cunningham. Operated under the management of S. G. Embiricos. Sold in 1952 to Sociedad Financiera de Bienes Raices, Panama and renamed Aello. Reflagged to Costa Rica, remaining under the same management. Sold in 1955 to Escorial Compania Navigation, Panama and renamed Kymo, remaining under the same flag and management. Reflagged to Greece in 1961. Sold in 1965 to Concord Trading Corp., and renamed Euthalia. Remaining under the Greek flag and operated under the management of Ormos Shipping Co. She was scrapped at Onomichi in February 1969.

== Samfaithful ==
Samfaithful was built by Bethlehem Fairfield Shipyard. Her keel was laid on 21 March 1944. She was launched on 26 April and delivered on 9 May. To the MoWT under Lend-Lease. Operated under the management of Royal Mail Lines. Sold to her managers in 1947 and renamed Balantia. Sold in 1958 to Compania Navigation Betacruz, Panama and renamed Betamar. Reflagged to Liberia and operated under the management of A. Vergottis. Sold in 1965 to Acme Shipping Co., Nicosia and renamed Acme. Operated under the management of J. Livanos & Sons. She was scrapped at Shanghai in April 1969.

== Samfeugh ==
Samfeugh was built by Bethlehem Fairfield Shipyard. Her keel was laid on 9 December 1943. She was launched on 8 January 1944 and delivered on 19 January. To the MoWT under Lend-Lease. Operated under the management of Charles Hill & Sons. Returned to USMC in 1947, laid up in the James River. She was scrapped at Philadelphia in August 1969.

== Samfield ==
Samfield was built by Bethlehem Fairfield Shipyard. Her keel was laid on 23 October 1943. She was launched as Daniel Appleton on 20 November and delivered as Samfield on 30 November. Built for the Ministry of War Transport (MoWT), she was operated under the management of Cayzer, Irvine & Co. Management transferred to W. Runciman & Co. in 1946. Sold in 1947 Moor Line and renamed Southmoor, remaining under the same management. Sold in 1950 to Marine Enterprises Ltd., London and renamed Marine Pride. Sold in 1951 to Maritima del Sur Compania Navigation, Panama and renamed St. Spero. Reflagged to Costa Rica and operated under the management of Lyras Bros. Sold in 1953 to Liciferis Compania Navigation, Panama and renamed Endeavour. Remaining under the Costa Rican flag and operated under the management of S. G. Embiricos. Sold in 1959 to Ocean Span Corp. and renamed Valiant Liberty. reflagged to Liberia and operated under the management of Ocean Carriers Corp. Sold in 1960 to Phoenix Steamship Corp and renamed Skyllas. Remaining under the Liberian flag and operated under the management of Cargo & Tankship Management Corp. Sold later that year to Taiwan Ming Sung Industrial Co., Keelung, Taiwan. Renamed Hwei Sung and reflagged to China. She ran aground at Naoyetsu, Japan on 30 October 1961. Refloated on 7 November but declared a constructive total loss. She was scrapped at Osaka in February 1962.

== Samfinn ==
Samfinn was built by J. A. Jones Construction Company, Brunswick. Her keel was laid on 14 February 1944. She was launched on 31 March and delivered on 13 April. To the MoWT under Lend-Lease. Operated under the management of Donaldson Bros. & Black. Returned to USMC in 1947 and laid up at Mobile, Alabama. She was scrapped there in January 1962.

== Samfleet ==
Samfleet was built by Bethlehem Fairfield Shipyard. Her keel was laid on 25 March 1944. She was launched on 25 April and delivered on 30 April. To the MoWT under Lend-Lease. Operated under the management of Andrew Weir & Co. Sold in 1947 to Bank Line and renamed Corabank, remaining under the same management. Sold in 1959 to Verder & Co., Hong Kong and renamed Santa Granda. Placed under the management of Shipping Managers (Hong Kong) Ltd. in 1960, then Jebmel Shipping Management in 1963. She was scrapped at Hong Kong in February 1968.

== Samflora ==
Samflora was built by Bethlehem Fairfield Shipyard. Her keel was laid on 12 October 1943. She was launched at Israel J. Merritt on 9 November and delivered as Samflora on 17 November. To the Ministry of War Transport (MoWT) under Lend-Lease. She was operated under the management of Union-Castle Mail Steamship Co. Sold in 1947 to Pulteney Hill Steamship Co. and renamed Primrose Hill. Operated under the management of Counties Ship Management. Sold in 1949 to London & Overseas Freighters, London. Renamed London Vendor in 1950. Sold in 1952 to Argequipa Compania Navigation, Panama and renamed Cabanos. Operated under the management of Sea Traffic & Trading Corp. Sold in 1963 to Compania Santa Helle, Panama and renamed Thebean. Operated under the management of Camberley Steamship Co. Sold in 1964 to Compania Santa Roberta and re-registered to Greece. She was scrapped at Onomichi in March 1968.

== Samforth ==
Samforth was built by Bethlehem Fairfield Shipyard. Her keel was laid on 3 December 1943. She was launched on 23 December and delivered on 31 December. To the MoWT under Lend-Lease. Operated under the management of A. Holt & Co. Returned to USMC in 1948 and laid up at Mobile. She was scrapped at Panama City, Florida in October 1970.

== Samfoyle ==
Samfoyle was built by J. A. Jones Construction Company, Brunswick. Her keel was laid on 8 February 1944. She was launched on 23 March and delivered on 31 March. To the MoWT under Lend-Lease. Operated under the management of Cunard White Star Ltd. Sold to her managers in 1947 and renamed Vardulia. Sold in 1954 to Nueva Valencia Compania Navigatio, Panama and renamed Valencia. Operated under the management of N. J. Goulandris. Sold in 1957 to Compania de Navigation Almirante, Panama and renamed Seacob. Operated under the management of T. J. Verrando & Co. Management transferred to Transamerican Steamship Corp. in 1964. She was scrapped at Hong Kong in December 1968.

== Samfreedom ==
Samfreedom was built by Bethlehem Fairfield Shipyard. Her keel was laid on 8 April 1944. She was launched on 10 May and delivered on 23 May. To the MoWT under Lend-Lease. Operated under the management of Counties Ship Management Co. Sold in 1947 to Finnamore Shipping Co. and renamed Finnamore Hill, remaining under the same management. Sold in 1948 to Durban Shipping Enterprises and renamed Wye Valley, remaining under the British flag. Sold in 1949 to Valley Navigation Co., London. Operated under the management of Lykiardopulo & Co. Sold in 1951 to Alagoas Compania Navigation, Panama and renamed Cavoplatanos. Operated under the management of Ocean Shipping & Trading Co. Sold in 1952 to Monteverde Compania Armamente, Panama and renamed Lilibet. Operated under the management of Carolus S.A. Sold in 1954 to Compania de Navigation Hellespont, Panama and renamed Hellespont. Operated under the management of Todos Mares S.A. Sold in 1963 to Stamle Compania Navigation, Panama and renamed Alice. Reflagged to Greece and operated under the management of Franco Shipping Co. Sold in 1967 to Alice Shipping Co. Reflagged to Cyprus, remaining under the same management. She was scrapped at Gandia, Spain in September 1971.

== Samgallion ==
Samgallion was built by Bethlehem Fairfield Shipyard. Her keel was laid on 19 February 1944. She was launched on 22 March and delivered on 31 March. To the MoWT under Lend-Lease. Operated under the management of E. J. Sutton & Co. Sold in 1947 to Dalhousie Steam & Motor Ship Co., London and renamed Marietta Dal. She was driven ashore on Smith Rock, 2 nautical miles (3.7 km) of the Cape Moreton Lighthouse, Australia on 15 May 1950 whilst on a voyage from Galveston, Texas, United States to Adelaide, Australia. She broke in two and was a total loss. The wreck was subsequently scrapped.

== Samgara ==
Samgara was built by Bethlehem Fairfield Shipyard. Her keel was laid on 19 October 1943. She was launched as James Carroll on 16 November and delivered as Samgara on 25 November. To the MoWT under Lend-Lease. Operated under the management of A. Holt & Co. Sold in 1947 to Ocean Steamship Co. and renamed Titan, remaining under the same management. Sold in 1950 to Glen Line Ltd., London and renamed Flintshire. Sold in 1957 to Ocean Steamship Co. and renamed Titan. Operated under the management of A. Holt & Co. Sold in 1962 to Tidewater Commercial Co., Baltimore and renamed Titanus. Re-registered to Liberia. She was scrapped at Mihara, Japan in December 1969.

== Samgaudie ==
Samgaudie was built by Bethlehem Fairfield Shipyard. Her keel was laid on 21 January 1944. She was launched on 24 February and delivered on 8 March. To the MoWT under Lend-Lease. Operated under the management of T. & J. Brocklebank. Sold in 1947 to Moller Line, London and renamed Norah Moller. Sold in 1948 to Charente Steamship Co. and renamed Statesman. Operated under the management of T. & J. Harrison Ltd. Sold in 1962 to Compania Navigation Aktina, Panama and renamed Aktis. Reflagged to Liberia and operated under the management of Tharros Shipping Co. Management transferred to Pegasus Ocean Services in 1964. She was scrapped at Kaohsiung in 1968.

== Samglory ==
Samglory was built by Bethlehem Fairfield Shipyard. Her keel was laid on 27 March 1944. She was launched on 22 April and delivered on 30 April. To the MoWT under Lend-Lease. Operated under the management of Dodd, Thomson & Co. Sold in 1947 to Strick Line Ltd., London and renamed Serbistan. Operated under the management of Frank C. Strick & Co. Sold in 1962 to Compania de Navigation Surava, Panama and renamed Calypso. Sold in 1968 to Panamaic Shipping Co., Panama. Reflagged to Liberia and operated under the management of Tsavliris Ltd. She was scrapped at Hong Kong in March 1969.

== Samhain ==
Samhain was built by Bethlehem Fairfield Shipyard. Her keel was laid on 15 July 1943. She was launched as Henry Van Dyke on 13 August and delivered as Samhain on 23 August. To the MoWT under Lend-Lease. Operated under the management of Ellerman & Bucknall Steamship Co. Sold in 1947 to Ellerman Lines Ltd. and renamed City of Portsmouth, remaining under her previous management. She collided with the quayside at Bombay on 26 January 1958 and was damaged. Sold in 1959 to Demetrios P. Margaronis, Athens and renamed Efcharis. Placed under the management of Angelos Ltd. in 1960. Management transferred to Victoria Steamship Co. in 1965. Laid up at Piraeus in 1970, she was scrapped at Kynosoura, Greece, or in Turkey in 1971.

== Samharle ==
Samharle was built by Bethlehem Fairfield Shipyard. Her keel was laid on 21 November 1943. She was launched as Martha C. Thomas on 14 December and delivered as Samharle on 23 December. To the MoWT under Lend-Lease. Operated under the management of A. Holt & Co. Sold in 1947 to Ocean Steamship Co., and renamed Troilus. Sold in 1950 to Compania de Navigation San Agustin, Panama and renamed Green River. Reflagged to Liberia and operated under the management of Sociètè d'Etudes et de Gestion. She was scrapped at Osaka in 1963.

== Samholt ==
Samholt was built by California Shipbuilding Corporation. Her keel was laid on 10 June 1943. She was launched as Jacob Riis on 3 July and delivered as Samholt on 17 July. To the MoWT under Lend-Lease, she was operated under the management of Cunard White Star Line. To the USMC in 1958, she was laid up in the James River. She was scrapped at Baltimore in October 1959.

== Samhope ==
Samhope was built by Bethlehem Fairfield Shipyard. Her keel was laid on 25 February 1944. She was launched on 25 March and delivered on 5 April. To the MoWT under Lend-Lease. Operated under the management of Sir William Reardon Smith & Sons. Sold in 1947 to Moller Line Ltd. and renamed Rosalie Moller. Sold in 1948 to Charente Steamship Co. and renamed Sucessor [sic?]. Operated under the management of T. & J. Harrison Ltd. Sold in 1963 to Zela Shipping Co., London and renamed Zela M. Sold in 1967 to Protaras Shipping Co. Reflagged to Cyprus and operated under the management of Transmarine Shipping Agencies. Sold in 1968 to the Cuban Government and renamed Ignacio Agramonte. Operated under the management of Empresa Navegacion Mambisa. She was scrapped at San Esteban de Pravia, Spain in 1974.

== Samhorn ==
Samhorn was built by Southeastern Shipbuilding Corporation. Her keel was laid on 8 December 1943. She was launched on 5 February 1944 and delivered on 25 February. To the MoWT under Lend-Lease. Operated under the management of Donaldson, Bros. & Black. Returned to USMC in 1948 and laid up at Beaumont. She was scrapped at Orange, Texas in 1960.

== Sam Houston ==
Sam Houston was built by Todd Houston Shipbuilding Corporation. Her keel was laid on 18 July 1941. She was launched on 29 March 1942 and delivered on 27 May. Built for the WSA, she was operated under the management of Waterman Steamship Corporation. She was torpedoed, shelled and sunk in the Atlantic Ocean 160 nautical miles (300 km) off the Virgin Islands (19°21′N 62°22′W) by U-203 on 28 June 1942 whilst on a voyage from Mobile to Bombay.

== Sam Houston II ==
Sam Houston II was built by Todd Houston Shipbuilding Corporation. Her keel was laid on 18 May 1943. She was launched on 30 June and delivered on 14 July. She was scrapped at Portland, Maine in December 1959.

== Samida ==
Samida was built by California Shipbuilding Corporation. Her keel was laid on 21 August 1943. She was launched on 12 September and delivered as Samida on 25 September. To the MoWT, operated under the management of Peninsular and Oriental Steam Navigation Company. She was torpedoed and sunk in the English Channel 3 nautical miles (5.6 km) off Dungeness by a midget submarine on 9 April 1943 whilst on a voyage from Barry to Antwerp, Belgium. The wreck was subsequently dispersed by explosives.

== Samidway ==
Samidway was built by New England Shipbuilding Corporation. Her keel was laid on 21 March 1944. She was launched on 6 May and delivered on 17 May. To the MoWT under Lend-Lease. Operated under the management of A. Hold & Co. Sold in 1947 to Charente Steamship Co. and renamed Scholar. Operated under the management of T. & J. Harrison. Sold in 1964 to Karavena Marine Enterprises, Panama and renamed Kostatis Yemelos. Reflagged to Greece and operated under the management of J. C. Carras. She was scrapped at Mihara in March 1969.

== Samindoro ==
Samindoro was built by Bethlehem Fairfield Shipyard. Her keel was laid on 26 April 1944. She was launched on 5 June and delivered on 15 June. To the MoWT under Lend-Lease. Operated under the management of Headlam & Son. Sold in 1947 to Rowland & Marwood's Steamship Co. and renamed Sandsend, remaining under the same management. Requisitioned by the MoT as a storeship in 1956 due to the Suez Crisis. She was scrapped at Kaohsiung in December 1967.

== Samingoy ==
Samingoy was built by J. A. Jones Construction Company, Brunswick. Her keel was laid on 24 March 1944. She was launched on 30 April and delivered on 13 May. To the MoWT under Lend-Lease. Operated under the management of New Zealand Shipping Company. Sold in 1947 to Federal Steam Navigation Co., London and renamed Stafford. Sold in 1950 to Nassau Maritime Co., Nassau and renamed Bimini, remaining under the British flag. Placed under the management of Riccardo Arco in 1952. Sold on 1959 to Bahamas Navigation Ltd., Nassau, remaining under the British flag. Sold in 1961 to Compania Auxiliar Maritima, Costa Rica and renamed Hernan Cortes. Reflagged to Panama and operated under the management of Harris & Dixon Ltd. She ran aground on the Alacran Reef, off the Yucatán Peninsula, Mexico on 15 October 1966 whilst on a voyage from Tampa, Florida, United States to Montevideo. She was refloated on 11 February 1967 and towed in to Coatzacoalcos, Mexico. Declared a constructive total loss, she was scrapped at "Veracruz, Puerto Rico" in August 1967.

== Saminver ==
Saminver was built by Bethlehem Fairfield Shipyard. Her keel was laid on 10 January 1944. She was launched on 8 February and delivered on 22 February. To the MoWT under Lend-Lease. Operated under the management of Blue Star Line. On 4 September 1946, she rendezvoused with the Liberty ship Sambrian, in distress in the Mediterranean Sea following the loss of her propeller, and towed her to Alexandria. Returned to the USMC in 1948 and laid up at Beaumont. She was scrapped at New Orleans in March 1964.

== Samite ==
Samite was built by Bethlehem Fairfield Shipyard. Her keel was laid on 22 July 1943. Launched as Holland Thompson on 18 August, she was delivered as Samite on 26 August. To the MoWT under Lend-Lease, she was operated under the management of A. Holt & Co. Returned to USMC in 1947 and laid up at Mobile. She was scrapped at Panama City, Florida in March 1963.

== Samjack ==
Samjack was built by Bethlehem Fairfield Shipyard. Her keel was laid on 11 February 1944. She was launched on 14 March and delivered on 27 March. To the MoWT under Lend-Lease. Operated under the management of A. Holt & Co. Sold in 1947 to Ocean Steamship Co. and renamed Tydeus, remaining under the management of A. Holt & Co. Sold in 1950 to Glen Line Ltd. and renamed Glenberg. Sold in 1958 to Forman Shipping Trading Inc. and renamed Roan. Reflagged to Panama and operated under the management of Augusto Moretti & Co. Sold in 1960 to West African Carriers Corp., Lugano, Switzerland and renamed Jucar. Reflagged to Liberia. She was scrapped at Mihara in September 1967.

== Sam Jackson ==
Sam Jackson was built by Oregon Shipbuilding Corporation. Her keel was laid on 11 January 1943. She was launched on 9 February and delivered on 17 February. She was scrapped at Mobile in May 1968.

== Samkansa ==
Samkansa was built by Bethlehem Fairfield Shipyard. Her keel was laid on 31 August 1943. She was launched as Nikola Tesla on 25 September and delivered as Samkansa on 4 October. To the United Kingdom under Lend-Lease. Operated under the management of Orient Steam Navigation Company. Sold in 1947 to Hadley Shipping Co. and renamed Cerinthus. Operated under the management of Houlder Bros. & Co. Sold in 1952 to Rio Amado Compania Navigation, Panama and renamed Phassa. Operated under the management of Capeside Steamship Co. Sold in 1953 to Compania de Navigation Cerro La Plata and renamed Urania. Operated under the management of Coulouthros Ltd. Management transferred to Syros Shipping Co. in 1960. Sold in 1964 to Evergreen Navigation Corp. and renamed Concord Venture. Operated under the management of Wah Kwong & Co. She was scrapped at Sakaide in January 1970.

== Samkey ==
Samkey was built by Bethlehem Fairfield Shipyard. Her keel was laid on 24 November 1943. She was launched as Carl Thusgaard on 17 December and delivered as Samkey on 24 December. To the MoWT under Lend-Lease, she was operated under the management of New Zealand Shipping Company. Last reported on 31 January 1948 at 41°48′N 24°00′W, whilst on a voyage from London to Santiago de Cuba, Cuba. Presumed that her ballast shifted and she foundered. A board of inquiry heard that she was not fitted with shifting boards.

== Samlamu ==
Samlamu was built by Bethlehem Fairfield Shipyard. Her keel was laid on 10 May 1944. She was launched on 14 June and delivered on 26 June. To the MoWT under Lend-Lease. Operated under the management of Sir William Reardon Smith & Sons. Sold in 1947 to Alexander Shipping Co. and renamed Kingsbury. Operated under the management of Houlder Bros. & Co. Requisitioned by the MoT in 1956 for use as a storeship during the Suez Crisis. To the Polish Government in 1960 and renamed Huta Bedzin. Operated under the management of Polska Żegluga Morska. Converted to a floating warehouse in 1969 and renamed M-ZP-GDY-6, then MP-ZP-GDY-6. Used at Gdynia. She arrived at Hamina, Finland for scrapping in July 1982.

== Samlea ==
Samlea was built by Bethlehem Fairfield Shipyard. Her keel was laid on 7 February 1944. She was launched on 10 March and delivered on 22 March. To the MoWT under Lend-Lease. Operated under the management of Ellerman & Bucknall Steamship Co. Sold in 1947 to Ellerman Lines Ltd. and renamed City of Colchester, remaining under the management of Ellerman & Bucknall Steamship Co. She was damaged by fire at Dundee on 8 March 1953. Sold in 1959 to Alberta Shipping Co. and renamed Sunset. Reflagged to Liberia and operated under the management of Frinton Shipbrokers Ltd. Management transferred to Pegasus Ocean Services in 1964. Sold in 1965 to M. & A. Shipping Co., Panama and renamed Maria-Eleni. Remaining under the Liberian flag and operated under the management of Ionian Sea Operators. Sold in 1966 to Island Marine Associates, Panama, remaining under the same flag and management. Renamed Blue Wave in 1967. She was scrapped at Matsuyama, Japan in 1968.

== Samleven ==
Samleven was built by Bethlehem Fairfield Shipyard. Her keel was laid on 1 January 1944. She was launched on 31 January and delivered on 14 February. To the MoWT under Lend-Lease. Operated under the management of Port Line Ltd. Sold in 1947 to Tramp Shipping Development Co. and renamed Bisham Hill. Operated under the management of Counties Ship Management Co. Sold in 1952 to Global Carriers Inc., Monrovia and renamed Nausica. Sold in 1956 to Leonardo Arrivabene Compagnia de Navigazione, Venice and renamed Praglia. Sold in 1957 to Panormita Navigazione, Palermo. Sold in 1960 to Olisman Compania Navigation, Costa Rica and renamed Vassiliki. Reflagged to Lebanon and operated under the management of Purvis Shipping Co. Management transferred to Franco Shipping Co. in 1961. Sold in 1967 to Vassiliki Shipping Co. Reflagged to Cyprus and operated under the joint management of Franco Shipping Co. and Purvis Shipping Co. Sold in 1968 to Franco Shipping & Management Co., remaining under the same flag and management. She ran aground on Mayaguana Island, Bahamas (22°28′N 73°08′W) on 31 March 1970 whilst on a voyage from Augusta to Havana, Cuba. She was abandoned and subsequently offered for sale "as lies".

== Samleyte ==
Samleyte was built by J. A. Jones Construction Company, Brunswick. Her keel was laid on 7 March 1944. She was launched on 20 April and delivered on 29 April. To the MoWT under Lend-Lease. Operated under the management of C. T. Bowring & Co. Returned to the USMC in 1947, laid up in the James River. She was scrapped at Baltimore in November 1960.

== Samlistar ==
Samlistar was built by Bethlehem Fairfield Shipyard. Her keel was laid on 17 April 1944. She was launched on 19 May and delivered on 31 May. To the MoWT under Lend-Lease. Operated under the management of Mungo, Campbell & Co. Sold in 1947 to Sir R. Ropner & Co., Darlington and renamed Hurworth. Sold in 1954 to Compania de Navigation Zita, Panama and renamed Suerte. Reflagged to Costa Rica and operated under the management of A. Lusi Ltd. Management transferred to Transmarine Shipping Agencies in 1956. Reflagged to Panama in 1958. Sold in 1962 to Vita Shipping Corp. Reflagged to Lebanon, remaining under the same management. She ran aground off Shut-in Island, 15 nautical miles (28 km) east of Halifax, Canada on 9 January 1962 whilst on a voyage from Brest, France to Halifax. Declared a constructive total loss, she was refloated on 5 April and towed out to sea and sunk the next day.

== Samlong ==
Samlong was built by New England Shipbuilding Corporation. Her keel was laid on 20 September 1943. She was launched as Elias H. Derby on 7 November and delivered as Samlong on 17 November. To the MoWT under Lend-Lease. Operated under the management of Prince Line Ltd. Severely damaged 2 nautical miles (3.7 km) off Juno Beach, Normandy when attacked by Kriegsmarine Linsen boats on 3 August 1944. Towed to Gravesend, United Kingdom. Declared a constructive total loss and laid up in the River Blackwater. She was scrapped at Hendrik-Ido-Ambacht, Netherlands in January 1949.

== Samlorian ==
Samlorian was built by J. A. Jones Construction Company, Brunswick. Her keel was laid on 1 April 1944. She was launched on 14 May and delivered on 26 May. To the MoWT under Lend-Lease. Operated under the management of E. R. Management Co. Sold in 1947 to Strath Steamship Co. and renamed Helmpsey, remaining under the same management. Sold in 1949 to Clarissa Radcliffe Steamship Co. and renamed Llanover. Operated under the management of Thomas Radcliffe & Co. Sold in 1951 to Liberian Shipping Inc., Monrovia and renamed Capestar. Operated under the management of Triton Shipping Co. Renamed Athlos and reflagged to Greece in 1960. She was scrapped at Sakai, Japan in December 1966.

== Samlossie ==
Samlossie was built by Bethlehem Fairfield Shipyards. Her keel was laid on 17 January 1944. She was launched on 14 February and delivered on 26 February. To the MoWT under Lend-Lease. Operated under the management of P. Hendersonn & Co. Sold in 1947 to Barnhill Shipping & Finance Co. and renamed Barn Hill. Operated under the management of Counties Ship Management Co. Sold in 1951 to Porto Alegre Compania Navigation, Panama and renamed Porto Alegre. Reflagged to Liberia and operated under the management of Rethymnis & Kulukundis. Sold in 1954 to Kassos Steam Navigation Co., Syra, Greece and renamed Stavros. Operated under the management of Pnevmaticos Rethymnis. Sold in 1967 to Astrovivo Compania Navigation, Panama. Remaining under the Greek flag and operated under the management of J. P. Hadoulis. Sold in 1971 to Zarakes Compania Navigation, Panama and renamed Yucatan. Remaining under the Greek flag and operated under the management of Rethymnis Steamship Agency. Sold to Argentine owners in 1975 and renamed Meri Primero. She was scrapped at Campana, Argentina in June 1976.

== Samlouis ==
Samlouis was built by Bethlehem Fairfield Shipyard. Her keel was laid on 3 October 1943. She was launched as Priscilla Alden on 25 October and completed as Samlouis on 5 November. To the MoWT under Lend-Lease. Operated under the management of Ellerman's Wilson Line. Sold in 1947 to Alva Steamship Co., London and renamed Coralstone. Operated under the management of Navigation & Coal Trade Co. Sold in 1951 to Alvion Steamship Co and reflagged to Panama. Operated under the joint management of Navent Corp. and Navigation & Coal Trade Co. Sold in 1959 to Compania Argentina de Navigation Ultramar, Buenos Aires and renamed Esmeralda. She was scrapped at Kaohsiung in November 1968.

== Samloyal ==
Samloyal was built by Bethlehem Fairfield Shipyard. Her keel was laid on 22 March 1944. She was launched on 20 April and delivered on 29 April. To the MoWT under Lend-Lease. Operated under the management of B. & S. Shipping Co. Sold in 1947 to South American Saint Line, Cardiff and renamed Saint Helena. She was scrapped at Tamise, Belgium in January 1963.

== Samluzon ==
Samluzon was built by Bethlehem Fairfield Shipyard. Her keel was laid on 24 April 1944. She was launched on 27 May and delivered on 12 June. To the MoWT under Lend-Lease. Operated under the management of Morel Ltd. Sold in 1947 to Nolisement Steamship Co. and renamed Jersey May, remaining under the same management. Sold in 1950 to Larrinaga Steamship Co. and renamed Miguel de Larrinaga. Sold in 1956 to Compania Mare Nostrum, Panama and renamed Tritonia. Reflagged to Liberia and operated under the management of Goulandris Bros. She was scrapped at Hong Kong in July 1969.

== Samlyth ==
Samlyth was built by Bethlehem Fairfield Shipyard. Her keel was laid on 8 January 1944. She was launched on 7 February and delivered on 21 February. To the MoWT under Lend-Lease. Operated under the management of Moss Hutchinson Line. Sold in 1947 to South American Saint Line and renamed St. Arvans. Sold in 1963 to Sovtorgflot and renamed Sajany. She was scrapped at Split in April 1972.

== Sammex ==
Sammex was built by Bethlehem Fairfield Shipyard. Her keel was laid on 3 September 1943. She was launched as Franz Boas on 26 September and delivered as Sammex on 5 October. To the MoWT under Lend-Lease, operated under the management of General Steam Navigation Company. Sold in 1947 to Sheaf Steam Shipping Co. and renamed Sheaf Mead. Operated under the management of W. A. Souter & Co. Sold in 1952 to Gerontas Compania Navigation, Panama and renamed Gerontas. Operated under the management of A. Lusi Ltd. Driven onto a sandbank off Cardross, United Kingdom on 21 December 1954. Management transferred to G. Lemos Bros. in 1956. Ran aground off Gdynia on 24 August 1959 whilst on a voyage from Vitoria to Gdynia. Refloated on 27 August, declared a constructive total loss. She was scrapped at Hendrik-Ido-Ambacht in 1959.

== Sammont ==
Sammont was built by California Shipbuilding Corporation. Her keel was laid on 28 August 1943. She was launched as E. H. Sothern on 19 September and delivered as Sammont on 30 September. To the MoWT under Lend-Lease. Operated under the management of William Thompson & Co. Sold in 1947 to Salmonier Shipping Co. and renamed Salmonier. Remaining under the same management. Sold in 1949 to Ben Line Steamers Ltd. and renamed Benmhor, remaining under the same management. Sold in 1951 to Compania Maritima Astra, Panama and renamed Armar. Reflagged to Liberia and subsequently placed under the management of Trans-Ocean Steamship Agency. Reflagged to Greece in 1958. Lengthened at Maizuru, Japan in 1961. Now 511 feet 6 inches (155.91 m) long, assessed at 8,527 GRT. Reflagged to Liberia in 1964. Sold in 1967 to Palma Shipping Corp. and renamed Captain George K. Operated under the management of Palmco Shipping Inc. Her hull fractured off the coast of Somaliland (10°03′N 54°06′E) on 25 June 1969 whilst on a voyage from Vancouver, Canada to Eilat, Israel. She put in to Djibouti for temporary repairs. Declared a constructive total loss, she was scrapped at Kaohsiung in November 1969.

== Samneagh ==
Samneagh was built by Bethlehem Fairfield Shipyard. Her keel was laid on 24 February 1944. She was launched on 27 March and delivered on 6 April. To the MoWT under Lend-Lease. Operated under the management of P. Henderson & Co. Sold in 1947 to Stamford Shipping Co. and renamed Stamford Hill. Operated under the management of Counties Ship Management. Sold in 1951 to Pacifica Compania de Transportes, Panama and renamed Rio Mar. Operated under the management of Rethymnis & Kulukundis. Sold in 1959 to Effie Carella, Durban, Union of South Africa and renamed President Boshof. Reflagged to the United Kingdom and operated under the management of Southern Steamships Ltd. Sold in 1961 to Kyanos Steamship Corp., Monrovia and renamed Rio Mar. Reflagged to Greece and operated under the management of Coral Shipping Ltd. Sold in 1962 to Dimitri N. Carella, remaining under the same flag and management. Sold in 1965 to Marorguilio Compania Navigation, Panama and renamed Amon. Reflagged to Liberia and operated under the management of Aegis Shipping Ltd. Sold in 1966 to Aktor Shipping Co. Ltd. Reflagged to Cyprus, remaining under the same management. She was scrapped at Hsinkang, China in October 1968.

== Samnebra ==
Samnebra was built by Bethlehem Fairfield Shipyard. Her keel was laid on 12 September 1943. She was launched as Lyon G. Tyler on 10 October and delivered as Samnebra on 18 October. To the MoWT under Lend-Lease. Operated under the management of Cayzer, Irvine & Co. Sold in 1947 to Chellew Navigation Co. and renamed Pentire. Operated under the management of F. C. Perman. Management transferred to Baden H. Roberts in 1948. Sold in 1955 to Gaviota Compania de Navigation, Panama and renamed Cuaco. Sold in 1959 to Compania di Navigazione Gaviota, Lugano, remaining under the Panamanian flag. She was scrapped at Hirao in June 1963.

== Samnegros ==
Samnegros was built by Bethlehem Fairfield Shipyard. Her keel was laid on 11 May 1944. She was launched on 10 June and delivered on 22 June. To the MoWT under Lend-Lease. Operated under the management of George Nisbet & Co. Sold in 1947 to the Bank Line and renamed Titanbank. Operated under the management of Andrew Weir & Co. Sold in 1959 to Panamanian Oriental Steamship Corp. and renamed Lucina. Operated under the management of Wheelock, Marden & Co. Renamed Candy in 1962. Sold in 1964 to Alexandra Navigation Corp., remaining under the Panamanian flag and operated under the management of Eddie Steamship Corp. Sold in 1966 to Outerocean Navigation Corp. and renamed Yvonne. Reflagged to Taiwan, remaining under the same management. She was scrapped at Kaohsiung in May 1967.

== Samnesse ==
Samnesse was built by Bethlehem Fairfield Shipyard. Her keel was laid on 16 September 1943. She was launched as Simon B. Elliott on 9 October and completed as Samnesse on 18 October. To the MoWT under Lend-Lease. Operated under the management of A. Holt & Co. Sold in 1947 to China Mutual Steam Navigation Co. and renamed Eumaeus. Remaining under the same flag and management. Sold in 1952 to Glen Line Ltd. and renamed Glenshiel. Requisitioned by the MoT in 1956 for use as a storeship during the Suez Crisis. Sold in 1957 to China Mutual Steam Navigation Co. and renamed Euryades. Sold in 1961 to Bounty Shipping Co., Liverpool and renamed Marine Bounty. Operated under the management of Wheelock, Marsden & Co. Sold in 1962 to Prestige Shipping Co., Hong Kong, remaining under the same flag and management. Sold in 1964 to Mercury Shipping Co., Nassau, remaining under the British flag. She ran aground at Hasieshan, China (25°20′N 119°45′E) on 25 February 1966 whilst on a voyage from Chingwangtao, China to Singapore. She was refloated but ran aground again and broke in two and was a total loss.

== Samnethy ==
Samnnethy was built by Bethlehem Fairfield Shipyard. Her keel was laid on 27 January 1944. She was launched on 26 February and delivered on 10 March. To the MoWT under Lend-Lease. Operated under the management of E. R. Management Co. Returned to the USMC in 1948 and laid up at Mobile. She was scrapped there in March 1963.

== Samneva ==
Samneva was built by California Shipbuilding Corporation. Her keel was laid on 23 August 1943. She was launched as Henry M. Stanley on 14 September and delivered as Samneva on 27 September. To the MoWT under Lend-Lease. She was operated under the management of A. Holt & Co. Torpedoed and damaged in the English Channel (50°14′N 0°47′W) by U-309 on 24 July 1944 and was beached at Southampton, United Kingdom, where she broke in two. The stern section was scrapped at Briton Ferry, United Kingdom in June 1948. The bow section was scrapped at Netley.

== Samnid ==
Samnid was built by Bethlehem Fairfield Shipyard. Her keel was laid on 15 December 1943. She was launched on 10 June and delivered on 22 June. To the MoWT under Lend-Lease. Operated under the management of Blue Star Line. Sold to her managers in 1947 and renamed Pacific Star. Sold in 1951 to Lamport & Holt Line and renamed Lalande. Sold later that year to Società Anonima Importazione Carboni e Navigazione, Savona, Italy and renamed Ninfea. Sold in 1959 to China and renamed Nan Hai 147. Sold in 1973 to China Ocean Shipping Co. Renamed Hong Qi 147 c.1976. Deleted from Lloyd's Register in 1978 and had probably been scrapped by then.

== Samoa ==
Samoa was built by Bethlehem Fairfield Shipyard. Her keel was laid on 18 July 1943. She was launched as Matthew Brush on 14 August and delivered as Samoa on 23 August. To the MoWT under Lend-Lease. Operated under the management of A. Holt & Co. Sold in 1947 to China Mutual Steam Navigation Co. and renamed Eurymedon. Remaining under the same management. Sold in 1952 to Glen Line Ltd and renamed Glenlogan. Sold in 1957 to Blue Funnel Line and renamed Eurymedon. Operated under the management of A. Holt & Co. Sold in 1958 to Etolika Compania Navigation, Panama and renamed Angelos. Reflagged to Costa Rica and operated under the management of A. Luisi Ltd. Reflagged to Greece in 1959. Sold in 1964 to Michel A. Araktingi and renamed Mimosa. Re-registered to Lebanon and operated under the management of Midsutra Shipping Ltd. Sold in 1966 to Alplata Shipping Ltd. and renamed Alplata. Reflagged to Liberia and operated under the management of Flemar Ltd. Sold in 1967 to Maria de Lourdes Shipping Ltd. and renamed Anka. Reflagged to Cyprus and operated under the management of Carapanayoti & Co. Management transferred to Shipping & Produce Co. in 1968. She was scrapped at Bilbao in October 1971.

== Samoine ==
Samoine was built by Bethlehem Fairfield Shipyard. Her keel was laid on 11 October 1943. She was launched as Edward Bruce on 8 November and delivered as Samoine on 15 November. To the MoWT under Lend-Lease. Renamed Edward Bruce later that year and placed under the management of Stanley & John Thompson. To the USMC in 1947, laid up in the James River. She was scrapped at Kearny in September 1971.

== Samois ==
Samois was built by Bethlehem Fairfield Shipyard. Her keel was laid on 6 October 1943. She was launched as Samuel M. Ralston on 31 October and delivered as Samois on 8 November. To the MoWT under Lend-Lease. Operated under the management of Westcott & Laurence Line. Sold in 1947 to Ellerman Lines Ltd. and renamed City of Lichfield. Operated under the management of Ellerman & Bucknall Steamship Co. Management transferred to Hall Line Ltd. in 1951. She put in to Falmouth on fire on 12 January 1952 whilst on a voyage from Liverpool to Beira, Mozambique. Sold in 1959 to Panamanian Oriental Steamship Corp. and renamed Camerona. Operated under the management of Wheelock, Marden & Co. Sold in 1961 to Eddie Steamship Co., Taipei and renamed Chee Lee. Reflagged to China. Sold in 1962 to Far Eastern Navigation Corp., Taipei. Reflagged to Taiwan in 1965. She was scrapped at Kaohsiung in 1967.

== Samokla ==
Samokla was built by Bethlehem Fairfield Shipyard. Her keel was laid on 1 October 1943. She was launched as Jose Artigas on 23 October and delivered as Samokla on 27 October. To the MoWT under Lend-Lease. Operated under the management of Cayzer, Irvine & Co. Management transferred to Dene Shipping Co. in 1946. Returned to USMC in 1948. Officially renamed Jose Artigas but laid up at Wilmington, North Carolina as Samokla. She was scrapped at Newport News, Virginia in 1962.

== Samoland ==
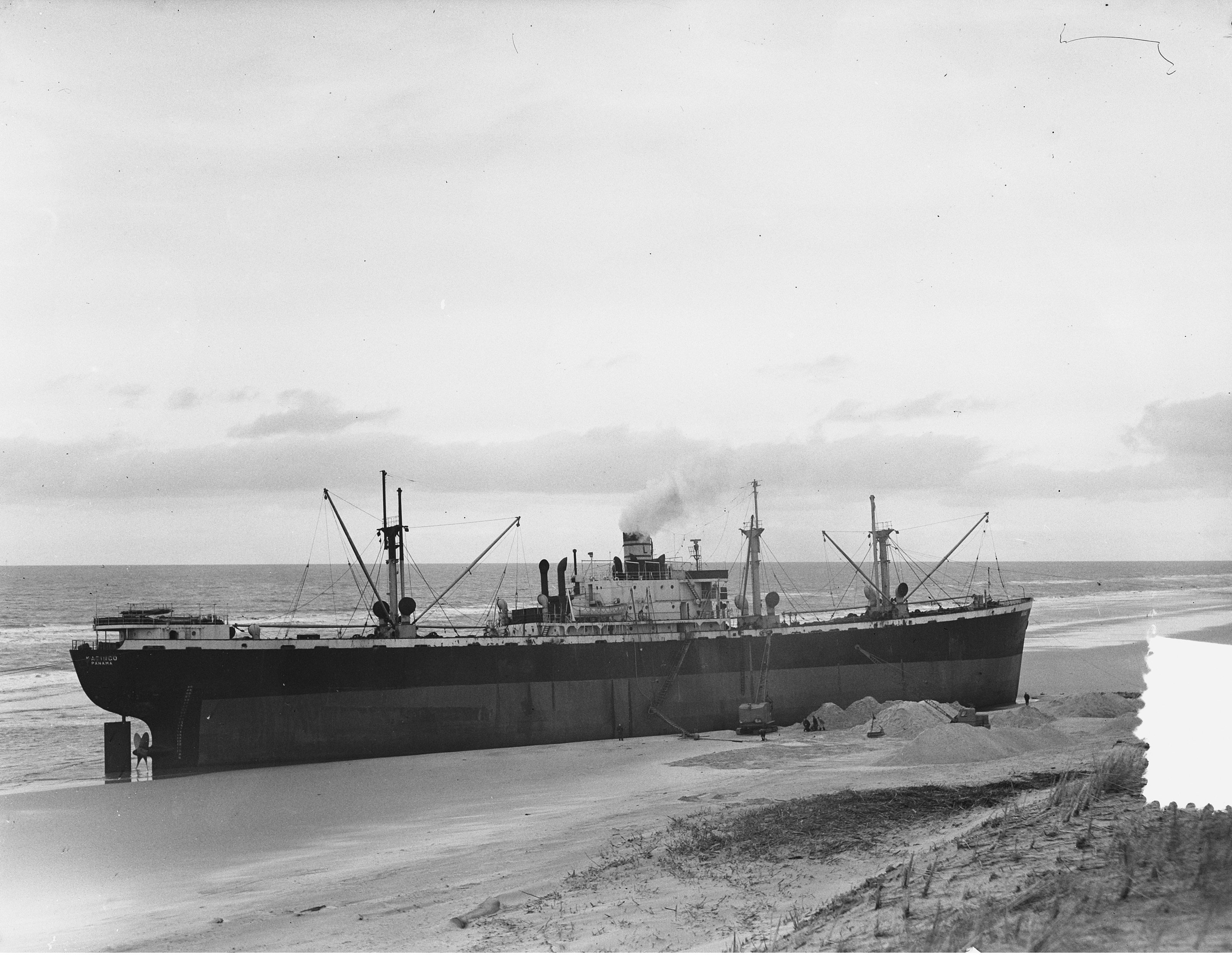
Katingo ashore at Bergen-op-Zoom

Samoland was built by J. A. Jones Construction Company, Brunswick. Her keel was laid on 10 April 1944. She was launched on 20 May and delivered on 9 June. To the MoWT under Lend-Lease. Operated under the management of Watts, Watts & Co. Sold in 1947 to Dover Navigation Co., Tring and renamed Sea Triumph. Sold in 1948 to Larrinaga Steamship Co. and renamed Asuncion de Larrinaga. Sold in 1951 to Compania de Navigation Carnation, Panama and renamed Katingo. Operated under the management of Lemos & Pateras. She ran aground off Bergen-op-Zoom, Netherlands on 22 December 1954 whilst on a voyage from Rotterdam, Netherland to Hamburg, West Germany. She was refloated on 19 February 1955. Although declared a constructive total loss, she was sold in 1955 to Compania de Navigation Virginia, Panama and renamed Virginia G.. Reflagged to Costa Rica, remaining under the same management. Sold in 1960 to Kapetanissa Navigatio Corp., Panama and renamed Kapetanissa. Reflagged to Lebanon, remaining under the same management. Sold in 1964 to Cathay Navigation Corp. Taipe and renamed National Strength. Reflagged to China. Reflagged to Taiwan in 1965. Sold in 1967 to Nationwide Communications Carriers Inc., New York and renamed Good Eddie. She arrived at Keelung for scrapping in April 1967. Sold later that year to Panamanian owners and renamed Escomdido. She was driven into the breakwater at Keelung on 29 June and was severely damaged. The sale was consequently cancelled and she reverted to her previous name. She was scrapped at Keelung in April 1968.

== Samora ==
Samora was built by Bethlehem Fairfield Shipyard. Her keel was laid on 5 August 1943. She was launched as John H. Hatton on 30 August and delivered as Samora on 7 September. Renamed Sampenn. To the MoWT under Lend-Lease. Operated under the management of Cayzer, Irvine & Co. Management transferred to C. Strubin & Co. in 1946. Returned to USMC in 1948 and laid up at Beaumont. She was scrapped at New Orleans in September 1966.

== Samore ==
Samore was built by Permanente Metals Corporation. Her keel was laid on 22 August 1943. She was launched as Charles Devens on 13 September and delivered as Samore on 21 September. To MoWT under Lend-Lease. Operated under the management of Ellerman's Wilson Line. Renamed Samdel in 1943. To USMC in 1947, officially renamed Charles Devens. Laid up in the James River still named Samdel. She was scrapped at Baltimore in February 1959.

== Samoresby ==
Samoresby was built by New England Shipbuilding Corporation. Her keel was laid on 8 March 1944. She was launched on 19 April and delivered on 30 April. To the MoWt under Lend-Lease. Operated under the management of B. & S. Shipping Co. Management transferred to Mungo, Campbell & Co. in 1946. Returned to the USMC in 1948, laid up at Wilmington, North Carolina. She was scrapped at Baltimore in January 1960.

== Samos ==
Samos was built by Bethlehem Fairfield Shipyard. Her keel was laid on 25 July 1943. She was launched as Tench Tilghman on 21 August and delivered as Samos on 30 August. To the MoWT under Lend-Lease. Operated under the management of Elder Dempster Lines. Sold to her managers in 1947 and renamed Zini. Sold in 1959 to Dorset Shipping Co. and renamed San Salvador. Reflagged to Liberia and operated under the management of Purvis Shipping Co. She was scrapped at La Spezia in December 1968.

== Samota ==
Samota was built by Bethlehem Fairfield Shipyard. Her keel was laid on 13 September 1943. She was launched as Adolph Lewisohn on 6 October and delivered as Samota on 13 October. To the MoWT under Lend-Lease. Operated under the management of Elder Dempster Lines. Sold to her managers in 1947 and renamed Zungeru. Sold in 1958 to Society Pacifica Marina, Panama and renamed Poros. Reflagged to Liberia and operated under the management of N. J. Goulandris. Sold in 1959 to Casa Blanca Shipping Corp., Liberia and placed under the management of Suwanee Steamship Co. Sold in 1966 to Marestela Compania Navigation, Panama and renamed Mery. Reflagged to Greece and operated under the management of Franco Shipping Co. Sold in 1968 to Toula Shipping Co., Cyprus, remaining under the same managers. She was scrapped at Avilés in October 1971.

== Samothrace ==
Samothrace was built by Bethlehem Fairfield Shipyard. Her keel was laid on 9 August 1943. She was launched as Orville P. Taylor on 3 September and delivered as Samothrace on 11 September. To the MoWT under Lend-Lease. Operated under the management of Pacific Steam Navigation Company, Liverpool. Sold to her managers in 1947 and renamed Talca. Sold in 1953 to Compania Navigation Aris, Panama and renamed Popi. Reflagged to Costa Rica and operated under the management of C. & E. Pateras. Reflagged to Greece in 1959. Sold in 1961 to Atlas Maritime Finance Corp., Panama and renamed Lydia. Reflagged to Lebanon and operated under the management of Lyras Bros. She was scrapped at Whampoa Dock, Hong Kong in July 1967.

== Samouri ==
Samouri was built by Oregon Shipbuilding Corporation. Her keel was laid on 12 September 1943. She was launched as Manasseh Cutler on 27 September and delivered as Samouri on 2 October. To the MoWT under Lend-Lease. Operated under the management of Moss Line. She was torpedoed and sunk in the Gulf of Aden (13°13′N 55°56′E) by U-188 on 26 January 1944 whilst on a voyage from Bombay to New York.

== Samouse ==
Samouse was built by Bethlehem Fairfield Shipyard. Her keel was laid on 17 December 1943. She was launched on 17 January 1944 and completed on 26 January. To the MoWT under Lend-Lease. Operated under the management of Cunard White Star Line Ltd. Sold in 1947 to The Bank Line Ltd and renamed Marabank. Operated under the management of Andrew Weir & Co. Sold in 1960 to Febo Amedeo Bertorello fu Giacomo, Genoa and renamed Ruscin. Sold in 1960 to Seatide Shipping Co., Lugano and renamed Whitehorse. Reflagged to Liberia. She was scrapped at Split in June 1969.

== Samovar ==
Samovar was built by Permanente Metals Corporation. Her keel was laid on 28 June 1943. She was launched as Frank D. Phinney on 21 July and delivered as Samovar on 28 July. To the MoWT under Lend-Lease. Operated under the management of T. & J. Brocklebank. On 9 September, whilst on her maiden voyage, she discovered the British tanker Trocas, which had suffered an engine room fire and was disabled in the Pacific Ocean. Samovar towed her 1,284 nautical miles (2,378 km) to Auckland, New Zealand. The two ships arrived on 27 September. Sold in 1946 to British & Burmese Steam Navigation Co. and renamed Kansi. Operated under the management of P. Hendersonn & Co. Sold in 1949 to Charente Steamship Co. and renamed Colonial. Operated under the management of T. & J. Harrison Ltd. Renamed Planter in 1961. Sold in 1962 to Jayanti Shipping Co., London & Bombay and renamed Gargi Jayanti. Reflagged to India. Sold in 1967 to Pent-Ocean Steamship Ltd. Sold in 1968 to Shipping Corporation of India and renamed Samudra Jyoti. She was scrapped at Bombay in February 1972.

== Sampa ==
Sampa was built by Bethlehem Fairfield Shipyard. Her keel was laid on 31 July 1943. She was launched as William Smallwood on 28 August and delivered as Sampa on 6 September. To the MoWT under Lend-Lease. Operated under the management of Houlder Bros. She struck a mine and sank 9 nautical miles (17 km) north of Ostend, Belgium (51°24′N 2°53′E) on 27 February 1945. The wreck was dispersed in September 1962.

== Sampan ==
Sampan was built by California Shipbuilding Corporation. Her keel was on 12 July 1943. She was launched as William I. Kip on 4 August and delivered as Sampan on 17 August. to the MoWT under Lend-Lease. Operated under the management of Union-Castle Steamship Co. Returned to USMC in 1947. Renamed William I. Kip and laid up at Mobile. She was scrapped at New Orleans in May 1962.

== Sampep ==
Sampep was built by California Shipbuilding Corporation. Her keel was laid on 24 July 1943. She was launched as Victor F. Lawson on 17 August and delivered as Sampep on 31 August. To the MoWT under Lend-Lease. Operated under the management of Houlder Bros. & Co. Returned to USMC in 1948. Officially renamed Victor F. Lawson, but laid up at Astoria, Oregon as Sampep. She was scrapped at Portland, Oregon in April 1969.

== Sampford ==
Sampford was built by Permanente Metals Corporation. Her keel was laid on 7 August 1943. She was launched as John Reed on 31 August and delivered as Sampford on 12 September. To the MoWT under Lend-Lease. Operated under the management of Andrew Weir & Co. Sold in 1947 to The Bank Line Ltd. and renamed Rowanbank, remaining under the same management. Sold in 1959 to Taiship Co. Ltd, Hong Kong and renamed Taiwind. Remaining under the British flag. Sold in 1962 to Northwind Navigation Co., Panama. Operated under the management of her previous owner. Collided with the tanker St. Matthew 8 nautical miles (15 km) east of Irosaki, Japan (34°33′N 139°01′E) on 25 July 1966 whilst on a voyage from Chiba to Wakamatsu, Japan and was holed. She was towed to Uraga and declared a constructive total loss. She was scrapped at Yokosuka in January 1967.

== Samphill ==
Samphill was built by New England Shipbuilding Corporation. Her keel was laid on 15 September 1943. She was launched as Barrett Wendell on 5 November and delivered as Samphill on 15 November. To the MoWT under Lend-Lease. Operated under the management of Royal Mail Lines, London. Sold to her managers in 1947 and renamed Berbice. Sold in 1958 to Mareante Compania Navigation, Panama and renamed Nikolas S. Operated under the management of G. Lemos Bros. Sold in 1961 to Compania Navigation Aisinicolas. Reflagged to Lebanon, remaining under the same management. She was scrapped at Kaohsiung in March 1967.

== Samphire ==
Samphire was built by North Carolina Shipbuilding Company. Her keel was laid on 16 July 1943. She was launched as Montfort Stokes on 14 August and delivered as Samphire on 22 August. To the MoWT under Lend-Lease, operated under the management of P. Henderson & Co. Returned to USMC in 1947 and officially renamed Montfort Stokes, Laid up at Mobile bearing name Samphire. She was scrapped at Chickasaw, Alabama in April 1962.

== Sampler ==
Sampler was built by Oregon Shipbuilding Corporation. Her keel was laid on 23 June 1943. She was launched as William C. Lane on 13 July and delivered as Sampler on 20 July. To the MoWT under Lend-Lease. Operated under the management of Port Line Ltd. Sold to her managers in 1947 and renamed Fort Albany. Sold in 1951 to Compania Navigation Vista Darada, Panama and renamed Teni. Operated under the management of Capeside Steamship Co. Sold in 1953 to Mid-Atlantic Shipping Corp. and renamed Gloriana. Reflagged to Liberia and operated under the management of J. Livanos & Sons. Reflagged to Greece in 1959. Management transferred to General Maritime Agency in 1960. She was scrapped at Shanghai in September 1968.

== Samport ==
Samport was built by Bethlehem Fairfield Shipyard. Her keel was laid on 14 November 1943. She was launched at Israel Wheelen on 6 December and delivered as Samport on 14 December. To the MoWT under Lend-Lease. Operated under the management of Cayzer, Irvine & Co. Management transferred to Maclay & McIntyre Ltd. in 1947. Returned to the USMC in 1947. Officially renamed Israel Wheeler but laid up at Mobile bearing the name Samport. She was scrapped at Panama City, Florida in November 1962.

== Samrich ==
Samrich was built by New England Shipbuilding Corporation. Her keel was laid on 15 September 1943. She was launched as William Pitt Preble on 5 November 1943 and delivered as Samrich on 20 November. To the MoWT under Lend-Lease. Operated under the management of Shaw, Savill & Albion Co., London. She collided with the British refrigerated cargo ship Otranto off Gravesend on 12 February 1947. Sold to her managers in 1947 and renamed Cufic. Sold in 1953 to Società Officine G. Malvicini Vapori, Genoa and renamed Santa Elisabetta. Sold in 1967 to Bluestar Enterprises Inc. and renamed Star. Reflagged to Panama and operated under the management of Victoria Steamship Co. She was scrapped at Kaohsiung in May 1968.

== Samsacola ==
Samsacola was built by Bethlehem Fairfield Shipyard. Her keel was laid on 26 November 1943. She was launched as Melvil Dewey on 18 December and delivered as Samsacola on 29 December. To the MoWT under Lend-Lease. Operated under the management of S. & J. Thompson Ltd. Sold in 1947 to Silver Line Ltd., London and renamed Sivercedar. Sold in 1949 to William Thompson & Co., Edinburgh and renamed Benwyvis. She collided with the Spanish steamship Guecho in the English Channel 4 nautical miles (7.4 km) south east of Dover, United Kingdom on 21 March 1952. Sold in 1955 to Rio del Castro Compania Armamente, Panama and renamed Linda. Reflagged to Liberia and operated under the management of Global Shipping Co. Sold in 1958 to District Shipping Co., Panama and renamed Agia Irene. Remaining under the Liberian flag and operated under the management of Triton Shipping Co. Reflagged to Greece in 1961. Management transferred to Dynamic Shipping Co. in 1962. Sold in 1965 to Transocean Shipping Corp. and renamed Angelina. Remaining under the Liberian flag and operated under the management of Universal Marine Service Co. She caught fire 85 nautical miles (157 km) east north east of Madras, India (14°00′N 81°26′E) on 31 July 1967 whilst on a voyage from Vishakpatnam to Madras and was abandoned. She was towed in to Madras on 4 August. Subsequently towed to Singapore, where she was declared a constructive total loss. She was scrapped there.

== Samselbu ==
Samselbu was built by J. A. Jones Construction Company, Brunswick. Her keel was laid on 1 March 1944. She was launched on 16 April and delivered on 26 April. To the MoWT, operated under the management of W. Runciman & Co. She struck a mine and sank off Blankenberge, Belgium (51°23′N 3°06′E) on 19 March 1945 whilst on a voyage from Antwerp to the River Thames.

== Samsette ==
Samsette was built by Bethlehem Fairfield Shipyard. Her keel was laid on 9 October 1943. She was launched on as Augustine Herman 5 November and delivered as Samsette on 12 November. To the MoWT under Lend-Lease. Operated under the management of A. Holt & Co. Sold in 1947 to China Mutual Steam Navigation Co., Liverpool and renamed Eurypylus, remaining under the same management. Sold in 1951 to Glen Line Ltd., Liverpool and renamed Pembrokeshire. Sold in 1957 to Ocean Steamship Co., Liverpool and renamed Eurypylus. Operated under the management of A. Holt & Co. Sold in 1960 to Federal Shipping Co., Hong Kong and renamed Kota Bahru, remaining under the British flag. Sold in 1966 to Cresta Shipping Co., Panama and renamed Cresta. Operated under the management of Gibson Shipping Co. She was scrapped at Kaohsiung in February 1968.

== Samshee ==
Samshee was built by Bethlehem Fairfield Shipyard. Her keel was laid on 8 February 1944. She was launched on 9 March and delivered on 21 March. To the MoWT under Lend-Lease. Operated under the management of Hain Steamship Co. Management transferred to W. H. Seager & Co. in 1948. Returned to the USMC in 1948. Laid up at Beaumont. She was scrapped at New Orleans in August 1964.

== Samsip ==
Samsip was built by Bethlehem Fairfield Shipyard. Her keel was laid on 8 October 1943. She was launched as Edwin A. Robinson on 1 November and delivered as Samsip on 9 November. To the MoWT under Lend-Lease. Operated under the management of New Zealand Shipping Company] Struck a mine in the Scheldt off Blankenberge on 7 December 1944. She was scuttled by Allied warships.

== Samskern ==
Samskern was built by Bethlehem Fairfiled Shipyard. Her keel was laid on 5 May 1944. She was launched on 3 June and delivered on 13 June. To the MoWT under Lend-Lease. Operated under the management of Evan Thomas, Radcliffe & Co. Sold in 1947 to Stanhope Steamship Co. and renamed Stanthorpe. Operated under the management of J. A. Billmeier & Co. Sold in 1949 to Larrinaga Steamship Co. and renamed Domingo de Larrinaga. Sold in 1955 to Compania Navigation Aivali, Panama and renamed Vassilis. Reflagged to Costa Rica and operated under the management of Embiricos Ltd. Reflagged to Liberia in 1958. Sold in 1959 to Compania de Navigation Guaca, Panama and renamed Katina. Reflagged to Greece, remaining under the same management. Sold in 1963 to Tarsiano Compania de Navigation, Panama and renamed Anastassia. Reflagged to Panama, remaining under the same management. She ran aground off Constanţa, Romania on 6 January 1969 whilst on a voyage from Alexandria to Constanţa. She was declared a total loss.

== Samsmola ==
Samsmola was built by New England Shipbuilding Corporation. Her keel was laid on 6 April 1944. She was launched on 20 May and delivered on 27 May. To the MoWT under Lend-Lease. Operated under the management of Ellerman's Wilson Line. Returned to the USMC in 1947 and laid up at Mobile. She was scrapped at Oakland in January 1968.

== Samsoaring ==
Samsoaring was built by Bethlehem Fairfield Shipyard. Her keel was laid on 31 March 1944. She was launched on 2 May and delivered on 29 May. Whilst undergoing fitting out, an explosion in her engine room severely damaged her and caused a severe list. She was righted, repaired and entered service. To the MoWT under Lend-Lease. Operated under the management of P & O Steam Navigation Co. She developed a severe list off the coast of Pennsylvania during one wartime voyage. Severely damaged during a wartime convoy when she grounded in the Outer Dowsing Sandbanks. She was under repair when the war ended. Sold in 1947 to British Empire Steam Navigation Co. and renamed Fraser River. Operated under the management of Houlder Bros. Ltd. Sold in 1952 to Bemonte Compania Navigation, Panama and renamed North Princess. Operated under the management of Freighter & Tankers Agency. Sold in 1959 to Ermis Maritime Corp. and renamed Georgios. Remaining under the Panamanian flag and operated under the management of George Andreadis. Sold in 1960 to St. Ioannis Shipping Corp. and renamed Ioannis K.. Reflagged to Greece and operated under the management of Ceres Shipping Co. Management transferred to N. & J. Vassopulos in 1961, then to Palmco Shipping Inc. in 1962. She ran aground at Vung Tau, Vietnam (10°14′N 107°05′E) on 3 January 1968 whilst on a voyage from Saigon to Singapore. She was scrapped in Vietnam in 1973.

== Samson ==
Samson was built by California Shipbuilding Corporation. Her keel was laid on 12 June 1943. She was launched as John J. Ingalls on 8 July and delivered as Samson on 20 July. To the MoWT under Lend-Lease. Operated under the management of Cunard White Star Line. Returned to USMC in 1948. Officially renamed John J. Ingalls and laid up at Beaumont as Samson. She was scrapped at Orange in June 1961.

== Samson Occum ==
Samson Occum was built by California Shipbuilding Corporation. Her keel was laid on 9 August 1943. She was launched as Samson Occum on 31 August and delivered as Samarinda on 17 September. To the MoWT under Lend-Lease. Operated under the management of T. & J. Harrison. Sold in 1947 to Charente Steamship Co., Liverpool and renamed Student. Remaining under the management of T. & J. Harrison. Sold in 1963 to Parthenon Shipping Corp. and renamed Parthenon. Reflagged to Liberia and operated under the management of Transmarine Shipping Agencies. Sold in 1964 to Michael A. Araktingi and renamed Al Amin. Reflagged to Lebanon and operated under the management of Midsutra Shipping Ltd. Sold in 1966 to Iona Shipping Co., Panama and renamed Fortune Sea. Reflagged to Panama and operated under the management of South East Asia Shipping & Trading Co. She was scrapped at Kaohsiung in April 1967.

== Samspeed ==
Samspeed was built by Bethlehem Fairfield Shipyard. Her keel was laid on 22 April 1944. She was launched on 22 May and delivered on 3 June. To the MoWT under Lend-Lease. Operated under the management of Lyle Shipping Co. Sold in 1947 to Cape York Motorship Co. and renamed Cape York, remaining under the same management. Sold in 1952 to Nettuna Società Siciliana di Navigazione and renamed Paestum. Reflagged to Italy and operated under the management of D'Amico Società di Navigazione. She developed a leak in July 1966 whilst on a voyage from Boca Grande, Venezuela to Catania, Sicily. She put in to Charleston, South Carolina, then sailed for Norfolk, Virginia for repairs. She was abandoned on 10 July and sank the next day.

== Samspelga ==
Samspelga built by Bethlehem Fairfield Shipyard. Her keel was laid on 15 February 1944. She was launched on 16 March and delivered on 25 March. To the MoWT under Lend-Lease. Operated under the management of J. Morrison & Son. Sold in 1947 to The Bank Line and renamed Springbank. Operated under the management of Andrew Weir & Co. Sold in 1958 to Canton Shipping Co. and renamed Nan Hai 142. Reflagged to China. Sold in 1973 to China Ocean Shipping Co. Renamed Hong Qi 142 in 1976. Probably scrapped in 1977.

== Samsperrin ==
Samsperrin was built by New England Shipbuilding Corporation. Her keel was laid on 14 January 1944. She was launched on 7 March and delivered on 18 March. To the MoWT under Lend-Lease. Operated under the management of Hain Steamship Co. Returned to the USMC in 1947 and laid up at Mobile. She was scrapped at Panama City, Florida in November 1961.

== Samspring ==
Samspring was built by New England Shipbuilding Corporation. Her keel was laid on 20 October 1943. She was launched as Charles A. Young on 3 December and delivered as Samspring on 16 December. To MoWT under Lend-Lease, she was operated under the management of Royal Mail Lines. Sold to her managers in 1947 and renamed Beresina. Sold in 1956 to West Africa Navigation Co. Ltd and renamed African Monarch. Reflagged to Liberia and operated under the management of T. J. Verrando & Co. Sold in 1959 to General Navigation Co. of Monrovia, remaining under the same management. Management transferred to Transamerican Steamship Co. in 1963. She was scrapped at Split in November 1969.

== Samsteel ==
Samsteel was built by California Shipbuilding Corporation. Her keel was laid on 11 July 1943. She was launched as James H. Robinson on 31 July and delivered as Samsteel on 15 August. To the MoWT under Lend-Lease. Operated under the management of Union-Castle Mail Steamship Co. Returned to USMC in 1947, officially renamed James H. Robinson. Laid up at Mobile as Samsteel. She was scrapped at Panama City, Florida in December 1961.

== Samstrae ==
Samstrae was built by New England Shipbuilding Corporation. Her keel was laid on 21 December 1943. She was launched on 16 February 1944 and delivered on 29 February. To the MoWT under Lend-Lease. Operated under the management of Headlam & Son. Sold in 1947 to Rowland & Marwood's Steamship Co. and renamed Sneaton, remaining under the same management. Requisitioned by the MoT in 1956 for use as a storeship during the Suez Crisis. She was scrapped at Shanghai in August 1967.

== Samstrule ==
Samstrule was built by Bethlehem Fairfield Shipyard. Her keel was laid on 10 January 1944. She was launched on 5 February and delivered on 16 February. To the MoWT under Lend-Lease. Operated under the management of Elders & Fyffes Ltd. Sold in 1947 to Henry M. Thompson and renamed Artemisia. Operated under the management of Charles C. Arnell & Co. Sold in 1956 to Compania Comercial y Financiera Sudamericana, Panama and renamed Allergia S. Operated under the management of Runciman Ltd. Reflagged to Lebanon in 1962 and placed under the joint management of Bassani SpA and W. Runciman Ltd. Sold in 1966 to Euros Shipping Co. Ltd. and renamed Marina. Reflagged to Panama and operated under the management of Internacional de Comercio y Navigation. Reflagged to Somalia in 1969. She was scrapped at Shanghai in March 1970.

== Samsturdy ==
Samsturdy was built by Bethlehem Fairfield Shipyard. Her keel was laid on 29 February 1944. She was launched on 31 March and delivered on 14 April. To the MoWT under Lend-Lease. Operated under the management of Common Bros. Ltd. Sold in 1947 to Hindustan Steamship Co. and renamed Baluchistan, remaining under the same management. Sold in 1953 to Louis Dreyfus & Co. and renamed La Loma. Operated under the management of Buries Markes Ltd. sold in 1958 to Zoodochos Compania Navigation, Panama and renamed Angelic Force. Reflagged to Costa Rica and operated under the management of A. Lusi Ltd. Renamed Dynamis and reflagged to Greece later that year. Management transferred to Kronos Shipping Ltd. in 1963. She was scrapped at Osaka in November 1966.

== Samsurf ==
Samsurf was built by California Shipbuilding Corporation. Her keel was laid on 28 June 1943. She was launched as Cornelius Cole on 22 July and delivered as Samsurf on 5 August. To MoWT under Lend-Lease. Operated under the management of Cunard White Star Line. Returned to USMC in 1947, officially renamed Cornelius Cole. Laid up at Mobile still bearing name Samsurf. She was scrapped at Mobile in April 1961.

== Samsuva ==
Samsuva was built by New England Shipbuilding Corporation. Her keel was laid on 21 March 1944. She was launched on 6 May and delivered on 13 May. To the MoWT under Lend-Lease. Operated under the management of Sir R. Ropner & Co. She was torpedoed and sunk off North Cape, Norway (72°58′N 23°59′E) by U-310 on 29 September 1944 whilst on a voyage from the Kola Inlet to Loch Ewe.

== Samsylarna ==
Samsylarna was built by Bethlehem Fairfield Shipyard. Her keel was laid on 8 May 1944. She was launched on 10 June and delivered on 24 June. To the MoWT under Lend-Lease. Operated under the management of Sir R. Ropner & Co. Severely damaged by an aerial torpedo when Convoy UGS 48 was attacked in the Mediterranean Sea 40 nautical miles (74 km) north of Benghazi, Libya on 4 August 1944. A request to scuttle her was refused as she was carrying a cargo of 7,600 American silver bars. She was taken in tow on 7 August by the tug Brigand and was beached at Benghazi. Refloated on 24 August and towed to Tobruk. following temporary repairs, she was refloated in late September and towed to Alexandria and beached. Returned to the USMC in 1949. Sold in 1951 to Società di Navigazione Tito Campanella, Genoa and renamed Tito Campanella. Repaired at Genoa and returned to service. Sold in 1961 to the Polish Government and renamed Huta Sosnowiec. Operated under the management of Polska Żegluga Morska. She was scrapped at Bilbao in October 1971.

== Samsylvan ==
Samsylvan was built by Bethlehem Fairfield Shipyard. Her keel was laid on 25 September 1943. She was launched as J. Whitridge Williams on 17 October and delivered as Samsylvan on 27 October. To the MoWT under Lend-Lease. Operated under the management of Shaw, Savill & Albion Co. Sold to her managers in 1947 and renamed Tropic. Sold in 1952 to San Francesco Società di Navigazione, Genoa and renamed San Francesco. Operated under the management of Angelo Scinicariello. She ran aground near Hainan Island, China on 30 January 1960 whilst on a voyage from Whampoa Dock to Yulin, China. She was refloated and sold for scrapping. She foundered in a typhoon at Hong Kong on 9 June 1960. Subsequently refloated and scrapped.

== Samtampa ==
Samtampa was built by New England Shipbuilding Corporation. Her keel was laid on 1 November 1943. She was launched as Peleg Wadsworth on 12 December and delivered as Samtampa on 22 December. To the MoWT under Lend-Lease, operated under the management of Houlder Line. She ran aground and was wrecked at Sker Point on 23 April 1947 whilst on a voyage from Middlesbrough to Newport, United Kingdom.

== Samtana ==
Samtana was built by Bethlehem Fairfield Shipyard. Her keel was laid on 2 May 1944. She was launched on 30 May and delivered on 9 June. To the MoWT under Lend-Lease, operated under the management of Lyle Shipping Co., Glasgow. Sold to her managers in 1947 and renamed Cape Verde. Sold in 1957 to West Africa Navigation Ltd. and renamed African Night. Reflagged to Liberia and operated under the management of T. J. Verrando & Co. Sold in 1959 to General Navigation Ltd., Monrovia, remaining under the same management. Management transferred to Transamerican Steamship Corp. in 1963. She was scrapped at Kaohsiung in October 1967.

== Samtay ==
Samtay was built by Bethlehem Fairfield Shipyard. Her keel was laid on 13 December 1943. She was launched on 10 January 1944 and delivered on 20 January. To the MoWT under Lend-Lease. Operated under the management of Blue Star Line. Sold in 1947 to Ropner Shipping Co. and renamed Rudby. Operated under the management of Sir R. Ropner & Co. Sold in 1952 to Compania Thekla Transmarina, Panama and renamed Thekla. Operated under the management of Pan-Range Ship Operating Co. Sold in 1954 to Esperanza Compania Navigation, Panama and renamed Adamas. Operated under the management of George Frangistas. Management transferred to Carras Ltd. in 1955, then Interocean Tramping Ltd. in 1961 and back to Carras Ltd in 1965. She was scrapped at Sakaide in December 1968.

== Samteviot ==
Samteviot was built by New England Shipbuilding Corporation. Her keel was laid on 8 December 1943. She was launched on 28 January 1944 and delivered on 11 February. To the MoWT under Lend-Lease. Operated under the management of Trinder, Anderson & Co. Returned to USMC in 1947 and laid up in the James River. She was scrapped at Baltimore in February 1961.

== Samthar ==
Samthar was built by Oregon Shipbuilding Corporation. Her keel was laid on 10 August 1943. She was launched as Charles A. Broadwater on 29 August and delivered as Samthar on 9 September. To the MoWT under Lend-Lease. Operated under the management of Royal Mail Lines. Sold to her managers in 1947 and renamed Barranca. Sold in 1956 to Corrado Società di Navigazione, Genoa and renamed Cesco Corrado. She was scrapped at La Spezia in July 1967.

== Samtorch ==
Samtorch was built by Bethlehem Fairfield Shipyard. Her keel was laid on 14 April 1944. She was launched on 17 May and delivered on 31 May. To the MoWT under Lend-Lease. Operated under the management of Ellerman & Papayanni Lines. Sold in 1947 to Ellerman Lines Ltd. and renamed City of Stafford. Operated under the management of Ellerman & Bucknall Steamship Co. Sold in 1961 to Stuart Navigation Co., Nassau and renamed Kuniang. Remaining under the British flag. Sold in 1962 to Sygiamore Steamship Co., London, then sold later that year to Sycamore Steamship Co., Hong Kong. Remaining under the British flag and operated under the management of Wheelock, Marden & Co. Management transferred to World-Wide Shipping Ltd. in 1963. Sold in 1965 to Jupiter Shipping Co., Hong Kong. Remained under the same flag and management. Sold in 1966 to Trefoil Navigation Inc. and renamed Prospect. Reflagged to Liberia and operated under the management of Venders Navigation Co. She was scrapped at Kaohsiung in April 1967

== Samtredy ==
Samtredy was built by California Shipbuilding Corporation. Her keel was laid on 17 August 1943. She was launched as John Tipton on 8 September and delivered as Samtredy on 21 September. To the MoWT under Lend-Lease, operated under the management of Prince Line Ltd. Sold in 1947 to Furness, Withy & Co. and renamed Pacific Importer. Sold in 1953 to Ditta Luigi Pittaluga Vapori, Genoa and renamed Aquitania. Sold in 1965 to Akrotiri Steamship Corp. and renamed Ayia Marina. Reflagged to Liberia and operated under the management of Cape Shipping Ltd. She was laid up at Rio de Janeiro in 1968. Arrested for debts in 1969, she was sold to shipbreakers at Rio de Janeiro in December 1969.

== Samtrent ==
Samtrent was built by New England Shipbuilding Corporation. Her keel was laid on 11 October 1943. She was launched as Percy D. Haughton on 24 November and delivered as Samtrent on 30 November. To the MoWT under Lend-Lease. Operated under the management of Union-Castle Mail Steamship Co. Returned to the USMC in 1947 and laid up at Mobile. She was scrapped there in April 1967.

== Samtroy ==
Samtroy was built by Bethlehem Fairfield Shipyard. Her keel was laid on 6 November 1943. She was launched at Ross G. Marvin on 29 November and delivered as Samtroy on 7 December. To the MoWT under Lend-Lease. Operated under the management of Andrew Weir & Co. Sold in 1946 to Bank Line and renamed Edenbank, remaining under the same management. To China in 1960 and renamed Hoping Ssu Shi San. Renamed Dan Zhou 43 in 1967. Sold in 1973 to China Ocean Shipping Co. Reported to have been scrapped in 1987.

== Samtrusty ==
Samtrusty was built by Bethlehem Fairfield Shipyard. Her keel was laid on 9 March 1944. She was launched on 10 April and delivered on 23 April. To the MoWT under Lend-Lease. Operated under the management of Donaldson Bros. & Black. Sold in 1947 to Donaldson Line Ltd. and renamed Lakonia, remaining under the same management. She collided with the Dutch ship Pieters off Swansea in September 1955. Sold in 1962 to Compania de Navigation Somerset, Panama and renamed Sangaetano. Reflagged to Liberia. She was scrapped at Blyth, United Kingdom in June 1972.

== Samtruth ==
Samtruth was built by Bethlehem Fairfield Shipyard. Her keel was laid on 10 April 1944. She was launched on 12 May and delivered on 23 May. To the MoWT under Lend-Lease. Operated under the management of Haldin & Phillips. Returned to the USMC in 1948. Sold later that year to Honduras Shipping Co. Tegucigalpa. Sold in 1950 to Diamond Freighters Corp., Panama and renamed Aspirator. Reflagged to Liberia and operated under the management of D. Pateras. Sold in 1960 to Jugoslovenska Slobodna Plovidba, Ploče, Yugoslavia and renamed Ploče. Placed under the management of Slobodna Plovidba in 1963. She was scrapped at Split in January 1975.

== Samtucky ==
Samtucky was built by New England Shipbuilding Corporation. Her keel was laid on 1 September 1943. She was launched as William Blackstone on 19 October and delivered as Samtucky on 30 October. To the MoWT under Lend-Lease. Operated under the management of Prince Line Ltd. Returned to USMC in 1948 and officially renamed William Blackstone. Laid up at Mobile as Samtucky. She was scrapped at Panama City, Florida in February 1962.

== Samtweed ==
Samtweed was built by Bethlehem Fairfield Shipyard. Her keel was laid on 30 November 1943. She was launched as William R. Cox on 21 December and delivered as Samtweed on 30 December. To the MoWT under Lend-Lease. Operated under the management of Hall Line Ltd. Sold in 1947 to Ellerman Lines Ltd. and renamed City of Newport, remaining under the same management. Sold in 1961 to Veritas Shipping Corp. and renamed Istrios II. Reflagged to Greece and operated under the management of N. & J. Vlassopulos. She was scrapped at Trieste, Italy in April 1967.

== Samtyne ==
Samtyne was built by New England Shipbuilding Corporation. Her keel was laid on 21 December 1944. She was launched on 15 February 1944 and delivered on 25 February. To the MoWT under Lend-Lease. Operated under the management of Royal Mail Lines Ltd. Sold in 1947 to Houlder Line Ltd. and renamed Argentine Transport. Operated under the management of Houlder Bros. & Co. Sold in 1949 to Empire Transport Co., remaining under the same flag and management. Sold in 1958 to South Atlantic Shipping Corp. and renamed Archandros. Reflagged to Liberia and operated under the management of Ocean Shipbrokerage Co. Sold in 1967 to Third Shipping Corp. and renamed Zephyr. Remaining under the Liberian flag and operated under the management of Scio Shipping Inc. She was scrapped at Hirao in December 1968.
