= SS Samlorian =

Liberty ship built during WW2 in United States

History

United States
- Name: Samlorian
- Ordered: as type (EC2-S-C1) hull, MC hull 2358
- Builder: J.A. Jones Construction, Brunswick, Georgia
- Cost: $1,034,152
- Yard number: 143
- Way number: 3
- Laid down: 1 April 1944
- Launched: 14 May 1944
- Sponsored by: Mrs. A.M. Harris
- Completed: 26 May 1944
- Fate: Transferred to the British Ministry of War Transport upon completion.

United Kingdom
- Name: Samlorian
- Operator: E.R. Management Co.
- Acquired: 26 May 1944
- Identification: Call Signal: GSWL
- Fate: Sold to Strath Steamship Co., 21 April 1947; Scrapped, 1966

General characteristics
- Class & type: Liberty ship; type EC2-S-C1, standard
- Tonnage: 10,865 LT DWT; 7,176 GRT
- Displacement: 3,380 long tons (3,434 t) (light); 14,245 long tons (14,474 t) (max)
- Length: 441 feet 6 inches (135 m) oa; 416 feet (127 m) pp; 427 feet (130 m) lwl
- Beam: 57 feet (17 m)
- Draft: 27 ft 9.25 in (8.4646 m)
- Installed power: 2 × Oil fired 450 °F (232 °C) boilers, operating at 220 psi (1,500 kPa); 2,500 hp (1,900 kW)
- Propulsion: 1 × triple-expansion steam engine, (manufactured by Joshua Hendy Iron Works, Sunnyvale, California); 1 × screw propeller
- Speed: 11.5 knots (21.3 km/h; 13.2 mph)
- Capacity: 562,608 cubic feet (15,931 m^{3}) (grain); 499,573 cubic feet (14,146 m^{3}) (bale)
- Complement: 38–62 USMM; 21–40 USNAG
- Armament: Varied by ship; Bow-mounted 3-inch (76 mm)/50-caliber gun; Stern-mounted 4-inch (102 mm)/50-caliber gun; 2–8 × single 20-millimeter (0.79 in) Oerlikon anti-aircraft (AA) cannons and/or, 2–8 × 37-millimeter (1.46 in) M1 AA guns

SS Samlorian was a Liberty ship built in the United States during World War II. She was transferred to the British Ministry of War Transportation (MoWT) upon completion.

== Construction ==
Samlorian was laid down on 1 April 1944, under a United States Maritime Commission (MARCOM) contract, MC hull 2358, by J.A. Jones Construction, Brunswick, Georgia; sponsored by Mrs. A.M. Harris, and launched on 14 May 1944.

== History ==
She was allocated to E.R. Management Co., on 26 May 1944. On 20 June 1947, she was sold to the Strath Steamship Co., for commercial use. She was scrapped in 1966.

== Bibliography ==
- "Jones Construction, Brunswick GA". ShipbuildingHistory.com. 13 October 2010.
- "Liberty Ships – World War II".
- Maritime Administration. "Samlorian". Ship History Database Vessel Status Card. U.S. Department of Transportation, Maritime Administration. Archived from the original on 12 December 2019.
- Davies, James (May 2004). "Specifications (As-Built)" (PDF). p. 23.
- "SS Samlorian".
