= SS Samingoy =

World War II Liberty ship of the United States

History

United States
- Name: Samingoy
- Ordered: as type (EC2-S-C1) hull, MC hull 2357
- Builder: J.A. Jones Construction, Brunswick, Georgia
- Cost: $1,028,716
- Yard number: 142
- Way number: 2
- Laid down: 24 March 1944
- Launched: 30 April 1944
- Sponsored by: Mrs. Parks M. King
- Completed: 13 May 1944
- Fate: Transferred to the British Ministry of War Transport upon completion.

United Kingdom
- Name: Samingoy
- Operator: New Zealand Shipping Co., London
- Acquired: 13 May 1944
- Identification: Call Signal: GSVX
- Fate: Sold to Federal Steam Navigation Co., Ltd., 20 June 1947

United Kingdom
- Name: Stafford
- Operator: Federal S. N. Co., London
- Acquired: 20 June 1947
- Fate: Sold, 1950

United Kingdom
- Name: Bimini
- Namesake: Bimini
- Operator: Nassau Maritime Co., Nassau, Bahamas
- Acquired: 1950
- Fate: Sold, 1959

Panama
- Name: Hernan Cortes
- Namesake: Hernán Cortés
- Owner: Harris & Dixon Ltd., London
- Operator: Cia. Auxiliar Maritima, Costa Rica
- Acquired: 1959
- Fate: Run aground, 15 October 1966; Refloated, declared constructive total loss (CTL), scrapped 1967

General characteristics
- Class & type: Liberty ship; type EC2-S-C1, standard
- Tonnage: 10,865 LT DWT; 7,176 GRT
- Displacement: 3,380 long tons (3,434 t) (light); 14,245 long tons (14,474 t) (max)
- Length: 441 feet 6 inches (135 m) oa; 416 feet (127 m) pp; 427 feet (130 m) lwl
- Beam: 57 feet (17 m)
- Draft: 27 ft 9.25 in (8.4646 m)
- Installed power: 2 × Oil fired 450 °F (232 °C) boilers, operating at 220 psi (1,500 kPa); 2,500 hp (1,900 kW)
- Propulsion: 1 × triple-expansion steam engine, (manufactured by General Machinery Corp., Hamilton, Ohio); 1 × screw propeller
- Speed: 11.5 knots (21.3 km/h; 13.2 mph)
- Capacity: 562,608 cubic feet (15,931 m^{3}) (grain); 499,573 cubic feet (14,146 m^{3}) (bale)
- Complement: 38–62 USMM; 21–40 USNAG
- Armament: Varied by ship; Bow-mounted 3-inch (76 mm)/50-caliber gun; Stern-mounted 4-inch (102 mm)/50-caliber gun; 2–8 × single 20-millimeter (0.79 in) Oerlikon anti-aircraft (AA) cannons and/or, 2–8 × 37-millimeter (1.46 in) M1 AA guns

SS Samingoy was a Liberty ship built in the United States during World War II. She was transferred to the British Ministry of War Transportation (MoWT) upon completion.

== Construction ==
Samingoy was laid down on 24 March 1944, under a Maritime Commission (MARCOM) contract, MC hull 2357, by J.A. Jones Construction, Brunswick, Georgia; sponsored by Mrs. Parks M. King, and launched on 30 April 1944.

== History ==
She was allocated to New Zealand Shipping, on 13 May 1944. On 20 June 1947, she was sold to the Federal Steam Navigation Company, Ltd., for commercial use, and renamed Stafford. After going through a couple of owners she was renamed Hernan Cortes and reflagged Panamanian, in 1961. She ran aground on Alacran Reef, Yucutan, and was declared a constructive total loss (CTL) on 15 October 1966. She was scrapped the following year.

== Bibliography ==
- "Jones Construction, Brunswick GA". www.ShipbuildingHistory.com. 13 October 2010.
- "Liberty Ships – World War II".
- Maritime Administration. "Samingoy". Ship History Database Vessel Status Card. U.S. Department of Transportation, Maritime Administration. Archived from the original on 12 December 2019.
- Davies, James (May 2004). "Specifications (As-Built)" (PDF). p. 23.
- "SS Samingoy".
