= SS Samfinn =

World War II Liberty ship of the United States

History

United States
- Name: Samfinn
- Ordered: as type (EC2-S-C1) hull, MC hull 2352
- Builder: J.A. Jones Construction, Brunswick, Georgia
- Cost: $1,071,236
- Yard number: 137
- Way number: 3
- Laid down: 14 February 1944
- Launched: 31 March 1944
- Sponsored by: Miss Betty Dean
- Completed: 13 April 1944
- Fate: Transferred to the British Ministry of War Transport upon completion.

United Kingdom
- Name: Samfinn
- Operator: Donaldson Bros. & Black
- Acquired: 13 April 1944
- Identification: Call Signal: MYTP
- Fate: Laid up in National Defense Reserve Fleet, Mobile, Alabama, 16 September 1947; Sold for scrapping, 18 April 1961

General characteristics
- Class & type: Liberty ship; type EC2-S-C1, standard
- Tonnage: 10,865 LT DWT; 7,176 GRT
- Displacement: 3,380 long tons (3,434 t) (light); 14,245 long tons (14,474 t) (max)
- Length: 441 feet 6 inches (135 m) oa; 416 feet (127 m) pp; 427 feet (130 m) lwl
- Beam: 57 feet (17 m)
- Draft: 27 ft 9.25 in (8.4646 m)
- Installed power: 2 × Oil fired 450 °F (232 °C) boilers, operating at 220 psi (1,500 kPa); 2,500 hp (1,900 kW)
- Propulsion: 1 × triple-expansion steam engine, (manufactured by General Machinery Corp., Hamilton, Ohio); 1 × screw propeller
- Speed: 11.5 knots (21.3 km/h; 13.2 mph)
- Capacity: 562,608 cubic feet (15,931 m^{3}) (grain); 499,573 cubic feet (14,146 m^{3}) (bale)
- Complement: 38–62 USMM; 21–40 USNAG
- Armament: Varied by ship; Bow-mounted 3-inch (76 mm)/50-caliber gun; Stern-mounted 4-inch (102 mm)/50-caliber gun; 2–8 × single 20-millimeter (0.79 in) Oerlikon anti-aircraft (AA) cannons and/or, 2–8 × 37-millimeter (1.46 in) M1 AA guns

SS Samfinn was a Liberty ship built in the United States during World War II. She was transferred to the British Ministry of War Transportation (MoWT) upon completion.

== Construction ==
Samfinn was laid down on 14 February 1944, under a United States Maritime Commission (MARCOM) contract, MC hull 2352, by J.A. Jones Construction, Brunswick, Georgia; sponsored by Miss Betty Dean, and launched on 31 March 1944.

== History ==
She was allocated to Donaldson Bros. & Black, on 13 April 1944. On 16 September 1947, she was laid up in the National Defense Reserve Fleet, in Mobile, Alabama. She was sold to Union Minerals and Alloys Corporation, 18 April 1961, for $62,339.89, for scrapping. She was removed from the fleet on 12 June 1961.

== Bibliography ==
- "Jones Construction, Brunswick GA". ShipbuildingHistory.com. 13 October 2010.
- "Liberty Ships – World War II".
- Maritime Administration. "Samfinn". Ship History Database Vessel Status Card. U.S. Department of Transportation, Maritime Administration. Archived from the original on 12 December 2019.
- Davies, James (May 2004). "Specifications (As-Built)" (PDF). p. 23.
- "SS Samfinn".
