= List of Liberty ships (E) =

This is a list of Liberty ships with names beginning with E.

== Description ==
The standard Liberty ship (EC-2-S-C1 type) was a cargo ship 441 feet 6 inches (134.57 m) long overall, with a beam of 56 feet 10 3/4 inches (17.34 m). It had a depth of 37 feet 4 inches (11.38 m) and a draft of 26 feet 10 inches (8.18 m). It was powered by a triple expansion steam engine, which had cylinders of 24 1/2 inches (62 cm), 37 inches (94 cm) and 70 inches (180 cm) diameter by 48 inches (120 cm) stroke. The engine produced 2,500ihp at 76rpm. Driving a four-blade propeller 18 feet 6 inches (5.64 m) in diameter, could propel the ship at 11 knots (20 km/h).

Cargo was carried in five holds, numbered 1–5 from bow to stern. Grain capacity was 84,183 cubic feet (2,383.8 m^{3}), 145,604 cubic feet (4,123.0 m^{3}), 96,429 cubic feet (2,730.6 m^{3}), 93,190 cubic feet (2,639 m^{3}) and 93,190 cubic feet (2,639 m^{3}), with a further 49,086 cubic feet (1,390.0 m^{3}) in the deep tanks. Bale capacity was 75,405 cubic feet (2,135.2 m^{3}), 134,638 cubic feet (3,812.5 m^{3}), 83,697 cubic feet (2,370.0 m^{3}), 82,263 cubic feet (2,329.4 m^{3}) and 82,435 cubic feet (2,334.3 m^{3}), with a further 41,135 cubic feet (1,164.8 m^{3}) in the deep tanks.

It carried a crew of 45, plus 36 United States Navy Armed Guard gunners. Later in the war, this was altered to a crew of 52, plus 29 gunners. Accommodation was in a three deck superstructure placed midships. The galley was equipped with a range, a 25 US gallons (95 L) stock kettle and other appliances. Messrooms were equipped with an electric hot plate and an electric toaster.

== E. A. Bryan ==
E. A. Bryan was built by Permanente Metals Corporation, Richmond, California. Her keel was laid on 11 February 1944. She was launched on 29 February and delivered on 8 March. Built for the War Shipping Administration (WSA), she was operated under the management of Oliver J. Olson & Co. Exploded and was destroyed at Port Chicago, California on 17 July 1944.

== E. A. Burnett ==
E. A. Burnett

E. A. Burnett was built by Permanente Metals Corporation. Her keel was laid on 8 March 1944. She was launched on 30 March and delivered on 6 April. She was scrapped at Panama City, Florida in March 1967.

== E. A. Christenson ==
E. A. Christenson was built by Permanente Metals Corporation. Her keel was laid on 11 April 1944. She was launched on 28 April and delivered on 6 May. Built for the WSA, she was operated under the management of Sudden & Christenson. Management transferred to Olympic Steamship Company in 1946. Sold in 1951 to Southern Cargo Carriers Corp. and renamed Seafort. Operated under the management of Orion Shipping & Trading. Sold in 1954 to Carga Del sur Compania Navigation, Panama. Re-registered to Liberia, remaining under the same management. Renamed Andros Fort in 1957. Sold in 1961 to Biscay Shipping Corp. and renamed Samothraki. Re-registered to Greece, remaining under the same management. Sold in 1963 to Compania Navigation Continental SA., Panama. Re-registered to Liberia and operated under the management of Ocean Shipping & Trading Corp. Scrapped at Hirao, Japan in August 1968.

== Eagle Seam ==
Eagle Seam was a collier built by Delta Shipbuilding Company, New Orleans, Louisiana. Her keel was laid on 4 April 1945. She was launched on 2 June and delivered on 25 July. Built for the WSA, she was operated under the management of Marine Transport Lines. Sold in 1946 to Marine Interests Corp., Jersey City, New Jersey. Renamed Marine Transport in 1947. Sold in 1952 to Marine Navigation Co., New York. Placed under the management of Marine Transport Lines in 1962. Scrapped at Kaohsiung, Taiwan in March 1971.

== E. A Peden ==
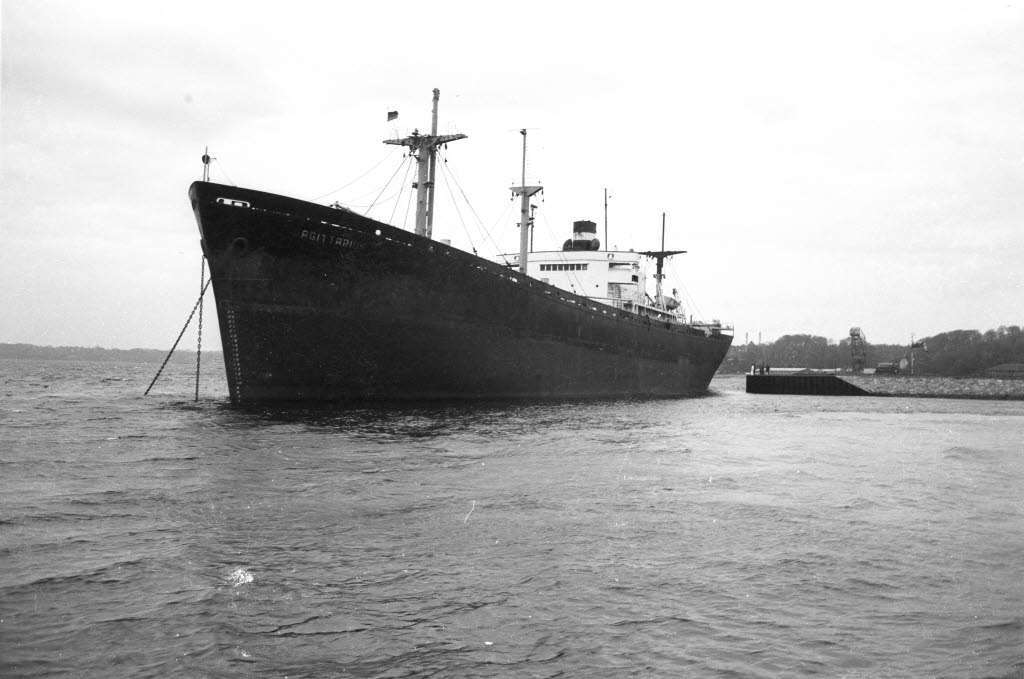
Sagittarius

E. A. Peden was built by Todd Houston Shipbuilding Corporation, Houston, Texas. Her keel was laid on 15 May 1943. She was launched on 24 June and delivered on 10 July. Built for the WSA, she was operated under the management of United States Navigation Company. Sold in 1947 to A. D. Mauthos & Co., New York and renamed Sounion. Sold in 1949 to Los & Peza and renamed Maria Los. Re-registered to Greece and operated under the management of Los Peza Shipping Agence. Management transferred to C. Kyriakoupoulos in 1941. Sold in 1955 to West Africa Navigation Ltd., Liberia and renamed Northport. Operated under the management of T. J. Verrando & Co. Management transferred to T. J. Transamerican Steamship Corp. in 1962. Sold in 1966 to Sagitarius Shipping Corp., Liberia and renamed Sagitarius. Operated under the management of Franco Ercole. Collided with the East German cargo ship Schwarzburg and sank off Buenos Aires, Argentina on 26 September 1969 whilst on a voyage from Rosario, Argentina to Ravenna, Italy. Refloated on 1 October and towed in to Buenos Aires. Scrapped at Campana, Argentina in December 1969.

== Earl Layman ==
Earl Layman was built by Southeastern Shipbuilding Corporation, Savannah, Georgia. Her keel was laid on 31 January 1944. She was launched on 17 March and delivered on 31 March. Built for the WSA, she was operated under the management of Polarus Steamship Co. Management transferred to A. L. Burbank & Co. in 1946. Sold that year to Compania de Navigation Cristobal, Panama and renamed Ionian Trader. Operated under the management of Vergottis Ltd. Scrapped at Kure, Japan in May 1967.

== Edgar Allan Poe ==
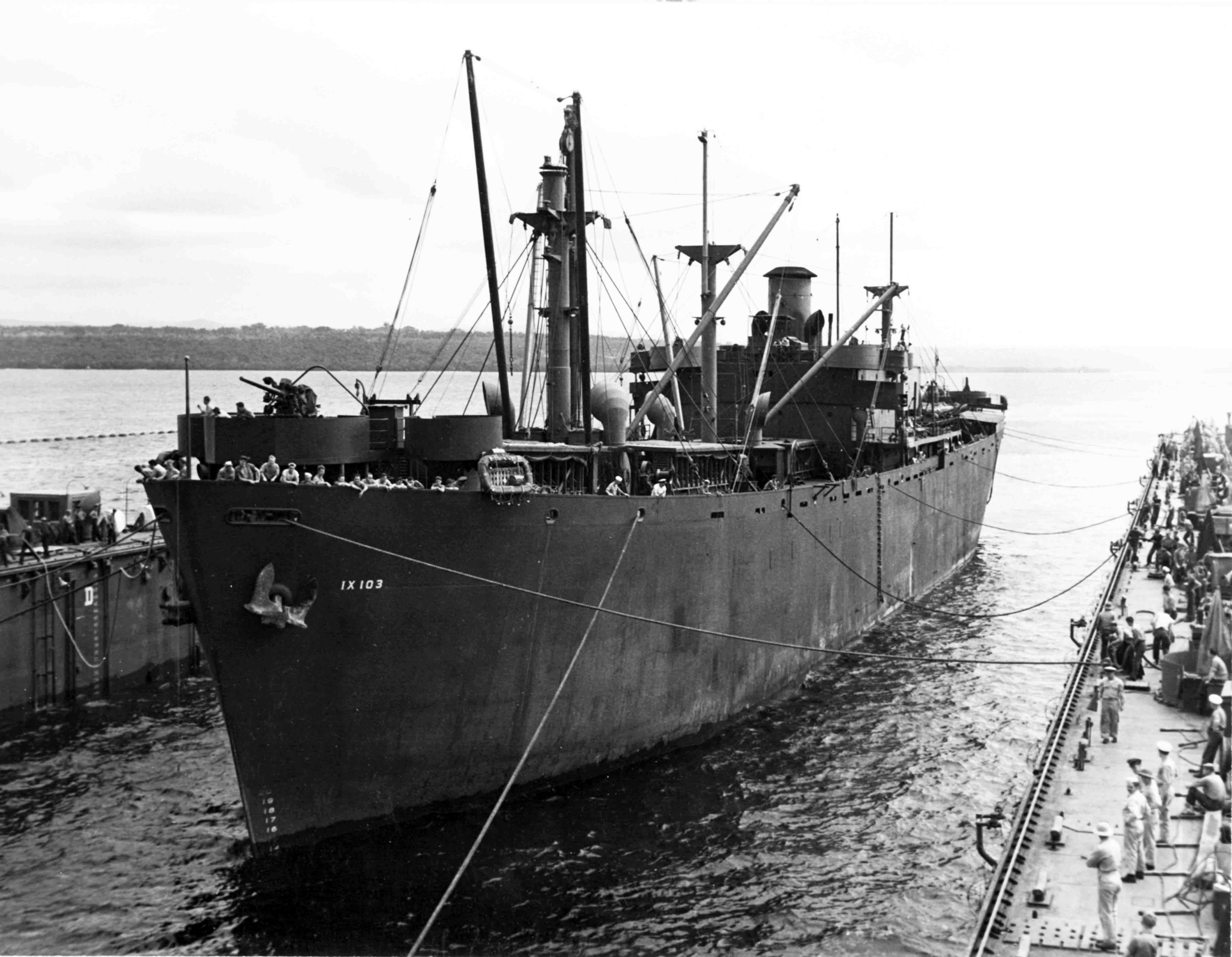
USS E. A. Poe

Edgar Allan Poe was built by Oregon Shipbuilding Corporation, Portland, Oregon. Her keel was laid on 24 January 1942. She was launched on 26 March and delivered on 28 April. Built for the WSA, she was operated under the management of Weyerhauser Steamship Co. Torpedoed and damaged 56 nautical miles (104 km) south east of Noumea, New Caledonia by I-21 on 9 November 1942. Towed in to Noumea and beached. Declared a constructive total loss. Transferred to the United States Navy in August 1943, renamed E. A. Poe. Returned to WSA in March 1946 and renamed Edgar Allan Poe. Laid up at Subic Bay, Philippines. Sold to Chinese shipbreakers in 1949. Driven ashore at Hong Kong in a typhoon on 7 September 1949. Still ashore in October 1950. Scrapped at Hong Kong in December 1950.

== Edgar E. Clark ==
Edgar E. Clark was built by J. A. Jones Construction Co., Panama City. Her keel was laid on 25 October 1943. She was launched on 11 December and delivered on 7 February 1944. A tank transport, she was built for the United States Army. Laid up in the James River post-war, she was scuttled off the Virginia Capes on 13 May 1977.

== Edgar W. Nye ==
Edgar W. Nye was built by Permanente Metals Corporation. Her keel was laid on 19 September 1943. She was launched on 8 October and delivered on 18 October. She was scrapped at Terminal Island Los Angeles, California. in March 1962.

== Edith Wharton ==
Edith Wharton was built by Bethlehem Fairfield Shipyard, Baltimore, Maryland. Her keel was laid on 26 September 1943. She was launched as Edith Wharton on 17 October and delivered as Samvern on 28 October. To the MoWT under Lend-Lease. Operated under the management of William Thomson & Co. Struck a mine and sank in the Scheldt (51°22′N 3°02′E) on 18 January 1945. Her wreck was dispersed in December 1963.

== Edmond Mallet ==
Edmond Mallet was built by New England Shipbuilding Corporation, South Portland, Maine. Her keel was laid on 4 October 1944. She was launched on 17 November and delivered on 30 November. Built for the WSA, she was operated under the management of Marine Transport Lines. Management transferred to James Griffiths & Sons in 1946. Sold in 1951 to Alaska Steamship Co., Seattle, Washington and renamed Iliamna. Converted to carry passengers in 1953. Scrapped at Kaohsiung in July 1972.

== Edmund Fanning ==
Edmund Fanning was built by California Shipbuilding Corporation, Terminal Island. Her keel was laid on 11 January 1943. She was launched on 8 February and delivered on 25 February. She caught fire and exploded at Genoa, Italy on 13 March 1947 whilst on a voyage from Bremen, Germany to Fusan, Korea. She was beached and consequently declared a constructive total loss. Scrapped at Genoa in 1948.

== Edmund F. Dickens ==
Edmund F. Dickens was built by Oregon Shipbuilding Corporation. Her keel was laid on 2 September 1943. She was launched on 17 September and delivered on 24 September. Built for the WSA, she was operated under the management of Pacific Atlantic Steamship Co. Damaged by a mine at Manila, Philippines on 2 May 1945 whilst on a voyage from Leyte to Manila. Temporary repairs were made and she was towed to New York via the Panama Canal. Declared a constructive total loss, she was laid up in the James River. Scrapped at Baltimore in September 1947.

== Edmund G. Ross ==
Edmund G. Ross was built by Oregon Shipbuilding Corporation. Her keel was laid on 2 October 1943. She was launched on 22 October and delivered on 29 October. She was scrapped at Oakland, California in May 1961.

== Edmund Randolph ==
Edmund Randolph was built by California Shipbuilding Corporation. Her keel was laid on 15 January 1943. She was launched on 12 February and delivered on 28 February. She was scrapped at Portland, Oregon in December 1966.

== Edvard Greig ==
Edvard Grieg

Edvard Greig was built by Bethlehem Fairfield Shipyard. Her keel was laid on 24 April 1943. She was launched as Thomas F. Bayard on 24 May and delivered as Edvard Grieg on 31 May. To the Norwegian Government under charter, she was operated under the management of Andreas Stray, Farsund. Sold in July 1946 to Ing. Bjørneboe, Kristiansand. Sold in December 1946 to Andreas Stray. Sold in 1949 to A/S Sobral, Oslo. Operated under the management of Oivind Lorentzen. Sold in 1951 to Socony Vacuum Oil Co. Also stated as sold to Brillian Transport Co., Panama that year. Sold to L.P.G. Carriers Inc., New York in 1952. Converted at Kiel, West Germany to a Liquified Natural Gas tanker. Now 441 feet 6 inches (134.57 m) long and assessed at 7,468 GRT. Renamed Ultragas Sao Paulo. Sold in 1961 to A/S Gasskib, Oslo and renamed Mundogas Sao Paulo. Re-registered to Norway and operated under the management of Oivind Lorentzen. Converted to a floating store in February 1969. Subsequently grounded at Santos, Brazil as a storage tank. Transferred to Mundogas Inc., Monrovia, Liberia in November 1969.

== Edward A. Filene ==
Edward A. Filene was built by St. Johns River Shipbuilding Company, Jacksonville, Florida. Her keel was laid on 9 February 1944. She was launched on 6 April and delivered on 20 April. She was sunk as a breakwater and dock at Cook Inlet, Alaska in 1966.

== Edward A. McDowell ==
Edward A. McDowell was built by Permanente Metals Corporation.Her keel was laid on 25 April 1943. She was launched on 20 May and delivered on 28 May. Built for the WSA, she was operated under the management of James Griffiths & Sons. Sold in 1947 to Westfal-Larsen & Co., Bergen, Norway and renamed Kent County. Sold in 1958 to Gibson Shipping Co., Macao and renamed Gibson. Re-registered to Panama. Renamed Twinfox in 1959. Sold in 1960 to Great Southern Steamship Co., Hong Kong. Sold in 1961 to Mutual Shipping Co. Re-registered to Panama and operated under the management of Gibson Shipping Co. Management transferred to Van Engineers Ltd in 1965. Scrapped at Kaohsiung in April 1967.

== Edward A. Savoy ==
Edward A. Savoy was built by Bethlehem Fairfield Shipyard. Her keel was laid on 15 July 1944. She was launched on 19 July and delivered on 29 July. Built for the WSA, she was operated under the management of Merchants & Miners Transportation Co. Sold in 1947 to Ponchelet Marine Corp., New York and renamed Davis-Clinchfield 21. Sold in 1948 to Stone Steamship Co. and renamed Mary J. Goulandris. Operated under the management of Orion Shipping & Trading Co. Sold in 1953 to Cerro Blanco Compania Armamente, Panama and renamed Mary J. G., remaining under the same management. Sold in 1954 to Pedergal Compania Navigation, Panama and renamed Estoril. Operated under the management of Goulandris Ltd. Collided with the Italian cargo ship Dea Mazzella and sank in the Atlantic Ocean 440 nautical miles (810 km) east of Boston, Massachusetts (42°50′N 60°00′W) on 11 July 1956 whilst on a voyage from the Ionian Islands, Greece to Baltimore.

== Edward Bates ==
Edward Bates was built by Permanente Metals Corporation. Her keel was laid on 24 January 1943. She was launched on 28 February and delivered on 13 March. Built for the WSA, she was operated under the management of Hammond Shipping Co. Torpedoed and damaged by enemy aircraft in the Mediterranean Sea off Ténès Algeria (36°38′N 0°50′E) on 1 February 1944 whilst on a voyage from the Hampton Roads, Virginia to Palermo, Sicily, Italy. Abandoned by her crew, she was taken in tow but consequently sank.

== Edward B. Dudley ==
Edward B. Dudley was built by North Carolina Shipbuilding Company. Her keel was laid on 17 January 1943. She was launched on 13 February and delivered on 21 February. Built for the WSA, she was operated under the management of Bulk Carriers Corp. Torpedoed and sunk in the Atlantic Ocean (approximately 53°N 38°W) by U-615 on 11 April 1943 whilst on a voyage from Halifax, Dominion of Canada to Liverpool, United Kingdom.

== Edward Bellamy ==
Edward Bellamy was built by Oregon Shipbuilding Corporation. Her keel was laid on 26 March 1943. She was launched on 14 April and delivered on 22 April. Laid up in Puget Sound post-war, she was scrapped at Tacoma, Washington in December 1970.

== Edward B. Haines ==
Edward B. Haines was built by Bethlehem Fairfield Shipyard. Her keel was laid on 22 February 1944. She was launched on 22 March and delivered on 4 April. Built for the WSA, she was operated under the management of Cosmopolitan Shipping Co. Sold in 1947 to Weyerhauser Shipping Co., Newark, New Jersey and renamed John Weyerhauser. Sold in 1969 to Reliance Carriers SA, Panama and renamed Reliance Integrity. Operated under the management of Hong Kong Maritime Co. Scrapped at Kaohsiung in March 1971.

== Edward Bruce ==
Edward Bruce was built by Bethlehem Fairfield Shipyard. Her keel was laid on 11 October 1943. She was launched as Edward Bruce on 8 November and delivered as Samoine on 15 November. To MoWT under Lend-Lease. Renamed Edward Bruce later that year and placed under the management of Stanley & John Thompson. To United States Maritime Commission (USMC) in 1947, laid up in the James River. Scrapped at Kearny, New Jersey in September 1971.

== Edward Burleson ==
Edward Burleson was built by Todd Houston Shipbuilding Corporation. Her keel was laid on 15 April 1943. She was launched on 27 May and delivered on 11 June. She was scrapped at Oakland in April 1963.

== Edward Canby ==
Edward Canby was built by Oregon Shipbuilding Corporation. Her keel was laid on 23 May 1943. She was launched on 12 June and delivered on 20 June. She was scrapped at Hirao in 1961.

== Edward Cook ==
Edward Cook was built by Bethlehem Fairfield Shipyard. Her keel was laid on 15 September 1943. She was launched as Edward Cook on 8 October and delivered as Samwis on 15 October. To the MoWT under Lend-Lease. Operated under the management of T. & J. Harrison. Sold in 1947 to Charente Steamship Co., Liverpool and renamed Specialist. Sold in 1964 to Atlantic Maritime Carriers, Panama and renamed Mitera. Re-registered to Liberia and placed under the management of Hadjipateras Bros. Re-registered to Greece in 1966. Scrapped at Hong Kong in November 1968.

== Edward D. Baker ==
Edward D. Baker was built by Oregon Shipbuilding Corporation. Her keel was laid on 13 July 1943. She was launched on 1 August and delivered on 9 August. She was scrapped at Beaumont, Texas in 1959.

== Edward D. White ==
Edward D. White was built by J. A. Jones Construction Company, Brunswick, Georgia. Her keel was laid on 22 June 1943. She was launched on 20 September and delivered on 30 September. Built for the WSA, she was operated under the management of A. H. Bull & Co. Laid up in the Hudson River post-war, she was scrapped at Kearny in September 1970.

== Edward Eggleston ==
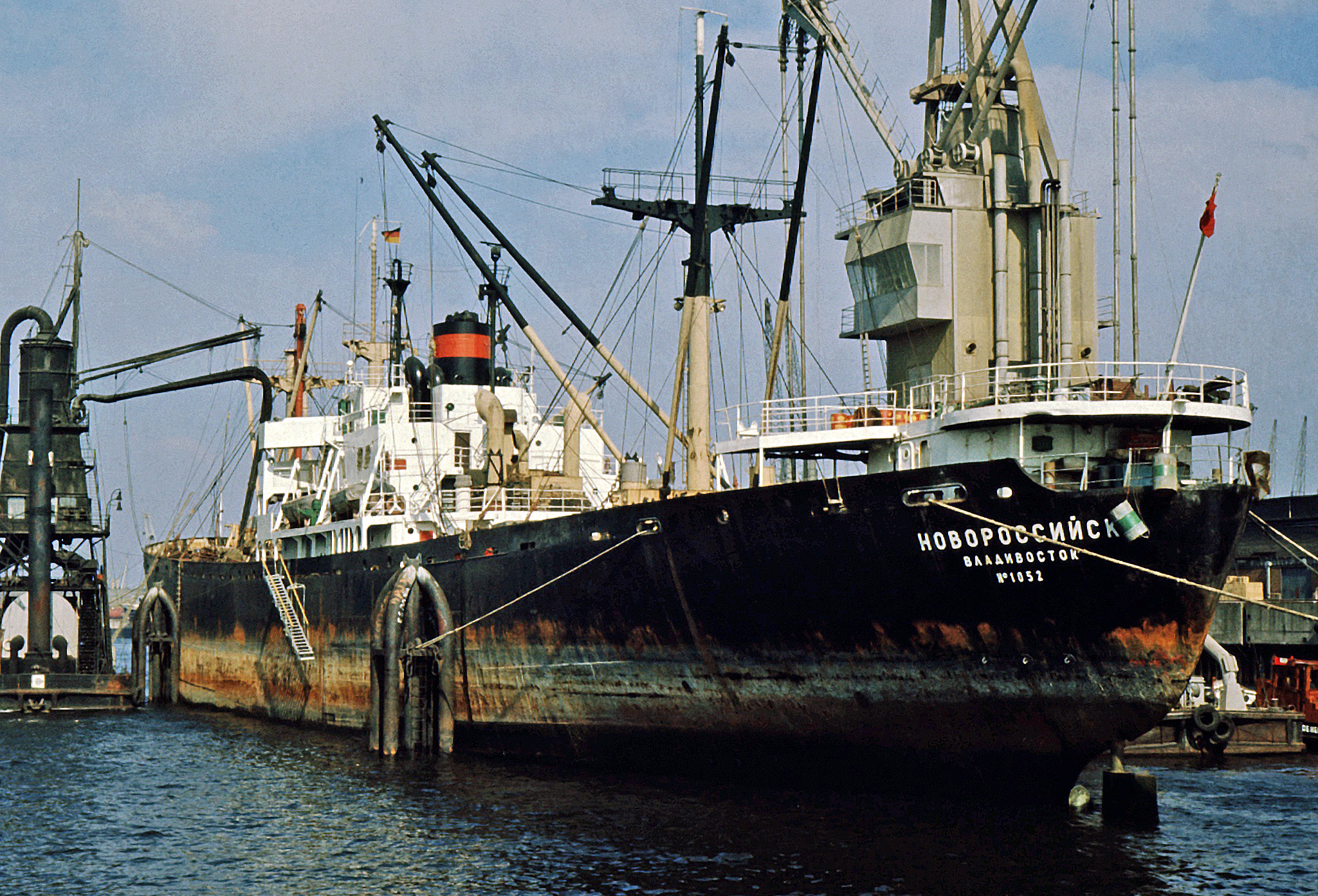
Novorossisk

Edward Eggleston was built by Oregon Shipbuilding Corporation. Her keel was laid on 20 April 1943. She was launched as Edward Eggleston on 9 May and delivered as Novorossisk on 17 May. To the Soviet Union, she was scrapped in 1974.

== Edward E. Hale ==
Edward E. Hale was built by Permanente Metals Corporation. Her keel was laid on 15 February 1944. She was launched on 6 March and delivered on 15 March. Built for the WSA, she was operated under the management of General Steamship Corp. To the French Government in 1947 and renamed Domfront. Operated under the management of Compagnie Générale Transatlantique (CGT). Sold in 1965 to Société Monagasque de Transports Maritimes, Monaco and renamed Saint Lys. Scrapped at Hiroshima, Japan in March 1967.

== Edward E. Spafford ==
Edward E. Spafford was built by New England Shipbuilding Corporation. Her keel was laid on 5 June 1944. She was launched on 22 July and delivered on 31 July. Laid up at Beaumont post-war, she was scrapped at Brownsville, Texas in March 1974.

== Edward Everett ==
Edward Everett was built by Oregon Shipbuilding Corporation. Her keel was laid on 26 August 1942. She was launched on 26 September and delivered on 8 October. She was scrapped at Portland, Oregon in February 1969.

== Edward G. Acheson ==
Edward G. Acheson was built by Permanente Metals Corporation. Her keel was laid on 22 November 1943. She was launched on 11 December and delivered on 19 December. Built for the WSA, she was operated under the management of Union Sulphur Company. To the Italian Government in 1947 and renamed Versilia. Operated under the management of Navigazione Viarregina. Sold in 1962 to Seaspray Shipping Co., Liberia and renamed Sea Urchin. Operated under the management of Ballestrero, Tuena & Canella. Scrapped at Osaka, Japan in May 1967.

== Edward G. Janeway ==
Edward G. Janeway was built by Todd Houston Shipbuilding Corporation. Her keel was laid on 5 August 1944. She was launched on 14 September and delivered on 26 September. Built for the WSA, she was operated under the management of Smith & Johnson. Laid up at Mobile in 1949, she was sold in 1951 to Elam Shipping Corp. and renamed Santa Venetia. Operated under the management of Maritime Trade Corp. Management transferred to Tankship Management Corp. in 1954, then to Cargo & Tankship Management Corp. in 1958. Sold to Capa Co. SA in 1961 and re-registered to Liberia. Operated under the management of Santa Maria Shipowning & Trading. Main deck fractured when she was off Midway Atoll on 30 December 1963. Temporary repairs were made, enabling her to reach Yokohama, Japan. Scrapped at Oppama, Japan in September 1964.

== Edward H. Crockett ==
Edward H. Crockett was built by New England Shipbuilding Corporation. Her keel was laid on 29 November 1943. She was launched on 25 January 1944 and delivered on 31 January. Built for the WSA, she was operated under the management of American Export Lines. Torpedoed and damaged by U-310 in the Barents Sea (72°59′N 24°26′E) on 29 September 1944 whilst on a voyage from the Kola Inlet to Loch Ewe. She was scuttled by a Royal Navy destroyer.

== Edward J. Berwind ==
Edward J. Berwind was built by Southeastern Shipbuilding Corporation. Her keel was laid on 10 November 1944. She was launched on 16 December and delivered on 6 January 1945. She was scrapped at Jacksonville in September 1961.

== Edward J. O'Brien ==
Edward J. O'Brien was built by California Shipbuilding Corporation. Her keel was laid on 4 December 1943. She was launched on 28 December and delivered on 15 January 1944. Built for the WSA, she was operated under the management of General Steamship Corp. Sold in 1947 to Aegean Steamship Co., Athens, Greece and renamed Demosthenes. Operated under the management of Vergottis Ltd. She was scrapped at Bilbao, Spain in June 1967.

== Edward Kavanagh ==
Edward Kavanagh was built by New England Shipbuilding Corporation. Her keel was laid on 14 November 1943. She was launched on 24 December and delivered on 5 January 1944. Converted at Yokosuka, Japan to an experimental minesweeper for the United States Navy in 1953. Assigned the pennant number YAG 38 but not named. Sold to American buyers in 1960, presumed scrapped.

== Edward K. Collins ==
Edward K. Collins was built by J. A. Jones Construction Company, Panama City. Her keel was laid on 14 July 1944. She was launched on 17 August and delivered on 31 August. Built for the WSA, she was operated under the management of Smith & Johnson. Sold in 1947 to Kossos Steam Navigation Co., Syra, Greece and renamed Chelatros. Operated under the management of Pvaticos, Rethymnis. Sold in 1961 to Compania Navigation Alabastros and renamed Souliotis II. Operated under the management of Rethymnis. Sold in 1063 to Universal Shipping Co. Liberia and renamed Universal Trader. Operated under the management of Pacific Steamship Agency. Caught fire and was beached on the coast of Ceylon (6°24′N 81°47′E) on 9 March 1968 whilst on a voyage from Gdynia, Poland to Chittagong, East Pakistan. She broke in two and sank on 18 March.

== Edward Lander ==
Edward Lander was built by Oregon Shipbuilding Corporation. Her keel was laid on 7 January 1944. She was launched on 25 January and delivered on 2 February. She was scrapped at Oakland in 1958.

== Edward L. Grant ==
Edward L. Grant was built by Bethlehem Fairfield Shipyard. Her keel was laid on 18 May 1943. She was launched on 12 June and delivered on 25 June. Built for the WSA, she was operated under the management of American-West African Line. Management transferred to T. J. Stevenson & Co. in 1946. Laid up at Beaumont in 1948. Sold in 1951 to Bloomfield Steamship Co., Houston and renamed Lucile Bloomfield. Sold in 1954 to Compania Comercial Transatlantica SA, Panama and renamed Santa Rosa. Operated under the management of Spiros Polemis. Sold in 1955 to Panathea Trading & Shipowing Co. Re-registered to Liberia and operated under the management of Mar-Trade Corp. Collided with the Norwegian tanker Erling Borthen in the English Channel off the Sovereign Lightship on 5 May 1956. The tanker caught fire and was severely damaged. Management transferred to Cargo & Tankship Management Corp. in 1958, then to Santa Maria Shipowning & Trading in 1961. Scrapped at Hirao in January 1965.

== Edward Livingston ==
Edward Livingston was built by California Shipbuilding Corporation. Her keel was laid on 18 September 1942. She was launched on 21 October and delivered on 7 November. She was scrapped at Kearny in 1966.

== Edward L. Logan ==
Edward L. Logan was built by New England Shipbuilding Corporation. Her keel was laid on 17 August 1944. She was launched on 29 September and delivered on 10 October. Built for the WSA, she was operated under the management of American Foreign Steamship Corporation, New York. Sold to her managers in 1947 and renamed American Eagle. Sold in 1957 to Atlantic Robin Steamship Corp. and renamed Atlantic Robin. Re-registered to Liberia and operated under the management of American Foreign Steamship Corporation. Sold in 1963 to Caribbean Maritime Co. and renamed Diamantis Gafos. Still registered in Liberia, and operated under the management of Pacific Steamship Agency. Abandoned in a sinking condition off the coast of Trinidad (0°41′S 41°53′W) on 4 December 1967 whilst on a voyage from Tampa, Florida to Bombay, India.

== Edward M. House ==
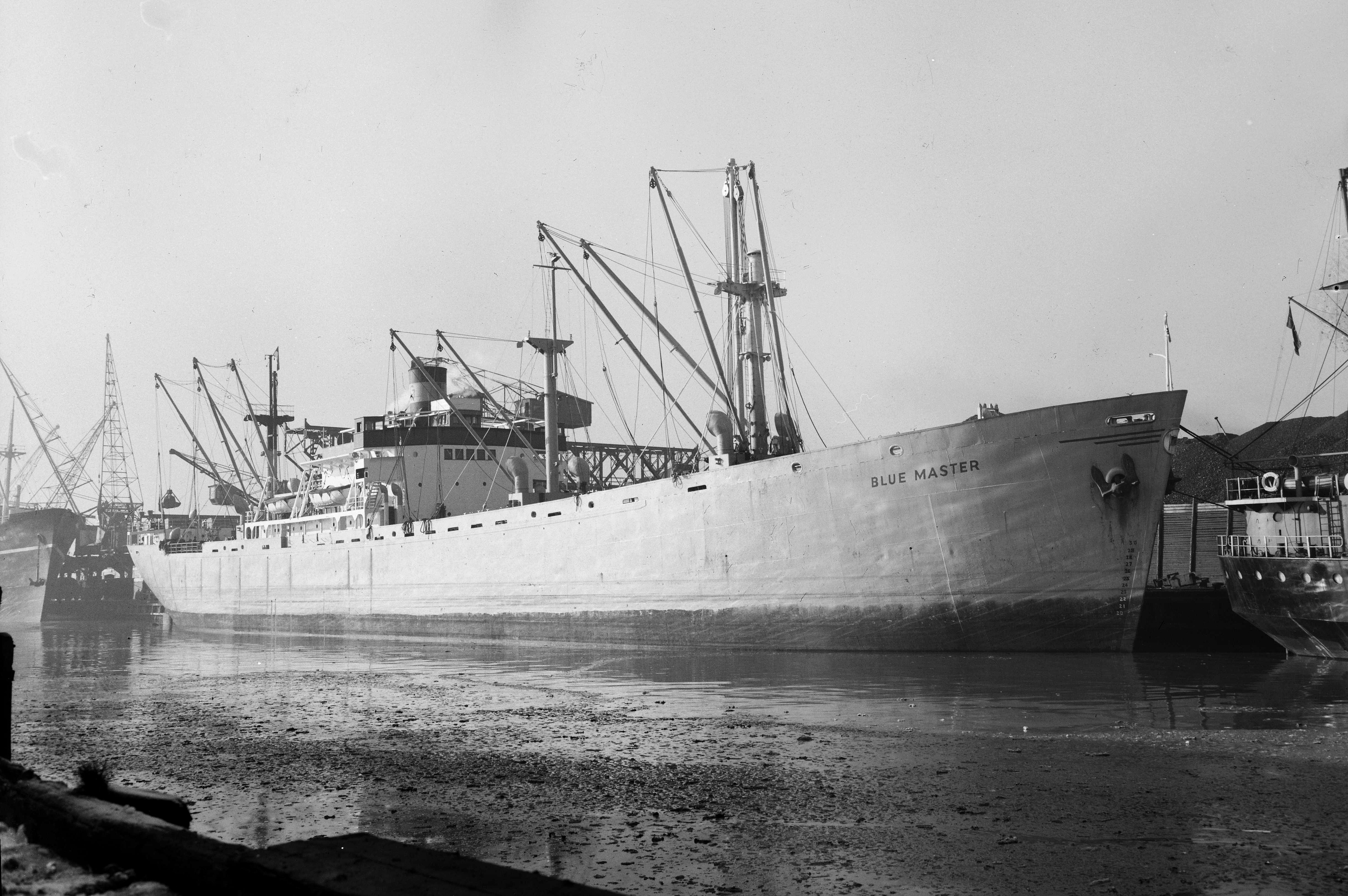
Edward M. House as Blue Master at Oslo in 1952

Edward M. House was built by St. Johns River Shipbuilding Company. Her keel was laid on 21 August 1943. She was launched on 23 October and delivered on 4 November. Built for the WSA, she was operated under the management of A. L. Burbank & Co. Torpedoed and damaged in the English Channel by U-984 on 29 June 1944. Towed to the River Tyne for repairs. To United States War Department in 1946. Sold in 1947 to Rederi A/S Vindeggen, Oslo. Sold later that year to Skibs A/S Golden West and renamed Blue Master. Operated under the management of A. F. Klaveness & Co. Management transferred to J. H. Andersen in 1948. Sold in 1954 to Bahia Salinas Compania Navigation, Panama and renamed Dicoronia. Re-registered to Liberia and operated under the management of Goulandris Bros. She collided with USS Hartley off Cape Henry, Virginia, United States on 16 June 1965. Re-registered to Greece in 1967. Scrapped at Shanghai, China in February 1970.

== Edward N. Hinton ==
Edward N. Hinton was built by Todd Houston Shipbuilding Corpo0ration. Her keel was laid on 3 February 1945. She was launched on 15 March and delivered on 31 March. Re-registered to France. To the French Government in 1947 and renamed Les Andelys. Operated under the management of Société Navale de l'Ouest. Sold in 1954 to San Pedro Compania Armamente, Panama and renamed Cormorant. Re-registered to Liberia and operated under the management of Goulandris Bros. Scrapped at Onomichi, Japan in September 1969.

== Edward N. Hurley ==
Edward N. Hurley was built by Bethlehem Fairfield Shipyard. Her keel was laid on 28 February 1943. She was launched on 31 March and delivered on 12 April. She was scrapped at Mobile in 1957.

== Edward N. Westcott ==
Edward N. Westcott was built by Oregon Shipbuilding Corporation. Her keel was laid on 8 August 1943. She was launched on 27 August and delivered on 4 September. She was scrapped at Mobile in February 1960.

== Edward Paine ==
Edward Paine was built by California Shipbuilding Corporation. Her keel was laid on 24 October 1943. She was launched on 22 November and delivered on 9 December. She was scrapped at Mobile in January 1961.

== Edward P. Alexander ==
Edward P. Alexander was built by J. A. Jones Construction Company, Brunswick. Her keel was laid on 21 September 1943. She was launched on 23 November and delivered on 30 November. Built for the WSA, she was operated under the management of Interocean Steamship Corp. Sold in 1947 to Fratelli d'Amico, Rome, Italy and renamed Orizia. Driven ashore at Veracruz, Mexico on 20 January 1963 whilst on a voyage from Genoa to Houston. Declared a total loss, she was sold for scrap but was reported still ashore in March 1970.

== Edward P. Costigan ==
Edward P. Costigan was built by Permanente Metals Corporation. Her keel was laid on 23 December 1942. She was launched on 28 January 1943 and delivered on 11 February. She was scrapped at Portland, Oregon in August 1959.

== Edward Preble ==
Edward Preble was built by New England Shipbuilding Corporation. Her keel was laid on 19 October 1942. She was launched on 2 January 1943 and delivered on 30 January. To the United States Navy in November 1943, renamed Volans. Converted for navy use by Tampa Bay Shipbuilding Co. Placed in reserve at Pearl Harbor, Hawaii in June 1946. Returned to USMC in June 1946 and officially renamed Edward Preble. Laid up in Suisun Bay as Volans. Scrapped at Oakland in February 1965.

== Edward P. Ripley ==
Edward P. Ripley was built by Permanente Metals Corporation. Her keel was laid on8 May 1944. She was launched on 29 May and delivered on 6 June. Built for the WSA, she was operated under the management of W. R. Chamberlain & Co. Sold in 1949 to Dover Steamship Co., New York and renamed Flora C.. Sold in 1956 to Arrow Steamship Co., New York and renamed Arthur Fribourg. Sold in 1958 to Long, Quinn & Boylan, New York and renamed Dorothy Boylan. Sold in 1961 to Amerind Shipping Co., New York, then sold in 1963 to Earl J. Smith & Co., New York. Sold in 1965 to Hudson Waterways Corp. and renamed Dorothy. Operated under the management of Transeastern Associates Inc. Scrapped at Santander, Spain in October 1968.

== Edward Richardson ==
Edward Richardson was built by North Carolina Shipbuilding Company. Her keel was laid on 11 May 1943. She was launched on 4 June and delivered on 10 June. To the United States Navy in 1955. Laid up in the James River. Scrapped at Panama City, Florida in June 1972.

== Edward Rowland Sill ==
Edward Rowland Sill was built by Permanente Metals Corporation. Her keel was laid on 15 May 1942. She was launched on 14 July and delivered on 20 August. She was scrapped at Oakland in November 1967.

== Edward R. Squibb ==
Edward R. Squibb was built by J. A. Jones Construction Company, Brunswick. Her keel was laid on 6 October 1944. She was launched on 9 November and delivered on 21 November. Built for the WSA, she was operated under the management of West India Steamship Co. She collided with the Dutch ship Tijger off the Goodwin Sands, United Kingdom on 14 February 1946. Tijger sank. All eight people on board were rescued by Edward R. Squibb. Laid up at Beaumont post-war, She was scrapped at Brownsville in June 1971.

== Edward Rutledge ==
Edward Rutledge was built by North Carolina Shipbuilding Company. Her keel was laid on 30 March 1942. She was launched on 21 June and delivered on 8 July. She was scrapped at Mobile in September 1961.

== Edward S. Hough ==
Edward S. Hough was built by Permanente Metals Corporation. Her keel was laid on 6 March 1944. She was launched on 28 March and delivered on 5 April. She was scrapped at Philadelphia, Pennsylvania in October 1970.

== Edward Sparrow ==
Edward Sparrow was built by Delta Shipbuilding Company. Her keel was laid on 2 May 1943. She was launched on 6 June and delivered on 25 June. Laid up in the James River post-war, She arrived at Bilbao for scrapping in February 1973.

== Edward W. Bok ==
Edward W. Bok was built by St. Johns River Shipbuilding Company. Her keel was laid on 14 January 1944. She was launched on 12 March and delivered on 27 March. Built for the WSA, she was operated under the management of Luckenbach Steamship Co. Sold in 1947 to Impresse Navigazione Commerciale, Rome and renamed Paolina. Sold in 1959 to Navigazione San Giorgio and renamed Nando. Fiat diesel engine fitted at Genoa that year. Sold in 1960 to General Navigation, Panama and renamed Kim. Operated under the management of Agemar SA. Sold in 1965 to Sun Navigation Co., Panama and renamed Sun. Operated under the management of L. Ottavini. Scrapped at Hirao in June 1970.

== Edward W. Burton ==
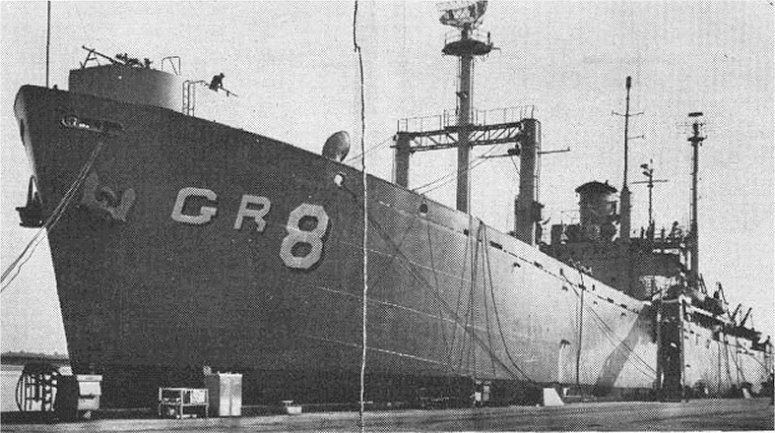
USS Interceptor

Edward W. Burton was a boxed aircraft transport ship built by J. A. Jones Construction Co., Panama City. Her keel was laid on10 July 1045. She was launched on 12 September and delivered on 28 September. Laid up at Wilmington, North Carolina post-war. To United States Navy in June 1955 and renamed Interceptor. Converted for naval use at Charleston Naval Shipyard. Laid up at Suisin Bay in September 1965. Presumed subsequently scrapped.

== Edward W. Scripps ==
Edward W. Scripps was built by California Shipbuilding Corporation. Her keel was laid on 6 April 1943. She was launched on 28 April and delivered on 11 May. Laid up at Beaumont post-war, she was scuttled off South Padre Island, Texas in August 1975.

== Edwin Abbey ==
Edwin Abbey was built by California Shipbuilding Corporation. Her keel was laid on 13 July 1943. She was launched on 5 August and delivered on 19 August. Built for the WSA, she was operated under the management of Shephard Steamship Co. Laid up in 1948, management was transferred to Pacific Far East Line in 1949. She was laid up again in 1950, the sold in 1951 to Traders Steamship Corp., New York and renamed Greenstar. Sold in 1954 to Belant Shipping Co., Panama and renamed Valor. Re-registered to Liberia and operated under the management of Triton Shipping Inc. Renamed Ormos in 1960 and re-registered to Greece. Sold in 1966 to Synthia Shipping Co., Panama. Re-registered to Liberia and operated under the management of Nereus Shipping. Scrapped at Moji, Japan in February 1967.

== Edwin A. Robinson ==
Edwin A. Robinson was built by Bethlehem Fairfield Shipyard. Her keel was laid on 8 October 1943. She was launched as Edwin A. Robinson on 1 November and delivered as Samsip on 9 November. To the MoWT under Lend-Lease. Operated under the management of New Zealand Shipping Company. Struck a mine in the Scheldt off Blankenberge, Belgium on 7 December 1944. Scuttled by Allied warships.

== Edwin A. Stevens ==
Edwin A. Stevens was built by Delta Shipbuilding Company. Her keel was laid on 7 March 1944. She was launched on 17 April and delivered on 21 May. Built for the United States War Department. Sold in 1947 to Rethymnis & Kulukundis, Piraeus, Greece & London, United Kingdom. Renamed Ioannis G. Kulukundis and registered in Greece. Ran aground at Point Arguello, California on 11 July 1949 whilst on a voyage from Vancouver, Dominion of Canada to Cape Town, Union of South Africa and was a total loss.

== Edwin Booth ==
Edwin Booth was built by Oregon Shipbuilding Corporation. Her keel was laid on 14 November 1942. She was launched on 9 December and delivered on 17 December. She was scrapped at Portland, Oregon in August 1969.

== Edwin C. Musick ==
Edwin C. Musick was built by Permanente Metals Corporation. Her keel was laid on 22 January 1944. She was launched on 11 February and delivered on 18 February. She was scrapped at Portland, Oregon in December 1958.

== Edwin D. Howard ==
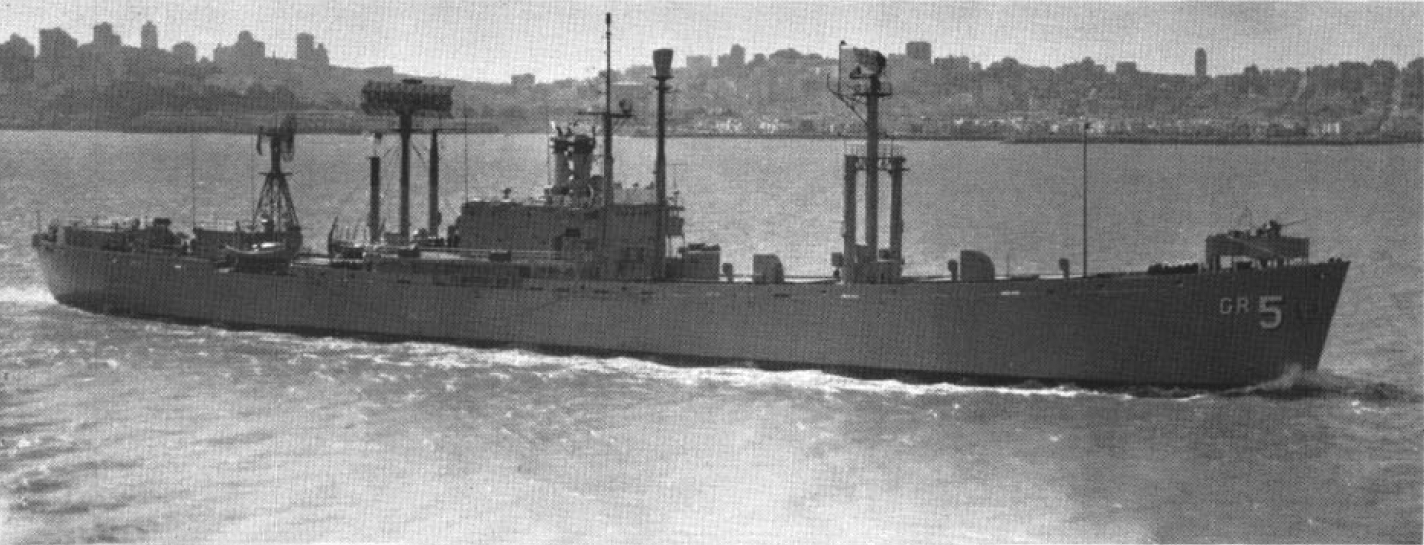
USS Scanner

Edwin D. Howard was a boxed aircraft transport ship built by J. A. Jones Construction Company, Panama City. Her keel was laid on 24 January 1945. She was launched on 14 February and delivered on 14 March. Built for the WSA, she was acquired by the United States Navy in June 1955 and renamed Scanner. Converted for navy use at Norfolk Naval Shipyard. Laid up in Suisun Bay in July 1965. Sold to General Exploration Co., Dallas, Texas for non-transportation use in October 1974.

== Edwin G. Weed ==
Edwin G. Weed was built by St. Johns River Shipbuilding Company. Her keel was laid on 7 December 1943. She was launched on 29 January 1944 and delivered on 11 February. Built for the WSA, she was operated under the management of South Atlantic Steamship Line. Sold in 1947 to Giacomo Costa fu Andrea, Genoa and renamed Eugenio C. Sold in 1963 to Transatlantic Transport Corp., Lugano, Switzerland and renamed Aris. Re-registered to Liberia. Scrapped at Kobe, Japan in May 1967.

== Edwin H. Duff ==
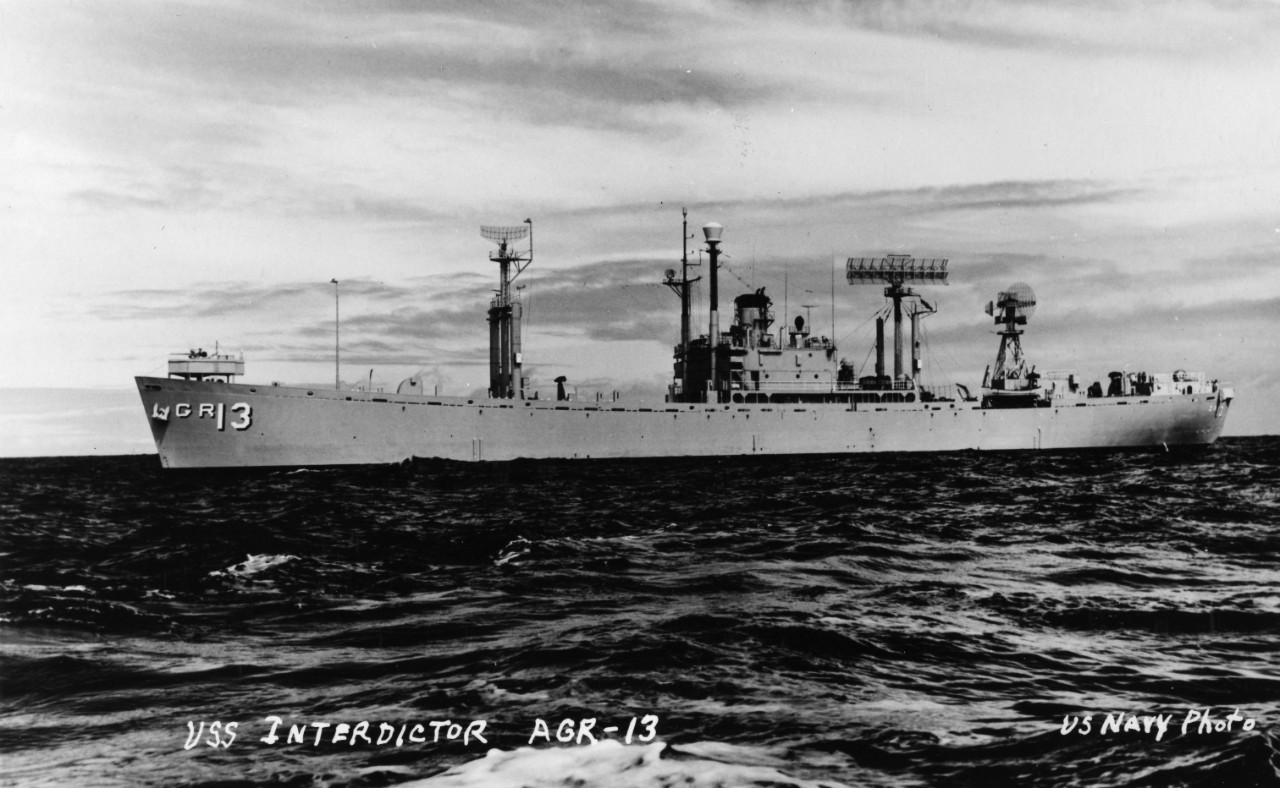
USS Interdictor

Edwin H. Duff was a boxed aircraft transport ship built by J. A. Jones Construction Company, Panama City. Her keel was laid on 18 May 1945. She was launched on 29 June and delivered on 27 July. Laid up in the James River in October 1945, she was acquired by the United States Navy in May 1957 and renamed Interdictor. Converted for naval use at Charleston Naval Shipyard. Laid up in Suisun Bay in September 1965. Sold to a buyer in Portland, Oregon for non-transportation use in June 1974.

== Edwin Joseph O'Hara ==
Edwin Joseph O'Hara was built by California Shipbuilding Corporation. Her keel was laid on 8 July 1943. She was launched at Edwin Joseph O'Hara on 29 July and delivered as Samboon 12 August. Built for the MoWT, she was operated under the management of Cunard White Star Line. Torpedoed and sunk in the Gulf of Aden by I-27 on 10 November 1943 whilst on a voyage from Iquique, Chile to Suez, Egypt.

== Edwin L. Drake ==
Edwin L. Drake was built by Bethlehem Fairfield Shipyard. Her keel was laid on 26 June 1943. She was launched on 31 July and delivered on 10 August. Built for the WSA, she was operated under the management of International Freighting Corp. Sold in 1947 to American Trans-Ocean Navigation Corp., New York. Sold in 1951 to Portsmouth Steamship Corp., New York and renamed Seadrake. Sold in 1954 to Independent Steamship Corp., New York and renamed Phoenix. Sold in 1957 to Atalya Compania Navigation, Panama and renamed Anassa. Re-registered to Liberia and operated under the management of Pan-Range Ship Operating Co. Renamed Praxiteles in 1960. Renamed Dori in 1962 and placed under the management of Standard Marine Ltd. Sprang a leak off Ponta Delgada, Azores on 16 January 1964 whilst on a voyage from Emden, West Germany to New Orleans. She was beached but subsequently sank.

== Edwin L. Godkin ==
Edwin L. Godkin was built by Southeastern Shipbuilding Corporation. Her keel was laid on 19 October 1943. She was launched on 30 November and delivered on 14 December. Built for the WSA, she was operated under the management of Luckenbach Steamship Co. Sold in 1947 to Epirotiki Steamship Navigation Co., Piraeus and renamed Konistra. Sold later that year to Thomas N. Epiphaniades Steamship Co., Piraeus and placed under the management of Nomikos. Management transferred to Furness, Withy & Co. in 1949, then T. P. Rose Richards in 1950. Sold in 1961 to Marestella Compania Navigation, Panama and renamed Eritrea. Still registered in Greece, and placed under the management of Nomikos. Management transferred to Morland Navigation Ltd. in 1963, then to Franco Shipping Co. in 1965. Sold in 1967 to Katerina Compania Navigation, Panama and renamed Erato. Re-registered to Somalia and placed under the management of Franco Shipping Co. Scrapped at Castellón de la Plana, Spain in June 1971.

== Edwin Markham ==
Edwin Markham was built by California Shipbuilding Corporation. Her keel was laid on 18 February 1942. She was launched on 5 May and delivered on 9 June. Laid up in the Hudson River post-war, she was scrapped at Portland, Oregon in May 1965.

== Edwin M. Stanton ==
Edwin M. Stanton was built by Oregon Shipbuilding Corporation. Her keel was laid on 21 July 1942. She was launched on 26 August and delivered on 9 September. Laid up in the Hudson River post-war. She was sold to shipbreakers in Karachi, Pakistan in December 1970, but was resold. Scrapped at Valencia, Spain in October 1971.

== Edwin S. Nettleton ==
Edwin S. Nettleton was built by Todd Houston Shipbuilding Corporation. Her keel was laid on 23 September 1944. She was launched on 28 October and delivered on 9 November. Laid up in the James River post war, she was scuttled off Brunswick on 19 May 1975.

== Edwin T. Meredith ==
Edwin T. Meredith was built by Permanente Metals Corporation. Her keel was laid on 19 May 1943. She was launched on 15 June and delivered on 30 June. Laid up in the James River post-war, she was scrapped at Kearnyy in April 1972.

== Edwin W. Moore ==
Edwin W. Moore was built by Todd Houston Shipbuilding Corporation. Her keel was laid on 6 July 1943. She was launched on 19 August and delivered on 31 August. She was scrapped at Baltimore in March 1960.

== Egbert Benson ==
Egbert Benson was built by California Shipbuilding Corporation. Her keel was laid on 2 April 1942. She was launched on 3 June and delivered on 24 June. Laid up in the Hudson River post-war, she was scrapped at Kearny in November 1970.

== E. G. Hall ==
E. G. Hall was built by Delta Shipbuilding Company. Her keel was laid on 3 June 1944. She was launched on 18 July and delivered on 5 September. She was scrapped at Baltimore in January 1960.

== E. H. Harriman ==
E. H. Harriman was built by Oregon Shipbuilding Corporation. Her keel was laid on 5 February 1943. She was launched on 27 February and delivered on 10 March. To the Soviet Union and renamed Dekabrist. Scrapped at Vladivostok in September 1972.

== E. H. Sothern ==
E. H. Sothern was built by California Shipbuilding Corporation. Her keel was laid on 28 August 1943. She was launched as E. H. Sothern on 19 September and delivered as Sammont on 30 September. To the Ministry of War Transport (MoWT) under Lend-Lease. Operated under the management of William Thompson & Co. Sold in 1947 to Salmonier Shipping Co. and renamed Salmonier. Remained under the same management. Sold in 1949 to Ben Line Steamers Ltd. and renamed Benmhor, remaining under the same management. Sold in 1951 to Compania Maritima Astra, Panama and renamed Armar. Re-registered to Liberia and subsequently placed under the management of Trans-Ocean Steamship Agency. Re-registered to Greece in 1958. Lengthened at Maizuru, Japan in 1961. Now 511 feet 6 inches (155.91 m) long, assessed at 8,527 GRT. Re-registered to Liberia in 1964. Sold in 1967 to Palma Shipping Corp. and renamed Captain George K. Operated under the management of Palmco Shipping Inc. Her hull fractured off the coast of Somaliland (10°03′N 54°06′E) on 25 June 1969 whilst on a voyage from Vancouver, Canada to Eilat, Israel. She put in to Djibouti for temporary repairs. Declared a constructive total loss, she was scrapped at Kaohsiung in November 1969.

== E. Kirby Smith ==
E. Kirby Smith was built by J. A. Jones Construction Company, Panama City. Her keel was laid on 9 July 1942. She was launched on 30 December and delivered on 3 March 1943. She was run into by the Swedish cargo ship Nyland off Norfolk, Virginia on 21 March 1956 and was almost cut in two. She was scrapped at Baltimore in 1956.

== Elbert Hubbard ==
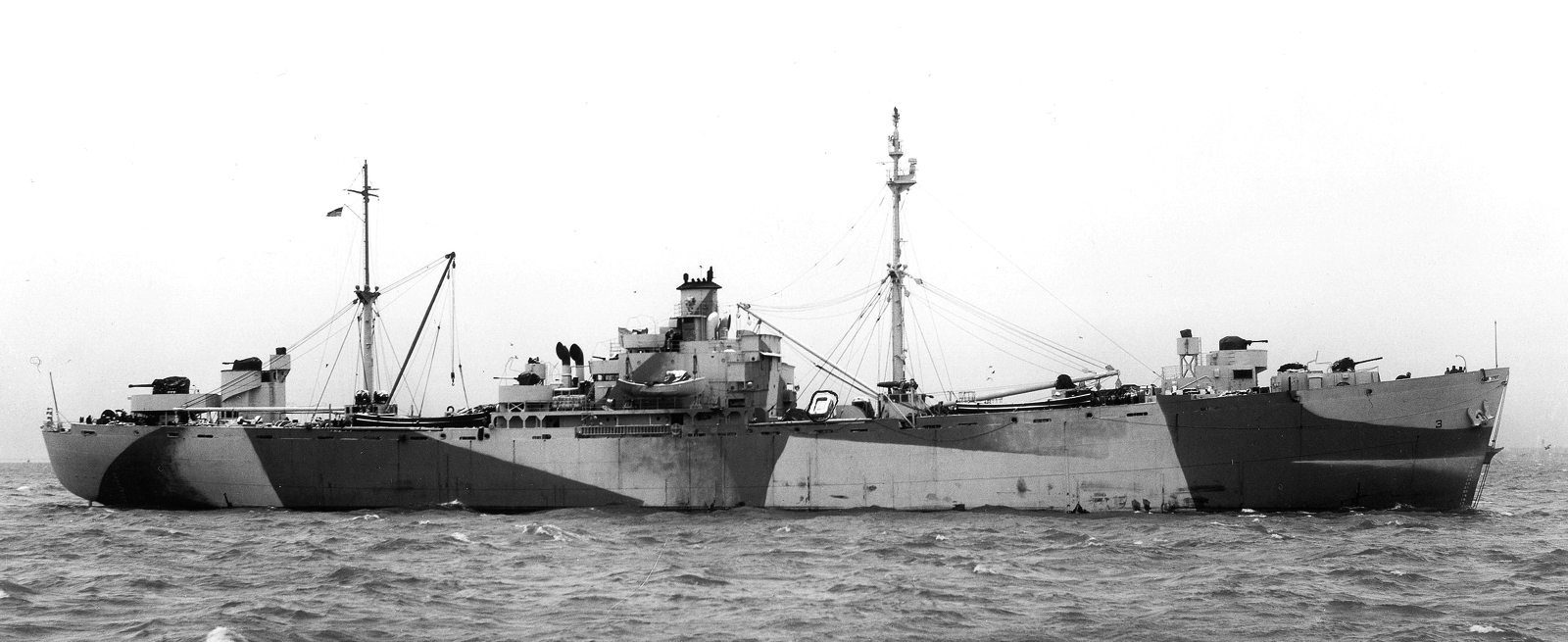
USS Mindanao

Elbert Hubbard was a repair ship built by Bethlehem Fairfield Shipyard. Her keel was laid on 11 April 1943. She was launched as Elbert Hubbard on 13 May and delivered to the United States Navy as Mindanao on 20 May. Severely damaged on 10 November 1944 when USS Mount Hood exploded at Seeadler Harbor, New Guinea. Subsequently repaired and returned to service. Laid up at Orange, Texas in 1946. Moved to Beaumont in 1961 and the James River in 1962. Scuttled off Daytona Beach, Florida in October 1980.

== Elbridge Gerry ==
Elbridge Gerry was built by California Shipbuilding Corporation. Her keel was laid on 22 September 1941. She was launched on 22 February 1942 and delivered on 20 May. She was scrapped in New Orleans in June 1966.

== Eleazar Lord ==
Eleazar Lord was built by Todd Houston Shipbuilding Corporation. Her keel was laid on 19 April 1944. She was launched on 26 May and delivered on 7 June. She was scrapped at Richmond in 1966.

== Eleazar Wheelock ==
Eleazar Wheelock was built by Bethlehem Fairfield Shipyard. Her keel was laid on 4 March 1942. She was launched on 11 May and delivered on 5 June. She was scrapped at Philadelphia in 1964.

== Eleftheria ==
Eleftheria was built by Todd Houston Shipbuilding. Her keel was laid on 18 October 1944. She was launched as I. B. Perrine on 22 November and delivered as Eleftheria on 30 November. She struck a mine at the mouth of the Scheldt on 23 March 1945 whilst on a voyage from Ghent, Belgium to the River Thames. She grounded north of Ostend, Belgium and broke in tow. Her wreck was dispersed in 1952.

== Elias Boudinot ==
Elias Boudinot was built by Delta Shipbuilding Company. Her keel was laid on 27 January 1943. She was launched on 13 March and delivered on 29 March. She was scrapped at Baltimore in March 1962.

== Elias H. Derby ==
Elias H. Derby was built by New England Shipbuilding Corporation. Her keel was laid on 20 September 1943. She was launched as Elias H. Derby on 7 November and delivered as Samlong on 17 November. To MoWT under Lend-Lease. Operated under the management of Prince Line Ltd. Severely damaged 2 nautical miles (3.7 km) off Juno Beach, Normandy, France when attacked by Kriegsmarine Linsen boats on 3 August 1944. Towed to Gravesend, United Kingdom. Declared a constructive total loss and laid up in the River Blackwater. Scrapped at Hendrik-Ido-Ambacht, Netherlands in January 1949.

== Elias Howe ==
Elias Howe was built by Kaiser Company, Vancouver, Washington. Her keel was laid on 22 April 1942. She was launched on 19 July and delivered on 8 August. Built for the WSA, she was operated under the management of Pacific Atlantic Steamship Co. Torpedoed in the Gulf of Aden (11°35′N 45°50′E) by I-10 on 24 September 1943 whilst on a voyage from Valparaíso, Chile to Suez. She exploded and sank.

== Elias Reisberg ==
Elias Reisberg was built by New England Shipbuilding Corporation. Her keel was laid on 24 January 1945. She was launched on 17 March and delivered on 31 March. Registered in France. Sold to the French Government in 1947 and renamed Turckheim. Operated under the management of Compagnie Française de Navigation et Vapeur Chargeurs Réunis. Laid up at Le Havre in 1966. Scrapped at Hamburg, West Germany in May 1968.

== Elihu B. Washburne ==
Elihu B. Washburne was built by California Shipbuilding Corporation. Her keel was laid on 1 December 1942. She was launched on 31 December and delivered on 16 January 1943. Built for the WSA, she was operated under the management of Matson Navigation Co. Torpedoed and sunk in the Atlantic Ocean off the coast of Brazil (24°05′S 45°23′W) by U-513 on 3 July 1943 whilst on a voyage from Lourenço Marques, Mozambique to Rio de Janeiro, Brazil.

== Elihu Root ==
Elihu Root was built by J. A. Jones Construction Company, Panama City. Her keel was laid on 5 October 1942. She was launched on 19 May 1943 and delivered on 18 June. Laid up in the Hudson River post-war, she was scrapped at Kearny in March 1970.

== Elihu Thomson ==
Elihu Thomson was built by Permanente Metals Corporation. Her keel was laid on 23 September 1942. She was launched on 2 November and delivered on 12 November. She was scrapped at Kearny in November 1969.

== Elihu Yale ==
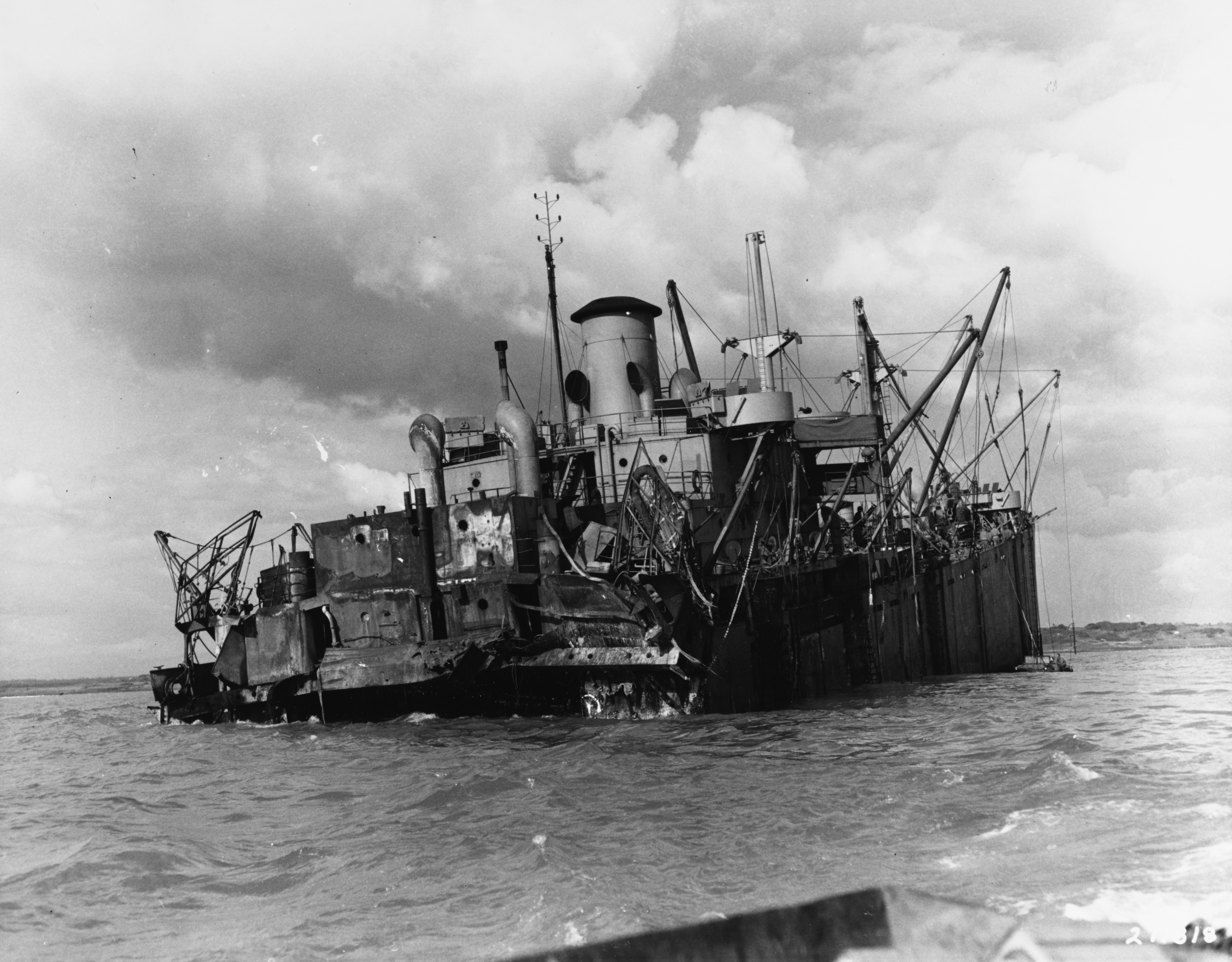
The sunken Elihu Yale.

Elihu Yale was built by Oregon Shipbuilding Corporation. Her keel was laid on 30 April 1942. She was launched on 7 June and delivered on 24 June. Built for the WSA, she was operated under the management of McCormick Steamship Co. Struck by a glide bomb and sunk off Anzio, Italy (41°27′N 12°38′E) on 15 February 1944. Refloated and scrapped in 1947.

== Elijah Cobb ==
Elijah Cobb was built by New England Shipbuilding Corporation. Her keel was laid on 1 August 1944. She was launched on 16 September and delivered on 26 September. She was scrapped at Philadelphia in November 1969.

== Elijah Kellogg ==
Elijah Kellogg was built by New England Shipbuilding Corporation. Her keel was laid on 17 February 1944. She was launched on 5 April and delivered on 11 April. Built for the WSA, she was operated under the management of Blidberg Rothchild Company. Sold in 1947 to Demetrios & Stamatios Fafalios, Chios, Greece and renamed Othon. Ran aground at Karachi on 27 June 1952 whilst on a voyage from Philadelphia to Karachi. She broke in tow and sank the next day.

== Elijah P. Lovejoy ==
Elijah P. Lovejoy was built by Oregon Shipbuilding Corporation. Her keel was laid on 25 February 1943. She was launched on 19 March and delivered on 27 March. To the Soviet Union and renamed Alexander Suvorov. Renamed Aleksandr Suvorov in 1970. Sold to Azov Shipping Co. in 1977. Reported scrapped in 1978. Removed from shipping register in May 1978.

== Elijah White ==
Elijah White was built by Oregon Shipbuilding Corporation. Her keel was laid on 30 June 1942. She was launched on 7 August and delivered on 20 August. She was scrapped at Wilmington, North Carolina in July 1961.

== Elinor Wylie ==
Elinor Wylie was built by California Shipbuilding Corporation. Her keel was laid on 27 December 1943. She was launched on 24 January 1944 and delivered on 10 February. Built for the WSA, she was operated under the management of McCormick Steamship Co. Damaged by a mine in the Mediterranean Sea off the south coast of France (42°59′N 5°35′E) on 6 October 1944 whilst on a voyage from New York to Toulon, France. Towed in to Toulon, then towed to Oran, Algeria, then Marseille, France. Declared a constructive total loss. Temporary repairs made, but she was not considered seaworthy when fully laden. To United States Navy in May 1945, renamed Triana. Converted to a store ship at Pearl Harbor. Sprang a leak in September 1945, temporary repairs made. Returned to WSA in February 1946 and renamed Elinor Wylie. Laid up in Suisun Bay. Scrapped at Oakland in October 1958.

== Eliphalet Nott ==
Eliphalet Nott was built by New England Shipbuilding Corporation. Her keel was laid on 28 November 1942. She was launched on 14 February and delivered on 5 March. She was scrapped in Baltimore in 1954.

== Elisha Graves Otis ==
Elisha Graves Otis was built by Permanente Metals Corporation. Her keel was laid on 7 April 1943. She was launched on 15 May and delivered on 16 May. She was scrapped in Panama City, Florida in September 1964.

== Elisha Mitchell ==
Elisha Mitchell was built by North Carolina Shipbuilding Company. Her keel was laid on 16 February 1943. She was launched on 18 March and delivered on 25 March. She was scrapped in Baltimore in April 1961.

== Elisha P. Ferry ==
Elisha P. Ferry was built by Oregon Shipbuilding Corporation. Her keel was laid on 16 October 1943. She was launched on 5 November and delivered on 14 November. She was scrapped at Tacoma in June 1969.

== Eli Whitney ==
Eli Whitney was built by Permanente Metals Corporation. Her keel was laid on 10 July 1942. She was launched on 26 August and delivered on 12 September. To the United States Navy in 1956, laid up at Beaumont. Scrapped at Brownsville in June 1974.

== Elizabeth Blackwell ==
Elizabeth Blackwell was built by Permanente Metals Corporation. Her keel was laid on 26 February 1943. She was launched on 28 March and delivered on 10 April. Built for the WSA, she was operated under the management of Coastwise Line. Sold in 1947 to Atlantic Maritime Co., Panama and renamed Atlantic Air. Operated under the management of Boyd, Weir & Sewell. Management transferred to Livanos & Co. in 1948, then Maritime Brokers Inc. in 1952. Sold in 1953 to Atlantic Freighters Ltd., Panama. Operated under the management of S. Livanos. Sold in 1962 to Jadranska Slodobna Plovidba, Split, Yugoslavia and renamed Matija Ivanic. Operated under the management of Adriatic Tramp Shipping. Sold in 1966 to Alshipping Corp. and renamed Mar. Re-registered to Liberia and operated under the management of J. Kapsalis. Scrapped at Hualien, Taiwan in July 1967.

== Elizabeth C. Bellamy ==
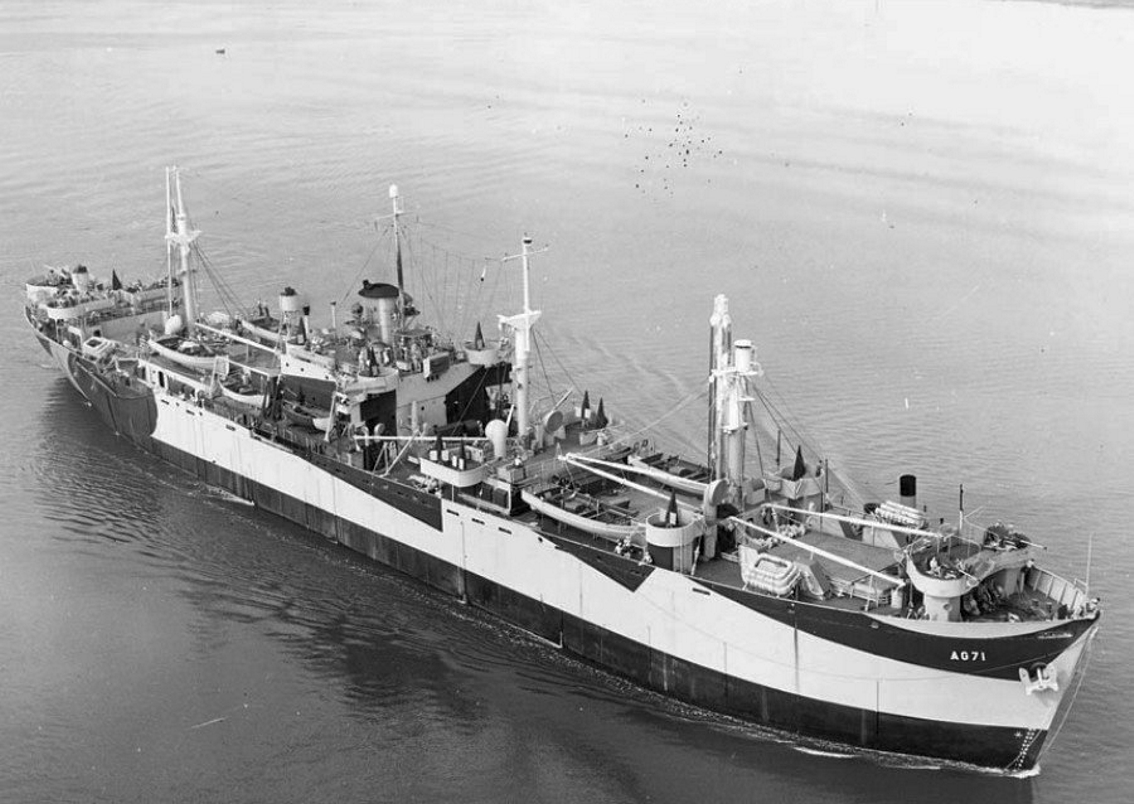
USS Baham

Elizabeth C. Bellamy was built by St. Johns River Shipbuilding Company. Her keel was laid on 10 November 1943. She was launched on 21 December and delivered on 31 December. To United States Navy and renamed Baham. Converted to a distilling, repair and stores ship in March 1944. Converted at Pearl Harbor to a maintenance ship in January 1945. To USMC in June 1947 and renamed Elizabeth C. Bellamy. Laid up in Suisun Bay. Scrapped at Terminal Island in February 1973.

== Eliza Jane Nicholson ==
Eliza Jane Nicholson was a tanker built by Delta Shipbuilding Company. Her keel was laid on 27 August 1943. She was launched on 9 October and delivered on 27 November. Built for the WSA, she was operated under the management of Bernuth-Lembcke Company, New York. Sold to her managers in 1947. Sold in 1954 to Alonso Compania Navigation, Panama and renamed Aetna. Re-registered to Liberia and operated under the management of Triton Shipping Line. Converted to a cargo ship at Amsterdam, Netherlands in 1955. Now assessed at 7,192 GRT Sold in 1956 to Drury LS Steamship Co., Rotterdam, Netherlands and renamed Drury L. S. Remained registered in Liberia. Sold in 1958 to Stef Shipping Corp. and renamed Irini Stefanou. Still registered in Liberia, and operated under the management of Northern Ships Agency. Ran aground off the Islas San Benito, Mexico (28°18′N 115°34′W) on 4 February 1965 whilst on a voyage from Vancouver, Canada to London. Refloated on 25 February and towed in to Los Angeles. Declare a constructive total loss, she was sold for scrapping at Terminal Island in February 1967.

== Elmer A. Sperry ==
Elmer A. Sperry was built by Oregon Shipbuilding Corporation. Her keel was laid on 30 September 1942. She was launched on 27 October and delivered on 7 November. She was scrapped at Portland, Oregon in June 1963.

== Eloy Alfaro ==
Eloy Alfaro

Eloy Alfaro was built by Bethlehem Fairfield Shipyard. Her keel was laid on 18 December 1943. She was launched on 19 January 1944 and delivered on 28 January. Built for the WSA, she was operated under the management of Smith & Johnson. Sold in 1947 to Honduras Shipping Co., Tecucigalpa, Honduras and renamed Norluna. Renamed Eloy Alfaro in 1948 then Norluna in 1950. Sold later that year to Eagle Steamship Co., Panama and renamed Aurora. Operated under the management of Stephen Perry. Management transferred to Eastern Steamship Agency in 1955 then Phoenix Maritime Agencies in 1961. Re-registered to Greece in 1963. Sprang a leak in the Atlantic Ocean 300 nautical miles (560 km) east of Cape Race, Canada on 18 May 1966 whilst on a voyage from Hamburg to Montreal, Canada. Abandoned by her crew, she was presumed to have sunk.

== Elwin F. Knowles ==
Elwin F. Knowles was built by New England Shipbuilding Corporation. Her keel was laid on 22 February 1945. She was launched on 14 April and delivered on 24 April. Built for the WSA, she was operated under the management of Agwilines Inc. Sold in 1947 to States Marine Corp., New York and renamed Peach Tree State. Sold in 1954 to Maritima Unidas, Panama and renamed Zuider Zee. Re-registered to Liberia. Sold in 1955 to Agualinda Compania Navigation, Panama. Still registered in Liberia, and operated under the management of Mercantile Navigation Co. Sold in 1961 to Southern States Navigation Corp. and renamed Westchester. Re-registered to the United States and operated under the management of Peninsular Navigation Corp. Sold in 1963 to Seacrest Investment Co. and renamed Mercantile Wave. Re-registered to Liberia and operated under the management of Mercantil Navigation Co. Sold in 1964 to Orient Star Navigation Corp., Taipei, Taiwan and renamed Grand Star. Re-registered to China, then to Taiwan in 1965. Scrapped at Kaohsiung in 1968.

== Elwood Haynes ==
Elwood Haynes was built by Permanente Metals Corporation. Her keel was laid on 7 January 1944. She was launched on 26 January and delivered on 31 January. Built for the WSA, she was operated under the management of American-Hawaiian Steamship Company. Sold in 1947 to Achille Lauro, Naples, Italy and renamed Laura Lauro. Scrapped at La Spezia, Italy in January 1969.

== Elwood Mead ==
Elwood Mead was built by Oregon Shipbuilding Corporation. Her keel was laid on 18 December 1943. She was launched on 5 January 1944 and delivered on 15 January. Built for the WSA, she was operated under the management of Interocean Steamship Corp. Sold in 1947 to Goulandris Bros., Piraeus and renamed Ioannis P. Goulandris. Scrapped at Itozaki, Japan in November 1968.

== Emile Berliner ==
Emile Berliner was built by Permanente Metals Corporation. Her keel was laid on 6 August 1943. She was launched on 28 August and delivered on 6 September. Built for the WSA, she was operated under the management of United Fruit Company. Sold in 1947 to Helsingfors Steamship Co., Helsinki and renamed Frostvik. Operated under the management of A/B Benima O/Y. Sold in 1950 to Rederibolaget Re-Be, Helsinki and renamed Arneta. Sold in 1956 to A/B Wilhelm Bensow O/Y, Helsinki. Sold inn 1963 to Paulin A/B Chartering O/Y & Co., Helsinki and renamed Susan Paulin. Sold in 1965 to Astorico Compania Navigation, Panama and renamed Kyra. Re-registered to Liberia and operated under the management of Cape Shipping Co. Scrapped at Bilbao in May 1969.

== Emilian Pugachev ==
Emilian Pugachev was built by Oregon Shipbuilding Corporation. Her keel was laid on 24 March 1943. She was launched as Louis Agassiz on 13 April and delivered as Emilian Pugachev on 21 April. Transferred to the Soviet Union. Renamed Yemelyan Pugachnyov in 1977. Scrapped in the Soviet Union in June 1977.

== Emily Dickinson ==
Emily Dickinson was built by New England Shipbuilding Corporation. Her keel was laid on 26 February 1943. She was launched on 26 April and delivered on 7 May. She was scrapped at Kearny in July 1969.

== Emma Lazarus ==
Emma Lazarus was built by Bethlehem Fairfield Shipyard. Her keel was laid on 28 July 1943. She was launched as Emma Lazarus on 22 August and delivered as Samara on 30 August. To MoWT under Lend-Lease, operated under the management of Bucknall Steamship Co. Renamed Samshire in 1943. Sold in 1947 to Ellerman Lines Ltd. and renamed City of Doncaster. Remained under the same management. Management transferred to City Line Ltd. in 1951. Sold in 1961 to Trader Line Ltd., Bermuda and renamed Pembroke Trader. Remained registered in the UK, and operated under the management of Moller Line Ltd. Sold in 1966 to Doreen Steamship Corp., Panama and renamed Galletta. Re-registered to Liberia and operated under the management of Fuji Marden & Co. Ran aground 60 nautical miles (110 km) off Chalna, East Pakistan (21°48′N 94°00′E) on10 April 1970 whilst on a voyage from Chittagong to Chalna. Refloated on 21 May and towed in to Chalna. Scrapped in Hong Kong in August 1970.

== Emma Willard ==
Emma Willard was built by New England Shipbuilding Corporation. Her keel was laid on 1 February 1943. She was launched on 5 April and delivered on 22 April. Built for the WSA, she was operated under the management of Eastern Gas & Fuel Associates. To the French Government in 1946. Operated under the management of Compagnie des Messageries Maritimes. Renamed Saint Nazaire in 1947. Sold in 1961 to Marformento Compania Navigation, Panama and renamed Aghia Sophia. Re-registered to Greece and operated under the management of Bray Shipping Co. Scrapped at Hong Kong in March 1968.

== Emmet D. Boyle ==
Emmet D. Boyle was built by Permanente Metals Corporation. Her keel was laid on 6 April 1944. She was launched on 25 April and delivered on 3 May. To the Soviet Union in 1944 and renamed Ingul. Renamed Ingul II in 1950. Presumed scrapped in 1964, deleted from shipping register in 1968.

== Empire Liberty ==
Empire Liberty was the prototype Liberty ship. She was built by J. L. Thompson & Sons, Sunderland, United Kingdom. She was launched on 23 August 1941 and completed in November. Built for the MoWT. To the Greek government in 1943 and renamed Kyklades. Renamed Mentor in 1947 and placed under the management of H. C. Dracoulis. Scrapped at Osaka in October 1960.

== Enoch Train ==
Enoch Train was built by New England Shipbuilding Corporation. Her keel was laid on 23 August 1943. She was launched on 12 October and delivered on 23 October. She was scrapped in New Orleans in 1966.

== Enos A. Mills ==
Enos A. Mills was built by Oregon Shipbuilding Corporation. Her keel was laid on 15 November 1943. She was launched on 4 December and delivered on 19 December. She was scrapped at Tampa in July 1961.

== Ephraim Brevard ==
Ephraim Brevard was built by North Carolina Shipbuilding Company. Her keel was laid on 24 December 1942. She was launched on 24 January 1943 and delivered on 3 February. Laid up at Mobile post-war, she was scrapped at Panama City, Florida in February 1972.

== Ephraim W. Baughman ==
Ephraim W. Baughman was built by Oregon Shipbuilding Corporation. Her keel was laid on 21 May 1943. She was launched on 10 June and delivered on 18 June. She was scrapped at Philadelphia in May 1960.

== Erastus Smith ==
Erastus Smith was built by Todd Houston Shipbuilding. Her keel was laid on 19 July 1943. She was launched on 6 September and delivered on 25 September. Built for the WSA, she was operated under the management of United Fruit Company. Sold in 1947 to Livanos Bros. Maritime Co., Chios and renamed Kyma. Placed under the management of Economou & Co. in 1952. Sold in 1960 to Orient Shipping Corp. and renamed Rodos. Re-registered to Liberia and operated under the management of General Maritime Agency. Scrapped at Shanghai in September 1967.

== Eric V. Hauser ==
Eric V. Hauser was built by Oregon Shipbuilding Corporation. Her keel was laid on 30 April 1943. She was launched on 19 May and delivered on 27 May. Built for the WSA, she was operated under the management of James Griffiths & Sons. Sold in 1947 to Compania Centro Americano de Comercio y Navigation, Panama and renamed Ivy G. Sold in 1948 to Atlantica Compania Maritima, Panama and renamed Libertad. Operated under the management of Orion Shipping & Trading Co. Management transferred to Norlands Shipping & Trading Corp. in 1954. Sold in 1963 to Bahia Dulci Compania Armadora, Panama and renamed Fairwinds. Operated under the management of Stathatos & Co. Scrapped at Split in February 1967.

== Erevan ==
Erevan was built by Oregon Shipbuilding Corporation. Her keel was laid on 15 June 1943. She was launched as Joseph Watt on 4 July and delivered as Erevan on 13 July. Transferred to the Soviet Union. Delivered to a shipyard at Vladivostok for scrapping in May 1975.

== Ernest L. Dawson ==
Ernest L. Dawson was built by New England Shipbuilding Corporation. Her keel was laid on 22 February 1945. She was launched on 14 April and delivered on 2 May. Registered in France. To the French Government in 1946 and renamed Pont l'Eveque. Operated under the management of CGT. Management transferred to Compagnie Havraise de Navigation in 1961, then Sociètè Navale Delmas in 1965. Scrapped at Gandia, Spain in February 1972.

== Ernest W. Gibson ==
Ernest W. Gibson was built by New England Shipbuilding Corporation. Her keel was laid on 24 April 1944. She was launched on 10 June and delivered on 2 July. Built for the WSA, she was operated under the management of International Freighting Corp. Management transferred to W. J. Rountree & Co. in 1946. Laid up in 1949, then sold in 1951 to Three Oceans Steamship Corp., New York and renamed Westchester. Renamed North Pilot in 1953 and placed under the management of Orion Shipping & Trading Co. Sold in 1957 to Ayalgo Compania Navigation, Panama and renamed Pilot. Re-registered to Liberia and operated under the management of Adamanthos Ship Operating Co. Renamed Korthi later that year. Renamed Rogo in 1960. Re-registered to Greece and operated under the management of Syros Shipping Co., London. Sold to her managers in 1962 and placed under the management of L. M. Valmas & Son. Sold in 1963 to Gotham Compania Navigation SA., Panama. Remaining under the same management. Renamed Korthi in 1966. Scrapped at Hirao in October 1969.

== Esek Hopkins ==
Esek Hopkins was built by Bethlehem Fairfield Shipyard. Her keel was laid on 28 January 1942. She was launched on 27 April and delivered on 23 May. She was scrapped at Kearney in November 1967.

== Ethan A. Hitchcock ==
Ethan A. Hitchcock was built by Permanente Metals Corporation. Her keel was laid on 3 October 1943. She was launched on 25 October and delivered on 31 October. Laid up at Mobile post-war, she was scrapped at Panama City, Florida in August 1972.

== Ethan Allen ==
Ethan Allen was built by New England Shipbuilding Corporation. Her keel was laid on 7 January 1942. She was launched on 16 August and delivered on 31 August. She was scrapped at Baltimore in March 1960.

== Ethelbert Nevin ==
Ethelbert Nevin was built by St. Johns River Shipbuilding Company. Her keel was laid on 1 June 1944. She was launched on 18 July and delivered on 30 July. She was scrapped at Baltimore in March 1960.

== Eugene B. Daskam ==
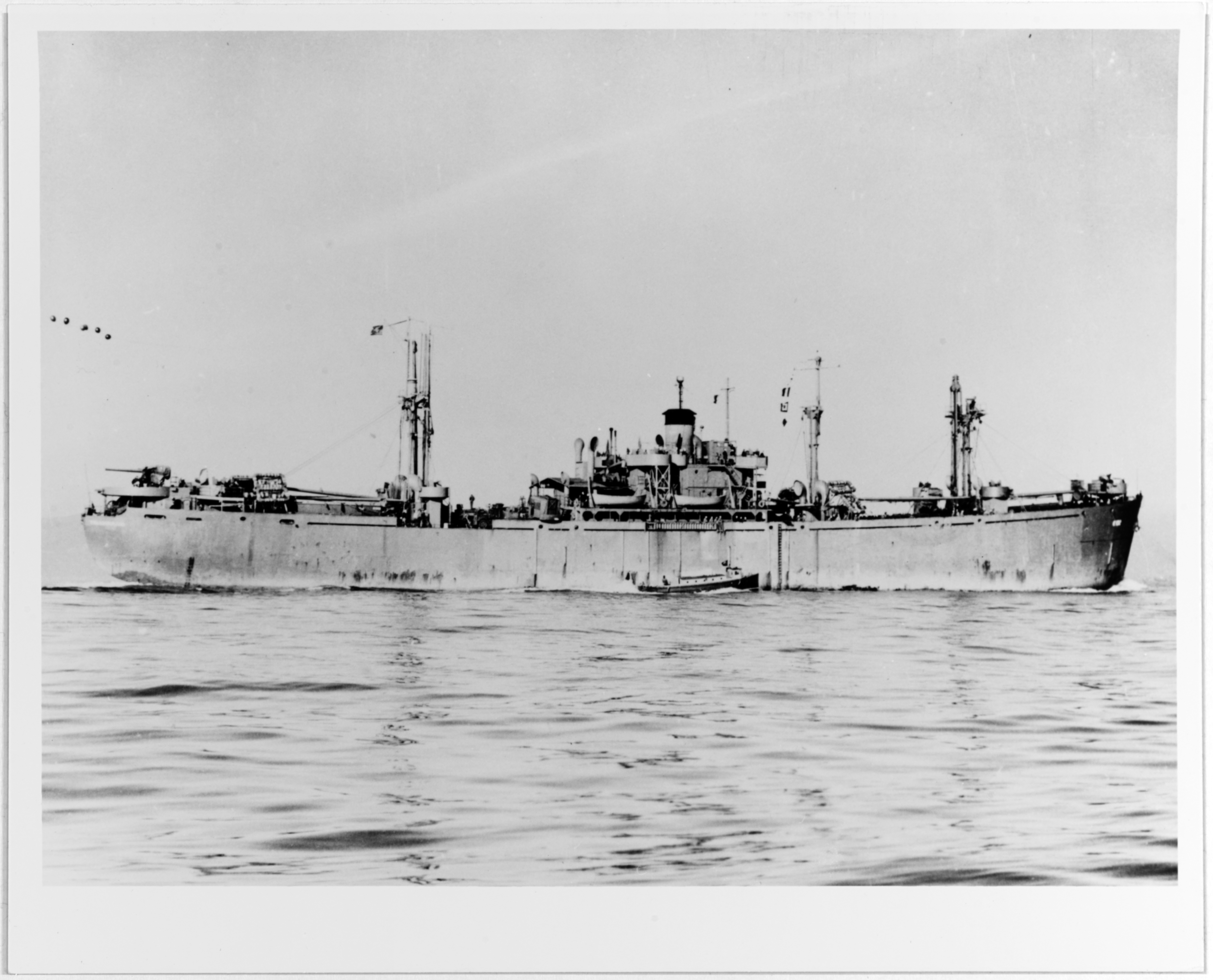
USS Triangulum

Eugene B. Daskam was built by California Shipbuilding Corporation. Her keel was laid on 14 May 1943. She was launched on 6 June and delivered on 20 June. To the United States Navy as Triangulum. Converted for naval use at Naval Base San Diego. Placed in reserve at Pearl Harbor in December 1945. Returned to USMC in July 1947, towed to San Francisco and laid up in Suisin Bay. Renamed Eugene B. Daskam. Sold to buyer in California in March 1973 for scrapping outside the United States.

== Eugene E. O'Donnell ==
Eugene E. O'Donnell was built by New England Shipbuilding Corporation. Her keel was laid on 6 November 1943. She was launched on 20 December and delivered on 30 December. Built for the WSA, she was operated under the management of Eastern Steamship Co. To the Dutch Government in 1947 and renamed Spinoza. Renamed Loenerkerk later that year and placed under the management of Vereenigde Nederlandsche Scheepvaart Maatschappij. Sold to her managers in 1950. Sold in 1961 to Akiramar Compania Navigation, Panama and renamed Marika. RefRe-registered agged to Lebanon and operated under the management of Franco Shipping Co. Sold in 1967 to Cape Greco Shipping Co., Famagusta, Cyprus and placed under the management of Carapanayoti & Co. Management transferred to Shipping & Produce Co. in 1968. Scrapped at Cartagena, Spain in April 1971.

== Eugene Field ==
Eugene Field was built by New England Shipbuilding Corporation. Her keel was laid on 15 March 1943. She was launched on 13 May and delivered on 22 May. She was scrapped at Baltimore in 1960.

== Eugene Hale ==
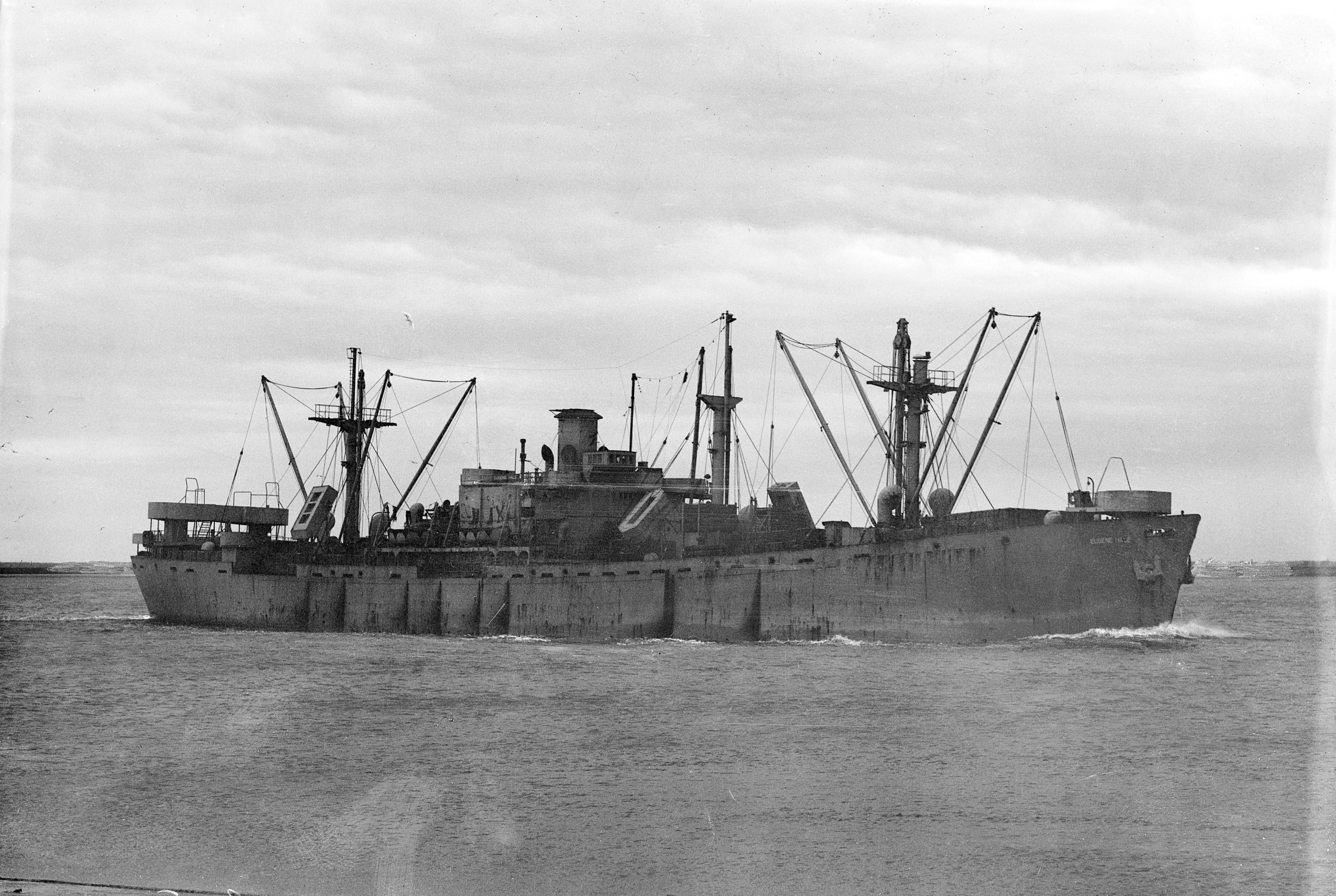
Eugene Hale, probably in the Scheldt

Eugene Hale was built by New England Shipbuilding Corporation. Her keel was laid on 15 April 1943. She was launched on 7 June and delivered on 17 June. She was scrapped at Panama City, Florida in February 1968.

== Eugene Skinner ==
Eugene Skinner was built by Oregon Shipbuilding Corporation. Her keel was laid on 23 June 1942. She was launched on 31 July and delivered on 14 August. Laid up in Puget Sound post-war, she was scrapped at Tacoma in February 1971.

== Eugene T. Chamberlain ==
Eugene T. Chamberlain was built by J. A. Jones Construction Company, Brunswick. Her keel was laid on 19 June 1944. She was launched on 1 August and delivered on 13 August. Built for the WSA, she was operated under the management of Isbrandtsen Steamship Co. Inc. Scheduled for scrapping in 1966, but scrapping delayed due to Vietnam War. Scrapped at Philadelphia in January 1969.

== Eugene W. Hilgard ==
Eugene W. Hilgard was a tanker built by Delta Shipbuilding Company. Her keel was laid on 31 October 1943. She was launched on 15 December and delivered on 13 January 1944. To the United States Navy, renamed Whippet. Returned to WSA in July 1946 and renamed Eugene W. Hilgard. Laid up in Suisun Bay. Sold in 1951 to Hilgard Tanker Corp., New York. Sold in 1955 to Rio Azul Compania Armamente, Panama and renamed Loida. Re-registered to Liberia and placed under the management of Trans-Ocean Steamship Agency. Converted to a cargo ship at Savannah. Lengthened at Kobe in 1956. Now 511 feet 6 inches (155.91 m) long and assessed at 8,536 GRT. An ore carrier, she was sold in 1965 to Astra Carriers Corp., Lugano and renamed Nervion. Remained registered in Liberia. Scrapped at Kaohsiung in April 1971.

== Ewing Young ==
Ewing Young was built by California Shipbuilding Corporation. Her keel was laid on 30 June 1942. She was launched on 13 August and delivered on 30 August. She was scrapped at Hirao in November 1959.

== Ezra Cornell ==
Ezra Cornell was built by New England Shipbuilding Corporation. Her keel was laid on4 January 1943. She was launched on 7 March and delivered on 27 March. A troop carrier, she was built for the WSA and operated under the management of R. A. Nicol & Co. To the French Government in 1947 and renamed Isigny. Operated under the management of CGT. Management transferred to Compagnie Française de Navigation et Vapeur Chargeurs Réunis in 1950. Sold in 1965 to Northern General Marine Corp., Monrovia and renamed Odysion. Re-registered to Greece and operated under the management of General Marine Agency. Sprang a leak 200 nautical miles (370 km) west of Luderitz, South West Africa on 22 December 1967 whilst on a voyage from Ancona, Turkey to Shanghai. Abandoned by her crew, she sank in the Atlantic Ocean south of Walvis Bay (approximately 25°49′S 11°13′E) the next day.

== Ezra Meech ==
Ezra Meech was built by New England Shipbuilding Corporation. Her keel was laid on 18 November 1944. She was launched on 15 January 1945 and delivered on 27 January. Built for the WSA, she was operated under the management of Dichmann, Wright & Pugh, Inc. Sold in 1951 to Gulf Cargo Carriers Corp., New York and renamed Liberty Flag. Sold in 1956 to Actium Shipping Corp., New York and renamed Rion. Sold in 1958 to Mark Klosty & Co., New York and renamed Maurice George. Sold later that year to World Carriers Inc., and renamed Pacific Carrier. Operated under the management of World Tramping Agencies. Sold in 1960 to Eagle Shipping Ltd., New York and renamed Montego Sky. Sold in 1961 to Sky Shipping Ltd. and renamed Aspis. Re-registered to Greece and operated under the management of Standard Marine Ltd. Sold in 1963 to Albatross Shipping & Trading Corp. and renamed Helen K. Re-registered to Liberia and operated under the management of Pacific Steamship Agency. Scrapped at Hirao in September 1967.

== Ezra Meeker ==
Ezra Meeker was built by Oregon Shipbuilding Corporation. Her keel was laid on 25 November 1942. She was launched on 19 December and delivered on 27 December. Laid up at Mobile post-war. she was scrapped at Panama City, Florida in April 1969.

== Ezra Weston ==
Ezra Weston was built by New England Shipbuilding Corporation. Her keel was laid on 8 June 1943. She was launched on 28 July and delivered on 11 August. Built for the WSA, she was operated under the management of International Freighting Co. Torpedoed and sunk in the English Channel (50°47′N 5°03′W) by U-667 on 8 August 1944 whilst on a voyage from Avonmouth, United Kingdom to Normandy.

== Sources ==
- Mitchell, W. H.; Sawyer, L. A. (1990). The Empire Ships. London, New York, Hamburg, Hong Kong: Lloyd's of London Press Ltd. ISBN 1-85044-275-4.
- Sawyer, L. A.; Mitchell, W. H. (1985). The Liberty Ships (2nd ed.). London: Lloyd's of London Press Ltd. ISBN 1-85044-049-2.
