= SS Edward K. Collins =

World War II Liberty ship of the United States

History

United States
- Name: Edward K. Collins
- Namesake: Edward K. Collins
- Owner: War Shipping Administration (WSA)
- Operator: Smith & Johnson
- Ordered: as type (EC2-S-C1) hull, MC hull 2315
- Builder: J.A. Jones Construction, Panama City, Florida
- Cost: $1,014,445
- Yard number: 56
- Way number: 1
- Laid down: 14 July 1944
- Launched: 17 August 1944
- Sponsored by: Mrs.Emily Collins
- Completed: 31 August 1944
- Identification: Call sign: WSUZ
- Fate: Laid up in the National Defense Reserve Fleet, in James River Reserve Fleet, Lee Hall, Virginia, 21 May 1946; Sold for commercial use, 9 December 1946, withdrawn from fleet, 10 January 1947

General characteristics
- Class & type: Liberty ship; type EC2-S-C1, standard
- Tonnage: 10,865 LT DWT; 7,176 GRT
- Displacement: 3,380 long tons (3,434 t) (light); 14,245 long tons (14,474 t) (max)
- Length: 441 feet 6 inches (135 m) oa; 416 feet (127 m) pp; 427 feet (130 m) lwl
- Beam: 57 feet (17 m)
- Draft: 27 ft 9.25 in (8.4646 m)
- Installed power: 2 × Oil fired 450 °F (232 °C) boilers, operating at 220 psi (1,500 kPa); 2,500 hp (1,900 kW)
- Propulsion: 1 × triple-expansion steam engine, (manufactured by General Machinery Corp., Hamilton, Ohio); 1 × screw propeller
- Speed: 11.5 knots (21.3 km/h; 13.2 mph)
- Capacity: 562,608 cubic feet (15,931 m^{3}) (grain); 499,573 cubic feet (14,146 m^{3}) (bale)
- Complement: 38–62 USMM; 21–40 USNAG
- Armament: Varied by ship; Bow-mounted 3-inch (76 mm)/50-caliber gun; Stern-mounted 4-inch (102 mm)/50-caliber gun; 2–8 × single 20-millimeter (0.79 in) Oerlikon anti-aircraft (AA) cannons and/or, 2–8 × 37-millimeter (1.46 in) M1 AA guns

SS Edward K. Collins was a Liberty ship built in the United States during World War II. She was named after US Army Lieutenant Colonel Edward K. Collins.

== Construction ==
Edward K. Collins was laid down on 14 July 1944, under a Maritime Commission (MARCOM) contract, MC hull 2315, by J.A. Jones Construction, Panama City, Florida; sponsored by Mrs. Emily Collins, wife of the namesake; and launched on 17 August 1944.

== History ==
She was allocated to Smith & Johnson, 31 August 1944. On 21 May 1946, she was laid up in the James River Reserve Fleet, Lee Hall, Virginia.

She was sold, on 9 December 1946, for $556,542.74, for commercial use, to Kassos Steam Navigation Company. She was withdrawn from the fleet on 10 January 1947.

== Bibliography ==
- "Jones Construction, Panama City FL". www.ShipbuildingHistory.com. 13 October 2010.
- Maritime Administration. "Edward K. Collins". Ship History Database Vessel Status Card. U.S. Department of Transportation, Maritime Administration. This article incorporates text from this source, which is in the public domain.
- Davies, James (May 2004). "Specifications (As-Built)" (PDF). p. 23.
- "SS Edward K. Collins".
