= USS Triangulum =

Cargo ship of the United States Navy

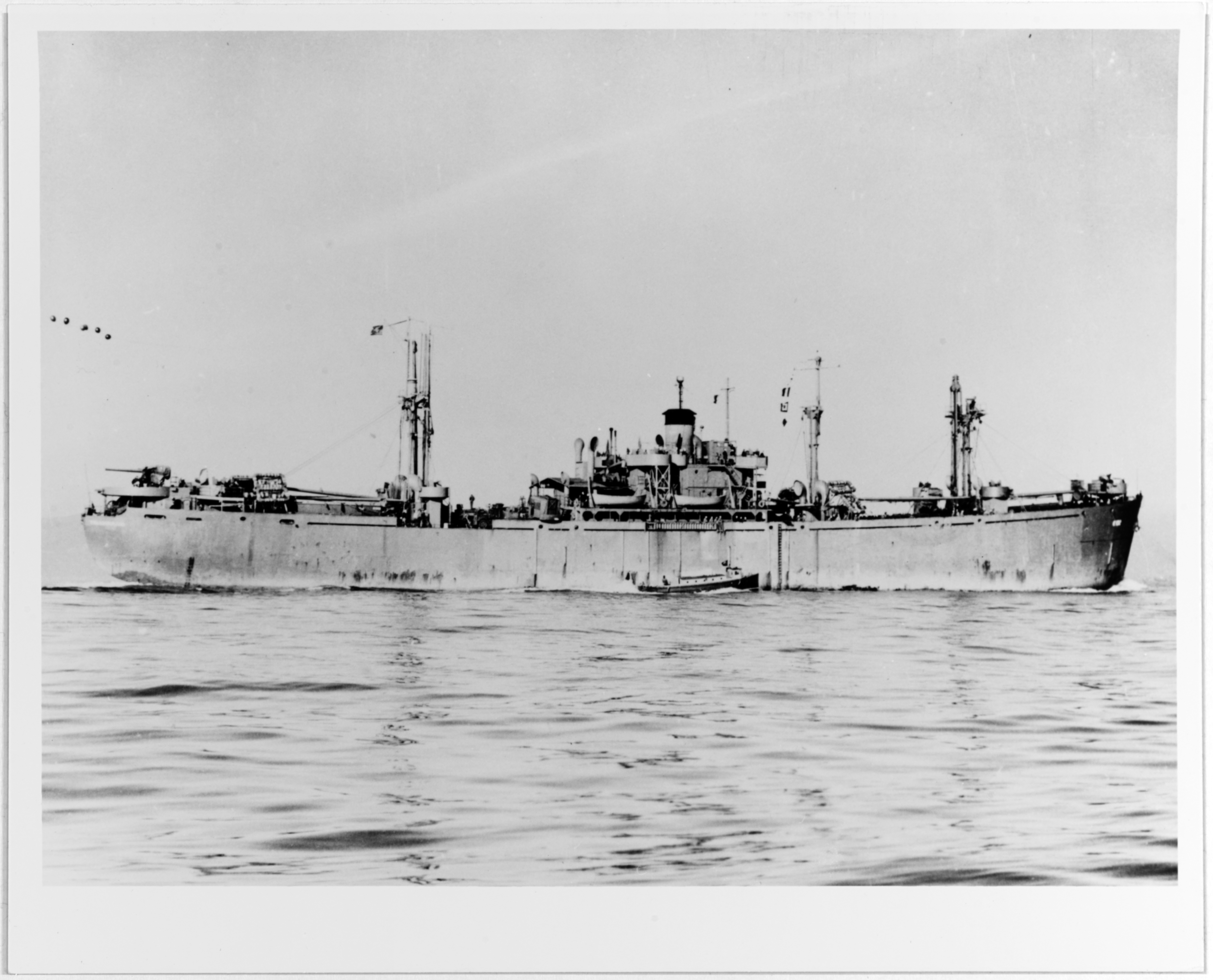
- USS Triangulum (AK-102) (1943–1947)

History

United States
- Name: Eugene B. Daskam; Triangulum
- Namesake: Eugene B. Daskam; The constellation Triangulum
- Ordered: as a Type EC2-S-C1 hull, MCE hull 1669
- Builder: California Shipbuilding Corporation, Terminal Island, Los Angeles, California
- Yard number: 202
- Way number: 8
- Laid down: 14 May 1943
- Launched: 6 June 1943
- Acquired: 19 June 1943
- Commissioned: 30 July 1943
- Decommissioned: 15 April 1946
- Renamed: Triangulum, on 27 May 1943
- Stricken: 17 July 1947
- Identification: Hull symbol: AK-102; Code letters: NTWF
- Honors and awards: 2 × battle stars
- Fate: returned to MARCOM, sold for scrapping, 19 March 1973, withdrawn, 27 July 1973

General characteristics
- Class & type: Crater-class cargo ship
- Type: Type EC2-S-C1
- Displacement: 4,023 long tons (4,088 t) (standard); 14,550 long tons (14,780 t) (full load)
- Length: 441 ft 6 in (134.57 m)
- Beam: 56 ft 11 in (17.35 m)
- Draft: 28 ft 4 in (8.64 m)
- Installed power: 2 × Babcock & Wilcox header-type boilers, 220psi 450°; 2,500 shp (1,900 kW)
- Propulsion: 1 × Joshua Hendy vertical triple-expansion reciprocating steam engine; 1 × shaft
- Speed: 12.5 kn (23.2 km/h; 14.4 mph)
- Capacity: 7,800 t (7,700 long tons) DWT; 444,206 cu ft (12,578.5 m^{3}) (non-refrigerated)
- Complement: 16 officers 190 enlisted
- Armament: 1 × 5 in (127 mm)/38 caliber dual purpose (DP) gun; 4 × 40 mm (1.57 in) Bofors anti-aircraft (AA) gun mounts; 6 × 20 mm (0.79 in) Oerlikon cannons AA gun mounts

USS Triangulum (AK-102) was a Crater-class cargo ship commissioned by the US Navy for service in World War II. Triangulum was named after the constellation Triangulum. She was responsible for delivering troops, goods and equipment to locations in the Asiatic-Pacific Theater.

== Construction ==
Triangulum was laid down 14 May 1943, under Maritime Commission (MARCOM) contract, MC hull No. 1669, as the Liberty ship SS Eugene B. Daskam, by California Shipbuilding Corporation, Terminal Island, Los Angeles, California; renamed Triangulum 27 May 1943; launched 6 June 1943; sponsored by Mrs. D. H. Mann; acquired by the Navy on 19 June 1943, from the War Shipping Administration (WSA) on a "bareboat" basis; converted to Navy use at the Destroyer Base, San Diego, California; and commissioned on 30 July 1943.

== Service history ==
The ship was one of five Navy manned Liberties assigned 8 December 1943, to the Southwest Pacific Area for service under operational control of the Commander, US Seventh Fleet in meeting US Army requirements. Assigned to the Naval Transportation Service (NTS), the auxiliary cargo ship moved up the coast to load cargo at San Francisco, California, and stood out to sea with a convoy on 28 August, bound for the New Hebrides. She arrived at Espiritu Santo on 2 October, and, for the next five months, shuttled troops and cargo between ports in Australia and New Guinea.

=== Landing troops at Humboldt Bay ===
Triangulum embarked part of a battalion of Army combat engineers at Lae and sortied on 14 April 1944, with Task Group (TG) 77.1, the Western Attack Group, for the invasion of Hollandia. On the morning of 22 April, she began landing her 700 troops on the beaches of Humboldt Bay. The ship completed discharging cargo by 18:00 the next day and departed in a convoy bound, via Buna, for Milne Bay. She then resumed her supply runs between Australia and New Guinea.

=== Supplying the troops during the Philippine invasion ===
The ship loaded combat cargo at Manus and got underway for Hollandia on 7 November, to rendezvous with a convoy proceeding to the Philippines. She arrived at Leyte Gulf on 19 November, and began discharging supplies. During her visit there, Japanese planes frequently attacked Allied shipping; and, during a raid on Thanksgiving Day, four of her men were wounded by friendly antiaircraft fire.

=== End-of-war activity ===
On 4 December, she departed the area for Australia and, after calling at Hollandia, arrived at Brisbane, Australia, on 17 December 1944. Triangulum shuttled supplies from Australia to South Pacific bases, mostly in New Guinea, for the next year. The supply runs were broken by three voyages to the Philippines: in January, May, and August 1945. On 8 November, she stood out of Leyte to load cargo at Hollandia, Biak, Milne Bay, and Manus to be transported to the United States.

== Post-war decommissioning ==
On December 31, 1945, the ship arrived at San Francisco, where she was stripped for inactivation and ordered to join the Reserve Fleet in Hawaii. Triangulum arrived at Pearl Harbor on 23 February 1946, and was decommissioned there on 15 April. In May 1947, she was towed back to San Francisco and returned to MARCOM on 2 July. Triangulum was struck from the Navy list on 17 July 1947.

On 19 March 1973, she was sold to Nicolai Joffe Corporation, for $168,113, to be scrapped within 24 months. She was withdrawn from the fleet 27 July 1973.

== Awards ==
Triangulum received two battle stars for World War II service. Her crew was eligible for the following medals:

- Combat Action Ribbon (retroactive)
- American Campaign Medal
- Asiatic-Pacific Campaign Medal (2)
- World War II Victory Medal
- Philippines Liberation Medal

== Notes ==
Citations

== Bibliography ==
Online resources

- "Triangulum". Dictionary of American Naval Fighting Ships. Naval History and Heritage Command. This article incorporates text from this source, which is in the public domain.
- "California Shipbuilding, Los Angeles CA". www.ShipbuildingHistory.com. 13 October 2010.
- "USS Triangulum (AK-102)". NavSource. 6 September 2013.
- "TRIANGULUM (AK-102)". United States Department of Transportation. Archived from the original on December 12, 2019.
- "EUGENE B. DASKAM". United States Department of Transportation. Archived from the original on December 12, 2019.

Books

- Masterson, Dr. James R. (1949). U. S. Army Transportation In The Southwest Pacific Area 1941-1947. Washington, D. C.: Transportation Unit, Historical Division, Special Staff, U. S. Army.
