= SS Emile Berliner =

SS Emile Berliner (HIN 2139) was a World War II American Liberty ship which assisted the transport of group materials used by the United States Army Air Forces' 509th Composite Group during Operation Alberta in Tinian, Northern Marianas.

Constructed for the WSA at the Permanente Metals Corporation, Emile Berliner was delivered to the United Fruits Company for use as a freighter.

== Naming ==
The Liberty ship was named after German-American inventor Emile Berliner, who was noted for contributions towards the gramophone.

== Construction ==
The ship's keel was laid down on 6 August 1943 and was launched on 28 August 1943. Emile Berliner possessed engines manufactured by Willamette Iron & Steel Corporation; construction was completed in Permanente Metal Corporation's Richmond #2 shipyard.

== Post-war service ==
On 17 June 1946, Emile Berliner entered the James River, Reserve Fleet. In 1947, she was privately sold to Helsingfors Steamship Co., Ltd., renamed Frostvik and re-launched with the Finnish flag. A number of sales followed:

- Rederibolaget Re-Be (1950) - as Arneta Finland
- FinlandBensow O/Y. A/B Wilh (1956) - as Arneta Finland
- Paulin A/B Chartering O/Y & Co. (1963) - as Susan Paulin Finland
- Astrorico Cia. Nav., S.A. (1965) - Kyra Liberia

Kyra was delivered to Bilbao, Spain for scrapping on 12 May 1969.
