= List of Liberty ships (B) =

This is a list of Liberty ships with names beginning with B.

== Description ==
The standard Liberty ship (EC-2-S-C1 type) was a cargo ship 441 feet 6 inches (134.57 m) long overall, with a beam of 56 feet 10 3/4 inches (17.34 m). It had a depth of 37 feet 4 inches (11.38 m) and a draft of 26 feet 10 inches (8.18 m). It was powered by a triple expansion steam engine, which had cylinders of 24 1/2 inches (62 cm), 37 inches (94 cm) and 70 inches (180 cm) diameter by 48 inches (120 cm) stroke. The engine produced 2,500ihp at 76rpm. Driving a four-blade propeller 18 feet 6 inches (5.64 m) in diameter, could propel the ship at 11 knots (20 km/h).

Cargo was carried in five holds, numbered 1–5 from bow to stern. Grain capacity was 84,183 cubic feet (2,383.8 m^{3}), 145,604 cubic feet (4,123.0 m^{3}), 96,429 cubic feet (2,730.6 m^{3}), 93,190 cubic feet (2,639 m^{3}) and 93,190 cubic feet (2,639 m^{3}), with a further 49,086 cubic feet (1,390.0 m^{3}) in the deep tanks. Bale capacity was 75,405 cubic feet (2,135.2 m^{3}), 134,638 cubic feet (3,812.5 m^{3}), 83,697 cubic feet (2,370.0 m^{3}), 82,263 cubic feet (2,329.4 m^{3}) and 82,435 cubic feet (2,334.3 m^{3}), with a further 41,135 cubic feet (1,164.8 m^{3}) in the deep tanks.

It carried a crew of 45, plus 36 United States Navy Armed Guard gunners. Later in the war, this was altered to a crew of 52, plus 29 gunners. Accommodation was in a three deck superstructure placed midships. The galley was equipped with a range, a 25 US gallons (95 L) stock kettle and other appliances. Messrooms were equipped with an electric hot plate and an electric toaster.

== Baku ==
Baku was built by Oregon Shipbuilding Corporation, Portland, Oregon. Her keel was laid on 24 June 1943. She was launched as David Douglas on 14 July and delivered as Baku on 22 July. To the Soviet Union under Lend-Lease. Scrapped at Vladivostok in November 1977.

== Banner Seam ==
Bannner Seam was a collier built by Delta Shipbuilding Company, New Orleans, Louisiana. Her keel was laid on 9 April 1945. She was launched on 12 June and delivered on 31 July. Built for the War Shipping Administration (WSA), she was operated under the management of International Freighting Corporation. Sold in 1946 to M. & J. Tracy Inc, New York and renamed Michael Tracy. She was scrapped at Kearny, New Jersey in July 1962.

== Barbara Frietchie ==
Barbara Frietchie was built by Bethlehem Fairfield Shipyard, Baltimore, Maryland. Her keel was laid on 21 October 1943. She was launched on 19 November and delivered on 29 November. Built for the WSA, she was operated under the management of Dichmann, Wright & Pugh Inc. Management transferred to A. H. Bull & Co. in 1946. She was laid up at Wilmington, North Carolina in 1949. Sold in 1951 to Liberty Navigation Co. Operated under the management of J. H. Winchester & Co. Owners renamed to Liberty Navigation & Trading Co. in 1955. Returned to United States Government in 1963. Scrapped at Hong Kong in 1964.

== Barney Kirschbaum ==
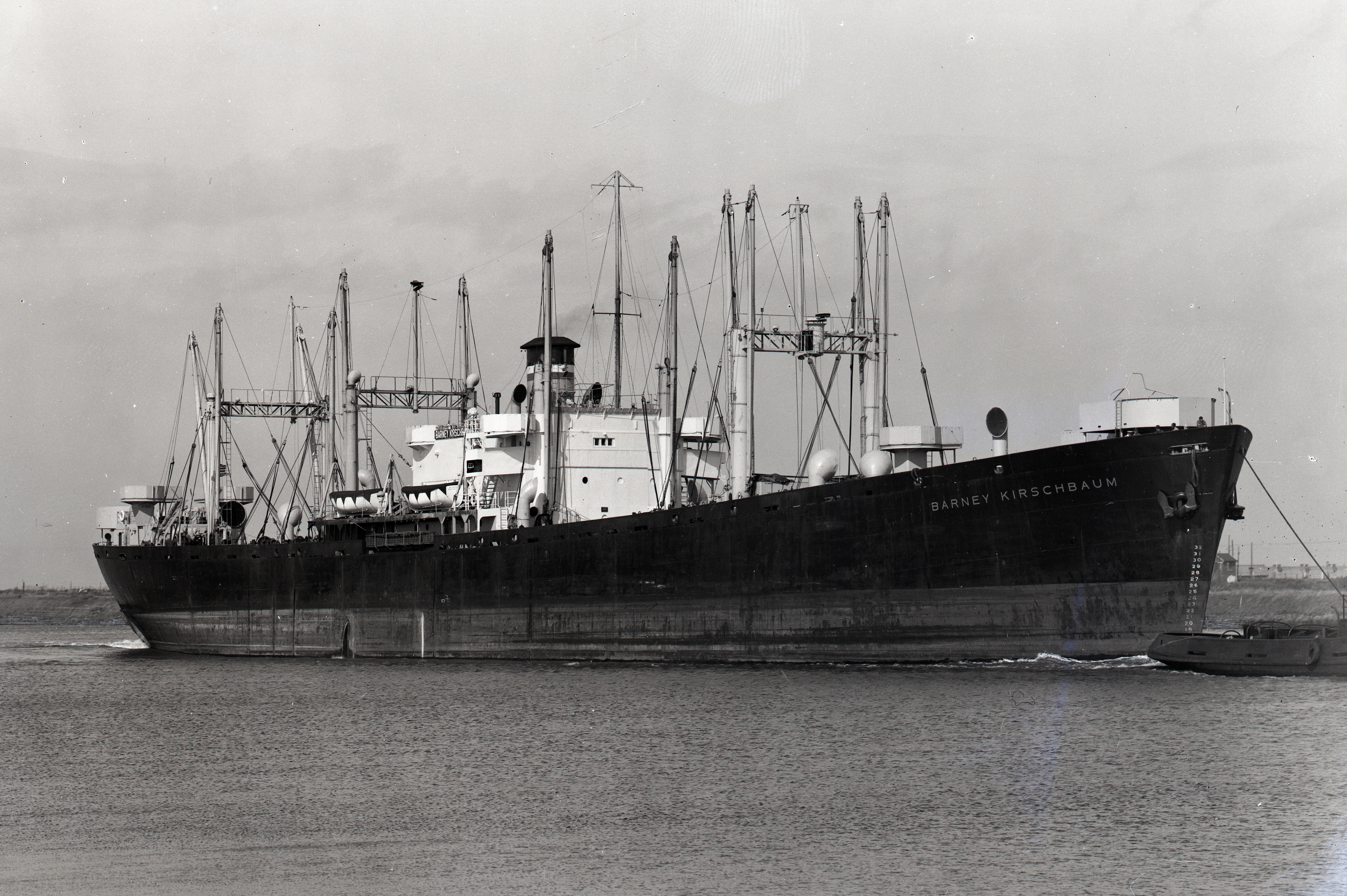
Barney Kirschbaum in Antwerp

Barney Kirschbaum was a boxed aircraft transport ship built by J. A. Jones Construction Company. Panama City, Florida. Her keel was laid on 15 February 1945. She was launched on 30 March and delivered on 13 April. Laid up at Mobile, Alabama post war, she was scrapped at Mobile in June 1975.

== Barrett Wendell ==
Barrett Wendell was built by New England Shipbuilding Corporation, South Portland, Maine. Her keel was laid on 15 September 1943. She was launched as Barrett Wendell on 5 November and delivered as Samphill on 15 November. To Ministry of War Transport (MoWT), operated under the management of Royal Mail Lines, London. Sold to her managers in 1947 and renamed Berbice. Sold in 1958 to Mareante Compania Navigation, Panama and renamed Nikolas S. Operated under the management of G. Lemos Bros. Sold in 1961 to Compania Navigation Aisinicolas. Re-registered to Lebanon, remaining under the same management. Scrapped at Kaohsiung, Taiwan in March 1967.

== Bartholomew Gosnold ==
Bartholomew Gosnold was built by New England Shipbuilding Corporation. Her keel was laid on 24 June 1943. She was launched on 22 August and delivered on 2 September. Built for the WSA, she was operated under the management of Marine Transport Lines. Sold in 1948 to A/S Sjofart, Norway and renamed Seabreeze. Operated under the management of T. S. Bendixen. Sold in 1959 to A/S D/S Fjeld, Norway and renamed Skjelenes. Operated under the management of Harald Meidell. Sold in 1961 to Lamda Shipping Enterprises Corp., Panama and renamed John G. L. Operated under the management of J. Livanos & Sons. Sold in 1964 to Cardinal Seafaring Lines and renamed Swift River. Re-registered to the United Kingdom, remaining under the same management. Sold in 1965 to Kallithea Shipping Co., Nicosia, Cyprus and renamed Kallithea. Scrapped at Sakai, Japan in October 1966.

== Basilan ==
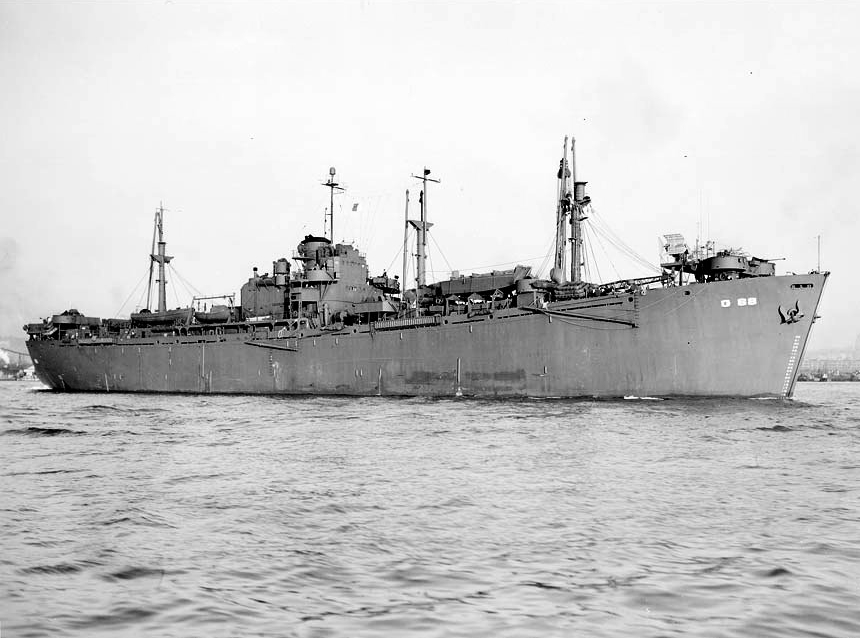
USS Basilan

Basilan was built by Delta Shipbuilding Company. Her keel was laid on 5 February 1944. She was launched as Jacques Philippe Villere on 21 March. Completed at the Waterman Steamship Corporation's yard at Mobile as Basilan for the United States Navy. Delivered on 21 April. A repair and supply ship, she was laid up in Suisun Bay in 1947. She was sold to a shipbreaker in Portland, Oregon in June 1972.

== B. Charney Vladeck ==
B. Charney Vladeck was built by New England Shipbuilding Corporation. Her keel was laid on 17 May 1944. She was launched on 7 July and delivered on 17 July. Built for the WSA, she was operated under the management of Merchants & Mariners Transportation Co. Sold in 1947 to Compania Naviation Sud-Americana, Panama and renamed Saraya. Sold in 1949 to Rio Grande Compania Navigation, Panama and renamed Rio Grande. Operated under the management of Rethymnis & Kulukundis. Sold in 1956 to San Gabriel Compania Maritime, Panama and renamed Archon Raphael. Operated under the management of Faros Shipping Co. Management transferred to Diamantis Lemos Ltd in 1961. Ran aground off Musha Island, Djibouti (11°44′N 43°11′E) on 23 May 1967 whilst on a voyage from Sunderland, United Kingdom to Shanghai, China. Refloated on 17 June and towed in to Djibouti. She broke from her moorings on 27 February 1968 and sank 3 nautical miles (5.6 km) off the Musha Island Lighthouse. She had broken in two by January 1969.

== Beckley Seam ==
Beckley Seam was a collier built by Delta Shipbuilding Company. Her keel was laid on 9 April 1945. She was launched on 12 July and delivered on 31 August. Built for the WSA, she was operated under the management of Eastern Gas & Fuel Associates, Boston, Massachusetts. Sold to her managers in 1947 and renamed Malden. Ownership transferred to Massachusetts Trustees of Eastern Gas & Fuel Associates, Boston. Converted to a non-propelled barge at New Orleans in 1963 and renamed Eastern 3. Used as a dock in Sept Iles, Quebec. As of 2013/2014 the hull has been beached and is visible on Google Earth.

== Belgian Amity ==
Belgian Amity was built by New England Shipbuilding Corporation. Her keel was laid on 29 January 1945. She was launched as Lawrence T. Sullivan on 28 March and delivered as Belgian Amity on 7 April. To the Belgian Government in 1946, operated under the management of Compagnie Maritime Belge, Antwerp. Renamed Capitaine Limbor in 1947 and placed under the management of Agence Maritime International. Sold in 1962 to Society Navigation Pan Europea, Panama and renamed Capitaine. Operated under the management of Società per Azione Industria Armamento. Sold later that year to Nevada Shipping Co., Panama and renamed Nevada. Operated under the management of Keller Shipping Ltd. Scrapped at Gandia, Spain in May 1971.

== Belgian Dynasty ==
Belgian Dynasty was built by New England Shipbuilding Corporation. Her keel was laid on 24 May 1943. She was launched as Harry A. Garfield on 23 July 1943. Completed as Belgian Dynasty, she was delivered on 31 July. To the Belgian Government under Lend-Lease. Sold in 1947 to Compagnie Maritime Belge and renamed Capitaine Frankignoul. Operated under the management of Agence Maritime International. Sold in 1959 to Ausonia di Navigazione di Fratelli Ravano di Alberto, Genoa, Italy and renamed Honestas. Sold in 1964 to Feliz Compania Navigation, Panama and renamed Master Elias. Ran aground on Burias Island, Philippines (12°49′N 123°17′E) on 11 March 1963 whilst on a voyage from a Japanese port to Manila, Philippines. She was refloated on 15 March and towed in to Manila in a damaged condition. She was scrapped at Hirao, Japan in August 1965.

== Belgian Equality ==
Belgian Equality was built by J. A. Jones Construction Company, Brunswick, Georgia. Her keel was laid on 9 January 1945. She was launched as Richard A. Van Pelt on 17 February. Completed as Belgian Equality, she was delivered on 28 February. To the Belgian Government under Lend-Lease. Sold in 1947 to Compagnie Maritime Belge and renamed Capitaine Heusers. Operated under the management of Agence Maritime International, Antwerp. Sold in 1950 to Compagnie Maritime Congolaise. Sold in 1960 to Compagnie Africaine di Navigation, Antwerp. Sold in 1962 to Twenty-sixth October Marine Co. and renamed St. Demetrius. Re-registered to Lebanon and operated under the management of Nomikos Ltd. Sold in 1967 to St. Demetrius Maritime Co., Gibraltar and re-registered to the United Kingdom. Sold in 1969 to Anastasios em Karavias. Re-registered to Greece and operated under the management of Karavias Ltd. Scrapped at Hong Kong in September 1969.

== Belgian Liberty ==
Belgian Liberty

Belgian Liberty was built by Todd Houston Shipbuilding Corporation, Houston, Texas. Her keel was laid on 31 May 1943. She was launched as George P. Garrison on 12 July and completed as Belgian Liberty on 27 July. To the Belgian Government under Lend-Lease. Returned to the United States Government in 1947. Renamed George P. Garrison and laid up in the Hudson River. To the United States Department of Commerce (USDoC) in 1951. Operated under the management of Prudential Steamship Corporation. Laid up in the Hudson River in 1952. Scuttled off the Virginia Capes in 1975.

== Belgian Loyalty ==
Belgian Loyalty

Belgian Loyalty was built by Permanente Metals Corporation, Richmond, California. Her keel was laid on 21 June 1942. She was launched as Richard Stockton on 17 August. Completed as Belgian Loyalty, she was delivered on 31 August. To Belgian Government under Lend-Lease. To United States Maritime Commission (USMC) in 1947. Renamed Richard Stockton and laid up in the Hudson River. To USDoC in 1951, operated under the management of American Foreign Steamship Corporation. Laid up in the James River in 1952. Scrapped at Castellón de la Plana, Spain in June 1972.

== Belgian Tenacity ==
Belgian Tenacity

Belgian Tenacity was built by New England Shipbuilding Corporation. Her keel was laid on 10 February 1944. She was launched on 28 March and delivered on 18 April. To Belgian Government under Lend-Lease. Sold in 1947 to Compagnie Maritime Belge and renamed Captiaine Costermans. Sold in 1960 to Società per Azioni di Navigazione Aliseo, Genoa and renamed Sudaliseo. Scrapped at Vado Ligure, Italy in June 1968.

== Belgian Unity ==
Belgian Unity was built by New England Shipbuilding Corporation. Her keel was laid on 18 September 1944. She was launched as Bert Williams on 30 October. Completed as Belgian Unity, she was delivered on 9 November. To Belgian Government under Lend-Lease. To USMC in 1946 and renamed Earl A. Bloomquist. Operated under the management of Dolphin Steamship Co. Laid up in the Hudson River in 1949. Reactivated later that year under the management of American-Hawaiian Steamship Company. To USDoC in 1951, under the same management. Laid up in the James River in 1952. Sold to shipbreakers in Karachi, Pakistan in December 1970. Resold, and scrapped at Valencia, Spain in October 1971.

== Belle Isle ==
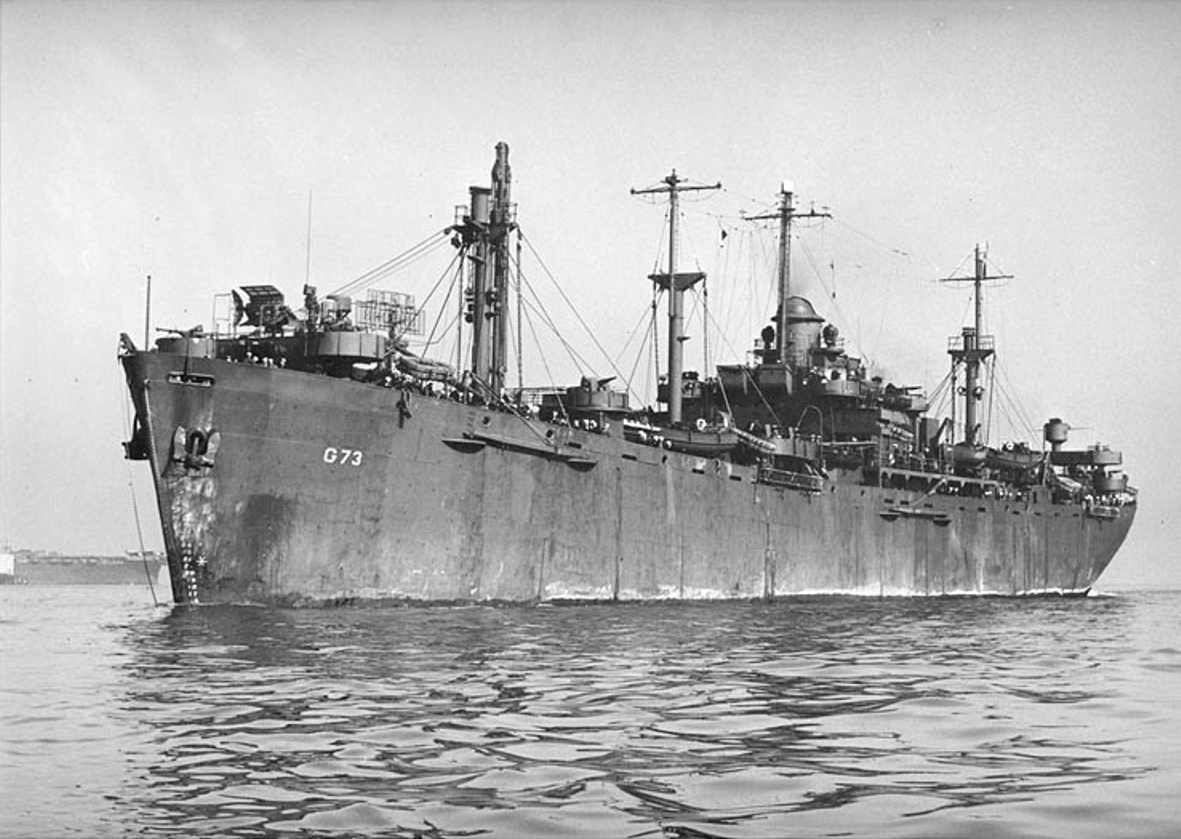
USS Belle Isle

Belle Isle was built by New England Shipbuilding Corporation. Her keel was laid on 19 September 1944. She was launched on 3 November. Completed by Bethlehem Steel Co., Hoboken, New Jersey, she was delivered on 15 November. Built as a repair and supply ship, she was placed in reserve at San Diego, California in August 1946. Reclassified as a general stores issue ship in August 1951, she was struck from the navy list in April 1960. Presumed scrapped in the United States.

== Belva Lockwood ==
Belva Lockwood was built by Oregon Shipbuilding Corporation. Her keel was laid on 16 February 1943. She was launched on 9 March and delivered on 16 March. She was scrapped at Baltimore in February 1962.

== Ben A. Ruffin ==
Ben A. Ruffin was built by Southeastern Shipbuilding Corporation, Savannah, Georgia. Her keel was laid on 12 February 1944. She was launched on 11 April and delivered on 24 April. Built for the WSA, she was operated under the management of the United States War Department and loaned to the Chinese Government. Renamed Hai Hsuan in 1946, operated under the management of China Merchants Steam Navigation Company. In 1950, her crew mutinied in support of the Chinese Communist Government whilst the ship was in port at Singapore. She was laid up there. Awarded to the United States Government in 1957, she was sold in 1958 to General Marine Navigation Co. A caretaker crew remained on board during her lay-up. She was towed to Hong Kong to be refitted. Renamed Julia and re-registered to Liberia. Operated under the management of United Carriers Corp. Sold in 1960 to Compania de Navigation Maritima, Rio de Janeiro, Brazil and renamed Bruce Thomas. Renamed Caicara in 1963. Scrapped at Rio de Janeiro in January 1972.

== Ben B. Lindsey ==
Ben B. Lindsey was built by California Shipbuilding Corporation, Terminal Island, Los Angeles, California. Her keel was laid on 11 November 1943. She was launched on 8 December and delivered on 27 December. Built for the WSA, she was operated under the management of Interocean Steamship Corp. Sold in 1947 to Dani & Co., Genoa and renamed Giambattista. Sold in 1964 to Cheyenne Compania Navigation, Panama and renamed Dr. Antonis Lemos. Re-registered to Liberia and operated under the management of Panagiotis A. Lemon. Renamed Oinoussian Sea in 1966. Sold in 1967 to Oinoussai Shipping Co., Cyprus and renamed Egnousa, remaining under the same management. Scrapped at Shanghai in June 1968.

== Ben F. Dixon ==
Ben F. Dixon was built by Bethlehem Fairfield Shipyard. Her keel was laid on 25 August 1943. She was launched on 21 September and delivered on 29 September. Built for the WSA, she was operated under the management of the United Fruit Company. Sold in 1947 to A. H. Bull Steamship Inc., New York and renamed Angelina. Damaged by fire in the Chesapeake and Delaware Canal on 15 May 1952 when the steamship Barbara Lykes collided with the tanker F. L. Hayes. Petrol spilled from the tanker and caught fire. Returned to USDoC in 1961. Scrapped at Bordentown, New Jersey in 1963.

== Ben H. Miller ==
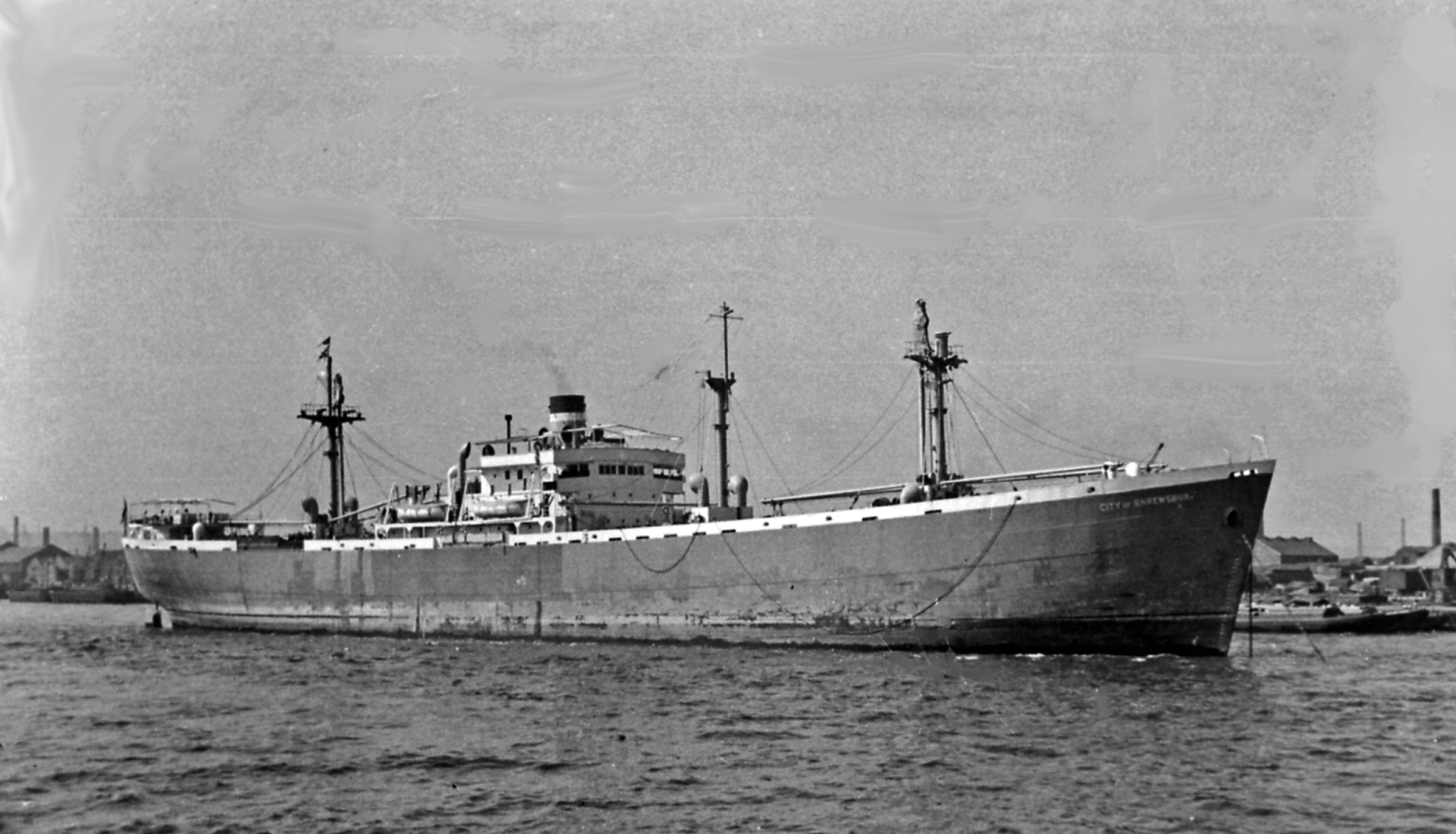
City of Shrewsbury

Ben H. Miller was built by Bethlehem Fairfield Shipyard. Her keel was laid on 20 November 1943. She was launched on 10 December and delivered on 20 December. To MoWT, operated under the management of Ellerman & Pappayanni Line. Sold in 1947 to Ellerman & Bucknall Steamship Co., London and renamed City of Shrewsbury. Sold in 1959 to Compania de Navigation Arcoul, Pahama and renamed Marucla. Operated under the management of Marcou & Sons. Chartered to a Soviet firm in 1962. Intercepted by the USS John R. Pierce and USS Joseph P. Kennedy Jr. 180 nautical miles (330 km) north east of Nassau, Bahamas on 26 October 1962 during the Cuban Missile Crisis. She was allowed to proceed on her voyage from Riga, Soviet Union to Havana, Cuba. Management transferred to Vintifreighters in 1965. Scrapped at Hong Kong in May 1969.

== Ben Holladay ==
Ben Holladay was built by Oregon Shipbuilding Corporation. Her keel was laid on 14 May 1943. She was launched on 3 June and delivered on 11 June. She was scrapped at Oakland, California in October 1958.

== Benito Juarez ==
Benito Juarez was built by Todd Houston Shipbuilding Corporation. Her keel was laid on 1 March 1943. She was launched on 14 April and delivered on 30 April. Built for the WSA, she was operated under the management of the United Fruit Company. Sold in 1947 to Scindia Steam Navigation Co., Bombay, India and renamed Jalakirti. Sold in 1956 to Compania de Navigation Centrale, Panama and renamed Chrysanthi. Re-registered to Liberia and operated under the management of Falafios Ltd. Sold in 1964 to Compania di Navigation Centro and re-registered to the Lebanon, remaining under the same management. Ran aground on the Loculan Shoals, off the shore of Clarin, Misamis Occidental, Philippines and was damaged on 17 August 1966 whilst on a voyage from the Philippines to a European port. Later refloated and resumed her voyage. Ran aground at Singapore on 11 September. Refloated on 17 October and laid up at Singapore. Scrapped at Hong Kong in August 1968.

== Benjamin A. Fisher ==
Benjamin A. Fisher was built by Delta Shipbuilding Company. Her keel was laid on 7 November 1944. She was launched on 11 December and delivered on 28 December. She was scrapped at Portland, Oregon in January 1966.

== Benjamin Bonnneville ==
Benjamin Bonneville was built by Permanente Metals Corporation. Her keel was laid on 31 December 1942. She was launched on 30 January 1943 and delivered on 12 February. Built for the WSA, she was operated under the management of Coastwise Line. Sold in 1947 to Okeanoporos Shipping Co., Athens and renamed Nicholaos Pateras. Operated under the management of N. J. Pateras. Renamed Evangelismos in 1953. Management transferred to Harry Hadjipateros Bros. in 1955. Sold in 1966 to Adelfotis Shipping Corp., Greece and renamed Manna Despoina, remaining under the same management. Scrapped at Shanghai in 1968.

== Benjamin Bourn ==
Benjamin Bourn was built by Todd Houston Shipbuilding Corporation. Her keel was laid on 3 April 1942. She was launched on 3 July and delivered on 4 August. Sold for scrapping at New Orleans in November 1969.

== Benjamin Brown French ==
Benjamin Brown French was built by Southeastern Shipbuilding Corporation. Her keel was laid on 13 May 1944. She was launched on 29 June and delivered on 20 July. She was scrapped at Philadelphia, Pennsylvania in April 1967.

== Benjamin Carpenter ==
Benjamin Carpenter was built by Permanente Metals Corporation. Her keel was laid on 25 March 1944. She was launched on 14 April and delivered on 22 April. She was scrapped at Barrow-in-Furness, United Kingdom in November 1960.

== Benjamin Chew ==
Benjamin Chew was built by Bethlehem Fairfield Shipyard. Her keel was laid on 15 June 1942. She was launched on 10 August and delivered on 22 August. Converted to type EC2-S-8a ship at Brooklyn, New York In 1956. Two steam turbines, as used in Victory ships, were fitted. Fuel consumption found to be excessive. Subsequently, laid up in reserve at Mobile. Scrapped at Panama City, Florida in August 1973.

== Benjamin Contee ==
Benjamin Contee was built by Delts Shipbuilding Company. Her keel was laid on 2 February 1942. She was launched on 15 June and delivered on 7 August. She was torpedoed and damaged in the Mediterranean Sea 16 nautical miles (30 km) off Cape de Gardia, Tunisia by Axis aircraft on 16 August 1943 whilst on a voyage from Bona, Tunisia to Oran, Algeria. Subsequently towed in to Gibraltar. Sunk as a blockship as part of a Mulberry Harbour off the coast of Normandy, France on 16 June 1944. Foundered during storms between 19 and 22 June.

== Benjamin D. Wilson ==
Benjamin D. Wilson was built by California Shipbuilding Corporation. Her keel was laid on 7 April 1943. She was launched on 30 April and delivered on 13 May. She was scrapped at Baltimore in February 1962.

== Benjamin F. Coston ==
Benjamin F. Coston was built by J. A. Jones Construction Company, Panama City. Her keel was laid on 31 July 1944. She was launched on 6 September and delivered on 23 September. She was scrapped at New York in October 1964.

== Benjamin Franklin ==
Benjamin Franklin was built by California Shipbuilding Corporation. Her keel was laid on 21 June 1941. She was launched on 16 November and delivered on 21 March 1942. She was scrapped at Tacoma, Washington in 1958.

== Benjamin Goodhue ==
Benjamin Goodhue was built by California Shipbuilding Corporation. Her keel was laid on 20 October 1941. She was launched on 31 March 1942 and delivered on 20 May. She was scrapped at Staten Island, New York in October 1961.

== Benjamin Harrison ==
Benjamin Harrison was built by Bethlehem Fairfield Shipyard. Her keel was laid on 27 September 1941. She was launched on 24 January 1942 and delivered on 13 March. Built for the WSA, she was operated under the management of Calmar Steamship Company. Torpedoed and damaged in the Atlantic Ocean 150 nautical miles (280 km) off the Azores (39°02′N 24°15′W) on 16 March 1943 whilst on a voyage from New York to Gibraltar. Abandoned by her crew, she was shelled by USS Rowan and left in a sinking condition.

== Benjamin Hawkins ==
Benjamin Hawkins was built by Bethlehem Fairfield Shipyard. Her keel was laid on 30 July 1942. She was launched on 7 September and delivered on 20 September. She was laid up in the James River post-war. Sold to Dutch shipbreakers in December 1972. Resold to Spanish breakers and rename Roem 1. Taken in tow with Roem 2 by tug Seetrans for voyage to Bilbao, Spain. Both vessels broke their tow 200 nautical miles (370 km) off Norfolk, Virginia on 3 February 1973. They were subsequently taken in tow by United States Coast Guard vessels and then the tow was re-established. Arrived at Bilbao for scrapping on 2 April.

== Benjamin H. Brewster ==
Benjamin H. Brewster was built by Permanente Metals Corporation. Her keel was laid on 19 August 1943. She was launched on 9 September and delivered on 17 September. Built for the WSA, she was operated under the management of Union Sulphur Company. Sold in 1947 to Achille Lauro, Naples, Italy and renamed Angelina Lauro. Renamed Lily Lauro in 1964. Scrapped at La Spezia, Italy in May 1969.

== Benjamin H. Bristow ==
Benjamin H. Bristow was built by Permanente Metals Corporation. Her keel was laid on 7 December 1942. She was launched on 4 January 1943 and delivered on 15 January. Built for the WSA, she was operated under the management of American West Africa Line. She was scrapped at Mobile in September 1969.

== Benjamin H. Grierson ==
Benjamin H. Grierson was built by Oregon Shipbuilding Corporation. Her keel was laid on 24 February 1943. She was launched on 17 March and delivered on 25 March. Laid up at Mobile post-war, she was scuttled off Panama City, Florida on 29 September 1977.

== Benjamin H. Hill ==
Benjamin H. Hill was built by J. A. Jones Construction Company, Brunswick. Her keel was laid on 16 December 1943. She was launched on 7 February 1944 and delivered on 19 February. built for the WSA, she was operated under the management of A. L. Burbank & Co. Laid up in the James River post-war, she was scrapped at Bilbao in October 1971.

== Benjamin H. Latrobe ==
Benjamin H. Latrobe was built by Alabama Drydock and Shipbuilding Company, Mobile. She was delivered on 15 December 1942. Built for the WSA, she was operated under the management of American Export Lines. To the French Government in 1947 and renamed Vercours. Operated under the management of Compagnie des Messageries Maritimes. Management transferred to Sociėtė Fraimer in 1961. Sold in 1964 to Manolis Compania Navigation, Panama and renamed Manolis. Re-registered to Liberia and operated under the management of Dynamic Shipping Inc. Scrapped at Kaohsiung in 1968.

== Benjamin Holt ==
Benjamin Holt was built by Permanente Metals Corporation. Her keel was laid on 2 April 1943. She was launched on 30 April and delivered on 11 May. She was scrapped at Oakland in 1958.

== Benjamin Huntington ==
Benjamin Huntington was built by Todd Houston Shipbuilding Corporation. Her keel was laid on 4 July 1942. She was launched on 11 September and delivered on 30 September. Laid up in the Hudson River post-war, she was scrapped at Santander, Spain in April 1971.

== Benjamin Ide Wheeler ==
Benjamin Ide Wheeler was built by California Shipbuilding Corporation. Her keel was laid on 28 October 1942. She was launched on 27 November and delivered on 17 December. Sunk by a kamikaze attack off Leyte, Philippines on 27 October 1944. Subsequently refloated and used as a depot ship. After sustaining further battle and storm damage in the Leyte Gulf, she was laid up in Suisun Bay. She was scrapped in the United States in 1948.

== Benjamin Lundy ==
Benjamin Lundy was built by California Shipbuilding Corporation. Her keel was laid on 24 January 1943. She was launched on 20 February and delivered on 9 March. She was scrapped at Philadelphia in 1962.

== Benjamin N. Cardozo ==
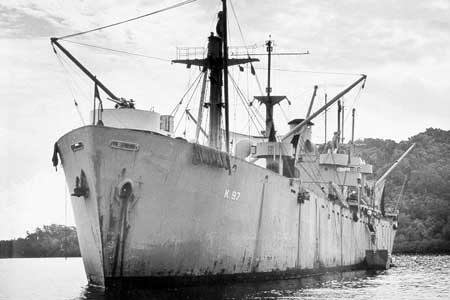
USS Serpens

Benjamin N. Cardozo was built by California Shipbuilding Corporation. Her keel was laid on 10 March 1943. She was launched on 5 April and delivered to the United States Navy as Serpens on 19 April. Converted to an ammunition stowage ship at Wellington, New Zealand in late 1944. On 29 January 1945, she exploded off Guadalcanal, Solomon Islands whilst depth charges were being loaded and was obliterated.

== Benjamin Peixotto ==
Benjamin Peixotto was built by Bethlehem Fairfield Shipyard. Her keel was laid on 31 July 1944. She was launched on 4 September and delivered on 29 September. Reported to be a constructive total loss in 1946, she was sold to China for scrap in 1948. Ran aground in Tola Harbour, Hong Kong in a typhoon on 7 September 1949. She was refloated on 20 October 1950 and scrapped at Hong Kong in November.

== Benjamin R. Curtis ==
Benjamin R. Curtis was built by California Shipbuilding Corporation. Her keel was laid on 30 September 1942. She was launched on 3 November and delivered on 21 November. Built for the WSA, she was operated under the management of United States Lines. To the French Government in 1947. Renamed Grandcamp and operated under the management of Compagnie Générale Transatlantique. Caught fire, exploded and was obliterated at Texas City, Texas on 16 April 1947.

== Benjamin R. Milam ==
Benjamin R. Milam was built by Todd Houston Shipbuilding Corporation. Her keel was laid on 24 April 1943. She was launched on 3 June and delivered on 21 June. Built for the WSA, she was operated under the management of American South African Line. On 8 March 1945, she suffered an explosion in her boiler room and sank off Locust Point, Baltimore. She was refloated and repaired. To French Government in 1947 and renamed Hyères. Operated under the management of Sociėtė Gėnėrale de Transport Maritimes à Vapeur. Sold in 1961 to West African Carriers Corp., Lugano, Switzerland and renamed Duero. Re-registered to Liberia. On 24 April 1961, one of her crew sustained a back injury on board when the ship was off the Isles of Scilly, United Kingdom. He was evacuated by a Royal Navy helicopter and taken to hospital in Penzance. Sold in 1964 to Consorcio Navigation, Montevideo, Uruguay and renamed Fanor. Operated under the management of Connavi. Laid up at Montevideo in 1967, she was scrapped at Santander in October 1968.

== Benjamin Rush ==
Benjamin Rush was built by Bethlehem Fairfield Shipyard. Her keel was laid on 13 December 1941. She was launched on 25 June 1942 and delivered on 11 July. She was scrapped at Baltimore in 1954.

== Benjamin Schlesinger ==
Benjamin Schlesinger was built by Bethlehem Fairfield Shipyard. Her keel was laid on 23 December 1943. She was launched on 24 January 1944 and delivered on 7 February. Built for the WSA, she was operated under the management of Moore-McCormack Lines. Sold in 1946 to Ponchelet Marine Corporation, New York. Renamed Jeanette L. Routh in 1947. Sold in 1948 to Sprague Steamship Co., Boston and renamed Black Point. Sold in 1955 to Marine Navigation Co., Boston and renamed Marine Pioneer. Placed under the management of Marine Transport Lines in 1962. Sold in 1963 to American Transport Co., New York. Operated under the management of Transamerican Steamship Corp. Scrapped at Veracruz in July 1963.

== Benjamin Silliman ==
Benjamin Silliman was built by Delta Shipbuilding Company. Her keel was laid on 14 August 1944. She was launched on 25 September and delivered on 27 October. Laid up in the James River post-war, she was scrapped at Bilbao in June 1971.

== Benjamin Smith ==
Benjamin Smith was built by North Carolina Shipbuilding Company. Her keel was laid on 11 September 1942. She was launched on 28 October and delivered on 7 November. Built for the WSA, she was operated under the management of South Atlantic Steamship Co. Torpedoed and sunk in the Atlantic Ocean off Sassandra, French West Africa (4°05′N 7°50′W) by U-175 on 23 January 1943 whilst on a voyage from Charleston, South Carolina to Accra, Gold Coast.

== Benjamin Warner ==
Benjamin Warner was built by Permanente Metals Corporation. Her keel was laid on 13 June 1944. SHe was launched on 1 July and delivered on 14 July. Laid up in the Hudson River post-war, she was sold to shipbreakers in Karachi in December 1970. Resold, she was scrapped at Bilbao in October 1971.

== Benjamin Waterhouse ==
Benjamin Waterhouse was built by Permanente Metals Corporation. Her keel was laid on 29 February 1944. She was launched on 23 March and delivered on 30 March. She was the last Liberty Ship built on the West Coast of the United States. Laid up at Mobile post-war, she was scuttled off Horn Island, Mississippi on 10 June 1975.

== Benjamin Williams ==
Benjamin Williams was built by North Carolina Shipbuilding Company. Her keel was laid on 19 July 1942. She was launched on 23 September and delivered on 4 October. She was scrapped at Philadelphia in December 1966.

== Ben Robertson ==
Ben Robertson was built by Southeastern Shipbuilding Corporation. Her keel was laid on 18 November 1943. She was launched on 4 January 1944 and delivered on 21 January. Built for the WSA, she was operated under the management of A. H. Bull Co. Inc. Sold in 1946 to Constantine G. Gratsos, Athens, Greece. Renamed Kastor in 1947 and placed under the management of Dracoulis Ltd. Management changed to George D. Gratsos in 1949. Sold to Gratsos Bros., Athens in 1963. Scrapped at Hirao in December 1968.

== Ben T. Osbourne ==
Ben T. Osbourne was built by Oregon Shipbuilding Corporation. Her keel was laid on 22 August 1943. She was launched on 8 September and delivered on 14 September. She was scrapped at Portland, Oregon in June 1966.

== Bernard Carter ==
Bernard Carter was built by Bethlehem Fairfield Shipyard. Her keel was laid on 6 June 1942. She was launched on 29 June and delivered on 8 August. She was scrapped at Baltimore in 1960.

== Bernard L. Rodman ==
Bernard L. Rodman was built by Todd Houston Shipbuilding Corporation. Her keel was laid on 30 December 1944. She was launched on 2 February 1945 and delivered on 13 February. built for the WSA, she was operated under the management of Overlakes Freight Corp. Management transferred to Grace Lines Inc. in 1946 then American President Lines in 1948. Sold in 1951 to Transpacific Navigation Corp, New York and renamed Seafighter. Placed under the management of Orion Shipping and Trading Co. in 1952. Sold in 1953 to Incaica Compania Armamente, Panama and renamed Melida. Operated under the management of N. J. Goulandris. Sold in 1959 to Rosario Steamship Co., Panama. Re-registered to Liberia and operated under the management of Suwanee Steamship Co. Sold in 1967 to Jupiter Maritime Corp. and renamed Jupiter. Remaining under the Liberian flag but operated under the management of Motorships Inc. Ran aground off Cabo San Lázaro, Mexico (24°48′N 112°19′W) on 29 March 1968 whilst on a voyage from Osaka, Japan to Mazatlán, Mexico and was abandoned.

== Bernard N. Baker ==
Bernard N. Baker was built by Bethlehem Fairfield Shipyard. Her keel was laid on 4 March 1943. She was launched on 4 April and delivered on 13 April. She was scrapped at Wilmington, Delaware in August 1964.

== Bernardo O'Higgins ==
Bernardo O'Higgins was built by Permanente Metals Corporation. Her keel was laid on 26 September 1943. She was launched on 14 October and delivered on 23 October. She was scrapped at Oakland in December 1959.

== Bert McDowell ==
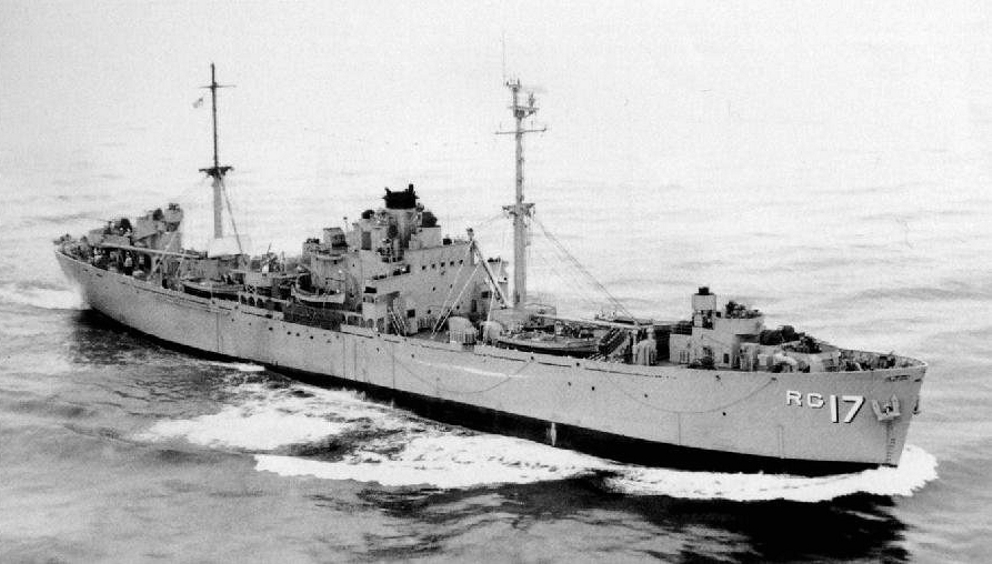
USS Hooper Island

Bert McDowell was built by Bethlehem Fairfield Shipyard. Her keel was laid on 16 September 1944. She was launched on 18 October and delivered to the United States Navy as Hoopers Island on 30 October. An engine repair ship, she was laid up at Alameda, California in January 1948. Recommissioned in December 1952. Laid up at San Diego, California in July 1959. Moved to Suisun Bay in 1960. Scrapped at Portland, Oregon in November 1970.

== Bertram G. Goodhue ==
Bertram G. Goodhue was built by Todd Houston Shipbuilding Corporation. Her keel was laid on 29 April 1944. She was launched on 4 June and delivered on 15 June. She was scrapped at Richmond in 1967.

== Bert Williams (I) ==
See the entry for Belgian Unity.

== Bert Williams (II) ==
Bert Williams was built by New England Shipbuilding Corporation. Her keel was laid on 9 October 1944. She was launched on 18 November and delivered on 30 November. Built for the WSA, she was operated under the management of Blidberg Rothchild Company. Driven ashore in the Gulf of Suez 8 nautical miles (15 km) from the Al-Ashrafi Lighthouse on 18 April 1948 whilst on a voyage from Fremantle, Australia to Suez, Egypt. She was refloated and towed in to Suez, then sold. In July 1948, she broke in two whilst being towed to Venice, Italy and came ashore near Mersa Matruh, Egypt. Declared a constructive total loss. The bow section was salvaged in 1951 and joined to the stern section of Nathaniel Bacon at Genoa to form a new ship, named Boccadasse.

== Betsy Ross ==
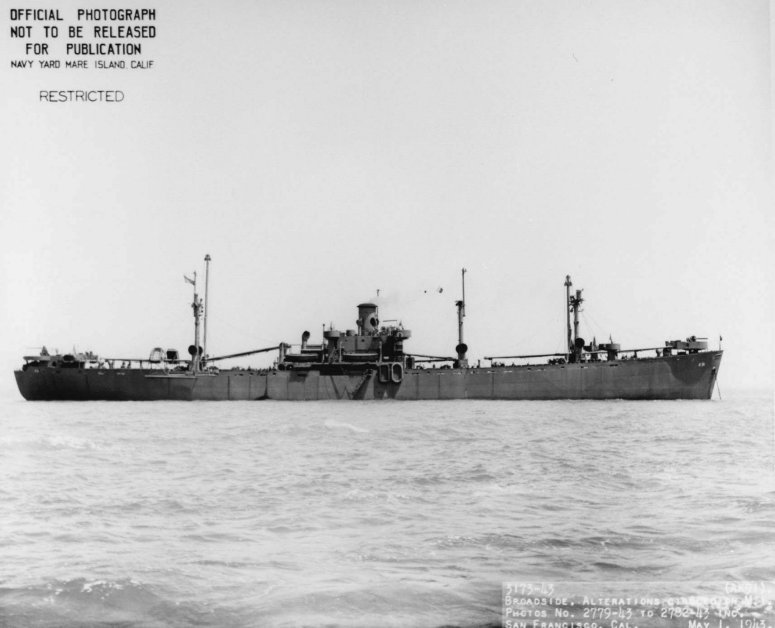
USS Cor Coroli

Betsy Ross was built by Permanente Metals Corporation. Her keel was laid on 20 February 1943. She was launched on 19 March and delivered on 31 March. To the United States Navy as Cor Coroli. Returned to WSA in December 1945. Renamed Betsy Ross and laid up in the James River. Scuttled off the coast of Florida in 1978.

== Betty Zane ==
Betty Zane was built by North Carolina Shipbuilding Company. Her keel was laid on 20 November 1942. She was launched on 22 December and delivered on 31 December. A troop carrier, she was built for the WSA and operated under the management of States Marine Corp. Sold in 1947 to D. A. Pateras, Chios, Greece and renamed Anastassios Pateras. Operated under the management of Lemos & Pateras. Sold in 1963 to Maribenes Compania Navigation, Panama and renamed Anastassis, remaining under the Greek flag. Operated under the management of Venizelos. Sold in 1965 to Resureccion Compania Navigation, Panama. Remained under the same flag and managers. Re-registered to Panama in 1967, sold later that year to Anastassis Compania de Vapores, Panama, remaining under the same management. Scrapped at Moji, Japan in February 1968.

== B. F. Irvine ==
B. F. Irvine was built by Oregon Shipbuilding Corporation. Her keel was laid on 31 July 1943. She was launched on 19 August and delivered on 26 August. She was converted to a crane barge at Portland, Oregon in 1965.

== B. F. Shaw ==
B. F. Shaw was built by Oregon Shipbuilding Corporation. Her keel was laid on 21 March 1943. She was launched on 9 April and delivered on 17 April. Laid up at Beaumont, Texas post-war, she was scuttled off Freeport, Texas in June 1976.

== Big Foot Wallace ==
Big Foot Wallace was built by Todd Houston Shipbuilding Corporation. Her keel was laid on 12 October 1942. She was launched as Fitzhugh Lee on 12 December and delivered as Big Foot Wallace on 30 December. Laid up in 1945, but returned to service in 1946 before being laid up again. Served during the Korean War, then laid up at Mobile. Scrapped at Panama City, Florida in August 1965.

== Billy Mitchell ==
Billy Mitchell was built by California Shipbuilding Corporation. Her keel was laid on 11 May 1943. She was launched on 2 June and delivered on 17 June. She was scrapped at Kearny in 1965.

== Billy Sunday ==
Billy Sunday was built by California Shipbuilding Corporation. Her keel was laid on 14 June 1943. She was launched on 10 July and delivered on 22 July. Built for the WSA, she was operated under the management of Luckenbach Steamship Co. Sold in 1947 to Society Maritime San Nicolas, Panama and renamed Euryviades. Operated under the management of Atlas Trading Corp. Re-registered to Honduras in 1951 and placed under the management of Petmar Agencies. Re-registered to Liberia in 1952. Sold in 1961 to Marchessini Lines Corp., and placed under the management of P. D. Marchessini. Sold later that year to Protoklidos Compania Navigation, Panama and renamed Protoklidos. Re-registered to Lebanon and operated under the management of N. J. Pateras. Ran aground on the Estelas Rocks, off the coast of Portugal (39°30′N 9°35′W) on 18 March 1963 whilst on a voyage from Bremerhaven, West Germany to Hong Kong and was abandoned. She floated off the next day and was taken in tow, but sank on 20 March 4 nautical miles (7.4 km) north of Cabo da Roca, Portugal.

== Binger Hermann ==
Binger Hermann was built by Oregon Shipbuilding Corporation. Her keel was laid on 10 June 1943. She was launched on 30 June and delivered on 8 July. She was scrapped at Kearny in February 1971.

== Bjarne A. Lia ==
Bjarne A. Lia was built by J. A. Jones Construction Company, Panama City, Florida. Her keel was laid on 31 October 1944. She was launched on 30 November and delivered on 14 December. Built for the WSA, she was operated under the management of Moore-McCormack Lines. Sold in 1949 to Drytrans Inc., New York and renamed Frederic C. Collin. Sold in 1957 to Bulkcargo Shipping Corp. Renamed Penn Trader, re-registered to Liberia and operated under the management of Penn Shipping Co. Took part in the search from the West German barque Pamir, which foundered in September 1957 in the Atlantic Ocean. Reported seeing flares, presumed to have come from the liferafts. Sold in 1958 to Penntrans Co. and re-registered to the United States. Sold in 1964 to Pan American Tankers Corp. and renamed Hanover. Operated under the management of George T. Bates & Co. Sold in 1966 to Santa Sofia Compania Armadora, Panama and renamed Santa Sofia. Re-registered to Liberia. Sold later that year to Ocean Transport Co. and renamed Sigalpha. Operated under the management of Neris Carbon & Oil Corp. Sold in 1967 to Coast Navigation Inc. Scrapped at Split, Yugoslavia in July 1968.

== Black Hawk ==
Black Hawk was built by Delta Shipbuilding Company. Her keel was laid on 8 December 1942. She was launched on 18 January 1943 and delivered on 4 February. Built for the WSA, she was operated under the management of United Fruit Company. Torpedoed and damaged in the English Channel 5 nautical miles (9.3 km) south of Portland Bill, United Kingdom (50°28′N 2°28′W) by U-772 on 29 December 1944 whilst on a voyage from Cherbourg, France to Fowey, United Kingdom. Her stern was blown off and sank. The bow section was beached in Worbarrow Bay. She was declared a constructive total loss. The wreck was dispersed by explosives in 1967.

== Boccadasse ==
Boccadasse was built at Genoa in 1950 from parts of two Liberty ships. The bow section of Bert Williams (II), which had been built by New England Shipbuilding Corporation in 1944 was joined to the stern section of Nathaniel Bacon, which had been built by Bethlehem Fairfield Shipyard in 1942. The resulting ship, named Boccadasse, was 471 feet 6 inches (143.71 m) long and assessed at 7,740 GRT. Built for Porto Figari, Genoa. Subsequently, sold to Industriale Maritima, Genoa. Laid up at La Spezia in 1962, She was scrapped at La Spezia in January 1963.

== Bon Air Seam ==
Bon Air Seam was a collier built by Delta Shipbuilding Company. Her keel was laid on 8 February 1945. She was launched on 7 April and delivered on 31 May. Built for the WSA, she was operated under the management of Sprague Steamship Co. Sold to her managers in 1946. Renamed Penobscot in 1948. Sold in 1962 to Marine Navigation Co. and renamed Marine Coaster. Operated under the management of Marine Transport Lines. Scrapped at Hirao in October 1965.

== Booker T. Washington ==
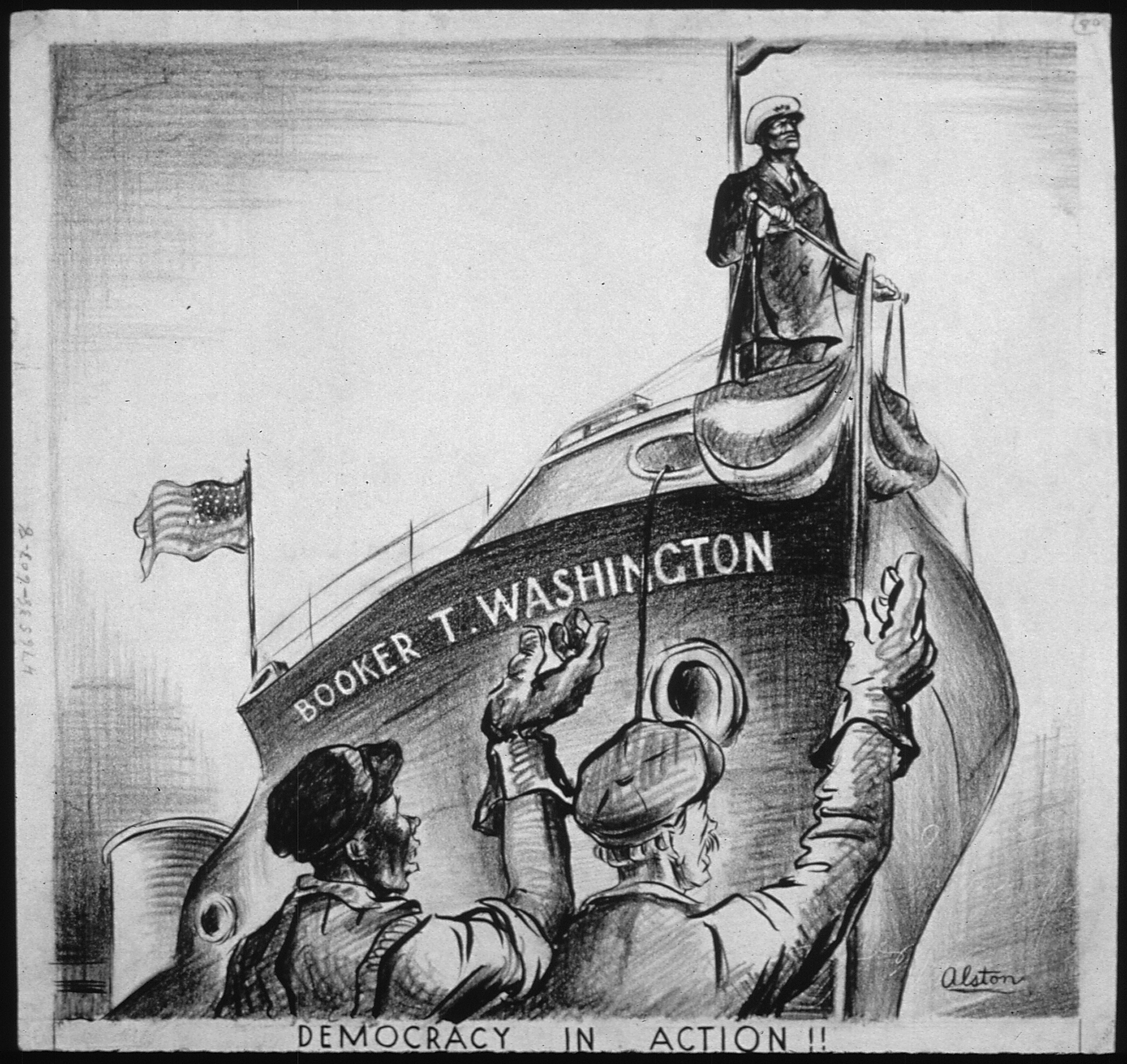
Cartoon showing bow of Booker T. Washington.

Booker T. Washington was built by California Shipbuilding Corporation. Her keel was laid on 19 August 1942. She was launched on 29 September and delivered on 17 October. She was scrapped at Portland, Oregon in July 1969.

== Brander Matthews ==
Brander Matthews was built by Permanente Metals Corporation. Her keel was laid on 14 July 1943. She was launched on 4 August and delivered on 15 August. Built for the WSA, she was operated under the management of Pope & Talbot Inc. To the Dutch Government in 1947 and renamed Valerius. Operated under the management of Koninklijke Java-China Paket Lijnen. Sold in 1950 to NV Maatschappij Zeevaart and renamed Arundo. Operated under the management of Hudig & Veder. Sold in 1955 to Pteroti Compagnia Naviera, Panama and renamed Khios Breeze. Re-registered to Liberia and operated under the management of A. Luisi Ltd. Sold in 1959 to United Sea Transports Inc. and renamed Nymfea. Re-registered to Greece but remaining under the same management. Management transferred to Chios Navigation Co. in 1962. Collided with the Liberian tanker Francesca in the English Channel 10 nautical miles (19 km) south of Beachy Head, United Kingdom on 15 July 1965 and was abandoned. Fourteen of her 29 crew were rescued by the Trinity House vessel Vesta. The rest of her crew were also rescued. Nymfea was towed in to Southampton. Scrapped at Ikeda, Japan in May 1967.

== Brand Whitlock ==
Brand Whitlock was built by California Shipbuilding Corporation. Her keel was laid on 18 June 1943. She was launched on 13 July and delivered on 26 July. Built for the WSA, she was operated under the management of United States Lines. Sold in 1947 to Compania Navigation del Caribe and renamed Navigator. Re-registered to Panama and placed under the management of Lemos & Pateras. Management transferred to Diamantis Pateras Ltd. in 1953. Re-registered to Greece in 1954. Sold in 1960 to Jugoslavenska Tankerska Plovidba, Zadar, Yugoslavia and renamed Kornat. Scrapped at Split in June 1967.

== Bret Harte ==
Bret Harte was built by Oregon Shipbuilding Corporation. Her keel was laid on 19 April 1942. She was launched on 29 May and delivered on 12 June. She was scrapped at Panama City, Florida in December 1963.

== Brigadier General Clinton W. Russell ==
Brigadier General Clinton W. Russell was built by Delta Shipbuilding Corporation. Her keel was laid on 6 April 1944. Launched as Robert W. Bingham on 16 May 1944, she was delivered as Brigadier General Clinton W. Russell on 20 July. An aircraft repair ship for the United States Army, she was returned to the WSA in 1947 and renamed Robert W. Bingham. She was scrapped at New Orleans in 1959.

== Brigham Young ==
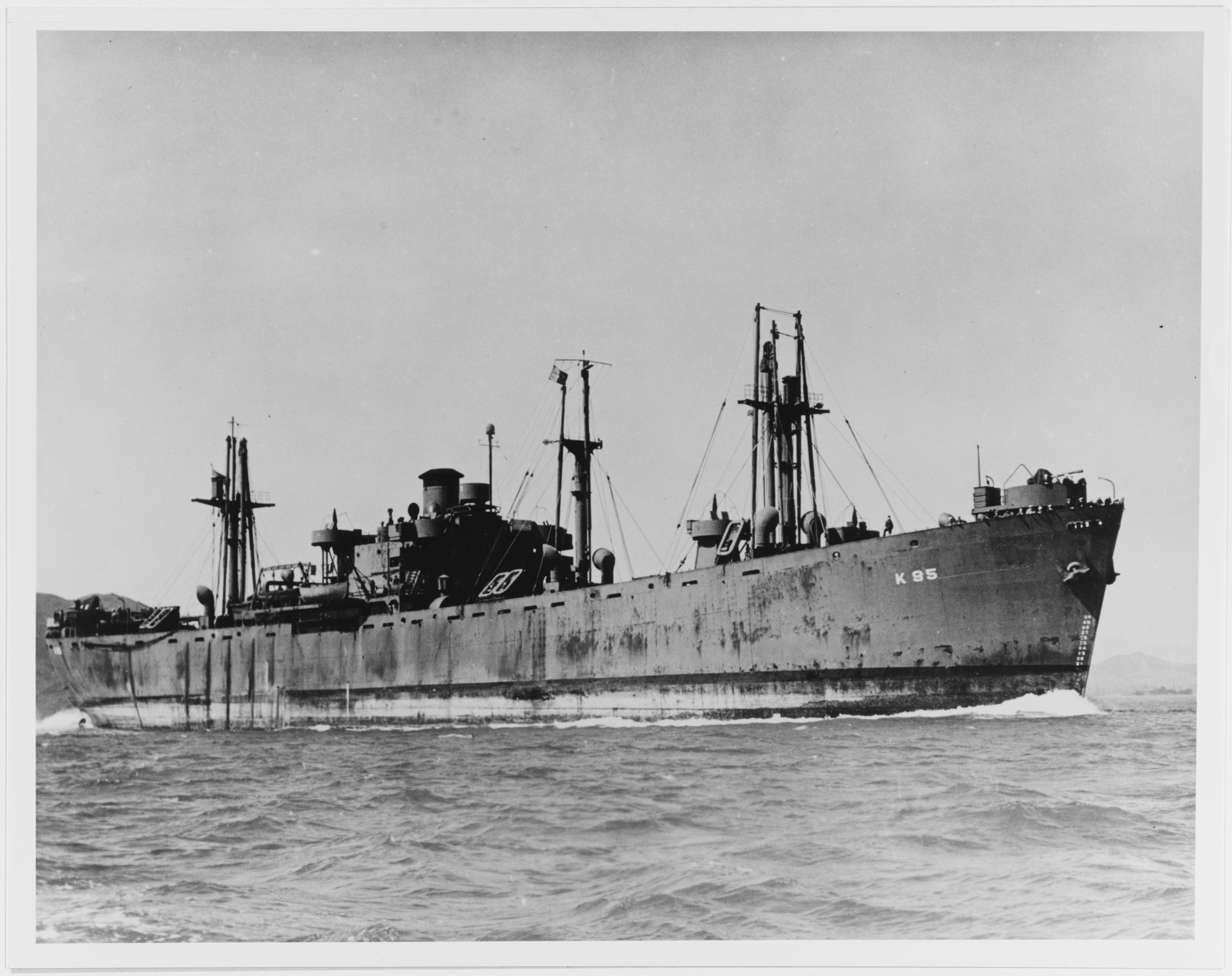
USS Murzim

Brigham Young was built by California Shipbuilding Corporation. Her keel was laid on 10 July 1942. She was launched on 17 August and delivered on 5 September. To United States Navy, converted by Los Angeles Shipbuilding and Dry Dock Company. Decommissioned at Pearl Harbor, Hawaii in June 1946. Towed to San Francisco, California in March 1947. Laid up in Suisun Bay in August. Sold for scrapping outside the United States in March 1973.

== Brockholst Livingston ==
Brockholst Livingston was built by California Shipbuilding Corporation. Her keel was laid on 18 September 1942. She was launched on 21 October and delivered on 7 November. She was driven ashore at Okinawa, Japan in a typhoon on 9 October 1945. Declared a total loss, she was subsequently scrapped by China Merchants & Engineers Inc., China.

== Bronson Alcott ==
Bronson Alcott was built by New England Shipbuilding Corporation. Her keel was laid on 8 November 1943. She was launched on 18 December and delivered as Samavon on 30 December. To MoWT under Lend-Lease, operated under the management of Prince Line. Sold in 1947 to Furness, Withy & Co., London and renamed Pacific Nomad. Sold in 1954 to Panama Steamship Co., Panama and renamed Nikolos. Re-registered to Liberia and placed under the management of S. G. Embiricos. Sold in 1960 to Diana Maritime Corp. and renamed Stamatis. Re-registered to Liberia and placed under the management of Frinton Shipbrokers Ltd. Management transferred to Pegasus Ocean Services Ltd. in 1964. Ran aground 4 nautical miles (7.4 km) south of Madras, India in a typhoon on 3 November 1966 whilst on a voyage from Madras to Calcutta. Wrecked in another typhoon on 10 November. Declared a total loss.

== Burias ==
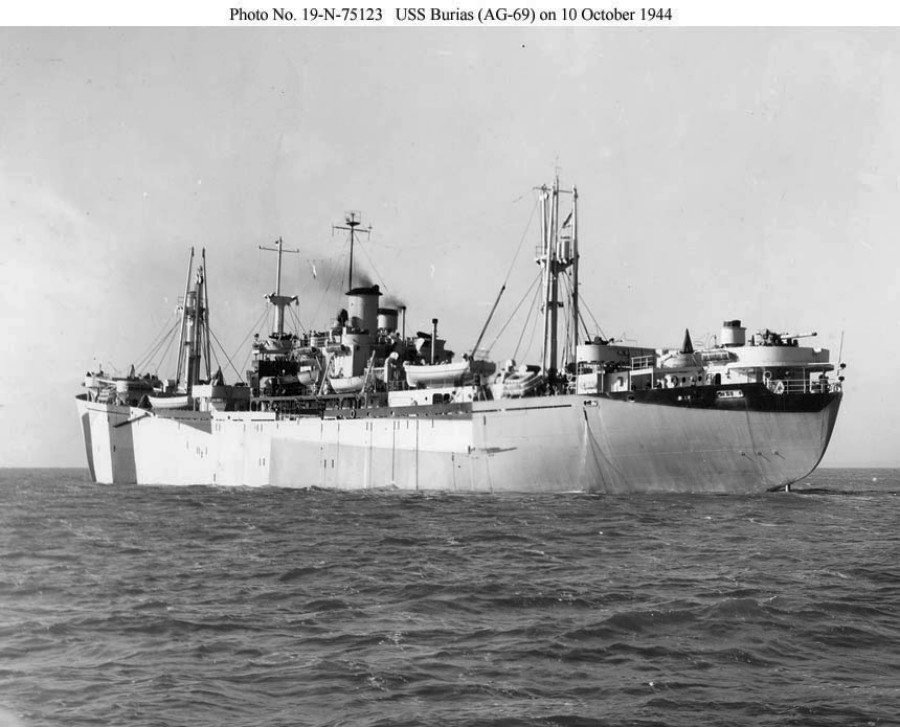
USS Burias

Burias was built by Delta Shipbuilding Company. Her keel was laid on 11 February 1944. She was launched as Mollie Moore Davis on 28 March and delivered to the United States Navy as Burias on 24 April. A repair ship, she was laid up at Pearl Harbor in April 1946. She was towed to San Francisco in August 1947 and returned to the USMC. Laid up in Suisun Bay, she was sold to shipbreakers in Portland, Oregon in June 1976.

== Bushrod Washington ==
Bushrod Washington was built by Bethlehem Fairfield Shipyard. Her keel was laid on 10 March 1943. She was launched on 14 April and delivered on 22 April. Built for the WSA, she was operated under the management of American South African Line. Bombed and caught fire at Salerno, Italy on 14 September 1943. She exploded and sank the next day.

== Button Gwinnett ==
Button Gwinnett was built by Southeastern Shipbuilding Corporation. Her keel was laid on 10 February 1943. She was launched on 2 May and delivered on 31 May. Laid up at Wilmington, North Carolina post-war, she was scrapped at Panama City, Florida in December 1968.

== Byron Darnton ==
Byron Darnton was built by Bethlehem Fairfield Shipyard. Her keel was laid on 25 November 1943. She was launched on 16 December and delivered on 24 December. She came ashore on Sanda Island, United Kingdom (55°17′N 5°35′W) on 16 March 1946 whilst on a voyage from Copenhagen, Denmark to the United States. She broke in two and was declared a total loss. The wreck was scrapped in situ in October 1953.

== Sources ==
- Sawyer, L. A.; Mitchell, W. H. (1985). The Liberty Ships (2nd ed.). London: Lloyd's of London Press Ltd. ISBN 1-85044-049-2.
