= Benjamin Rush (disambiguation) =

Benjamin Rush (1746–1813) was an American revolutionary and a Founding Father of the United States.

Benjamin Rush may also refer to

- Benjamin Rush (lawyer) (1811–1877), American lawyer and writer
- Benjamin Rush, a character in 13 Ghosts
- USRC Benjamin Rush, a United States Revenue Cutter stationed at Presque Isle, Pennsylvania
- SS Benjamin Rush, a Liberty ship
