= SS Benjamin F. Coston =

World War II Liberty ship of the United States

History

United States
- Name: Benjamin F. Coston
- Namesake: Benjamin F. Coston
- Owner: War Shipping Administration (WSA)
- Operator: Union Sulphur & Oil Co. Inc.
- Ordered: as type (EC2-S-C1) hull, MC hull 2318
- Builder: J.A. Jones Construction, Panama City, Florida
- Cost: $925,723
- Yard number: 59
- Way number: 3
- Laid down: 31 July 1944
- Launched: 6 September 1944
- Completed: 23 September 1944
- Identification: Call sign: KSSN
- Fate: Placed in National Defense Reserve Fleet, Hudson River Reserve Fleet, Jones Point, New York, 14 May 1946; Placed in National Defense Reserve Fleet, Wilmington, North Carolina, 21 September 1947; Sold for scrapping, 8 October 1964

General characteristics
- Class & type: Liberty ship; type EC2-S-C1, standard
- Tonnage: 10,865 LT DWT; 7,176 GRT
- Displacement: 3,380 long tons (3,434 t) (light); 14,245 long tons (14,474 t) (max)
- Length: 441 feet 6 inches (135 m) oa; 416 feet (127 m) pp; 427 feet (130 m) lwl
- Beam: 57 feet (17 m)
- Draft: 27 ft 9.25 in (8.4646 m)
- Installed power: 2 × Oil fired 450 °F (232 °C) boilers, operating at 220 psi (1,500 kPa); 2,500 hp (1,900 kW)
- Propulsion: 1 × triple-expansion steam engine, (manufactured by General Machinery Corp., Hamilton, Ohio); 1 × screw propeller
- Speed: 11.5 knots (21.3 km/h; 13.2 mph)
- Capacity: 562,608 cubic feet (15,931 m^{3}) (grain); 499,573 cubic feet (14,146 m^{3}) (bale)
- Complement: 38–62 USMM; 21–40 USNAG
- Armament: Varied by ship; Bow-mounted 3-inch (76 mm)/50-caliber gun; Stern-mounted 4-inch (102 mm)/50-caliber gun; 2–8 × single 20-millimeter (0.79 in) Oerlikon anti-aircraft (AA) cannons and/or, 2–8 × 37-millimeter (1.46 in) M1 AA guns

SS Benjamin F. Coston was a Liberty ship built in the United States during World War II. She was named after Benjamin F. Coston, a US Navy officer and scientist. Coston was the chief scientist at the Washington Navy Yard, and is credited with inventing the Coston Signal Flare.

== Construction ==
Benjamin F. Coston was laid down on 31 July 1944, under a Maritime Commission (MARCOM) contract, MC hull 2318, by J.A. Jones Construction, Panama City, Florida; and launched on 6 September 1944.

== History ==
She was allocated to Union Sulphur & Oil Co., Inc., 23 September 1944. On 27 October 1945, she struck a mine while sailing to Genoa, Italy. On 14 May 1946, she was laid up in the National Defense Reserve Fleet, Hudson River Reserve Fleet, Jones Point, New York.

She was reallocated to Union Sulphur & Oil Co. Inc., 10 July 1946, 28 March 1947, and 15 August 1947, before being placed in the National Defense Reserve Fleet, Wilmington, North Carolina, 21 September 1947.

She was sold for scrapping, 9 July 1964, to Imperial Salvage Corp., for $48,620. She was withdrawn from the fleet, 8 October 1964.

== Bibliography ==
- "Jones Construction, Panama City FL". www.ShipbuildingHistory.com. 13 October 2010.
- Maritime Administration. "Benjamin F. Coston". Ship History Database Vessel Status Card. U.S. Department of Transportation, Maritime Administration. This article incorporates text from this source, which is in the public domain.
- Davies, James (May 2004). "Specifications (As-Built)" (PDF). p. 23.
- "SS Benjamin F. Coston".
