= USS Belle Isle =

Cargo ship of the United States Navy

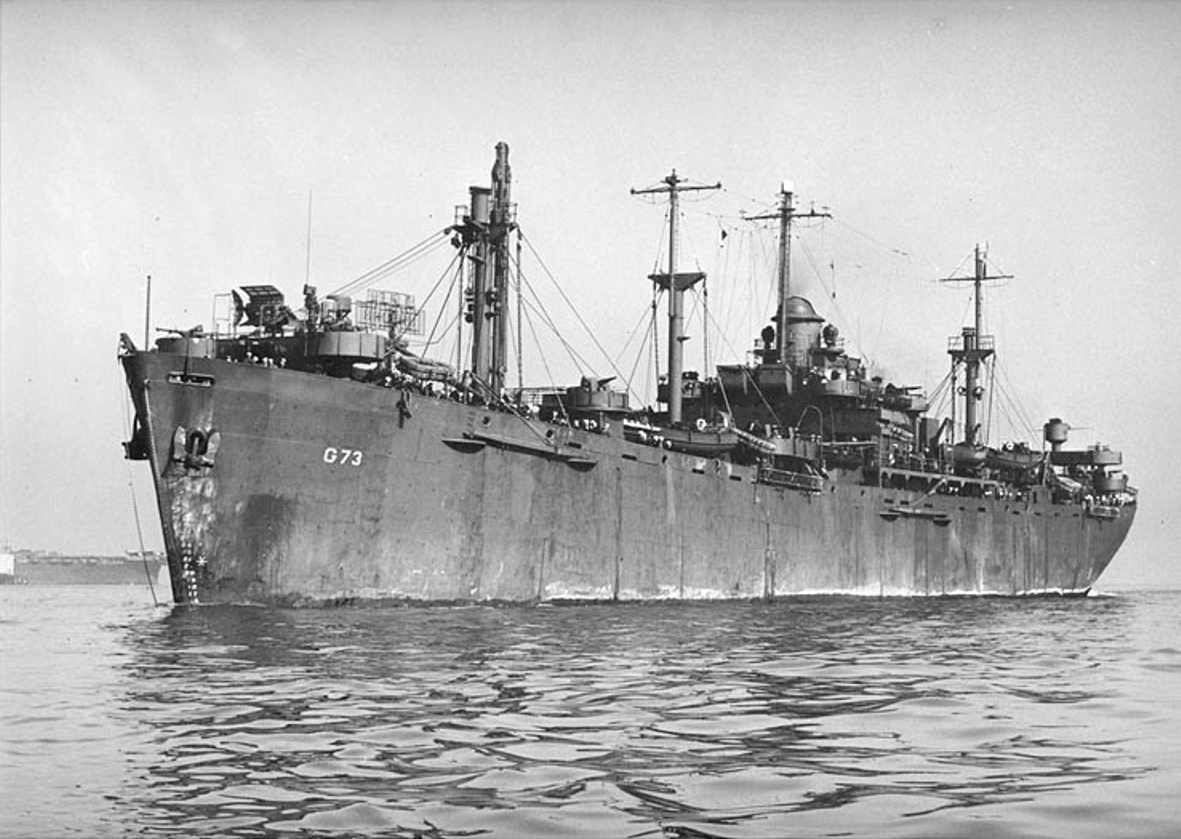
- USS Belle Isle (AG-73) In San Francisco Bay, California, c. April 1946. Note the electronics antennas on the forecastle, used for repairing electronics equipment. The stern of USS Saratoga (CV-3) is in the background at left.

History

United States
- Name: Belle Isle
- Namesake: An island in the Strait of Belle Isle
- Builder: New England Shipbuilding Corporation, South Portland, Maine
- Laid down: 19 September 1944 as EC2-S-C1 hull, (MCE hull 3070)
- Launched: 3 November 1944
- Christened: Miss Sally Goding
- Commissioned: 15 November 1944 as USS Belle Isle (AG-73)
- Recommissioned: 13 July 1945
- Decommissioned: 18 November 1944 and 30 August 1946, at San Diego, California
- Reclassified: AKS-21, 18 August 1951
- Refit: Bethlehem Steel Company, Hoboken, New Jersey
- Stricken: 1 April 1960
- Fate: possibly sunk as a target in 1960

General characteristics
- Type: Basilan-class miscellaneous auxiliary
- Displacement: 5,371 tons light; 14,350 tons full load
- Length: 441 ft 6 in (134.57 m)
- Beam: 56 ft 11 in (17.35 m)
- Draft: 23 ft (7.0 m)
- Propulsion: reciprocating steam engine, single propeller, 2,500shp
- Speed: 12.5 knots
- Complement: 895 officers and enlisted
- Armament: one single 5 in (130 mm) dual purpose gun mount; four single 40 mm AA gun mounts

USS Belle Isle (AG-73/AKS-21) was a Basilan-class miscellaneous auxiliary acquired by the U.S. Navy during World War II. Belle Isle was configured as a repair ship and used in Pacific Ocean operations. At war's end she was converted to a stores ship before being finally decommissioned.

== Constructed in Maine ==
Belle Isle (AG 73) was laid down on 19 September 1944 at South Portland, Maine, by the New England Shipbuilding Corporation under a U.S. Maritime Commission contract (MCE hull 3070); launched on 3 November 1944; sponsored by Miss Sally Goding; transferred to the Navy on a loan basis on 15 November 1944; commissioned that same day for the voyage to the conversion yard; decommissioned on 18 November 1944 at Hoboken, New Jersey, for conversion to an electronics repair ship by the Bethlehem Steel Corporation; and recommissioned on 13 July 1945.

== World War II-related service ==
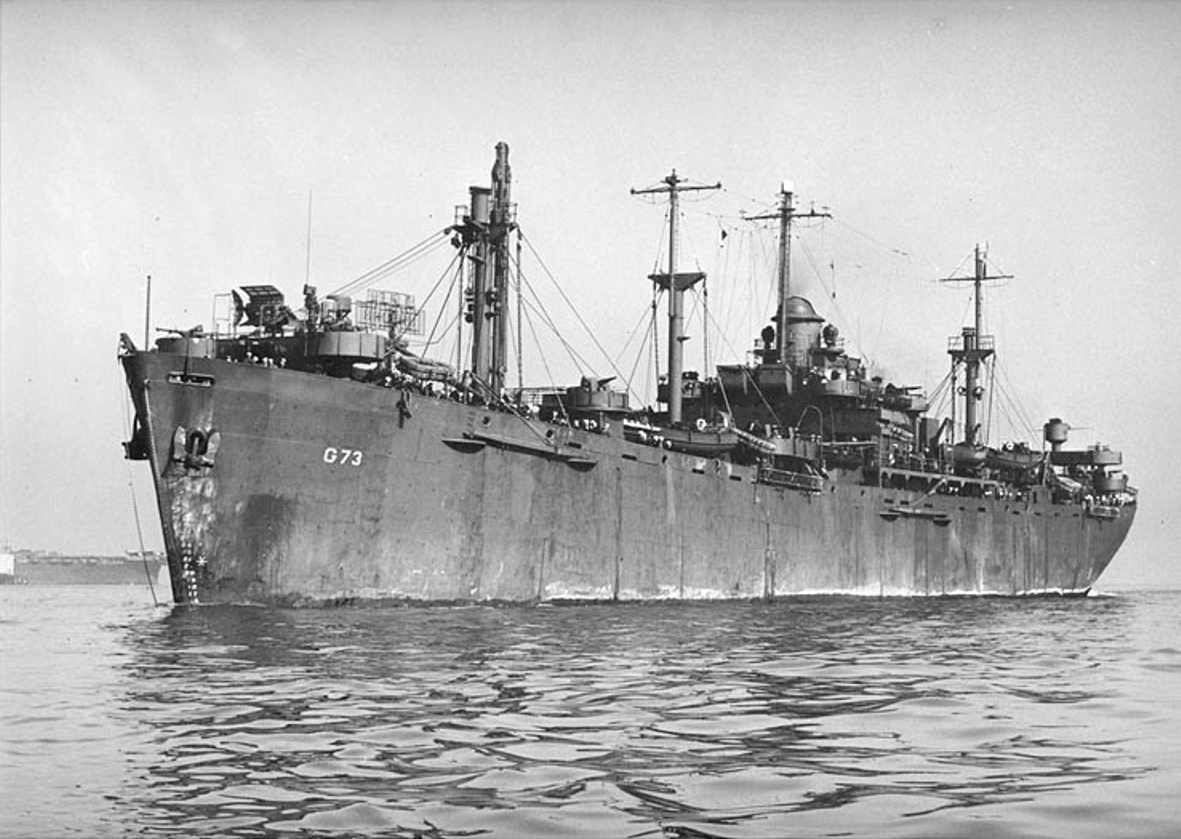

Belle Isle was assigned to Service Division (ServDiv) 104, Service Squadron (ServRon) 10, U.S. Pacific Fleet, and, by 7 October, was at Okinawa in the Ryukyu Islands making repairs for ships of the Pacific Fleet.

She served at Okinawa until heading for Japan early in December. The ship arrived at Wakayama on 15 December and began repair duties for the occupation forces. That assignment lasted until she departed Japan on 31 March 1946 and headed back to the United States.

== Post-war decommissioning ==
After making port at San Francisco, California, the electronics repair ship shifted south to San Diego, California, to prepare for inactivation. She was decommissioned on 30 August 1946 and berthed with the San Diego Group, Pacific Reserve Fleet.

== Temporary reactivation ==
On 18 August 1951, while still in reserve, Belle Isle was reclassified a stores issue ship and redesignated AKS-211.

== Final decommissioning ==
She remained in reserve until 1960. On 1 April 1960, her name was struck from the Naval Vessel Register. Her disposal was approved on 3 August 1960, and she was apparently sunk as a target later that year.

In November 1960, the ships in Destroyer Squadron 13 sank the Belle Isle off the coast of San Diego.
