= SS Bjarne A. Lia =

Liberty ship of WWII

History

United States
- Name: Bjarne A. Lia
- Namesake: Bjarne A. Lia
- Owner: War Shipping Administration (WSA)
- Operator: Moore-McCormack Lines, Inc.
- Ordered: as type (EC2-S-C1) hull, MC hull 2332
- Builder: J.A. Jones Construction, Panama City, Florida
- Cost: $950,315
- Yard number: 73
- Way number: 6
- Laid down: 31 October 1944
- Launched: 30 November 1944
- Sponsored by: Mrs. Bjarne A. Lia
- Completed: 12 December 1944
- Identification: Call sign: ANBP
- Fate: Sold for commercial use, 24 May 1949

United States
- Name: Frederic C. Collin
- Owner: Drytrans Inc.
- Fate: Sold, 1958

Liberia
- Name: Penn Trader
- Owner: Bulkcargo Shipping Corp.
- Operator: Penn Shipping Co.
- Fate: Sold, 1964

United States
- Name: Hanover
- Owner: Pan American Tankers Corp.
- Operator: George T. Bates & Co.
- Fate: Sold, 1966

Liberia
- Name: Santa Sofia
- Owner: Santa Sofia Cia Armadora, Panama
- Fate: Sold, 1966

Liberia
- Name: Sigalpha
- Owner: Ocean Transport Co.
- Operator: Neris Carbon and Oil Corp.
- Fate: Sold, 1967

Liberia
- Name: Sigalpha
- Owner: Coast Navigation Inc.
- Operator: Hugo Neu Corp
- Fate: Sold for scrapping, 1968

General characteristics
- Class & type: Liberty ship; type EC2-S-C1, standard
- Tonnage: 10,865 LT DWT; 7,176 GRT
- Displacement: 3,380 long tons (3,434 t) (light); 14,245 long tons (14,474 t) (max)
- Length: 441 feet 6 inches (135 m) oa; 416 feet (127 m) pp; 427 feet (130 m) lwl
- Beam: 57 feet (17 m)
- Draft: 27 ft 9.25 in (8.4646 m)
- Installed power: 2 × Oil fired 450 °F (232 °C) boilers, operating at 220 psi (1,500 kPa); 2,500 hp (1,900 kW)
- Propulsion: 1 × triple-expansion steam engine, (manufactured by Filer and Stowell, Milwaukee, Wisconsin); 1 × screw propeller
- Speed: 11.5 knots (21.3 km/h; 13.2 mph)
- Capacity: 562,608 cubic feet (15,931 m^{3}) (grain); 499,573 cubic feet (14,146 m^{3}) (bale)
- Complement: 38–62 USMM; 21–40 USNAG
- Armament: Varied by ship; Bow-mounted 3-inch (76 mm)/50-caliber gun; Stern-mounted 4-inch (102 mm)/50-caliber gun; 2–8 × single 20-millimeter (0.79 in) Oerlikon anti-aircraft (AA) cannons and/or, 2–8 × 37-millimeter (1.46 in) M1 AA guns

SS Bjarne A. Lia was a Liberty ship built in the United States during World War II. She was named after Bjarne A. Lia.

== Construction ==
Bjarne A. Lia was laid down on 31 October 1944, under a Maritime Commission (MARCOM) contract, MC hull 2332, by J.A. Jones Construction, Panama City, Florida; sponsored by Mrs. Bjarne A. Lia, widow of the namesake, and launched on 30 November 1944.

== History ==
She was allocated to the Moore-McCormack Lines, Inc., 14 December 1944.

She was sold into commercial service in 1949 and after a series of sales and name changes she was scrapped on 29 June 1968 in Split.

== Bibliography ==
- "Jones Construction, Panama City FL". www.ShipbuildingHistory.com. 13 October 2010.
- Maritime Administration. "Bjarne A. Lia". Ship History Database Vessel fate Card. U.S. Department of Transportation, Maritime Administration. This article incorporates text from this source, which is in the public domain.
- Davies, James (May 2004). "Specifications (As-Built)" (PDF). p. 23.
- "SS Bjarne A. Lia".
