= SS Betty Zane =

World War II Liberty ship of the United States

History

United States
- Name: Betty Zane
- Namesake: Betty Zane
- Builder: North Carolina Shipbuilding Company, Wilmington, North Carolina
- Yard number: 51
- Way number: 6
- Laid down: 20 November 1942
- Launched: 22 December 1942
- Acquired: 31 December 1942
- Renamed: Anastassios Pateras
- Fate: Scrapped 1968

General characteristics
- Type: Liberty ship
- Tonnage: 7,000 long tons deadweight (DWT)
- Length: 441 ft 6 in (134.57 m)
- Beam: 56 ft 11 in (17.35 m)
- Draft: 27 ft 9 in (8.46 m)
- Propulsion: Two oil-fired boilers; Triple expansion steam engine; Single screw; 2,500 hp (1,864 kW)
- Speed: 11 knots (20 km/h; 13 mph)
- Capacity: 9,140 tons cargo
- Complement: 41
- Armament: 1 × Stern-mounted 4 in (100 mm) deck gun, at least 1 x Oerlikon 20 mm cannon; AA guns

SS Betty Zane (MC contract 873) was a Liberty ship built in the United States during World War II. She was named after Betty Zane, a frontier heroine of the American Revolutionary War and ancestor of author Zane Grey.

The ship was laid down by North Carolina Shipbuilding Company in their Cape Fear River yard on November 20, 1942, then launched on December 22, 1942. Zane was operated by the States Marine Corporation for the War Shipping Administration until December 1946 when she entered the National Defense Reserve Fleet at Wilmington, North Carolina.

In November 1943 while in the Mediterranean Sea she was attacked by numerous German aircraft, downing a Ju 88. Zane was sold to a Greek firm in December 1946 and renamed Anastassios Pateras. She was scrapped in 1968
