= SS Benjamin Rush =

Liberty ship of WWII

History

United States
- Name: Benjamin Rush
- Namesake: Benjamin Rush
- Owner: War Shipping Administration (WSA)
- Operator: United Fruit Co.
- Ordered: as type (EC2-S-C1) hull, MCE hull 303
- Awarded: 1 May 1941
- Builder: Bethlehem-Fairfield Shipyard, Baltimore, Maryland
- Cost: $1,068,694
- Yard number: 2053
- Way number: 16
- Laid down: 13 December 1941
- Launched: 25 June 1942
- Sponsored by: Mrs. Benjamin Rush Jr.
- Completed: 11 July 1942
- Identification: Call sign: KETT
- Fate: Sold for scrapping, 29 April 1954

General characteristics
- Class & type: Liberty ship; type EC2-S-C1, standard
- Tonnage: 10,865 LT DWT; 7,176 GRT
- Displacement: 3,380 long tons (3,434 t) (light); 14,245 long tons (14,474 t) (max)
- Length: 441 feet 6 inches (135 m) oa; 416 feet (127 m) pp; 427 feet (130 m) lwl
- Beam: 57 feet (17 m)
- Draft: 27 ft 9.25 in (8.4646 m)
- Installed power: 2 × Oil fired 450 °F (232 °C) boilers, operating at 220 psi (1,500 kPa); 2,500 hp (1,900 kW)
- Propulsion: 1 × triple-expansion steam engine, (manufactured by General Machinery Corp., Hamilton, Ohio); 1 × screw propeller
- Speed: 11.5 knots (21.3 km/h; 13.2 mph)
- Capacity: 562,608 cubic feet (15,931 m^{3}) (grain); 499,573 cubic feet (14,146 m^{3}) (bale)
- Complement: 38–62 USMM; 21–40 USNAG
- Armament: Varied by ship; Bow-mounted 3-inch (76 mm)/50-caliber gun; Stern-mounted 4-inch (102 mm)/50-caliber gun; 2–8 × single 20-millimeter (0.79 in) Oerlikon anti-aircraft (AA) cannons and/or, 2–8 × 37-millimeter (1.46 in) M1 AA guns

SS Benjamin Rush was a Liberty ship built in the United States during World War II. She was named after Founding Father Benjamin Rush, a signatory to the United States Declaration of Independence and a civic leader in Philadelphia, where he was a physician, politician, social reformer, humanitarian, and educator as well as the founder of Dickinson College. Rush attended the Continental Congress. He served as Surgeon General of the Continental Army and became a professor of chemistry, medical theory, and clinical practice at the University of Pennsylvania.

== Construction ==
Benjamin Rush was laid down on 13 December 1941, under a Maritime Commission (MARCOM) contract, MCE hull 303, by the Bethlehem-Fairfield Shipyard, Baltimore, Maryland; she was sponsored by Mrs. Benjamin Rush Jr., the wife of the vice president of Industrial Insurance Company of America, and was launched on 25 June 1942.

== History ==
She was allocated to United Fruit Co., on 11 July 1942. On 24 October 1947, she was laid up in the James River Reserve Fleet, Lee Hall, Virginia. A fire on 13 December 1948, burned out the midship house, causing an estimated $250,000—$265,000 in damages. She was recommended for scrapping on 21 December 1951, instead of repairing. On 29 April 1954, she was sold for scrapping to Boston Metals Co., along with four of her sister ships for $353,885. She was removed from the fleet on 9 May 1954.

== Bibliography ==
- "Bethlehem-Fairfield, Baltimore MD". www.ShipbuildingHistory.com. 14 August 2008.
- Maritime Administration. "Benjamin Rush". Ship History Database Vessel Status Card. U.S. Department of Transportation, Maritime Administration.
- Davies, James (May 2004). "Specifications (As-Built)" (PDF). p. 23.
- "SS Benjamin Rush".
