= List of Victory ships =

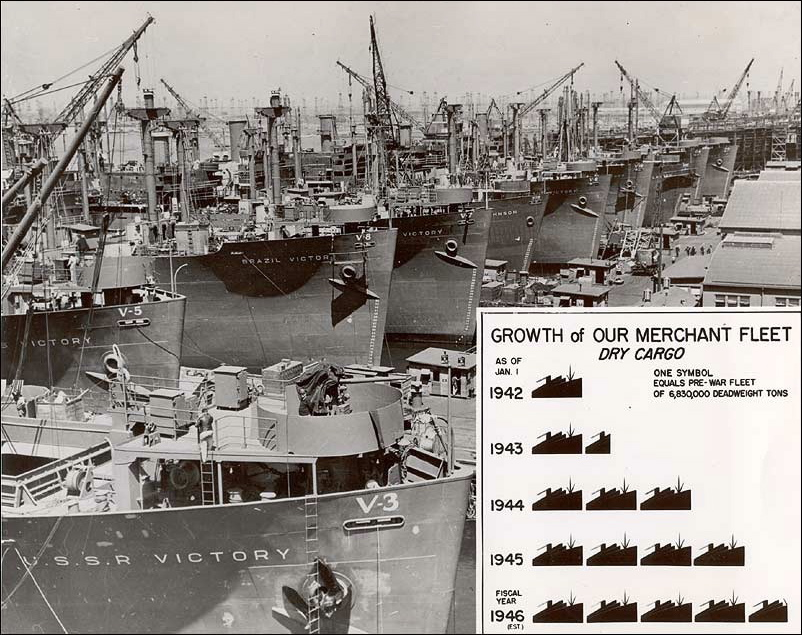
Victory ships under construction at California Shipbuilding, c. April 1944, are seen in this press photo released by the War Shipping Administration in May 1945.

This is a list of Victory ships. Victory ships were a type of cargo ship which were mass-produced in the United States during World War II.

== List ==
In the following list, Keel refers to the date of the keel laying, Launch to the launch date, and Delivery to the ship's completion date.

The MC Hull No. is a unique number assigned by the United States Maritime Commission (MC for Maritime Commission).

Gaps in the hull numbers correspond to ships whose contracts were cancelled.

List of all Victory ships
MC Hull No.	Ship	Type	Keel	Launch	Delivery	Notes
1	SS China Victory	VC2-S-AP3	28 November 1943	26 January 1944	1 April 1944	Named for Republic of China
2	SS Greece Victory	VC2-S-AP3	7 December 1943	3 February 1944	14 April 1944	Named for Greece
3	SS U.S.S.R. Victory	VC2-S-AP3	3 January 1944	26 February 1944	26 April 1944	Ship marked V-3 in foreground Victory Ships Sank on 2 Jan. 1961, off the coast of England.
4	SS United States Victory	VC2-S-AP3	9 January 1944	6 March 1944	30 April 1944	16 April 1945 was damaged at the battle at Okinawa, repaired.
5	SS Philippines Victory	VC2-S-AP3	17 January 1944	11 March 1944	9 May 1944	Second ship marked V-5 in photo of Victory Ships Sank 1952 after collision in the English Channel.
6	SS New Zealand Victory	VC2-S-AP3	25 January 1944	20 March 1944	13 May 1944	
7	SS Mexico Victory	VC2-S-AP3	26 January 1944	27 March 1944	19 May 1944	Fourth ship marked V-7 in photo Victory Ships
8	SS Brazil Victory	VC2-S-AP3	3 February 1944	30 March 1944	26 May 1944	Third ship marked V-8 in photo Victory Ships
9	SS Panama Victory	VC2-S-AP3	5 February 1944	3 April 1944	30 May 1944	
10	SS Colombia Victory	VC2-S-AP3	11 February 1944	10 April 1944	31 May 1944	Became USS Betelgeuse (AK-260). In August 1967 collision with the submarine USS Simon Bolivar, repaired.
11	SS Atchison Victory	VC2-S-AP3	17 February 1944	22 April 1944	8 June 1944	
12	SS Joplin Victory	VC2-S-AP3	24 February 1944	25 April 1944	15 June 1944	
13	SS Lincoln Victory	VC2-S-AP3	26 February 1944	27 April 1944	15 June 1944	Sold: became Aardijk, then the Sian Yung, half sunk Bay of Panama in 1970.
14	SS Sapulpa Victory	VC2-S-AP3	26 February 1944	29 April 1944	19 June 1944	
15	SS Navajo Victory	VC2-S-AP3	5 March 1944	2 May 1944	30 June 1944	
16	SS Bluefield Victory	VC2-S-AP3	7 March 1944	9 May 1944	30 June 1944	
17	SS Luray Victory	VC2-S-AP3	11 March 1944	11 May 1944	26 June 1944	Wrecked and sank on Goodwin Sands in 1946.
18	SS Greenville Victory	VC2-S-AP3	21 March 1944	24 May 1944	8 July 1944	Became USNS Greenville Victory (T-AK-237).
19	SS Durham Victory	VC2-S-AP3	30 March 1944	26 May 1944	5 July 1944	
20	SS Kingsport Victory	VC2-S-AP3	4 April 1944	29 May 1944	12 July 1944	Became USNS Kingsport (T-AG-164), a satellite communications ship.
21	SS Dalton Victory	VC2-S-AP3	8 April 1944	6 June 1944	19 July 1944	Became USNS Dalton Victory (T-AK-256), a missile range instrumentation ship.
22	SS Gainesville Victory	VC2-S-AP3	11 April 1944	9 June 1944	22 July 1944	
23	SS Selma Victory	VC2-S-AP3	23 April 1944	16 June 1944	29 July 1944	
24	SS Meridian Victory	VC2-S-AP3	26 April 1944	20 June 1944	5 August 1944	
25	USS Haskell (APA-117)	VC2-S-AP5	27 May 1944	17 July 1944	25 August 1944	The lead ship of her class of US Navy attack transports for World War II.
26	USS Hendry (APA-118)	VC2-S-AP5	30 May 1944	6 August 1944	21 October 1944	
27	SS Carroll Victory	VC2-S-AP3	28 March 1944	13 June 1944	31 August 1944	Named for Carroll, Iowa. One of 46 Seagoing Cowboys Victory ships, in 1949 became US Coast Guard ship.
28	USS Highlands (APA-119)	VC2-S-AP5	13 June 1944	21 August 1944	31 October 1944	
29	SS Sharon Victory	VC2-S-AP3	15 April 1944	24 June 1944	28 September 1944	
30	USS Hinsdale (APA-120)	VC2-S-AP5	21 June 1944	28 August 1944	31 October 1944	Kamikaze attack damage on 1 April 1945 at Okinawa.
31	SS Pomona Victory	VC2-S-AP3	29 April 1944	26 June 1944	31 July 1944	With Westminster Victory converted & transferred to Compaguie Maritime Belge SA Antwerp for service between Belgian Congo and Antwerp. Title transferred 29 March 1947.
32	SS Clovis Victory	VC2-S-AP3	28 April 1944	8 July 1944	29 September 1944	
33	SS Grange Victory	VC2-S-AP3	3 May 1944	28 June 1944	7 August 1944	
34	USS Hocking (APA-121)	VC2-S-AP5	7 June 1944	25 July 1944	31 August 1944	
35	USS Kenton (APA-122)	VC2-S-AP5	26 June 1944	1 September 1944	10 November 1944	
36	USS Kittson (APA-123)	VC2-S-AP5	25 June 1944	29 August 1944	22 December 1944	
37	SS Waco Victory	VC2-S-AP3	12 May 1944	22 July 1944	14 October 1944	
38	USS La Grange (APA-124)	VC2-S-AP5	10 June 1944	27 July 1944	3 September 1944	On 13 August 1945 damaged in last kamikaze attack of WW2, 21 sailors killed and 89 wounded.
39	USS Lanier (APA-125)	VC2-S-AP5	29 June 1944	4 September 1944	14 November 1944	
40	USS St. Mary's (APA-126)	VC2-S-AP5	16 June 1944	1 August 1944	17 September 1944	
41	SS Arcadia Victory	VC2-S-AP3	10 May 1944	1 July 1944	22 September 1944	Became USNS Asterion (T-AF-63).
42	SS Alamo Victory	VC2-S-AP3	25 May 1944	13 July 1944	18 August 1944	
43	USS Allendale (APA-127)	VC2-S-AP5	1 July 1944	9 September 1944	21 November 1944	
44	USS Arenac (APA-128)	VC2-S-AP5	9 July 1944	14 September 1944	28 December 1944	
45	USS Marvin H. McIntyre (APA-129)	VC2-S-AP5	12 May 1944	21 September 1944	25 November 1944	planned as Arlington (APA-129)
46	USS Attala (APA-130)	VC2-S-AP5	18 July 1944	27 September 1944	30 November 1944	
47	USS Bandera (APA-131)	VC2-S-AP5	23 July 1944	6 October 1944	30 November 1944	
48	USS Barnwell (APA-132)	VC2-S-AP5	25 July 1944	30 September 1944	19 January 1945	
49	USS Beckham (APA-133)	VC2-S-AP5	27 July 1944	14 October 1944	9 December 1944	
50	USS Bland (APA-134)	VC2-S-AP5	2 August 1944	26 October 1944	14 December 1944	
51	USS Bosque (APA-135)	VC2-S-AP5	7 August 1944	28 October 1944	17 December 1944	
52	USS Botetourt (APA-136)	VC2-S-AP5	22 August 1944	19 October 1944	31 January 1945	
53	USS Bowie (APA-137)	VC2-S-AP5	28 August 1944	31 October 1944	21 December 1944	
54	USS Braxton (APA-138)	VC2-S-AP5	29 August 1944	3 November 1944	27 December 1944	
55	USS Broadwater (APA-139)	VC2-S-AP5	1 September 1944	5 November 1944	31 December 1944	
56	USS Brookings (APA-140)	VC2-S-AP5	5 September 1944	20 November 1944	31 December 1944	
57	USS Buckingham (APA-141)	VC2-S-AP5	9 September 1944	13 November 1944	23 January 1945	
58	USS Clearfield (APA-142)	VC2-S-AP5	15 September 1944	21 November 1944	31 December 1944	
59	USS Clermont (APA-143)	VC2-S-AP5	21 September 1944	25 November 1944	27 January 1945	
60	USS Clinton (APA-144)	VC2-S-AP5	27 September 1944	29 November 1944	31 January 1945	
61	USS Colbert (APA-145)	VC2-S-AP5	30 September 1944	1 December 1944	6 February 1945	Mine damage on 17 September 1945, off Okinawa
62	USS Collingsworth (APA-146)	VC2-S-AP5	6 October 1944	2 December 1944	26 February 1945	
67	SS Jericho Victory	VC2-S-AP2	15 October 1944	6 December 1944	13 January 1945	
68	SS Koloa Victory	VC2-S-AP2	19 October 1944	12 December 1944	18 January 1945	
69	SS Cody Victory	VC2-S-AP2	26 October 1944	15 December 1944	22 January 1945	Sank 1968 off coast of San Francisco.
70	SS Sioux Falls Victory	VC2-S-AP2	29 October 1944	19 December 1944	25 January 1945	
71	SS Flagstaff Victory	VC2-S-AP2	31 October 1944	22 December 1944	29 January 1945	
72	SS Anadarko Victory	VC2-S-AP2	3 November 1944	27 December 1944	31 January 1945	
73	SS Taos Victory	VC2-S-AP2	6 November 1944	29 December 1944	31 January 1945	
74	SS Douglas Victory	VC2-S-AP2	13 November 1944	9 January 1945	7 February 1945	
75	SS Texarkana Victory	VC2-S-AP2	20 November 1944	11 January 1945	10 February 1945	
76	SS Bartlesville Victory	VC2-S-AP2	21 November 1944	13 January 1945	13 February 1945	
77	SS Cedar Rapids Victory	VC2-S-AP2	25 November 1944	14 January 1945	17 February 1945	
78	SS Chanute Victory	VC2-S-AP2	29 November 1944	19 January 1945	20 February 1945	
79	SS Monroe Victory	VC2-S-AP2	1 December 1944	24 January 1945	23 February 1945	
80	SS Clarksdale Victory	VC2-S-AP2	2 December 1944	27 January 1945	26 February 1945	Wrecked on the British Columbia coastline off Hippa Reef Island (Graham Island), 24 November 1947
81	SS Alhambra Victory	VC2-S-AP2	6 December 1944	31 January 1945	28 February 1945	
82	SS Rutgers Victory	VC2-S-AP2	12 December 1944	2 February 1945	5 March 1945	Named for Rutgers University.
83	SS Dickinson Victory	VC2-S-AP2	15 December 1944	9 February 1945	1 March 1945	Named for Dickinson College.
84	SS Colby Victory	VC2-S-AP2	19 December 1944	13 February 1945	12 March 1945	Named for Colby College.
85	SS United Victory	VC2-S-AP3	19 November 1943	12 January 1944	29 February 1944	
86	SS Czechoslovakia Victory	VC2-S-AP3	25 November 1943	20 February 1944	11 March 1944	Became the USNS Lt. James E. Robinson (T-AK-274), lead of her class of cargo ships.
87	SS Poland Victory	VC2-S-AP3	30 November 1943	27 January 1944	19 March 1944	
88	SS Britain Victory	VC2-S-AP3	12 December 1943	4 February 1944	25 March 1944	
89	SS Norway Victory	VC2-S-AP3	17 December 1943	12 February 1944	31 March 1944	
90	SS Luxembourg Victory	VC2-S-AP3	26 December 1943	28 February 1944	5 April 1944	Sank 9 January 1952 in the North Pacific, crew lost.
91	SS Netherlands Victory	VC2-S-AP3	1 January 1944	6 March 1944	10 April 1944	
92	SS Belgium Victory	VC2-S-AP3	6 January 1944	13 March 1944	14 April 1944	
93	SS Canada Victory	VC2-S-AP3	22 January 1944	20 March 1944	19 April 1944	Sank in action 27 April 1945, lost 3 crew members.
94	SS Iran Victory	VC2-S-AP3	25 January 1944	24 March 1944	4 May 1944	Became USS Belmont (AGTR-4), a technical research ship.
95	SS El Salvador Victory	VC2-S-AP3	28 January 1944	1 April 1944	27 April 1944	
96	SS Dominican Victory	VC2-S-AP3	31 January 1944	6 April 1944	9 May 1944	
97	SS South Africa Victory	VC2-S-AP3	2 February 1944	11 April 1944	4 May 1944	
98	SS Yugoslavia Victory	VC2-S-AP3	5 February 1944	15 April 1944	7 May 1944	
99	SS Plymouth Victory	VC2-S-AP3	8 February 1944	20 April 1944	16 May 1944	
100	SS Niantic Victory	VC2-S-AP3	12 February 1944	25 April 1944	18 May 1944	Became USNS Watertown (T-AGM-6), a Watertown-class missile range instrumentation ship.
101	SS Rockland Victory	VC2-S-AP3	28 February 1944	29 April 1944	19 May 1944	Became USS Alcor (AK-259), a Greenville Victory-class cargo ship.
102	SS Claremont Victory	VC2-S-AP3	5 March 1944	2 May 1944	23 May 1944	
103	SS Cranston Victory	VC2-S-AP3	13 March 1944	5 May 1944	25 May 1944	After WW2 became a passenger ship.
104	SS Rutland Victory	VC2-S-AP3	20 March 1944	9 May 1944	29 May 1944	13 February 1976 sank 600 miles East of Tokyo.
105	SS Elmira Victory	VC2-S-AP3	25 March 1944	12 May 1944	31 May 1944	12 January 1945 at Luzon kamikaze plane attack, damage repaired.
106	SS Marshfield Victory	VC2-S-AP3	1 April 1944	15 May 1944	7 June 1944	
107	SS Nampa Victory	VC2-S-AP3	6 April 1944	19 May 1944	10 June 1944	Became USS Antares (AK-258), Greenville Victory-class cargo ship.
108	SS Silverbow Victory	VC2-S-AP3	11 April 1944	23 May 1944	15 June 1944	
109	SS Mandan Victory	VC2-S-AP3	15 April 1944	26 May 1944	19 June 1944	
110	SS Aberdeen Victory	VC2-S-AP3	20 April 1944	30 May 1944	23 June 1944	Became USS Altair (AK-257), a Greenville Victory-class cargo ship.
111	SS Beloit Victory	VC2-S-AP3	25 April 1944	3 June 1944	7 July 1944	Named for Beloit College.
112	SS Escanaba Victory	VC2-S-AP3	29 April 1944	7 June 1944	29 June 1944	Sank off Kau I Chau Island on 17 August 1971.
113	SS Hibbing Victory	VC2-S-AP3	2 May 1944	10 June 1944	30 June 1944	Became USS Denebola (AF-56), a Denebola-class stores ship.
114	SS Joliet Victory	VC2-S-AP3	5 May 1944	14 June 1944	7 July 1944	
115	SS Quinault Victory	VC2-S-AP3	3 May 1944	17 June 1944	11 July 1944	Destroyed in the Port Chicago disaster
116	SS Skagway Victory	VC2-S-AP3	12 May 1944	21 June 1944	15 July 1944	
117	USS La Porte (APA-151)	VC2-S-AP5	15 May 1944	30 June 1944	14 August 1944	
118	USS Latimer (APA-152)	VC2-S-AP5	19 May 1944	4 July 1944	28 August 1944	
119	USS Laurens (APA-153)	VC2-S-AP5	23 May 1944	11 July 1944	6 September 1944	
120	USS Lowndes (APA-154)	VC2-S-AP5	26 May 1944	18 July 1944	14 September 1944	
121	USS Lycoming (APA-155)	VC2-S-AP5	30 May 1944	25 July 1944	20 September 1944	
122	USS Mellette (APA-156)	VC2-S-AP5	3 June 1944	4 August 1944	27 September 1944	
123	USS Napa (APA-157)	VC2-S-AP5	7 June 1944	12 August 1944	1 October 1944	
124	USS Newberry (APA-158)	VC2-S-AP5	10 June 1944	24 August 1944	6 October 1944	
125	USS Darke (APA-159)	VC2-S-AP5	14 June 1944	29 August 1944	10 October 1944	
126	USS Deuel (APA-160)	VC2-S-AP5	17 June 1944	9 September 1944	13 October 1944	
127	USS Dickens (APA-161)	VC2-S-AP5	21 June 1944	8 September 1944	18 October 1944	
128	USS Drew (APA-162)	VC2-S-AP5	30 June 1944	14 September 1944	22 October 1944	
129	USS Eastland (APA-163)	VC2-S-AP5	4 July 1944	19 September 1944	26 October 1944	
130	USS Edgecombe (APA-164)	VC2-S-AP5	11 July 1944	24 September 1944	30 October 1944	
131	USS Effingham (APA-165)	VC2-S-AP5	19 July 1944	29 September 1944	1 November 1944	
132	USS Fond du Lac (APA-166)	VC2-S-AP5	25 July 1944	5 October 1944	6 November 1944	
133	USS Freestone (APA-167)	VC2-S-AP5	4 August 1944	9 October 1944	9 November 1944	
134	USS Gage (APA-168)	VC2-S-AP5	13 August 1944	14 October 1944	12 November 1944	
135	USS Gallatin (APA-169)	VC2-S-AP5	13 August 1944	17 October 1944	15 November 1944	
136	USS Gosper (APA-170)	VC2-S-AP5	29 August 1944	20 October 1944	18 November 1944	Converted into a battle casualty ship for WW2.
137	USS Granville (APA-171)	VC2-S-AP5	4 September 1944	23 October 1944	21 November 1944	
138	USS Grimes (APA-172)	VC2-S-AP5	8 September 1944	27 October 1944	23 November 1944	
139	USS Hyde (APA-173)	VC2-S-AP5	14 September 1944	30 October 1944	25 November 1944	
140	USS Jerauld (APA-174)	VC2-S-AP5	8 September 1944	3 November 1944	28 November 1944	
141	USS Karnes (APA-175)	VC2-S-AP5	24 September 1944	7 November 1944	3 December 1944	
142	USS Kershaw (APA-176)	VC2-S-AP5	29 September 1944	12 November 1944	30 November 1944	
143	USS Kingsbury (APA-177)	VC2-S-AP5	5 October 1944	16 November 1944	5 December 1944	
144	USS Lander (APA-178)	VC2-S-AP5	9 October 1944	19 November 1944	9 December 1944	
145	USS Lauderdale (APA-179)	VC2-S-AP5	14 October 1944	23 November 1944	12 December 1944	
146	USS Lavaca (APA-180)	VC2-S-AP5	17 October 1944	27 November 1944	17 December 1944	
147	SS Longview Victory	VC2-S-AP3	20 October 1944	30 November 1944	5 January 1945	
148	SS Lewiston Victory	VC2-S-AP3	23 October 1944	2 December 1944	29 January 1945	
149	SS Minot Victory	VC2-S-AP3	27 October 1944	4 December 1944	1 February 1945	Ran aground on Paracel Islands, Vietnam, repaired.
150	SS Pierre Victory	VC2-S-AP3	30 October 1944	6 December 1944	5 February 1945	Became the SS Columbia Eagle incident, modern mutiny.
151	SS Bozeman Victory	VC2-S-AP3	3 November 1944	9 December 1944	17 February 1945	28 April 1945 a Japanese assault boat causes extensive damage, six crew members were injured, ship was repaired.
152	SS Saginaw Victory	VC2-S-AP3	7 November 1944	12 December 1944	9 February 1945	
153	SS Coeur d'Alene Victory	VC2-S-AP3	12 November 1944	15 December 1944	12 January 1945	
154	SS Kodiak Victory	VC2-S-AP3	16 November 1944	19 December 1944	16 January 1945	
155	SS West Lynn Victory	VC2-S-AP3	19 November 1944	22 December 1944	22 January 1945	
156	SS Loma Victory	VC2-S-AP3	23 November 1944	27 December 1944	25 January 1945	
157	SS Kelso Victory	VC2-S-AP3	27 November 1944	30 December 1944	16 February 1945	
158	SS St. Cloud Victory	VC2-S-AP3	30 November 1944	5 January 1945	19 February 1945	
159	SS Green Bay Victory	VC2-S-AP3	2 December 1944	9 January 1945	29 January 1945	
160	SS Rock Springs Victory	VC2-S-AP3	4 December 1944	12 January 1945	22 February 1945	
161	SS La Grande Victory	VC2-S-AP3	6 December 1944	16 January 1945	28 February 1945	
162	SS Appleton Victory	VC2-S-AP3	9 December 1944	19 January 1945	23 March 1945	Became USNS Private John R. Towle (T-AK-240), a Greenville Victory-class cargo ship.
163	SS Ames Victory	VC2-S-AP3	12 December 1944	23 January 1945	24 February 1945	
164	SS Adrian Victory	VC2-S-AP3	15 December 1944	26 January 1945	3 March 1945	
165	SS Jefferson City Victory	VC2-S-AP3	19 December 1944	30 January 1945	8 March 1945	
166	SS Terre Haute Victory	VC2-S-AP3	22 December 1944	2 February 1945	10 March 1945	
167	SS Twin Falls Victory	VC2-S-AP3	27 December 1944	6 February 1945	4 April 1945	Became USNS Twin Falls (T-AGM-11), Missile range instrumentation ship.
168	SS Paducah Victory	VC2-S-AP3	30 December 1944	9 February 1945	14 March 1945	
169	SS Dartmouth Victory	VC2-S-AP3	5 January 1945	15 February 1945	17 March 1945	Named for Dartmouth College.
170	SS Colgate Victory	VC2-S-AP3	9 January 1945	20 February 1945	21 March 1945	Named for Colgate University.
171	SS Brown Victory	VC2-S-AP3	12 January 1945	23 February 1945	27 March 1945	Named for Brown University. Kamikaze attack On 28 May 1945, Two US Navy Armed Guards are killed, ship repaired.
172	SS Davidson Victory	VC2-S-AP3	16 January 1945	27 February 1945	30 March 1945	Named for Davidson College.
173	SS Northwestern Victory	VC2-S-AP3	19 January 1945	2 March 1945	2 April 1945	Named for Northwestern University.
174	SS Furman Victory	VC2-S-AP3	23 January 1945	6 March 1945	19 April 1945	
175	SS Notre Dame Victory	VC2-S-AP3	26 January 1945	9 March 1945	6 April 1945	Named for University of Notre Dame.
176	SS Westminster Victory	VC2-S-AP3	30 January 1945	13 March 1945	11 April 1945	With Pomona Victory converted & transferred to Compaguie Maritime Belge SA Antwerp for service between Belgian Congo and Antwerp. Title transferred 5 March 1947.
177	SS Wellesley Victory	VC2-S-AP3	2 February 1945	16 March 1945	13 April 1945	Named after Wellesley College.
178	SS Creighton Victory	VC2-S-AP3	6 February 1945	21 March 1945	17 April 1945	Named for Creighton College.
179	SS Temple Victory	VC2-S-AP3	9 February 1945	27 March 1945	2 May 1945	Named for Temple University.
180	SS Willamette Victory	VC2-S-AP3	15 February 1945	30 March 1945	25 April 1945	Named for Willamette College.
181	SS Reed Victory	VC2-S-AP3	20 February 1945	3 April 1945	28 April 1945	Named for Reed College.
182	SS Simmons Victory	VC2-S-AP3	23 February 1945	6 April 1945	4 May 1945	Named for Simmons College. Became USS Liberty (AGTR-5), a technical research ship (i.e. a spy ship) that was attacked by Israel in 1967.
183	SS Capital Victory	VC2-S-AP3	27 February 1945	10 April 1945	8 May 1945	Became USNS Phoenix (T-AG-172), a Phoenix-class miscellaneous auxiliary ship.
184	SS Knox Victory	VC2-S-AP3	2 March 1945	13 April 1945	11 May 1945	Became USNS Huntsville (T-AGM-7), Watertown-class missile range instrumentation ship.
185	SS Lawrence Victory	VC2-S-AP3	6 March 1945	17 April 1945	15 May 1945	
186	SS Western Reserve Victory	VC2-S-AP3	9 March 1945	20 April 1945	18 May 1945	Named for Case Western Reserve University.
187	SS Whitman Victory	VC2-S-AP3	13 March 1945	24 April 1945	26 May 1945	Named for Whitman College.
188	SS Macalester Victory	VC2-S-AP3	16 March 1945	28 April 1945	29 May 1945	Named for Macalester College.
189	SS Coe Victory	VC2-S-AP3	21 March 1945	3 May 1945	2 June 1945	Named for Coe College.
525	SS Australia Victory	VC2-S-AP3	17 January 1944	29 April 1944	28 June 1944	
526	SS Ethiopia Victory	VC2-S-AP3	20 January 1944	20 April 1944	17 July 1944	
527	SS India Victory	VC2-S-AP3	4 March 1944	15 May 1944	29 July 1944	
528	SS Iraq Victory	VC2-S-AP3	14 March 1944	6 June 1944	8 August 1944	
529	SS Costa Rica Victory	VC2-S-AP3	22 March 1944	17 June 1944	21 August 1944	Became Groote Beer, a passenger ship.
530	SS Cuba Victory	VC2-S-AP3	31 March 1944	27 June 1944	19 August 1944	
531	SS Honduras Victory	VC2-S-AP3	6 April 1944	7 July 1944	26 August 1944	
532	SS Haiti Victory	VC2-S-AP3	24 April 1944	20 July 1944	18 September 1944	Became USNS Haiti Victory (T-AK-238), Greenville Victory-class cargo ship.
533	SS Guatemala Victory	VC2-S-AP3	1 May 1944	13 July 1944	6 September 1944	
534	SS Nicaragua Victory	VC2-S-AP3	16 May 1944	10 August 1944	23 September 1944	
535	SS Legion Victory	VC2-S-AP2	7 June 1944	21 August 1944	30 September 1944	
536	SS Boulder Victory	VC2-S-AP2	18 June 1944	31 August 1944	12 October 1944	Became USS Boulder Victory (AK-227), lead ship in class of Boulder Victory-class cargo ship.
537	SS Provo Victory	VC2-S-AP2	28 June 1944	9 September 1944	18 October 1944	Became USS Provo Victory (AK-228), Boulder Victory-class cargo ship.
538	SS Las Vegas Victory	VC2-S-AP2	7 July 1944	16 September 1944	25 October 1944	Became USS Las Vegas Victory (AK-229), Boulder Victory-class cargo ship.
539	SS Manderson Victory	VC2-S-AP2	4 July 1944	23 September 1944	3 November 1944	Became USS Manderson Victory (AK-230), Boulder Victory-class cargo ship.
540	SS Bedford Victory	VC2-S-AP2	20 July 1944	13 September 1944	11 November 1944	Became USS Bedford Victory (AK-231), Boulder Victory-class cargo ship.
541	SS Mayfield Victory	VC2-S-AP2	10 August 1944	10 October 1944	16 November 1944	Became USS Mayfield Victory (AK-232), Boulder Victory-class cargo ship.
542	SS Newcastle Victory	VC2-S-AP2	21 August 1944	17 October 1944	23 November 1944	Became USS Newcastle Victory (AK-233), Boulder Victory-class cargo ship.
543	SS Bucyrus Victory	VC2-S-AP2	1 September 1944	31 October 1944	29 November 1944	Became USS Bucyrus Victory (AK-234), Boulder Victory-class cargo ship.
544	SS Red Oak Victory	VC2-S-AP2	9 September 1944	9 November 1944	5 December 1944	Became USS Red Oak Victory (AK-235), Boulder Victory-class cargo ship, now Museum ship
545	SS Lakewood Victory	VC2-S-AP2	16 September 1944	17 November 1944	11 December 1944	Became USS Lakewood Victory (AK-236), Boulder Victory-class cargo ship.
546	SS Salina Victory	VC2-S-AP2	23 September 1944	24 November 1944	16 December 1944	
547	SS Hastings Victory	VC2-S-AP2	30 September 1944	30 November 1944	22 December 1944	Became USNS Sgt. Truman Kimbro (T-AK-254), Boulder Victory-class cargo ship.
548	SS Elko Victory	VC2-S-AP2	11 October 1944	8 December 1944	29 December 1944	
549	SS Durango Victory	VC2-S-AP2	17 October 1944	16 December 1944	5 January 1945	
550	SS Devils Lake Victory	VC2-S-AP2	31 October 1944	22 December 1944	13 January 1945	
551	SS Berkeley Victory	VC2-S-AP2	9 November 1944	31 December 1944	January 1944	
552	USS Sarasota (APA-204)	VC2-S-AP5	11 April 1944	14 June 1944	16 August 1944	
553	USS Sherburne (APA-205)	VC2-S-AP5	18 May 1944	10 July 1944	20 September 1944	
554	USS Sibley (APA-206)	VC2-S-AP5	17 May 1944	19 July 1944	2 October 1944	
555	USS Mifflin (APA-207)	VC2-S-AP5	15 May 1944	7 August 1944	11 October 1944	
556	USS Talladega (APA-208)	VC2-S-AP5	3 June 1944	17 August 1944	31 October 1944	
557	USS Tazewell (APA-209)	VC2-S-AP5	2 June 1944	22 August 1944	25 October 1944	
558	USS Telfair (APA-210)	VC2-S-AP5	30 May 1944	30 August 1944	31 October 1944	On 2 April 1945 hit by kamikaze attacked, repaired.
559	USS Missoula (APA-211)	VC2-S-AP5	20 June 1944	6 September 1944	27 October 1944	
560	USS Montrose (APA-212)	VC2-S-AP5	17 June 1944	13 September 1944	2 November 1944	
561	USS Mountrail (APA-213)	VC2-S-AP5	24 June 1944	20 September 1944	16 November 1944	
562	USS Natrona (APA-214)	VC2-S-AP5	30 June 1944	27 September 1944	8 November 1944	
563	USS Navarro (APA-215)	VC2-S-AP5	27 June 1944	3 October 1944	15 November 1944	
564	USS Neshoba (APA-216)	VC2-S-AP5	3 July 1944	7 October 1944	16 November 1944	
565	USS New Kent (APA-217)	VC2-S-AP5	11 July 1944	12 October 1944	22 November 1944	
566	USS Noble (APA-218)	VC2-S-AP5	20 July 1944	18 October 1944	27 November 1944	
567	USS Okaloosa (APA-219)	VC2-S-AP5	6 August 1944	22 October 1944	28 November 1944	
568	USS Okanogan (APA-220)	VC2-S-AP5	10 August 1944	26 October 1944	30 November 1944	
569	USS Oneida (APA-221)	VC2-S-AP5	30 September 1944	31 October 1944	4 December 1944	
570	USS Pickaway (APA-222)	VC2-S-AP5	1 September 1944	5 November 1944	12 December 1944	
571	USS Pitt (APA-223)	VC2-S-AP5	8 September 1944	10 November 1944	11 December 1944	
572	USS Randall (APA-224)	VC2-S-AP5	15 September 1944	15 November 1944	16 December 1944	
573	USS Bingham (APA-225)	VC2-S-AP5	20 September 1944	20 November 1944	23 December 1944	
574	SS Anchorage Victory	VC2-S-AP2	28 September 1944	28 November 1944	6 January 1945	
575	SS Colorado Springs Victory	VC2-S-AP2	4 October 1944	2 December 1944	10 January 1945	
576	SS Muncie Victory	VC2-S-AP2	9 October 1944	7 December 1944	14 January 1945	
577	SS Elgin Victory	VC2-S-AP2	13 October 1944	12 December 1944	18 January 1945	
578	SS Massillon Victory	VC2-S-AP2	19 October 1944	16 December 1944	23 January 1945	
579	SS Hannibal Victory	VC2-S-AP2	23 October 1944	21 December 1944	25 January 1945	
580	SS Beatrice Victory	VC2-S-AP2	27 October 1944	27 December 1944	28 January 1945	
581	SS Halaula Victory	VC2-S-AP2	17 November 1944	9 January 1945	29 January 1945	
582	SS Logan Victory	VC2-S-AP2	25 November 1944	16 January 1945	6 February 1945	Sank in battle 6 April 1945, 15 crew killed.
583	SS Clearwater Victory	VC2-S-AP2	1 December 1944	20 January 1945	16 February 1945	
584	SS Anniston Victory	VC2-S-AP2	8 December 1944	26 January 1945	21 February 1945	
585	SS Moline Victory	VC2-S-AP2	16 December 1944	31 January 1945	28 February 1945	
586	SS Medina Victory	VC2-S-AP2	22 December 1944	10 February 1945	7 March 1945	Named for Medina, Ohio
587	SS Princeton Victory	VC2-S-AP2	31 December 1944	19 February 1945	14 March 1945	Named for Princeton University.
588	SS Bowdoin Victory	VC2-S-AP2	9 January 1945	24 February 1945	20 March 1945	Named for Bowdoin College.
589	SS Wesleyan Victory	VC2-S-AP2	16 January 1945	28 February 1945	29 March 1945	Named for Wesleyan University.
590	SS Xavier Victory	VC2-S-AP2	21 January 1945	7 March 1945	31 March 1945	
591	SS Mercer Victory	VC2-S-AP2	26 January 1945	14 March 1945	11 April 1945	Named after Mercer University
592	SS Oberlin Victory	VC2-S-AP2	31 January 1945	21 March 1945	20 April 1945	Named for Oberlin College.
593	SS Tulane Victory	VC2-S-AP2	10 February 1945	28 March 1945	28 April 1945	Named for Tulane University.
594	SS Wake Forest Victory	VC2-S-AP2	28 February 1945	31 March 1945	10 May 1945	Named for Wake Forest University.
595	SS Denison Victory	VC2-S-AP2	8 March 1945	11 April 1945	19 May 1945	Named for Denison University.
596	SS St. John's Victory	VC2-S-AP2	14 March 1945	19 April 1945	30 May 1945	Named after St. John's College (Annapolis).
597	SS Virginia City Victory	VC2-S-AP2	31 October 1944	31 December 1944	31 January 1945	
598	SS Brigham Victory	VC2-S-AP2	6 November 1944	4 January 1945	31 January 1945	Named after Brigham City, Utah
599	SS Hobbs Victory	VC2-S-AP2	10 November 1944	9 January 1945	5 February 1945	Sank after Kamikaze attack on 6 April 1945, Kerama Islands, Okinawa, 12 crew killed.
600	SS El Reno Victory	VC2-S-AP2	15 November 1944	13 January 1945	7 February 1945	
601	SS Lahaina Victory	VC2-S-AP2	20 November 1944	18 January 1945	10 February 1945	
602	SS Frederick Victory	VC2-S-AP2	22 June 1944	9 September 1944	6 October 1944	
603	SS Madawaska Victory	VC2-S-AP2	29 June 1944	16 September 1944	20 October 1944	
604	SS Woodstock Victory	VC2-S-AP2	10 July 1944	23 September 1944	27 October 1944	
605	SS St. Albans Victory	VC2-S-AP2	20 July 1944	5 October 1944	9 November 1944	
606	SS Pachaug Victory	VC2-S-AP2	8 August 1944	13 October 1944	16 November 1944	
607	SS Malden Victory	VC2-S-AP2	16 August 1944	22 October 1944	22 November 1944	
608	SS Westerly Victory	VC2-S-AP2	9 September 1944	31 October 1944	28 November 1944	Sold to Safmarine in 1947 and named Morgenster. Renamed South African Venture in 1961. Renamed S A Venture in 1966. Sold to International Export Lines and named Hong Kong Weaver in 1969. Scrapped in Taiwan in 1972.
609	SS Oneida Victory	VC2-S-AP2	16 September 1944	4 November 1944	30 November 1944	
610	SS Montclair Victory	VC2-S-AP2	22 September 1944	16 November 1944	13 December 1944	
611	SS Towanda Victory	VC2-S-AP2	23 September 1944	11 November 1944	7 December 1944	
612	SS Claymont Victory	VC2-S-AP2	25 September 1944	18 November 1944	15 December 1944	
613	SS Blue Ridge Victory	VC2-S-AP2	30 September 1944	20 November 1944	21 December 1944	
614	SS Fairmont Victory	VC2-S-AP2	5 October 1944	25 November 1944	27 December 1944	
615	SS Chapel Hill Victory	VC2-S-AP2	9 October 1944	4 December 1944	31 December 1944	
616	SS Aiken Victory	VC2-S-AP2	13 October 1944	30 November 1944	30 December 1944	
617	SS Valdosta Victory	VC2-S-AP2	19 October 1944	11 December 1944	15 January 1945	
618	SS Eufaula Victory	VC2-S-AP2	23 October 1944	5 December 1944	31 December 1944	
619	SS Ocala Victory	VC2-S-AP2	24 October 1944	19 December 1944	22 January 1945	
620	SS Kokomo Victory	VC2-S-AP2	28 October 1944	18 December 1944	20 January 1945	
621	SS Blue Island Victory	VC2-S-AP2	31 October 1944	28 December 1944	30 January 1945	
622	SS Frostburg Victory	VC2-S-AP2	3 November 1944	20 January 1945	19 February 1945	
623	SS La Crosse Victory	VC2-S-AP2	4 November 1944	22 December 1944	29 January 1945	
624	SS Albion Victory	VC2-S-AP2	11 November 1944	5 January 1945	31 January 1945	
625	SS Frontenac Victory	VC2-S-AP2	16 November 1944	18 January 1945	14 February 1945	1 March 1945, collided with tanker in the Atlantic, repaired.
626	SS Zanesville Victory	VC2-S-AP2	18 November 1944	15 January 1945	12 February 1945	
627	SS Sedalia Victory	VC2-S-AP2	20 November 1944	11 January 1945	1 February 1945	
628	SS Pontotoc Victory	VC2-S-AP2	25 November 1944	26 January 1945	21 February 1945	
629	SS Clarksville Victory	VC2-S-AP2	30 November 1944	30 January 1945	26 February 1945	
630	SS Bardstown Victory	VC2-S-AP2	4 December 1944	15 February 1945	16 March 1945	Christened with bourbon in Maryland from Bardstown, KY.
631	SS Lake Charles Victory	VC2-S-AP2	5 December 1944	1 February 1945	28 February 1945	
632	SS Morgantown Victory	VC2-S-AP2	12 December 1944	5 February 1945	28 February 1945	11 April 1945 hit mine north of Le Havre, France, repaired.
633	SS Pittston Victory	VC2-S-AP2	18 December 1944	10 February 1945	10 March 1945	
634	SS Hagerstown Victory	VC2-S-AP2	19 December 1944	13 February 1945	13 March 1945	Sank in off the coast of Luzon in Typhoon Patsy, 9 crewmen lost at sea.
635	SS Milford Victory	VC2-S-AP2	22 December 1944	19 February 1945	20 March 1945	
636	SS Coaldale Victory	VC2-S-AP2	28 December 1944	23 February 1945	23 March 1945	
637	SS Mahanoy City Victory	VC2-S-AP2	5 January 1945	24 February 1945	26 March 1945	
638	SS Kingston Victory	VC2-S-AP2	11 January 1945	3 March 1945	27 March 1945	
639	SS New Bern Victory	VC2-S-AP2	15 January 1945	8 March 1945	31 March 1945	Sold to Safmarine in 1947 and named Constantia. Renamed South African Vanguard in 1961. Renamed S A Vanguard in 1966. Sold to Fairwind Maritime Corp. in 1969 and named Isabena. Sank on 4 July 1972 in heavy weather off Karachi.
640	SS Winchester Victory	VC2-S-AP2	18 January 1945	6 March 1945	30 March 1945	
641	SS Stamford Victory	VC2-S-AP2	20 January 1945	12 March 1945	7 April 1945	
642	SS Attleboro Victory	VC2-S-AP2	26 January 1945	16 March 1945	10 April 1945	14 June 1945 hit a mine in the Black Sea, repaired.
643	SS Laconia Victory	VC2-S-AP2	30 January 1945	19 March 1945	13 April 1945	
644	SS Central Falls Victory	VC2-S-AP2	1 February 1945	23 March 1945	17 April 1945	
645	SS East Point Victory	VC2-S-AP2	5 February 1945	26 March 1945	20 April 1945	
646	SS Woodbridge Victory	VC2-S-AP2	10 February 1945	29 March 1945	24 April 1945	
647	SS Rock Hill Victory	VC2-S-AP2	15 February 1945	6 April 1945	2 May 1945	
648	SS Fayetteville Victory	VC2-S-AP2	19 February 1945	12 April 1945	8 May 1945	
649	SS Westbrook Victory	VC2-S-AP2	23 February 1945	17 April 1945	12 May 1945	Sold to Safmarine in 1947 and named Vergelenen. Renamed South African Victory in 1961. Renamed S A Victory in 1966. Scrapped in Taiwan in 1969.
650	SS Brandon Victory	VC2-S-AP2	24 February 1945	10 April 1945	9 May 1945	
651	SS Rushville Victory	VC2-S-AP2	3 March 1945	24 April 1945	22 May 1945	On 11 February 1958 collision and sank in the Schelde River.
652	SS William and Mary Victory	VC2-S-AP2	6 March 1945	20 April 1945	15 May 1945	Named for the College of William and Mary.
653	SS Georgetown Victory	VC2-S-AP2	8 March 1945	28 April 1945	22 May 1945	Named for Georgetown University. Sank 30 April 1946 off Ireland.
654	MV Emory Victory	VC2-M-AP4	13 February 1945	3 April 1945	6 October 1945	Named for Emory University. The only Diesel Victory ship. Later used in the Alaska Resupply Program.
655	USS Oconto (APA-187)	VC2-S-AP5	5 April 1944	20 June 1944	2 September 1944	
656	USS Olmstead (APA-188)	VC2-S-AP5	11 April 1944	4 July 1944	5 September 1944	
657	USS Oxford (APA-189)	VC2-S-AP5	17 April 1944	12 July 1944	11 September 1944	
658	USS Pickens (APA-190)	VC2-S-AP5	22 April 1944	21 July 1944	18 September 1944	
659	USS Pondera (APA-191)	VC2-S-AP5	28 April 1944	27 July 1944	24 September 1944	
660	USS Rutland (APA-192)	VC2-S-AP5	4 May 1944	10 August 1944	29 September 1944	
661	USS Sanborn (APA-193)	VC2-S-AP5	10 March 1944	19 August 1944	3 October 1944	
662	USS Sandoval (APA-194)	VC2-S-AP5	16 May 1944	2 September 1944	7 October 1944	
663	USS Lenawee (APA-195)	VC2-S-AP5	26 May 1944	11 September 1944	11 October 1944	
664	USS Logan (APA-196)	VC2-S-AP5	27 May 1944	19 September 1944	14 October 1944	
665	USS Lubbock (APA-197)	VC2-S-AP5	2 June 1944	25 September 1944	18 October 1944	
666	USS McCracken (APA-198)	VC2-S-AP5	8 June 1944	29 September 1944	21 October 1944	
667	USS Magoffin (APA-199)	VC2-S-AP5	20 June 1944	4 October 1944	25 October 1944	
668	USS Marathon (APA-200)	VC2-S-AP5	4 July 1944	7 October 1944	27 October 1944	
669	USS Menard (APA-201)	VC2-S-AP5	12 July 1944	11 October 1944	31 October 1944	
670	USS Menifee (APA-202)	VC2-S-AP5	21 July 1944	15 October 1944	4 November 1944	
671	USS Meriwether (APA-203)	VC2-S-AP5	27 July 1944	18 October 1944	7 November 1944	
672	USS Rawlins (APA-226)	VC2-S-AP5	10 August 1944	21 October 1944	10 November 1944	
673	USS Renville (APA-227)	VC2-S-AP5	19 August 1944	25 October 1944	15 November 1944	
674	USS Rockbridge (APA-228)	VC2-S-AP5	2 September 1944	28 October 1944	18 November 1944	
675	USS Rockingham (APA-229)	VC2-S-AP5	11 September 1944	1 November 1944	22 November 1944	
676	USS Rockwall (APA-230)	VC2-S-AP5	9 September 1944	5 November 1944	26 November 1944	
677	USS Saint Croix (APA-231)	VC2-S-AP5	25 September 1944	9 November 1944	1 December 1944	
678	USS San Saba (APA-232)	VC2-S-AP5	29 September 1944	12 November 1944	3 December 1944	
679	USS Sevier (APA-233)	VC2-S-AP5	4 October 1944	16 November 1944	5 December 1944	
680	USS Bollinger (APA-234)	VC2-S-AP5	7 October 1944	19 November 1944	9 December 1944	
681	USS Bottineau (APA-235)	VC2-S-AP5	11 October 1944	22 November 1944	30 December 1944	
682	SS Tuskegee Victory	VC2-S-AP3	27 March 1945	8 May 1945	5 June 1945	Named for Tuskegee University.
683	SS Union Victory	VC2-S-AP3	30 March 1945	11 May 1945	8 June 1945	Named for Union College.
684	SS Clark Victory	VC2-S-AP3	3 April 1945	15 May 1945	12 June 1945	
685	SS Skidmore Victory	VC2-S-AP3	6 April 1945	19 May 1945	18 June 1945	Named for Skidmore College.
686	SS Seton Hall Victory	VC2-S-AP3	10 April 1945	22 May 1945	21 June 1945	Named for Seton Hall University.
687	SS Oglethorpe Victory	VC2-S-AP3	13 April 1945	29 May 1945	23 June 1945	Named for Oglethorpe University.
688	SS Gonzaga Victory	VC2-S-AP3	17 April 1945	2 June 1945	29 June 1945	Named for Gonzaga University.
689	SS Linfield Victory	VC2-S-AP3	20 April 1945	7 June 1945	3 July 1945	
690	SS Midland Victory	VC2-S-AP3	24 April 1945	12 June 1945	11 July 1945	
691	SS Drew Victory	VC2-S-AP3	28 April 1945	17 June 1945	14 July 1945	Named for Drew University.
692	SS Alma Victory	VC2-S-AP3	3 May 1945	21 June 1945	20 July 1945	Named for Alma College.
693	SS Middlesex Victory	VC2-S-AP3	8 May 1945	26 June 1945	24 July 1945	
694	SS South Bend Victory	VC2-S-AP3	11 May 1945	30 June 1945	27 July 1945	Became USNS Bowditch (T-AGS-21).
695	SS Coffeyville Victory	VC2-S-AP3	15 May 1945	5 July 1945	31 July 1945	
696	SS Norwalk Victory	VC2-S-AP5	19 May 1945	10 July 1945	7 August 1945	
697	SS Chelsea Victory	VC2-S-AP3	29 May 1945	19 July 1945	14 August 1945	
698	SS Binghamton Victory	VC2-S-AP3	7 June 1945	28 July 1945	27 August 1945	
699	SS Jackson Victory	VC2-S-AP3	12 June 1945	2 August 1945	15 October 1945	
700	SS Dothan Victory	VC2-S-AP3	21 June 1945	11 August 1945	7 November 1945	
701	SS Bellingham Victory	VC2-S-AP3	26 June 1945	18 August 1945	24 September 1945	
702	SS MacMurray Victory	VC2-S-AP2	22 March 1945	28 April 1945	30 June 1945	
703	SS Northeastern Victory	VC2-S-AP2	28 March 1945	7 May 1945	30 June 1945	Named for Northeastern University. Sank 24 December 1946 on Goodwin Sands.
704	SS Fenn Victory	VC2-S-AP2	11 April 1945	15 May 1945	13 July 1945	
705	SS Hobart Victory	VC2-S-AP2	20 April 1945	25 May 1945	24 July 1945	Named for Hobart College in Geneva, New York.
706	SS Catawba Victory	VC2-S-AP2	30 April 1945	6 June 1945	17 July 1945	
707	SS Hamilton Victory	VC2-S-AP2	8 May 1945	15 June 1945	6 August 1945	Named for Hamilton College.
708	SS Hillsdale Victory	VC2-S-AP2	16 May 1945	23 June 1945	4 August 1945	Named for Hillsdale College.
709	SS Ripon Victory	VC2-S-AP2	25 May 1945	3 July 1945	21 August 1945	
710	SS Carthage Victory	VC2-S-AP2	7 June 1945	14 July 1945	30 August 1945	
711	SS Newberry Victory	VC2-S-AP2	16 June 1945	19 July 1945	13 September 1945	
712	SS Enid Victory	VC2-S-AP2	17 May 1945	27 June 1945	28 July 1945	
713	SS San Mateo Victory	VC2-S-AP2	19 May 1945	30 June 1945	4 August 1945	
714	SS Greeley Victory	VC2-S-AP2	24 May 1945	4 July 1945	8 August 1945	
715	SS Berwyn Victory	VC2-S-AP2	27 May 1945	7 July 1945	13 August 1945	
716	SS Battle Creek Victory	VC2-S-AP2	31 May 1945	11 July 1945	17 August 1945	
717	SS Great Falls Victory	VC2-S-AP2	4 June 1945	14 July 1945	20 August 1945	
718	SS Lakeland Victory	VC2-S-AP2	8 June 1945	18 July 1945	25 August 1945	
719	SS Owensboro Victory	VC2-S-AP2	12 June 1945	21 July 1945	27 August 1945	Became USNS Private Joe E. Mann (T-AK-253), Boulder Victory-class cargo ship.
720	SS Waltham Victory	VC2-S-AP2	14 June 1945	25 July 1945	30 August 1945	
721	SS Burbank Victory	VC2-S-AP2	18 June 1945	28 July 1945	15 September 1945	
722	SS Gretna Victory	VC2-S-AP2	28 November 1944	20 January 1945	14 February 1945	
723	SS Laredo Victory	VC2-S-AP2	2 December 1944	24 January 1945	17 February 1945	
724	SS Harvard Victory	VC2-S-AP2	7 December 1944	27 January 1945	21 February 1945	Named for Harvard University.
725	SS Yale Victory	VC2-S-AP2	13 December 1944	31 January 1945	24 February 1945	Named for Yale University.
726	SS Middlebury Victory	VC2-S-AP2	16 December 1944	3 February 1945	1 March 1945	Named for Middlebury College. Sank 1947 in the Mediterranean Sea.
727	SS De Pauw Victory	VC2-S-AP2	22 December 1944	7 February 1945	3 March 1945	Named for De Pauw University.
728	SS Bucknell Victory	VC2-S-AP2	27 December 1944	10 February 1945	7 March 1945	Named for Bucknell University. 9 May 1945 Kamikaze attacked, damage repaired.
729	SS Grinnell Victory	VC2-S-AP2	31 December 1944	14 February 1945	10 March 1945	Named for Grinnell College.
730	SS Mount Holyoke Victory	VC2-S-AP2	5 January 1945	17 February 1945	14 March 1945	Named for Mount Holyoke College.
731	SS Duke Victory	VC2-S-AP2	9 January 1945	21 February 1945	17 March 1945	Named for Duke University.
732	SS Fordham Victory	VC2-S-AP2	13 January 1945	24 February 1945	21 March 1945	Named for Fordham University.
733	SS Citadel Victory	VC2-S-AP2	18 January 1945	28 February 1945	24 March 1945	
734	SS Berea Victory	VC2-S-AP2	20 January 1945	3 March 1945	28 March 1945	
735	SS St. Lawrence Victory	VC2-S-AP2	25 January 1945	7 March 1945	31 March 1945	Named for St. Lawrence University.In 1961 had collision with a tanker 200 miles off New York, repaired.
736	SS Central Victory	VC2-S-AP2	27 January 1945	10 March 1945	4 April 1945	
737	SS Swarthmore Victory	VC2-S-AP2	31 January 1945	14 March 1945	7 April 1945	Named for Swarthmore College.
738	SS Carleton Victory	VC2-S-AP2	3 February 1945	17 March 1945	11 April 1945	Named for Carleton College.
739	SS Loyola Victory	VC2-S-AP2	8 February 1945	21 March 1945	14 April 1945	
740	SS Purdue Victory	VC2-S-AP2	11 February 1945	24 March 1945	18 April 1945	
741	SS Mills Victory	VC2-S-AP2	14 February 1945	28 March 1945	21 April 1945	
742	SS Barnard Victory	VC2-S-AP2	17 February 1945	31 March 1945	25 April 1945	Named for Barnard College.
743	SS Radcliffe Victory	VC2-S-AP2	22 February 1945	4 April 1945	28 April 1945	Named for Radcliffe College.
744	SS Drexel Victory	VC2-S-AP2	25 February 1945	7 April 1945	2 May 1945	Named for the Drexel Institute of Technology. Sank on the Columbia Bar on 20 Jan. 1947.
745	SS Alfred Victory	VC2-S-AP2	28 February 1945	11 April 1945	7 May 1945	
746	SS Pan American Victory	VC2-S-AP2	3 March 1945	14 April 1945	9 May 1945	
747	SS Trinity Victory	VC2-S-AP2	8 March 1945	18 April 1945	12 May 1945	Named for Trinity College (Hartford).
748	SS Park Victory	VC2-S-AP2	11 March 1945	21 April 1945	16 May 1945	Sank in the Gulf of Finland on 25 December 1947.
749	SS Fisk Victory	VC2-S-AP2	14 March 1945	25 April 1945	19 May 1945	Named for Fisk University.
750	SS Grove City Victory	VC2-S-AP2	17 March 1945	28 April 1945	23 May 1945	Named after Grove City College
751	SS Hope Victory	VC2-S-AP2	22 March 1945	2 May 1945	26 May 1945	
752	SS Lafayette Victory	VC2-S-AP2	25 March 1945	5 May 1945	30 May 1945	Named for Lafayette College
753	SS Marquette Victory	VC2-S-AP2	29 March 1945	9 May 1945	2 June 1945	
754	SS Hunter Victory	VC2-S-AP2	31 March 1945	12 May 1945	6 June 1945	
755	SS Augustana Victory	VC2-S-AP2	5 April 1945	16 May 1945	9 June 1945	
756	SS Berry Victory	VC2-S-AP2	8 April 1945	19 May 1945	13 June 1945	
757	SS Drake Victory	VC2-S-AP2	12 April 1945	23 May 1945	16 June 1945	
758	SS Phillips Victory	VC2-S-AP2	14 April 1945	26 May 1945	20 June 1945	
759	SS New World Victory	VC2-S-AP2	18 April 1945	30 May 1945	23 June 1945	
760	SS Adelphi Victory	VC2-S-AP2	22 April 1945	2 June 1945	27 June 1945	
761	SS Drury Victory	VC2-S-AP2	26 April 1945	6 June 1945	3 July 1945	
762	SS Allegheny Victory	VC2-S-AP2	28 April 1945	9 June 1945	6 July 1945	
763	SS Earlham Victory	VC2-S-AP2	3 May 1945	13 June 1945	10 July 1945	
764	SS Asbury Victory	VC2-S-AP2	6 May 1945	16 June 1945	18 July 1945	
765	SS Canton Victory	VC2-S-AP2	10 May 1945	20 June 1945	21 July 1945	
766	SS Lindenwood Victory	VC2-S-AP2	12 May 1945	23 June 1945	25 July 1945	Named for Lindenwood University. Became USNS Clemson (T-AG-184).
767	SS Rensselaer Victory	VC2-S-AP2	22 December 1944	16 February 1945	15 March 1945	Named for Rensselaer Polytechnic Institute
768	SS Maryville Victory	VC2-S-AP2	28 December 1944	22 February 1945	19 March 1945	Named for Maryville College (Tennessee).
769	SS Norwich Victory	VC2-S-AP2	29 December 1944	24 February 1945	22 March 1945	Ran aground and damaged in Da Nang in 1969 then scrapped, Naned for Norwich University
770	SS Amherst Victory	VC2-S-AP2	9 January 1945	28 February 1945	26 March 1945	Named for Amherst College.
771	SS Tufts Victory	VC2-S-AP2	11 January 1945	2 March 1945	28 March 1945	Named for Tufts College.
772	SS Baylor Victory	VC2-S-AP2	13 January 1945	6 March 1945	30 March 1945	Named for Baylor University.
773	SS Santa Clara Victory	VC2-S-AP2	16 January 1945	9 March 1945	3 April 1945	
774	SS Beaver Victory	VC2-S-AP2	19 January 1945	14 March 1945	7 April 1945	
775	SS Lehigh Victory	VC2-S-AP2	24 January 1945	17 March 1945	12 April 1945	Named for Lehigh University. Renamed after Bernard J. Ray in 1947. Scrapped in Brownsville, TX in 1974.
776	SS Wheaton Victory	VC2-S-AP2	27 January 1945	22 March 1945	14 April 1945	Named for Wheaton College (Massachusetts).
777	SS Rider Victory	VC2-S-AP2	31 January 1945	26 March 1945	18 April 1945	
778	SS Cornell Victory	VC2-S-AP2	2 February 1945	30 March 1945	23 April 1945	Named for Cornell University.
779	SS Wooster Victory	VC2-S-AP2	9 February 1945	2 April 1945	25 April 1945	Named for the College of Wooster.
780	SS Calvin Victory	VC2-S-AP2	13 February 1945	5 April 1945	28 April 1945	
781	SS Vanderbilt Victory	VC2-S-AP2	16 February 1945	11 April 1945	4 May 1945	Named for Vanderbilt University.
782	SS Pratt Victory	VC2-S-AP2	22 February 1945	14 April 1945	9 May 1945	Named for the Pratt Institute. Torpedoed on 27 July 1945 near Okinawa Island, used as mine sweep, repaired.
783	SS Cooper Union Victory	VC2-S-AP2	25 February 1945	19 April 1945	12 May 1945	Named for the Cooper Union.
784	SS Occidental Victory	VC2-S-AP2	28 February 1945	23 April 1945	16 May 1945	Named for Occidental College.
785	SS Villanova Victory	VC2-S-AP2	2 March 1945	27 April 1945	19 May 1945	
786	SS Southwestern Victory	VC2-S-AP2	6 March 1945	30 April 1945	23 May 1945	
787	SS Bates Victory	VC2-S-AP2	9 March 1945	2 May 1945	26 May 1945	Named for Bates College.
788	SS Ouachita Victory	VC2-S-AP2	14 March 1945	8 May 1945	31 May 1945	
789	SS Queens Victory	VC2-S-AP2	17 March 1945	12 May 1945	7 June 1945	
790	SS Winthrop Victory	VC2-S-AP2	22 March 1945	17 May 1945	11 June 1945	
791	SS Niagara Victory	VC2-S-AP2	27 March 1945	19 May 1945	15 June 1945	
792	SS American Victory	VC2-S-AP2	30 March 1945	24 May 1945	20 June 1945	Named for American University, it is now a Museum ship.
793	SS Wayne Victory	VC2-S-AP2	3 April 1945	28 May 1945	23 June 1945	Named for Wayne State University of Detroit.
794	SS Lane Victory	VC2-S-AP2	5 April 1945	31 May 1945	27 June 1945	Named for Lane College. It is now a Museum ship.
795	SS Kenyon Victory	VC2-S-AP2	11 April 1945	5 June 1945	30 June 1945	Named for Kenyon College.
796	SS Wabash Victory	VC2-S-AP2	14 April 1945	9 June 1945	6 July 1945	Named for Wabash College. Became USNS Private Francis X. McGraw (T-AK-241), a Boulder Victory-class cargo ship.
797	SS Rice Victory	VC2-S-AP2	24 April 1945	16 June 1945	12 July 1945	Named for Rice University.
798	SS Whittier Victory	VC2-S-AP2	27 April 1945	20 June 1945	18 July 1945	
799	SS Meredith Victory	VC2-S-AP2	1 May 1945	23 June 1945	24 July 1945	Named for Meredith College. During the Korean War evacuated over 14,000 civilians in a single voyage.
800	SS Pacific Victory	VC2-S-AP2	3 May 1945	28 June 1945	28 July 1945	
801	SS Amarillo Victory	VC2-S-AP2	8 May 1945	1 July 1945	2 August 1945	
802	SS Pine Bluff Victory	VC2-S-AP2	12 May 1945	7 July 1945	8 August 1945	
803	SS Tucson Victory	VC2-S-AP2	17 May 1945	13 July 1945	17 August 1945	
804	SS Roswell Victory	VC2-S-AP2	19 May 1945	17 July 1945	25 August 1945	
805	SS Bloomington Victory	VC2-S-AP2	24 May 1945	21 July 1945	28 August 1945	
806	SS Bessemer Victory	VC2-S-AP2	28 May 1945	26 July 1945	30 August 1945	
807	SS North Platte Victory	VC2-S-AP2	1 June 1945	3 August 1945	5 September 1945	
808	SS Oshkosh Victory	VC2-S-AP2	6 June 1945	9 August 1945	10 September 1945	2 March 1946 hit mine in the Yangtze River, repaired.
809	SS Hattiesburg Victory	VC2-S-AP2	9 June 1945	14 August 1945	15 September 1945	
810	SS Trinidad Victory	VC2-S-AP2	18 June 1945	24 August 1945	21 September 1945	
811	SS Bowling Green Victory	VC2-S-AP2	21 June 1945	28 August 1945	27 September 1945	Became USNS Lt. Robert Craig (T-AK-252), Boulder Victory-class cargo ship.
812	USS Cottle (APA-147)	VC2-S-AP5	15 October 1944	26 November 1944	14 December 1944	
813	USS Crockett (APA-148)	VC2-S-AP5	18 October 1944	28 November 1944	18 January 1945	
814	USS Audubon (APA-149)	VC2-S-AP5	21 October 1944	21 October 1944	20 December 1944	
815	USS Bergen (APA-150)	VC2-S-AP5	25 October 1944	5 December 1944	23 January 1945	
816	SS Antioch Victory	VC2-S-AP2	12 March 1945	2 May 1945	25 May 1945	Named for Antioch College.
817	SS Williams Victory	VC2-S-AP2	16 March 1945	7 May 1945	30 May 1945	Named for Williams College.
818	SS Vassar Victory	VC2-S-AP2	19 March 1945	3 May 1945	28 May 1945	Named for Vassar College.
819	SS M. I. T. Victory	VC2-S-AP2	23 March 1945	12 May 1945	5 June 1945	Named for the Massachusetts Institute of Technology.
820	SS N. Y. U. Victory	VC2-S-AP2	26 March 1945	16 May 1945	12 June 1945	Named for New York University.
821	SS Maritime Victory	VC2-S-AP2	7 April 1945	22 May 1945	18 June 1945	
822	SS Howard Victory	VC2-S-AP2	29 March 1945	14 May 1945	8 June 1945	Named for Howard University.
823	SS Marshall Victory	VC2-S-AP2	4 April 1945	21 May 1945	15 June 1945	
824	SS Smith Victory	VC2-S-AP2	11 April 1945	24 May 1945	22 June 1945	Named for Smith College.
825	SS Stevens Victory	VC2-S-AP2	13 April 1945	29 May 1945	25 June 1945	Named for Stevens Institute of Technology.
826	SS Goucher Victory	VC2-S-AP2	18 April 1945	2 June 1945	30 June 1945	Named for Goucher College.
827	SS Kings Point Victory	VC2-S-AP2	21 April 1945	31 May 1945	27 June 1945	
828	SS Hood Victory	VC2-S-AP2	25 April 1945	9 June 1945	5 July 1945	
829	SS Tusculum Victory	VC2-S-AP2	30 April 1945	11 June 1945	10 July 1945	Named for Tusculum College, Greeneville, TN.
830	SS Stetson Victory	VC2-S-AP2	3 May 1945	16 June 1945	18 July 1945	
831	SS Sheepshead Bay Victory	VC2-S-AP2	4 May 1945	13 June 1945	13 July 1945	
832	SS Haverford Victory	VC2-S-AP2	8 May 1945	20 June 1945	23 July 1945	Named for Haverford College.
833	SS Webster Victory	VC2-S-AP2	14 May 1945	26 June 1945	30 July 1945	
834	SS C. C. N. Y. Victory	VC2-S-AP2	15 May 1945	23 June 1945	26 July 1945	
835	SS Rollins Victory	VC2-S-AP2	17 May 1945	2 July 1945	31 July 1945	Named for Rollins College.
836	SS Wilson Victory	VC2-S-AP2	22 May 1945	6 July 1945	6 August 1945	
837	SS Muhlenberg Victory	VC2-S-AP2	23 May 1945	12 July 1945	15 August 1945	
838	SS Gustavus Victory	VC2-S-AP2	25 May 1945	9 July 1945	10 August 1945	
839	SS Hampden-Sydney Victory	VC2-S-AP2	30 May 1945	14 July 1945	22 August 1945	Named for Hampden-Sydney College.
840	SS Waycross Victory	VC2-S-AP2	1 June 1945	20 July 1945	25 August 1945	
841	SS Altoona Victory	VC2-S-AP2	4 June 1945	24 July 1945	29 August 1945	
842	SS Waterbury Victory	VC2-S-AP2	9 June 1945	26 July 1945	31 August 1945	
843	SS Nashua Victory	VC2-S-AP2	12 June 1945	6 August 1945	10 September 1945	
844	SS Barre Victory	VC2-S-AP2	14 June 1945	31 July 1945	6 September 1945	
845	SS Spartanburg Victory	VC2-S-AP2	18 June 1945	6 August 1945	17 September 1945	
846	SS Baton Rouge Victory	VC2-S-AP2	21 June 1945	22 August 1945	24 September 1945	29 November 1946 collided in fog near Los Angeles Harbor, repaired.
847	SS Lynn Victory	VC2-S-AP2	25 June 1945	15 August 1945	20 September 1945	
848	SS Biddeford Victory	VC2-S-AP2	27 June 1945	23 August 1945	25 September 1945	
849	SS St. Augustine Victory	VC2-S-AP2	3 July 1945	7 September 1945	29 September 1945	
850	SS New Rochelle Victory	VC2-S-AP2	7 July 1945	5 September 1945	2 October 1945	
851	SS High Point Victory	VC2-S-AP2	10 July 1945	6 September 1945	28 September 1945	
852	SS Waterville Victory	VC2-S-AP2	13 July 1945	19 September 1945	15 October 1945	
853	SS Lynchburg Victory	VC2-S-AP2	16 July 1945	12 September 1945	8 October 1945	
854	SS Parkersburg Victory	VC2-S-AP2	21 July 1945	15 September 1945	11 October 1945	
855	SS Atlantic City Victory	VC2-S-AP2	25 July 1945	19 September 1945	18 October 1945	
856	SS Pass Christian Victory	VC2-S-AP2	27 July 1945	19 September 1945	18 October 1945	
860	USS Bronx (APA-236)	VC2-S-AP5	22 May 1945	14 July 1945	27 August 1945	
861	USS Bexar (APA-237)	VC2-S-AP5	2 June 1945	25 July 1945	9 October 1945	
862	USS Dane (APA-238)	VC2-S-AP5	18 June 1945	9 August 1945	29 October 1945	
863	USS Glynn (APA-239)	VC2-S-AP5	18 June 1945	9 August 1945	29 October 1945	
864	USS Harnett (APA-240)	VC2-S-AP5				Cancelled
865	USS Hempstead (APA-241)	VC2-S-AP5				Cancelled
866	SS Alcoa Corsair	VC2-S1-AP7	11 August 1945	2 October 1946	22 April 1947	ordered as USS Iredell (APA-242) but cancelled
867	USS Luzerne (APA-243)	VC2-S-AP5				Cancelled
868	USS Madeia (APA-244)	VC2-S-AP5				Cancelled
869	USS Maricopa (APA-245)	VC2-S-AP5				Cancelled
870	USS McLennan (APA-246)	VC2-S-AP5				Cancelled
871	USS Mecklenburg (APA-247)	VC2-S-AP5				Cancelled
872	SS Mankato Victory	VC2-S-AP3	5 July 1945	29 August 1945	14 November 1945	
873	SS Billings Victory	VC2-S-AP3	10 July 1945	28 September 1945	1 November 1945	
874	SS Boise Victory	VC2-S-AP3	19 July 1945	17 October 1945	19 November 1945	
875	SS Brainerd Victory	VC2-S-AP3	25 July 1945	24 October 1945	23 November 1945	Sank 1964 near Bermuda, loss of 4 crew members.
876	SS Alcoa Cavalier	VC2-S1-AP7	2 August 1945	26 August 1946	13 March 1947	
877	SS Alcoa Clipper	VC2-S1-AP7	9 August 1945	28 September 1946	8 April 1947	
885	SS Petersburg Victory	VC2-S-AP2	25 June 1945	1 September 1945	3 October 1945	
886	SS Mesa Victory	VC2-S-AP2	28 June 1945	6 September 1945	5 October 1945	
887	SS Warwick Victory	VC2-S-AP2	2 July 1945	10 September 1945	9 October 1945	
888	SS Clarksburg Victory	VC2-S-AP2	9 July 1945	15 September 1945	15 October 1945	Became USNS Clarksburg (T-AG-183)
889	SS San Angelo Victory	VC2-S-AP2	13 July 1945	20 September 1945	20 October 1945	
890	SS Council Bluffs Victory	VC2-S-AP2	18 July 1945	27 September 1945	27 October 1945	
