= SS Hampden-Sydney Victory =

American cargo ship, launched 1945

SS Hampden-Sydney Victory was a Victory ship constructed in Bethlehem Fairfield Shipyard in Baltimore, Maryland.

== Service career ==
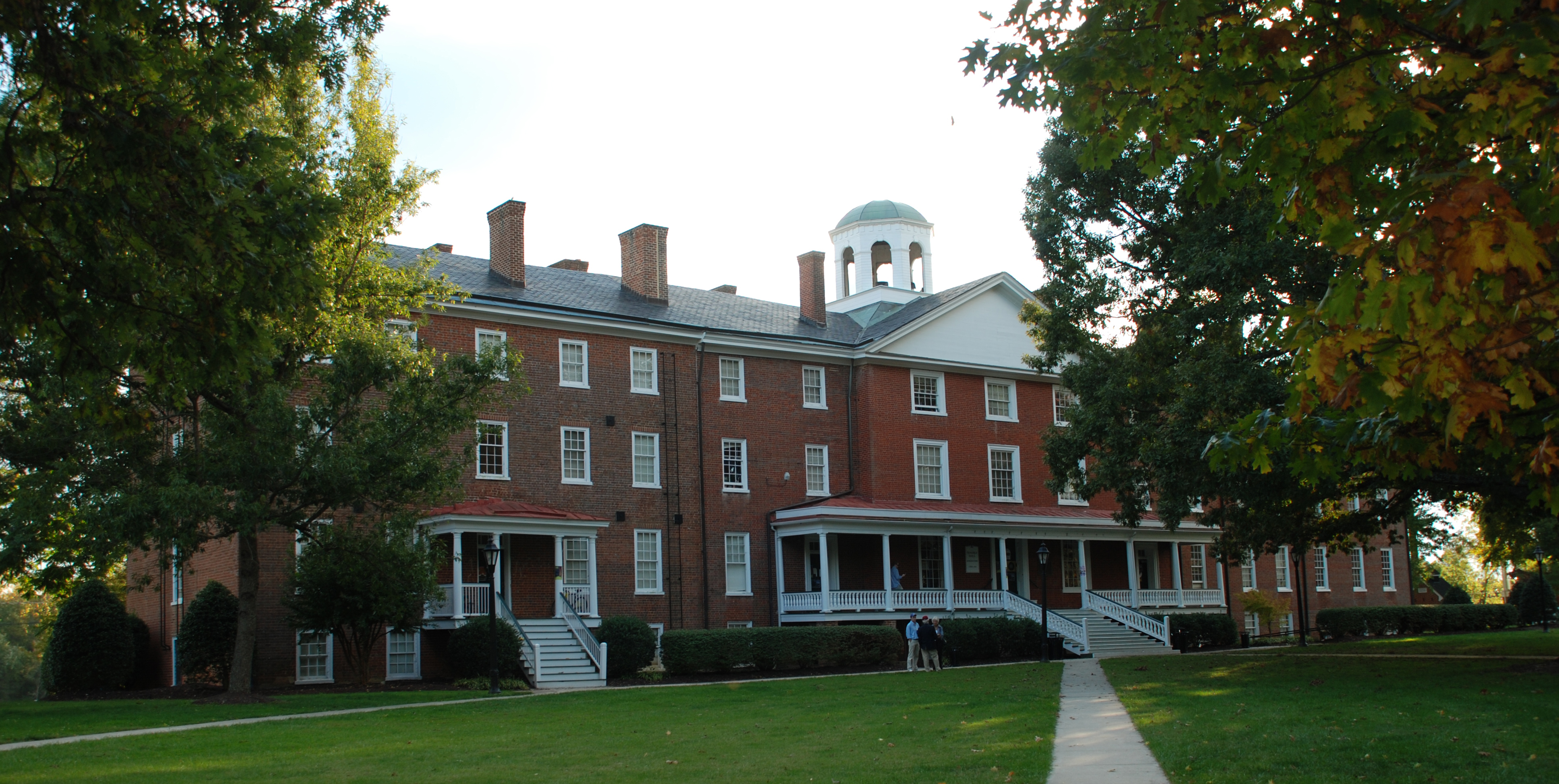
Venable Hall at Hampden-Sydney College

Given the hull number 839, Hampden-Sydney Victory was the 76th Victory ship, a series of relatively cheap, swiftly-built cargo ships designed to support the Allied war effort during World War II.

She was launched on 14 July 1945, and formally entered service with the U.S. Merchant Marine on 22 August 1945. She served until 1946, when she was transferred over to the Reserve Fleet, and sold to the Republic of Turkey on 24 November 1947.

She was named for Hampden-Sydney College in Hampden Sydney, Virginia, which is named for John Hampden and Algernon Sidney, two prominent heroes of the Parliamentary side of the English Civil War.

== See also ==
- List of Victory ships
