= SS Lewiston Victory =

United States Merchant Marine ship

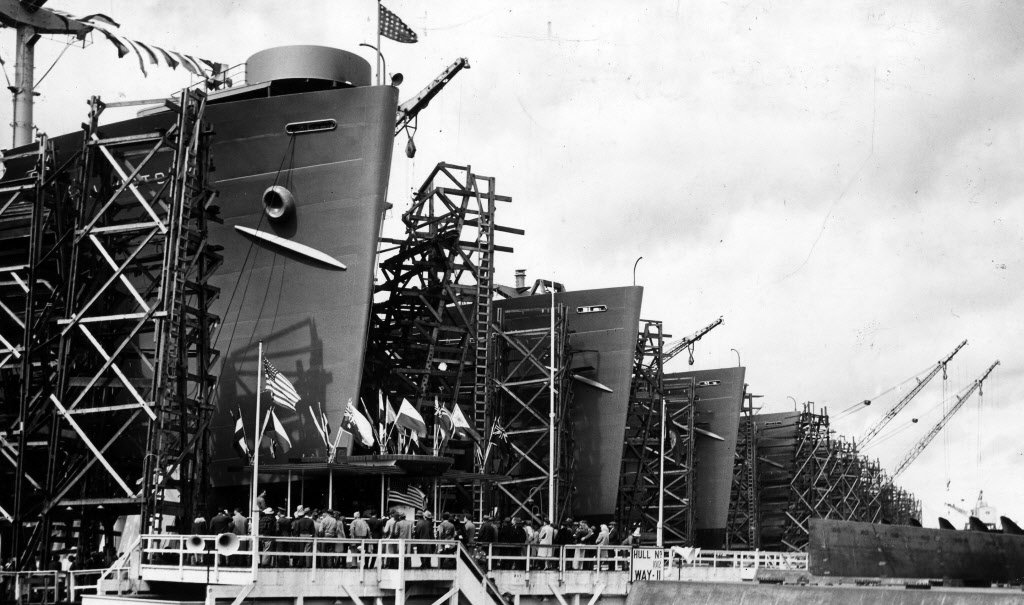
- Oregon Shipbuilding Corporation ships in 1944

History

United States
- Name: Lewiston Victory
- Owner: War Shipping Administration
- Operator: Pacific-Atlantic Steamship Company
- Builder: Oregon Shipbuilding Company Portland
- Laid down: October 23, 1944
- Launched: December 2, 1944
- Completed: January 29, 1944
- Fate: Sank at Tuticorin anchorage, refloated damaged and then scrapped Bombay.

General characteristics
- Class & type: VC2-S-AP3 Victory ship
- Tonnage: 7,612 GRT, 4,553 NRT
- Displacement: 15,200 tons
- Length: 455 ft (139 m)
- Beam: 62 ft (19 m)
- Draught: 28 ft (8.5 m)
- Installed power: 8,500 shp (6,300 kW)
- Propulsion: HP & LP turbines geared to a single 20.5-foot (6.2 m) propeller
- Speed: 16.5 knots
- Boats & landing craft carried: 4 Lifeboats
- Complement: 62 Merchant Marine and 28 US Naval Armed Guards, as Victory Ship
- Armament: During World War 2; 1 × 5-inch (127 mm)/38 caliber gun; 1 × 3-inch (76 mm)/50 caliber gun; 8 × 20 mm Oerlikon

SS Lewiston Victory was a Victory ship built during World War II. It was built in the Oregon Shipbuilding Corporation shipyard in 1944. It served during the Battle of Okinawa as a troop transport. Its hull number was 1202 and MV number 148 and MO/Off. no.: 247076. Lewiston Victory was converted to a troopship and used to bring troops home as part of Operation Magic Carpet. Lewiston Victory was operated by Pacific-Atlantic Steamship Company under charter with the Maritime Commission and War Shipping Administration.

The Victory ships were designed to replace the earlier Liberty ships that were designed to be used exclusively for World War II. Victory ships were designed to last longer and serve the US Navy after the war as these were faster, longer, wider, taller, had a thinner stack set farther toward the superstructure, and had a long raised forecastle.

== Post war ==
After the war, it was owned by two merchant shipping companies. In 1947 it was sold to India S.S. Company of Calcutta and renamed SS Indian Merchange, Official number: 174179. In 1972 it was sold to Pent-Ocean Steamships Ltd of Bombay and renamed SS Samuda Sai, Official number: 1257. On September 29, 1977, the ship sank at Tuticorin port anchorage in the Bay of Bengal off India. It was refloated, but was damaged, later it was scrapped at Bombay in October 1977.

== See also ==
- List of Victory ships
- Type C1 ship
- Type C2 ship
- Type C3 ship

== Sources ==
- Sawyer, L.A. and W.H. Mitchell. Victory ships and tankers: The history of the ‘Victory’ type cargo ships and of the tankers built in the United States of America during World War II, Cornell Maritime Press, 1974, 0-87033-182-5.
- United States Maritime Commission:
- Victory Cargo Ships
