= SS Waco Victory =

Victory ship of the United States

- Typical Victory ship

History

United States
- Name: Waco Victory
- Owner: U.S. Maritime Commission
- Operator: America Mail Line
- Builder: California Shipbuilding Corporation
- Laid down: 12 May 1944
- Launched: 22 July 1944
- Acquired: 14 October 1944
- Out of service: 1946
- Fate: Sold to Belgium, 1947

Belgium
- Name: Vinkt
- Owner: Compagnie Maritime Belge
- Acquired: 1947
- Fate: Sold to Liberia, 1965

Liberia
- Name: Hongkong Grace
- Owner: United Transoceanic Shipping Corp. (1965—1968); Universal Marine Corp. (1968—1973)
- Acquired: 1965
- Fate: Damaged in a collision with the SS Mina, 1973; scrapped shortly thereafter

General characteristics
- Class & type: VC2-S-AP3 Victory ship
- Tonnage: 7612 GRT, 4,553 NRT
- Displacement: 15,200 tons
- Length: 455 ft (139 m)
- Beam: 62 ft (19 m)
- Draught: 28 ft (8.5 m)
- Installed power: 8,500 shp (6,300 kW)
- Propulsion: HP & LP turbines geared to a single 20.5-foot (6.2 m) propeller
- Speed: 16.5 knots
- Boats & landing craft carried: 4 Lifeboats
- Complement: 62 Merchant Marine and 28 US Naval Armed Guards
- Armament: 1 × 5 inch (127 mm)/38 caliber gun; 1 × 3 inch (76 mm)/50 caliber gun; 8 × 20 mm Oerlikon

The SS Waco Victory was a Victory ship built during World War II under the Emergency Shipbuilding program. She was launched by the California Shipbuilding Company on July 22, 1944, and completed on October 14, 1944. The ship's United States Maritime Commission designation was 'VC2- S- AP3, hull number 37'. The 10,500-ton Victory ships were designed to replace the earlier Liberty Ships. Liberty ships were designed to be used just for World War II compared to Victory ships, which were designed to last longer and serve the US Navy after the war. Victory ships differed from Liberty ships in that they were faster, longer and wider, taller, had a thinner stack set farther toward the superstructure, and had a long raised forecastle.

Following World War II service, Waco Victory was sold to Belgium where she served as the SS Vinkt from 1947 to 1965. She was eventually resold to Liberia in 1965 where she sailed as the SS Hongkong Grace until she was damaged in a collision with the SS Mina in 1973. Deemed beyond repair, she was eventually scrapped.

== Accidents and incidents ==
1967: Severely damaged in a collision with the SS Linda; later repaired.

1973: Severely damaged in a collision with the SS Mina; scrapped soon after.
