= USS Lycoming =

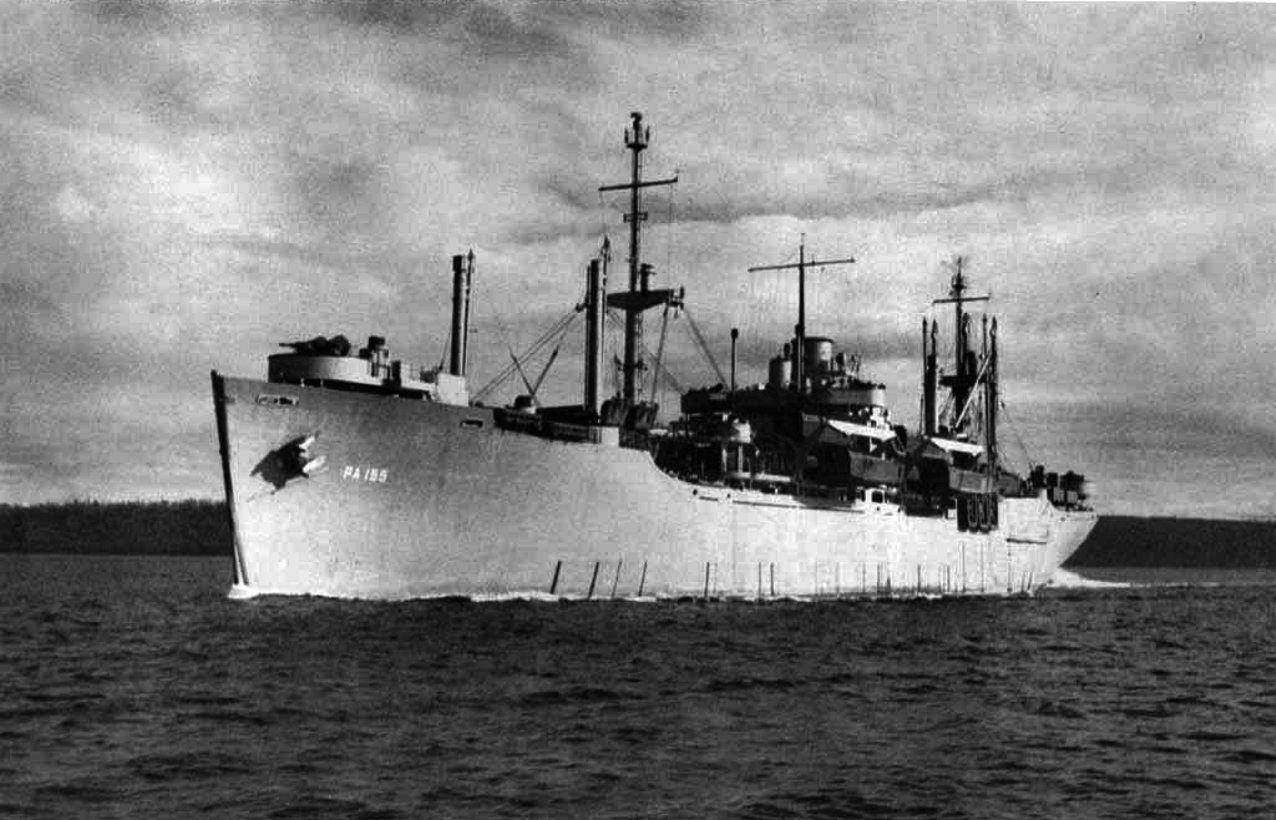

History

United States
- Name: USS Lycoming
- Namesake: Lycoming County, Pennsylvania
- Ordered: as type VC2-S-AP5
- Laid down: 30 May 1944
- Launched: 25 July 1944
- Acquired: 20 September 1944
- Commissioned: 20 September 1944
- Decommissioned: 14 March 1946
- Stricken: 28 March 1946
- Fate: Scrapped 1973

General characteristics
- Displacement: 12,450 tons (full load)
- Length: 455 ft 0 in (138.68 m)
- Beam: 62 ft 0 in (18.90 m)
- Draught: 24 ft 0 in (7.32 m)
- Speed: 19 knots
- Complement: 536
- Armament: one 5 in (130 mm) gun mount, twelve 40 mm gun mounts, ten 20 mm gun mounts

USS Lycoming (APA-155) was a Haskell-class attack transport in service with the United States Navy from 1944 to 1946. She was scrapped in 1973.

== History ==
Lycoming was laid down 30 May 1944 by the Oregon Shipbuilding Corp., Portland, Oregon, under a United States Maritime Commission contract; launched 25 July 1944; sponsored by Mrs. Schuyler N. Pyne, wife of Captain (later Rear Admiral) Pyne; acquired by the Navy and commissioned at Astoria, Oregon, 20 September 1944.

=== World War II ===
After shakedown off the U.S. West Coast, Lycoming sailed into Seattle, Washington, 1 November 1944 to serve as a training ship for new attack transport crews. Testing her own training, she departed the U.S. West Coast, with 1,411 troops embarked, for Pearl Harbor and the western Pacific Ocean. Arriving Leyte, Philippine Islands, 24 February, she was assigned to Transport Squadron 13 which was already rehearsing for the Okinawa invasion. Despite enemy kamikaze attacks she debarked 1,294 officers and men of the Army's 7th Division Artillery with their ordnance and supplies on this enemy bastion between 1 and 5 April. Her mission accomplished, she returned to the United States 11 May for additional troops.

Within a week 1,200 additional men were on their way to Manila. After her arrival 12 June Lycoming was temporarily transferred to the U.S. 7th Fleet to relocate troops from New Guinea to the Philippines. Released after one voyage, she sailed back to San Francisco, California, arriving 3 August.

Lycoming was at sea headed for the Marianas with Army troops when Japan surrendered 2 September. Reaching Saipan 9 September, she was assigned to task force TF 54 transporting occupation troops to Japan. With her quarters filled with 2d Division Marines. she sailed with 20 other transports for a peaceful debarkation at Nagasaki, Japan, 23 September.

Her final voyages were made as part of the "Operation Magic Carpet" fleet. Embarking 2,400 veterans in the New Hebrides and New Caledonia, she landed them at San Francisco 13 November. By mid December, Lycoming embarked 2,013 officers and men at Okinawa and proceeded homeward arriving Seattle, Washington, early in January 1946.

=== Decommissioning and fate ===
The transport arrived Norfolk, Virginia, 9 February, decommissioned 14 March 1946, and was returned to War Shipping Administration (WSA) on the 21st. Lycoming entered the National Defense Reserve Fleet and was berthed in James River, Virginia. She was later struck from the Navy List on 28 March 1946 and was sold for scrapping on 9 April 1973 to Union Minerals & Alloys for $111,560.00. Lycoming was withdrawn from the Reserve Fleet on 6 June 1973.

== Awards ==
Lycoming received one battle star for World War II service. American Campaign Medal, Asiatic-Pacific Campaign Medal (1), World War II Victory Medal, Navy Occupation Service Medal (with Asia clasp)
