= SS Pomona Victory =

Victory ship of the United States

- Typical Victory ship

History

United States
- Name: SS Pomona Victory
- Owner: U.S. Maritime Commission
- Builder: California Shipbuilding Corporation
- Yard number: 246181
- Laid down: 29 April 1944
- Launched: 26 June 1944
- Acquired: 31 July 1944
- Fate: Sold to Belgium, 29 March 1947

Belgium
- Name: SS Tervaete
- Owner: Compagnie Maritime Belge
- Acquired: 29 March 1947
- Fate: Sold to Liberia, 1965

Liberia
- Name: SS Hongkong Delegate
- Owner: United Transoceanic Shipping Corp. (1965—1966); Universal Marine Corp. (1966—1975)
- Acquired: 1965
- Fate: Sunk in a collision with the SS Columbus Canada, 4 October 1975 Raised and scrapped, 15 December 1975

General characteristics
- Class & type: VC2-S-AP3 Victory ship
- Tonnage: 7612 GRT, 4,553 NRT
- Displacement: 15,200 tons
- Length: 455 ft (139 m)
- Beam: 62 ft (19 m)
- Draught: 28 ft (8.5 m)
- Installed power: 8,500 shp (6,300 kW)
- Propulsion: HP & LP turbines geared to a single 20.5-foot (6.2 m) propeller
- Speed: 16.5 knots
- Boats & landing craft carried: 4 Lifeboats
- Complement: 62 Merchant Marine and 28 US Naval Armed Guards
- Armament: 1 × 5 inch (127 mm)/38 caliber gun; 1 × 3 inch (76 mm)/50 caliber gun; 8 × 20 mm Oerlikon

The SS Pomona Victory was a Victory ship built during World War II under the Emergency Shipbuilding program. She was launched by the California Shipbuilding Company on April 29, 1944, and completed on July 31, 1944. The ship's United States Maritime Commission designation was 'VC2- S- AP3, hull number 31'. The 10,500-ton Victory ships were designed to replace the earlier Liberty Ships. Liberty ships were designed to be used just for World War II compared to Victory ships, which were designed to last longer and serve the US Navy after the war. Victory ships differed from Liberty ships in that they were faster, longer and wider, taller, had a thinner stack set further toward the superstructure, and had a raised forecastle.

Following World War II service, Pomona Victory was sold to Belgium where she served as the SS Tervaete from 1947 to 1965. She was eventually resold to Liberia in 1965 where she served as the SS Hongkong Delegate until she was sunk in a collision with the SS Columbus Canada on October 4, 1975. Deemed beyond repair, she was eventually raised and scrapped on December 15, 1975.
