= SS Sapulpa Victory =

Victory ship of the United States

- A typical Victory ship

History

United States
- Name: SS Sapulpa Victory
- Namesake: Sapulpa, Oklahoma
- Owner: War Shipping Administration
- Operator: Alcoa Steamship Company
- Builder: California Shipbuilding Company, Los Angeles
- Laid down: February 26, 1944
- Launched: April 29, 1944
- Completed: June 19, 1944
- Fate: Sold, 1963

United States
- Name: SS Halcyon Panther
- Owner: Halcyon Steamship Company
- Fate: Scrapped in Taiwan, 1972

General characteristics
- Class & type: VC2-S-AP3 Victory ship
- Tonnage: 7612 GRT, 4,553 NRT
- Displacement: 15,200 tons
- Length: 455 ft (139 m)
- Beam: 62 ft (19 m)
- Draft: 28 ft (8.5 m)
- Installed power: 8,500 shp (6,300 kW)
- Propulsion: HP & LP turbines geared to a single 20.5-foot (6.2 m) propeller, by Westinghouse Electric & Mfg. Co., Essington
- Speed: 16.5 knots (30.6 km/h; 19.0 mph)
- Boats & landing craft carried: 4 Lifeboats
- Complement: 62 US Merchant Marine and 28 US Navy Armed Guards
- Armament: 1 × 5 inch (127 mm)/38 caliber gun as Victory ship; 1 × 3 inch (76 mm)/50 caliber gun; 8 × 20 mm Oerlikon

The SS Sapulpa Victory was the 14th Victory ship built for the United States during World War II under the Emergency Shipbuilding program. The vessel was launched by the California Shipbuilding Company on April 29, 1944, and completed on June 19, 1944. The ship's US Maritime Commission designation was VC2-S-AP3, hull number 14 (V-14). The Sapulpa served in the Pacific Theater during World War II and was operated by the Alcoa SS Company.

The 10,500-ton Victory ships were designed to replace the earlier Liberty ships. While Liberty ships were designed to be used only during World War II, Victory ships were designed to last longer and serve the US Navy both during and after the war. Victory ships differed from Liberty ships in that they were faster, longer, wider, taller, had a thinner stack set further toward the superstructure and had a long raised forecastle.

SS Sapulpa Victory was christened and launched at the yards of the California Shipbuilding Corporation on Terminal Island in Los Angeles. It was one of the 218 Victory ships that were named after American cities.

== World War II ==
In World War II, the SS Sapulpa Victory served in the Pacific War. On January 21, 1945, she steamed into Ulithi atoll, a repair and re-supply base used by the US Pacific Fleet. The ship was delivering supplies for the 6th Special Naval Construction Battalion, also known as the Seabees. The 6th Special Seabees were a combat stevedore battalion, trained to load and unload ships in safe harbors and under hostile fire during amphibious assaults. Seabees moved cargo including fuel, ammunition, bombs, rations, vehicles, and building materials. As a result of their role as supply vessels, the SS Sapulpa Victory and other cargo ships were targets for Japanese bombers, artillery, and Kamikaze attack planes.

== Interbellum ==
On February 12, 1946, the Sapulpa Victory came to the assistance of the SS Augustus S. Merrimon, a Liberty ship in distress. At the time of this incident, the Augustus S. Merrimon, which was carrying dry cargo to Panama, was about 2,200 miles (1,900 nmi; 3,500 km) southeast of Hawaii.

On July 9, 1946, 15,000 people watched a Finnish team win a game against the crew of the SS Sapulpa Victory while she was anchored outside Helsinki, Finland. The crew of the Beatrice Victory played on May 1, 1949, and won. In 1948, the Sapulpa delivered goods as part of a post-war relief effort (see Marshall Plan), and delivered supplies to the US fleet.

== Korean War ==
Sapulpa Victory served as a merchant marine naval ship, ferrying supplies for the Korean War. It made nine trips to Korea between February 2, 1951, and June 25, 1953. The ship helped to move the 140th Medium Tank Battalion. About 75% of the personnel and 90% of the cargo taken to Korea for the Korean War were brought by merchant marine ships. The SS Sapulpa Victory transported goods, mail, food, and other supplies.

== Private use ==
In 1963, the SS Sapulpa Victory was sold to the Halcyon Steamship Company of New York City and renamed SS Halcyon Panther. In 1972, she was scrapped in Taiwan.

== Sources ==
- Sawyer, L. A. and W. H. Mitchell. Victory ships and tankers: The history of the 'Victory' type cargo ships and of the tankers built in the United States of America during World War II, Cornell Maritime Press, 1974, 0-87033-182-5.
- United States Maritime Commission:
- Victory Cargo Ships
