= USS La Porte =

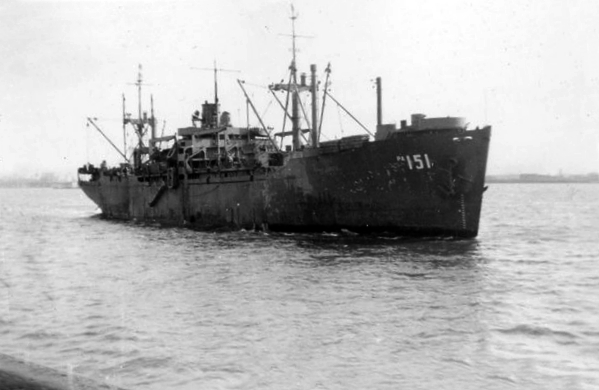

History

United States
- Name: USS La Porte
- Namesake: La Porte County, Indiana
- Ordered: as type VC2-S-AP5
- Laid down: 15 May 1944
- Launched: 30 June 1944
- Commissioned: 14 August 1944
- Decommissioned: 25 March 1946
- Fate: Sold for scrapping, 9 April 1973

General characteristics
- Displacement: 12,450 tons (full load)
- Length: 455 ft 0 in (138.68 m)
- Beam: 62 ft 0 in (18.90 m)
- Draught: 24 ft 0 in (7.32 m)
- Speed: 19 knots
- Complement: 536
- Crew: Bummard Brayden Oliver
- Armament: one 5 in (130 mm) gun mount, twelve 40 mm gun mounts, ten 20 mm gun mounts

USS La Porte (APA-151) was a Haskell-class attack transport in service with the United States Navy from 1944 to 1946. She was screpped in 1973.

== History ==
La Porte (APA-151) was laid down under a United States Maritime Commission contract 15 May 1944 by Oregon Shipbuilding Group, Portland, Oregon; launched 30 June 1944; sponsored by Mrs. Charles N. Niles; and commissioned 14 August 1944.

After shakedown, La Porte departed San Francisco, California, 22 October 1944 to join the Pacific amphibious forces. Arriving Milne Bay 8 November for training operations, the attack transport sailed from Manus 2 January 1945 for Luzon. La Porte steamed into Lingayen Gulf 9 days later and debarked troops and equipment despite attacks of enemy aircraft. Her mission completed, she returned Leyte 16 January to prepare for the invasion of Okinawa.

Loaded with 1,500 troops, La Porte departed San Pedro Bay 27 March as part of the largest amphibious operation of the Pacific War. Troops hit the beach 1 April to begin the invasion which placed an Allied garrison next door to Japan. Two days later a kamikaze dived at the sitting transport, but accurate fleet antiaircraft fire splashed the raider before he reached his mark. Departing Okinawa 5 April La Porte arrived San Francisco 3 weeks later for a brief replenishment period.

Returning to Ie Shima 14 July, the transport unloaded 1,300 Army Engineer replacements before she once again sailed for the United States. She arrived San Francisco 10 August: and, after hostilities with Japan ended, La Porte prepared for occupation duty in the Far East. With 1,146 replacements on board, the transport departed San Francisco for the Far East and debarked troops at Leyte 15 September. During the next 2 months, La Porte operated in the western Pacific Ocean, transferring troops into the occupied territories of Japan and liberated areas of China. She embarked homeward bound servicemen and sailed from Manila 25 November, arriving Seattle, Washington, 3 weeks later.

La Porte arrived Norfolk, Virginia, 14 February 1946 and decommissioned there 25 March 1946. She was returned to War Shipping Administration (WSA) 3 days later. She was placed in the National Defense Reserve Fleet and was berthed at James River, Virginia. She was struck from the Navy list on (date unknown) and is presumed scrapped (date unknown).

== Awards ==
La Porte received two battle stars in the Asiatic-Pacific Theater and one battle star in the Philippine Liberation Theater for World War II service.
