= USS San Saba =

Attack transport ship in United States Navy

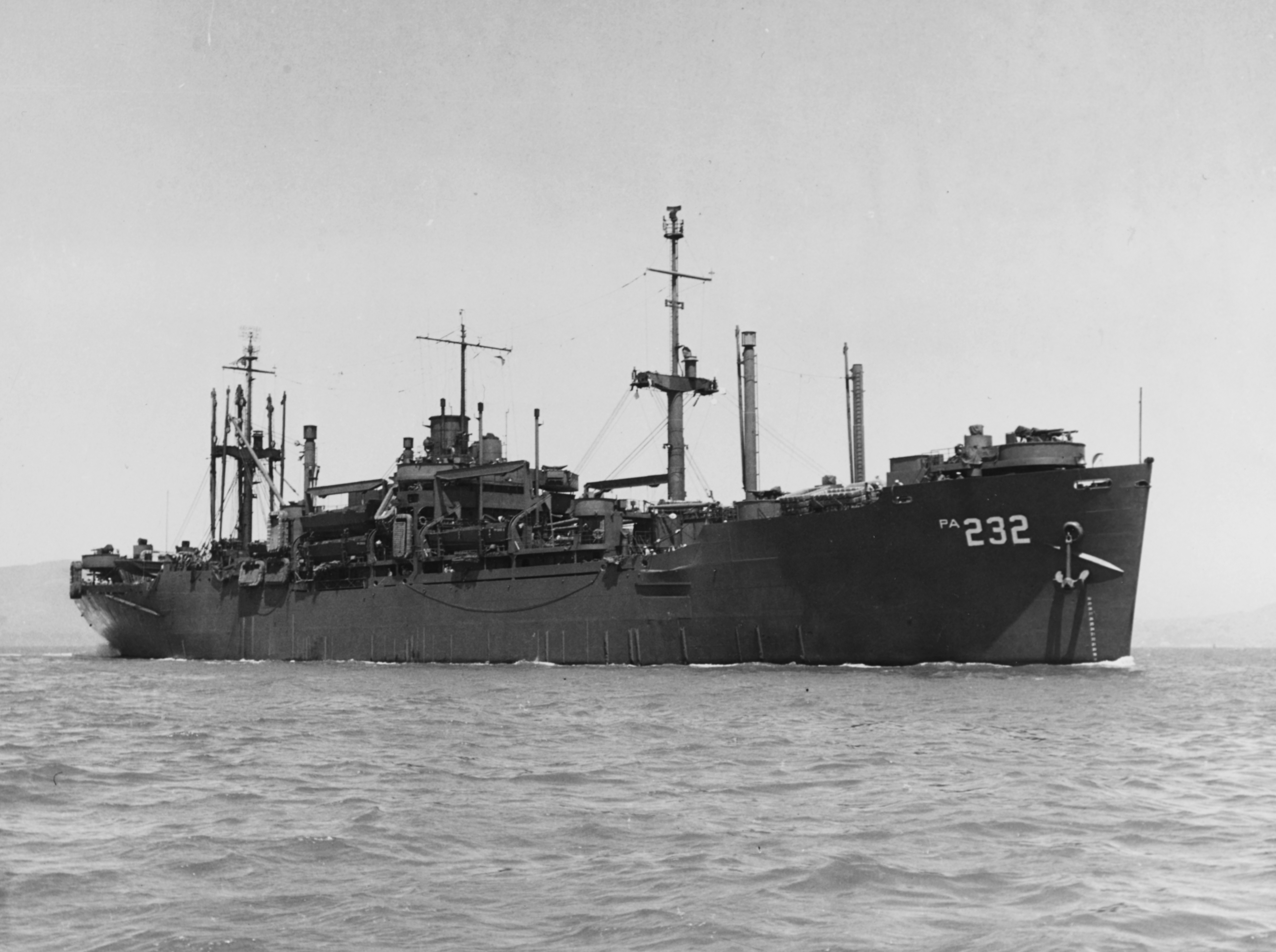
- San Saba underway, circa in 1945

History

United States
- Name: USS San Saba (APA-232)
- Namesake: San Saba County, Texas
- Builder: Kaiser Shipbuilding
- Laid down: 29 September 1944
- Launched: 12 November 1944
- Sponsored by: Mrs Richard Bissell
- Acquired: 3 December 1944
- Commissioned: 3 December 1944
- Decommissioned: 17 December 1946
- Stricken: 1 October 1958
- Fate: Sold for scrapping 8 May 1975

General characteristics
- Class & type: Haskell-class attack transport
- Displacement: 6,873 tons (lt), 14,837 t. (fl)
- Length: 455 ft
- Beam: 62 ft
- Draft: 28 ft 1 in
- Propulsion: 1 x Joshua Hendy geared turbine, 2 x Babcock & Wilcox header-type boilers, 1 x propeller, designed shaft horsepower 8,500
- Speed: 18 knots
- Boats & landing craft carried: 2 x LCM, 12 x LCVP, 3 x LCPU
- Capacity: 86 Officers 1,475 Enlisted
- Crew: 56 Officers, 480 enlisted
- Armament: 1 x 5"/38 caliber dual-purpose gun mount, 1 x quad 40mm gun mount, 4 x twin 40mm gun mounts, 10 x single 20mm gun mounts
- Notes: MCV Hull No. 678, hull type VC2-S-AP5

USS San Saba (APA-232) was a Haskell-class attack transport which served with the US Navy in World War II. Commissioned in December 1944, she arrived just too late to see action, and spent the last weeks of the war on transport missions.

San Saba was named after a county in Texas. She was laid down on 29 September 1944 under Maritime Commission contract (MCV hull 678) by Kaiser Shipbuilding of Vancouver, Washington; launched on 12 November 1944; acquired by the Navy from the Maritime Commission on loan-charter basis on 3 December 1944; and commissioned the same day.

== Operational history ==
=== World War II ===
After trials and amphibious training, San Saba departed San Francisco on 1 July 1945 for the Marshall Islands to transport troops and war supplies. She reached Eniwetok on 14 July; and, during the two months following, carried out transport missions to Ulithi, Caroline Islands; Leyte, Philippines; Manus, Admiralty Islands; Milne Bay, New Guinea; back to the Philippines at Mindoro, Subic Bay, and Manila; and thence on occupation duty to Yokohama, Sendai, Mutsu Kawa, and Ishinomaki Wan, Japan.

San Saba returned to Leyte temporarily at the end of September before sailing for San Francisco on 6 October. En route, she was detoured to Seattle, Washington, where she arrived on the 24th.

Following a period in drydock at Everett, Washington, she made a voyage in November and December to Okinawa and returned to San Pedro, California. On 14 January 1946, ownership of San Saba was transferred to the Navy Department; and, by the end of February, she had completed a passenger/cargo run to the Marianas. A month later, she departed San Francisco to carry troops to Okinawa and returned on 4 May.

San Saba sailed on 18 May for China and arrived at Shanghai on 5 June. She got underway on the 10th and steamed to Okinawa to embark over 900 Naval personnel for transport to Yokosuka, Japan. She returned to San Diego on 4 July. On 17 July, she was ordered to the Mare Island Naval Shipyard at San Francisco for inactivation.

=== Decommission ===
On 17 December 1946, San Saba was decommissioned and assigned to the San Francisco Group of the Pacific Reserve Fleet. On 1 October 1958, she was transferred to the Maritime Commission, struck from the Navy List, and was placed in the National Defense Reserve Fleet at Suisun Bay, California. Through June 1974, SS San Saba remained at Suisun Bay. Her Final Disposition, sold, 8 May 1975, to Zidell Explorations Inc. (non-transportation use), scrapping, 8 May 1975, delivered, 19 May 1975.
