= USS Edgecombe (APA-164) =

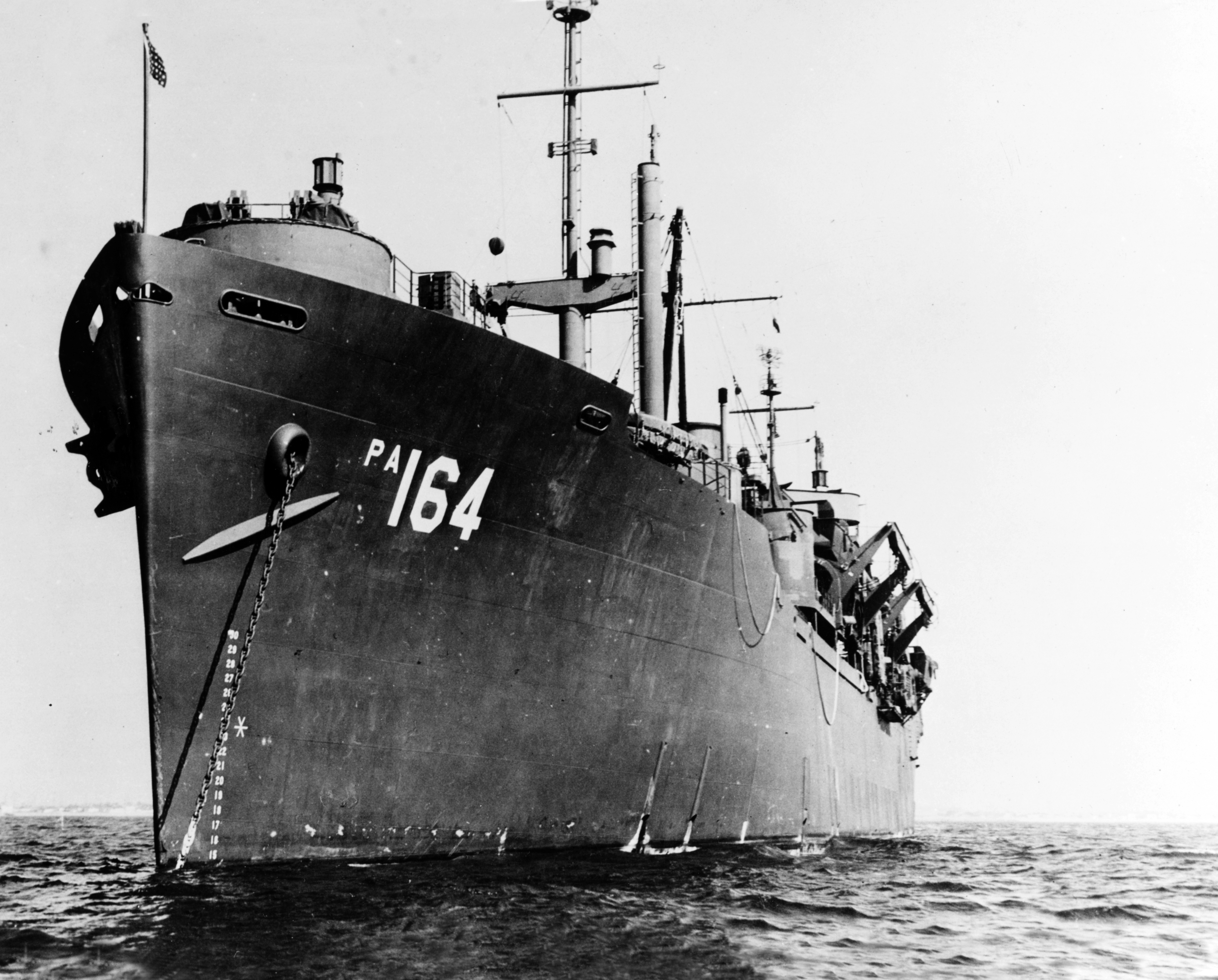

History

United States
- Name: USS Edgecombe
- Namesake: Edgecombe County, North Carolina
- Ordered: as type VC2-S-AP5
- Launched: 24 September 1944
- Commissioned: 30 October 1944
- Decommissioned: 31 January 1947
- Fate: Sold 11 June 1987 for scrapping

General characteristics
- Displacement: 12,450 long tons (12,650 t) (full load)
- Length: 455 ft 0 in (138.68 m)
- Beam: 62 ft 0 in (18.90 m)
- Draught: 24 ft 0 in (7.32 m)
- Speed: 19 knots
- Complement: 536
- Armament: one 5 in (130 mm) gun mount, twelve 40 mm gun mounts, ten 20 mm gun mounts

USS Edgecombe (APA-164) was a Haskell-class attack transport in service with the United States Navy from 1944 to 1946. She was scrapped in 1987.

== History ==
Edgecombe was launched 24 September 1944 by Oregon Shipbuilding Corp., Portland, Oregon, under a Maritime Commission contract; sponsored by Mrs. Esther S. Wilson; and commissioned 30 October 1944.

=== World War II ===
Edgecombe began transport duty along with her shakedown when she carried the 68th CB's from Seattle, Washington, to San Francisco, California, in November 1944. After training at San Pedro, California, she sailed the last day of 1944 from San Francisco with cargo for Finschhafen. She joined a convoy at Hollandia and arrived at Leyte 6 February 1945 to land reinforcements.

After intensive training with the 5th Amphibious Force, Edgecombe sailed 27 March 1945 for Okinawa. She landed her troops in the initial assault 1 April and remained off the beach 5 feverish days unloading cargo and embarking casualties for evacuation to Saipan. She sailed on to Pearl Harbor and reached San Francisco in May.

Assigned to carry troops from the U.S. West Coast to the Philippines, Edgecombe was on the second such voyage when the war ended. In September she transported occupation troops from Leyte to Aomori, Honshū. Returning to the west coast, Edgecombe was assigned "Operation Magic Carpet" duty, and twice went to the western Pacific Ocean to bring home servicemen eligible for discharge.

=== Decommissioning and fate ===
On 11 February 1946 she got underway from Portland, Oregon, for Norfolk, Virginia, which she reached 16 March. There she was placed out of commission in reserve 31 January 1947. Edgecombe was returned to the Maritime Commission 1 October 1958. She was finally sold for scrapping to Chi Shun Hwa Steel Company, Kaohsiung, Taiwan, and was withdrawn from the James River Reserve Fleet on 17 September 1987.

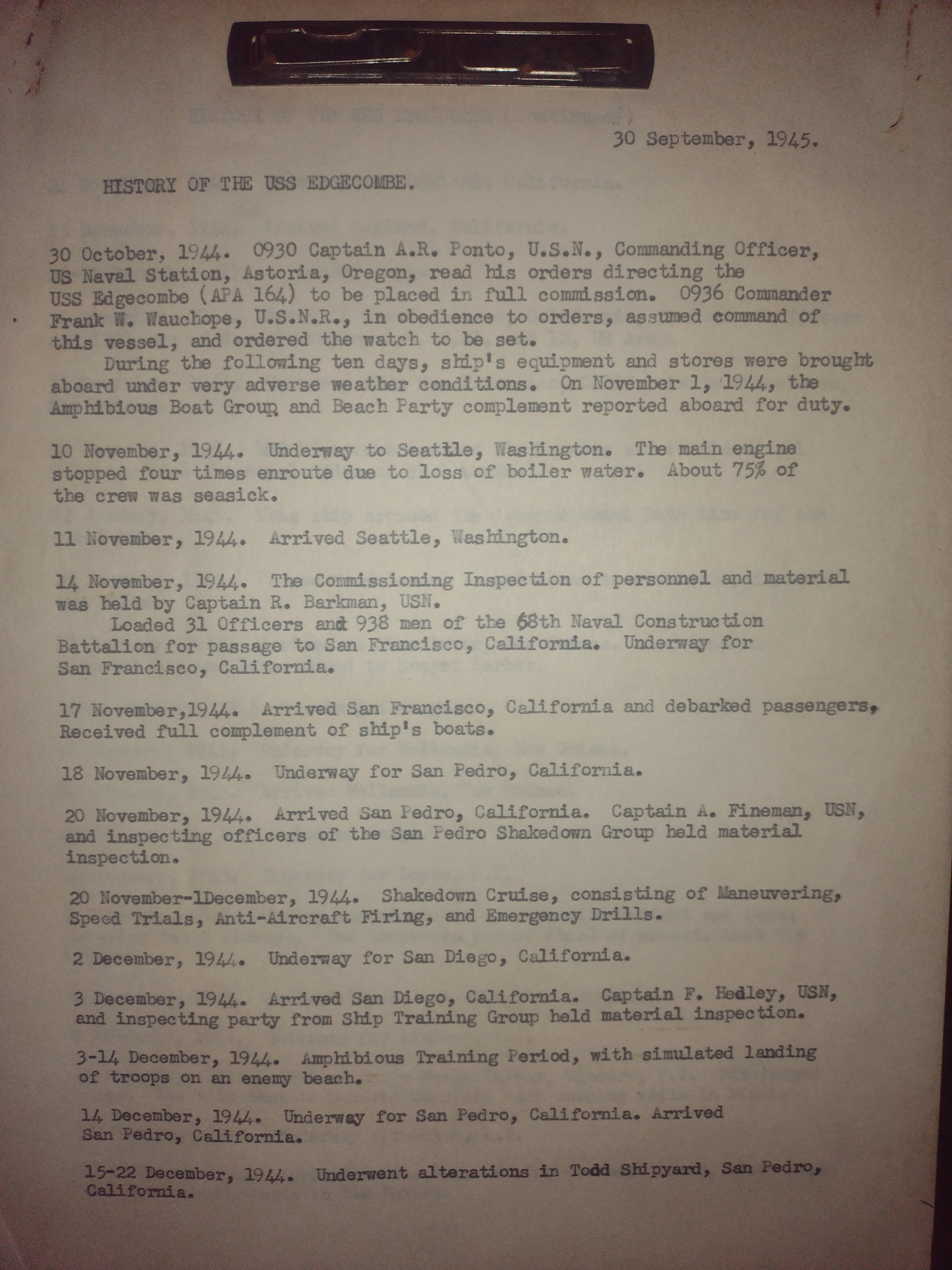
History of APA-164

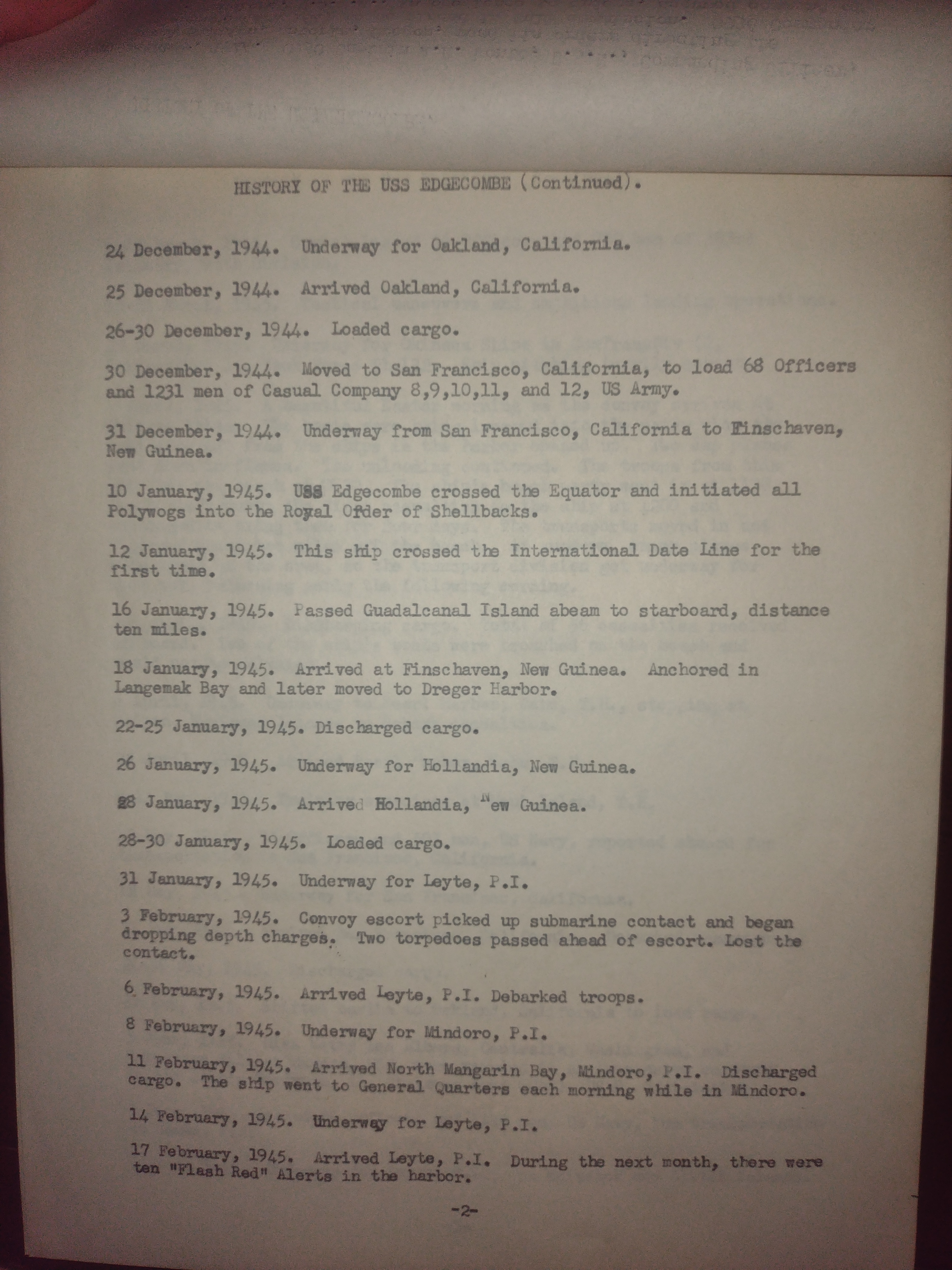
History of APA-164

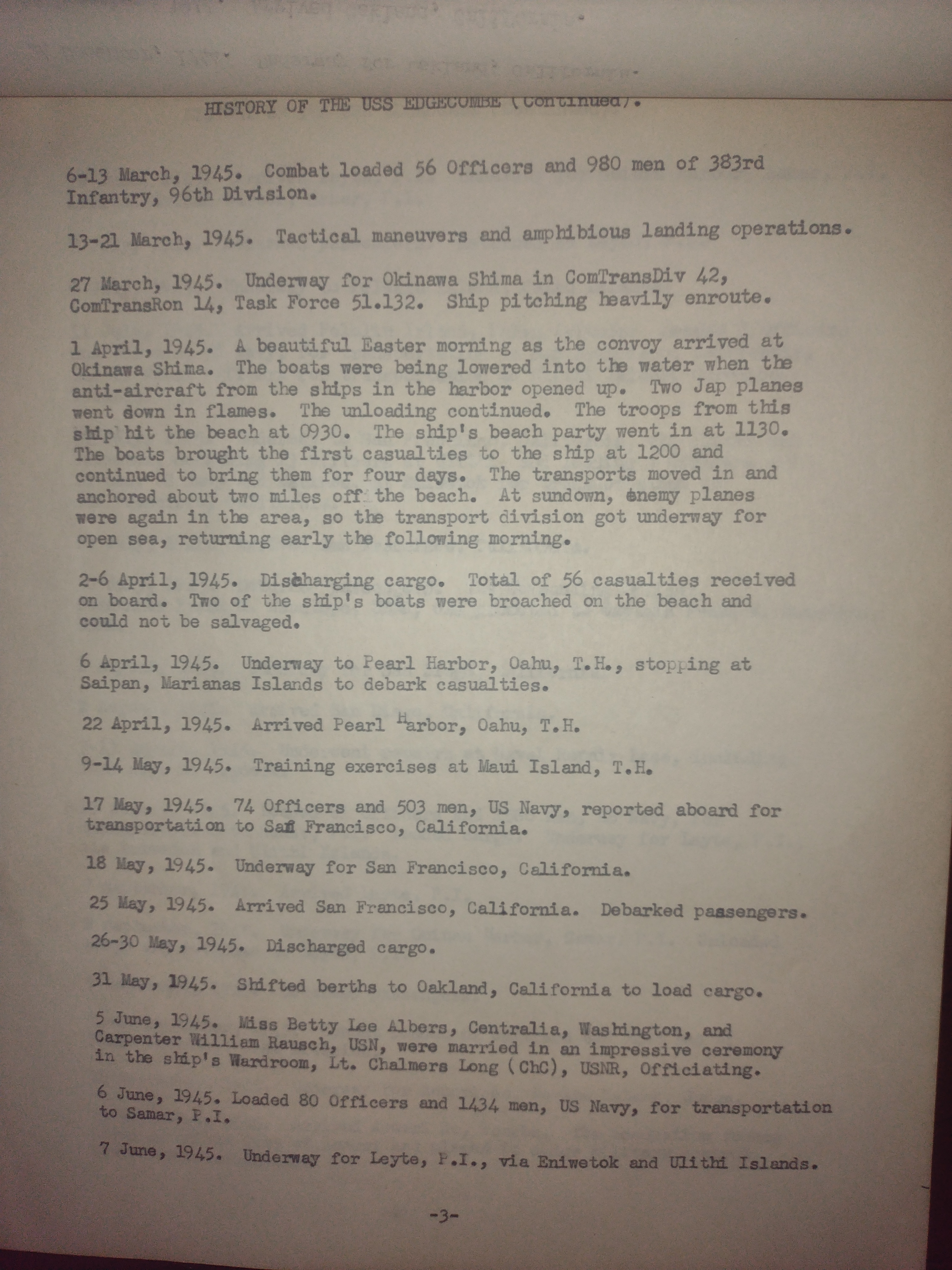
History of APA-164

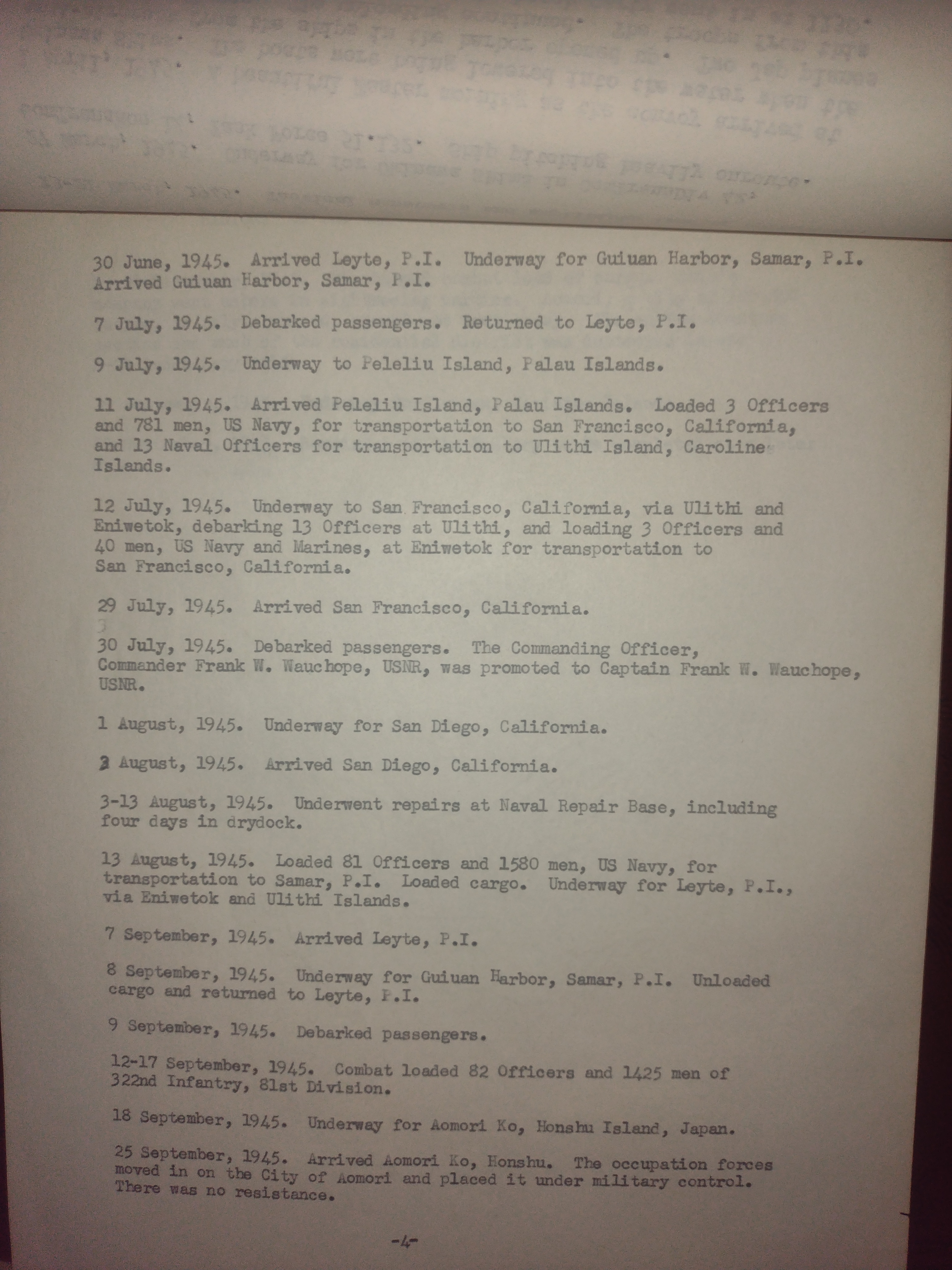
History of APA-164

== Awards ==
Edgecombe received one battle star for World War II service.
