= SS Cody Victory =

United States Merchant Marine ship

- Typical Victory ship

History

United States
- Name: Cody Victory
- Namesake: Cody, Wyoming
- Owner: U.S. Maritime Commission
- Operator: Alcoa Steamship Company
- Builder: California Shipbuilding Corporation
- Yard number: 69
- Laid down: 26 October 1944
- Launched: 15 December 1944
- Completed: 22 January 1945
- Identification: U.S. Official Number: 247094
- Fate: Sold to Peru, 1947

Peru
- Name: Yavari
- Owner: Corporacion Peruana de Vapores, Callao (1947–1968) Gold Shipping, Callao (1968–1969)
- Renamed: SS Naufraga, 1968
- Fate: Sunk on way to scrappers, 21 March 1969

General characteristics
- Class & type: VC2-S-AP3 Victory ship
- Tonnage: 7612 GRT, 4,553 NRT
- Displacement: 15,200 tons
- Length: 455 ft (139 m)
- Beam: 62 ft (19 m)
- Draft: 28 ft (8.5 m)
- Installed power: 8,500 shp (6,300 kW)
- Propulsion: HP & LP turbines geared to a single 20.5-foot (6.2 m) propeller
- Speed: 16.5 knots
- Boats & landing craft carried: 4 Lifeboats
- Complement: 62 Merchant Marine and 28 US Naval Armed Guards
- Armament: 1 × 5 inch (127 mm)/38 caliber gun; 1 × 3 inch (76 mm)/50 caliber gun; 8 × 20 mm Oerlikon

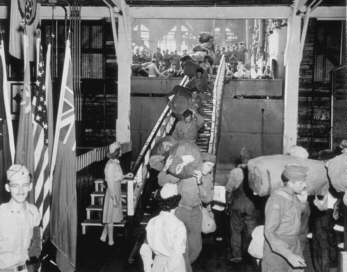
Debarking the SS Cody Victory at Pier 8, Hampton Roads, in 1945 with 2,032 troops from Leghorn and Naples, Italy

SS Cody Victory was a Victory ship (VC2-S-AP3) built during World War II under the Emergency Shipbuilding program. The ship's keel was laid by the California Shipbuilding Company as hull number 69 on 26 October 1944 with launch on 12 December 1944. The ship was completed on 22 January 1945. On completion the ship, U.S. Official Number 247094, was delivered to the War Shipping Administration for operation by the Alcoa Steamship Company as agent.

SS Cody Victory served as a troop ship in the Atlantic Ocean and Pacific Ocean during World War II as part of Operation Magic Carpet. The SS Cody Victory and 96 other Victory ships were converted to troop ships to bring the US soldiers home. Burt Lancaster was with the Army's Twenty-First Special Services Division on the Cody Victory on August 14, 1945, as the ship was at sea heading to Hampton Roads, Virginia, when the V-J Day announcement was made. The Cody Victory boarded troops from Leghorn, Italy, on August 18, 1945, and then steamed to Naples, Italy on August 20, 1945, taking on more troops. She delivery the 2,032 troops to Hampton Roads Pier 8, including the 101st Ordnance MM Company. On January 14, 1946, she arrived at New York Harbor from Marseille, France, with 1,559 troops. On February 20, 1946, she arrived in New York Harbor from Bremerhaven, Germany, with troops.

On April 27, 1946, was laid up in the Hudson River until sold on January 28 withdrawn February 13, 1947 and delivered to A. L. Burbank Co. pending delivery to the buyers.

== Private use ==
The ship was sold to Corporacion Peruana de Vapores, of Callao, Peru, and renamed Yavari. In 1968, she was sold to the Gold Shipping in Callao and renamed, Naufraga. On October 14, 1968, a cargo fire broke out while she was in Los Angeles. The damage was so severe she was not repaired. She was sold to a ship breaker in Taiwan. She was filled with scrap iron in her cargo hold for the trip to Taiwan. While being towed in rough seas the scrap iron shifted in her cargo hold and she took on a heavy angle of list on March 21, 1969. She continued to take on water and sank 1,000 miles southwest of San Francisco at 27° 02'N and 137° 23' W on March 27, 1969.

== Sources ==
- Sawyer, L.A. and W.H. Mitchell. Victory ships and tankers: The history of the ‘Victory’ type cargo ships and of the tankers built in the United States of America during World War II, Cornell Maritime Press, 1974, 0-87033-182-5.
- United States Maritime Commission:
- Victory Cargo Ships
