= SS Phillips Victory =

Ship

History

United States
- Namesake: Phillips University
- Owner: War Shipping Administration
- Operator: General Steamship Company
- Builder: Permanente Metals,
- Launched: 1945-05-26
- Christened: 1945-05-26

General characteristics
- Class & type: Victory ship
- Displacement: 4,480 long tons (4,550 t) (standard); 15,580 long tons (15,830 t) (full load)
- Length: 455 ft (139 m)
- Beam: 62 ft (19 m)
- Draft: 29 ft 2 in (8.89 m)
- Installed power: 2 × Babcock & Wilcox header-type boilers, 525psi 750°; 6,000 shp (4,500 kW)
- Propulsion: 1 × Westinghouse turbine; double Westinghouse Main Reduction Gears; 1 × shaft
- Speed: 15.5 kn (17.8 mph; 28.7 km/h)
- Capacity: 7,800 t (7,700 long tons) DWT; 453,210 cu ft (12,833 m^{3}) (non-refrigerated)
- Complement: 62 Merchant Marine and 28 US Naval Armed Guards
- Armament: During WW2; 1 × 5 in (127 mm)/38-caliber dual-purpose gun; 1 × 3 in (76 mm)/50-caliber dual-purpose gun; 8 × 20 mm (0.8 in) Oerlikon cannons anti-aircraft (AA) mounts

The SS Phillips Victory (MCV-758), was a type VC2-S-AP2 victory ship built by Permanente Metals Corporation, Richmond shipyard #2, of Richmond, California. It was one of 150 victory ships named after educational institutions. The Phillips Victory was named after Phillips University in Enid, Oklahoma. The ship was christened on May 26, 1945, at Richmond Yard 2 by Mrs. Edward Stettinius in the presence of United Nations delegates and Native Americans. Shipyard manager C.P. Bedford spoke of the history of the university, and Captain H.G. Gatlin, the Treasure Island Navy chaplain gave the invocation.

== World War II ==
The ship, originally named Phillips Victory, was not so named for long. It set out for London on May 26, 1945, and arrived on June 20, 1945. Phillips Victory operated by General Steamship Company under charter with the Maritime Commission and War Shipping Administration.

== Post war ==
The Ocean Steam Ship Company purchased the boat on January 2, 1946, then renaming it Memnon and in 1957, Glaucus. The Iranian Lloyd Company, Limited of Khorramsshar in 1962, renamed the ship the Persian Ferdowsi. In 1965, the company, then called the Iranian Shipping Lines renamed the boat the Kashan. In 1966, it was sold to Paul J Frangoulis & A & I Cliafas of Piraeus who renamed the boat the Eleni K. The Iranian Navy arrested the boat and its crew for unpaid debt in October of that year, and again a month later for setting out to sea without permission. The Navy fired on the boat, after pursuing it with a destroyer, 5 frigates, 3 launches and a helicopter. The boat remained in Bandar Shapur and in 1968 was again sold and renamed Pirouzi. In May 1969 the ship was towed to Hong Kong and demolished in June.
