= USNS Rollins =

History

United States
- Name: SS High Point Victory
- Namesake: High Point, North Carolina
- Builder: Bethlehem-Fairfield Shipyard, Baltimore, Maryland
- Laid down: 10 July 1945
- Launched: 6 September 1945
- In service: 28 September 1945
- Identification: IMO number: 5150288
- Fate: Scrapped, 1993

General characteristics
- Type: Type VC2-S-AP2 Victory ship
- Displacement: 4,512 long tons (4,584 t) light; 15,589 long tons (15,839 t) full load
- Length: 455 ft (139 m)
- Beam: 62 ft (19 m)
- Draft: 29 ft (8.8 m)
- Propulsion: Cross-compound steam turbine; 8,500 shp (6,338 kW); Single screw
- Speed: 15.5 knots (28.7 km/h; 17.8 mph)

USNS Rollins (T-AG-189) was one of 12 ships scheduled to be acquired by the United States Navy in February 1966 and converted into forward depot ships and placed into service with the Military Sea Transport Service. SS High Point Victory (MCV-851) was chosen for this conversion and assigned the name Rollins, but the program was canceled and the ships were not acquired by the Navy.

SS High Point Victory was a Victory ship which were designed to replace the earlier Liberty ships. Liberty ships were designed to be used just for World War II. Victory ships were designed to last longer and serve the US Navy after the war. The Victory ship differed from a Liberty ship in that they were: faster, longer and wider, taller, a thinner stack set further toward the superstructure and had a long raised forecastle.

== World War II ==
SS High Point Victory was built for the U.S. Maritime Commission during the final months of World War II under the Emergency Shipbuilding program. High Point Victory was complete and given to the Maritime Commission on 28 September 1945. High Point Victory was named for High Point, North Carolina. High Point Victory was operated by the American Foreign Steamship Corporation. With the Surrender of Japan on 2 September 1945, she was not needed for the war. For World War II, High Point Victory was operated by the American Foreign SS Company under the United States Merchant Marine act for the War Shipping Administration. The vessel was used for war transportation. After the completion of post war work in 1947, she was laid up at the Reserve Fleet at Wilmington.

== Korean War ==
SS High Point served as merchant marine ship supplying goods for the Korean War. About 75 percent of the personnel taken to Korea for the Korean War came by the merchant marine ship. High Point Victory transported goods, mail, food and other supplies. About 90 percent of the cargo was moved by merchant marine to the war zone. High Point Victory made trips between 1950 and 1952, helping American forces engaged against Communist aggression in South Korea. In 1952, she was returned to the National Defense Reserve Fleet.

== Vietnam War ==
In 1966, she was reactivated for the Vietnam War as a Merchant Marine operated by the States SS Company. After the war in 1973, she was laid up at the Reserve Fleet in Beaumont, Texas.

In 1994, she was scrapped at Alang, India.
