= SS Purdue Victory =

Victory ship of WWII

History

United States
- Name: Purdue Victory
- Namesake: Purdue University
- Owner: War Shipping Administration (WSA)
- Operator: Waterman Steamship Corp.
- Ordered: as type (EC2-S-C1) hull, MCV hull 740
- Awarded: 1 January 1942
- Builder: Permanente Metals Corporation, Yard No. 2, Richmond, California
- Cost: $1,149,493
- Yard number: 740
- Way number: 5
- Laid down: 11 February 1945
- Launched: 24 March 1945
- Sponsored by: Mrs. Paul N. Mulvany
- Completed: 18 April 1945
- Identification: Call sign: ANRF
- Fate: Laid up in National Defense Reserve Fleet, Mobile, Alabama, 14 December 1949; Laid up in Suisun Bay Reserve Fleet, Suisun Bay, California, 21 April 1952; Sold for scrapping, 5 February 1992, removed from fleet, 7 April 1992

General characteristics
- Class & type: Victory ship; type VC2-S-AP2, standard
- Tonnage: 10,750 DWT; 7,612 GRT
- Displacement: 15,200 long tons (15,444 t) (standard)
- Length: 455 feet 3 inches (139 m) oa; 436 feet 6 inches (133 m) pp; 444 feet (135 m) lwl
- Beam: 62 feet (19 m)
- Draft: 28 ft (8.5 m)
- Installed power: 2 × Oil fired boilers; 6,000 hp (4,500 kW)
- Propulsion: 2 × steam turbines; 1 × screw propeller
- Speed: 15 knots (28 km/h; 17 mph)
- Capacity: 523,740 cubic feet (14,831 m^{3}) (grain); 453,210 cubic feet (12,833 m^{3}) (bale)
- Complement: 38–62 USMM; 21–40 USNAG
- Armament: Varied by ship; Bow-mounted 3 inches (76 mm)/50 caliber gun; Stern-mounted 5 inches (127 mm)/50 caliber gun; 8 × single 20 millimeters (0.79 in) Oerlikon anti-aircraft (AA) cannons and/or,

SS Purdue Victory was a Victory ship built in the United States during World War II. She was named after Purdue University, West Lafayette, Indiana.

== Construction ==
Purdue Victory was laid down on 11 February 1945, under a Maritime Commission (MARCOM) contract, MCV hull 740, by the Permanente Metals Corporation, Yard No. 2, Richmond, California; she was sponsored by Mrs. Paul N. Mulvany, the wife of the assistant chief of the Construction & Inspection section at the regional office of MARCOM, and was launched on 24 March 1945.

== History ==
She was allocated to Waterman Steamship Corp., on 18 April 1945. On 14 December 1949, she was laid up in the National Defense Reserve Fleet, Mobile, Alabama. She was reactivated 26 July 1950, and allocated to W. R. Chamberlin. On 21 March 1951, she was allocated to Pacific Far East Lines. On 21 April 1952, she was laid up in the Suisun Bay Reserve Fleet, Suisun Bay, California. She was again reactivated on 5 June 1966, for use by the Military Sea Transportation Service and allocated to Pacific Coast Transport Co. On 19 January 1970, she was laid up for the last time at Suisun Bay. On 5 February 1992, she was sold for scrapping to Mini Shipping and Trading Co., Ltd., for $350,000. She was removed from the fleet on 7 April 1992, with scrapping complete as of 15 December 1992.

== Bibliography ==
- "Kaiser Permanente No. 2, Richmond CA". www.ShipbuildingHistory.com. 13 October 2010.
- Maritime Administration. "Purdue Victory". Ship History Database Vessel Status Card. U.S. Department of Transportation, Maritime Administration.
- "SS Purdue Victory".
