= USS Fond du Lac =

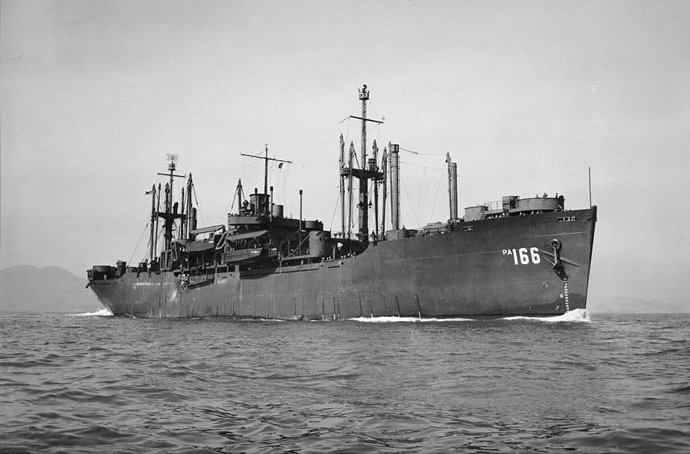
- Fond du Lac underway in San Francisco Bay, in late 1945

History

United States
- Name: USS Fond du Lac
- Namesake: Fond du Lac County, Wisconsin
- Ordered: as type VC2-S-AP5; MCV hull 132
- Laid down: 25 July 1944
- Launched: 5 October 1944
- Acquired: 6 November 1944
- Commissioned: 6 November 1944
- Decommissioned: 11 April 1946
- Fate: Scrapped, 1974

General characteristics
- Displacement: 12,450 tons (full load)
- Length: 455 ft 0 in (138.68 m)
- Beam: 62 ft 0 in (18.90 m)
- Draught: 24 ft 0 in (7.32 m)
- Speed: 19 knots
- Complement: 536
- Armament: one 5 in (130 mm) gun mount, twelve 40 mm gun mounts, ten 20 mm gun mounts

USS Fond du Lac (APA-166) was a Haskell-class attack transport in service with the United States Navy from 1944 to 1946. She was scrapped in 1974.

== History ==
Fond du Lac was launched 5 October 1944 by Oregon Shipbuilding Corp., Portland, Oregon; sponsored by Mrs. Giles French; acquired and commissioned 6 November 1944.

=== World War II ===
Fond du Lac sailed from San Francisco, California, 11 January 1945, laden with troops and cargo for Leyte Gulf, where she landed them as reinforcements 17 February. After training for the initial assault on Okinawa Gunto, Fond du Lac stood out of Leyte Gulf 27 March, landed troops and equipment on the assault beaches 1 to 5 April, and sailed with casualties for Guam. She continued to Pearl Harbor and San Francisco to reload, and brought her troops to the Philippines 10 June.

The attack transport transferred men from New Guinea to the Philippines before sailing 14 July 1945 for San Francisco. She returned to the Far East 22 September at Sasebo with U.S. Marine occupation troops, and after one voyage to the Philippines to bring additional occupation forces to Japan, sailed home from Guam with servicemen eligible for discharge. Fond du Lac voyaged to the Far East on transport duty again in December, then made her last voyage to Pearl Harbor the next month, sailing from San Francisco 8 February for Panama. Arrived at Panama Canal at 0800, 17 February 1946. 19 February 1946 shoved off at 0800 for Norfolk, Virginia.

=== Decommissioning and fate ===
There she was decommissioned 11 April 1946 and was struck from the U.S. Naval Register on 1 May 1946. Fond du Lac was finally sold for scrapping on 17 May 1974 to M. V. Intershitra, Netherlands.

== Awards ==
Fond du Lac received one battle star for World War II service.
