= USS Bollinger =

1944 Haskell-class attack transport

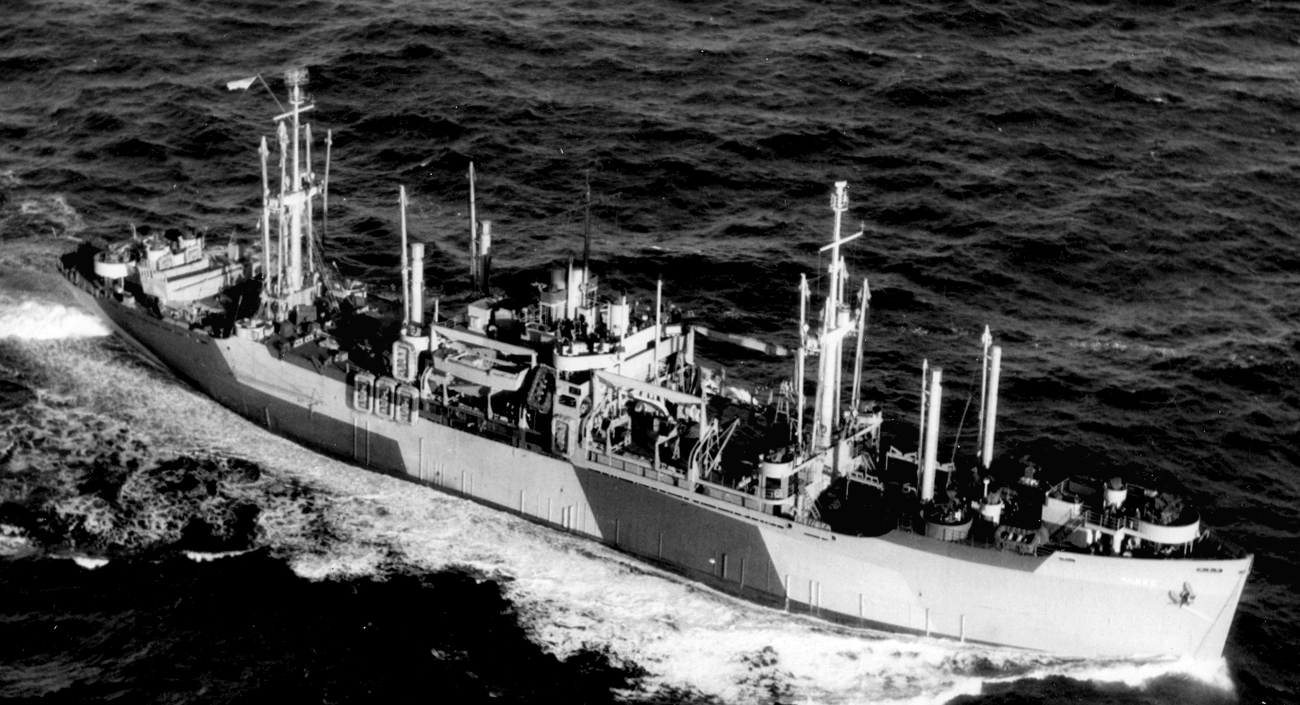

History

United States
- Name: USS Bollinger (APA-234)
- Namesake: Bollinger County, Missouri
- Builder: Kaiser Shipbuilding
- Laid down: 7 October 1944
- Launched: 19 November 1944
- Sponsored by: Mrs T. Mead
- Acquired: 8 December 1944
- Commissioned: 9 December 1944
- Decommissioned: 1 April 1947
- Reclassified: LPA-234, 1 January 1969
- Stricken: 22 May 1947
- Honours and awards: Two battle stars for World War II
- Fate: Scrapped in 1982

General characteristics
- Class & type: Haskell-class attack transport
- Displacement: 6,720 tons (lt), 14,837 t. (fl)
- Length: 455 ft
- Beam: 62 ft
- Draft: 24 ft
- Propulsion: 1 x Joshua Hendy geared turbine, 2 x Babcock & Wilcox header-type boilers, 1 x propeller, designed shaft horsepower 8,500
- Speed: 17.5 knots
- Boats & landing craft carried: 2 x LCM, 12 x LCVP, 3 x LCPU
- Capacity: 86 Officers 1,475 Enlisted
- Crew: 56 Officers, 480 enlisted
- Armament: 1 x 5"/38 caliber dual-purpose gun mount, 1 x quad 40mm gun mount, 4 x twin 40mm gun mounts, 10 x single 20mm gun mounts
- Notes: MCV Hull No. 680, hull type VC2-S-AP5

USS Bollinger (APA-234) was a Haskell-class attack transport in service with the United States Navy from 1944 to 1947. She was scrapped in 1982.

== History ==
Bollinger was named after Bollinger County, Missouri. She was launched 19 November 1944 by Kaiser Shipbuilding of Vancouver, Washington, under a Maritime Commission contract; transferred to the Navy 8 December, and commissioned the next day.

=== World War II ===
Bollinger joined the Pacific Fleet and arrived at Pearl Harbor 19 February 1945. She departed Pearl Harbor two days later for the invasion of Iwo Jima where she provided logistic support (6–16 March).

After returning to Pearl Harbor 5 April, she made a voyage to San Pedro, California, and back (22 April – 23 May), and then carried cargo and passengers to Eniwetok, Ulithi, Okinawa, Saipan, and Guam before returning to San Francisco on 29 July.

Leaving San Francisco 10 August she steamed to Eniwetok, Ulithi, and the Philippines before landing occupation troops at Wakayama, Honshū, Japan (12–26 September). She made one more voyage from the Philippines to Japan in October and then returned to San Diego, arriving 15 November. The transport made another voyage across the Pacific (December 1945 – January 1946) to bring men home from the Philippines.

=== Operation Crossroads ===
During June and July 1946 she carried passengers to Bikini Atoll for Operation Crossroads, the atomic bomb tests designed to test the effect of nuclear weapons on warships. Over 200 warships participated in this operation, 75 of them as targets.

=== Decommissioning and fate ===
Bollinger then returned to cross-Pacific service and was decommissioned at San Francisco 1 April 1947. She was returned to the Maritime Commission the following day, and laid up in the National Defense Reserve Fleet, Suisun Bay, California. While still in the Reserve Fleet, she was redesignated an amphibious transport LPA-234 on 1 January 1969. She was sold for scrapping by the MARAD on 19 February 1982.

== Awards ==
Bollinger received one battle star during World War II.
