= List of Victory ships (S) =

This is a list of Victory ships with names beginning with S.

== Description ==
A Victory ship was a cargo ship. The cargo ships were 455 feet 3 inches (138.76 m) overall, 436 feet 6 inches (133.05 m) between perpendiculars They had a beam of 62 feet 0 inches (18.90 m), a depth of 38 feet 0 inches (11.58 m) and a draught of 28 feet 0 inches (8.53 m). They were assessed at 7,612 GRT, 4,555 NRT and 10,750 DWT.

The ships were powered by a triple expansion steam engine, driving a steam turbine via double reduction gear. This gave the ship a speed of 15.5 knots (28.7 km/h) or 16.5 knots (30.6 km/h), depending on the machinery installed.

Liberty ships had five holds. No. 1 hold was 57 feet 6 inches (17.53 m) long, with a capacity of 81,715 cubic feet (2,313.9 m^{3}), No. 2 hold was 45 feet 0 inches (13.72 m) long, with a capacity of 89,370 cubic feet (2,531 m^{3}), No. 3 hold was 78 feet 0 inches (23.77 m) long, with a capacity of 158,000 cubic feet (4,500 m^{3}), No. 4 hold was 81 feet 0 inches (24.69 m) long, with a capacity of 89,370 cubic feet (2,531 m^{3}) and No. 5 hold was 75 feet 0 inches (22.86 m) long, with a capacity of 81,575 cubic feet (2,309.9 m^{3}).

In wartime service, they carried a crew of 62, plus 28 gunners. The ships carried four lifeboats. Two were powered, with a capacity of 27 people and two were unpowered, with a capacity of 29 people.

== Saginaw Victory ==
Saginaw Victory was built by Oregon Shipbuilding Corporation, Portland, Oregon. Her keel was laid on 7 November 1944. She was launched on 12 December and delivered on 9 February 1945. Built for the War Shipping Administration (WSA), she was operated under the management of Pacific-Atlantic Steamship Company. Laid up at Mobile, Alabama in 1949. Returned to service in 1949 under charter. Sold in 1951 to Pope & Talbot, Inc., San Francisco, California and renamed P. & T. Builder. Sold in 1962 to Sumner A. Long, New York and renamed Smith Builder. Sold in 1965 to Russell L. Steamship Corp., New York and renamed U.S. Builder. Sold in 1967 to A. E. C. Shipping Corp., New York. Sold in 1969 to Transpacific Container Services, Liberia and renamed Oriental Express. Converted to a container ship by Hong Kong & Whampoa Drydock Co., Hong Kong in November 1969. Now 7,456 GRT. She was scrapped at Kaohsiung, Taiwan in 1976.

== Saint Croix ==
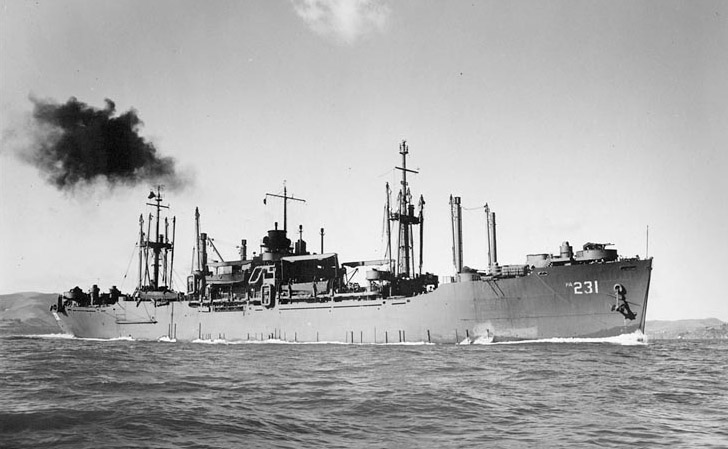
USS Saint Croix

Saint Croix was a troop transport built by Kaiser Company, Vancouver, Washington. Her keel was laid on 25 September 1944.She was launched on 9 November and delivered on 1 December. Built for the United States Navy. To the United States Maritime Commission (USMC) in 1947. Laid up in Suisun Bay. She was scrapped in 1979.

== Salina Victory ==
Salina Victory was built by Permanente Metals Corporation, Richmond, California. Her keel was laid on 23 September 1944. She was launched on 24 November and delivered on 16 December. Built for the WSA, she was operated under the management of Matson Navigation Company. Sold in 1946 to N.V. Stoomvaart Maatschappij Oceaan, Amsterdam, Netherlands and renamed Polydorus. Sold in 1960 to Ocean Steam Ship Company, Liverpool, United Kingdom and renamed Talthybius. Operated under the management of A. Hold & Co. She was scrapped at Kaohsiung in December 1971.

== San Angelo Victory ==
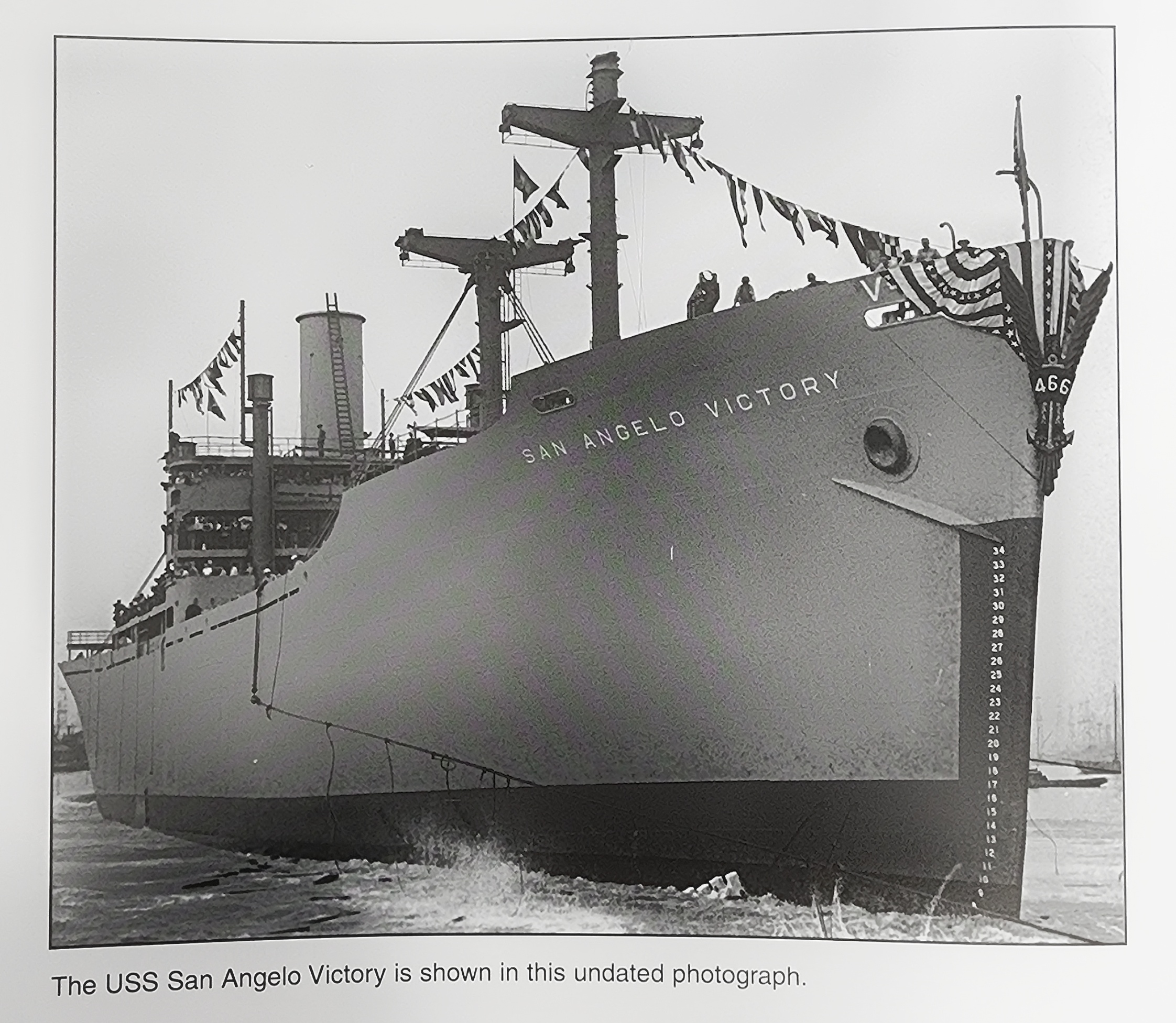
San Angelo Victory

San Angelo Victory was built by California Shipbuilding Corporation, Terminal Island, Los Angeles, California. Her keel was laid on 13 July 1945. She was launched on 20 September and delivered on 20 October. Built for the WSA, she was operated under the management of Alcoa Steamship Company. Laid up in Suisun Bay in 1948. Sold in 1950 to Seatrade Corporation, Delaware, New York. She caught fire at Bremerhaven, West Germany on 28 December 1951. Sold in 1952 to Prudential Steamship Corporation, New York. To Prudential Lines Inc., New York in 1963. To the United States Department of Commerce in 1965, leased back to Prudential Lines Inc. Sold in 1966 to Shamrock Steamship Corp., Wilmington, Delaware and renamed Helen D. Sold in 1967 to Columbia Steamship Corp., Wilmington, Delaware and renamed Columbia Banker. She was scrapped at Kaohsiung in November 1971.

== Sanborn ==
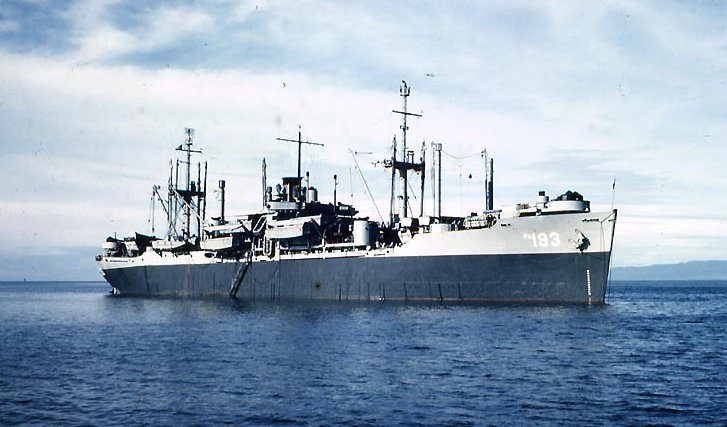
USS Sanborn

Sanborn was built by Kaiser Company. Her keel was laid on 10 March 1944. She was launched on 19 August and delivered on 3 October. Built for the United States Navy. Decommissioned in 1946. Recommissioned in 1951 due to the Korean War. Decommissioned in 1956. Laid up in reserve at Orange, Texas. To the United States Maritime Administration in 1961. Laid up at Mobile. She was sold for scrapping at Panama City, Florida in October 1971.

== Sandoval ==
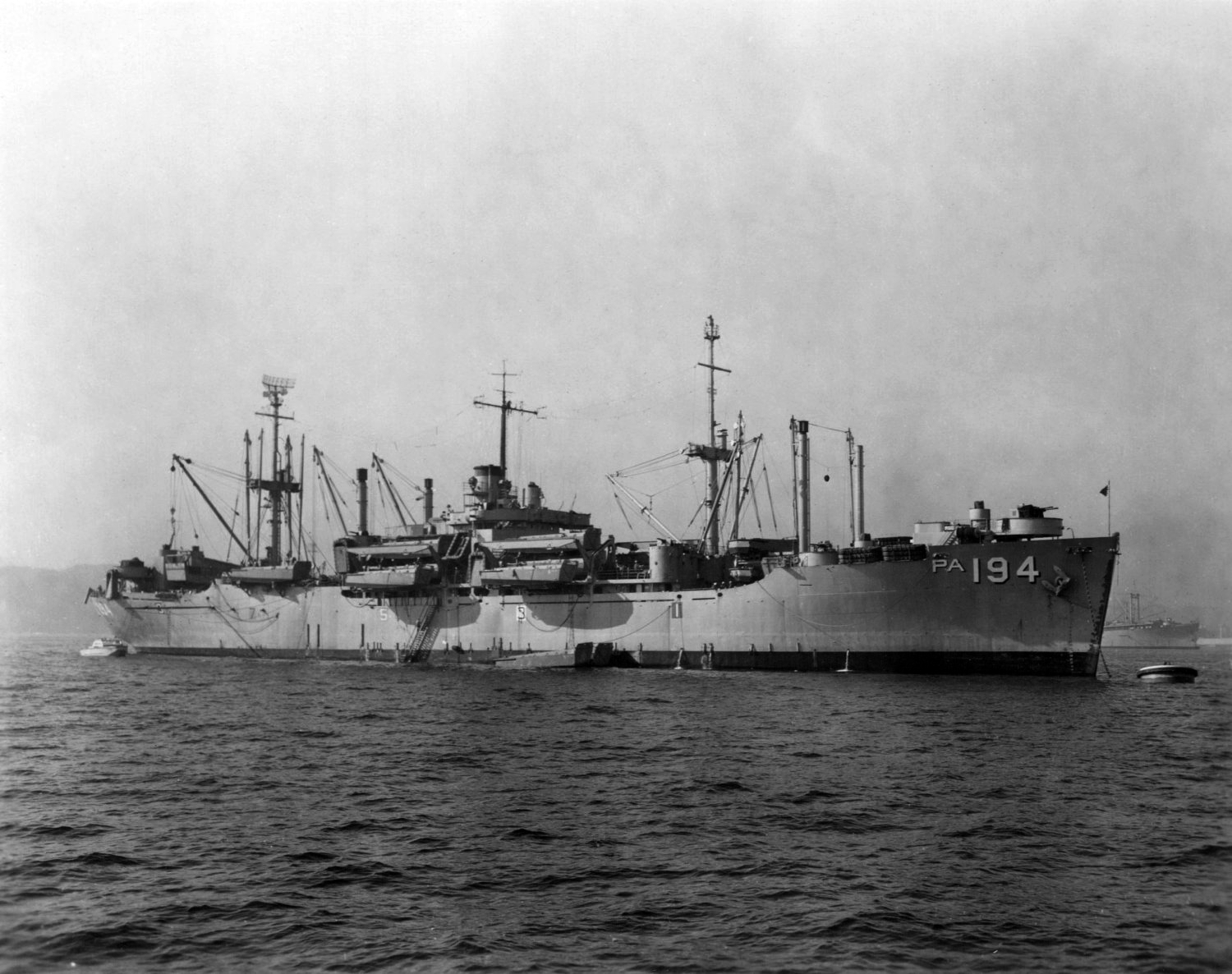
USS Sandoval

Sandova was built by Kaiser Company. Her keel was laid on 16 May 1944. She was launched on 2 September and delivered on 7 October. Built for the United States Navy. Decommissioned at Stockton, California in 1946. Recommissioned in 1951 due to the Korean War. Decommissioned at Mare Island Navy Yard, Vallejo, California in 1955, placed in reserve. To the United States Maritime Administration in 1961. Laid up in Suisun Bay. Recommissioned in 1961. Stricken in 1970 and laid up in the James River. She was sold for scrapping to Isaac Varela Davalillo, Spain on 1 August 1983 and had been scrapped in Spain by 30 December.

== San Mateo Victory ==
San Mateo Victory was built by Permanente Metals. Her keel was laid on 19 May 1945. She was launched on 30 June and delivered on 4 August. Built for the WSA, she was operated under the management of American President Lines. Laid up in Suisun Bay in 1948. Returned to service in 1966 due to the Vietnam War. Operated under the joint management of Lykes Brothers Steamship Company and States Steamship Company. Laid up at Beaumont, Texas in 1973. She was scrapped at Tuxpan, Mexico in 1994.

== San Saba ==
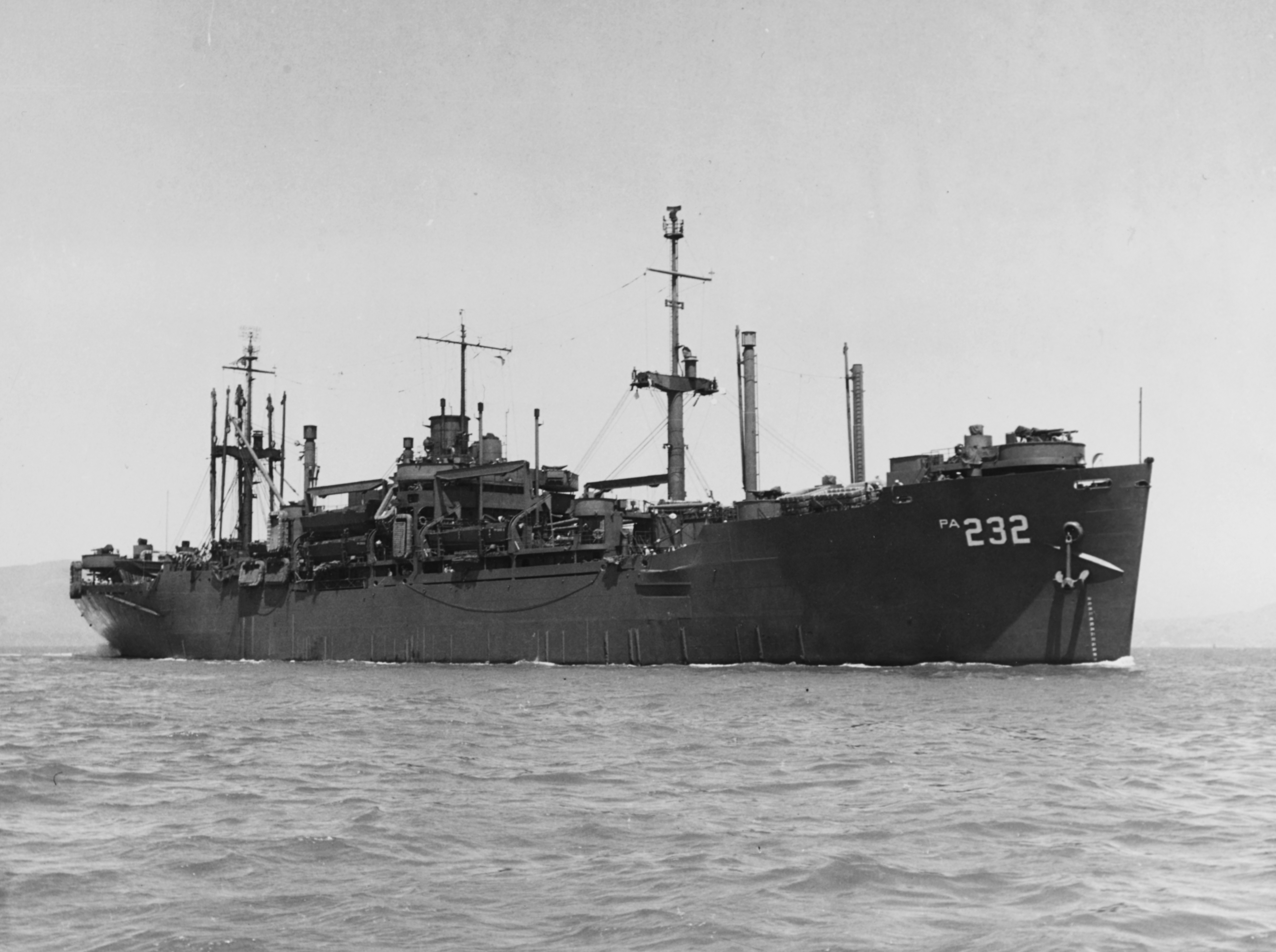
USS San Saba

San Saba was built by Kaiser Company. Her keel was laid on 29 September 1944. She was launched on 12 November and delivered on 3 December. Built for the United States Navy. Decommissioned in 1946. To the United States Maritime Administration in 1959. Laid up in Suisun Bay. She was scrapped in the United States in 1975.

== Santa Clara Victory ==
Santa Clara Victory was built by California Shipbuilding Corporation. Her keel was laid on 16 January 1945. She was launched on 9 March and delivered on 3 April. Built for the WSA, she was operated under the management of General Steamship Company. Laid up at Mobile in 1953. Returned to service in 1966 due to the Vietnam War. Operated under the management of Pacific Far East Line. Laid up in the James River in 1973. She was scrapped at Castellón de la Plana, Spain in 1985.

== Sapulpa Victory ==
Sapulpa Victory was built by California Shipbuilding Corporation. Her keel was laid on 26 February 1945. She was launched on 29 April and delivered on 19 June. Built for the WSA, she was operated under the management of Alcoa Steamship Company. Laid up at Beaumont in 1948. Later transferred to the James River. Sold in 1963 to Halcyon Steamship Company, New York and renamed Halcyon Panther. She was scrapped at Kaohsiung in January 1972.

== Sarasota ==
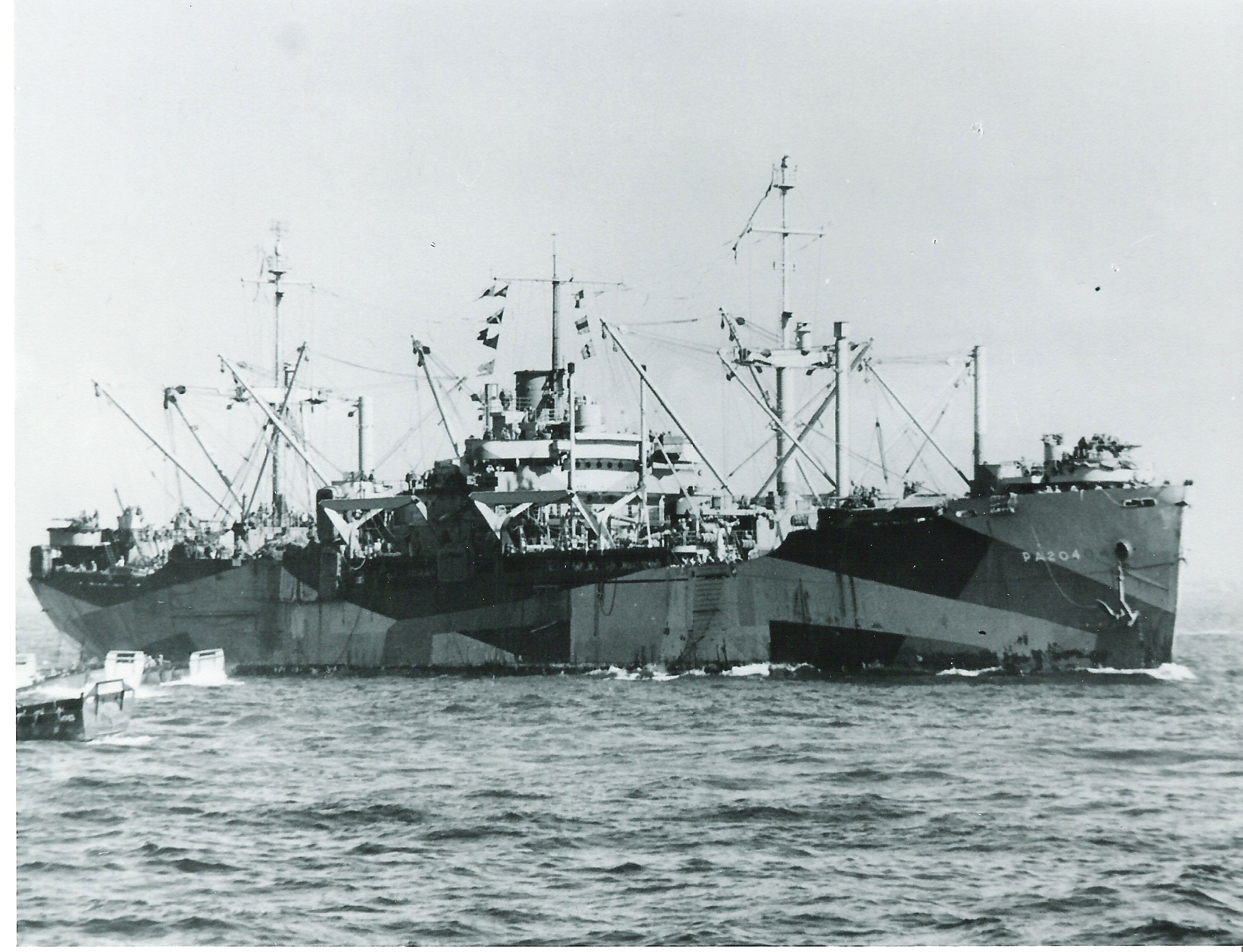
USS Sarasota

Sarasota was built by Permanente Metals Corporation. Her keel was laid on 11 April 1944. She was launched on 14 June and delivered on 16 August. Built for the United States Navy. Decommissioned at Stockton in 1946. Recommissioned in 1951 due to the Korean War. Decommissioned in 1955. Laid up in reserve in the James River. To the United States Maritime Administration in 1961. She was scrapped in Spain in 1981.

== Sedalia Victory ==
Sedalia Victory was built by Bethlehem Fairfield Shipyard, Baltimore, Maryland. Her keel was laid on 20 November 1944. She was launched on 11 January 1945 and delivered on 1 February. Built for the WSA, she was operated under the management of United Fruit Company. Laid up in Suisun Bay in 1947. She was scrapped at Portland, Oregon in 1975.

== Selma Victory ==
Selma Victory was built by California Shipbuilding Corporation. Her keel was laid on 23 April 1944. She was launched on 16 June and delivered on 29 July. Built for the WSA, she was operated under the management of Luckenbach Steamship Co., Inc. Laid up at Wilmington, North Carolina in 1950. Later transferred to the James River. She was scrapped at Alang, India in 1994.

== Seton Hall Victory ==
Seton Hall Victory was built by Oregon Shipbuilding Corporation. Her keel was laid on 10 April 1945. She was launched on 22 May and delivered on 21 June. Built for the WSA, she was operated under the management of Olympic Steamship Company. Laid up at Wilmington, North Carolina in 1948. Subsequently returned to service with Olympic Steamship Company and Pope & Talbot, Inc. Laid up at Mobile in 1950. Returned to service in 1956. Laid up in the James River in 1957. To the United States Navy in 1962. Operated by the Military Sea Transportation Service. Converted to a Missile Range Instrumentation Ship by Boland Machinery & Manufacturing Co., New Orleans, Louisiana in 1962 and renamed Wheeling. She was sunk as a target ship off Point Mugu, California in 1981.

== Sevier ==
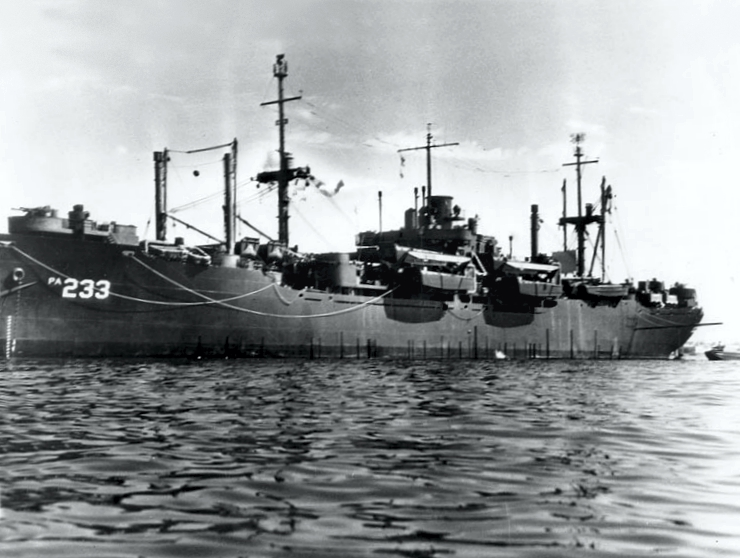
USS Sevier

Sevier was built by Kaiser Company. Her keel was laid on 4 October 1944. She was launched on 16 November and delivered on 5 December. Built for the United States Navy. To the USMC in 1947. Laid up in Suisun Bay. She was scrapped in 1980.

== Sharon Victory ==
Sharon Victory was built by California Shipbuilding Corporation. Her keel was laid on 15 April 1945. She was launched on 24 June and delivered on 28 September. Built for the WSA, she was operated under the management of Grace Line Inc. Laid up at Mobile in 1948. Later transferred to the James River. She was scrapped at Kaohsiung in 1988.

== Sheepshead Bay Victory ==
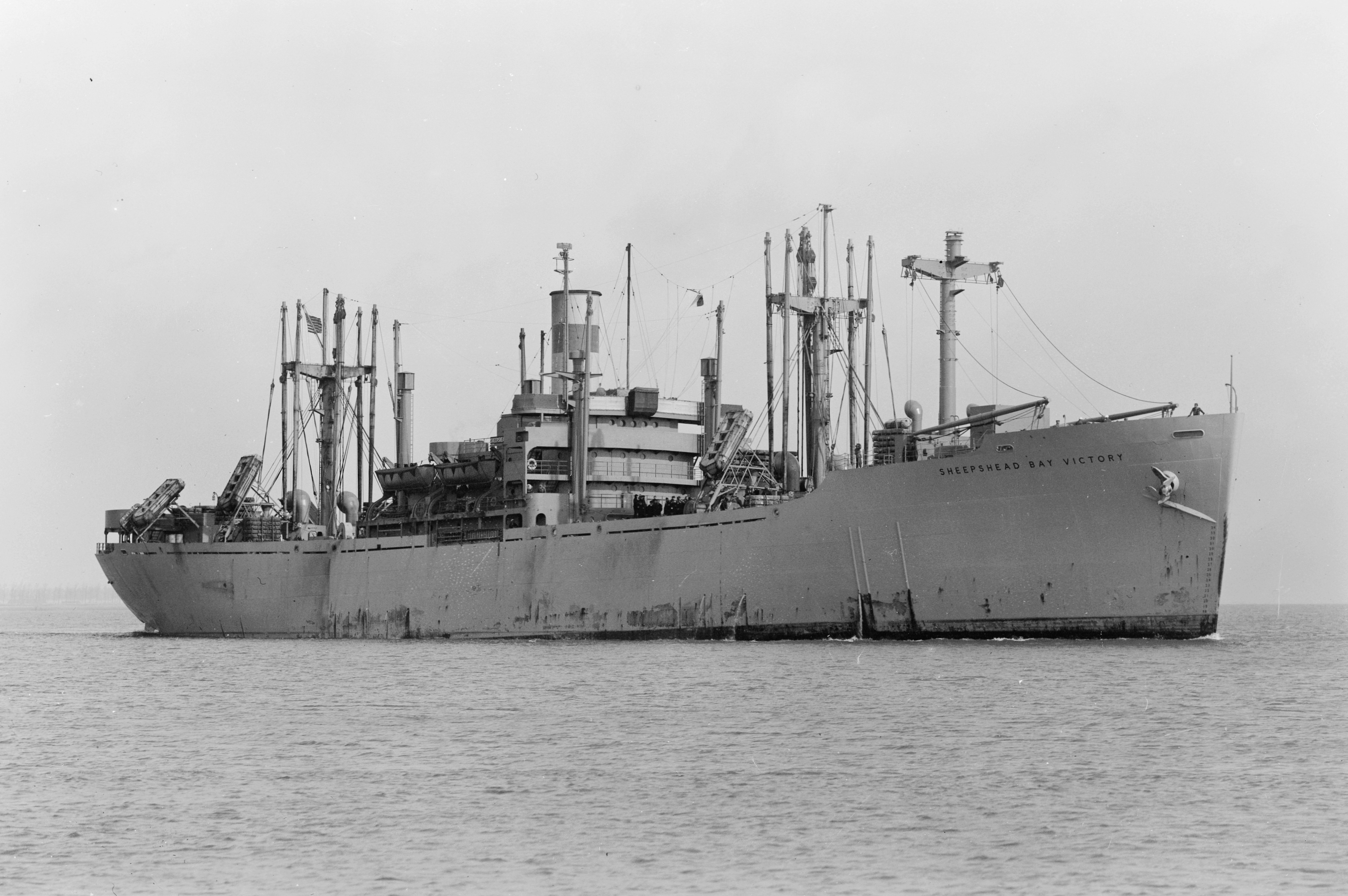
Sheepshead Bay Victory

Sheepshead Bay Victory was built a troop transport by Bethlehem Fairfield Shipyard. Her keel was laid on 4 May 1945. She was launched on 13 June and delivered on 13 July. Built for the WSA, she was operated under the management of American-Hawaiian Steamship Company. Laid up in Suisun Bay in 1946. Sold to Stanhope Steamship Co., London, United Kingdom and renamed Stanholme. Sold later that year to Peninsular & Oriental Steam Navigation Company, London and renamed Karmala. She was scrapped at Kaohsiung in August 1967.

== Sherburne ==
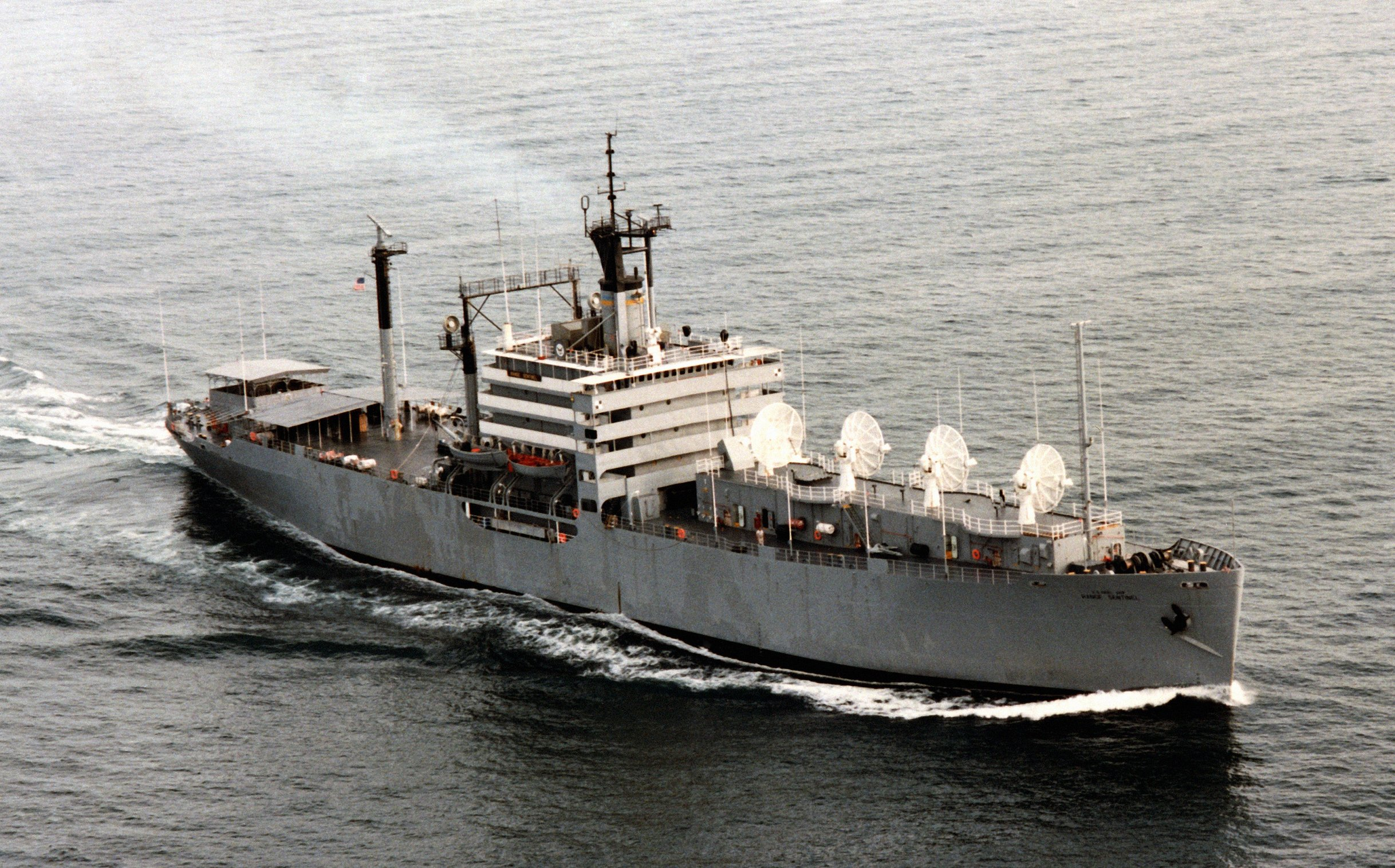
USNS Range Sentinel

Sherburne was built by Permanente Metals Corporation. Her keel was laid on 18 May 1944. She was launched on 10 July and delivered on 20 September. Built for the United States Navy. Decommissioned in 1946. To USMC in 1959 and laid up in Suisun Bay. To the United States Navy in May 1969. Converted to a Range Instrumentation Ship by Northwest Marine Iron Works, Portland, Oregon. Entered service as Range Sentinel in September 1971. Operated by Military Sea Transportation Service. Laid up in the James River in 2001. She was scrapped at Sparrow's Point, Maryland in November 2012.

== Sibley ==
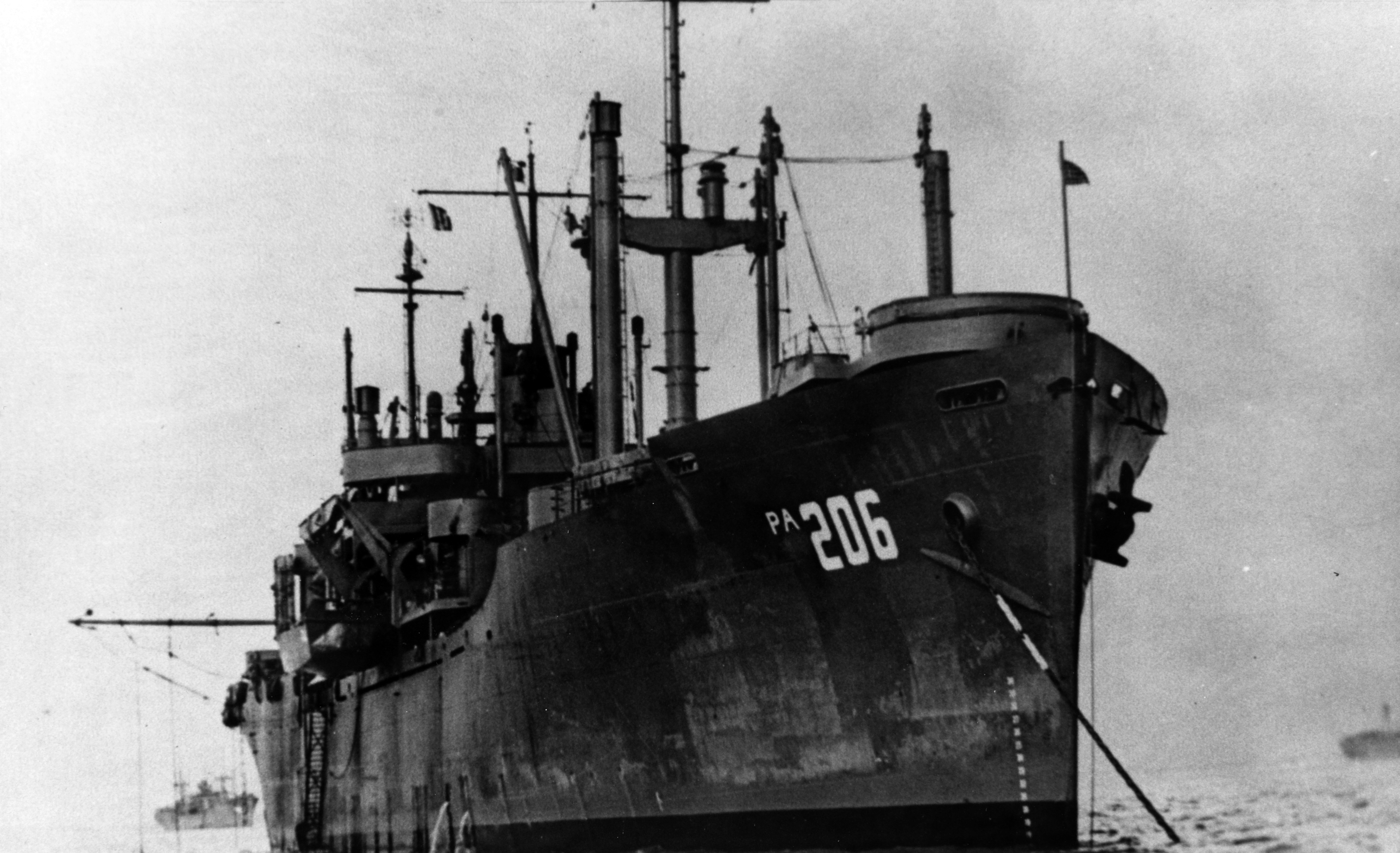
USS Sibley

Sibley was built by Permanente Metals Corporation. Her keel was laid on 17 May 1944. She was launched on 19 July and delivered on 2 October. Built for the United States Navy. Decommissioned in 1946. Laid up in reserve at Stockton. To United States Maritime Administration in 1959. Laid up in Suisun Bay. She was scrapped in the United States in 1975.

== Silverbow Victory ==
Silverbow Victory was built by Oregon Shipbuilding Corporation. Her keel was laid on 14 April 1944. She was launched on 23 May and delivered on 15 June. Built for the WSA, she was operated under the management of Weyerhaeuser Steamship Company. Sold in 1947 to Permanente Cement Co., Portland, Oregon and renamed Permanente Silverbow. Converted to a bulk carrier in September 1947 by Kaiser & Co, Portland, Oregon. Sold in 1972 to Panamericana Insurgentes S.A., Panama and renamed Florida Silverbow. Sold in 1978 to Corment Carriers S.A., Panama. Sold in 1984 to Galeana S.A., Panama. She was scrapped at Brownsville, Texas in 1985.

== Simmons Victory ==
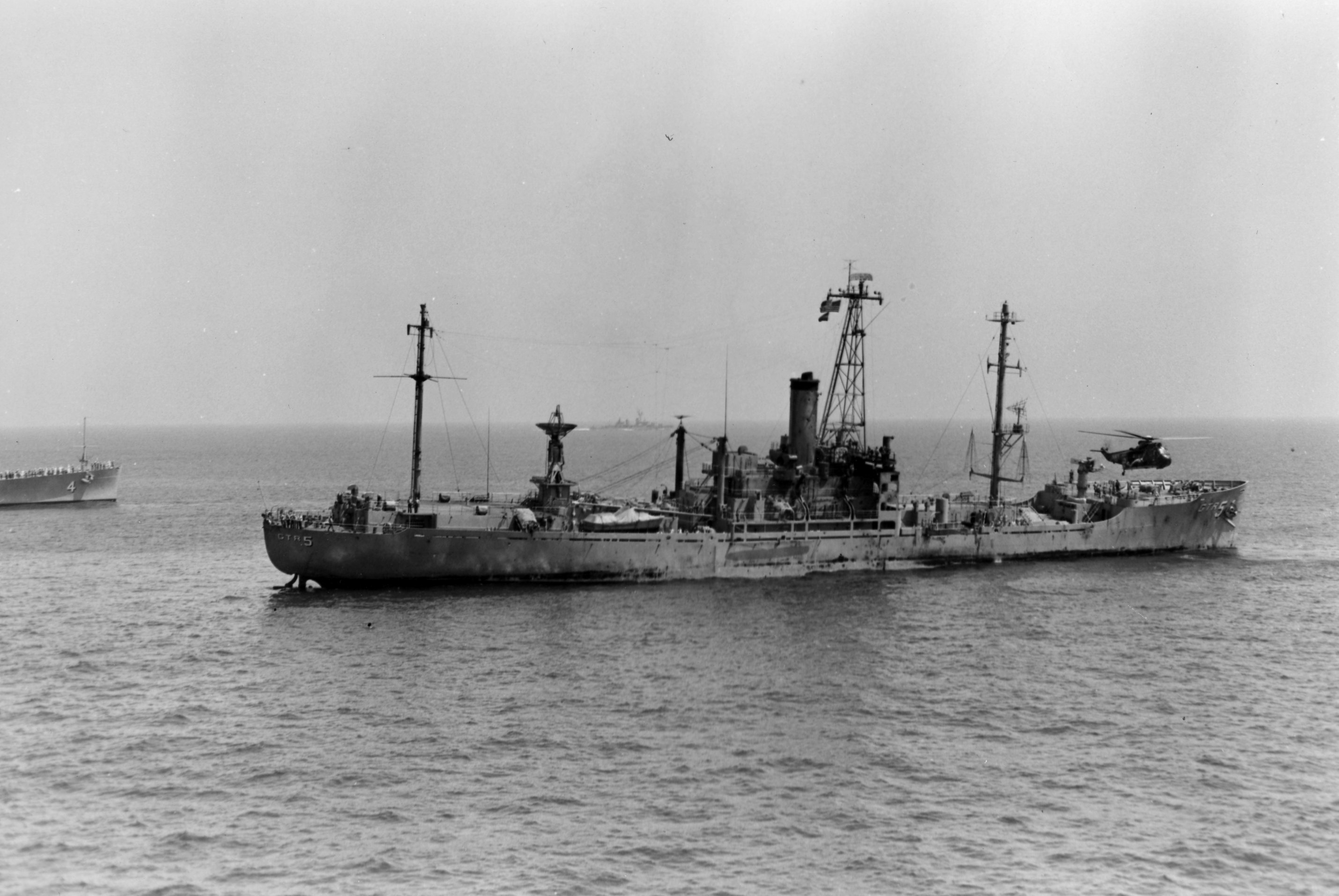
USS Liberty

Simmons Victory was built by Oregon Shipbuilding Corporation. Her keel was laid on 23 February 1945. She was launched on 6 April and delivered on 4 May. Built for the WSA, she was operated under the management of Coastwise Line. Laid up in Suisun Bay in 1948. Returned to service in 1957. Laid up at Olympia, Washington in 1958. To the United States Navy in 1964. Converted to a research ship by Willamette Iron and Steel Company, Portland, Oregon. She was attacked by Israeli forces during the Six-Day War on 8 June 1967 and was severely damaged. She arrived at Malta on 14 June for temporary repairs. Laid up on return to the United States, she was sold for scrapping at Boston, Massachusetts in November 1970.

== Sioux Falls Victory ==
Sioux Falls Victory was built by California Shipbuilding Corporation. Her keel was laid on 29 October 1944. She was launched on 19 December and delivered on 25 January 1945. Built for the WSA, she was operated under the management of American-Hawaiian Steamship Company. Laid up at Astoria in 1947. Returned to service in 1966 due to the Vietnam War. Operated under the management of Alaska Steamship Company. Laid up in Suisun Bay in 1973. She was sold for scrapping at Brownsville in 2006.

== Skagway Victory ==
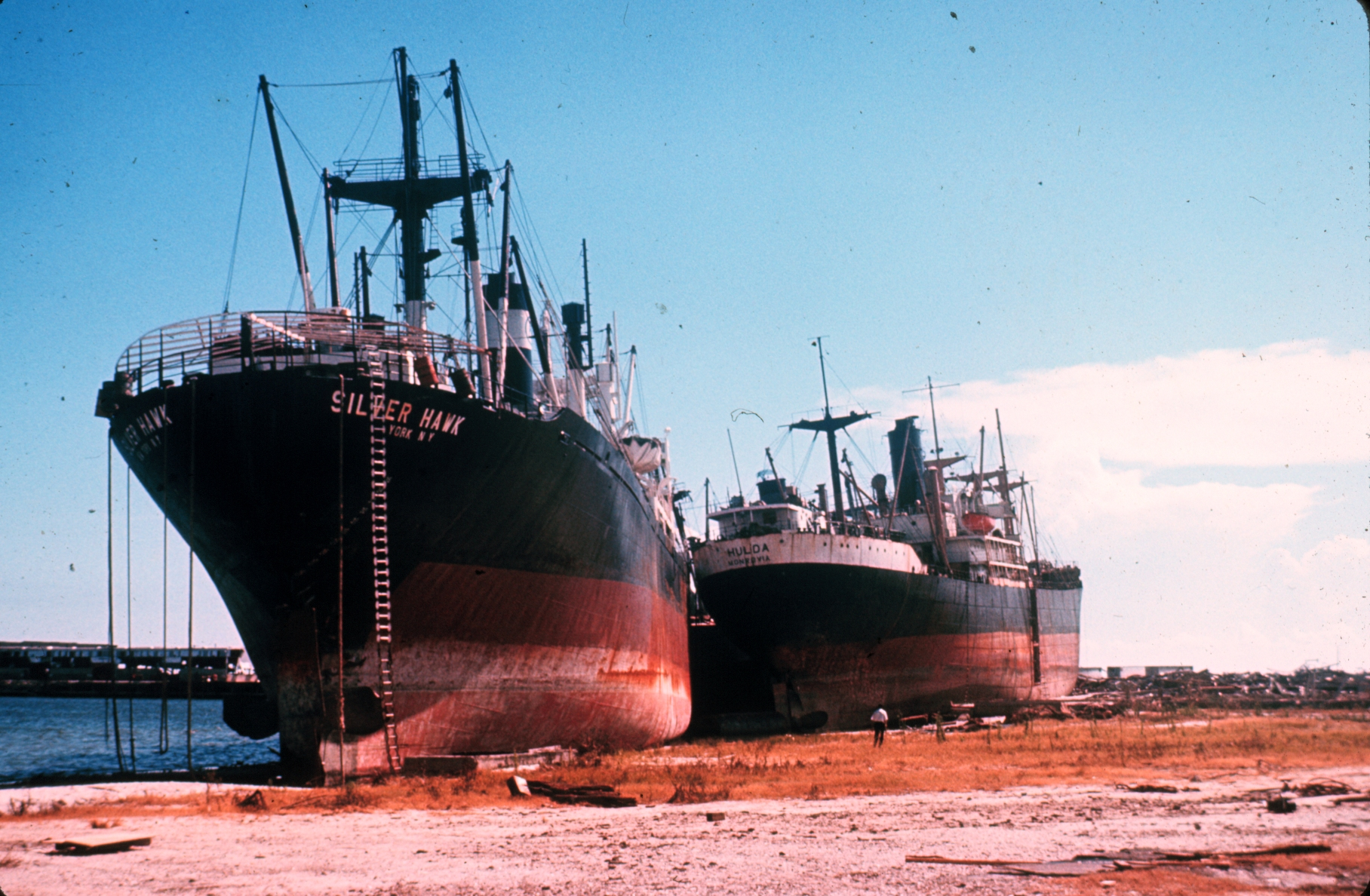
Silver Hawk and Hulda.

Skagway Victory was built by Oregon Shipbuilding Corporation. Her keel was laid on 12 May 1944. She was launched on 21 June and delivered on 15 July. Built for the WSA, she was operated under the management of Alcoa Steamship Company. Sold in 1949 to States Marine Corp., Wilmington, Delaware and renamed Constitution State. To States Marine Lines in 1960. Sold in 1969 to Oneida Steamship Co., New York and renamed Silver Hawk. She was driven ashore by Hurricane Camille at Gulfport, Mississippi on 18 August 1969. Run into by the steamship Hulda and the Victory ship Alamo Victory and severely damaged. Declared a constructive total loss, she was scrapped in situ in April 1970.

== Skidmore Victory ==
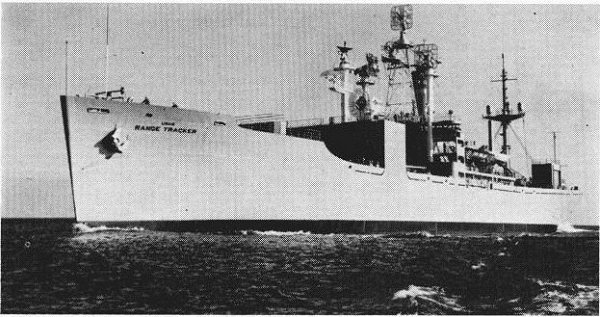
USNS Range Tracker

Skidmore Victory was built by Oregon Shipbuilding Corporation. Her keel was laid on 6 April 1945. She was launched on 19 May and delivered on 18 June. Built for the WSA, she was operated under the management of Northland Transportation Company. Sold in 1948 to American President Lines and renamed President Buchanan. To the United States Department of Commerce in 1958 and renamed Skidmore Victory. Laid up in Suisun Bay. To the Military Sea Transportation Service in 1960. Converted to a Special Project Ship by Ingalls Shipbuilding Corp., Pascagoula, Mississippi. To the United States Navy in 1961, renamed Range Tracker. To the USMC in 1969. Laid up in Suisun Bay. She was scrapped at Portland, Oregon in July 1971.

== Smith Victory ==
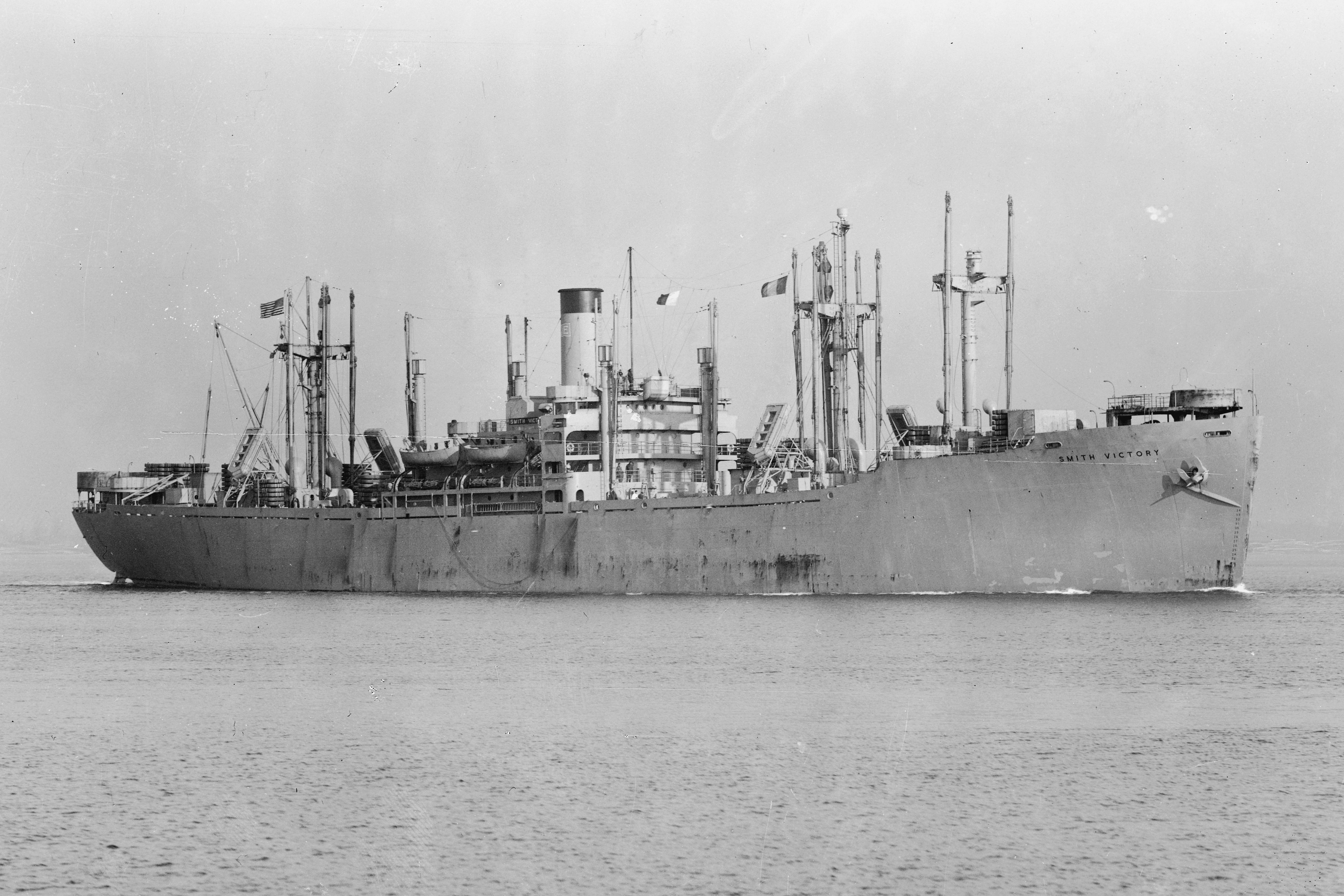
Smith Victory

Smith Victory was a troop transport built by Bethlehem Fairfield Shipyard. Her keel was laid on 11 April 1945. She was launched on 24 May and delivered on 22 June. Built for the WSA, she was operated under the management of Eastern Steamship Co. Laid up in the Hudson River in 1946. Sold in 1947 to Compania Argentina de Navigation Dodero, Buenos Aires, Argentina and renamed Buenos Aires. Sold in 1949 to Flota Argentina de Navigation de Ultramar, Buenos Aires. Rebuilt in 1955 to include accommodation for passengers. Sold in 1961 to Empresa Lineas Maritimas, Buenos Aires. Sold in 1963 to Fairwind Shipping Corp., Liberia and renamed Fairwind. She ran aground off Grand Bahama, Bahamas (27°12′N 77°16′W) on 11 February 1968 whilst on a voyage from a West African port to New Orleans. She was refloated on 24 February and towed to Jacksonville, Florida. Declared a constructive total loss, she was towed to Bilbao, Spain in July and scrapped in October 1968.

== South Africa Victory ==
South Africa Victory was built by Oregon Shipbuilding Corporation. Her keel was laid on 2 February 1944. She was launched on 11 April and delivered on 4 May. Built for the WSA, she was operated under the management of American South African Line. Sold in 1949 to States Marine Corp. and renamed Beaver State. To States Marine Lines in 1960. Sold in 1968 to Geneva Steamship Corp., New York and renamed Silver Eagle. Sold in 1970 to West Pacific Steamship Co., Panama and renamed Paceagle. She was scrapped at Kaohsiung in December 1971.

== South Bend Victory ==
South Bend Victory was built by Oregon Shipbuilding Corporation. Her keel was laid on 11 May 1945. She was launched on 30 June and delivered on 27 July. Built for the WSA, she was operated under the management of Waterman Steamship Company. Laid up in the James River in 1953. To the United States Navy in 1957. Converted for naval use at Charleston Navy Yard, Charleston, South Carolina. Laid up at Beaumont in 1987. She was scrapped at Kaohsiung in 1988.

== Southwestern Victory ==
Southwestern Victory was built by California Shipbuilding Corporation. Her keel was laid on 6 March 1945. She was launched on 30 April and delivered on 23 May. Built for the WSA, she was operated under the management of De La Rama Steamship Company, Inc. Laid up at Wilmington, North Carolina in 1948. Later transferred to the James River. She was scrapped at Alang in 1996.

== Spartanberg Victory ==
Spartanberg Victory was built by Bethlehem Fairfield Shipyard. Her keel was laid on 18 June 1945. She was launched on 6 August and delivered on 17 September. Built for the WSA, she was operated under the management of Eastern Steamship Co. Laid up at Beaumont in 1948. Sold in 1950 to Bloomfield Steamship Co., Houston, Texas. Renamed Neva West in 1951. Sold in 1957 to States Marine Lines Inc. and renamed Cotton State. She was scapped at Kaohsiung in May 1970.

== St. Albans Victory ==
St. Albans Victory was a troop transport built by Bethlehem Fairfield Shipyard. Her keel was laid on 20 July 1944. She was launched on 5 October and delivered on 9 November. Built for the WSA, she was operated under the management of American West African Lines. Laid up in the James River in 1947. Sold in 1949 to China Union Lines, Shanghai, China and renamed Shanghai Victory. Later reflagged to Taiwan. Sold in 1951 to Argosy Steamship Co., Panama and renamed Hafez. Sold in 1953 to Korea Shipping Corp., Republic of Korea and renamed Nam Hae Ho. Renamed Namhae in 1954. She ran aground at Pusan, South Korea on 18 December 1972 whilst on a voyage from Ulsan, South Korea to Saigon, Vietnam. She broke her back, and was declared a constructive total loss.

== St. Augustine Victory ==
St. Augustine Victory was built by Bethlehem Fairfield Shipyard. Her keel was laid on 3 July 1945. She was launched on 7 September and delivered on 29 September. Built for the WSA, she was operated under the management of United States Navigation Company. Laid up at Beaumont in 1950. Returned to service in 1966 due to the Vietnam War. Operated under the management of Matson Navigation Co. Laid up in the James River in 1973. She was scrapped in 1993.

== St. Cloud Victory ==
St. Cloud Victory was built by Oregon Shipbuilding Corporation. Her keel was laid on 30 November 1944. She was launched on 5 January 1945 and delivered on 19 February. Built for the WSA, she was operated under the management of McCormick Steamship Company. Sold in 1949 to Pope & Talbot, Inc. and renamed P. & T. Adventurer. Sold in 1962 to Sumner A. Long and renamed Smith Adventurer. Renamed U.S. Adventurer in 1965. Sold in 1967 to Merchant Mariners Inc., New York. Sold later that year to A. E. C. Shipping Corp. Renamed Oriental Zephyr. She was scrapped at Kaohsiung in February 1970.

== St. John's Victory ==
St. John's Victory was built by Permanente Metals Corporation. Her keel was laid on 14 March 1945. She was launched on 19 April and delivered on 30 May. Built for the WSA, she was operated under the management of American-Hawaiian Steamship Company. Laid up at Beaumont in 1948. Sold in 1951 to Bloomfield Steamship Co. and renamed Genevieve Peterkin. Renamed Alice Brown in 1957. Sold later that year to States Steamship Company and renamed Volunteer State. To States Marine Lines in 1960. Sold in 1970 to Reliance Carriers S.A., Panama and renamed Reliance Fraternity. She was scrapped at Kaohsiung in April 1971.

== St. Lawrence Victory ==
St. Lawrence Victory was built by Permanente Metals Corporation. Her keel was laid on 25 January 1945. She was launched on 7 March and delivered on 31 May. Built for the WSA, she was operated under the management of Agwilines Inc. She struck a mine 8 nautical miles (15 km) off Dubrovnik, Yugoslavia on 25 March 1947 and was beached off Korcula. Later refloated and towed in the Split. Claimed by Yugoslav authorities under maritime salvage laws and officially abandoned as a constructive total loss by the WSA. To Jugoslavenska Slobodna Plovidba in 1948. Re-engined and rebuilt as a passenger ship. Renamed Zagreb. Sold later that year to Jugoslavenska Linijska Plovidba, Rieka, Yugoslavia and renamed Hrvatska. She collided with the Italian tanker Fina Italia 200 nautical miles (370 km) off New York on 14 October 1961. Sold in 1967 to Adab S.A., Geneva, Switzerland. Operated under the management of Dabinovic S.A. and reflagged to Burundi. Sold in 1967 to Compania Navigation Adriatica Ltda., San José, Costa Rica. Sold in 1968 to Sociètè D'Avances Commerciales S.A. and renamed Armelle. Reflagged to Somalia. Sold in 1971 to Sociètè de Gerance et de Transports Maritimes, Mogadishu, Somalia. She arrived at Bilbao for scrapping in September 1972, and was scrapped in 1973.

== St. Mary's ==
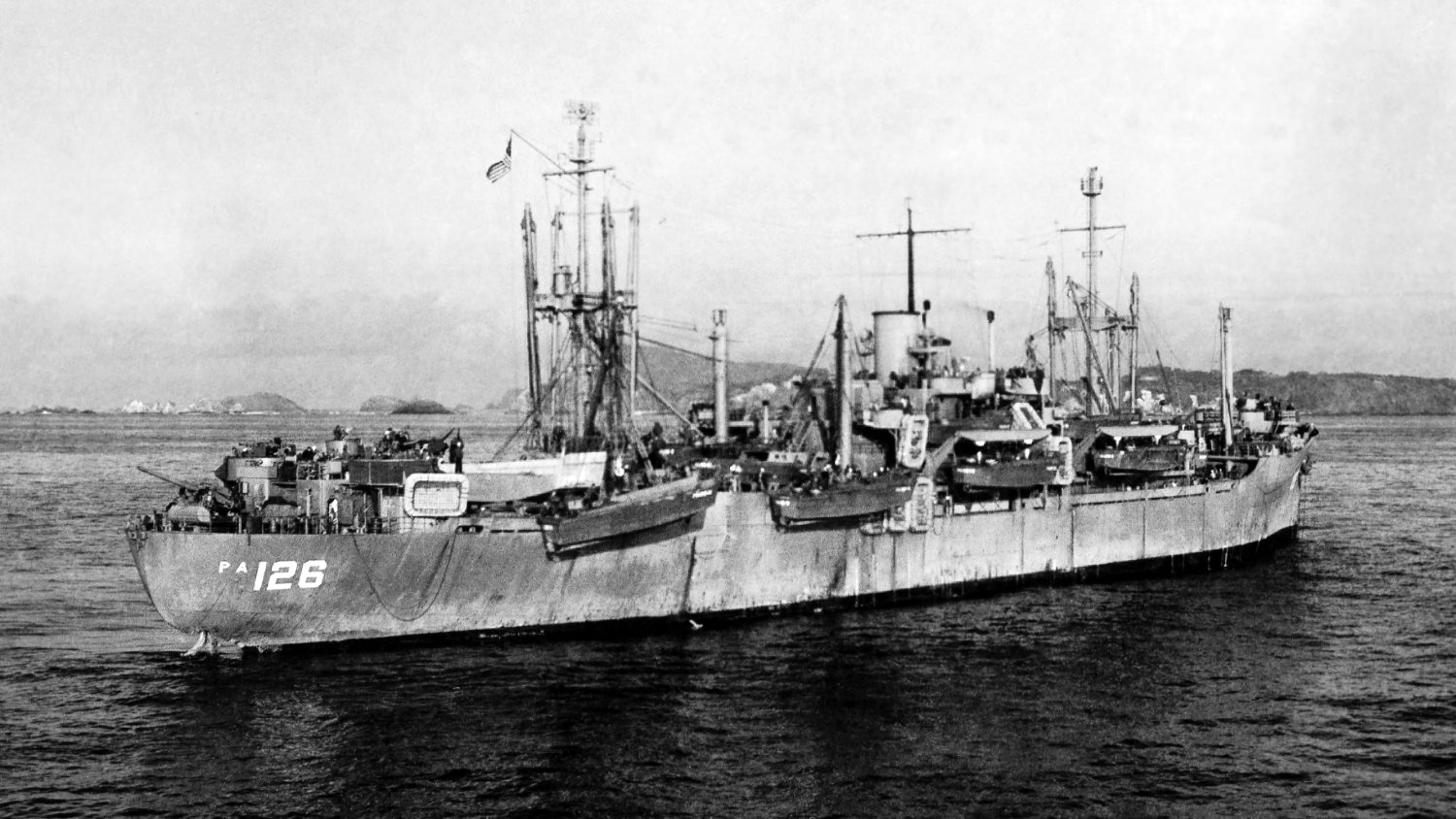
USS St. Mary's

St. Mary's was built by California Shipbuilding Corporation. Her keel was laid on 16 June 1944. She was launched on 1 August and delivered on 27 September. Built for the United States Navy. To the USMC in 1946 and laid up in Suisun Bay. She was scrapped in the United States in 1976.

== Stamford Victory ==
Stamford Victory was a troop transport built by Bethlehem Fairfield Shipyard. Her keel was laid on 20 January 1945. She was launched on 12 March and delivered on 7 April. Built for the WSA, she was operated under the management of American Foreign Steamship Company. To the Ministry of Transport, London in 1946. Operated under the management of Furness, Withy & Co., London Sold in 1948 to Rio Cape Line and renamed British Prince, remaining under the same management. Sold to her managers in 1954. Chartered to T. & J. Brocklebank in 1957 and renamed Mandagala. Sold in 1960 to Orient Mid-East Great Lakes Services, Piraeus, Greece and renamed Orient Trader. She caught fire at Toronto, Canada on 21 July 1965 and was severely damaged. Declared a constructive total loss, she was sold in December 1965 to Canadian buyers who initially intended to have her repaired, but subsequently intended to have her scrapped in Panama. Neither scenario came to fruition. She was sold to Spanish shipbreakers. Towed to Valencia by the Portuguese tug Praia da Adraga, she was scrapped in July 1966.

== Stetson Victory ==
Stetson Victory was a troop transport built by Bethlehem Fairfield Shipyard. Her keel was laid on 3 May 1945. She was launched on 16 June and delivered on 18 July. Built for the WSA, she was operated under the management of Isbrandtsen Steamship Company. To the United States Army Transportation Corps in 1947 and renamed Sgt. Sylvester Antolak. Laid up in Suisun Bay in 1949. To the United States Navy in 1950. Operated by the Military Sea Transportation Service. To the United States Department of Commerce in 1952. Laid up at Olympia. Sold to shipbreakers in Seattle, Washington for non-transportation use. She was scrapped at Seattle in 1973.

== Stevens Victory ==
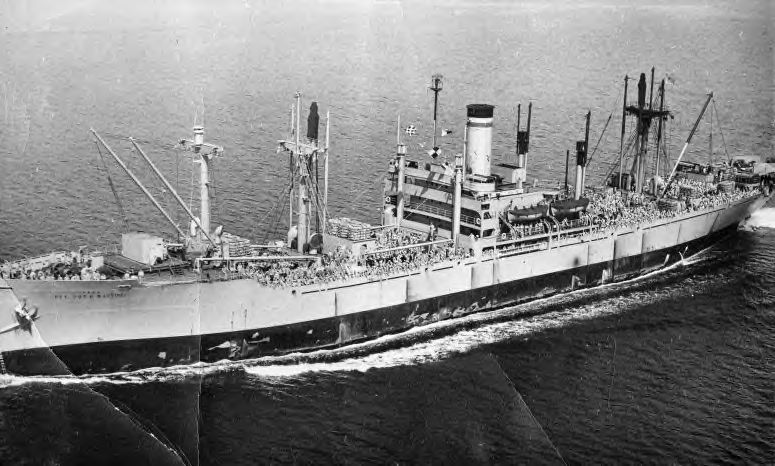
USS Pvt. Joe P. Martinez

Stevens Victory was a troop transport built by Bethlehem Fairfield Shipyard. Her keel was laid on 13 April 1945. She was launched on 29 May and delivered on 25 June. Built for the WSA, she was operated under the management of Grace Line Inc. To the United States Army Transportation Corps in 1947 and renamed Pvt. Joe P. Martinez. To the United States Navy in 1950. Operated by the Military Sea Transportation Service. To the United States Department of Commerce in 1952. Laid up at Olympia. Sold in 1971 to West Waterway Lumber Co., Seattle for non-transportation use. She was scrapped at Seattle in 1973.

== Swarthmore Victory ==
Swarthmore Victory was built by Permanente Metals Corporation. Her keel was laid on 31 January 1945. She was launched on 14 March and delivered on 7 April. Built for the WSA, she was operated under the management of United States Lines. Laid up at Astoria in 1950. Returned to service in 1966 due to the Vietnam War. Operated under the management of Pacific Far East Line. Laid up in Suisun Bay in 1973. She was scrapped at Kaohsiung in 1988.
