= Codington =

Codington may refer to:

- Codington County, South Dakota
- USS Codington (AK-173)
