= SS Leland Stanford =

World War II Liberty ship of the United States

History

United States
- Name: Leland Stanford
- Namesake: Leland Stanford
- Owner: War Shipping Administration Transport (550) USAT
- Operator: Coastwise Line
- Builder: California Shipbuilding Corporation, Terminal Island, California
- Yard number: 0298
- Laid down: 23 June 1942
- Launched: 4 August 1942
- Sponsored by: Mrs. Neil Petree, secretary of the Stanford Women's Club of Los Angeles
- Completed: 25 August 1942
- Out of service: August 1967
- Fate: Scrapped 1967

General characteristics
- Class & type: Type EC2-S-C1 Liberty ship
- Propulsion: Single screw

SS Leland Stanford was a Liberty ship built for service in World War II.

== Namesake ==
The ship was named for Amasa Leland Stanford, California governor, president of the Central Pacific Railroad, and founder of Stanford University.

== Construction ==
Leland Stanford was the 53rd ship launched by the California Shipbuilding Corporation, at Long Beach, California. She was launched 42 days after her keel was laid. The sponsor of the ship was Mrs. Neil Petree, secretary of the Stanford Women's Club of Los Angeles. Her maid of honor was her daughter, Virginia Petree. Mrs. Petree, formerly Vera Margaret Thomas, took her A.B. degree at Stanford in 1918.

== Service ==
She was operated by the Coastwise Line under a charter with the Maritime Commission and War Shipping Administration. The need for transporting German prisoners to the United States from North Africa caused many cargo ships including many Liberty ships to be converted with five-tier bunks as well as facilities to provide food, water, environmental controls and sanitation. Around 550 could be accommodated. These arrangements were retained for use in transporting American troops later in the war. Leland Stanford was one of those temporarily modified.

The Leland Stanford carried troops to Oran, Algeria, in 1943.

The ship ran aground on 19 January 1944 on Hen and Chickens Shoal off of Cape Henlopen, Delaware, in zero visibility. The USS Allegheny responded and for two days unsuccessfully attempted to unground the vessel before being called away to a more severe disaster, the collision and fire of the MV Plattsburg Socony and the Liberty ship SS Charles Henderson. Finally the Leland Stanford worked herself loose without further assistance.

On the night of 24 November 1945, the Leland Stanford went aground on the Goodwin Sands off of Kent, at the northern end of the strait of Dover. The ship, carrying some 500 homeward-bound American troops, was refloated early 25 November with the aid of tugs. [Note - another source cites a 1 November 1945 grounding that caused damage but only gives the location as the NE Atlantic Ocean.]

== Fate ==
The Leland Stanford was scrapped at Oakland, California, in 1967.
