= SS Mariposa (1953) =

Passenger ship

History
- Name: Pine Tree Mariner (1953–1956); Mariposa (1956–1982); Jin Jang (1982–1992); Queen of Jin Jang (1992–1995); Heng Li (1995–1996)
- Operator: US Marine Corps; Matson Lines; Pacific Far East Line; China Ocean Shipping Company
- Builder: Bethlehem Shipbuilding Corporation Quincy, Massachusetts
- Launched: 1952
- In service: 1953
- Out of service: 1995
- Identification: IMO number: 5225370
- Fate: Scrapped at Alang, India, 1996

General characteristics
- Type: Cargo ship (as Pine Tree Mariner) Ocean liner (as Mariposa)
- Tonnage: 14,812 GRT
- Length: 604 ft
- Beam: 76 ft
- Draft: 29.9 ft
- Depth of hold: 44.6 ft
- Decks: 5
- Installed power: steam turbines 28,450 SHP
- Propulsion: two propellers
- Speed: 20 kn
- Range: 12,000 nm at 15 kn
- Boats & landing craft carried: 20 x lifeboats
- Capacity: 365 passengers
- Crew: 359

The passenger ship Mariposa, originally built as the freighter Pine Tree Mariner, was in operation for over 40 years. It had five passenger decks and various amenities including an outdoor pool on the boat deck and the cinema on the lower decks.

== History ==
=== As a freighter ===
In November 1952, the ship was launched at the Bethlehem Shipbuilding shipyard in Quincy as a turbine general cargo freighter Pine Tree Mariner of the type C4-S-1a (Mariner class). In 1953, the US Maritime Commission took over the ship, which was intended for use by the US Marine Corps.

=== Conversion to a combined freighter/passenger ship ===
After the US shipping company Matson Navigation Company took over the ship in 1955/56, it sent the Pine Tree Mariner to the Willamette Iron & Steel Corporation shipyard in Portland, Oregon, where it was converted to a combined ship of the MARAD type P2-S1-1g. After delivery, the converted ship was renamed Mariposa and began its combined passenger and freight service between San Francisco, Honolulu, Auckland and Sydney on October 27, 1956, together with the Monterey.

=== Pacific Far East Line and uncertain years ===
In 1971, Matson sold the pair of ships Mariposa and Monterey to the shipping company Pacific Far East Line, also based in San Francisco, which used both ships on Pacific cruises until 1978 and laid them up in 1978 when government subsidies to maintain the service ended. In 1979, it was sold to the airline President World Airways from San Francisco, which had the ship towed to Japan in November 1980. After arriving in Japan in January 1981, the ship was laid up there before being returned to the Pacific Far East Line in 1981. In 1983, the shipping company China Ocean Shipping acquired the Mariposa, renamed her Jin Jiang and used her on the Shanghai-Hong Kong route. In 1992 she was renamed Queen of Jin Jiang, followed by another renaming to Heng Li the following year. After thirteen years of service in Asia, the Heng Li finally arrived in India for demolition in the spring of 1996.
