= SS Rufus King =

Liberty ship of WWII

Coordinates: 27°22′40.12″S 153°27′53.67″E

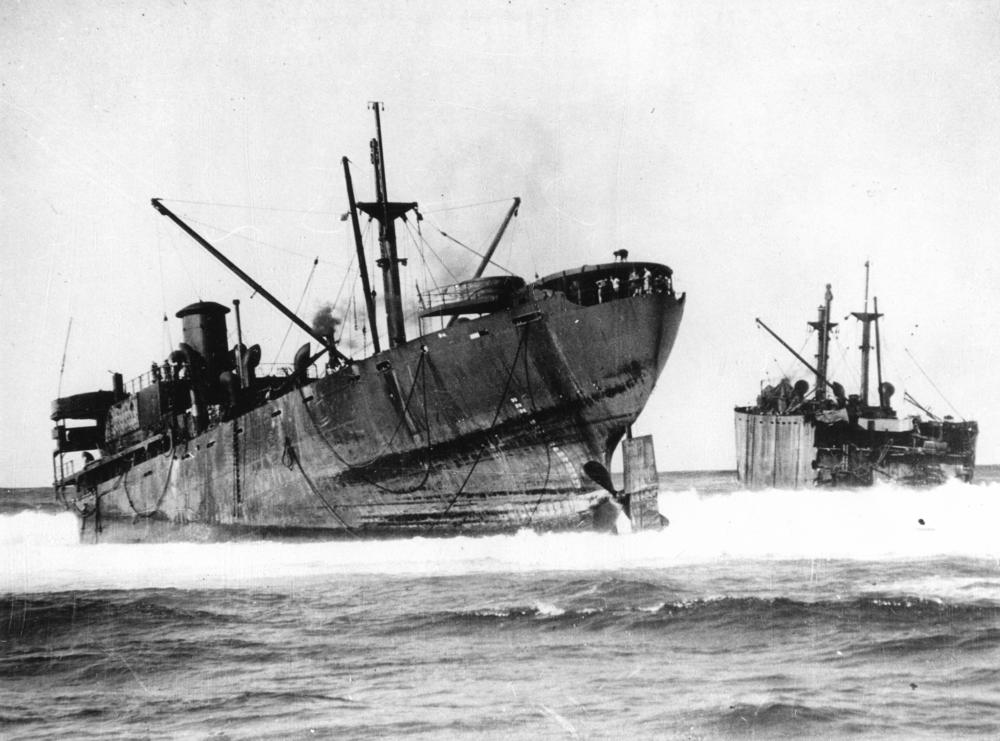
- Rufus King broken in two after hitting sandbar.

History
- Name: Rufus King
- Owner: Maritime Administration
- Operator: War Shipping Administration
- Port of registry: Los Angeles, California
- Builder: California Shipbuilding, Los Angeles CA
- Way number: 14
- Laid down: 6 October 1941
- Launched: 11 March 1942
- Completed: 29 May 1942
- Identification: U.S. Official Number: 241607; Signal: KEVQ
- Fate: Wrecked 7 July 1942
- Notes: The vessel does not appear in Merchant Vessels of the United States for fiscal year ending June 30, 1942 and only appears in the 1943 registry as a casualty (with location error) so some U.S. registry details are missing. Lloyd's Register has GRT corrected and some dimensions stricken.

General characteristics
- Type: Liberty (EC2-S-C1)
- Tonnage: 7,176 GRT, 4,380 NRT, 10,807 DWT
- Displacement: 14,230 tons
- Length: 422 ft (128.6 m)
- Beam: 57 ft (17.4 m)
- Depth: 27.8 ft (8.5 m)
- Propulsion: Triple expansion 3 cyl steam engine
- Speed: 12.5 kn (14.4 mph; 23.2 km/h)
- Capacity: 499,573 cu ft (14,146.3 m^{3}) (bale)

SS Rufus King was a standard Liberty ship built in the United States during World War II. She was named after Founding Father Rufus King, and was wrecked in July 1942, upon Amity Bar South of Moreton Island and north of North Stradbroke Island, Queensland, Australia. She was operated by International Freighting Corporation under charter with the Maritime Commission and War Shipping Administration.

Cargo included nine crated bombers and medical supplies for twelve hospitals totaling 4,000 beds. The loss of the medical cargo would have been disastrous for medical service to forces in Australia. More than 85% of that cargo was salvaged by Australian salvage crews and U.S. Army medical personnel.

Ownership of the bow section was transferred to the U.S. Army, salvaged and converted in Australia into a repair facility for supporting the U.S. Army Small Ships Section water craft and vessels and dubbed "Half Rufus" (Note: Some Australian sources use a reversed "Rufus Half" instead.) serving at Milne Bay and Finschhafen during the New Guinea Campaign through 1945.

The stern section remains in place and is now a dive site.

== Rufus King ==
Rufus King was a standard Liberty (EC2-S-C1) ship laid down 6 October 1941 as Maritime Commission hull 280, yard hull number 14, at California Shipbuilding Corporation (CalShip), Los Angeles, California. The ship was launched 11 March 1942 and delivered to the War Shipping Administration (WSA) on 29 May after 156 days on the ways, 79 in the water fitting out for a total construction time of 235 days. The ship, U.S. Official Number 241607, was operated at delivery for WSA by its agent, Pacific Far East Line, Coastwise entity under a General Agency Agreement (GAA). Rufus King operated under charter through WSA by the Army Transport Service.

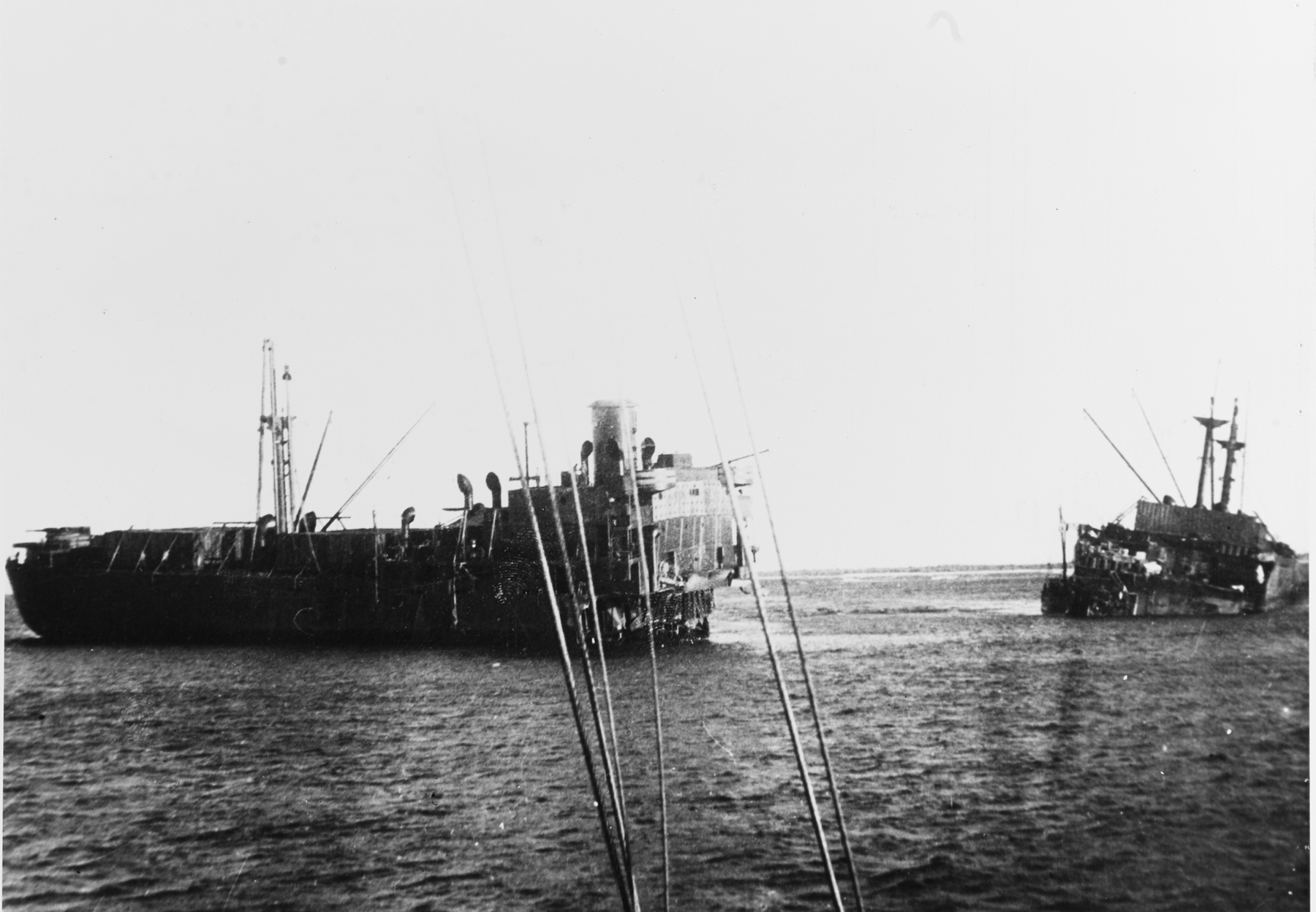
The wreck of the U.S. Liberty ship Rufus King off Moreton Island, Australia, August 1942. The deck cargo has not yet been salvaged.

The ship, inward bound to Brisbane from Los Angeles, was wrecked 7 July 1942 on Amity Bar between Moreton Island and North Stradbroke Island, Queensland, Australia after apparently mistaking the south passage for the north west passage around the island. The cargo, including surgical equipment to equip nine station and three general hospitals, totaling 4,000 beds, and nine crated B-25 Mitchell bombers, (Note: Photo of ship before salvage of deck cargo shows crates on after decks.) was salvaged and there was no loss of life.

A disastrous effect on Army medical services in the South West Pacific theater was avoided when high seas abatement made salvage possible. An Australian salvage crew of over 200 with U.S. Army medical personnel salvaged more than 85% of the 17,200 boxes of medical cargo which then had to be dried and rehabilitated at the Brisbane medical supply depot.

== Bow section transfer to U.S. Army ==
Title to the bow section was passed to the Army which was billed $12,500. The bow was salvaged by the Commonwealth Marine Salvage Board, taken over by the U.S. Army Small Ships Section and equipped with coal bunkers and a vertical boiler for power. A machine shop for repairing equipment and vessels and fuel oil bunkers for refueling other vessels was installed. The salvaged bow was given the Small Ships Section number S-129 and dubbed "Half Rufus" then it was towed to Milne Bay, arriving 21 June 1944. After being moved to Finschhafen repair equipment was transferred to a barge in April 1945 and the bow section then used as a coal hulk.

== Wreck ==
The wreck of the stern portion lies just outside the breakers on the western side of the south passage between Moreton Island and North Stradbroke Island attracting fish and divers. A local seafood market in Amity Point and Brisbane is apparently named for the ship.
