= USS Codington =

Cargo ship of the United States Navy

History

United States
- Name: Codington
- Namesake: Codington County, South Dakota
- Ordered: as type (C1-M-AV1) hull, MC hull 2146
- Builder: Froemming Brothers, Inc., Milwaukee, Wisconsin
- Yard number: 18
- Laid down: 1944
- Launched: 29 November 1944
- Sponsored by: Mrs. W. P. Plehl
- Commissioned: 23 July 1945
- Decommissioned: 27 February 1946
- Stricken: 5 June 1946
- Identification: Hull symbol: AK-173; Code letters: NEIR
- Fate: Sold to a South Korean buyer, 27 May 1956

History

South Korea
- Name: Pohang
- Namesake: City of Pohang, South Korea
- Acquired: 27 May 1956
- Fate: Scrapped at Kaohsiung, Taiwan, January 1974

General characteristics
- Class & type: Alamosa-class cargo ship
- Type: C1-M-AV1
- Tonnage: 5,032 long tons deadweight (DWT)
- Displacement: 2,382 long tons (2,420 t) (standard); 7,450 long tons (7,570 t) (full load)
- Length: 388 ft 8 in (118.47 m)
- Beam: 50 ft (15 m)
- Draft: 21 ft 1 in (6.43 m)
- Installed power: 1 × Nordberg, TSM 6 diesel engine; 1,750 shp (1,300 kW)
- Propulsion: 1 × propeller
- Speed: 11.5 kn (21.3 km/h; 13.2 mph)
- Capacity: 3,945 t (3,883 long tons) DWT; 9,830 cu ft (278 m^{3}) (refrigerated); 227,730 cu ft (6,449 m^{3}) (non-refrigerated)
- Complement: 15 Officers; 70 Enlisted
- Armament: 1 × 3 in (76 mm)/50 caliber dual-purpose gun (DP); 6 × 20 mm (0.8 in) Oerlikon anti-aircraft (AA) cannons

USS Codington (AK-173) was an Alamosa-class cargo ship commissioned by the U.S. Navy for service in World War II. She was responsible for delivering troops, goods and equipment to locations in the war zone.

== Construction ==
Codington was launched 29 November 1944, by Froemming Brothers, Inc., Milwaukee, Wisconsin, under a Maritime Commission contract, MC hull 2145; sponsored by Mrs. W. P. Plehl; and commissioned at Galveston, Texas, 23 July 1945.

== Service history ==
=== World War II Pacific Theatre operations ===
Codington departed Galveston 11 August 1945 for Leyte, arriving 11 October. She assumed cargo operations in the Philippines, with one voyage to New Guinea, 1 – 27 December, until 30 January 1946, when she sailed from Subic Bay for Yokosuka.

=== Post-war decommissioning ===
Codington was decommissioned at Tokyo 27 February 1946, and transferred to the War Shipping Administration for disposal.

== Merchant service ==
Codington was leased by Coastwise Line for Military Sea Transportation Service, 7 May 1956, then sold to a South Korean buyer, 27 May 1956, for $693,862. She was renamed Pohang, for the South Korean city of Pohang, and reflagged South Korean.

On 11 November 1972, while discharging her cargo at Phnom Penh, Cambodia, she was damaged by a mine. She was able to proceed to Singapore, for dry docking. She was finally scrapped at Kaohsiung, Taiwan, January 1974.

== Notes ==
Citations

== Bibliography ==
Online resources

- "Codington". Dictionary of American Naval Fighting Ships. Naval History and Heritage Command. This article incorporates text from this source, which is in the public domain.
- "C1 Cargo Ships". ShipbuildingHistory.com. 28 August 2009.
- "Codington (AK-173)". NavSource. 18 April 2014.
- "Clarion". United States Department of Transportation. Archived from the original on 5 November 2016.
