= SS St. Albans Victory =

United States Merchant Marine ship

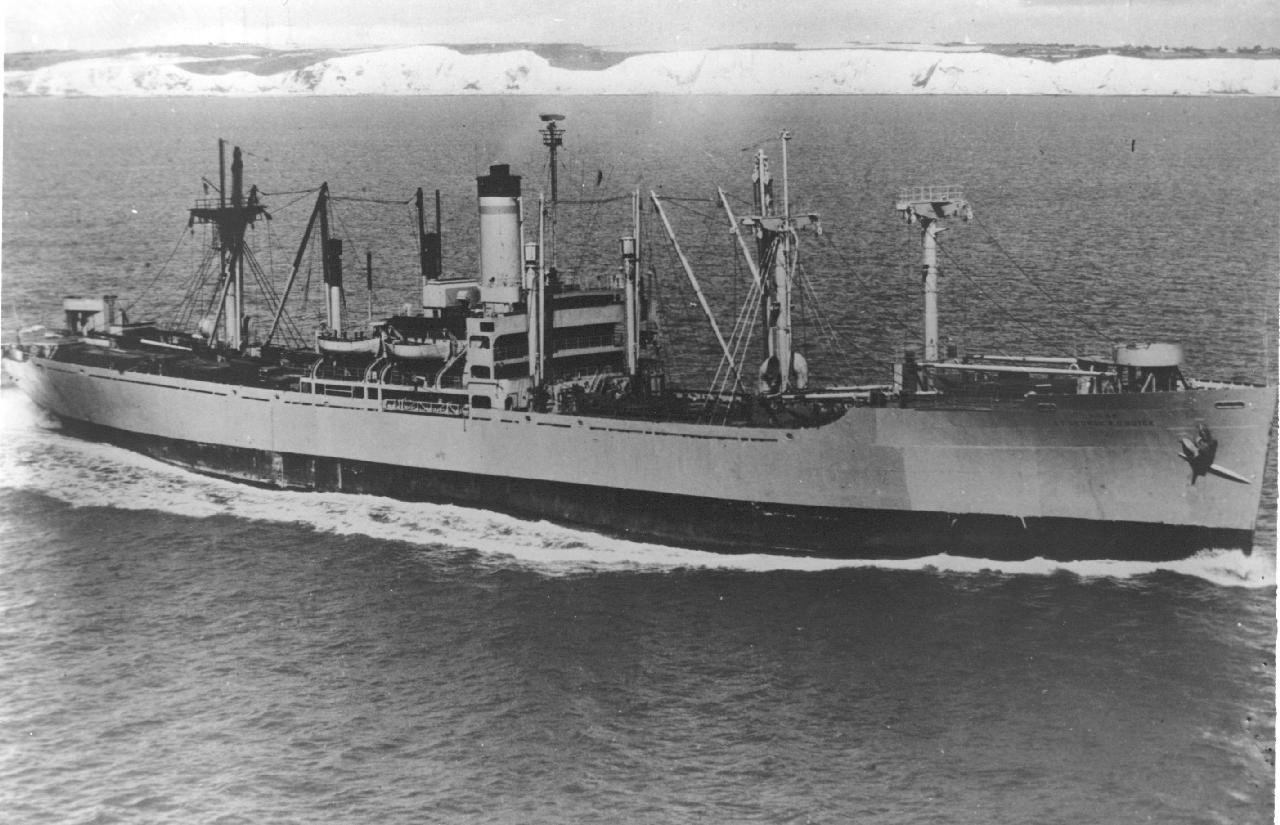
- A Bethlehem Shipbuilding Victory ship.

History

United States
- Name: St. Albans Victory
- Ordered: as type (VC2-S-AP2) hull, MCV hull 605
- Builder: Bethlehem-Fairfield Shipyard, Inc., Baltimore, Maryland
- Laid down: 20 July 1944
- Launched: 5 October 1944
- Completed: 9 November 1944
- Fate: Wrecked and scrapped in 1972

General characteristics
- Class & type: Boulder Victory-class cargo ship
- Displacement: 4,480 long tons (4,550 t) (standard); 15,580 long tons (15,830 t) (full load)
- Length: 455 ft (139 m)
- Beam: 62 ft (19 m)
- Draft: 29 ft 2 in (8.89 m)
- Installed power: 8,500 shp (6,300 kW)
- Propulsion: 1 × cross compound steam turbine; 1 × shaft
- Speed: 15.5 kn (17.8 mph; 28.7 km/h)
- Complement: 49 officers and enlisted
- Armament: none

SS St. Albans Victory was a Victory ship cargo ship built for the U.S. Maritime Commission during the final months of World War II. She was converted to be a troop ship.

== Victory built in Maryland ==
Smith Victory under Maritime Commission contract by Bethlehem Fairfield Shipyard, Inc., Baltimore, Maryland; laid down on 20 July 1944, launched on 5 October 1944, completed on 9 November 1944 and delivered to her operator, American West African Lines.

== Service ==
SS St. Albans Victory was christened before sliding into the Patapsco River near Baltimore, Maryland. The St. Albans Victory was built by the Bethlehem-Fairfield Shipyard. The Bethlehem-Fairfield Shipyard employed 47,000 people. Smith Victory could carry 10,800 tons of supplies or 1,500 troops at a top speed of 15 knots. St. Albans Victory was converted to a troopship and used to bring troops home as part of Operation Magic Carpet. St. Albans Victory was operated by American West African Lines. The St. Albans Victory returned about 7,000 troops. In 1947 she was laid up in the James River Reserve Fleet. In 1949 St. Albans Victory was sold to China Union Lines of Shanghai, (later Taiwan) and renamed the SS Shanghai. In 1951 she was sold to the Argosy Steamship Company of Panama and renamed SS Hafez. In 1953 she was sold to HO, Korea Shipping Corporation of Republic of Korea and renamed SS Nam Hae Ho. In 1954 she was renamed SS Namhae. On December 18, 1972, she ran aground in Pusan Harbour and broke in two. She was a total loss and was scrapped.

== See also ==
- SS Waterville Victory
- SS Gustavus Victory
- List of Victory ships
- Liberty ship
- Type C1 ship
- Type C2 ship
- Type C3 ship
