= SS Swarthmore Victory =

Victory ship of the United States

- Typical Victory ship

History

United States
- Namesake: Swarthmore College in Pennsylvania
- Operator: United States Lines and then Pacific Far East Line
- Builder: Permanente Metals, plant No. 2
- Yard number: 737
- Laid down: January 31, 1945
- Launched: March 14, 1945
- Completed: April 7, 1945
- Fate: Scrapped in 1988

General characteristics
- Class & type: VC2-S-AP3 Victory ship
- Tonnage: 7,612 GRT, 4,553 NRT
- Displacement: 15,200 tons
- Length: 455 ft (139 m)
- Beam: 62 ft (19 m)
- Draught: 28 ft (8.5 m)
- Installed power: 8,500 shp (6,300 kW)
- Propulsion: HP & LP turbines geared to a single 20.5-foot (6.2 m) propeller
- Speed: 16.5 knots (30.6 km/h; 19.0 mph)
- Boats & landing craft carried: 4 Lifeboats
- Complement: 62 Merchant Marine and 28 US Naval Armed Guards
- Armament: 1 × 5-inch (127 mm)/38 caliber gun; 1 × 3-inch (76 mm)/50 caliber gun; 8 × 20 mm Oerlikon

SS Swarthmore Victory (MCV-737) was a type VC2-S-AP2 Victory-class cargo ship built for the United States during World War II. The ship was built as part of the Emergency Shipbuilding program by Permanente Metals Corporation in Yard 2 of the Richmond Shipyards in Richmond, California. Named after Swarthmore College in Pennsylvania. Caomplete on April 7, 1945 Swarthmore Victory delivered supplies for the Pacific War and was operated by the United States Lines.

== Post war ==
In 1948 Catalina Wild Life Expeditions, owned by Noel Rosefelt, hired Swarthmore Victory to import animals including elephants. The four baby elephants for Tom Packs Circus in New Orleans became known to the world before coming to America. Swarthmore Victory was delayed by two typhoons coming from Siam. The ship ran out of hay for the elephants four days before landing and worms for the birds on board. So started Operation Haylift. The Swarthmore Victory's captain radioed the Naval Air Station Alameda that the ship had an emergency need of food for the hungry 6 four year elephants for a circus and tropical birds for zoos. The Navy sent a large flying boat, a Martin JRM Mars named the Marshall Mars. The plane dropped Hay and worms in waterproof bags into the ocean. The food was retrieved by the ship's crew. The November 1948 trip by the Marshall Mars was a round trip of 1,500 miles (2,400 km). The six Elephants and tropical birds arrived safely in the United States. One elephant, Sue arrived at the Sacramento Zoo in November 1948 and lived at the zoo until her death in April 1989. In 1950 she was laid up at the United States Navy reserve fleets in Astoria, Oregon.

== Vietnam War ==
In 1966 she was removed from the Reserve Fleet and reactivated for Vietnam War and operated by the Pacific Far East Line. She delivered goods for the United States Merchant Marine, Military Sea Transportation Service, and Military Sealift Command in Vietnam. In Vietnam, in 1969 Swarthmore Victory took several direct hits from an ambush. In 1973 she was laid up at Suisun Bay Reserve Fleet. In 1988 she was scrapped at Kaohsiung.

== See also ==
- SS Maritime Victory, a similar VC2-S-AP2 Victory ship conversion into a dedicated troopship
- SS Lane Victory
- SS Red Oak Victory
