= USS Sibley =

1944 Haskell-class attack transport

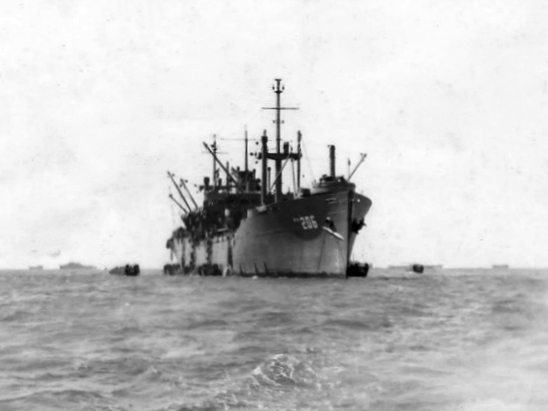
- Sibley, c. 1945

History

United States
- Name: Sibley
- Namesake: Sibley County, Minnesota
- Ordered: as a Type VC2-S-AP5 hull, MCE hull 554
- Builder: Permanente Metals Corporation, Richmond, California
- Yard number: 554
- Laid down: 17 May 1944
- Launched: 19 July 1944
- Sponsored by: Mrs Leo Gottleib
- Acquired: 2 October 1944
- Commissioned: 2 October 1944
- Decommissioned: 27 November 1946
- Stricken: 1 October 1958
- Identification: Hull symbol: APA-206; Code letters: NQOJ
- Honors and awards: 2 × battle stars for World War II service
- Fate: returned to MARCOM, 10 September 1958, laid up in Suisun Bay Reserve Fleet; sold for scrapping, 18 April 1975, delivered, 16 May 1975

General characteristics
- Class & type: Haskell-class attack transport
- Type: Type VC2-S-AP5
- Displacement: 6,873 long tons (6,983 t) (light load); 14,837 long tons (15,075 t) (full load)
- Length: 455 ft (139 m)
- Beam: 62 ft (19 m)
- Draft: 24 ft (7.3 m)
- Installed power: 2 × Combustion Engineering header-type boilers, 465 psi (3,210 kPa) 750 °F (399 °C); 8,500 shp (6,338 kW)
- Propulsion: 1 × Westinghouse geared turbine; 1 x propeller
- Speed: 17.7 kn (32.8 km/h; 20.4 mph)
- Boats & landing craft carried: 2 × LCMs; 1 × open LCPL; 18 × LCVPs; 2 × LCPRs; 1 × closed LCPL (Captain's Gig)
- Capacity: 2,900 long tons (2,900 t) DWT; 150,000 cu ft (4,200 m^{3}) (non-refrigerated)
- Troops: 87 officers, 1,475 enlisted
- Complement: 56 officers, 480 enlisted
- Armament: 1 × 5 in (127 mm)/38 caliber dual purpose gun; 1 × quad 40 mm (1.6 in) Bofors anti-aircraft (AA) gun mounts; 4 × twin 40mm Bofors (AA) gun mounts; 10 × single 20 mm (0.8 in) Oerlikon cannons AA mounts

Service record
- Part of: TransRon 15
- Operations: Assault and Occupation of Iwo Jima (10–27 February 1945); Assault and occupation of Okinawa Gunto (1–11 April 1945)
- Awards: American Campaign Medal; Asiatic–Pacific Campaign Medal; World War II Victory Medal; Navy Occupation Service Medal

USS Sibley (APA-206) was a Haskell-class attack transport in service with the United States Navy from 1944 to 1946. She was scrapped in 1975.

== History ==
Sibley was of the VC2-S-AP5 Victory ship design type. Sibley was named for Sibley County, Minnesota, which was itself named after Henry H. Sibley, an early pioneer in the territory and first Governor of the state. She was laid down on 17 May 1944, under Maritime Commission (MARCOM) contract, MC hull 554, Permanente Metals Corporation, Yard No. 2, Richmond, California; launched on 19 July 1944; sponsored by Mrs. Leo Gottleib; and acquired from MARCOM on loan-charter and commissioned on 2 October 1944.

=== Pacific War ===
Immediately after commissioning, Sibley moved from the builder's yard to the Naval Supply Depot in Oakland, California, to load supplies and provisions. On 16 October, she departed San Francisco for San Pedro, where she underwent shakedown from 20 October to 2 November, followed by amphibious training at Coronado, California from 3 to 10 November. Sailing from San Diego on 20 November, Sibley loaded cargo at San Francisco and sailed on 25 November, for Pearl Harbor, where she arrived on 2 December. From 6 December to 18 January 1945, she underwent intensive training in amphibious operations off Maui, Territory of Hawaii.

==== Invasion of Iwo Jima ====
Sibley sailed from Pearl Harbor on 27 January for the assault on Iwo Jima. After stopping at Eniwetok from 5 to 7 February, she arrived at Saipan on 11 February and underwent a final period of amphibious training on 12 and 13 February, at nearby Tinian. Sailing on 16 February, she arrived off Iwo Jima early on 19 February. Orders to debark troops were received in the middle of the afternoon; and, two hours later, all the troops were off the ship.

Sibley remained off Iwo Jima for the next eight days, unloading cargo by day and retiring by night. Also, while unloading cargo, she received casualties for return to rear areas; and, when she sailed for Saipan on 27 February, she carried 194 Marine casualties. Sibley briefly stopped at Saipan on 2 March and arrived at Guam two days later and discharged her casualties.

==== Invasion of Okinawa ====
She returned to Saipan on 7 March and loaded marines and cargo for the assault on Okinawa. After training from 16 to 19 March and a final rehearsal on 24 March, Sibley sailed on 27 March, for the assault. During the approach early on 1 April, attack transport Hinsdale was struck by a kamikaze, but the task group continued to carry out its assignment, which was to stage a demonstration off the coast of Okinawa to lead the Japanese to expect a landing on the southern part of the island. For two days, Sibley participated in this demonstration, and then the task group retired to a waiting area south of the island.

On 11 April, Sibley was ordered to return to Saipan, where she unloaded her troops and cargo, but remained on call for possible use in the Okinawa operation until 4 June. That day, Sibley sailed for Tulagi harbor in the Solomon Islands. She arrived there on 12 June, and three days later, proceeded to Espiritu Santo in the New Hebrides Islands. Arriving on 17 June, she loaded passengers and cargo, cleared Espiritu Santo on 28 June, and arrived at Guam on 5 July. Then, on 14 July, she received orders to return to the United States and sailed the same day, arriving at San Francisco on 28 July.

=== Post-war ===
On 9 August 1945, Sibley sailed, this time with passengers and cargo for the Philippines. She stopped at Eniwetok and Ulithi on the way and reached Samar on 1 September. She then proceeded to Manila Bay, Subic Bay, and finally Lingayen Gulf, where she arrived on the 10th to load troops and cargo of the 33rd Infantry Division for the occupation of Japan.

After a rehearsal landing a week later, she sailed on 20 September, and arrived on 25 September, at Wakayama, Japan, where she rapidly put her troops and cargo ashore. Sailing the next day, she returned to the Philippines for more troops, which she delivered at Hiro Wan, Japan, on 22 October.

==== Operation Magic Carpet ====
On 25 October, Sibley reported for duty with Operation Magic Carpet, the transportation of servicemen back to the United States. Departing Japan on 27 October, she loaded homeward-bound troops at Manus from 2 to 4 November, and delivered them at San Francisco on 19 November. Sailing again on 5 December, she embarked more troops at Guam from 19 to 22 December and returned with them to San Francisco on 4 January 1946.

=== Decommissioning and fate ===
After a round-trip voyage to Pearl Harbor between 19 February and 4 March, Sibley reported to the Stockton Group, Pacific Reserve Fleet, on 8 April for inactivation, and was decommissioned there on 27 November 1946. Transferred to the custody of MARCOM, she was placed in the National Defense Reserve Fleet at Suisun Bay, California, 10 September 1958. Sibley was struck from the Navy List on 1 October 1958.

On 18 April 1975, the Nicolai Joffe Corporation bought Sibley for $224,489.78 to be scrapped. She was withdrawn from the fleet on 16 May 1975.

== Awards ==
Sibley received two battle stars for her World War II service.

== Notes ==
Citations

== Bibliography ==
Online resources

- "Sibley". Dictionary of American Naval Fighting Ships. Naval History and Heritage Command. 9 September 2015. This article incorporates text from this source, which is in the public domain.
- "Kaiser Permanente No. 2, Richmond CA". www.ShipbuildingHistory.com. 13 October 2010.
- "USS Sibley (APA-206)". NavSource. 21 March 2014.
- "SIBLEY (APA-206)". United States Department of Transportation. Archived from the original on 9 April 2016.
