= Pacific Far East Line =

Passengers and Shipping Company

Pacific Far East Line (PFEL)
- Industry: Maritime transport
- Founded: 1943
- Founder: Thomas E. Cuffe
- Defunct: 1978
- Fate: Bankrupted
- Headquarters: San Francisco, California (141 Battery Street)
- Area served: Far East and Worldwide
- Services: Cargo and Passengers Liners

Pacific Far East Line, also called PFEL in short, was a passenger and cargo shipping line founded in 1943 by Thomas E. Cuffe, in San Francisco, California. At the beginning he started by chartering foreign ships to run the lines in tramp trade. Later scheduled cargo services were added to the line. During World War II the South Atlantic steamship line was active with charter shipping with the Maritime Commission and War Shipping Administration.

After the end of World War II, the Pacific Far East Line purchased some of the low-cost surplus ships. All purchased ships were given names ending with the word "Bear". Pacific Far East Line flag was blue with a golden bear and below the letters PFEL, and Pacific Far East Line ads called PFEL routes "Routes of the Bear". During wartime, the South Atlantic steamship line operated Victory ships and Liberty ships. Chairman Thomas E. Cuffe died in 1959. Pacific Far East Line operated some lighter aboard ships.

In 1977, the US Maritime Subsidy Board approved the application of PFEL for being granted a construction-differential subsidy (CDS) for financing the reconstruction of four LASH barge carriers into full container ships at Bethlehem Steel's San Francisco shipyard at a cost of U$5 millions each. The four ships were the Thomas E. Cuffe, Golden Bear, Japan Bear, and the Pacific Bear, all built in 1971 and 1972 at Avondale Shipyards, Inc., New Orleans, La. However, as containerization expanded, Pacific Far East Line failed to upgrade sufficiently rapidly its fleet to container ships and modernize as other shipping lines did in the 1970s. With the Vietnam War over Pacific Far East Line lost revenues and eventually went bankrupt and closed in 1978, all ships being sold or scrapped due to age.

== Coastwise Line ==
Coastwise Line was owned-managed by Pacific Far East Line out of San Francisco, with Headquarters at 315 California Street. Coastwise Line was founded by Hector Hunt in 1938 in Portland, Oregon. The ships of Coastwise Line flew a white and blue flag with "CL" on it. During World War II, Coastwise Line was active in chartering ships. In 1960, the company closed. Coastwise Line's main ports included New York City, New Orleans, Galveston, Havana, and others. They also operated ferry lines across San Francisco Bay and riverboats between San Francisco and Sacramento. Additionally, Coastwise Line had port facilities for transferring equipment across the Sacramento River between Port Costa and Benicia, California. Main route was moving Northwest timber. Coastwise Line operated the Alaska service which ran between the Pacific Coast and British Columbia to/from Alaska. Coastwise Line operated the Columbia River service that ran between Portland, Oregon to/from Long Beach, California.

== Lykes Coastwise Line ==
Lykes-Coastwise Line was a partnership founded in 1934 in Florida, with routes on the east coast, the agreement ended in 1946. Lykes-Coastwise Line also operated charter ships during World War II.

== Pacific Far East Line Routes ==
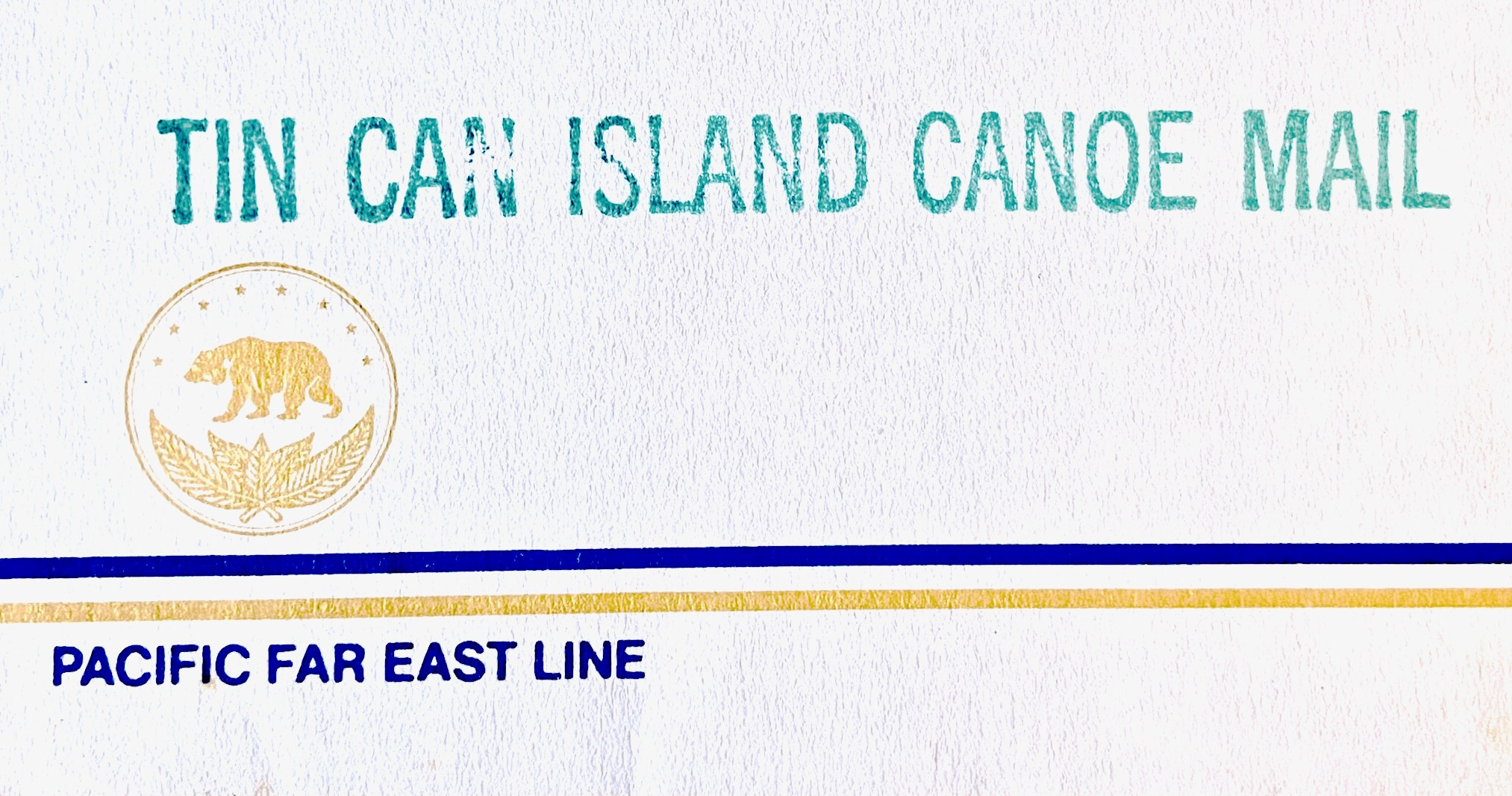
1976 envelope used in canoe mail with PFEL logo

- US homes ports were: Los Angeles and San Francisco.
- Main foreign ports were: Japan, Yokohama, Kobe, Osaka, Okinawa, Korea, Shanghai, Hong Kong, Taiwan, Vietnam, Guam, Philippines, Manila, Philippine Islands, and Thailand. Also ports in Manchuria. Some ports in the U.S.S.R. in Asia

== Ships ==
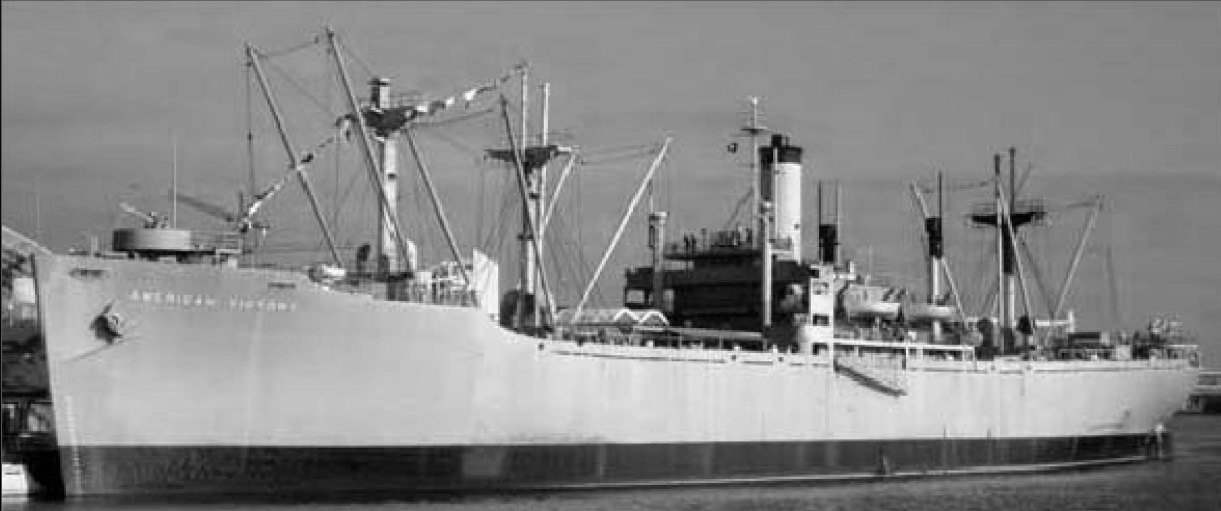
World War II Victory ship

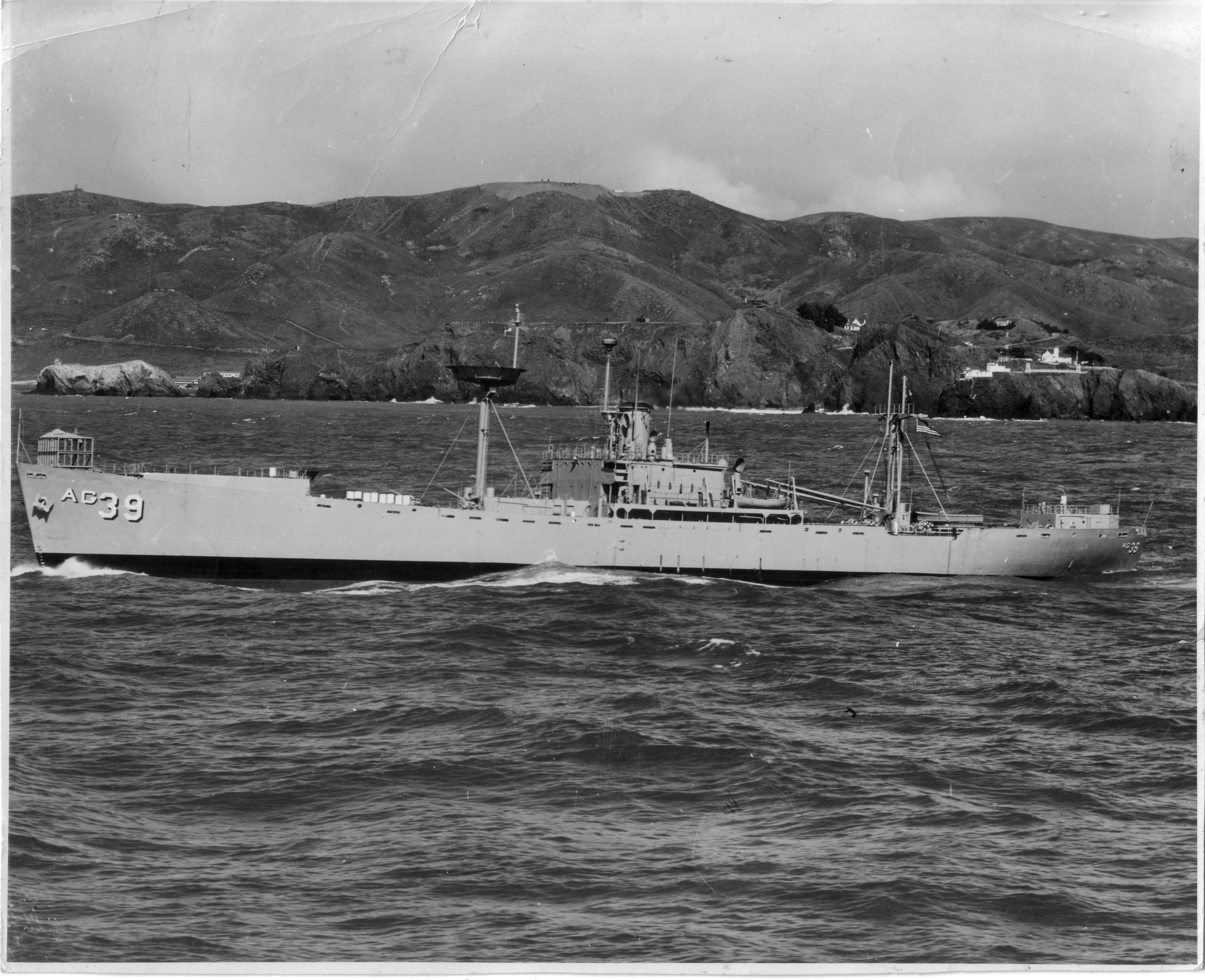
World War II Liberty ship

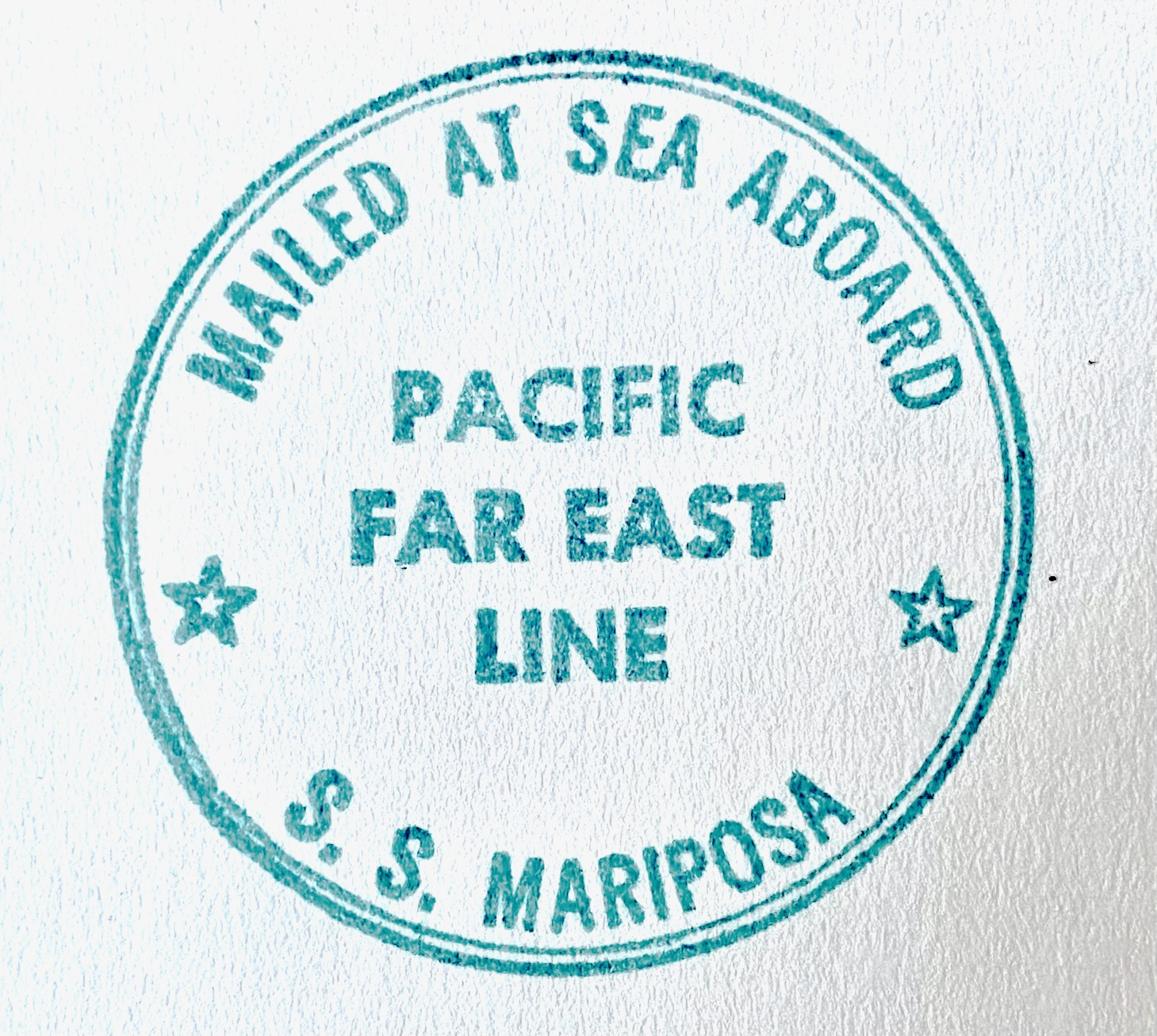
SS Mariposa ship cancellation used in 1976

Some ships charted or owned by Pacific Far East Line and Coastwise Line:

- SS Canada Bear (was SS Paducah Victory)
- SS Hawaii Bear
- SS Alaska Bear (was SS Bluefield Victory)
- SS India Bear
- SS California Bear
- SS Peter Silvester sank
- SS Golden Bear LASH carrier (was Beaver Mariner)
- SS Korean bear (was Sooner Mariner)
- SS Hong Kong Bear C4
- SS Oregon Bear C4
- SS Washington Bear C4 (was Tar Heel Mariner)
- SS Pacific Bear Sank
- SS Guam Bear (renamed SS New Zealand Bear)
- SS Japan Bear (was Grand Canyon Mariner)
- SS Tosina
- SS Portland Trader
- SS Nikobar, Sank 1934 as SS Carlsholm
- SS Ames Victory
- SS Anchorage Victory
- SS Boise Victory
- SS Villanova Victory
- SS Winthrop Victory charted for Vietnam War
- SS Simmons Victory
- SS Greeley Victory
- SS Owensboro Victory
- SS Grinnell Victory
- SS Santa Clara Victory, charted for Vietnam War
- SS Rider Victory
- SS Pan American Victory, charted for Vietnam War
- SS Princeton Victory, charted for Vietnam War
- SS Swarthmore Victory charted for Vietnam War
- SS Yugoslavia Victory
- SS Luther Burbank charted for Vietnam War
- SS Morgantown Victory for Vietnam War
- SS Lyman Stewart
- SS Morrison R. Waite
- SS Augustus Thomas
- SS Henry M. Stephens
- SS Hiram S. Maxim
- SS Edwin Abbey
- SS Chung Tung
- SS Fleetwood
- SS George Eastman
- SS Rufus King
- SS Mariposa, originally a cargo carrier named Pine Tree Mariner, bought from Matson in 1971 and sold in 1979

== Coastwise Line Ships ==
- SS Coast Farmer
- SS Coast Trader sank
- SS Coast Banker
- SS Coast Merchant
- SS Coast Shipper
- SS Coast Miller
- SS Codington
- SS Leland Stanford
- Coastal Sentry
- SS La Grange
- SS Abbot L. Mills
- SS King S. Woolsey
- SS Jacob H. Gallinger
- SS James Lick
- SS James W. Cannon
- SS Harry Leon Wilson
- SS Harvey W. Wiley
- SS Henry Villard
- SS Horace See
- SS Benjamin Bonneville
- SS Henry Longfellow
- SS Charles M. Russell
- SS Elizabeth Blackwell

== Lykes Coastwise Line ships ==
- Empire Flamingo
- Empire Falcon
- SS Joel Chandler Harris
- SS Abbot L. Mills
- Empire Ortolan

== PFEL LASH carrier ==
Two C4-S-1t LASH carriers were built by Bethlehem Shipbuilding Corporation in San Francisco:

- SS China Bear 1962 LASH carrier, scrapped 1986
- SS Philippine Bear 1962 LASH carrier, scrapped 1986

The C4-S-1 class, also known as the Mariner class, where the largest of the C4 ships, 37 were built.

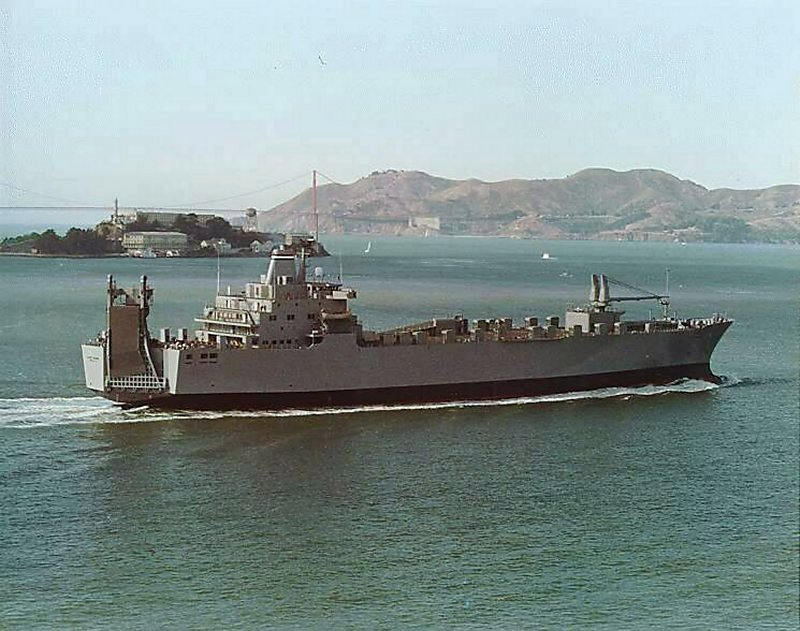
Type C7 Ship

== PFEL Ro-Ro Ship ==
- Atlantic Bear was a Roll-on/roll-off ship built in 1976 by Sun Shipyards for the Pacific Far East Line, at 17,300 DWT for $30 million, in 1984 she was renamed Atlantic Spirit in 1989 Kaimoku in 1998 El Yunque.

== PFEL Type C7 Ships ==
Bethlehem Steel's Sparrows Point Shipyard constructed two C7-S-88a container ships for Pacific Far East Line (PFEL). The two new ships were launched as SS Australia Bear and SS New Zealand Bear. Australia Bear was completed in 1973, but before New Zealand Bear had been fully outfitted both ships were sold in 1974 to Sea-Land Service, Inc. and renamed Sea-Land Consumer and Sea-Land Producer as Sealand's SL18P class. Sea-Land was bought by the CSX Corporation in 1986, and both ships were renamed in 2000. The domestic U.S. liner operations of Sea-Land were sold in 2003 and subsequently operated under the name Horizon Lines. Their service life came in a full circle when Matson, who had initially designed the ships decades earlier, acquired Horizon Lines in 2015. The vessels would serve their new owners a few more years as Matson Consumer and Matson Producer. They were scrapped in 2018 and 2019 respectively.

MA Hull #	MA Design	Original Name	Shipyard Hull #	GT	DWT	Delivery	IMO	Later Names	Fate
253	C7-S-88a	Australia Bear	4639	23,763	26,600	1973	IMO 7224306	Sea-Land Consumer, CSX Consumer, Horizon Consumer, Matson Consumer	Scrapped 2018
254	C7-S-88a	New Zealand Bear	4640	23,763	26,600	1974	IMO 7366312	Sea-Land Producer, CSX Producer, Horizon Producer, Matson Producer	Scrapped 2019

== PFEL C8-S-81b ships ==
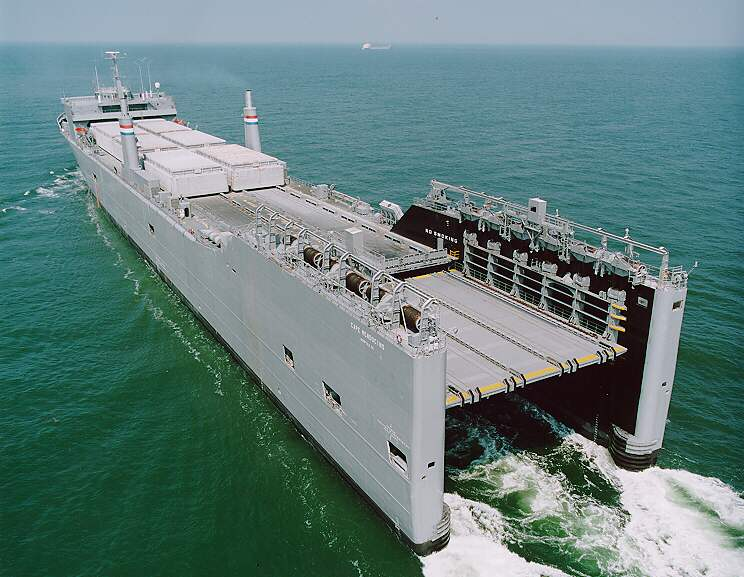
Design C8

In the late 1960s, shipbuilding engineer Jerome L. Goldman designed the first LASH ships, Type C8-class ship, the Acadia Forest and the Atlantic Forest. Avondale shipyard start construction in 1969 of the second LASH ships the C8-S-81b. The ten C8-S-81b LASH ships were of identical design and built from 1970 to 1973. The 11 ships were used by two shipping lines Prudential Grace Line in New York and Pacific Far East Line in San Francisco. The price for each ship was $21.3 million.

- C8 Barge Carrier ship names:
  - Thomas E. Cuffe, Golden Bear, Pacific Bear, Japan Bear, and China Bear

== World War II ==
Coastwise Line fleet of ships were used to help the World War II effort. During World War II Coastwise Line operated Merchant navy ships for the United States Shipping Board. During World War II Coastwise Line was active with charter shipping with the Maritime Commission and War Shipping Administration. Coastwise Line operated Liberty ships and Victory ships for the merchant navy. The ship was run by its Coastwise Line crew and the US Navy supplied United States Navy Armed Guards to man the deck guns and radio.

  - World War 2 ships:
- SS Coast Trader June 7, 1942 torpedoed
- SS Coast Farmer July 20, 1942 torpedoed
- SS Augustus Thomas Oct. 24, 1944 bombed
- SS Rufus King July 7, 1942 stranded, broke in two
- SS Samuel Heintzelman July 1, 1943 sank by surface raider in Indian Ocean
- SS Peter Sylvester Feb. 6, 1945 torpedoed
- SS Abbot L. Mills
- SS Rider Victory
- SS Ames Victory
- SS Anchorage Victory
- SS Anniston Victory
- SS Harry Leon Wilson
- SS Jacob H. Gallinger
- SS Villanova Victory
- SS Yugoslavia Victory
- SS Boise Victory
- SS Princeton Victory
- SS Benjamin Bonneville
- SS Owensboro Victory
- SS Elizabeth Blackwell
- SS Simmons Victory
- SS Charles M. Russell

== See also ==
- World War II United States Merchant Navy
