= List of Victory ships (P) =

This is a list of Victory ships with names beginning with P.

== Description ==
A Victory ship was a cargo ship. The cargo ships were 455 feet 3 inches (138.76 m) overall, 436 feet 6 inches (133.05 m) between perpendiculars They had a beam of 62 feet 0 inches (18.90 m), a depth of 38 feet 0 inches (11.58 m) and a draught of 28 feet 0 inches (8.53 m). They were assessed at 7,612 GRT, 4,555 NRT and 10,750 DWT.

The ships were powered by a triple expansion steam engine, driving a steam turbine via double reduction gear. This gave the ship a speed of 15.5 knots (28.7 km/h) or 16.5 knots (30.6 km/h), depending on the machinery installed.

Liberty ships had five holds. No. 1 hold was 57 feet 6 inches (17.53 m) long, with a capacity of 81,715 cubic feet (2,313.9 m^{3}), No. 2 hold was 45 feet 0 inches (13.72 m) long, with a capacity of 89,370 cubic feet (2,531 m^{3}), No. 3 hold was 78 feet 0 inches (23.77 m) long, with a capacity of 158,000 cubic feet (4,500 m^{3}), No. 4 hold was 81 feet 0 inches (24.69 m) long, with a capacity of 89,370 cubic feet (2,531 m^{3}) and No. 5 hold was 75 feet 0 inches (22.86 m) long, with a capacity of 81,575 cubic feet (2,309.9 m^{3}).

In wartime service, they carried a crew of 62, plus 28 gunners. The ships carried four lifeboats. Two were powered, with a capacity of 27 people and two were unpowered, with a capacity of 29 people.

== Pachaug Victory ==
Pachaug Victory was built by Bethlehem Fairfield Shipyard, Baltimore, Maryland. Her keel was laid on 8 August 1944. She was launched on 13 October and delivered on 16 November. Built for the War Shipping Administration (WSA), she was operated under the management of Merchants and Miners Transportation Company. To the Ministry of Transport, London, United Kingdom in 1946. Operated under the management of Furness, Withy & Co. To the United States Maritime Commission (USMC) in 1947. Laid up in the James River. She was scrapped at Philadelphia, Pennsylvania in 1974.

== Pacific Victory ==
Pacific Victory was built by California Shipbuilding Corporation, Terminal Island, Los Angeles, California. Her keel was laid on 3 May 1945. She was launched on 28 June and delivered on 28 July. Built for the WSA, she was operated under the management of United Fruit Company. Laid up in the Hudson River in 1948. Returned to service in 1966 due to the Vietnam War. Operated under the management of Pacific Coast Transportation Co. Laid up in Suisun Bay in 1973. She was scrapped at Kaohsiung, Taiwan in 1989.

== Paducah Victory ==
Paducah Victory was built by Oregon Shipbuilding Corporation, Portland, Oregon. Her keel was laid on 30 December 1944. She was launched on 9 February 1945 and delivered on 14 March. Built for the WSA, she was operated under the management of Pacific-Atlantic Steamship Company. Laid up at Mobile, Alabama in 1949. Sold in 1951 to Pacific Far East Line, San Francisco, California and renamed Canada Bear. Sold in 1970 to Fred F. Noonan Co., San Francisco and renamed Golden Noon. She was scrapped at Kaohsiung in April 1971.

== Panama Victory ==
Panama Victory was built by California Shipbuilding Corporation. Her keel was laid on 5 February 1944. She was launched on 3 April and delivered on 30 May. Built for the WSA, she was operated under the management of Marine Transport Line. Sold in 1946 to Holland-Amerika Lijn, Rotterdam, Netherlands and renamed Amsteldijk. Renamed Amsteldyk in 1954. Sold in 1967 to Progressive Mariner S.A., Panama and renamed Helena. Sold in 1968 to Sincere Navigation Corp., Keelung, Taiwan. She arrived at Kaohsiung for scrapping in March 1973.

== Pan American Victory ==
Pan American Victory was built by Permanente Metals Corporation, Richmond, California. Her keel was laid on 3 March 1945. She was launched on 14 April and delivered on 9 May. Built for the WSA, she was operated under the management of American President Lines. She was laid up in Suisun Bay in May 1945. Returned to service in 1966 due to the Vietnam War. Operated under the management of Pacific Far East Line. Laid up in Suisun Bay in 1973. She was scrapped at Brownsville, Texas in 2009.

== Park Victory ==
Park Victory was built by Permanente Metals Corporation. Her keel was laid on 11 March 1945. She was launched on 21 April and delivered on 16 May. Built for the WSA, she was operated under the management of Seas Shipping Company. She was converted to a livestock carrier by Todd Shipyards, Brooklyn, New York in 1946. She was driven onto a reef 2 nautical miles (3.7 km) off Utö, Finland (59°46′N 21°24′E) on 24 December 1947 whilst on a voyage from the Hampton Roads, Virginia to a Finnish port. She subsequently capsized and was a total loss.

== Parkersburg Victory ==
Parkersburg Victory was built by Bethlehem Fairfield Shipyard. Her keel was laid on 21 July 1945. She was launched on 15 September and delivered on 11 October. Built for the WSA, she was operated under the management of Polarus Steamship Company. Laid up in the James River in 1946. Sold in 1948 to United States Lines, New York and renamed American Jurist. Sold in 1956 to Federal Bulk Carriers Inc., New York and renamed Federal Jurist. Sold in 1957 to Interocean Steamship Corporation and renamed Wang Pioneer. Renamed Interocean in 1959. Sold in 1960 to Hercules Steamship Corp., New York and renamed Hercules Victory. Sold in 1963 to Sea Tramp Corp., New York. Seized under the Bankruptcy Act in 1966 by the United States Marshals Service. Put up for auction with a reserve of $500,000 but no bids were received. Subsequently, sold privately. Purchasers were Wall Street Marine Inc., New York. She was renamed Hermina. Sold in 1967 to Hudson Marine Inc., New York. Sold in 1969 to Sunfast Maritime Co., Panama and renamed Tia Sylvia. She put in to Kaohsiung on 12 December 1969 after sustaining damage by weather whilst on a voyage from Singapore to Osaka, Japan. She sailed on 9 January 1970 to discharge her cargo, then returned to Kaohsiung, where she was scrapped in March 1970.

== Pass Christian Victory ==
Pass Christian Victory was built by Bethlehem Fairfield Shipyard. Her keel was laid on 27 July 1945. She was launched on 19 September and delivered on 18 October. Built for the WSA, she was operated under the management of Lykes Brothers Steamship Company. Laid up in the James River in 1948. Later transferred to Beaumont, Texas. She was scrapped at New Orleans, Louisiana in April 1971.

== Petersburg Victory ==
Petersburg Victory was built by California Shipbuilding Corporation. Her keel was laid on 25 June 1945. She was launched on 31 September and delivered on 3 November. Built for the WSA, she was operated under the management of J. H. Winchester & Company. Sold in 1948 to Isbrandtsen Co., New York and renamed Flying Trader. Sold in 1962 to American Export Lines Inc., New York. To American Export-Isbrandtsen Line in 1964. Sold in 1969 to Windsor Maritime Co., New York and renamed Transtar. She was scrapped at Kaohsiung in November 1960.

== Philippines Victory ==
Philippines Victory was built by California Shipbuilding Corporation. Her keel was laid on 17 January 1944. She was launched on 11 March and delivered on 9 May. Built for the WSA, she was operated under the management of Alcoa Steamship Co. Inc. Laid up in Suisun Bay in 1946. Sold in 1947 to Compagnie Maritime Congolaise, Antwerp, Belgium and renamed Mahenge. She collided with the French Liberty ship Granville off Alderney, Channel Islands (49°48′N 2°18′W) and sank on 30 June 1952 whilst on a voyage from Antwerp to the Belgian Congo.

== Phillips Victory ==
Phillips Victory was built by Permanente Metals Corporation. Her keel was laid on 14 April 1945. She was launched on 26 May and delivered on 20 June. Built for the WSA, she was operated under the management of General Steamship Company. Sold in 1946 to Ocean Steamship Company, Liverpool and renamed Memnon. Operated under the management of A. Holt & Co. Renamed Glaucus in 1957. sold in 1962 to Iranian Lloyd, Khorramshahr, Iran and renamed Persian Ferdowski. Sold in 1965 to Iranian Shipping Lines, Khorramshahr and renamed Kashan. Sold in 1966 to Frangoulis & Cliafas, Piraeus, Greece and renamed Eleni K. She was arrested at Bandar Shahpour in October 1966 for debts incurred as Kasan. She put to sea on night in November and was pursued by the Iranian Navy, which fired on her. She was re-arrested and towed back to Bandur Shahpour. Sold in 1968 to Cargo & Shipping S.A., Iran and renamed Pirouzi. She was scrapped at Hong Kong in July 1969.

== Pickaway ==
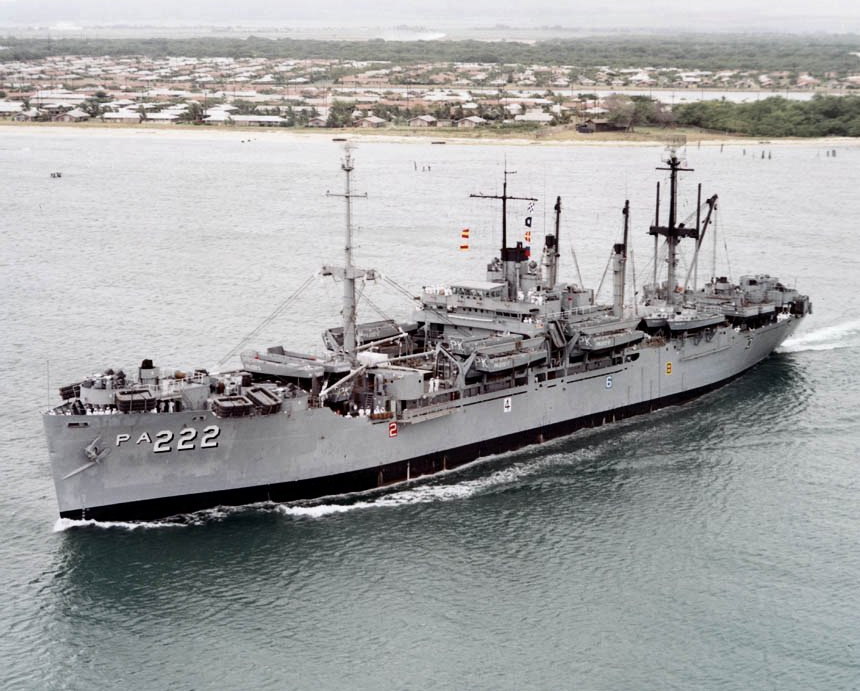
USS Pickaway

Pickaway was built by Permanente Metals Corporation. Her keel was laid on 1 September 1944. She was launched on 5 November and delivered on 12 December. Built for the United States Navy. To the USMC in 1947 and laid up in the James River. She was scrapped in the United States in 1980.

== Pickens ==
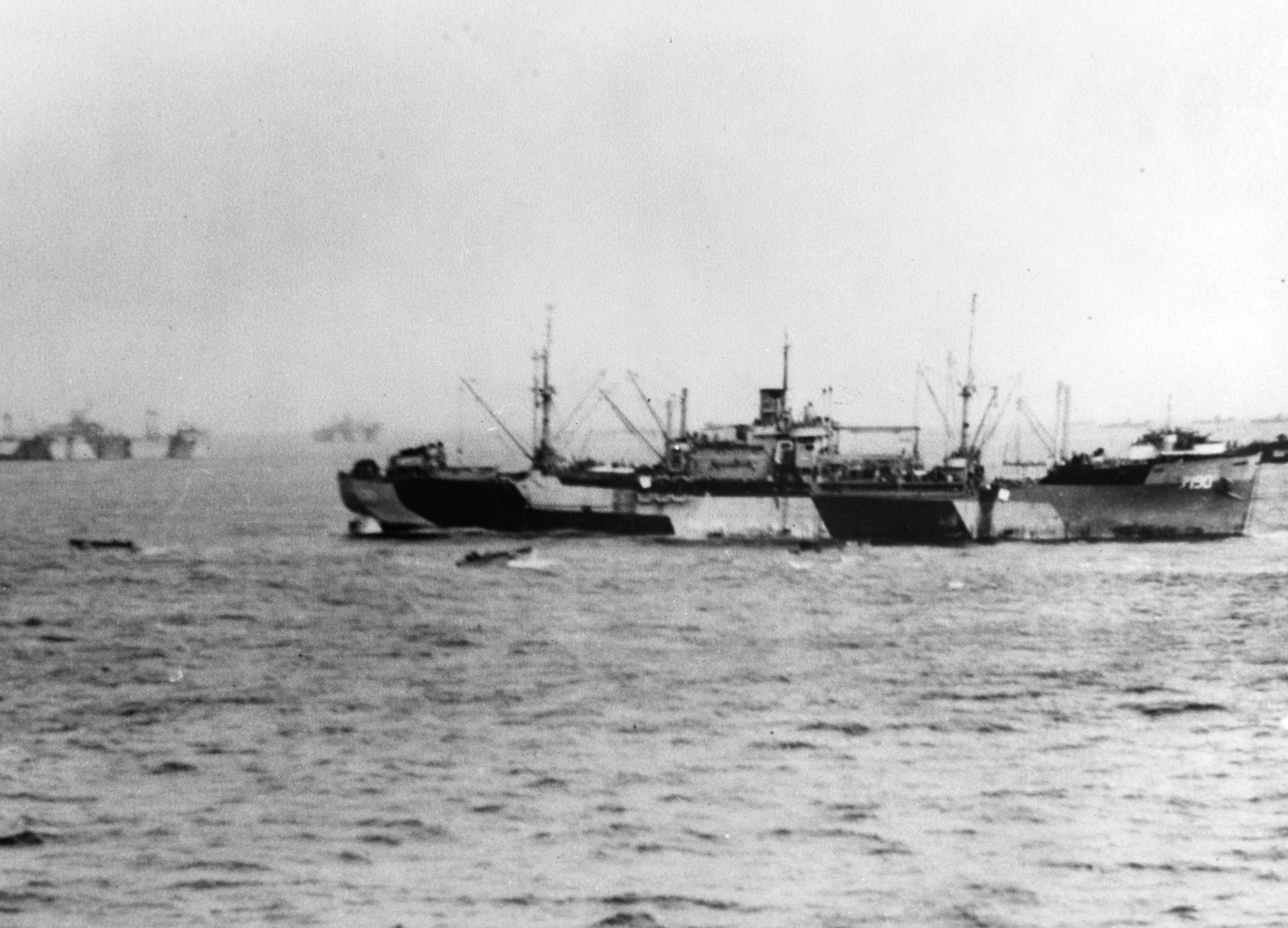
USS Pickens

Pickens was built by Kaiser Company, Vancouver, Washington. Her keel was laid on 22 April 1944.She was launched on 21 July and delivered on 18 September. Built for the United States Navy. To the USMC in 1946 and laid up in the James River. She was sold to New York shipbreakers in April 1973.

== Pierre Victory ==
Pierre Victory was built by Oregon Shipbuilding Corporation. Her keel was laid on 30 October 1944. She was launched on 6 December and delivered on 5 February 1945. Built for the WSA, she was operated under the management of United States Lines. Laid up at Wilmington, North Carolina in 1948. Later transferred to Astoria, Oregon. Sold in 1967 to Columbia Steamship Co., Wilmington, Delaware and renamed Columbia Eagle. Chartered to the Military Sea Transportation Service in 1970. She departed from Manila, Philippines for San Francisco on 11 March. A mutiny at sea later occurred and 24 of her 39 crew abandoned the ship, which diverted to Sihanoukville, Cambodia, where twelve of her crew claimed political asylum. The other three remained aboard to maintain the ship. She was released in April on condition that her cargo of munitions was not to be landed in Thailand or Vietnam. She was scrapped at Kaohsiung in June 1971.

== Pine Bluff Victory ==
Pine Bluff Victory was built by California Shipbuilding Corporation. Her keel was laid on 12 May 1945. She was launched on 7 July and delivered on 8 August. Built for the WSA, she was operated under the management of Luckenbach Steamship Co., Inc. Laid up at Astoria in 1953. Returned to service in 1966 due to the Vietnam war. Operated under the management of States Steamship Company. Laid up at Beaumont in 1973. She was scrapped at Tuxpan, Mexico in 1994.

== Pitt ==
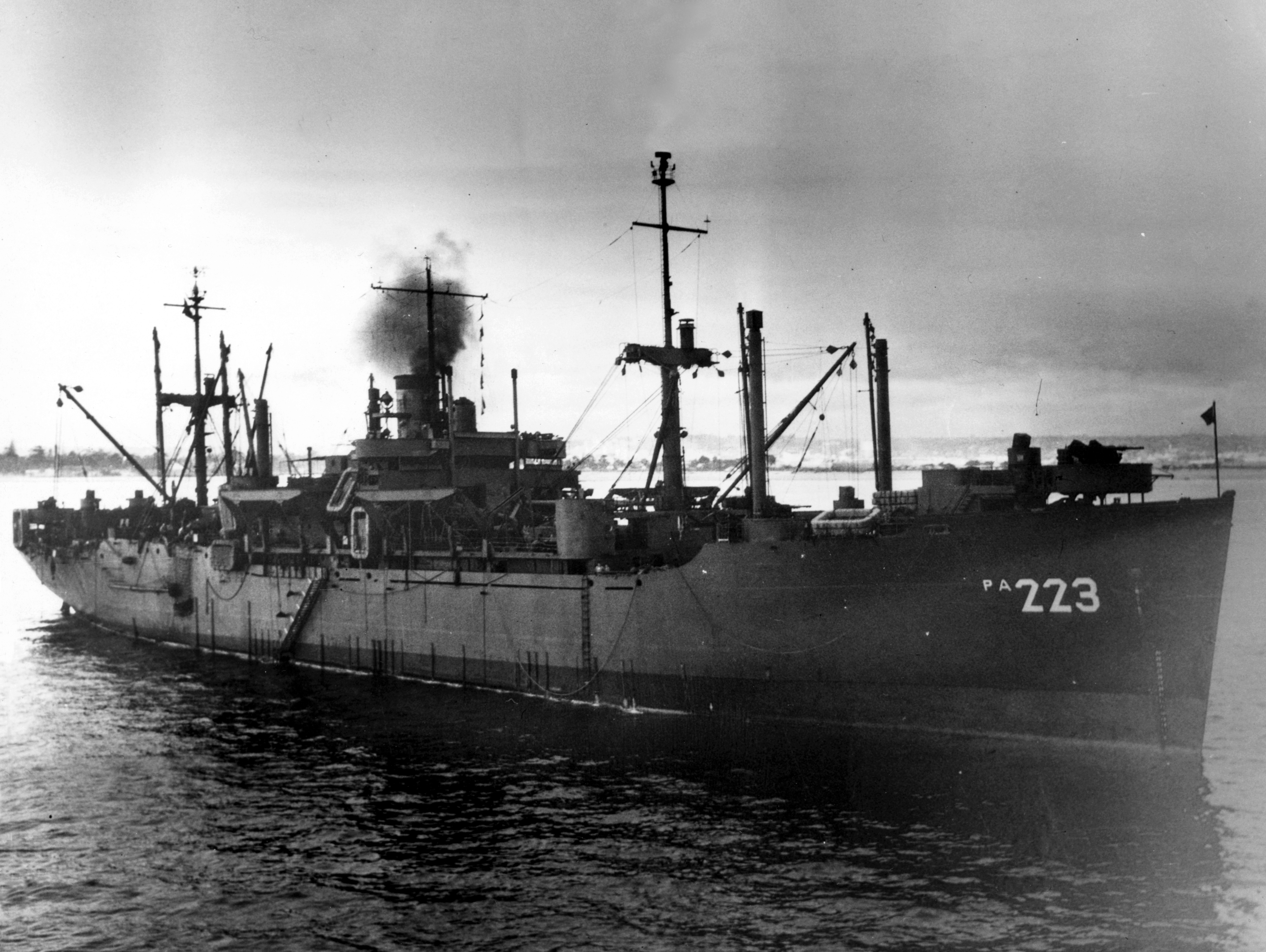
USS Pitt

Pitt was built by Permanente Metals Corporation. Her keel was laid on 8 September 1944. She was launched on 10 November and delivered on 11 December. Built for the United States Navy. To the USMC in 1947 and laid up in Suisun Bay. She was scrapped in 1980.

== Pittston Victory ==
Pittston Victory was a troop transport built by Bethlehem Fairfield Shipyard. Her keel was laid on 18 December 1944. She was launched on 10 February 1945 and delivered on 10 March. Built for the WSA, she was operated under the management of Luckenbach Steamship Co., Inc. Laid up at Astoria in 1947. Sold to Stoomvaart Maatschappij Nederland, Amsterdam later that year and renamed Lombok. Sold in 1963 to China Merchants Steam Navigation Company, Taipei, Taiwan and renamed Hai-Dah. Sold in 1973 to Yangming Marine Transport Corp., Keelung and renamed Wei Ming. Sold in 1977 to Yangming Marine Transport Corp., Keelung and renamed Ming Wisdom. She was scrapped at Kaohsiung in 1978.

== Plymouth Victory ==
Plymouth Victory was built by Oregon Shipbuilding Corporation. Her keel was laid on 8 February 1944. She was launched on 20 April and delivered on 16 May. Built for the WSA, she was operated under the management of Lykes Brothers Steamship Company. Laid up in the James River in 1948. Later transferred to Beaumont. Sold in 1965 to Cargo Ships & Tankers Inc., New York. Renamed Cortez in 1969. Sold in 1972 to Space Maritime Corp., Panama and renamed Evelyn. She was scrapped at Kaohsiung in April 1972.

== Poland Victory ==
Poland Victory was built by Oregon Shipbuilding Corporation. Her keel was laid on 30 November 1943. She was launched on 27 January 1944 and delivered on 19 March. Built for the WSA, she was operated under the management of Isthmian Steamship Company. Laid up in the James River in 1946. Sold in 1947 to Compagnie Maritime Belge Lloyd Royale, Antwerp and renamed Burckel. Sold in 1965 to United Transoceanic Shipping Corp., Liberia and renamed Hongkong Banner. Sold in 1967 to Chinese Maritime Trust, Taiwan and renamed Tsui Yung. Converted to a container ship in 1971. She was scrapped at Kaohsiung in 1978.

== Pomona Victory ==
Pomona Victory was a troop transport built by California Shipbuilding Corporation. Her keel was laid on 29 April 1944. She was launched on 26 June and delivered on 31 July. Built for the WSA, she was operated under the management of American South African Line. Sold in 1947 to Compagnie Maritime Belge Lloyd Royale and renamed Tervaete. Sold in 1965 to United Transoceanic Shipping Corp., Liberia and renamed Hongkong Delegate. Sold in 1966 to United Maritime Inc. Liberia. Converted to a container ship in 1972. She collided with the West German ship Columbus Canada off Monterey, California in 1975 and was scrapped at Oakland, California that year.

== Pondera ==
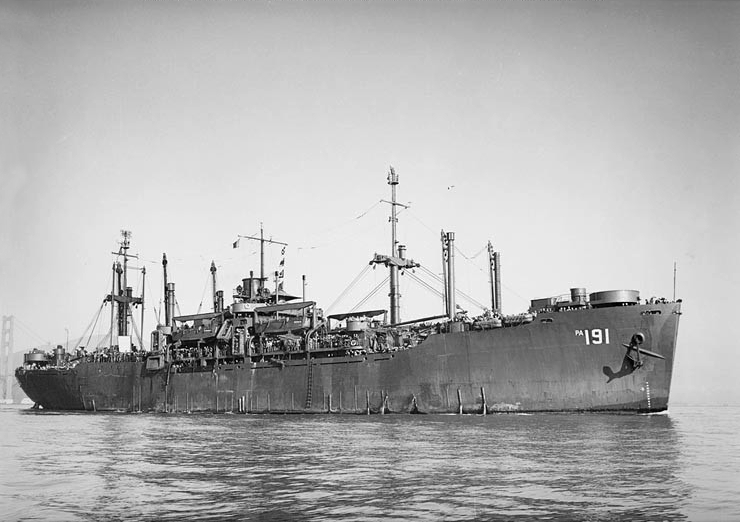
USS Pondera

Pondera was built by Kaiser Company. Her keel was laid on 28 April 1944. She was launched on 27 July and delivered on 24 September. Built for the United States Navy. To the USMC in 1946 and laid up in the James River. She was scrapped at Brownsville in 1974.

== Pontotoc Victory ==
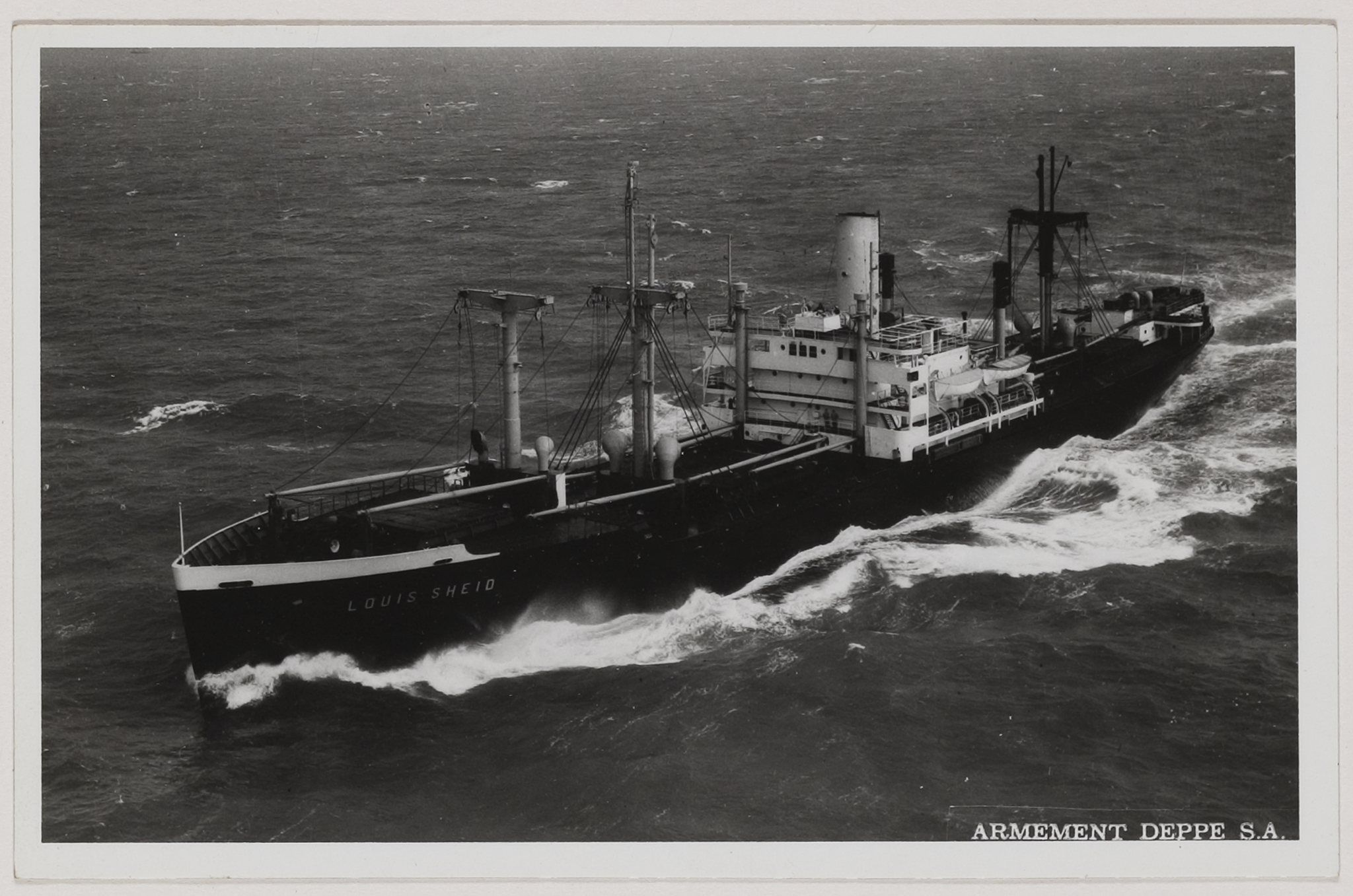
Louis Sheid

Pontotoc Victory was built by Bethlehem Fairfield Shipyard. Her keel was laid on 25 November 1944. She was launched on 26 January 1945 and delivered on 21 February. Built for the WSA, she was operated under the management of American Export Lines Inc. Laid up in the James River in 1945. Sold in 1947 to Armement Deppe Sociètè Anonyme, Antwerp and renamed Louis Sheid. Sold in 1963 to Rutland Navigation Co., Liberia and renamed Pacific Victory. Sold in 1964 to Universal Marine Corp., Liberia. She was scrapped at Kaohsiung in 1976.

== Pratt Victory ==
Pratt Victory was built by California Shipbuilding Corporation. Her keel was laid on 22 February 1945. She was launched on 14 April and delivered on 9 May. Built for the WSA, she was operated under the management of Waterman Steamship Corporation. Used by the United States Navy as an experimental minesweeper in 1945. Laid up in the James River later that year. Sold in 1961 to West Coast Steamship Co., Portland, Oregon and renamed Portland Victory. Sold in 1965 to Saxis Steamship Co., Wilmington, Delaware and renamed Columbia Victory. Sold in 1968 to Columbia Steamship Co. and renamed Columbia Trader. She was damaged by an underwater explosion at Chalna, Bangladesh on 24 November 1971. She was sold to shipbreakers in Kaohsiung in December 1971.

== Princeton Victory ==
Princeton Victory was built by Permanente Metals Corporation. Her keel was laid on 31 December 1944. She was launched on 19 February 1945 and delivered on 14 March. Built for the WSA, she was operated under the management of Coastwise Line. Laid up at Beaumont in 1948. Returned to service in 1966 due to the Vietnam War. Laid up at Beaumont in 1973. She was scrapped at Nantong, China in 1989.

== Provo Victory ==
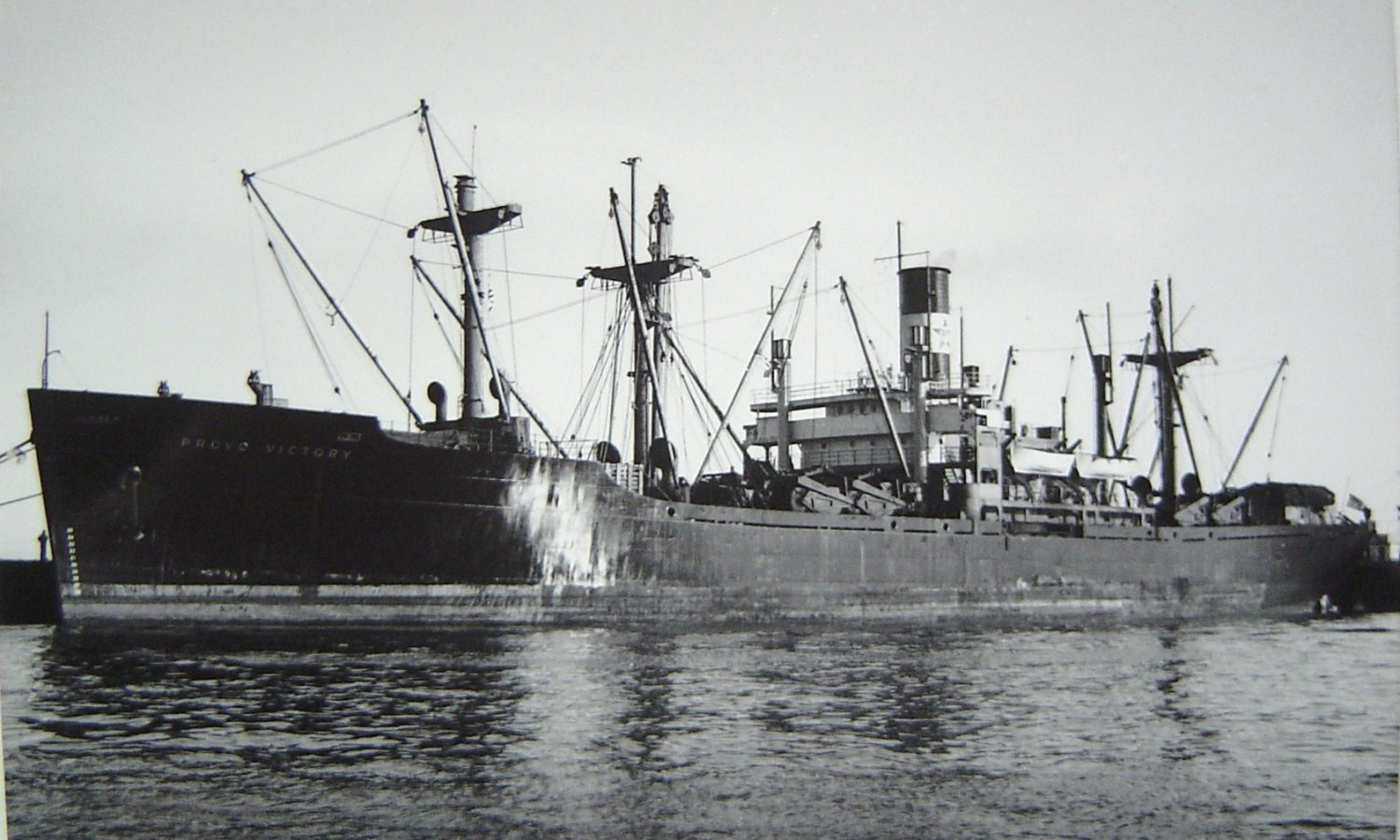
Provo Victory

Provo Victory was built by Permanente Metals Corporation. Her keel was laid on 28 June 1944. She was launched on 9 September and delivered on 18 October. Built for the United States Navy. To the USMC in 1946 and laid up in Puget Sound. Returned to service in 1966 due to the Vietnam War. Laid up Suisun Bay in 1973. She was scrapped in Taiwan in 1984.

== Purdue Victory ==
Purdue Victory was built by Permanente Metals Corporation. Her keel was laid on 11 February 1945. She was launched on 24 March and delivered on 18 April. Built for the WSA, she was operated under the management of Waterman Steamship Corporation. Laid up at Mobile in 1949. Returned to service in 1966 due to the Vietnam War. Operated under the management of Pacific Coast Transportation Co. Laid up Suisun Bay in 1973. She was scrapped in India in 1992.
