= List of Victory ships (W-Z) =

This is a list of Victory ships with names beginning with W, X, Y or Z.

== Description ==
A Victory ship was a cargo ship. The cargo ships were 455 feet 3 inches (138.76 m) overall, 436 feet 6 inches (133.05 m) between perpendiculars They had a beam of 62 feet 0 inches (18.90 m), a depth of 38 feet 0 inches (11.58 m) and a draught of 28 feet 0 inches (8.53 m). They were assessed at 7,612 GRT, 4,555 NRT and 10,750 DWT.

The ships were powered by a triple expansion steam engine, driving a steam turbine via double reduction gear. This gave the ship a speed of 15.5 knots (28.7 km/h) or 16.5 knots (30.6 km/h), depending on the machinery installed.

Liberty ships had five holds. No. 1 hold was 57 feet 6 inches (17.53 m) long, with a capacity of 81,715 cubic feet (2,313.9 m^{3}), No. 2 hold was 45 feet 0 inches (13.72 m) long, with a capacity of 89,370 cubic feet (2,531 m^{3}), No. 3 hold was 78 feet 0 inches (23.77 m) long, with a capacity of 158,000 cubic feet (4,500 m^{3}), No. 4 hold was 81 feet 0 inches (24.69 m) long, with a capacity of 89,370 cubic feet (2,531 m^{3}) and No. 5 hold was 75 feet 0 inches (22.86 m) long, with a capacity of 81,575 cubic feet (2,309.9 m^{3}).

In wartime service, they carried a crew of 62, plus 28 gunners. The ships carried four lifeboats. Two were powered, with a capacity of 27 people and two were unpowered, with a capacity of 29 people.

== Wabash Victory ==
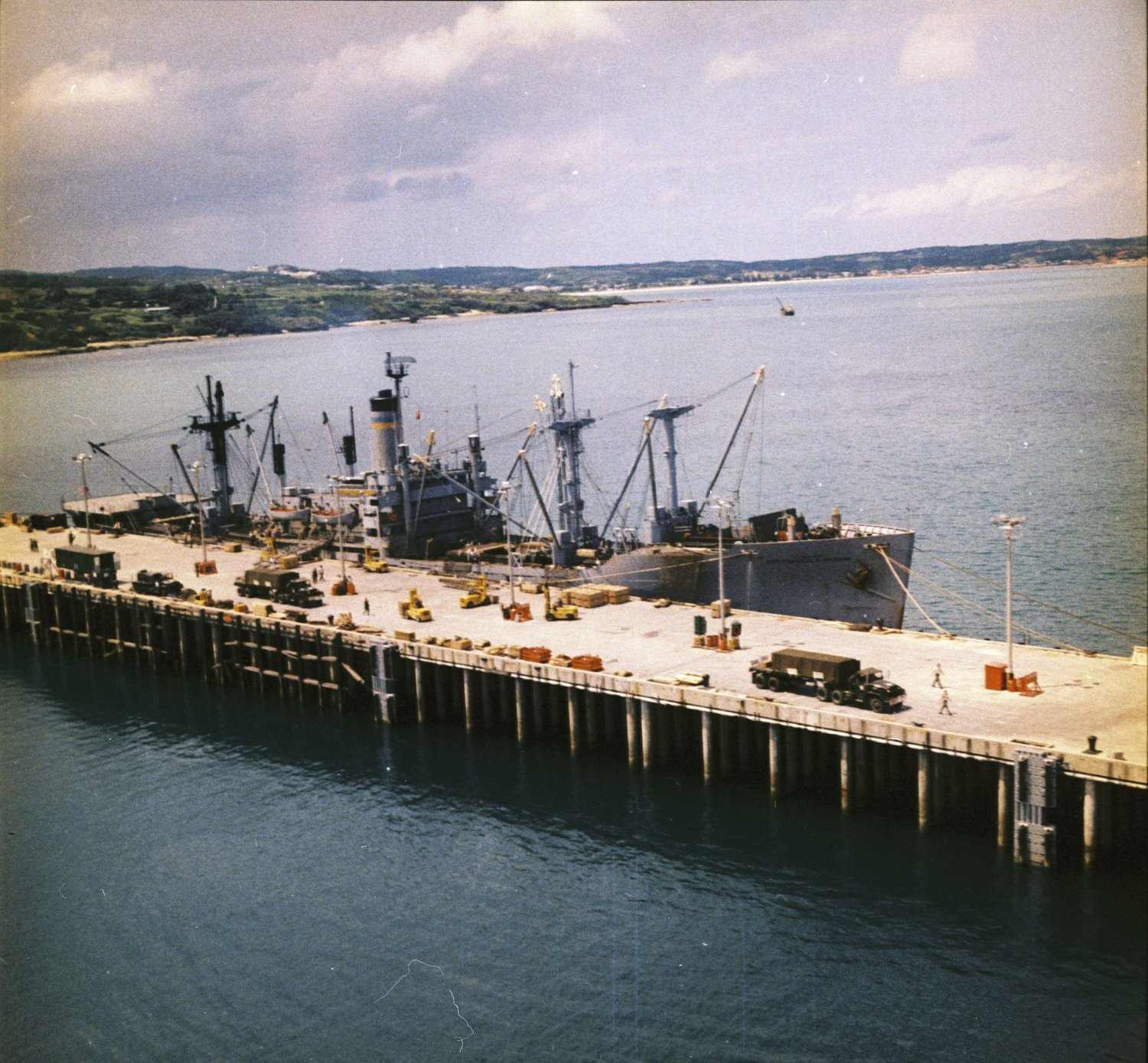
USNS Pvt. Francis X. McGraw

Wabash Victory was built by California Shipbuilding Corporation, Terminal Island, Los Angeles, California. Her keel was laid on 14 April 1945. She was launched on 9 June and delivered on 6 July. Built for the War Shipping Administration (WSA), she was operated under the management of Interocean Steamship Company. To the United States Army Transportation Corps in 1947 and renamed Pvt. Francis X. McGraw. To the United States Navy in 1950. Operated by the Military Sea Transportation Service. Laid up in the James River in 1974, she was scrapped in the United States later that year.

== Waco Victory ==
Waco Victory was built by California Shipbuilding Corporation. Her keel was laid on 12 May 1944. She was launched on 22 July and delivered on 14 October. Built for the WSA, she was operated under the management of American Mail Line. Laid up in Suisun Bay in 1946. Sold in 1947 to Compagnie Maritime Belge Lloyd Royale, Antwerp, Belgium and renamed Vinkt. She collided with the fishing boat Sonny Boy in the English Channel 7 nautical miles (13 km) off Dungeness, United Kingdom on 30 November 1947. Sonny Boy sank with the loss of one of her six crew. Sold in 1965 to United Transoceanic Shipping Corp., Liberia and renamed Hongkong Grace. She collided with the steamship Linda in 1967 and was severely damaged. Sold in 1968 to Universal Marine Corp., Liberia. She collided with the tanker Mina off Mossel Bay (34°40′S 22°35′E) on 16 May 1973 whilst on a voyage from Hong Kong to New York. She caught fire and was severely damaged. She put in to Cape Town, South Africa for temporary repairs. She was scrapped at Kaohsiung, Taiwan in 1973.

== Wake Forest Victory ==
Wake Forest Victory was built by Permanente Metals Corporation, Richmond, California. Her keel was laid on 28 February 1945. She was launched on 31 March and delivered on 10 May. Built for the WSA, she was operated under the management of Oliver J. Olson & Company. Laid up at Olympia, Washington in 1950. Scheduled to be returned to service in 1965 due to the Vietnam War, operated by the Military Sea Transportation Service. Driven from her moorings by Hurricane Betsy at New Orleans, Louisiana on 10 September 1965. She collided with Managua, Ondine and Witmarsum. Laid up at Mobile, Alabama. She was sold for scrapping in October 1972, and was scrapped at Mobile in 1973.

== Waltham Victory ==
Waltham Victory was built by Permanente Metals Corporation. Her keel was laid on 14 June 1945. She was launched on 25 July and delivered on 30 August. Built for the WSA, she was operated under the management of General Steamship Company. Laid up at Olympia in 1948. She arrived at Kaohsiung for scrapping in August 1972.

== Warwick Victory ==
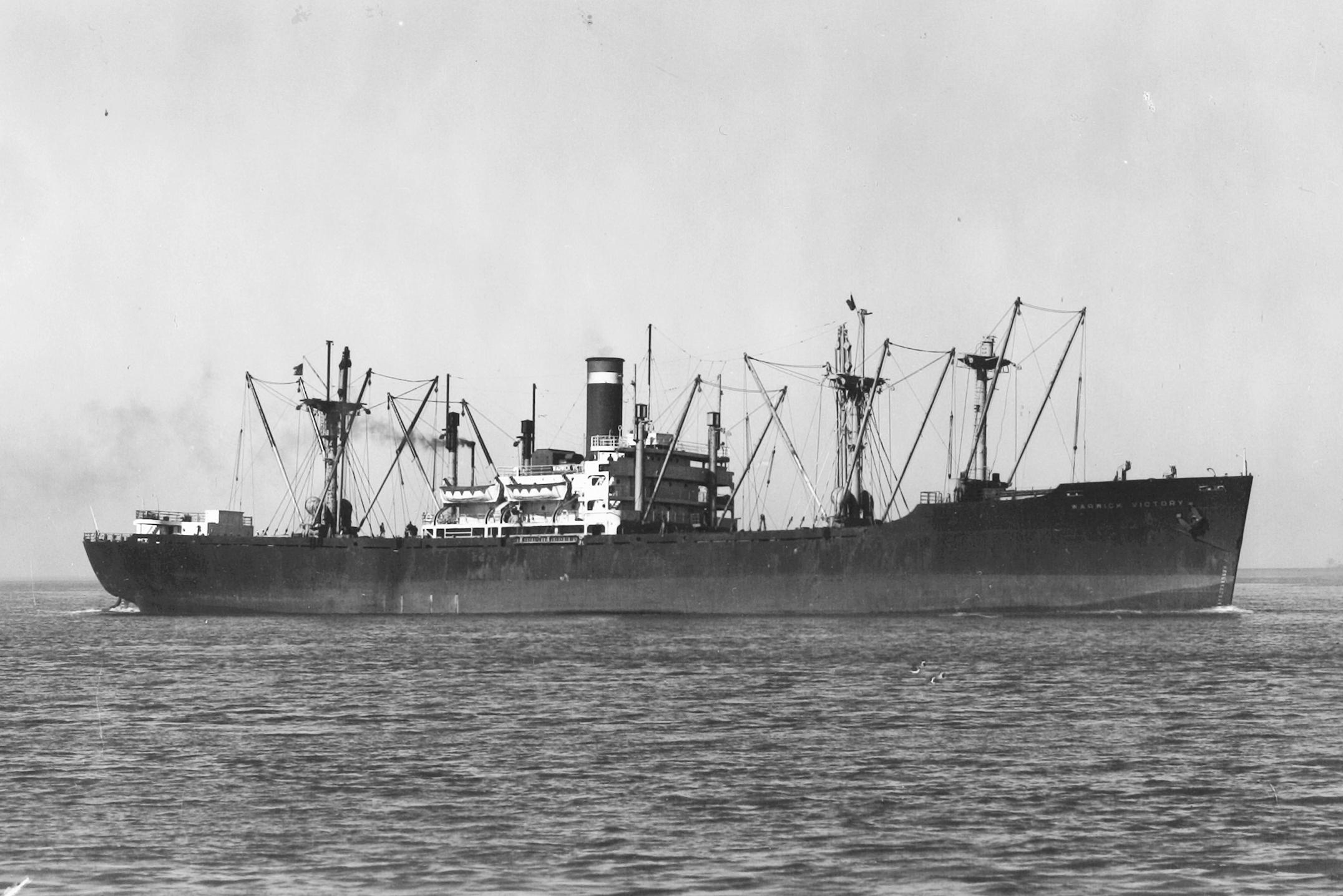
Warwick Victory

Warwick Victory was built by California Shipbuilding Corporation. Her keel was laid on 2 July 1945. She was launched on 10 September and delivered on 9 October. Built for the WSA, she was operated under the management of McCormick Steamship Company. Laid up at Wilmington, North Carolina in 1948. Later transferred to the Hudson River. Sold in 1966 to AEC Shipping Corp., New York and renamed U.S. Navigator. She was scrapped at Kaohsiung in January 1971.

== Waterbury Victory ==
Waterbury Victory was built by Bethlehem Fairfield Shipyard, Baltimore, Maryland. Her keel was laid on 9 June 1945. She was launched on 26 July and delivered on 31 August. Built for the WSA, she was operated under the management of North Atlantic & Gulf Steamship Company. Laid up in Suisun Bay in 1947. Sold later that year to N.V. Vereenigde Nederlandsche Scheepsvaarts Maatschappij, Den Haag, Netherlands and renamed Muiderkerk. Sold in 1965 to Concord Navigation Corp., Liberia and renamed Angelia Reflagged to Taiwan in 1968. Sold in 1969 to E. Hsiang Steamship Corp., Taiwan. She arrived at Kaohsiung for scrapping in February 1973.

== Waterville Victory ==
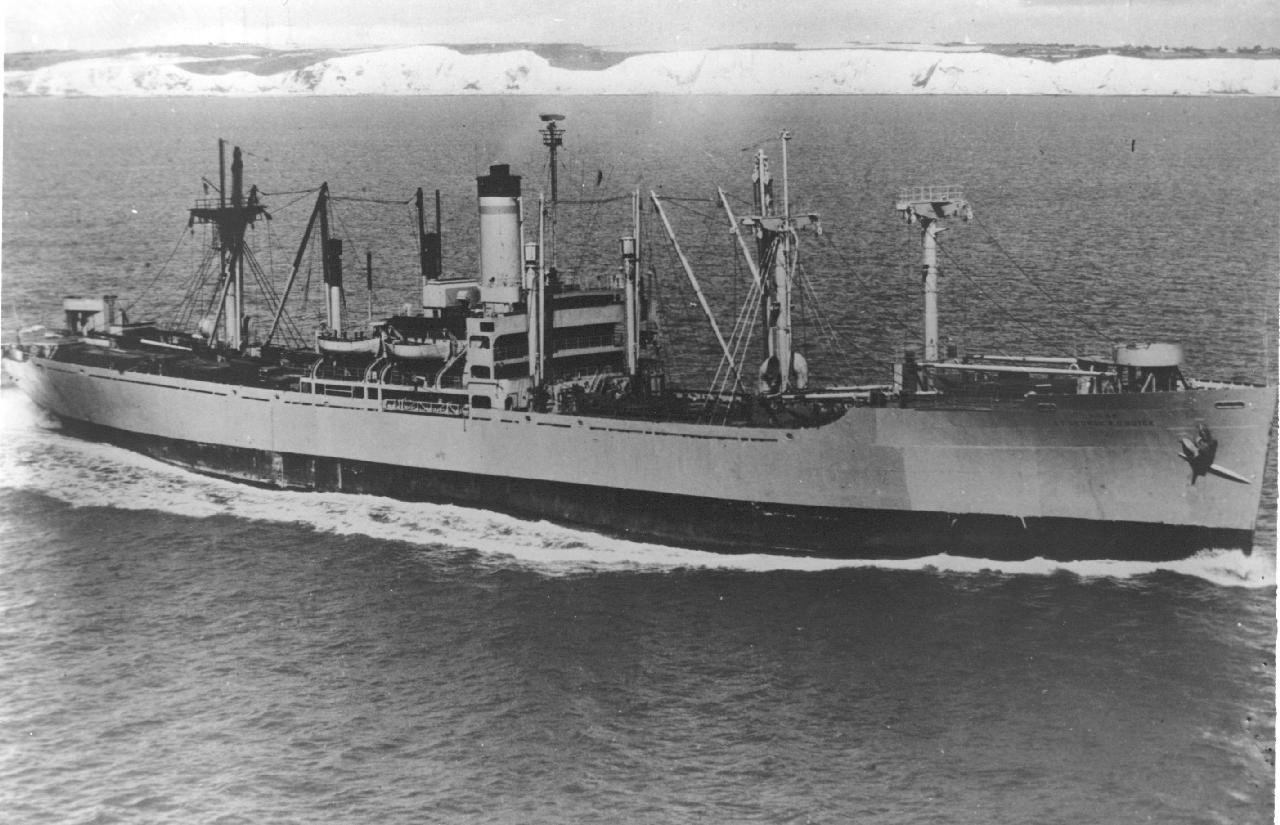
USNS Lt. George W. G. Boyce

Waterville Victory was a troop transport built by Bethlehem Fairfield Shipyard. Her keel was laid on 13 July 1945. She was launched on 19 September and delivered on 15 October. Built for the WSA, she was operated under the management of Parry Navigation Company. To the United States Army Transportation Corps in 1947 and renamed Lt. George W. G. Boyce. To the United States Navy in 1950. Operated by the Military Sea Transportation Service. Laid up in Suisun Bay in 1973. She was scrapped at Portland, Oregon in 1974.

== Waycross Victory ==
Waycross Victory was a troop transport built by Bethlehem Fairfield Shipyard. Her keel was laid on 1 June 1945. She was launched on 20 July and delivered on 25 August. Built for the WSA, she was operated under the management of A. H. Bull & Company. Laid up in the Hudson River in 1946. Sold in 1947 to Compagnie Royale Belge-Argentina, Antwerp and renamed Luxembourg. Sold in 1951 to Armament Deppe S.A., Antwerp. Sold in 1962 to Compagnie Maritime Belge, Antwerp. Operated under the management of Lloyd Royal. Sold in 1965 to United Transoceanic Shipping Corp. and renamed Hongkong Honour. Sold in 1966 to Universal Marine Corp., Liberia. She was scrapped at Gadani Beach, Pakistan in 1975.

== Wayne Victory ==
Wayne Victory was built by California Shipbuilding Corporation. Her keel was laid on 3 April 1945. She was launched on 28 May and delivered on 23 June. Built for the WSA, she was operated under the management of Alcoa Steamship Company. Laid up at Astoria, Oregon in 1953. Returned to service in 1966 due to the Vietnam War. Laid up in the James River in 1973. She was scrapped at Brownsville, Texas in 2002.

== Webster Victory ==
Webster Victory was a troop transport built by Bethlehem Fairfield Shipyard. Her keel was laid on 14 May 1945. She was launched on 26 June and delivered on 30 July. Built for the WSA, she was operated under the management of United States Navigation Company. Laid up in Suisun Bay in 1947. Sold later that year to Koninklijke Rotterdamsche Lloyd, Rotterdam, Netherlands and renamed Sarangan. Sold in 1963 to Oceanic Shipping Co., Monrovia, Liberia and renamed Westwind. Sold in 1970 to Great Pacific Marine Industries, Panama and renamed Oceania. She arrived at Kaohsiung for scrapping in September 1972.

== Wellesley Victory ==
Wellesley Victory was built by Oregon Shipbuilding Corporation, Portland, Oregon. Her keel was laid on 2 February 1945. She was launched on 16 March and delivered on 13 April. Built for the WSA, she was operated under the management of Pacific-Atlantic Steamship Company. Laid up in the James River in 1948. Sold in 1963 to Blidberg Rothchild Company, New York. She was scrapped at Kaohsiung in August 1971.

== Wesleyan Victory ==
Wesleyan Victory was built by Permanente Metals Corporation. Her keel was laid on 16 January 1945. She was launched on 28 February and delivered on 29 March. Built for the WSA, she was operated under the management of Sudden & Christenson. Laid up in the Hudson River in 1948. Later transferred to the James River. She was scrapped at Castellón de la Plana, Spain in 1985.

== Westbrook Victory ==
Westbrook Victory was a troop transport built by Bethlehem Fairfield Shipyard. Her keel was laid on 23 February 1945. She was launched on 17 April and delivered on 2 May. Built for the WSA, she was operated under the management of A. L. Burbank & Company, Ltd. Laid up in the James River in 1946. Sold in 1947 to South African Marine Corp., Cape Town, Union of South Africa and renamed Vergelegen. Renamed South African Victory in 1961. She collided with a fishing vessel off the coast of Natal on 4 July 1962. the fishing vessel was taken in tow, but sank. South African Victory rescued her sixteen crew. Renamed S.A. Victory in 1966. She was scrapped at Kaohsiung in November 1969.

== Westerly Victory ==
Westerly Victory was a troop transport built by Bethlehem Fairfield Shipyard. Her keel was laid on 9 September 1944. She was launched on 31 October and delivered on 28 November. Built for the WSA, she was operated under the management of States Marine Line. Sold in 1947 to South African Marine Corp. and renamed Morgenster. She collided with the ferry Hinderton in the River Mersey on 1 November 1954. Renamed South African Venture in 1961, then S.A. Venture in 1966. Sold in 1968 to International Export Lines, Nassau, Bahamas and renamed Hongkong Weaver. She was scrapped at Kaohsiung in June 1972.

== Western Reserve Victory ==
Western Reserve Victory was built by Oregon Shipbuilding Corporation. Her keel was laid on 9 March 1945. She was launched on 20 April and delivered on 18 May. Built for the WSA, she was operated under the management of Alaska Packers' Association. Sold in 1946 to Compania Argentina de Navigation Dodero, Buenos Aires, Argentina and renamed Overo. Sold in 1949 to Flota Argentina de Navigation de Ultramar, Buenos Aires. Sold in 1961 to Empresa Lineas Argentinas, Buenos Aires. She was scrapped at Campana, Argentina in 1972.

== West Lynn Victory ==
West Lynn Victory was built by Oregon Shipbuilding Corporation. Her keel was laid on 19 November 1944. She was launched on 22 December and delivered on 22 January 1945. Built for the WSA, she was operated under the management of United States Lines. Laid up at Wilmington, North Carolina in 1948. Later transferred to Olympia. She arrived at Kaohsiung for scrapping in August 1972.

== Westminster Victory ==
Westminster Victory was a troop transport built by Oregon Shipbuilding Corporation. Her keel was laid on 30 January 1945. She was launched on 13 March and delivered on 11 April. Built for the WSA, she was operated under the management of R. A. Nicol & Company. Sold in 1946 to Compagnie Maritime Belge Lloyd Royale and renamed Steenstraete. She caught fire at Beira Portuguese East Africa on 28 June 1953, damaging four other ships and with the loss of 20 stevedores. Sold in 1965 to United Transoceanic Shipping Corp. and renamed Hongkong Amber. Sold in 1968 to Universal Marine Corp. She was scrapped at Kaohsiung in 1973.

== Wheaton Victory ==
Wheaton Victory was a troop transport built by California Shipbuilding Corporation. Her keel was laid on 27 January 1945. She was launched on 22 March and delivered on 14 April. Built for the WSA, she was operated under the management of Marine Transport Line. Sold in 1947 to Van Nievelt, Goudriaan & Co., Rotterdam and renamed Alpherat. Sold in 1963 to China Merchants Steam Navigation Co., Keelung, Taiwan and renamed Hai Fu. She ran aground at Honolulu, Hawaii on 26 October 1963 whilst on a voyage from Houston to Kaohsiung. She was later refloated and towed in to Hawaii. Declared a constructive total loss. She was towed to Kaohsiung and scrapped there in 1965.

== Whitman Victory ==
Whitman Victory was built by Oregon Shipbuilding Corporation. Her keel was laid on 13 March 1945. She was launched on 24 April and delivered on 26 May. Built for the WSA, she was operated under the management of American Mail Line. Sold in 1946 to Holland-Amerika Lijn, Rotterdam and renamed Arkeldijk. Renamed Arkeldyk in 1954. Sold in 1966 to Athlitis Compania Navigation, Piraeus, Greece and renamed Athlitis. She was scrapped at Kaohsiung in September 1969.

== Whittier Victory ==
Whittier Victory was built by California Shipbuilding Corporation. Her keel was laid on 27 April 1945. She was launched on 20 June and delivered on 18 July. Built for the WSA, she was operated under the management of Moore-McCormack Lines. Laid up at Mobile in 1948. Later transferred to Beaumont. She was scrapped at Tuxpan, Mexico in 1993.

== Willamette Victory ==
Willamette Victory was built by Oregon Shipbuilding Corporation. Her keel was laid on 15 February 1945. She was launched on 30 March and delivered on 25 April. Built for the WSA, she was operated under the management of Pacific-Atlantic Steamship Company. Sold in 1951 to American President Lines, San Francisco, California and renamed President Garfield. To the United States Department of Commerce in 1958 and renamed Willamette Victory. Laid up in Suisun Bay. Returned to service in 1966 due to the Vietnam War. Operated under the management of American President Lines. She was scrapped in Kaohsiung in 1974.

== William and Mary Victory ==
William and Mary Victory was a troop transport built by Bethlehem Fairfield Shipyard. Her keel was laid on 6 March 1945. She was launched on 20 April and delivered on 15 May. Built for the WSA, she was operated under the management of International Freighting Corporation. Laid up in the James River in 1946. Sold in 1947 to Compania Argentina de Navigation Dodero7 and renamed Mendoza. Sold in 1949 to Flota Argentina de Navigation de Ultramar, Buenos Aires. Rebuilt as a passenger ship in 1952. Sold in 1961 to Empresa Lineas Argentinas, Buenos Aires and converted back to a cargo ship. She was scrapped at Campana in 1972.

== Williams Victory ==
Williams Victory was a troop transport built by Bethlehem Fairfield Shipyard. Her keel was laid on 16 March 1945. She was launched on 7 May and delivered on 30 May. Built for the WSA, she was operated under the management of Smith & Johnson Co. Sold in 1947 to Koninklijke Rotterdamsche Lloyd and renamed Salatiga. Sold in 1063 to Magellan Strait Development Co., Monrovia and renamed Salamat. She was scrapped at La Spezia, Italy in June 1969.

== Wilson Victory ==
Wilson Victory was a troop transport built by Bethlehem Fairfield Shipyard. Her keel was laid on 22 May 1945. She was launched on 6 July and delivered on 6 August. Built for the WSA, she was operated under the management of Cosmopolitan Shipping Company. To the United States Army Transportation Corps in 1947 and renamed Pvt. Sadao S. Munemori. Laid up in Suisun Bay in 1949. To the United States Navy in 1950. Operated by the Military Sea Transportation Service. To the United States Department of Commerce in 1952. Laid up at Olympia. She was scrapped at Portland, Oregon in 1970.

== Winchester Victory ==
Winchester Victory was a troop transport built by Bethlehem Fairfield Shipyard. Her keel was laid on 18 January 1945. She was launched on 6 March and delivered on 30 March. Built for the WSA, she was operated under the management of J. H. Winchester & Company. To the Ministry of Transport, London, United Kingdom in 1946. Operated under the management of British India Steam Navigation Company. She suffered boiiler problems in the Mediterranean Sea on 6 August 1946 whilst on a voyage from Alexandria, Egypt to Malta. HMS Shoreham and HMS St Austell Bay were sent to her assistance. To the United States Maritime Commission (USMC) in 1947. Sold later that year to Stoomvaart Maatschappij Nederland, Amsterdam, Netherlands and renamed Lawak. Sold in 1963 to Orient-Mid East Great Lakes Service, Piraeus and renamed Orient Liner. To Orient Mid-East Lines, Piraeus in 1964. She was scrapped at Kaohsiung in August 1971.

== Winthrop Victory ==
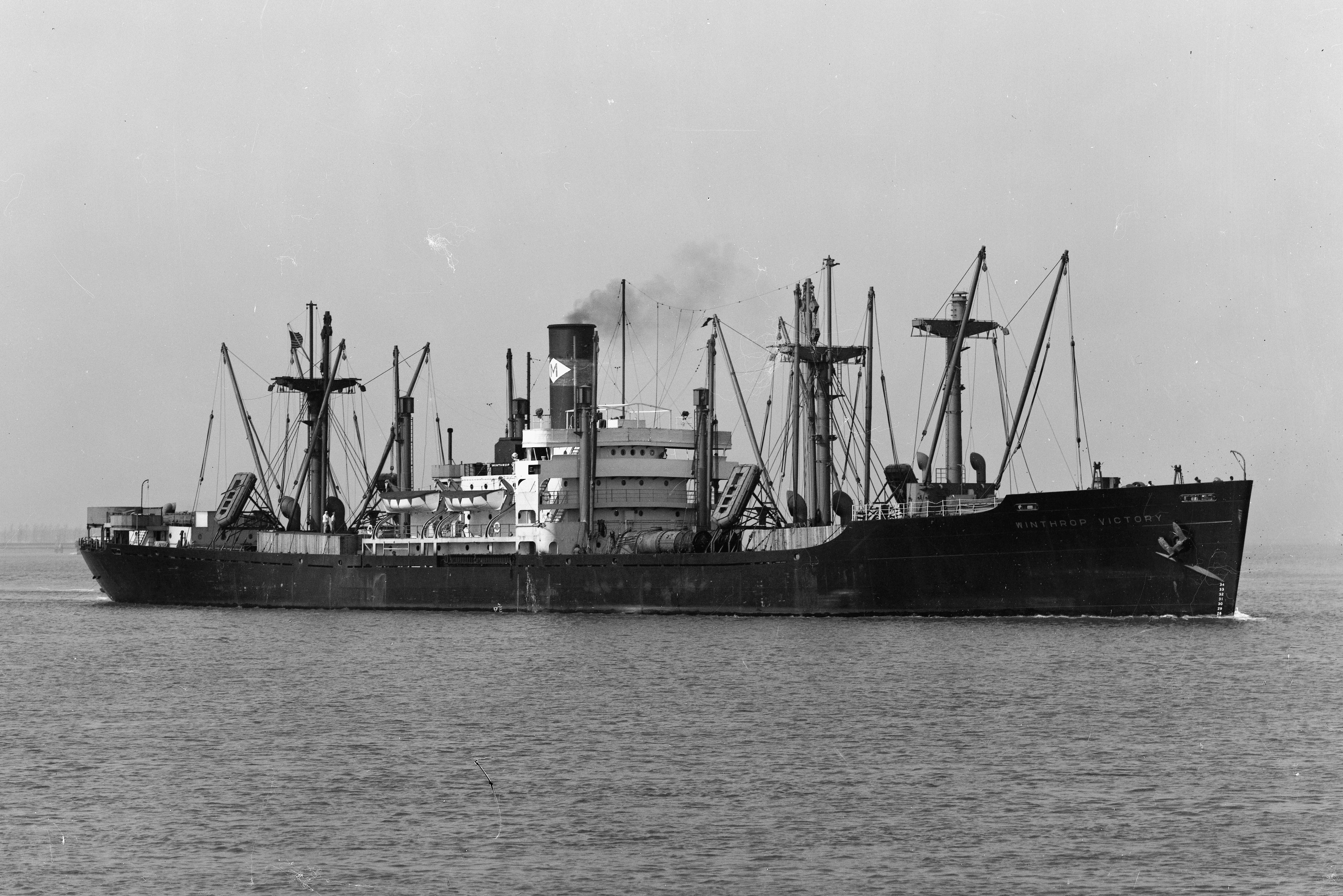
Winthrop Victory

Winthrop Victory was built by California Shipbuilding Corporation. Her keel was laid on 22 March 1945. She was launched on 17 May and delivered on 11 June. Built for the WSA, she was operated under the management of Marine Transport Line. Laid up in Suisun Bay in 1948. Returned to service in 1966 due to the Vietnam War. Operated under the management of Pacific Far East Line. Laid up in Suisun Bay in 1973. She was awaiting disposal in 2004.

== Woodbridge Victory ==
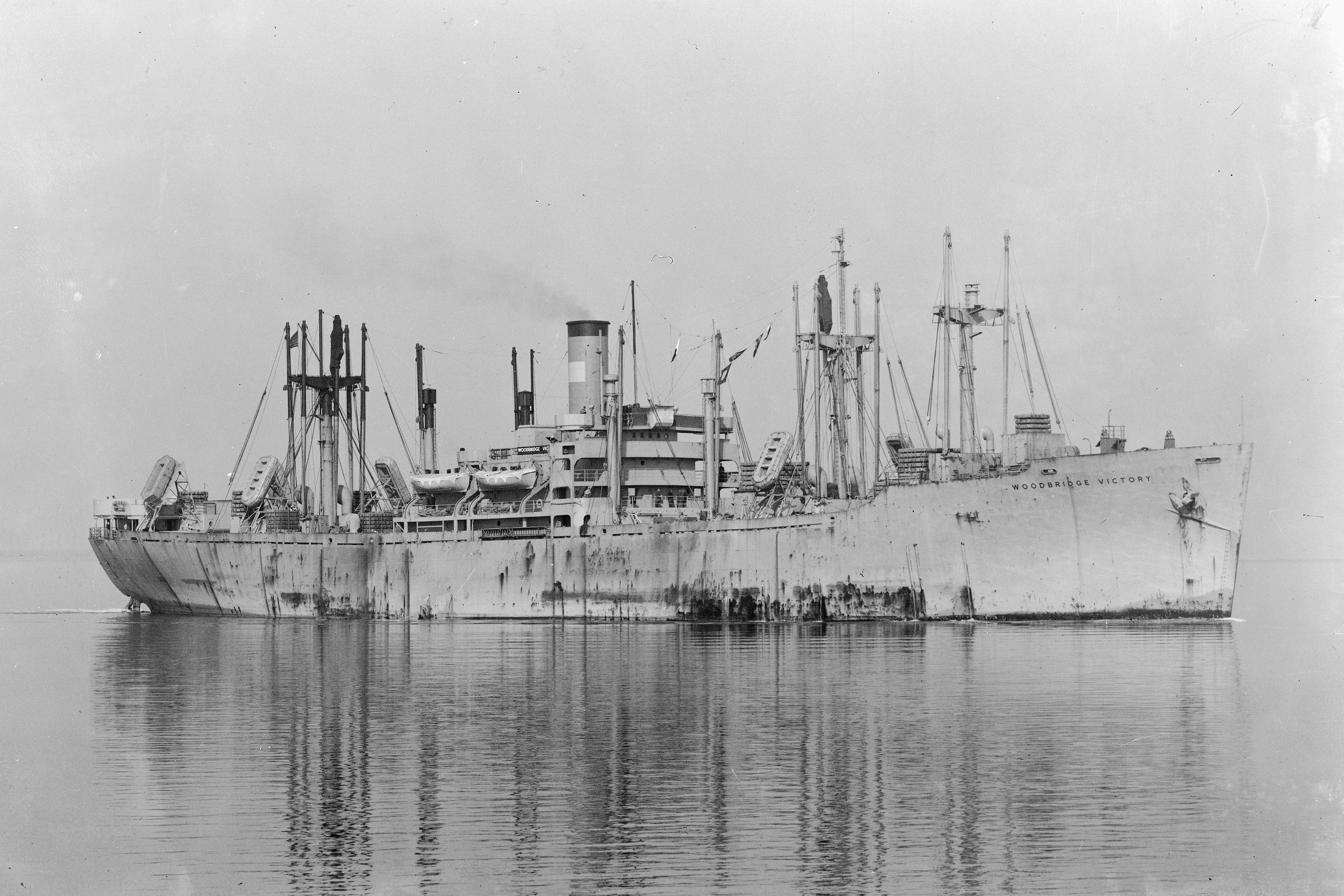
Woodbridge Victory

Woodbridge Victory was a troop transport built by Bethlehem Fairfield Shipyard. Her keel was laid on 10 February 1945. She was launched on 29 March and delivered on 24 April. Built for the WSA, she was operated under the management of Isbrandtsen Steamship Co. Laid up in the James River in 1946. Sold in 1947 to Armament Deppe, Antwerp and renamed Christian Sheid. In June 1949, a jaguar escaped from its cage whilst it was being transported from Africa to a European port. She put in to Las Palmas, Canary Islands. The jaguar was shot dead. Sold in 1962 to Compagnie Maritime Belge. Sold in 1964 to United Transoceanic Shipping Corp. and renamed Hongkong Fair. Sold in 1966 to Universal Marine Corp. She was scrapped at Kaohsiung in October 1972.

== Woodstock Victory ==
Woodstock Victory was built by Bethlehem Fairfield Shipyard. Her keel was laid on 10 July 1944. She was launched on 23 September and delivered on 27 October. Built for the WSA, she was operated under the management of American Export Line. Laid up in the Hudson River in 1948. Later transferred to Suisun Bay. She was scrapped at Kaohsiung in 1984.

== Wooster Victory ==
Wooster Victory was a troop transport built by California Shipbuilding Corporation. Her keel was laid on 9 February 1945. She was launched on 2 April and delivered on 25 April. Built for the WSA, she was operated under the management of General Steamship Company. Laid up in the James River in 1946. Chartered to Compania Argentina de Navigation de Ultramar in 1947 and renamed Ultramar. Reflagged to Panama. Sold in 1948 to Alvion Steamship Corp., Panama. Sold in 1950 to Sitmar Società Italiana Trasporti Marittima, Rome, Italy. Converted to a passenger ship. Now 8,254 GRT. Sold in 1957 to Compania Trasatlantica Española, Barcelona, Spain and renamed Montserrat. A rebuilt saw her increase to 9,001 GRT. In August 1970, she suffered serious electrical failure and boiler damage 1,200 nautical miles (2,200 km) off Barbados. Her 660 passengers were taken off by the Victory ship Begona. Montserrat was adrift for four days before a tug managed to take her in tow for Curaçao, Netherlands Antilles, where she was repaired. She was scrapped at Castellón de la Plana in 1973.

== Xavier Victory ==
Xavier Victory was built by Permanente Metals Corporation. Her keel was laid on 21 January 1945. She was launched on 7 March and delivered on 31 March. Built for the WSA, she was operated under the management of Oliver J. Olson & Company. Laid up in Suisun Bay in 1948. Returned to service in 1966 due to the Vietnam War. Operated under the management of Matson Navigation Company. Laid up in Suisun Bay in 1973. She was scrapped at Kaohsiung in 1984.

== Yale Victory ==
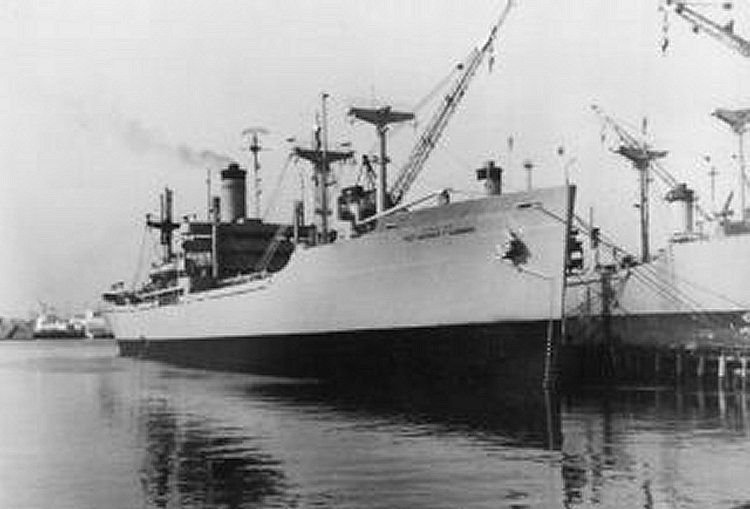
USNS Sgt. Archer T. Gammon

Yale Victory was built by Permanente Metals Corporation. Her keel was laid on 13 December 1944. She was launched on 31 January 1945 and delivered on 24 February. Built for the WSA, she was operated under the management of Olympic Steamship Company. To the United States Army Transportation Corps in 1947 and renamed Sgt. Archer T. Gammon. To the United States Navy in 1950. She was scrapped at Kaohsiung in 1974.

== Yugoslavia Victory ==
Yugoslavia Victory was built by Oregon Shipbuilding Corporation. Her keel was laid on 5 February 1944. She was launched on 15 April and delivered on 7 May. Built for the WSA, she was operated under the management of Pacific Far East Line. Laid up at Mobile in 1948. Sold in 1965 to Panoceanic Tankers Corp., New York. Sold in 1971 to Compania Transatlantica S.A., Panama and renamed Joann. She was scrapped at Kaohsiung in March 1971.

== Zanesville Victory ==
Zanesville Victory was a troop transport built by Bethlehem Fairfield Shipyard. Her keel was laid on 18 November 1944. She was launched on 15 January 1945 and delivered on 12 February. Built for the WSA, she was operated under the management of American West African Line. Laid up in Suisun Bay in 1946. She was scrapped at Portland, Oregon in 1976.
