= SS Howell E. Jackson =

World War II Liberty ship of the United States

History

United States
- Name: Howell E. Jackson
- Namesake: Howell E. Jackson
- Owner: War Shipping Administration (WSA)
- Operator: Marine Transport Line
- Ordered: as type (EC2-S-C1) hull, MC hull 1498
- Builder: J.A. Jones Construction, Brunswick, Georgia
- Cost: $1.851.609
- Yard number: 114
- Way number: 4
- Laid down: 22 May 1943
- Launched: 6 September 1943
- Sponsored by: Nobie Ramspeck
- Completed: 25 September 1943
- Identification: Call Signal: KIRA
- Fate: Laid up in National Defense Reserve Fleet, Wilmington, North Carolina, 7 June 1948; Sold for scrapping, 9 August 1962

General characteristics
- Class & type: Liberty ship; type EC2-S-C1, standard
- Tonnage: 10,865 LT DWT; 7,176 GRT
- Displacement: 3,380 long tons (3,434 t) (light); 14,245 long tons (14,474 t) (max)
- Length: 441 feet 6 inches (135 m) oa; 416 feet (127 m) pp; 427 feet (130 m) lwl
- Beam: 57 feet (17 m)
- Draft: 27 ft 9.25 in (8.4646 m)
- Installed power: 2 × Oil fired 450 °F (232 °C) boilers, operating at 220 psi (1,500 kPa); 2,500 hp (1,900 kW)
- Propulsion: 1 × triple-expansion steam engine, (manufactured by General Machinery Corp., Hamilton, Ohio); 1 × screw propeller
- Speed: 11.5 knots (21.3 km/h; 13.2 mph)
- Capacity: 562,608 cubic feet (15,931 m^{3}) (grain); 499,573 cubic feet (14,146 m^{3}) (bale)
- Complement: 38–62 USMM; 21–40 USNAG
- Armament: Varied by ship; Bow-mounted 3-inch (76 mm)/50-caliber gun; Stern-mounted 4-inch (102 mm)/50-caliber gun; 2–8 × single 20-millimeter (0.79 in) Oerlikon anti-aircraft (AA) cannons and/or, 2–8 × 37-millimeter (1.46 in) M1 AA guns

SS Howell E. Jackson was a Liberty ship built in the United States during World War II. She was named after Howell E. Jackson, an Associate Justice of the Supreme Court of the United States and a United States senator from Tennessee.

== Construction ==
Howell E. Jackson was laid down on 22 May 1943, under a United States Maritime Commission (MARCOM) contract, MC hull 1498, by J.A. Jones Construction, Brunswick, Georgia; sponsored by Nobie Ramspeck, wife of House Majority Whip Robert Ramspeck, and launched on 6 September 1943.

== History ==
She was allocated to Marine Transport Line, on 25 September 1943. On 7 June 1948, she was laid up in the National Defense Reserve Fleet in Wilmington, North Carolina. On 9 August 1962, she was sold to North American Smelting Company, for $45,025, for scrapping, she was delivered on 29 August 1962.

== Bibliography ==
- "Jones Construction, Brunswick GA". ShipbuildingHistory.com. 13 October 2010.
- "Liberty Ships – World War II".
- Maritime Administration. "Howell E. Jackson". Ship History Database Vessel Status Card. U.S. Department of Transportation, Maritime Administration. Archived from the original on 12 December 2019.
- Davies, James (May 2004). "Specifications (As-Built)" (PDF). p. 23.
- "SS Howell E. Jackson".
