= SS E. Kirby Smith =

Liberty ship of WWII

History

United States
- Name: E. Kirby Smith
- Namesake: E. Kirby Smith
- Owner: War Shipping Administration (WSA)
- Operator: Marine Transport Lines, Inc.
- Ordered: as type (EC2-S-C1) hull, MC hull 1519
- Builder: J.A. Jones Construction, Panama City, Florida
- Cost: $2,330,989
- Yard number: 1
- Way number: 1
- Laid down: 9 July 1942
- Launched: 30 December 1942
- Sponsored by: Mrs. Raymond A. Jones
- Completed: 3 March 1943
- Identification: Call Signal: KIFA
- Fate: Laid up in the James River Reserve Fleet, Lee Hall, Virginia, 23 May 1946; Sold for scrapping, 18 July 1956

General characteristics
- Class & type: Liberty ship; type EC2-S-C1, standard
- Tonnage: 10,865 LT DWT; 7,176 GRT
- Displacement: 3,380 long tons (3,434 t) (light); 14,245 long tons (14,474 t) (max)
- Length: 441 feet 6 inches (135 m) oa; 416 feet (127 m) pp; 427 feet (130 m) lwl
- Beam: 57 feet (17 m)
- Draft: 27 ft 9.25 in (8.4646 m)
- Installed power: 2 × Oil fired 450 °F (232 °C) boilers, operating at 220 psi (1,500 kPa); 2,500 hp (1,900 kW)
- Propulsion: 1 × triple-expansion steam engine, (manufactured by Alabama Marine Engine Co., Birmingham, Alabama); 1 × screw propeller
- Speed: 11.5 knots (21.3 km/h; 13.2 mph)
- Capacity: 562,608 cubic feet (15,931 m^{3}) (grain); 499,573 cubic feet (14,146 m^{3}) (bale)
- Complement: 38–62 USMM; 21–40 USNAG
- Armament: Varied by ship; Bow-mounted 3-inch (76 mm)/50-caliber gun; Stern-mounted 4-inch (102 mm)/50-caliber gun; 2–8 × single 20-millimeter (0.79 in) Oerlikon anti-aircraft (AA) cannons and/or, 2–8 × 37-millimeter (1.46 in) M1 AA guns

SS E. Kirby Smith was a Liberty ship built in the United States during World War II. She was named after E. Kirby Smith, a career United States Army officer who fought in the Mexican–American War, and for the Confederacy in the Civil War, rising to the rank of General in the CSA.

== Construction ==
E. Kirby Smith was laid down on 9 July 1942, under a United States Maritime Commission (MARCOM) contract, MC hull 1519, by J.A. Jones Construction, Panama City, Florida; sponsored by Mrs. Raymond A. Jones, wife of Raymond A. Jones, vice president and general manager, JAJCC, she was launched on 30 December 1942.

== History ==
She was allocated to Marine Transport Lines, on 3 March 1943. On 23 May 1946, she was laid up in the James River Reserve Fleet, Lee Hall, Virginia. On 27 May 1954, she was withdrawn from the fleet to be loaded with grain under the "Grain Program 1954", she returned loaded on 21 June 1954. On 16 March 1956, she was withdrawn to be unload, she returned on empty 23 April 1956. On 18 July 1956, she was sold for $147,777.77 to Boston Metals Co., to be scrapped. She was removed from the fleet on 25 July 1956.

== Bibliography ==
- "Jones Construction, Panama City FL". ShipbuildingHistory.com. 13 October 2010.
- Maritime Administration. "E. Kirby Smith". Ship History Database Vessel Status Card. U.S. Department of Transportation, Maritime Administration.
- Davies, James (May 2004). "Specifications (As-Built)" (PDF). p. 23.
- "SS E. Kirby Smith".
