= USS Pondera =

Attack transport ship in United States Navy

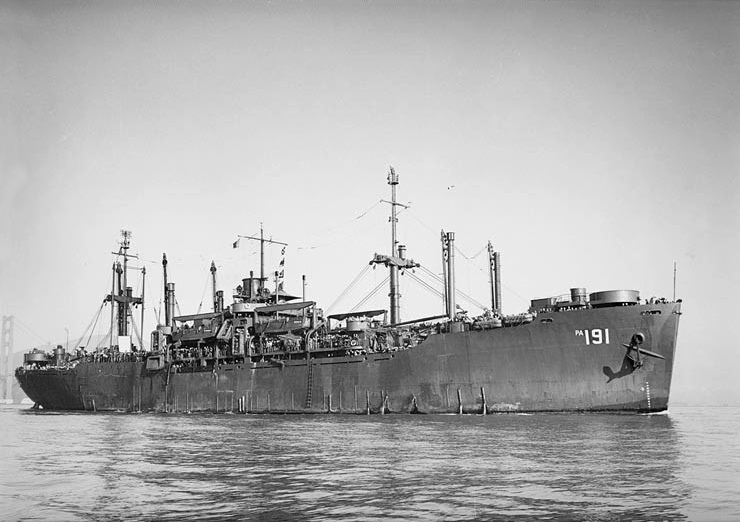
- USS Pondera (APA-191) in San Francisco Bay, bringing troops home in Operation Magic Carpet, late 1945 or early '46

History

United States
- Name: USS Pondera
- Namesake: Pondera County, Montana
- Ordered: as type VC2-S-AP5; MCV hull 659
- Laid down: 28 April 1944
- Launched: 27 July 1944
- Commissioned: 24 September 1944
- Decommissioned: 6 April 1946
- Stricken: 19 June 1946
- Fate: Scrapped, 1974

General characteristics
- Displacement: 14,833 (full load)
- Length: 455 ft 0 in (138.68 m)
- Beam: 62 ft 0 in (18.90 m)
- Draught: 28 ft 1 in (8.56 m)
- Speed: 17 knots
- Capacity: 150,000 cu. ft, 2,900 tons
- Complement: 56 Officers 480 Enlisted
- Armament: one 5 in (130 mm) gun mount, twelve 40 mm gun mounts, ten 20 mm gun mounts

USS Pondera (APA-191) was a Haskell-class attack transport acquired by the U.S. Navy during World War II for the task of transporting troops to and from combat areas.

== World War II service ==
Pondera (APA–191), built under United States Maritime Commission contact (MCV hull 659), was laid down by the Kaiser Shipbuilding Co., Vancouver, Washington, 28 April 1944; launched 27 July 1944; sponsored by Miss Elinor C. Gottlieb; delivered to the Navy and commissioned 24 September 1944.

=== Landing Seabee’s and troops and their equipment on Okinawa ===
Following shakedown, Pondera remained in California waters, training pre-commissioning crews for APAs, until 23 January 1945. Two weeks of amphibious training followed and in February she departed San Francisco, California, for Hawaii. After further amphibious training she carried the 81st Construction Battalion to Okinawa, anchoring off Hagushi 26 April. Later shifting to Nakagusuku Wan, she disembarked troops there 3–4 May and during the night assisted USS Carina (AK-74), damaged by a suicide boat. On the 8th she departed, with casualties embarked, for Saipan, whence she sailed to San Francisco, California.

=== End-of-war "mopping-up" operations ===
She completed a second troop lift to the Far East, Leyte, in July, and was en route on her third transpacific run when the war ended. Arriving at Ulithi 25 August, she sailed to Guam, disembarked half of her troops there, then continued on to Okinawa to discharge the remainder. In mid-September she took on men of the XXIV Corps and on the 24th debarked them at Jinsen, Korea. In October she carried further elements of that Corps to Korea, then, after replenishing at Manila, joined TransRon 17, 8 November, at Hong Kong, to lift troops of the 8th Chinese Nationalist Army to Qingdao. Completing that mission 16 November, Pondera reported for Operation Magic Carpet duty and on 20 November arrived at San Diego, California, with units of the 5th Marine Division. She completed her second and last "Magic Carpet" run at San Francisco 9 March 1946 and ten days later got underway for the U.S. East Coast and inactivation.

== Post-war decommissioning ==
Arriving at Norfolk, Virginia, 6 April, she decommissioned and was transferred to the United States Maritime Commission 6 June 1946. Struck from the Navy List 19 June 1946, she was laid up in the James River, Virginia, berthing area, National Defense Reserve Fleet, where she remained into 1974 when she was sold for scrapping.

== Military awards and honors ==
Pondera earned one battle star during World War II.
