= SS Marine Sulphur Queen =

American commercial tanker ship that disappeared in 1963

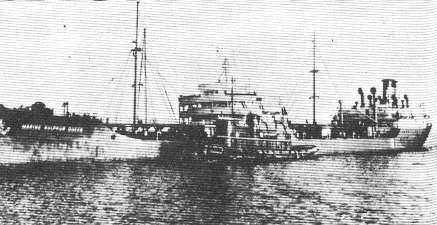
- An image of SS Marine Sulphur Queen.

History

United States
- Name: SS Esso New Haven
- Owner: Bethlehem Steel Company
- Builder: Sun Shipbuilding & Drydock Co.
- Yard number: 407
- Launched: 8 March 1944
- Renamed: SS Marine Sulphur Queen, 1960
- Identification: 1944: US Official Number: 245295; Code letters:KWPO
- Fate: Went missing southwest of Florida on or after 4 February 1963

General characteristics
- Class & type: T2 tanker
- Tonnage: 10,642 GRT; 6,419 NRT
- Length: 504 ft 0 in (153.62 m)
- Beam: 68.2 ft 0 in (20.79 m)
- Depth: 93.2 ft 0 in (28.41 m)
- Crew: 39

SS Marine Sulphur Queen, formerly Esso New Haven, was a T2 tanker converted to carry molten sulphur. It is notable for its disappearance in 1963 near the southern coast of Florida, taking the lives of 39 crewmen.

In the investigation, the Coast Guard determined that the ship was unsafe and not seaworthy, and never should have sailed. The final report suggested four causes of the disaster, all due to poor design and maintenance of the ship. The loss of the ship was the subject of lengthy litigation between the owner and families of the missing men.

Despite the clear cause of the disaster and its last known position being off Florida in the Gulf of Mexico, an inaccurate and incomplete version of the ship's disappearance is often used to justify Bermuda Triangle conspiracies.

== History ==
The vessel, originally named SS Esso New Haven, was built by Sun Shipbuilding and Dry Dock Company, Chester, Pennsylvania, in March 1944, as one of many T2 tankers built to carry and transport oil. In 1960, she was placed in dry dock by Bethlehem Steel Company, Sparrows Point, Maryland, converted to carrying a cargo of molten sulphur, and given a name change to Marine Sulphur Queen. In order to carry out the planned function of carrying molten sulphur, a continuous, independent tank 306 feet (93 m) long, 30 feet 6 inches (9.30 m) wide and 33 feet (10 m) high was constructed out of the original holds, necessitating the removal of all transverse bulkheads in the original centerline tanks and modifying the internal structure; this tank in turn was divided into four smaller tanks internally. A void surrounded the tank on all sides, leaving a 2-foot (0.61 m) clearance on the sides and bottom, with three feet left between the top and the ship's weather deck. A steam system was installed throughout to maintain the molten sulphur at roughly 255 °F (124 °C).

The ship's last voyage began on 2 February 1963 out of Beaumont, Texas, with a cargo of sulphur weighing 15,260 tons. On 4 February, near Florida, an ordinary radio message was sent by a crewman, giving the position of the ship at 25°45′N 86°00′W, roughly 200 miles west of the Florida Keys. Marine Sulphur Queen was listed as missing on 6 February. A search of the Straits of Florida where the ship was believed to have gone down was called off after 19 days, after yielding life preservers and some debris, but no trace of the ship or the 39 men aboard her. At the time of her 4 February position, she was in rough, nearly-following seas of 16 feet (4.9 m), with northerly winds of 25–46 knots in a winter storm.

== Investigation ==
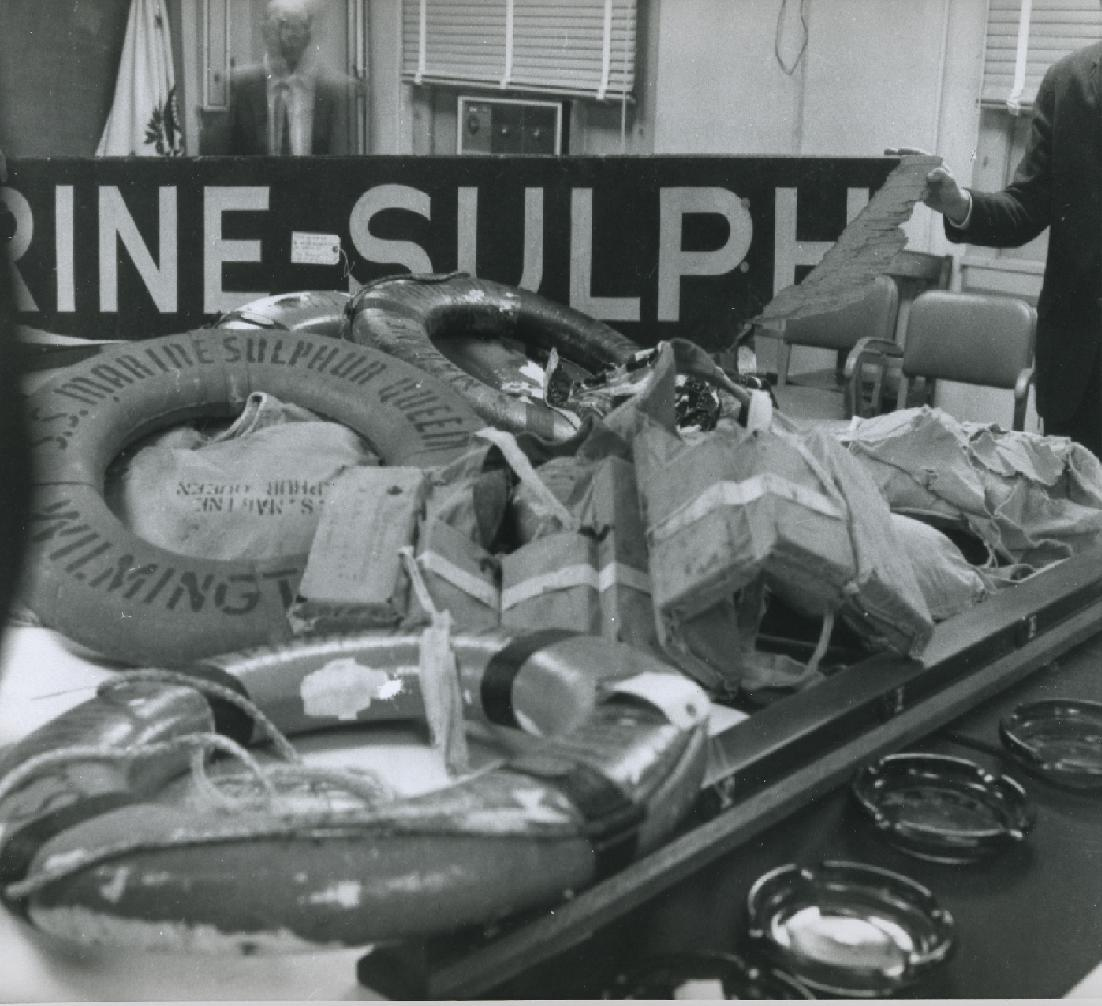
The remains of the SS Marine Sulphur Queen, recovered by the US Coast Guard

A Coast Guard investigation concluded several facts about the Marine Sulphur Queen which, by themselves, should have prevented the ship from going to sea at all. The most important were the incidents of fire beneath and along the sides of the four large sulphur tanks; according to former crewmen these fires were so common that ship's officers gave up sounding the fire alarm. On one occasion the ship sailed into a New Jersey harbor, off-loaded cargo, and sailed out with a fire still burning. When a fire was actually put out, the sulphur would puddle and cake around equipment, once shorting out a major electrical generator. Caked sulphur was also found in spaces below the tanks, due to many cracks in the structure.

The Coast Guard also noted that the T2 tanker class had a characteristic that it has a "weak back", meaning the keel would split at a point weakened by corrosion, usually around midships. Such a splitting had happened on several T2 tankers, and many were discovered during inspections to have hairline or larger fractures within the keel and on major frames. Companies who owned T2 tankers were ordered to pay attention to the keel when inspecting. Former crewmen also testified that corrosion was everywhere, mentioning inoperable temperature gauges, a ruptured steam coil, and worn packing around the screws. It was recorded that Marine Sulphur Queen was scheduled for a drydock inspection in January 1963, but it was postponed by the owners, who had complained that cargo deliveries were behind and they needed their ships to catch up. One new crewman, on reporting to the ship just before it sailed for the last time, turned to his wife and pronounced it "a floating garbage can."

In the closing of the inquiry the Coast Guard had this to say:

"1. In view of the vast search operations conducted and the debris found and identified as coming from the MARINE SULPHUR QUEEN, the ship and her entire crew of 39 men are presumed to be lost.

2. Concurring with the Board, the vessel apparently was lost on 4 February 1963 on its approach to, or in the vicinity of, the Straits of Florida.

3. Further concurring with the Board, in the absence of survivors or physical remains of the ship, the exact cause of the loss of the MARINE SULPHUR QUEEN cannot be determined.

4. The Board considered many possibilities which may have caused the loss of the ship and rightly declined to assign any order of probability to these causes. In its conclusions the Board commented on the following possible causes:

a. An explosion may have occurred in the cargo tanks.
b. A complete failure of the vessel's hull girder may have caused it to break in two
c. The vessel may have capsized in synchronous rolling
d. A steam explosion may have occurred as the result of a rapid filling of the void space with water.

The record contains ample evidence to support the Board's suppositions."

The Coast Guard also recommended that no remaining T2 tanker be converted into a sulphur carrier without taking into consideration the structure of the ship as originally built. "First, the acceptability of any conversion must be considered on its individual merits, having regard for the existing condition of the vessel and the proposed cargo, route, and service. Secondly, the objection to the conversion of an existing T2 or another tanker of comparable age is associated with the probable condition of the vessel, particularly the cargo portion, due to age, as much as it is due to design considerations."

== Litigation ==
The loss of the ship was subject of a lawsuit filed within weeks of the sinking by relatives of the crew members seeking $2.5 million in damages under two specific federal acts (the Jones Act, 46 U.S.C. § 688; and the Death on the High Seas Act, 46 U.S.C. § 761), based upon maritime laws regarding the unseaworthiness of a vessel. Marine Sulphur Transport Corporation (the owners of the ship), and Marine Transport Lines, Inc. (demise charterer) petitioned for exoneration or at least a limitation of liability. The amount of damages sought would grow to $20 million by 1969.

The United States Court of Appeals (2nd Circuit) concluded that:

- the ship was not structurally sound as a result of the sulphur tank conversion;
- the tank was centered too narrowly within the ship resulting in a high center of gravity, which meant that during a roll in heavy seas, it would take longer to recover.
- the ship was not properly inspected nor maintained by the owners;

In its 25 April 1972 ruling the court denied the exoneration of the owners and found them liable in regard to the unseaworthiness of the ship. It awarded damages to the crew relatives, but denied them punitive damages; the reason for it, as stated in the Coast Guard report, was that no one knew how the ship was lost, and in the absence of the remains of the vessel, they could go no further:

"The wrongful death claimants therefore sustained their burden of proving unseaworthiness and there remained only the issue of whether or not one or more of the conditions of unseaworthiness or some other agency caused the disaster. The court found in explicit terms that 'no one knows how the ship was lost.' The resolution of the question of liability will, under the circumstances, be determined by the allocation of the burden of proof on the causation issue, the existence of a rebuttable presumption and whether or not that presumption has been met."

== Precedent ==
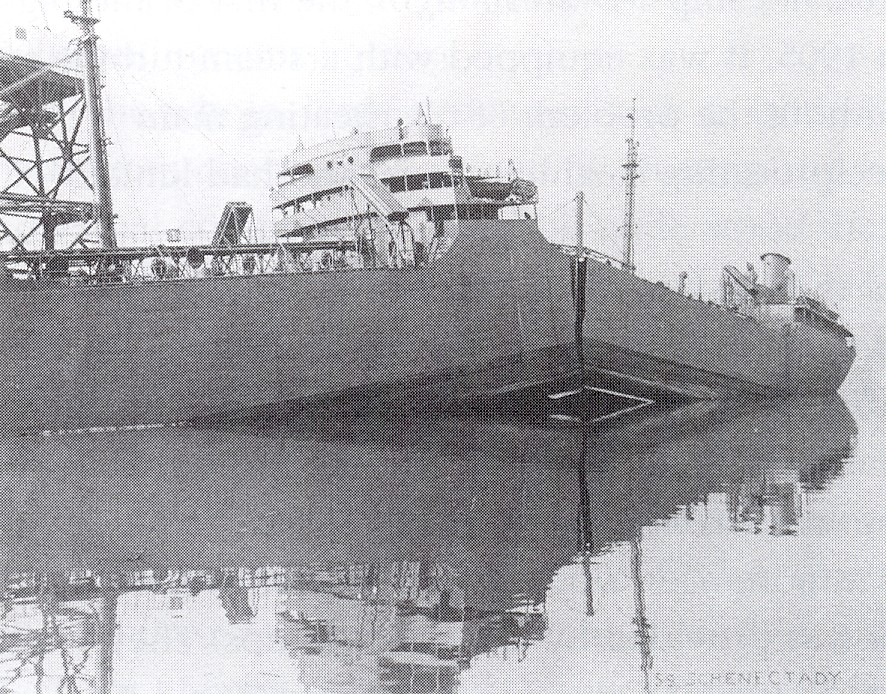
T2 tanker SS Schenectady, showing her bad keel.

Nearly 20 years prior to the loss of the Marine Sulphur Queen, the United States General Accounting Office published a report titled TO INQUIRE INTO THE DESIGN METHODS OF CONSTRUCTION OF WELDED STEEL MERCHANT VESSELS, 15 July 1946, which was essentially a report of concern over civilian merchant ships, specifically T2 tankers, fracturing amidships at the keel. Even during World War II, the federal government was concerned over the large number of merchant ship casualties not resulting from combat, and investigation centered on possible shoddy construction.

A sister ship, SS Sylvia L. Ossa, went down in heavy seas east of Bermuda on 15 October 1976; all that was recovered was debris and a lifeboat in which the quick-release mechanism was still intact.

== False connection to the Bermuda Triangle ==
Despite the ship being lost nowhere near the Bermuda Triangle, writers of the subject have placed it in every work due to its loss with no trace other than bits of debris, sometimes agreeing with the Coast Guard report, other times coming up with their own theories. Vincent Gaddis was the first writer to coin the name Bermuda Triangle in his article for Argosy magazine in the February 1964 issue, and Marine Sulphur Queen was the first Triangle "victim" he mentioned, barely a year after the ship sank:

With a crew of thirty-nine, the tanker Marine Sulphur Queen began its final voyage on 2 February 1963, from Beaumont, Texas, with a cargo of molten sulphur. Its destination was Norfolk, Virginia, but it actually sailed into the unknown..."

Gaddis himself gave no theory as to the sinking, and ignored the many physical and personnel discrepancies cited by the Coast Guard. What he did was to reduce the loss of the ship to sailing "into the unknown", as did many writers after him. The effect was to leave an aura of mystery, and as such, many theories, some very outlandish, have been postulated to explain the disappearance of the ship.

The Sci-Fi Channel posted a summary of its program The Bermuda Triangle: Startling New Secrets on its website, in which it said that all that was recovered was a lifeboat. The Coast Guard had listed all that was recovered and identified for its report, as well as assembling the items for public display during the inquiry, which was photographed. A lifeboat was not among the debris, nor was one recovered.

A 1977 episode of In Search Of discussed the Marine Sulphur Queen incident.

The wreckage site of the Marine Sulphur Queen lies before the Bermuda Triangle on its route.
