= SS Pratt Victory =

US WWII vessel

- A typical Victory ship

History

United States
- Name: SS Pratt Victory
- Namesake: Pratt Institute
- Owner: War Shipping Administration
- Operator: Waterman Steamship Company
- Builder: California Shipbuilding (Calship)
- Yard number: 272
- Laid down: 22 February 1945
- Launched: 14 April 1945
- Acquired: 9 May 1945
- In service: 1945
- Fate: Sold 1961, resold 1965 & 1968, scrapped 1972

General characteristics
- Class & type: VC2-S-AP2 Victory ship
- Tonnage: 10,750 long tons deadweight (DWT)
- Length: 455 ft (139 m)
- Beam: 62 ft (19 m)
- Draft: 28 ft 6 in (8.69 m)
- Propulsion: Allis-Chalmers cross-compound steam turbine with double reduction gears; 6,000 hp (4,500 kW) at 103 rpm
- Speed: 17.5 knots (32.4 km/h; 20.1 mph)
- Range: 23,500 mi (20,400 nmi; 37,800 km)
- Capacity: 500,000 cu ft (14,000 m^{3}) (approx.)
- Complement: 62 United States Merchant Marine and United States Navy Armed Guard
- Armament: 5-inch (127 mm) stern gun; 2 × 3-inch (76 mm) anti-aircraft gun; 8 × Oerlikon 20 mm cannon (as war Victory ship)

SS Pratt Victory was a United States Victory ship which served in the Pacific Theater of Operations during the last few months of World War II. The ship's US Maritime Commission (MARCOM) designation was VC2-S-AP3, hull number 782 (V-782). SS Pratt Victory was named after Pratt Institute in New York City. It was built in 76 days at the California Shipbuilding Yard (Calship) in Los Angeles, California, and was delivered on 9 May 1945.

SS Pratt Victory was the 782nd of the 10,500-ton class known as Victory ships, built under the Emergency Shipbuilding Program. Victory ships were designed to replace the earlier Liberty ships. Liberty ships were designed to be used solely for World War II. Victory ships were designed to last longer and serve the US Navy after the war. The Victory ship differed from a Liberty ship in that it was faster, longer, wider, taller, and had a thinner stack set farther toward the superstructure and a long raised forecastle.

== World War II ==
SS Pratt Victory delivered supplies in the island-hopping campaigns towards the Empire of Japan. She served as a US Merchant Marine ship operated by the Waterman SS Company. As a Merchant Marine ship, she had a civilian crew to man the ship and US Navy Armed Guards to man the deck guns.

The Pratt Victory was torpedoed on her starboard side into the number 2 cargo hold on 27 July 1945. Pratt Victory was south of Ie Shima island near Okinawa Island when the aerial torpedo hit her. The torpedo sank the tank landing craft LCT-1050 that was being supplied by the Pratt Victory at that time. LCT-1050 was later raised and salvaged. The torpedo did not kill any of the Pratt Victory crew, and the ship was able to complete delivery of cargo from the intact holds. At the time of the surrender of Japan on 15 August 1945, the damage to the Pratt Victory was not completely repaired. One of her cargo holds remained flooded; a metal patch was placed on the torpedo hole, but only above the water line. In this condition Pratt Victory could not make her normal top speed of 17.5 knots (32.4 km/h; 20.1 mph) but was still as fast as a Liberty ship at 11 knots (20 km/h; 13 mph). She was transferred from the United States Merchant Marine to the US Navy for special assignment.

After the surrender of Japan the SS Pratt Victory served on what was called the "Guinea Pig Squadron". The "Guinea Pig Ships", sometimes called "ghost ships" due to their reduced crews, steamed the sea where mines had been laid to make certain that the explosives were no longer a menace to shipping. Of particular concern were pressure mines which, unlike magnetically- or acoustically-activated mines, were designed to detonate by a large change in the water pressure, such as that from the passage of an 8,000- to 10,000-ton ship. They were thus difficult to sweep. The US Navy laid many pressure mines in bays and sea ways of Japan, dropping many from Boeing B-29 Superfortress bombers. These mines had been designed to stop functioning over time, on schedule for a planned US invasion of Japan called Operation Downfall.

The SS Pratt Victory swept for mines with two other damaged ships: the Liberty ship SS Joseph Holt which had taken damage from a grounding at Buckner Bay, Okinawa, in a typhoon and former troopship SS Marathon which had taken torpedo damage at Buckner Bay. The three ships steamed about 150 yards (140 m) apart in the sea ways near Japan. Pratt Victory was modified with remote controls for the engines and boilers so that no one had to be below deck, had empty cargo holds so she would float high in the water, and the decks and operation rooms of the ship were lined with mattresses. The crew was small, about 22 men, all volunteers for the dangerous assignment. All three ships completed their sweeps without detonating a mine; the US Navy minesweepers had cleared the sea way completely and many mines had stopped working as planned.

The volunteer crew were awarded several medals: The Navy and Marine Corps Medal and the Bronze Star. Semon Leroy Teague, who served on the Pratt Victory, received the Bronze Star, with a citation that states:

Volunteering for the hazardous assignment of steaming through suspected pressure mined waters, Lieutenant, Junior Grade, Teague courageously made check sweep runs over entrance channels and anchorages known to have been mined by our forces and contributed materially to the safe entry of United States occupational forces to the Empire of Japan.

== Post-war ==
Pratt Victory was laid up in the James River in 1945, as part of the National Defense Reserve Fleet. She was repaired and put back in service as a new war started in the Far East.

== Korean War ==
SS Pratt Victory served as merchant marine naval supplying goods for the Korean War. She helped to move the 140th Medium Tank Battalion. About 75 percent of the personnel and 90 percent of the cargo taken to the Korean War zone were delivered by merchant marine ships. SS Pratt Victory transported goods, mail, food and other supplies. SS Pratt Victory made trips between 18 November 1950 and 23 December 1952.

== Private use ==
In 1961 she was sold to the West Coast Steamship Company in Portland, Oregon, and renamed Portland Victory. In 1965 she was sold to Saxis Steamship Company of Wilmington, Delaware, and renamed Columbia Victory. In 1968 she was sold to Columbia SS Company and renamed Columbia Trader. On 24 November 1971 she was damaged by an underwater explosion at Chalna Port (now called Port of Mongla) in Bangladesh. She was scrapped at Kaohsiung, Taiwan in 1972.

== Ship awards ==
- Victory Medal
- Pacific War Zone Bar
- Secretary of the Navy awarded Navy Occupation Service Medal and China Service Medal to the Armed Guard Crew for service from 13 October 1945 to 12 March 1946.

== See also ==
- Liberty ship the previous line of cargo ships.
- List of Victory ships
- Type C1 ship
- Type C2 ship
- Type C3 ship

== Sources ==
- Sawyer, L.A. and W.H. Mitchell. Victory Ships and Tankers: The History of the 'Victory' Type Cargo Ships and of the Tankers Built in the United States of America During World War II, Cornell Maritime Press, 1974, 0-87033-182-5.
- United States Maritime Commission:
- Victory Cargo Ships
