= SS Panama Victory =

Victory ship of the United States

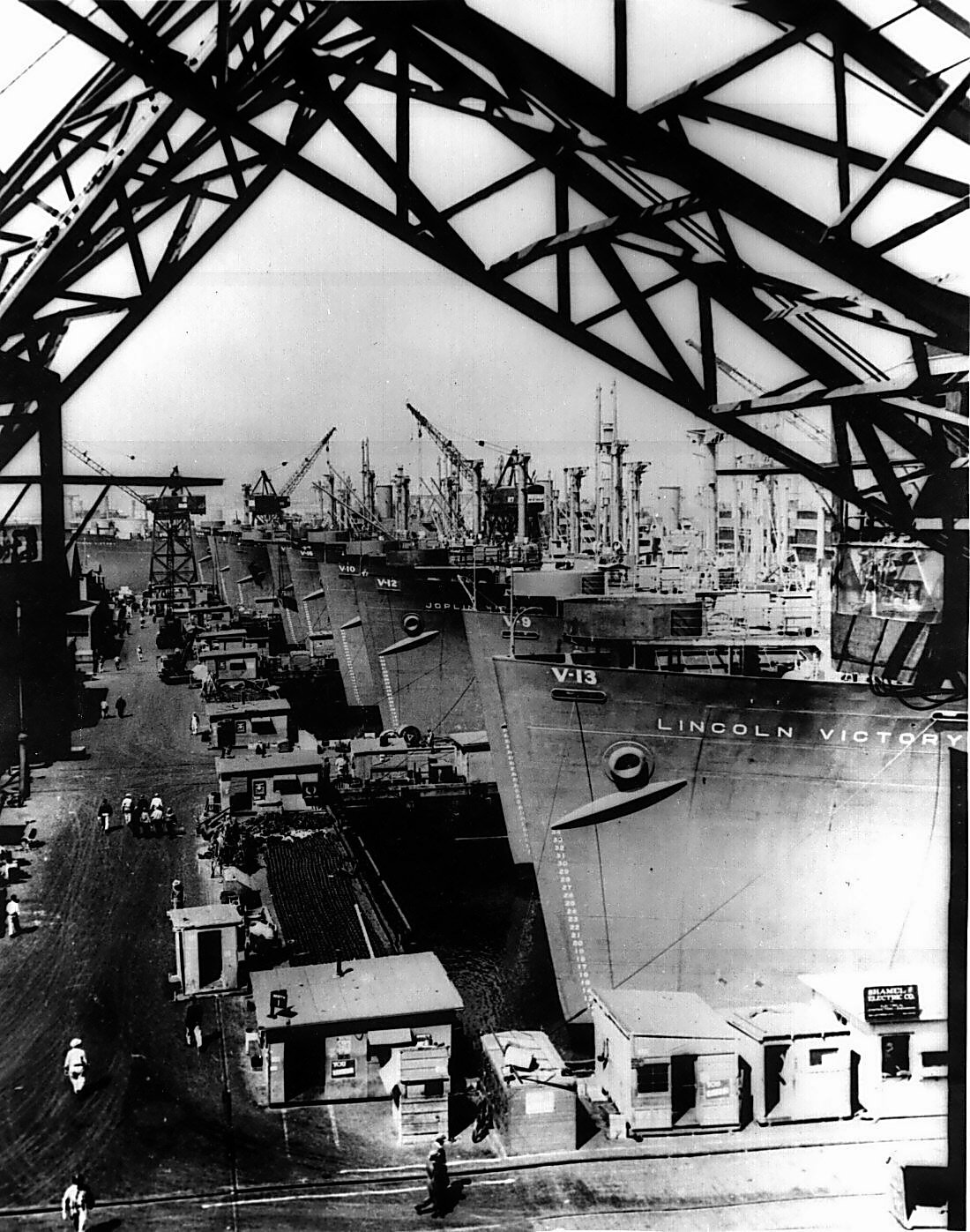
- The second ship, with V-9 on the hull, is the SS Panama Victory.

History

United States
- Name: SS Panama Victory
- Namesake: Panama
- Owner: War Shipping Administration
- Operator: Marine Transport Line
- Builder: California Shipbuilding Company, Los Angeles
- Laid down: February 5, 1944
- Launched: April 3, 1944
- Completed: May 30, 1944
- Fate: Sold, 1946

Netherlands
- Name: SS Amsteldijk
- Owner: Holland America Line
- Operator: Holland America Line
- Renamed: SS Amsteldyk, 1954
- Fate: Sold, 1968

Panama
- Name: SS Helena
- Owner: Progressive Mariner S.A. of Panama
- Operator: Progressive Mariner S.A.
- Fate: Scrapped in Taiwan, 1973

General characteristics
- Class & type: VC2-S-AP3 Victory ship
- Tonnage: 7612 GRT, 4,553 NRT
- Displacement: 15,200 tons
- Length: 455 ft (139 m)
- Beam: 62 ft (19 m)
- Draught: 28 ft (8.5 m)
- Installed power: 8,500 shp (6,300 kW)
- Propulsion: HP & LP turbines geared to a single 20.5-foot (6.2 m) propeller
- Speed: 16.5 knots
- Boats & landing craft carried: 4 Lifeboats
- Complement: 62 Merchant Marine and 28 US Naval Armed Guards
- Armament: 1 × 5 inch (127 mm)/38 caliber gun; 1 × 3 inch (76 mm)/50 caliber gun; 8 × 20 mm Oerlikon

The SS Panama Victory was a Victory ship built during World War II. She was launched by the California Shipbuilding Company on April 3, 1944, and completed on May 30, 1944. She was built in 115 days under the Emergency Shipbuilding program. The ship's United States Maritime Commission designation was VC2-S-AP3, hull number 9 (V-9). SS Panama Victory served in the Pacific Ocean during World War II. SS Panama Victory was ninth of the new 10,500-ton class ship to be known as Victory ships. Victory ships were designed to replace the earlier Liberty Ships. Liberty ships were designed to be used just for WW2. Victory ships were designed to last longer and serve the US Navy after the war. The Victory ship differed from a Liberty ship in that they were: faster, longer and wider, taller, had a thinner stack set farther toward the superstructure and had a long raised forecastle. Engine was made by Joshua Hendy Iron Works Inc. of Sunnyvale, California.

SS Panama Victory was christened on April 3, 1944, by Mrs. Jimenez wife of ambassador Don Enrique A. Jimenez of Panama. The SS Panama Victory was one of a long line of Victory ships to leave the Calship building. The launching of The SS Panama Victory splashed into the water of Terminal Island to enter the Pacific War.

== World War II ==
SS Panama Victory was operated by Marine Transport Line under charter with the Maritime Commission and War Shipping Administration. SS Panama Victory took to part in the Guadalcanal Campaign. The SS Panama Victory was in combat action in Lingayen Gulf in Philippines and survived an attack on January 12, 1945. She supplied a number of Landing Ship, Tank in WW2. On Feb. 28, 1945 she unloaded cargo on to other ships at the Ulithi atoll.

== Post World War II ==
She was sold on 1946 to Holland America Line in Rotterdam and renamed SS Amsteldijk. In 1954 Holland America Line renamed her the SS Amsteldyk. In 1968 she was sold to a Panama company, Progressive Mariner S.A. and renamed SS Helena. In 1968 she was sold to Sincere Navigation Corp., in Keelung in Taiwan. In 1973 she was scrapped in Taiwan.

== Honors ==
Crew of Naval Armed Guards on the SS Panama Victory' earned "Battle Stars" in World War II for war action during the Invasion of Lingayen Gulf from 4 Jan. 1945 to 18 Jan. 1945.

Typical Victory Ship

== See also ==
- List of Victory ships
- Type C1 ship
- Type C2 ship
- Type C3 ship

== Sources ==
- Sawyer, L.A. and W.H. Mitchell. Victory ships and tankers: The history of the ‘Victory’ type cargo ships and of the tankers built in the United States of America during World War II, Cornell Maritime Press, 1974, 0-87033-182-5.
- United States Maritime Commission:
- Victory Cargo Ships
