= Marine Transport Line =

Shipping Company

- Founded: 1942
- Successor: Marine Transport Corporation and Crowley Maritime
- Headquarters: New York, New York, North Charleston, South Carolina
- Area served: Cargo Worldwide
- Parent: C.D. Mallory & Company

The Marine Transport Line (MTL) of New York, New York was a commercial steamship service started to support the needs of charter shipping for the Maritime Commission and War Shipping Administration during World War II by CD Mallory & Co. During wartime the Marine Transport Line operated Victory ships, and also a few other ships.

After the war it moved to operating mostly tanker ships. MTL was acquired by the General American Transportation Company in 1970, which spun it off in 1983. In 1998, it became part of the Marine Transport Corporation, which was acquired by Crowley Maritime in 2001.

MTL experienced major incidents with its converted tanker fleet, including the 1963 disappearance of the SS Marine Sulphur Queen and the 1983 sinking of the SS Marine Electric, both converted World War 2 tanker ships.

== World War II ==
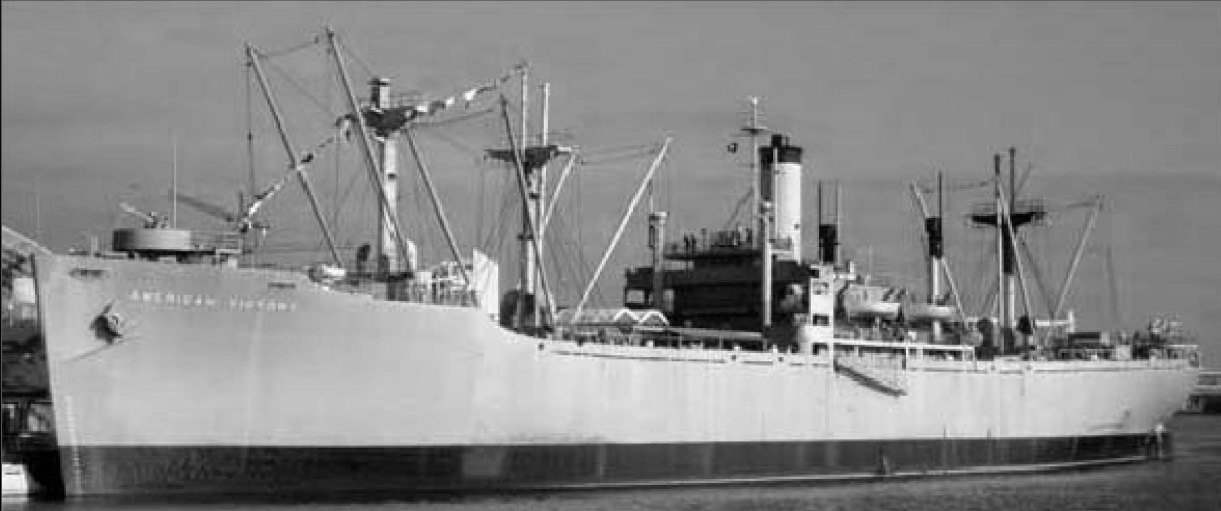
World War II Victory ship

Operated during World War II:

- SS E. Kirby Smith
- SS Harvey Cushing
- SS Adelphi Victory
- SS Alcedo (freighter sank, torpedoed February 28, 1945)
- SS Battle Creek Victory
- SS Black River (tanker)
- SS Chapel Hill Victory
- MV Halma (sank hit mine 1942)
- SS Howell E. Jackson
- SS Malay
- SS Malchace
- SS Medina Victory
- SS Panama Victory
- MV Sheherazade (attacked and sank 1942)
- SS Trinidad Victory
- SS Trinity Victory
- SS Wheaton Victory
- SS Winthrop Victory

== Korean War ==
- 16 tankers
- USNS Paoli (T-AO-157)

== Post War ==
- Kentucky
- Marine Union
- SS Marine Merchant, a converted Liberty ship (split in half on the night of April 13–14, 1961)
- SS Marine Sulphur Queen, ex Esso New Haven, a converted T2 tanker (disappeared with all hands on or about 4 February 1963)
- SS Marine Floridian, ex USNS Paoli (above), a converted T2 tanker; collided with the Benjamin Harrison Bridge on 24 February 1977 (scrapped in 1997)
- SS Marine Electric, ex Musgrove Mills, Gulfmills, a converted T2 tanker purchased by MTL in 1961 (Foundered on 12 February 1983)
- Nagano, Bulk carrier 1963
- Oswego Courage (1973)
