= SS Wheaton Victory =

Victory ship of the United States

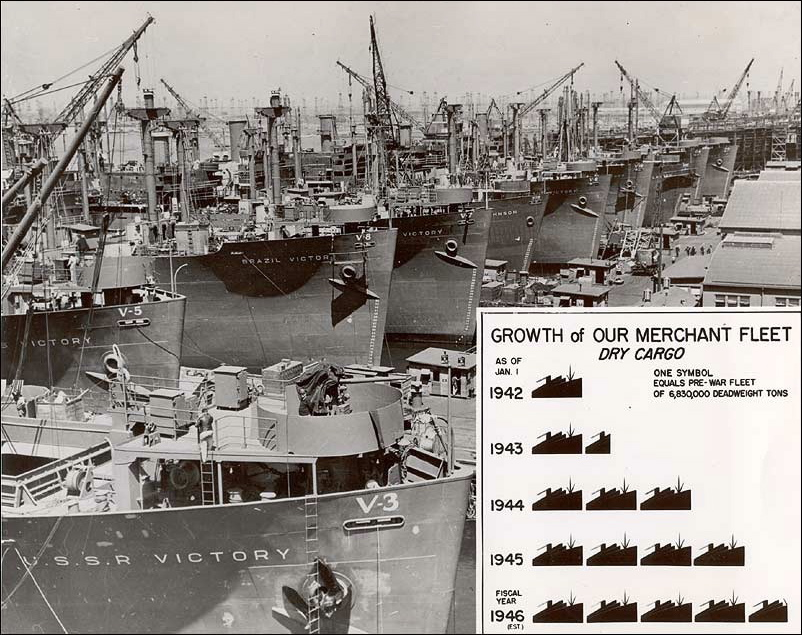
- California Shipbuilding Company

History

United States
- Name: Wheaton Victory
- Namesake: Wheaton College
- Owner: War Shipping Administration
- Operator: Marine Transport Line
- Builder: California Shipbuilding Company, Los Angeles
- Laid down: 27 January 1945
- Launched: 22 March 1945
- Completed: 14 April 1945
- Fate: Wrecked on 26 October 1963

General characteristics
- Class & type: VC2-S-AP3 Victory ship
- Tonnage: 7612 GRT, 4,553 NRT
- Displacement: 15,200 tons
- Length: 455 ft (139 m)
- Beam: 62 ft (19 m)
- Draught: 28 ft (8.5 m)
- Installed power: 8,500 shp (6,300 kW)
- Propulsion: HP & LP turbines geared to a single 20.5-foot (6.2 m) propeller, by Westinghouse Electric & Mfg. Co., Essington
- Speed: 16.5 knots
- Boats & landing craft carried: 4 Lifeboats
- Complement: 62 Merchant Marine and 28 US Naval Armed Guards
- Armament: During World War 2; 1 × 5 inch (127 mm)/38 caliber gun as Victory ship; 1 × 3 inch (76 mm)/50 caliber gun; 8 × 20 mm Oerlikon

The SS Wheaton Victory was a class of Victory ship built during World War II under the Emergency Shipbuilding program. She was launched by the California Shipbuilding Company on 22 March 1945. The ship was completed and delivered to the wartime operator of all United States oceangoing shipping, the War Shipping Administration (WSA), on 14 April 1945. Wheaton Victory was assigned to Marine Transport Line, under a standard WSA operating agreement at that time. That agreement continued until the ship's sale in 1947. The ship's United States Maritime Commission designation was VC2-S-AP3, hull number 776. Wheaton Victory was converted from a cargo ship to a troopship to bring troops home after the war as part of Operation Magic Carpet.

Wheaton Victory was one of the new 10,500-ton class ship to be known as Victory ships. Victory ships were designed to replace the earlier Liberty Ships. Liberty ships were designed to be used just for World War II. Victory ships were designed to last longer and serve the US Navy after the war. The Victory ship differed from a Liberty ship in that they were: faster, longer and wider, taller, had a thinner stack set farther toward the superstructure and had a long raised forecastle. The ship's namesake is for Wheaton College in Wheaton, Illinois. The SS Wheaton Victory was a Victory ship laid down on 27 January 1945 and one of a series of ships named for American colleges and universities.

Typical Victory Ship

== World War II ==
Wheaton Victory served as a troopship take troops to and from Europe. Wheaton Victory and 96 other Victory ships were converted to troopships take troops to Europe. Later she was used to bring the US soldiers home as part of Operation Magic Carpet from port cities known as Cigarette Camps. She was able to transport up to 1,500 troops to and from Europe. Her cargo holds were converted to bunk beds and hammocks stack three high for hot bunking. In the cargo hold Mess halls and exercise places were also added.

Trips: On July 22, 1945 Wheaton Victory arrived at New York City. On November 25, 1945 Wheaton Victory arrived at Newport News, Virginia with 1,915 troops with the 75th Infantry Division; 2nd battalion, 289th infantry; 3rd battalion, and 289th infantry. On December 27, 1945, the Wheaton Victory arrived at Boston from Antwerp, Belgium with 1,544 troops including the 539th Field Artillery Observation Battalion with medics, 8th field artillery observation battalion with medics, and the 759th tank battalion with medics. On January 26, 1946, the Wheaton Victory arrived at New York from Le Havre, France with 1,518 troops including 602nd antiaircraft artillery battalion and the 196th general hospital. On March 8, 1946, the Wheaton Victory arrived at New York from Antwerp with 1,501 troops, including 559th anti-aircraft artillery Automatic Weapons Battalion and the 825th Medical Detachment. On April 10, 1946, the Wheaton Victory arrived at New York from Antwerp with 931 troops, including 465th and 958th Quarter Masters companies. On May 16, 1946, the Wheaton Victory arrived at New York from Le Havre with 710 troops. On June 25, 1946, the Wheaton Victory arrived at New York from Bremen. On August 3, 1946, the Wheaton Victory arrived at New York from Bremerhaven with 1,372 army troops. On August 15, 1946, the Wheaton Victory departed New York bound for the Panama Canal.

== Post war ==
In 1947 the Wheaton Victory was sold to the Van Nievelt, Goudriaan & Company of Rotterdam and renamed the SS Alpherat. In 1963 she was sold to China Merchants S.N. Company of Keelung and renamed the SS Hai Fu. On 26 October 1963 she ran aground at the entrance to Honolulu Harbour. She was refloated, the damage made her not worth repairing. In 1964 she was towed to Taiwan and scrapped.

== See also ==
- List of Victory ships
- Liberty ship
- Type C1 ship
- Type C2 ship
- Type C3 ship

== Sources ==
- Sawyer, L.A. and W.H. Mitchell. Victory ships and tankers: The history of the ‘Victory’ type cargo ships and of the tankers built in the United States of America during World War II, Cornell Maritime Press, 1974, 0-87033-182-5.
- United States Maritime Commission: Victory Ships alphabetical list War II
- Victory Cargo Ships Oregon Shipyards Record Breakers Page 2
