= List of Victory ships (L) =

This is a list of Victory ships with names beginning with L.

== Description ==
A Victory ship was a cargo ship. The cargo ships were 455 feet 3 inches (138.76 m) overall, 436 feet 6 inches (133.05 m) between perpendiculars They had a beam of 62 feet 0 inches (18.90 m), a depth of 38 feet 0 inches (11.58 m) and a draught of 28 feet 0 inches (8.53 m). They were assessed at 7,612 GRT, 4,555 NRT and 10,750 DWT.

The ships were powered by a triple expansion steam engine, driving a steam turbine via double reduction gear. This gave the ship a speed of 15.5 knots (28.7 km/h) or 16.5 knots (30.6 km/h), depending on the machinery installed.

Liberty ships had five holds. No. 1 hold was 57 feet 6 inches (17.53 m) long, with a capacity of 81,715 cubic feet (2,313.9 m^{3}), No. 2 hold was 45 feet 0 inches (13.72 m) long, with a capacity of 89,370 cubic feet (2,531 m^{3}), No. 3 hold was 78 feet 0 inches (23.77 m) long, with a capacity of 158,000 cubic feet (4,500 m^{3}), No. 4 hold was 81 feet 0 inches (24.69 m) long, with a capacity of 89,370 cubic feet (2,531 m^{3}) and No. 5 hold was 75 feet 0 inches (22.86 m) long, with a capacity of 81,575 cubic feet (2,309.9 m^{3}).

In wartime service, they carried a crew of 62, plus 28 gunners. The ships carried four lifeboats. Two were powered, with a capacity of 27 people and two were unpowered, with a capacity of 29 people.

== Laconia Victory ==
Laconia Victory was a troop transport built by Bethlehem Fairfield Shipyard, Baltimore, Maryland. Her keel was laid on 30 January 1945. She was launched on 19 March and delivered on 13 April. Built for the War Shipping Administration (WSA), she was operated under the management of Parry Navigation Company. Laid up in the James River in 1946. Sold in 1948 to Pocohontas Steamship Co., Wilmington, Delaware and renamed Oakley L. Alexander. Rebuilt as a bulk coal carrier by Newport News Shipbuilding & Drydock Co., Newport News, Virginia. Sold in 1965 to Marine Navigation Co., Wilmington, Delaware and renamed Marine Collier. Exchanged for T2 tanker Lynchberg in 1968 under the Ship Exchange Act. Sold to Danish buyers in August 1969, resold to German then Spanish buyers for scrapping. She broke her moorings at Mobile, Alabama during Hurricane Camille and was damaged. She departed under tow on 21 September 1968 for scrapping at Santander, Spain.

== La Crosse Victory ==
La Crosse Victory was a troop transport built by Bethlehem Fairfield Shipyard. Her keel was laid on 4 November 1944. She was launched on 22 December and delivered on 29 January 1945. Built for the WSA, she was operated under the management of American Export Line. Laid up in the James River in 1946. Sold in 1947 to Compania Argentina de Navigation Dodero, Buenos Aires, Argentina and renamed Tucuman. Sold in 1949 to Flota Argentina de Navigation de Ultramar, Buenos Aires. Sold in 1961 to Empresa Lineas Maritimas Argentinas, Buenos Aires. She ran aground at Bahía Blanca, Argentina on 22 October 1961 whilst on a voyage from Bahía Blanca to Liverpool, United Kingdom. She was refloated on 31 October and towed in to Bahía Blanca. Although declared a constructive total loss, eighteen months were spent making temporary repairs. She then sailed to Buenos Aires for permanent repairs. Sold in 1963 to Armadora Tucuman SA., Panama. Sold in 1965 to Magellan Strait Development Corp., Liberia and renamed Kismet. Renamed Bucephalos in 1966. She sustained severe machinery damage in March 1968 whilst on a voyage from Callao, Peru to Buenos Aires and put in to Valparaíso, Chile. Repairs were deemed uneconomic. She arrived under tow at Kaohsiung, Taiwan on 3 September 1968 and was scrapped there in January 1969.

== Lafayette Victory ==
Lafayette Victory was built by Permanente Metals Corporation, Richmond, California. Her keel was laid on 25 March 1945. She was launched on 5 May and delivered on 30 May. Built for the WSA, she was operated under the management of Sudden & Christenson. Laid up in the Hudson River in 1947. Later transferred to the James River. She was scrapped at Kaohsiung in 1988.

== La Grande Victory ==
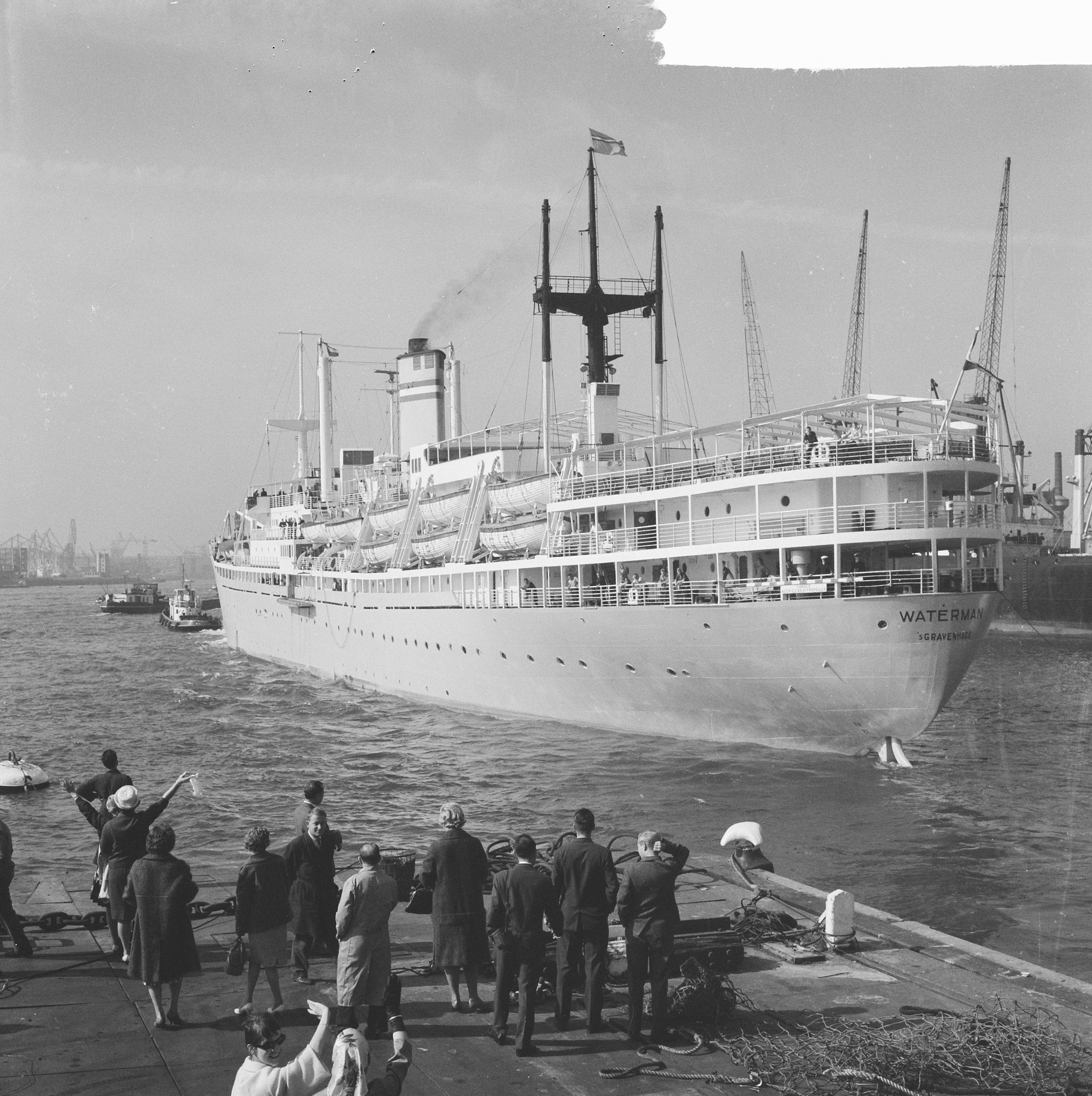
Waterman

La Grande Victory was built by Oregon Shipbuilding Corporation, Portland, Oregon. Her keel was laid on 6 December 1944. She was launched on 16 January 1945 and delivered on 28 February. Built for the WSA, she was operated under the management of Shephard Steamship Co. To the Dutch Government in 1947 and renamed Waterman. Operated under the management of Koninklijke Rotterdamsche Lloyd. Converted to a 900-passenger emigrant ship in 1951. Now 9,176 GRT. Sold in 1961 to NV Scheepvaart Maatschappij Trans-Ocean, Den Haag, Netherlands. A rebuild at Vlissingen increased her to 9,374 GRT. Sold in December 1963 to John S. Latsis, Piraeus, Greece. She was scrapped at Onomichi, Japan in March 1970.

== Lagrange ==
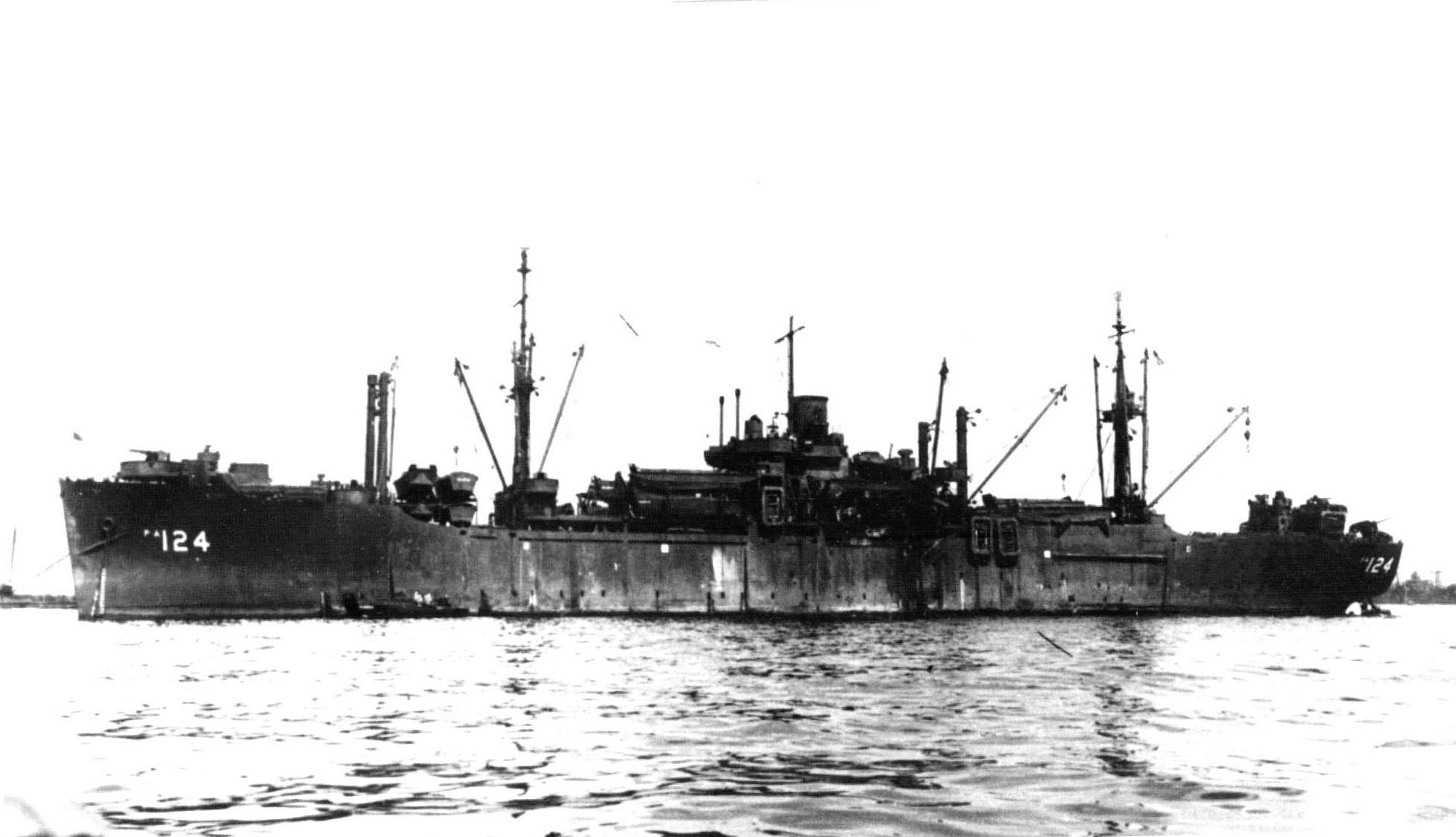
USS La Grange

La Grange was built by California Shipbuilding Corporation, Terminal Island, Los Angeles, California. Her keel was laid on 10 June 1944. She was launched on 27 July and delivered on 3 September. Built for the United States Navy. To the United States Maritime Commission (USMC) in 1946 and laid up in Suisun Bay. She was scrapped in the United States in 1973.

== Lahaina Victory ==
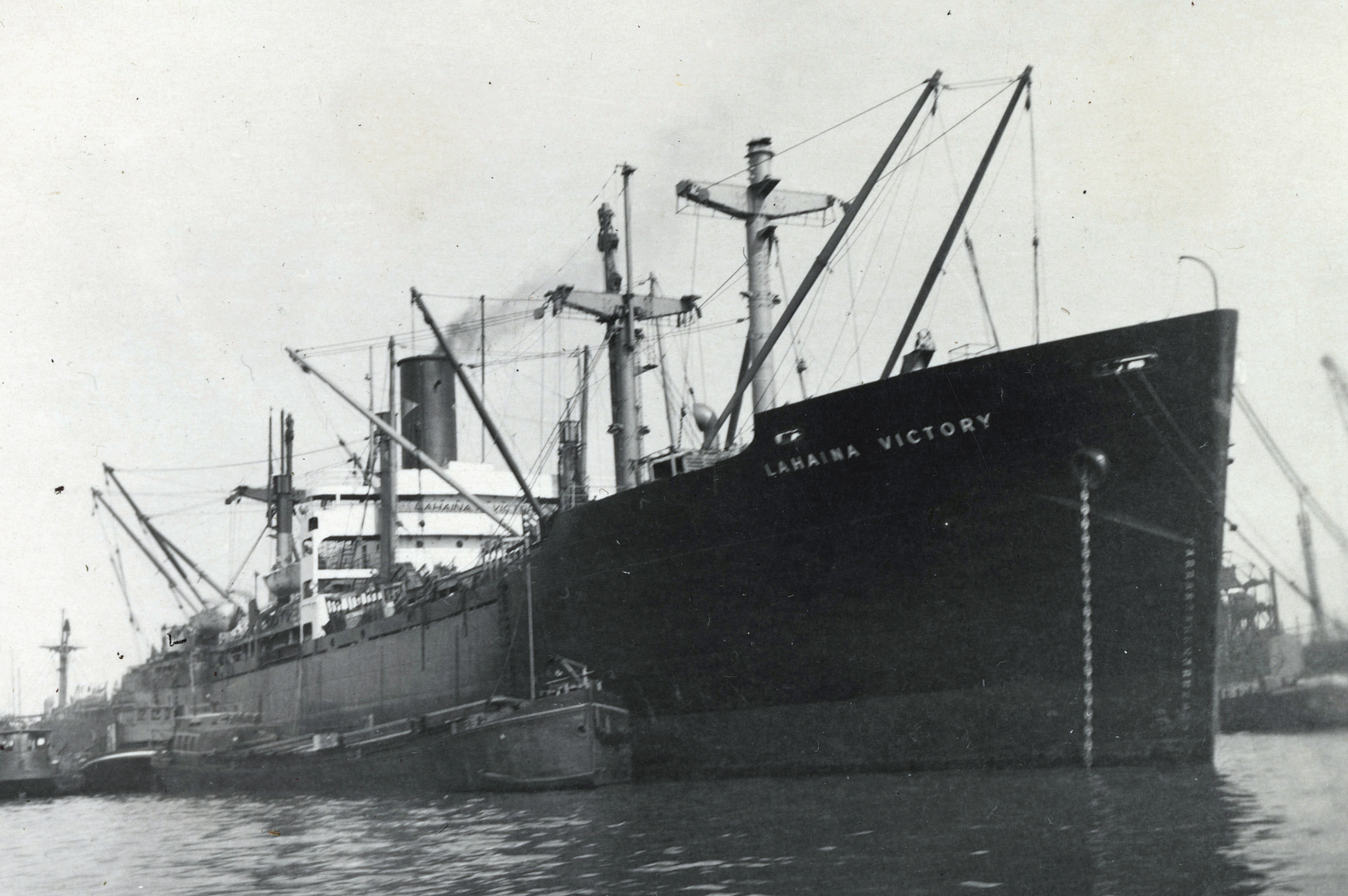
Lahaina Victory

Lahaina Victory was built by Permanente Metals Corporation. Her keel was laid on 20 November 1944. She was launched on 18 January 1945 and delivered on 10 February. Built for the WSA, she was operated under the management of Matson Navigation Company. Laid up at Wilmington, North Carolina in 1948. Returned to service in 1966 due to the Vietnam War. Operated under the management of Alaska Steamship Company. Laid up in Suisun Bay in 1973. She was scrapped in China in 1994.

== Lake Charles Victory ==
Lake Charles Victory was built by Bethlehem Fairfield Shipyard. Her keel was laid on 5 December 1944. She was launched on 1 February 1945 and delivered on 28 February. Built for the WSA, she was operated under the management of Lykes Brothers Steamship Company. Laid up in the James River in 1946. Sold in 1947 to Compania Argentina de Navigation Ultramar and renamed Argentina Victory. Sold in 1948 to Holland-Amerika Linie, Rotterdam, Netherlands and renamed Akkrumdijk. Renamed Akkrumdyk in 1954. Sold in 1962 to Overseas Maritime Inc., Monrovia, Liberia and renamed Pacific Comet. She sustained machinery damage in the Pacific Ocean (33°31′N 150°26′W) on 20 November 1968 and was towed in to Honolulu, Hawaii, United States. Temporary repairs were made to complete her voyage to Saigon, Vietnam. Permanent repairs were deemed uneconomic. She was scrapped at Kaohsiung in August 1969.

== Lakeland Victory ==
Lakeland Victory was built by Permanente Metals Corporation. Her keel was laid on 8 June 1945. She was launched on 18 July and delivered on 25 August. Built for the WSA, she was operated under the management of American South African Line. Laid up at Astoria, Oregon in 1950. She was scrapped at Portland, Oregon in July 1968.

== Lakewood Victory ==
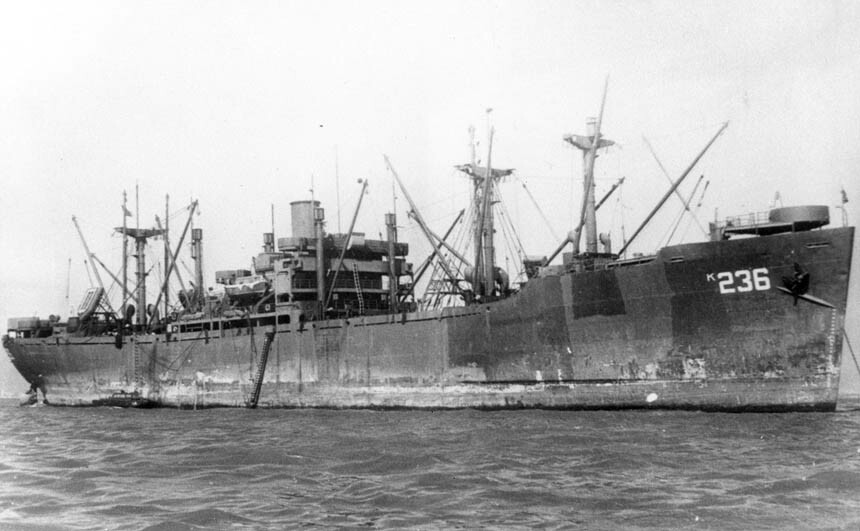
USS Lakewood Victory

Lakewood Victory was built by Permanente Metals Corporation. Her keel was laid on 16 September 1944. She was launched on 17 November and delivered on 11 December. Built for the United States Navy. To the USMC in 1946. Laid up in Suisun Bay in 1949. She was scrapped in China in 1993.

== Lander ==
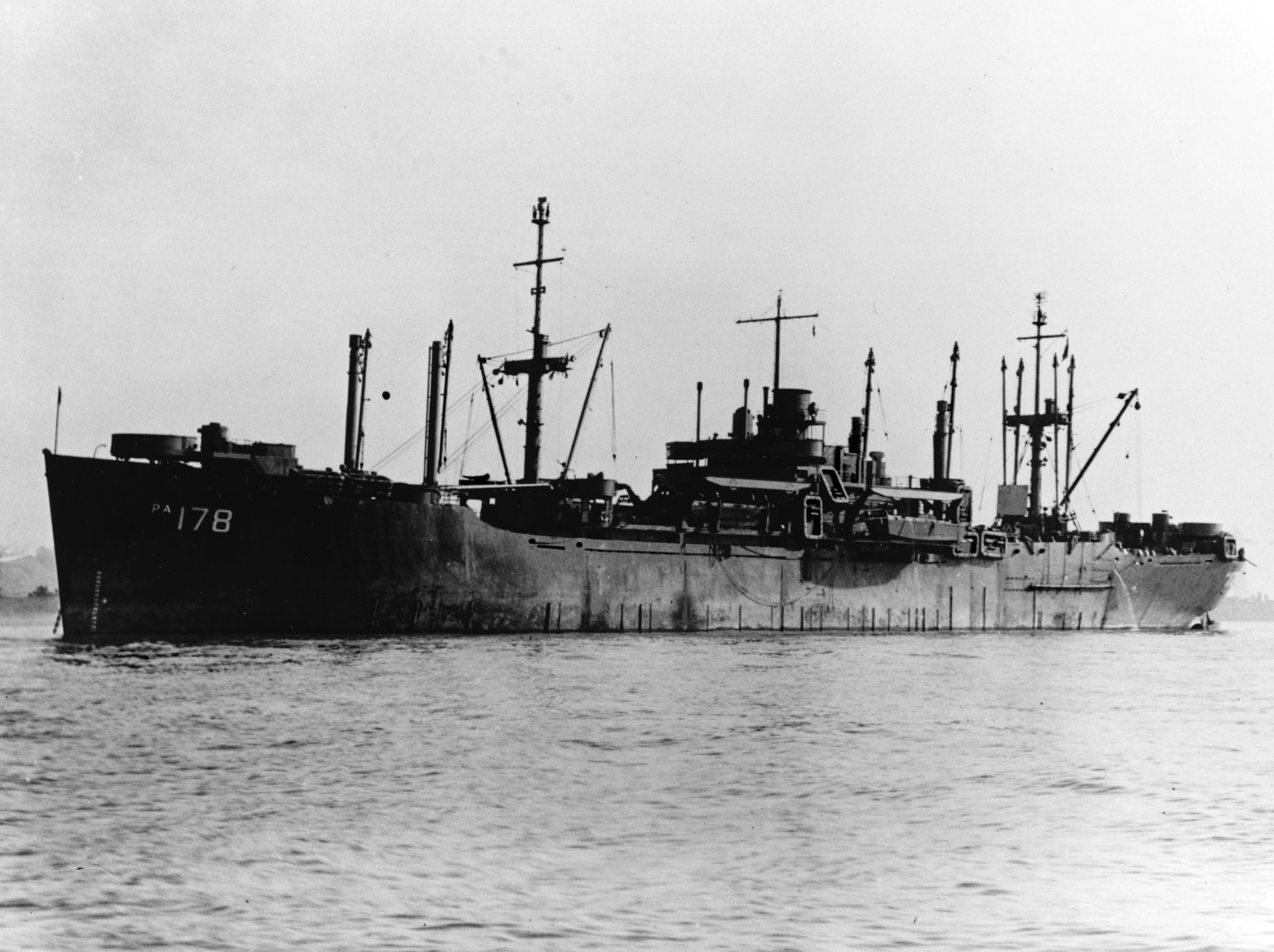
USS Lander

Lander was built by Oregon Shipbuilding Corporation. Her keel was laid on 9 October 1944. She was launched on 19 November and delivered on 9 December. Built for the United States Navy. To the USMC in 1946. Laid up in the James River. She was scrapped in 1983.

== Lane Victory ==
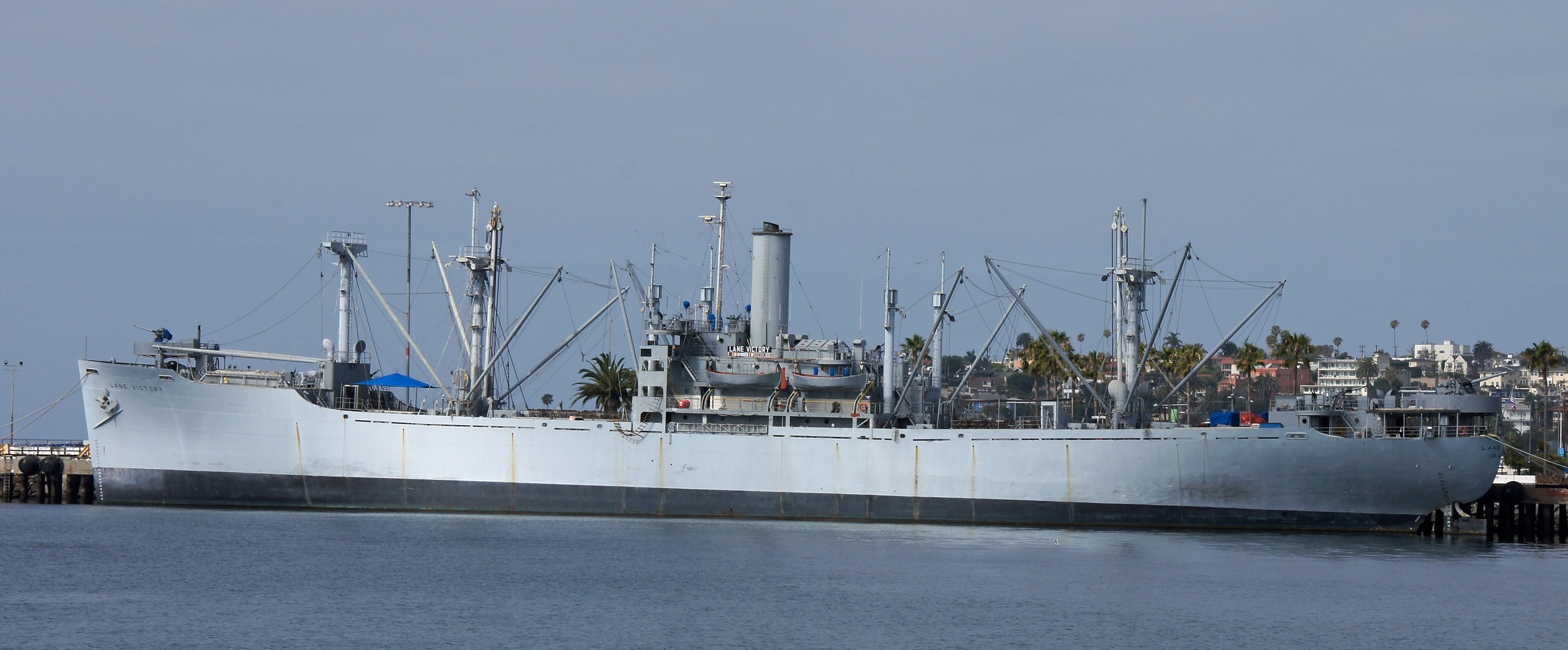
Lane Victory

Lane Victory was built by California Shipbuilding Corporation. Her keel was laid on 5 April 1945. She was launched on 31 May and delivered on 27 June. Built for the WSA, she was operated under the management of American President Lines. Chartered to her managers in 1946. Laid up in Suisun Bay in 1948. Returned to service in 1950 due to the Korean War. Laid up in Suisun Bay in 1953. Returned to service in 1966 due to the Vietnam War. Laid up in Suisun Bay in 1970. Presented to U.S. Merchant Marines WWII Veterans in 1988. Restored and preserved as a museum ship.

== Lanier ==
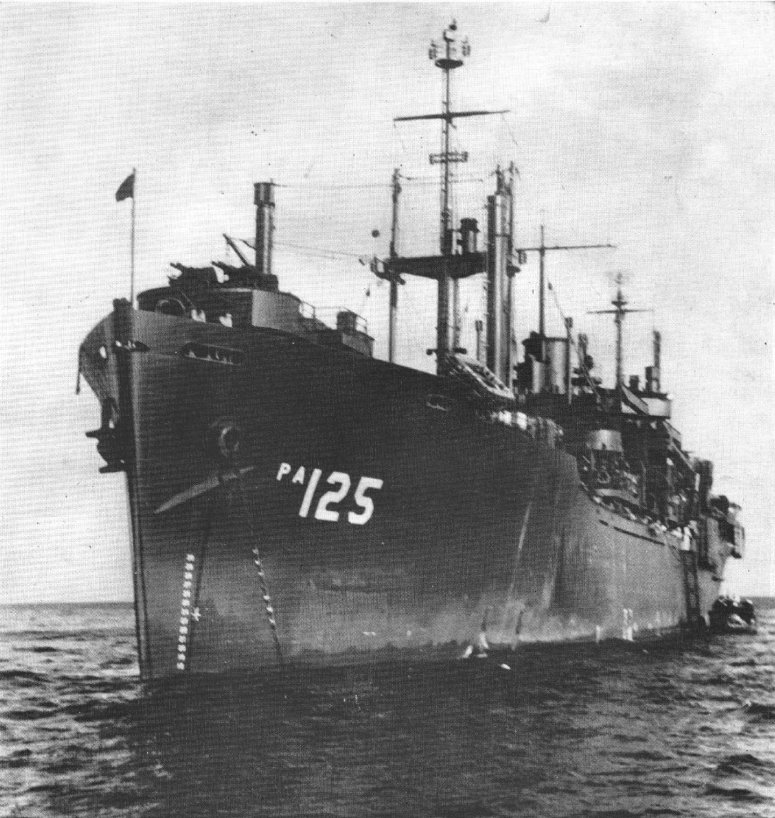
USS Lanier

Lanier was built by California Shipbuilding Corporation. Her keel was laid on 29 June 1944. She was launched on 4 September and delivered on 14 November. Built for the United States Navy. To the USMC in 1946 and laid up in the James River. She was sold to New York shipbreakers in April 1973.

== La Porte ==
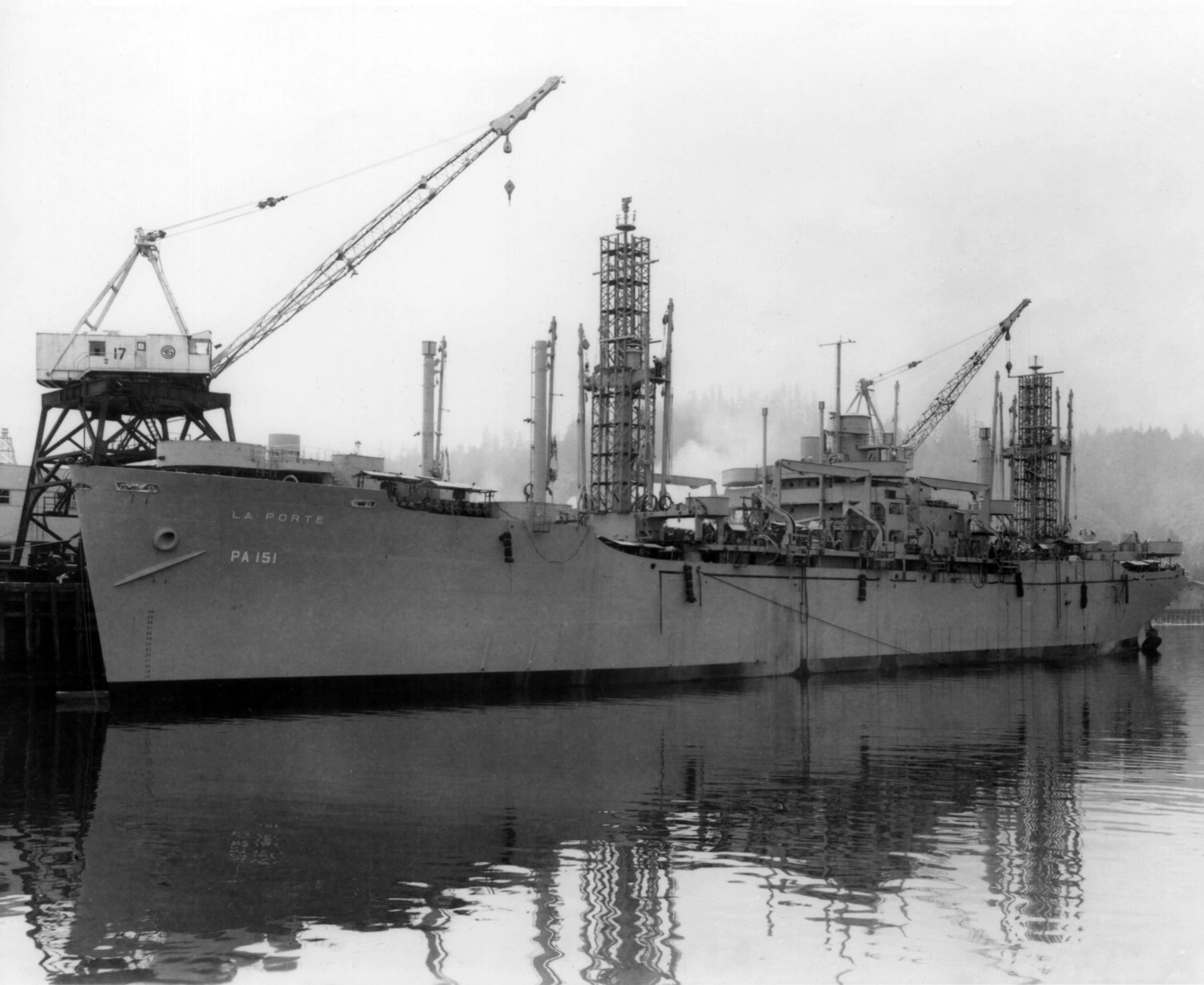
USS La Porte

La Porte was built by Oregon Shipbuilding Corporation. Her keel was laid on 15 May 1944. She was launched on 30 June and delivered on 14 August. Built for the United States Navy. To the USMC in 1946 and laid up in the James River. She was sold to New York shipbreakers in April 1973.

== Laredo Victory ==
Laredo Victory was built by Permanente Metals Corporation. Her keel was laid on 2 December 1944. She was launched on 24 January 1945 and delivered on 17 February. Built for the WSA, she was operated under the management of Matson Navigation Company. Laid up at Wilmington, North Carolina in 1947. Later transferred to the James River. She was scrapped at Kaohsiung in 1988.

== Las Vegas Victory ==
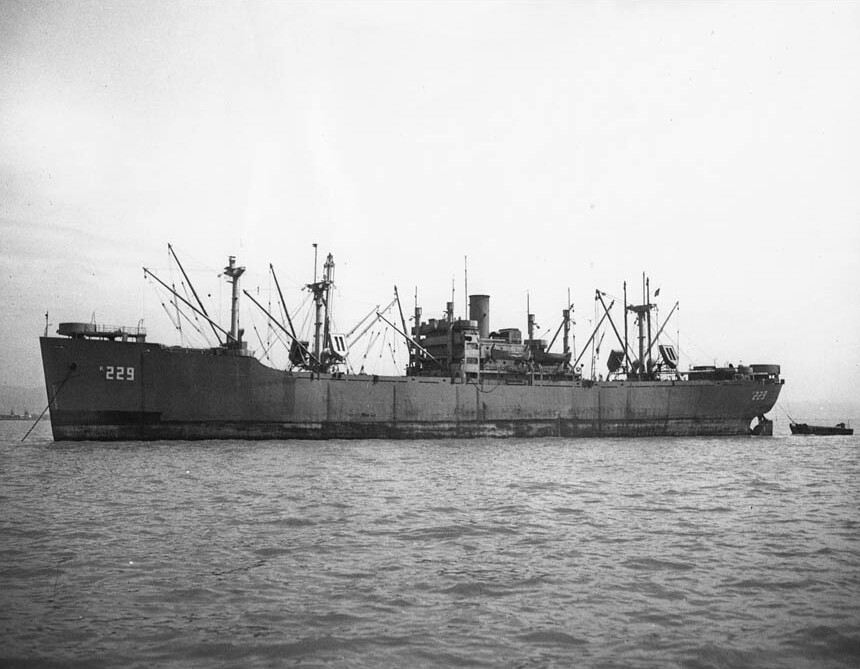
USS Las Vegas Victory

Las Vegas Victory was built by Permanente Metals Corporation. Her keel was laid on 7 July 1944. She was launched on 16 September and delivered on 25 October. Built for the United States Navy. To the USMC in 1947. Laid up in the James River. Returned to service in 1966 due to the Vietnam War. Operated under the management of American Mail Line. Laid up in Suisun Bay in 1969. She was scrapped in China in 1994.

== Latimer ==
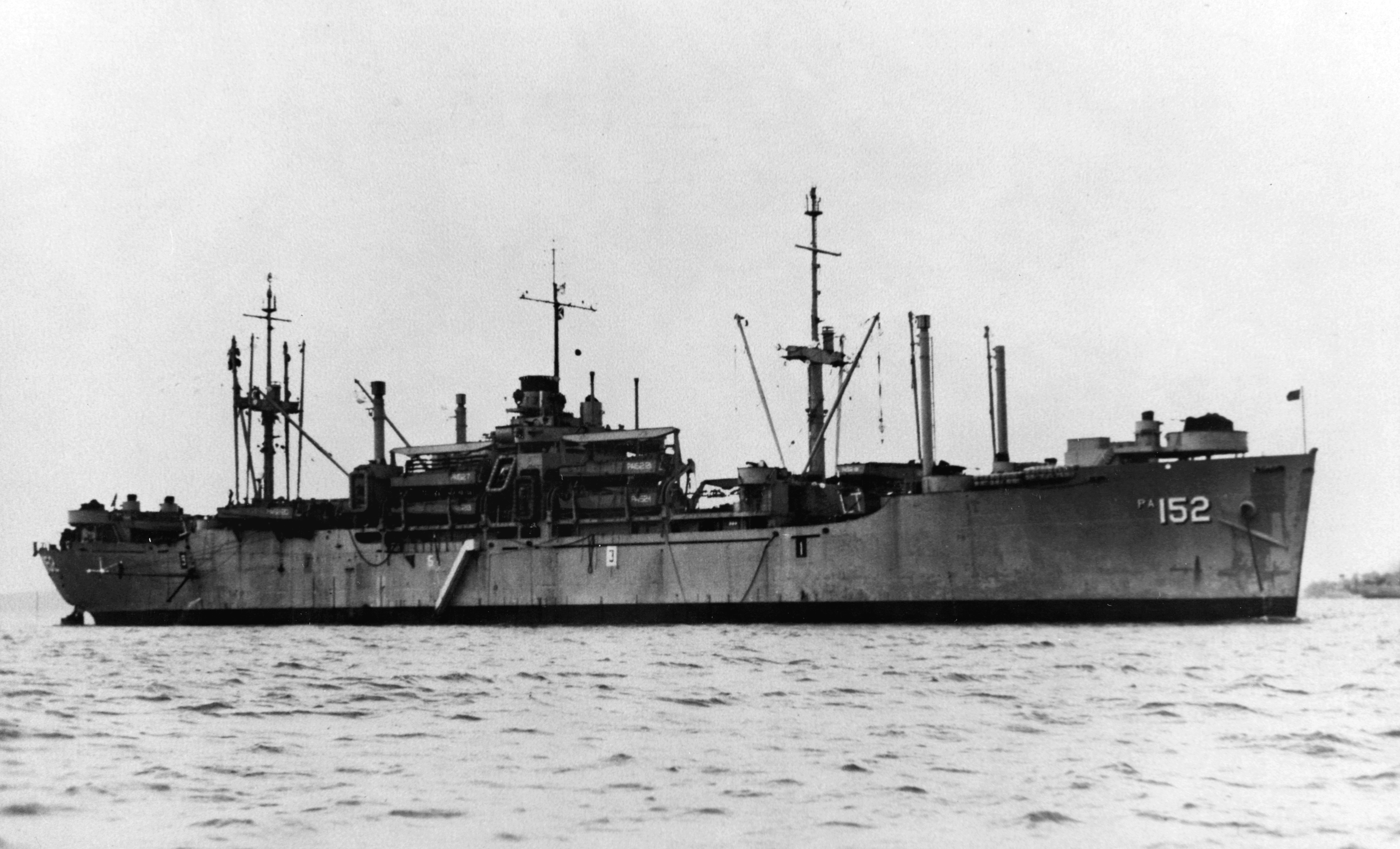
USS Latimer

Latimer was built by Oregon Shipbuilding Corporation. Her keel was laid on 19 May 1944. She was launched on 4 July and delivered on 28 August. Built for the United States Navy. Decommissioned in 1947. Recommissioned in 1950. Decommissioned in 1956. To the United States Maritime Administration in 1961. Laid up at Mobile. She was sold for scrapping at Panama City, Florida in October 1971.

== Lauderdale ==
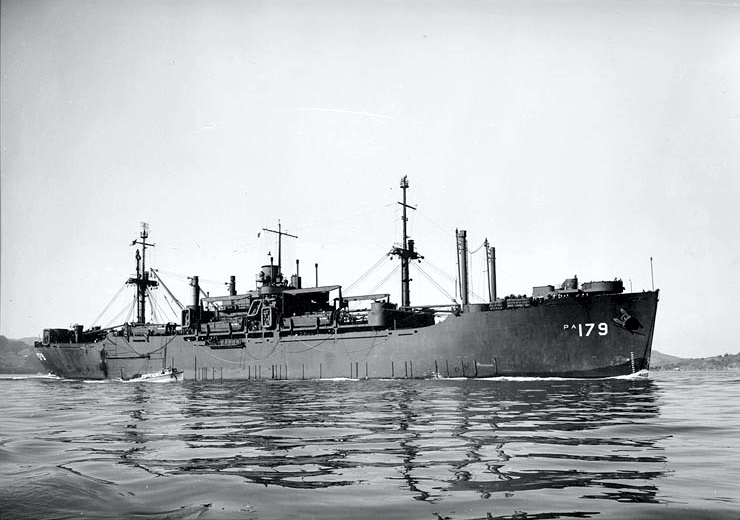
USS Lauderdale

Lauderdale was built by Oregon Shipbuilding Corporation. Her keel was laid on 14 October 1944. She was launched on 23 November and delivered on 12 December. Built for the United States Navy. To the USMC in 1946. Laid up in the James River. She was scrapped in 1983.

== Laurens ==
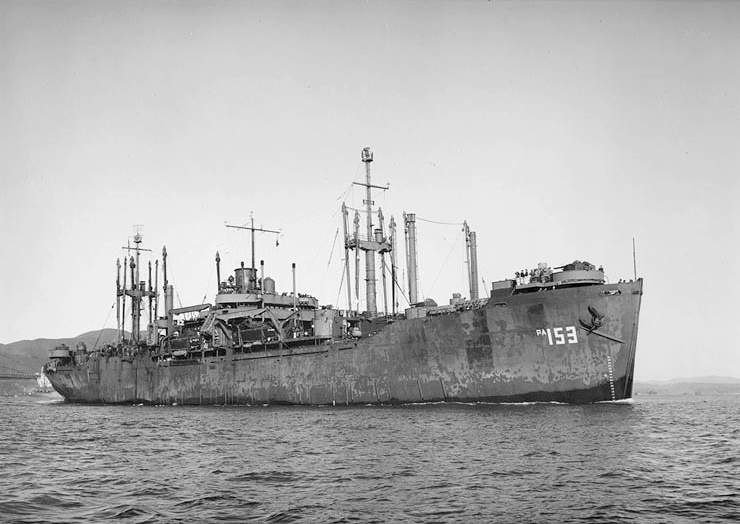
USS Laurens

Laurens was built by Oregon Shipbuilding Corporation. Her keel was laid on 23 May 1944. She was launched on 11 July and delivered on 6 September. Built for the United States Navy. To the USMC in 1946. Laid up in the James River. She was scrapped in 1989.

== Lavaca ==
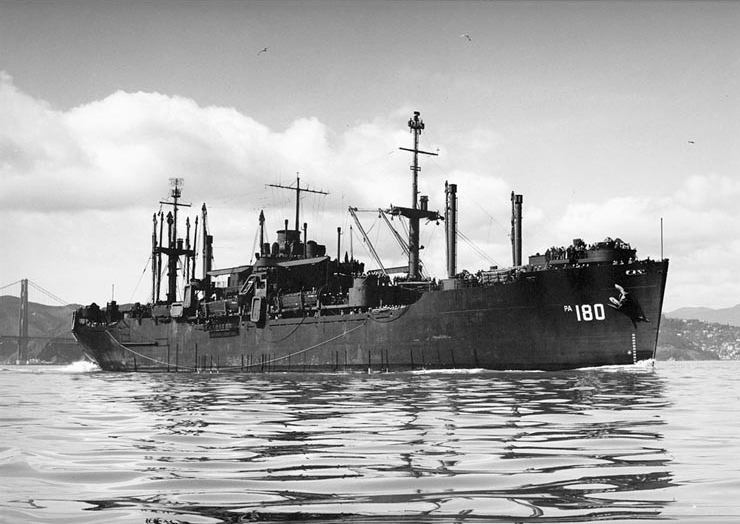
USS Lavaca

Lavaca was built by Oregon Shipbuilding Corporation. Her keel was laid on 17 October 1944. She was launched on 27 November and delivered on 17 December. Built for the United States Navy. Decommissioned in 1947. To the United States Maritime Administration in 1958. Laid up in the James River. She was scrapped in 1992.

== Lawrence Victory ==
Lawrence Victory was built by Oregon Shipbuilding Corporation. Her keel was laid on 6 March 1945. She was launched on 17 April and delivered on 15 May. Built for the WSA, she was operated under the management of McCormick Steamship Company. Laid up at Beaumont in 1949. Later transferred to the James River. She was scrapped at Recife, Brazil in 1986.

== Legion Victory ==
Legion Victory was built by Permanente Metals Corporation. Her keel was laid on 7 June 1944. She was launched on 21 August and delivered on 30 September. Built for the WSA, she was operated under the management of Lykes Brothers Steamship Company. Laid up at Beaumont in 1949. Sold in 1950 to Bloomfield Steamship Co., Houston, Texas. Renamed Marie Hamill in 1951. Sold in 1956 to States Marine Corporation, Delaware, New York and renamed Golden State. She collided with the Philippine passenger ship Pioneer Leyte off Manila, Philippines on 23 October 1966. Pioneer Leyte sank with the loss of 44 lives. Sold in 1956 to States Marine Lines, New York. She was scrapped at Kaohsiung in June 1970.

== Lehigh Victory ==
Lehigh Victory was a troop transport built by California Shipbuilding Corporation. Her keel was laid on 24 January 1945. She was launched on 17 March and delivered on 12 April. Built for the WSA, she was operated under the management of Lykes Brothers Steamship Company. To the United States Army Transportation Corps in 1947, renamed Lt. Bernard J. Ray. To the United States Department of Commerce in 1949. Laid up in the James River. She was scrapped at Brownsville, Texas in 1974.

== Lenawee ==
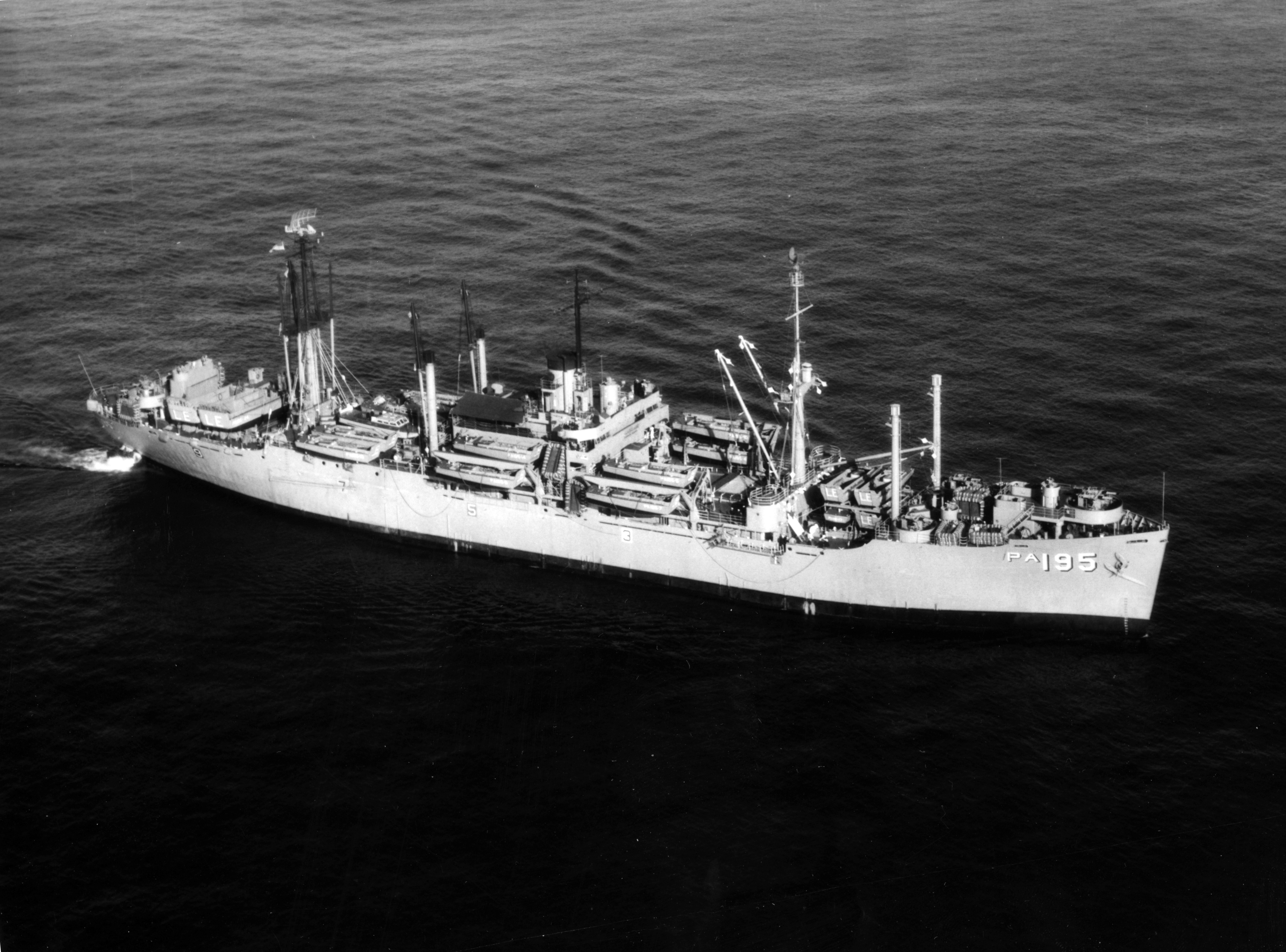
USS Lenawee

Lenawee was built by Kaiser Company, Vancouver, Washington. Her keel was laid on 26 May 1944. She was launched on 11 September and delivered on 11 October. Built for the United States Navy. Decommissioned in 1946. Recommissioned in 1950. Laid up in Suisun Bay in 1967. To the United States Maritime Administration in 1968. She was scrapped in the United States in 1975.

== Lewiston Victory ==
Lewiston Victory was a troop transport built by Oregon Shipbuilding Corporation. Her keel was laid on 23 October 1944. She was launched on 2 December and delivered on 29 January 1945. Built for the WSA, she was operated under the management of Pacific-Atlantic Steamship Company. Sold in 1947 to India Steamship Co., Calcutta, India and renamed Indian Merchant. Sold in 1972 to Pent-Ocean Steamships Ltd., Bombay, India and renamed Samudra Sai. She was driven ashore at Tuticorin, India on 25 September 1977. Subsequently refloated and scrapped at Bombay.

== Lincoln Victory ==
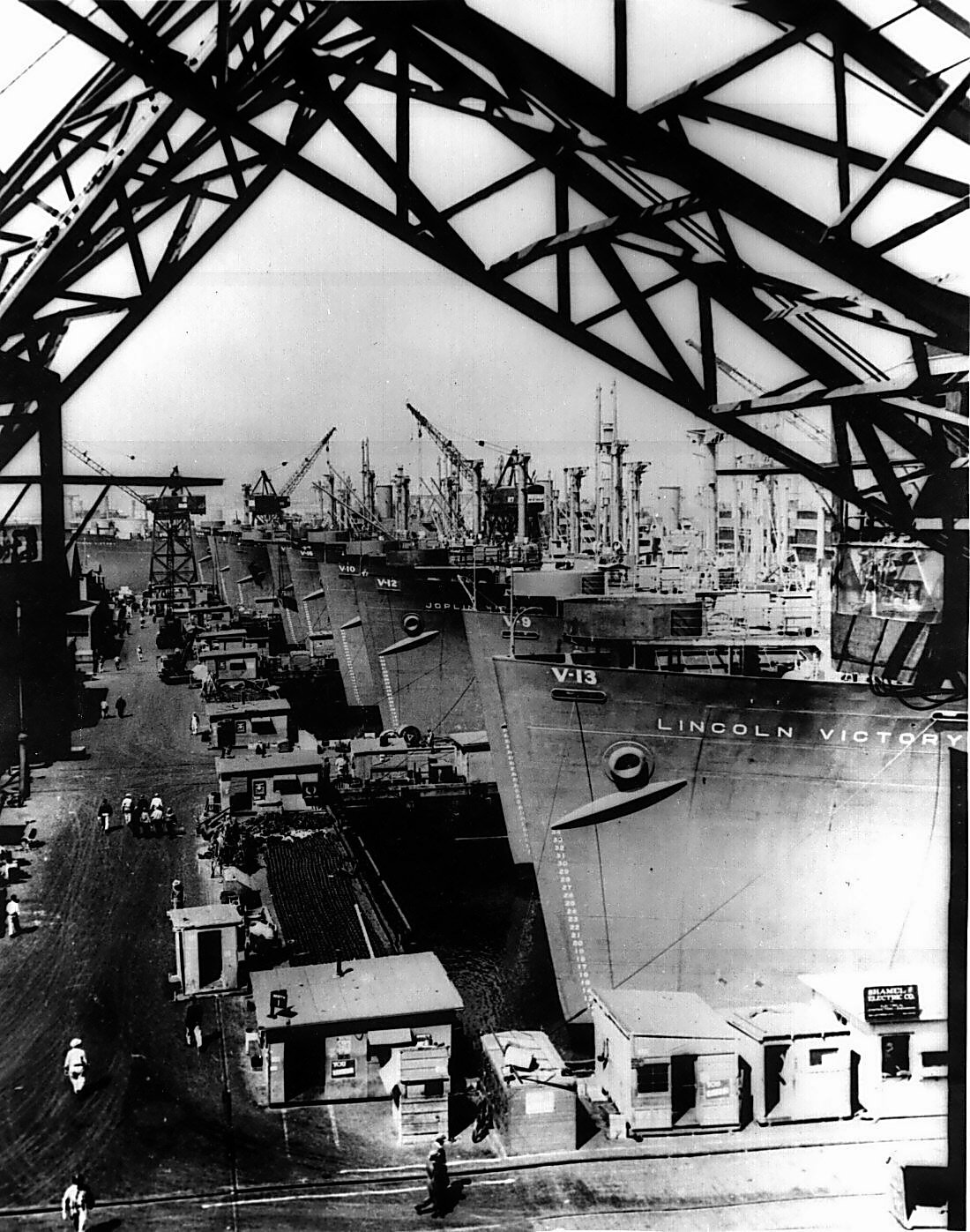
Lincoln Victory

Lincoln Victory was a troop transport built by California Shipbuilding Corporation. Her keel was laid on 26 February 1944. She was launched on 27 April and delivered on 15 June. Built for the WSA, she was operated under the management of Eastern Steamship Lines. Laid up in the James River in 1946. Sold in 1947 to Holland-Amerika Linie and renamed Aardijk. Renamed Aardyk in 1954. Sold in 1962 to Chinese Maritime Trust, Keelung, Taiwan and renamed Siang-Yung. She collided with the bank in the Panama Canal and sank on 6 December 1970. Salvage was a protracted affair. She was refloated on 29 October 1972 and towed to Balboa, Panama. She was scuttled south of Balboa (7°44′N 79°21′W) on 1 November 1972.

== Lindenwood Victory ==
Lindenwood Victory was built by Permanente Metals Corporation. Her keel was laid on 12 May 1945. She was launched on 23 June and delivered on 25 July. Built for the WSA, she was operated under the management of Alcoa Steamship Company. Laid up in the James River. Returned to service in 1966 due to the Vietnam War. Operated under the management of Matson Navigation Company. Laid up in Suisun Bay in 1973. She was scrapped in China in 1994.

== Linfield Victory ==
Linfield Victory was built by Oregon Shipbuilding Corporation. Her keel was laid on 20 April 1945. She was launched on 7 June and delivered on 3 July. Built for the WSA, she was operated under the management of McCormick Steamship Company. Laid up at Astoria in 1950. Later transferred to Beaumont. She was scrapped at Santander in 1986.

== Logan ==
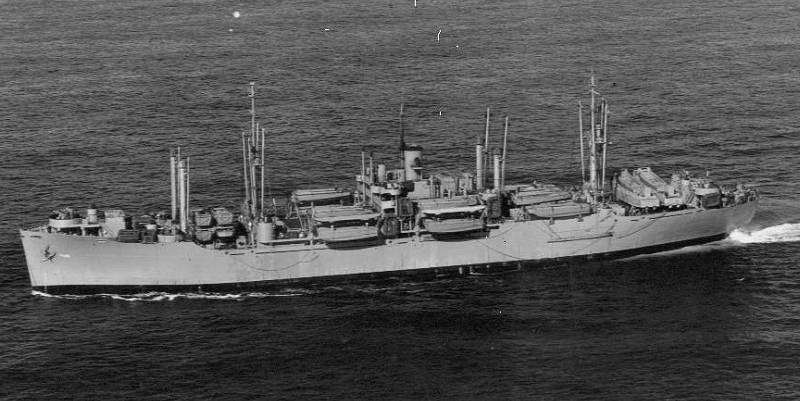
USS Logan

Logan was built by Kaiser Company. Her keel was laid on 27 May 1944. She was launched on1 19 September and delivered on 14 October. Built for the United States Navy. Decommissioned in 1946. Recommissioned in 1951. Decommissioned in 1955. To the United States Maritime Administration in 1959. Laid up in Suisun Bay. She was scrapped in 1979.

== Logan Victory ==
Logan Victory was built by Permanente Metals Corporation. Her keel was laid on 25 November 1944. She was launched on 16 January 1945 and delivered on 6 February. Built for the WSA, she was operated under the management of American-Hawaiian Steamship Company. She was struck by a kamikaze attack between Hokaji Shima and Koba Shima, Japan (26°10′N 127°16′E) on 6 April 1945 whilst on a voyage from San Francisco, California to Okinawa, Japan. She caught fire, exploded and sank.

== Loma Victory ==
Loma Victory was built by Oregon Shipbuilding Corporation. Her keel was laid on 23 November 1944. She was launched on 27 December and delivered on 25 January 1945. Built for the WSA, she was operated under the management of American South African Line. Laid up in the Hudson River in 1948. Later transferred to the James River. She was scrapped at Kaohsiung in 1984.

== Longview Victory ==
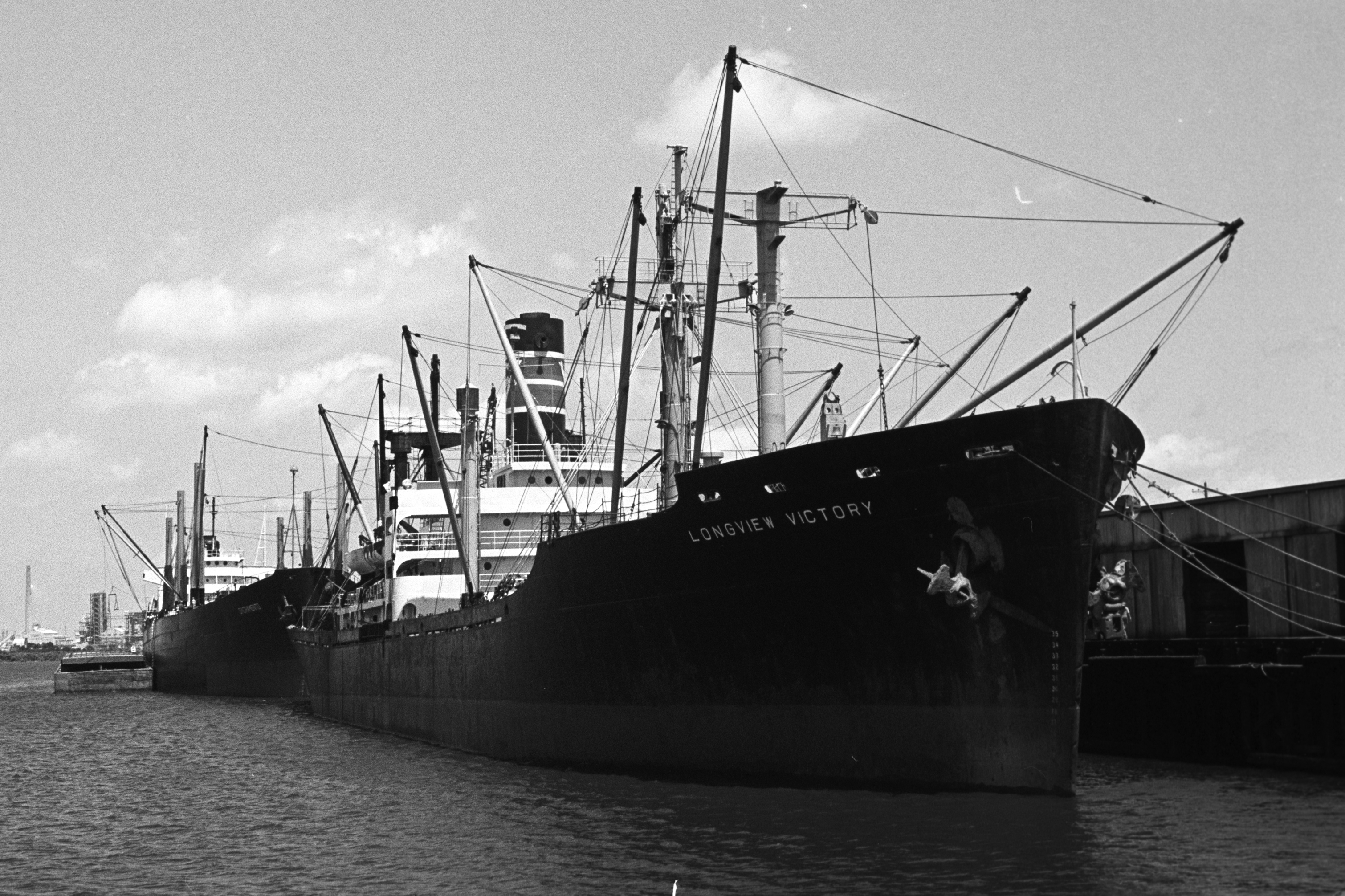
Longview Victory

Longview Victory was built by Oregon Shipbuilding Corporation. Her keel was laid on 20 October 1944. She was launched on 30 November and delivered on 5 January 1945. Built for the WSA, she was operated under the management of Alaska Steamship Company. Sold in 1949 to Victory Carriers Inc., New York. She was scrapped at Kaohsiung in 1974.

== Lowndes ==
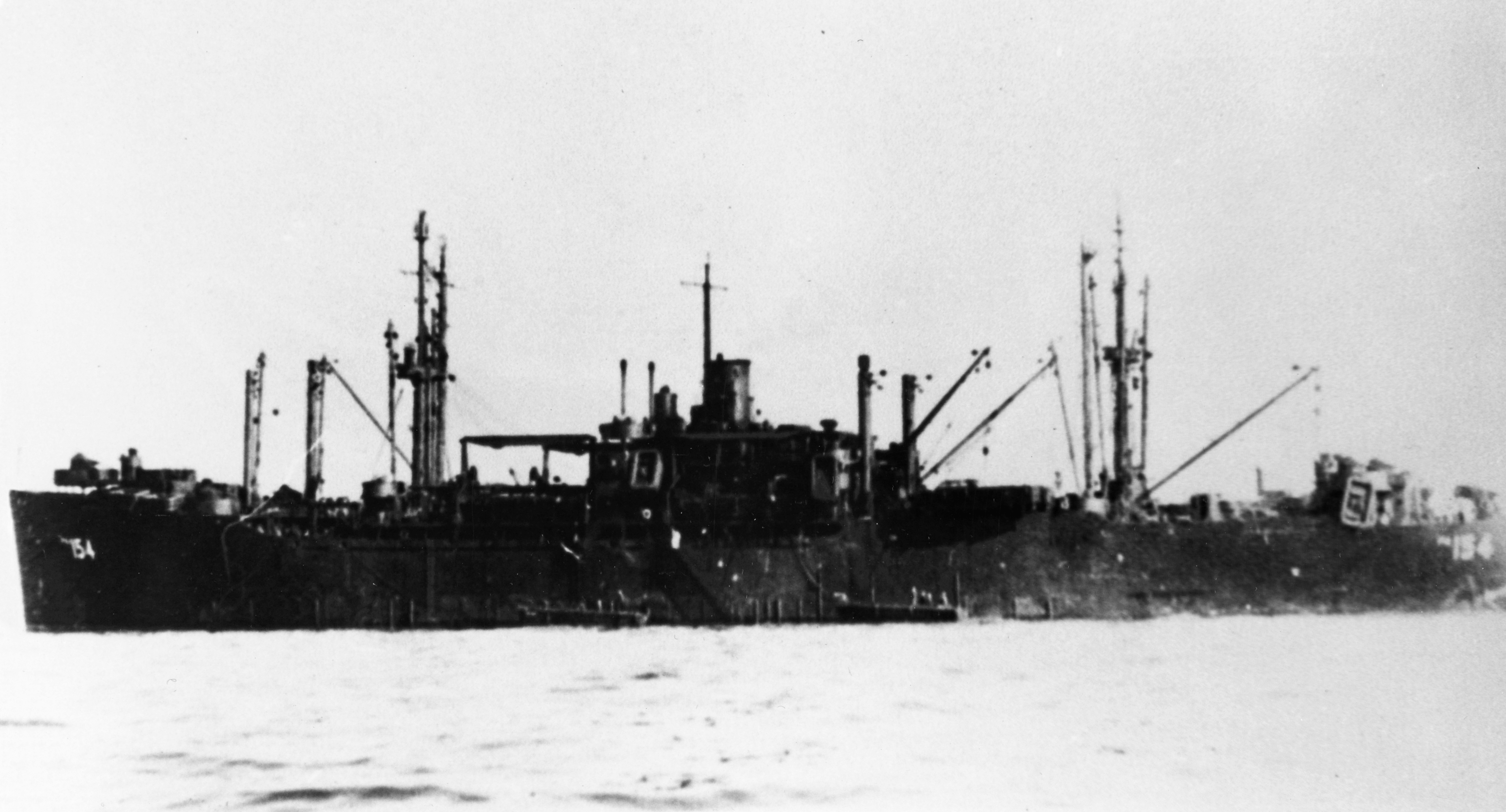
USS Lowndes

Lowndes was built by Oregon Shipbuilding Corporation. Her keel was laid on 26 May 1944. She was launched on 18 July and delivered on 14 September. Built for the United States Navy. To the USMC in 1946. Laid up in the James River. She was scrapped in 1983.

== Loyola Victory ==
Loyola Victory was built by Permanente Metals Corporation. Her keel was laid on 8 February 1945. She was launched on 21 March and delivered on 14 April. Built for the WSA, she was operated under the management of Sudden & Christenson. Laid up in Suisun Bay in 1950. Returned to service in 1966 due to the Vietnam War. Operated under the management of Matson Navigation Company. Laid up in Suisun Bay in 1973. She was scrapped in China in 1994.

== Lubbock ==
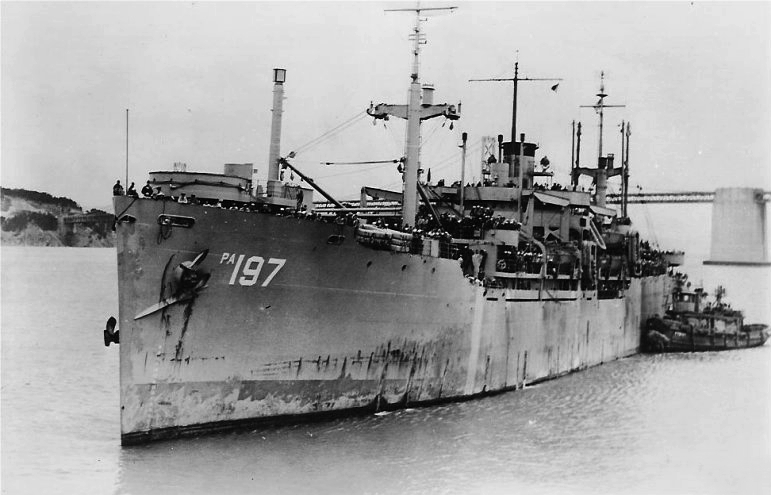
USS Lubbock

Lubbock was built by Kaiser Company. Her keel was laid on 2 June 1944. She was launched on 25 September and delivered on 18 October. Built for the United States Navy. Decommissioned in 1946 and laid up in Suisun Bay. To the United States Maritime Commission in 1959. She was scrapped in the United States in 1975.

== Luray Victory ==
Luray Victory was built by California Shipbuilding Corporation. Her keel was laid on 11 March 1944. She was launched on 11 May and delivered on 26 June. Built for the WSA, she was operated under the management of Black Diamond Steamship Company. She ran aground on the Goodwin Sands, in the English Channel on 30 January 1946. She was on a voyage from Baltimore, Maryland to Bremerhaven, Allied-occupied Germany. She subsequently broke up and was a total loss.

== Luxembourg Victory ==
Luxembourg Victory was built by Oregon Shipbuilding Corporation. Her keel was laid on 26 December 1943. She was launched on 28 February 1944 and delivered on 5 April. Built for the WSA, she was operated under the management of Lykes Brothers Steamship Company. Laid up in Suisun Bay in 1949. Chartered to the Military Sea Transportation Service in 1950. Sold in 1951 to States Steamship Corporation, Tacoma, Washington and renamed Pennsylvania. She suffered structural failure in the Pacific Ocean 600 nautical miles (1,100 km) north west of Cape Flattery, Washington on 9 January 1952 whilst on a voyage from Seattle, Washington to Yokohama, Japan and was abandoned. No further trace, presumed foundered. Last reported position 51°09′N 141°13′W.

== Luzerne ==
Luzerne was to have been built by Oregon Shipbuilding for the United States Navy. The order was cancelled on 14 August 1945.

== Lycoming ==
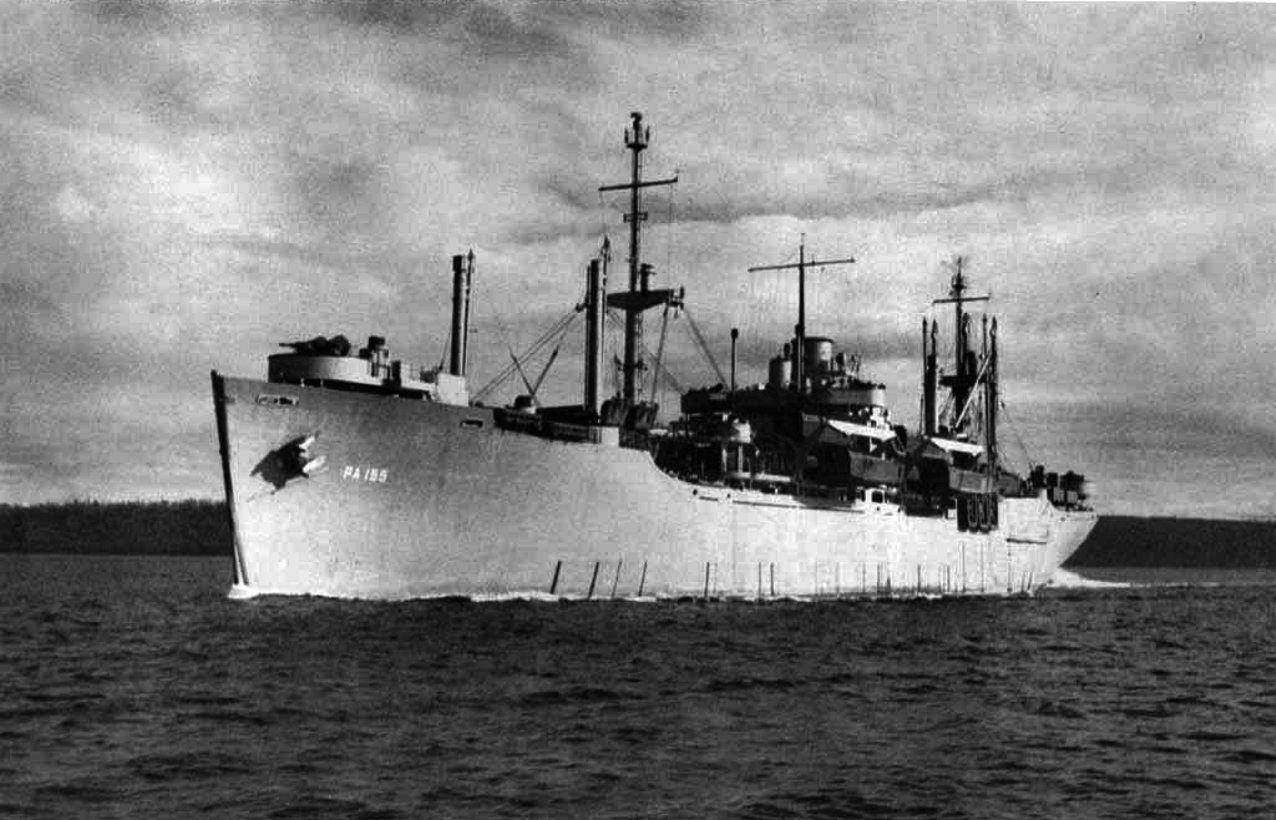
USS Lycoming

Lycoming was built by Oregon Shipbuilding Corporation. Her keel was laid on 30 May 1944. She was launched on 25 July and delivered on 20 September. Built for the United States Navy. To the USMC in 1946 and laid up in the James River. She was scrapped in the United States in 1973.

== Lynchburg Victory ==
Lynchburg Victory was built by Bethlehem Fairfield Shipyard. Her keel was laid on 16 July 1945. She was launched on 12 September and delivered on 8 October. Built for the WSA, she was operated under the management of United States Navigation Company. Sold in 1947 to St. Lawrence Navigation Co., New York and renamed Algonquin Victory. Sold in 1952 to Pocahontas Steamship Co., Wilmington, Delaware and renamed Pocohontas Fuel. converted to a collier by Newport News Shipbuilding Co., Newport News, Virginia. Now 7,828 GRT. Sold in 1965 to Marine Navigation Co., Wilmington, Delaware and renamed Marine Clipper. She was scrapped in Kaohsiung in April 1972.

== Lynn Victory ==
Lynn Victory was built by Bethlehem Fairfield Shipyard. Her keel was laid on 25 June 1945. She was launched on 15 August and delivered on 20 September. Built for the WSA, she was operated under the management of Isthmian Steamship Corporation. Management transferred to Sprague Steamship Co. later that year. Laid up in the James River in 1950. Returned to service in 1966 due to the Vietnam War. Laid up in the James River in 1973. She was scrapped at Alang in 1993.
