= Laurens =

Laurens may refer to:

== Places ==
=== United States ===
- Laurens County, Georgia
- Laurens, Iowa, a city
- Laurens (town), New York
- Laurens (village), New York
- Laurens, South Carolina, a city
- Laurens County, South Carolina
- Fort Laurens, an American Revolutionary War fort in what is now Ohio
- Mount Laurens, a mountain in Alaska

=== Elsewhere ===
- Laurens, Hérault, commune in the Hérault département, southern France
- Laurens Peninsula, Heard Island, Indian Ocean
  - Cape Laurens, on the Laurens Peninsula

== Other uses ==
- Laurens (given name)
- Laurens (surname)
- USS Laurens (APA-153), a World War II attack transport ship
- Laurens Railroad (1854-1881), a railroad in South Carolina
- Laurens Railway (1881-1894), successor of the Laurens Railroad
- Laurens (horse) (born 2015), thoroughbred racehorse

== See also ==
- Laurenz (name)
- Lawrence (disambiguation)
- Lourens (disambiguation)
