= Laurenz =

Laurenz can be a masculine given name, a middle name, or a surname. Notable people with the name include:

== Given name ==
- Laurenz Adlon (1849–1921), German hotelier
- Laurenz Berges, German photographer
- Laurenz Dehl (born 2001), German footballer
- Laurenz Forer (1580–1659), Swiss Jesuit theologian and controversialist
- Laurenz Herr (1787 – after 1850), Austrian painter
- Laurenz Janscha, Slovenian-Austrian artist
- Laurenz Lütteken (born 1964), German musicologist
- Laurenz Meyer (born 1948), German politician
- Laurenz Rex (born 1999), Belgian cyclist
- Laurenz Simoens (born 1998), Belgian footballer
- Laurenz Zellweger (1692–1764), Swiss physician, archivist, and politician

== Middle name ==
- Hermann Otto Laurenz Fischer, German-American professor
- Matthias Laurenz Gräff, Austrian-Greek artist and politician
- Hugo Laurenz August Hofmann von Hofmannsthal, Austrian writer
- Josef Laurenz Kunz, Austrian-American jurist
- Kurt Laurenz Metzler, Swiss sculptor
- Johann Laurenz Zuberbühler, Swiss merchant and official

== Surname ==
- Costa Laurenz (born 1993), German bobsledder and sprinter
- Karl Laurenz (1905–1955), German journalist and translator
- María Cristina Laurenz (born 1940), Argentine actress and singer
- Pedro Laurenz, Argentine tango music composer and director

== See also ==
- Laurens (disambiguation)
- Lauren (disambiguation)
- Laurence (disambiguation)
- Laurenzo
