= Faustin Herr =

Austrian painter

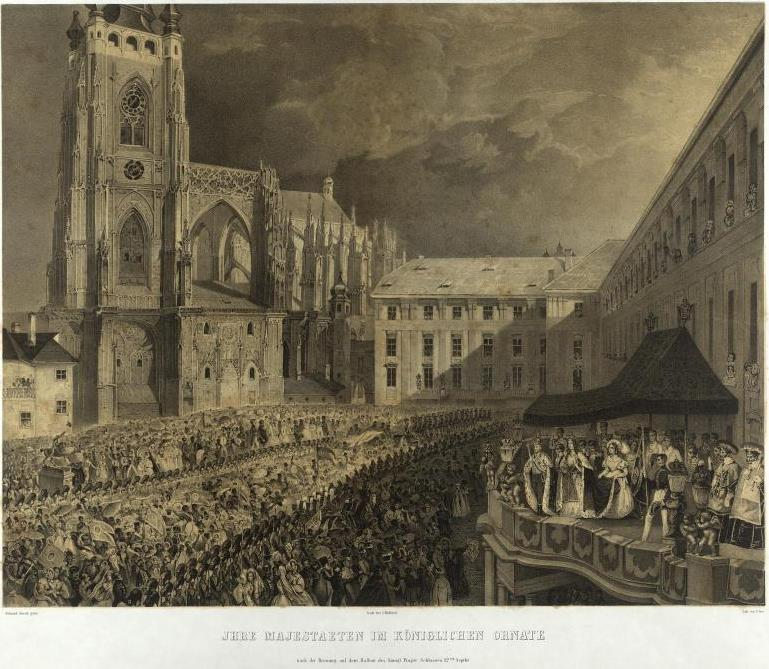
Katedrála sv. Víta od jihozápadu, by Faustin Herr and Eduard Gurk

Faustin Herr (fl. 1834 – 1849), alternatively spelled Faustinus Herr, Faust Heer, or Faust Herr, was an Austrian painter, lithographer, and miniaturist. His works were exhibited in the Viennese art exhibitions of 1834 and 1840.

Herr was born in Rottweil, and studied under Laurenz Herr in Vienna. Later he worked in Munich.

Herr collaborated with other artists such as Franz Eybl.

== See also ==
- Claudius Herr
