= Lourens =

Lourens may refer to:

Given name

- Lourens Adriaanse, South African rugby player
- Lourens Erasmus, South African rugby player
- Lourens van der Merwe, South African rugby referee
- Lourens Muller, South African politician and cabinet minister
- Lourens Baas Becking, Dutch botanist and microbiologist
- Lourens Alma Tadema, birth name of Dutch/British painter Lawrence Alma-Tadema

Surname

- Alan Lourens, Australian classical musician, composer, euphonium player and conductor
- Fajah Lourens, Dutch actress, model and disc jockey
- Werner Lourens, South African rugby union player
- Thys Lourens, South African rugby player
- Virginia Lourens, Dutch taekwondo practitioner
- Junita Kloppers-Lourens, South African politician

Others

- Lourens River Protected Natural Environment, a section of protected land along the Lourens River in Cape Town, South Africa

== See also ==
- Laurens (disambiguation)
