= Laurens (surname) =

Laurens is a French surname. Notable people with the surname include:

- André du Laurens (1558–1609), French doctor and gerontologist, physician to King Henry IV
- Camille Laurens (born 1957), French writer
- Camille Laurens, politician
- Guillemette Laurens (born 1957), French opera singer
- Henri Laurens (1885-1954), French sculptor and illustrator
- Henry Laurens (1724-1792), American political leader and diplomat
- Henry Laurens (scholar) (born 1954), French historian specialising in the Arab-Muslim world
- Henri Joseph Du Laurens (1719-1793), French novelist
- Jean-Joseph Bonaventure Laurens (1801-1890), French painter and musician
- Jean-Paul Laurens (1838-1921), French painter and sculptor
- John Laurens (1754-1782), American soldier and statesman
- Jonathan Laurens (born 1977), Venezuelan football player
- Jules Laurens (1825-1901), French artist
- Julien Laurens (born 1980), French journalist
- Leo Laurens, Belgian darts player
- Rose Laurens (1953–2018), French singer-songwriter
- Simon Laurens (born 1967), British para-equestrian
- Stephanie Laurens (born 1953), Australian author
- Suzanne Laurens, French sculptor
