= Suzanne Laurens =

French sculptor

Suzanne Laurens was a French sculptor, active in the early 20th-century.

Laurens was born at Verdun in France. She exhibited sculptures and models at the Salon des Artistes Francais in Paris during the 1920s, notably in 1929 when she was awarded a bronze medal and won the Prix de Longchamp.
