= Claudius Herr =

Austrian painter

Johann Claudius Herr (1775 – after 1838), alternatively spelled Klaudius Herr or Claudius Heer, was an Austrian painter and miniaturist. He was well known as an exceptional artist of the Vienna Porcelain Manufactory.

== Biography ==
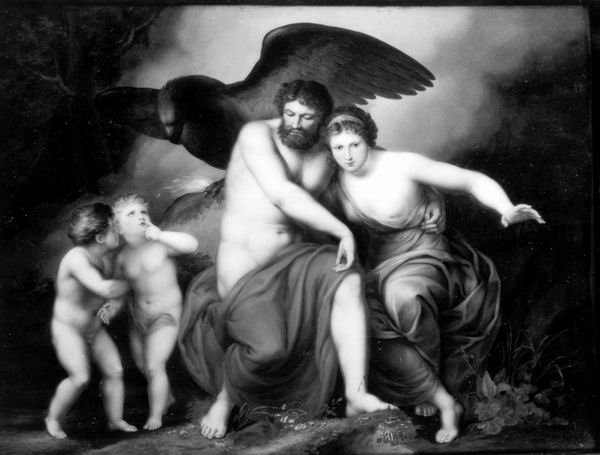
Jupiter and Io (1821), painting by Claudius Herr on Viennese porcelain.

Herr was born in 1775 to a family embroiled in the porcelain trade of Vienna. Several of his family members worked at the Vienna Porcelain Manufactory, including his father Johann (d. 1792) and his uncle Claudius. By the age of 10, he was already introduced to life at the factory. He showed an aptitude for drawing, and his talents were fostered by the resident artists. He became an apprentice in figure painting in 1791, and he became a student at the Academy of Vienna in 1793.

By 1801, Herr was considered one of the best painters in the trade. His works were highly valued and he was a top earner at the factory. He mainly decorated smaller items such tobacco cans, lids, coffee mugs, pomade tins and tobacco pipes until 1806. He then moved primarily to plates, which he painted with scenes of mythological events. He started producing larger tableaus on serving platters in 1816. Between 1818 and 1819, Herr was one of the artists commissioned on a gift of 62 porcelain plates for the Duke of Wellington from King Frederick William III of Prussia.

Herr was an expert at reproducing famous works on porcelain, and his skill outpaced many of his contemporaries. He became a favorite of Emperor Francis I, who often would gift plates and cups decorated by Herr. His reproduction of Jupiter and Thetis was received at the Viennese Art Exhibition in 1834.

Beginning in 1831, Herr took longer pauses from the factory. He deferred work to his brother Laurenz Herr (1787 – after 1850), whose artistry was also highly praised. He ceased working at the factory altogether in 1838.
