= Laurenzo =

Laurenzo is an Italian surname. Notable people with the name include:

- Jenna Laurenzo, writer, director, and star of the 2018 film Lez Bomb
- Ninfa Laurenzo (1924–2001), American restaurateur
- Tomas Laurenzo (born 1977), Uruguayan artist
