= USS Lauderdale =

1944 Haskell-class attack transport

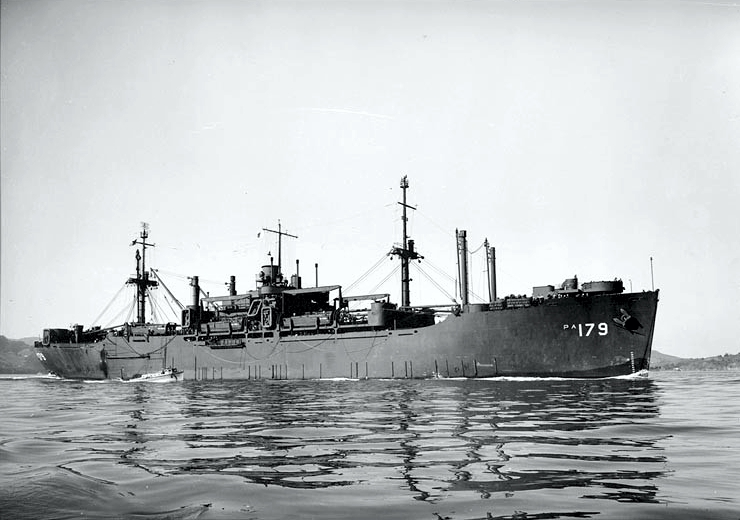
- USS Lauderdale (APA-179) in San Francisco Bay, c. 1945

History

United States
- Name: USS Lauderdale
- Namesake: Lauderdale County, Alabama; Lauderdale County, Mississippi; Lauderdale County, Tennessee
- Ordered: as type VC2-S-AP5
- Launched: 23 November 1944
- Commissioned: 12 December 1944
- Decommissioned: 25 April 1946
- Fate: Scrapped, 2005

General characteristics
- Displacement: 12,450 tons (full load)
- Length: 455 ft 0 in (138.68 m)
- Beam: 62 ft 0 in (18.90 m)
- Draught: 24 ft 0 in (7.32 m)
- Speed: 19 knots
- Capacity: 150,000 cu. ft, 2,900 tons
- Complement: 56 Officers 480 Enlisted
- Armament: one 5 in (130 mm) gun mount, twelve 40 mm gun mounts, ten 20 mm gun mounts

USS Lauderdale (APA-179/LPA-179) was a Haskell-class attack transport acquired by the U.S. Navy during World War II for the task of transporting troops to and from combat areas.

== World War II service ==
Lauderdale (APA-179) was launched under United States Maritime Commission contract 23 November 1944 by Oregon Shipbuilding Corp., Portland, Oregon; sponsored by Mrs. J. H. Blockey; and commissioned 12 December 1944 at Astoria, Oregon.

Departing Seattle, Washington, 28 December 1944 Lauderdale steamed via San Francisco, California, to San Pedro, Los Angeles, where she arrived 2 January 1945. After shakedown off the California coast, she sailed from Los Angeles, California, to Pearl Harbor 13 to 19 February for amphibious landing exercises. She then embarked soldiers of the U.S. 10th Army and departed Honolulu 17 March for the western Pacific Ocean. Steaming via Eniwetok, she reached Ulithi 31 March.

=== Lauderdale lands her troops and equipment on Okinawa ===
On 7 April Lauderdale sailed in convoy for the Ryukyus. She arrived off Hagushi, Okinawa, 11 April; despite frequent air alerts, she debarked all troops and unloaded cargo by 17 April. Between 18 April and 14 July she remained at Hagushi, where she served as receiving ship for uninjured survivors of ships that were damaged or sunk during the protracted, but successful, struggle for American control of the Ryukyus. She embarked survivors from more than 30 ships and landing craft. In addition she served as a detention ship, for captured Japanese prisoners of war.

=== End-of-war operations ===
Relieved 14 July by USS Crescent City (APA-21), Lauderdale departed Hagushi the next day with 1,132 military passengers embarked for transportation to the United States. Steaming via Ulithi and Eniwetok, she reached San Diego, California, 6 August, discharged her passengers, then steamed to Portland, Oregon, 23 to 26 August to embark 1,045 occupation troops. She departed Portland 28 August, touched Eniwetok 9 September, and arrived Saipan, Marianas, 13 September. From then until 8 November she transported men and supplies to Tinian, Guam, Iwo Jima, and the Japanese home islands. Laden with 1,706 passengers, she departed Saipan 9 November on an "Operation Magic Carpet" passage to the U.S. west coast, where she arrived San Pedro 24 November.

Between 5 December and 7 January 1946 Lauderdale completed another "Magic Carpet" cruise, carrying 1,915 sailors from Manus, Admiralties, to Seattle, Washington. On 26 January she departed Puget Sound and sailed via San Francisco and the Panama Canal to the U.S. East Coast. Arriving Lynnhaven Roads 6 March, she decommissioned 25 April at Norfolk, Virginia. She was returned to War Shipping Administration (WSA) and placed in the National Defense Reserve Fleet. Lauderdale was berthed in the James River, Virginia. She was scrapped in 2005.

== Military awards and honors ==
Lauderdale received one battle star for World War II service.
