= USS Lubbock =

American naval vessel

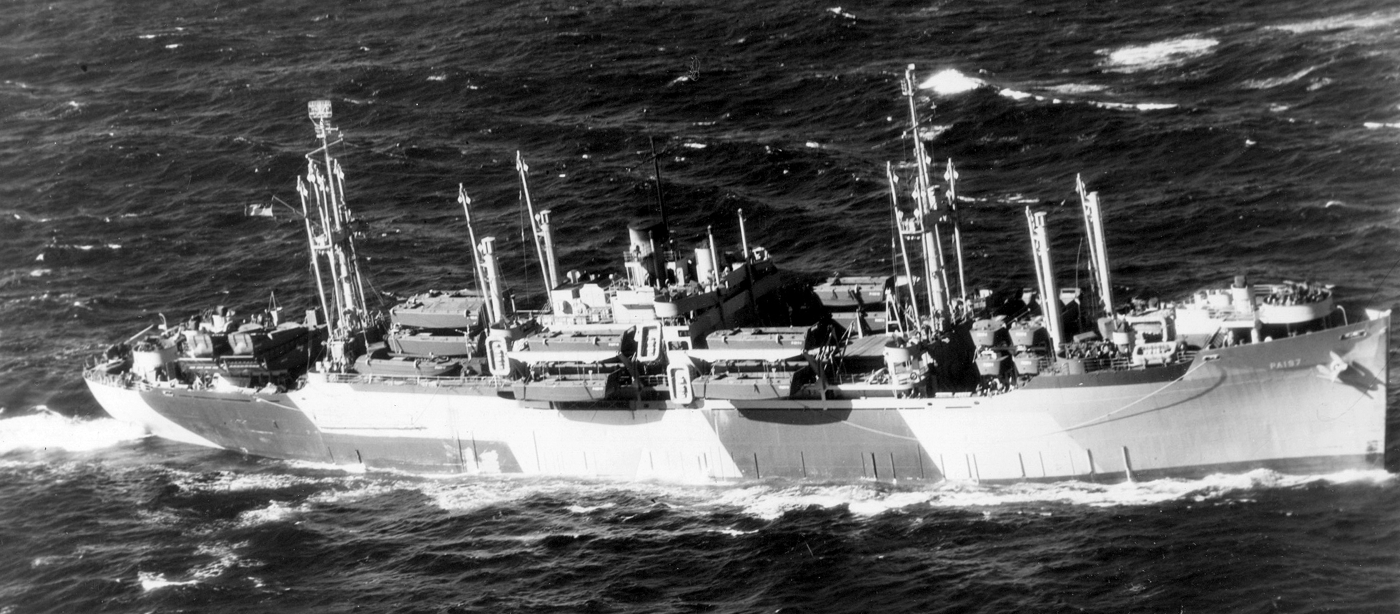

History

United States
- Name: USS Lubbock
- Namesake: Lubbock County, Texas
- Ordered: as type VC2-S-AP5; MCV hull 665
- Laid down: 2 June 1944
- Launched: 25 September 1944
- Acquired: 18 October 1944
- Commissioned: 18 October 1944
- Decommissioned: 14 December 1946
- Stricken: 1 October 1958
- Fate: Scrapped, May 1975

General characteristics
- Displacement: 14,833 (full load)
- Length: 455 ft 0 in (138.68 m)
- Beam: 62 ft 0 in (18.90 m)
- Draught: 28 ft 1 in (8.56 m)
- Speed: 17 knots
- Boats & landing craft carried: two LCM, twelve LCVP, three LCPU
- Capacity: 150,000 cu. ft, 2,900 tons
- Complement: 56 Officers 480 Enlisted
- Armament: one 5 in (130 mm) gun mount, twelve 40 mm gun mounts, ten 20 mm gun mounts

USS Lubbock (APA-197) was a Haskell-class attack transport in service with the United States Navy from 1944 to 1946. She was scrapped in 1975.

== History ==
Lubbock was laid down under a Maritime Commission contract by Kaiser Shipbuilding Co., Vancouver, Washington, 2 June 1944; launched 25 September 1944; sponsored by Mrs. Price Beeson; acquired by the Navy 18 October 1944; and commissioned the same day.

=== World War II ===
After shakedown, Lubbock departed Port Hueneme, California, 2 December for amphibious training in the Hawaiian Islands. Following a month of intensive exercises, the transport loaded with troops sortied with Transport Division 48 to join Vice Adm. Spruance's U.S. 5th Fleet in the western Pacific Ocean. She stopped briefly at Eniwetok and Saipan before proceeding to the Volcano Islands for the assault on Iwo Jima. The struggle for this tiny island, needed for its valuable airstrip, was to be one of the bloodiest and most inspirational American victories of the war. Arriving off the beaches 19 February, Lubbock lowered her boats in the morning hours and the embarked marines stormed ashore. The transport remained in the area for 9 days, unloading cargo and receiving casualties from the beach.

Departing Iwo Jima 28 February, she transported casualties to Guam before sailing on to Espiritu Santo, where she arrived 15 March. Lubbock took on troops, medical supplies, and cargo for the planned assault on Okinawa, the last barrier on the road to Japan. Sailing 25 March the transport made her way to the enemy held island via Ulithi, entering the Hagushi transport area off the west coast of Okinawa 9 April. Under constant attack from Japanese air raids, Lubbock unloaded her troops and cargo in 5 days, sailing on the 14th for Saipan.

After repairs at Ulithi, Lubbock arrived Leyte, Philippine Islands, 30 May, and for the rest of the war operated as an amphibious troop training ship in the Philippines. She continued operations in the Philippines as part of the occupation force until 14 October when she sailed on her first "Operation Magic Carpet" cruise to the United States. Over the next 8 months Lubbock completed three additional cruises to the Far East, and returned veterans from the Philippines, Japan, China, and Samoa.

=== Decommissioning and fate ===
The transport arrived San Francisco, California, 14 July 1946 from her final voyage and decommissioned at Mare Island Navy Yard 14 December 1946. Lubbock was assigned to the Pacific Reserve Fleet and struck from the Navy list 1 October 1958. She was sold for scrapping on 18 April 1975, to Nicolai Joffe Corp., and was delivered to the breakers on 15 May 1975.

== Awards ==
Lubbock received two battle stars for World War II service.
