= Laurenz Herr =

Austrian painter

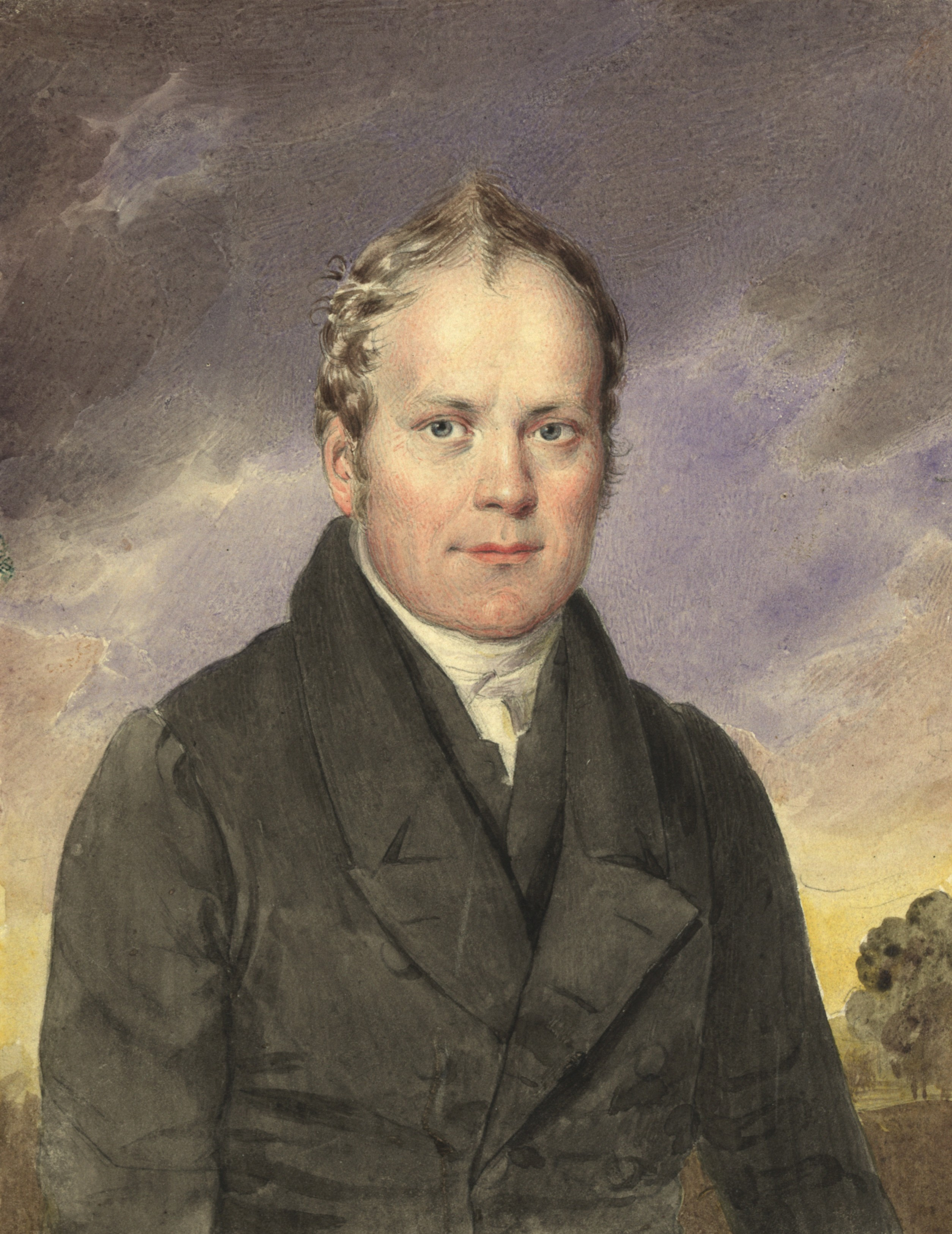
Portrait of Herr, possibly by Alois van Anreiter, c. 1830

Laurenz Herr (1787 – after 1850), alternatively spelled Lorenz Herr or Laurenz Heer, was an Austrian enamel painter. He was an artist of the Vienna Porcelain Manufactory.

== Biography ==
Laurenz, following in the footsteps of his brother Claudius, attended the Academy of Vienna at the age of twelve. Throughout his education, he was awarded three Gundel-Prizes. Herr was hired at the Vienna Porcelain Manufactory in 1804. Herr's specialty was painting onyx cameos, but he also produced portraits. He was most active in the factory from 1806 through 1831, and again briefly in 1833. His works fetched some of the highest prices compared to other factory artists, but never surpassed those of his brother.

Faustin Herr studied under Laurenz in Vienna, and went on to became a lithographer.
