= USS Laurens =

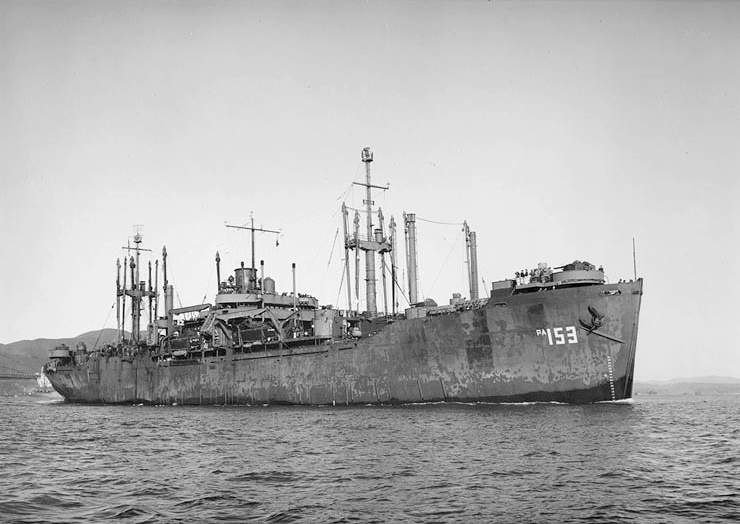

History

United States
- Name: USS Laurens
- Namesake: Laurens County, Georgia; Laurens County, South Carolina
- Ordered: as type VC2-S-AP5
- Laid down: 23 May 1944
- Launched: 11 July 1944
- Acquired: 7 September 1944
- Commissioned: 7 September 1944
- Decommissioned: 10 April 1946
- Stricken: 1 May 1946
- Fate: Scrapped, 1988

General characteristics
- Displacement: 12,450 tons (full load)
- Length: 455 ft 0 in (138.68 m)
- Beam: 62 ft 0 in (18.90 m)
- Draught: 24 ft 0 in (7.32 m)
- Speed: 19 knots
- Complement: 536
- Armament: one 5 in (130 mm) gun mount, twelve 40 mm gun mounts, ten 20 mm gun mounts

USS Laurens (APA-153) was a Haskell-class attack transport in service with the United States Navy from 1944 to 1946. She was scrapped in 1988.

== History ==
Laurens was launched by Oregon Shipbuilding Corp., Portland, Oregon, under Maritime Commission contract; sponsored by Mrs. James C. Black; acquired by the Navy 7 September 1944; and commissioned the same day.

=== World War II ===
After shakedown along the California coast, Laurens departed Oakland, California, 26 October 1944, arriving Lae, New Guinea, 12 November. For the next month she operated out of New Guinea and New Caledonia, training in preparation for the Lingayen Gulf landings. Forwarded to Guadalcanal in mid-December, Laurens loaded over 1,400 troops and proceeded to Manus, Admiralty Islands.

Laurens departed Manus 2 January 1945 and arrived in Lingayen Gulf to land troops off San Fabian, Philippine Islands, 9 days later. She stood out of Lingayen Gulf on the 12th, returning to New Guinea 27 January. During February she made another cruise to the Philippines transporting forces to Leyte and remained there in preparation for the Okinawa campaign.

On 27 March 1945 Laurens steamed out of Leyte Gulf for Okinawa, doorstep to Japan. The first wave of troops hit the beach 1 April 1945 while Laurens arrived in the transport area 9 miles offshore. The continued landing troops and cargo until she sailed for Saipan, 6 April arriving there 4 days later.

During May Laurens was under repair at Pearl Harbor and San Diego, California, before returning Eniwetok 15 June 1945. For the next 6 weeks the transport operated among the islands, transferring troops and supplies to various staging areas. After loading war veterans at Ulithi 31 July, Laurens sailed the same day for San Francisco, arriving there 1 day before the end of the war.

=== Operation Magic Carpet ===
Following the Japanese surrender, Laurens carried occupation troops to the Japanese home islands, then formed a unit of the "Operation Magic Carpet" fleet assigned to bring the fighting men home. She returned to Portland, Oregon, 8 January 1946, on her final "Magic Carpet" run from the Far East. The following month she sailed for the eastern seaboard.

=== Decommissioning and fate ===
Laurens decommissioned 10 April 1946 at Norfolk, Virginia, and returned to War Shipping Administration (WSA) 13 April 1946. On 2 May 1956 Laurens entered the National Defense Reserve Fleet in the Hudson River, New York, where she remained. She was eventually struck from the Navy List on 1 May 1946 and was sold for scrapping in 1988.

== Awards ==
Laurens received two battle stars for World War II service.
