= SS Ebani =

Cargo steamship that was a hospital ship in WW1

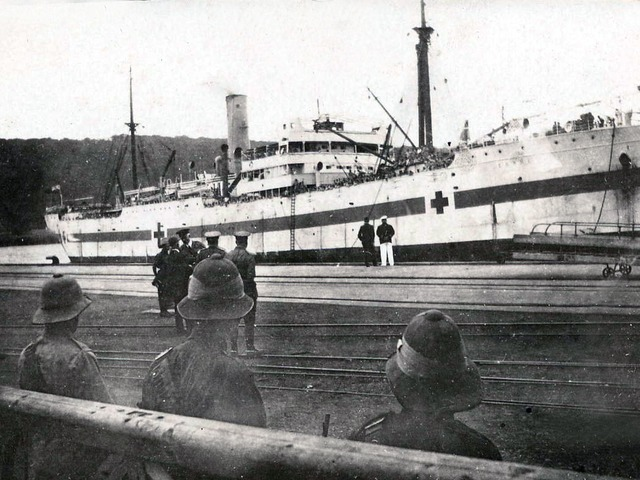
- Ebani as a hospital ship in East Africa

History
- Name: 1912: Ebani; 1938: Maristella; 1941: Rio Atuel; 1946: Maristella
- Namesake: 1938: Italian for "Star of the Sea"; 1941: Atuel River
- Owner: 1912: British & African SN Co; 1934: Elder Dempster Lines; 1938: Fratelli Rituzzo; 1941: Government of Argentina; 1946: Fratelli Rituzzo
- Operator: 1912: Elder, Dempster & Co; 1915: (United Kingdom) Admiralty; 1941: Flota Mercante del Estado
- Port of registry: 1912: (United Kingdom) Liverpool; 1938: (Kingdom of Italy) Genoa; 1941: (Argentina) Buenos Aires; 1946: (Italy) Genoa
- Builder: Palmers S&I Co, Hebburn
- Yard number: 820
- Launched: 12 June 1912
- Completed: 21 October 1912
- Commissioned: into Royal Navy, 8 August 1915
- Decommissioned: from Royal Navy, 12 January 1919
- Identification: UK official number 131462; until 1933: code letters HWTS; from 1930: call sign GRLC; from 1938: call sign IBGW; from 1941: call sign LOIO
- Fate: scrapped 1950

General characteristics
- Type: cargo ship
- Tonnage: 4,862 GRT, 2,963 NRT
- Length: 405.1 ft (123.5 m)
- Beam: 54.0 ft (16.5 m)
- Depth: 23.5 ft (7.2 m)
- Decks: 2
- Installed power: 566 NHP
- Propulsion: 1 × triple-expansion engine; 1 × screw
- Speed: 11 knots (20 km/h)
- Capacity: cargo: 531,000 cu ft (15,000 m^{3}), including 2,200 cu ft (62 m^{3}) refrigerated; passengers: 12; as hospital ship: 508 patients
- Crew: 40
- Notes: sister ships: Eboe, Eloby, Elele, Egba, Egori

SS Ebani was a cargo steamship that was built in England in 1912 and scrapped in Belgium in 1950. She was renamed Maristella in 1938, Rio Atuel in 1941, and reverted to Maristella in 1946.

She was built for the British & African Steam Navigation Company (BASN), which was part of Elder, Dempster & Co. She was the hospital ship HMHS Ebani from 1914 until 1919. Elder, Dempster sold her to Italian owners in 1938. Argentina interned her in 1940, took her over in 1941, and returned her to her owners in 1946. She was damaged by a mine in the North Sea in 1948, and not repaired.

She was the second of three Elder, Dempster ships that were called Ebani. The first was a steamship that was launched in 1896, and sold and renamed in 1898. The third was a motor ship that was launched in 1952, and sold and renamed in 1977.

== Building ==
Between 1912 and 1914 Elder, Dempster took delivery of a class of six cargo steamships, built by three British shipbuilders. Palmers Shipbuilding and Iron Company at Hebburn on the River Tyne launched Ebani and Eboe in 1912. Irvine's Shipbuilding and Dry Dock Company in West Hartlepool on the River Tees launched Eloby in 1912 and Elele in 1913. Harland & Wolff in Govan on the River Clyde launched Egba in 1913 and Egori in 1914.

Palmer's built Ebani as yard number 820. She was launched on 12 June 1912 and completed on 21 October. Her registered length was 405.1 ft (123.5 m), her beam was 54.0 ft (16.5 m), and her depth was 23.5 ft (7.2 m). Her holds had capacity for 531,000 cubic feet (15,000 m^{3}) of cargo, including 2,200 cubic feet (62 m^{3}) refrigerated. She had berths for 12 passengers, and carried a crew of 40. Her tonnages were 4,862 GRT and 2,963 NRT.

Ebani had a single screw, driven by a three-cylinder triple-expansion engine of Palmer's own manufacture. It was rated at 566 NHP, and gave her a speed of 11 knots (20 km/h).

BASN registered Ebani at Liverpool. Her United Kingdom official number was 131462 and her code letters were HWTS.

== First World War ==
On the night of 4–5 August 1914 the United Kingdom declared war on Germany and Austria-Hungary. Two days later, on 7 August, Ebani was en route from Sierra Leone to Monrovia when the gunboat HMS Dwarf stopped her off the coast of West Africa.

=== South West Africa campaign ===
South Africa mobilised to invade German South West Africa. A voluntary committee in Cape Town chartered Ebani, and had her converted into a hospital ship with cots for 300 to 400 patients, or 508 in an emergency. Accommodation for patients was racially segregated. On 1 December 1914 Viscountess Buxton inaugurated Ebani at Cape Town as a hospital ship. The ship's company included 13 nurses and 36 medical personnel, provided by the St John Ambulance and the Natal Medical Corps.

That month the ship carried a field ambulance unit to Walvis Bay, arriving on 24 December. She stayed at Walvis Bay as a temporary base hospital until a permanent one was established ashore, and left on 28 January 1915. During February, March, May and June 1915 she made a number of trips evacuating casualties from Walvis Bay to South Africa.

In July 1915 German forces in the colony surrendered. On 8 August South Africa transferred Ebani, her equipment, and her South African medical personnel, to the UK Admiralty.

=== Mediterranean ===
On 1 September 1915 Ebani called at Zanzibar. By late October she was in Alexandria, Egypt, embarking casualties to take to the UK. On 31 October she left Alexandria, and a day or two later she saw a U-boat sink a cargo ship by shellfire. The U-boat stopped Ebani, examined her papers, and allowed her to rescue survivors from the cargo ship.

=== East Africa Campaign ===
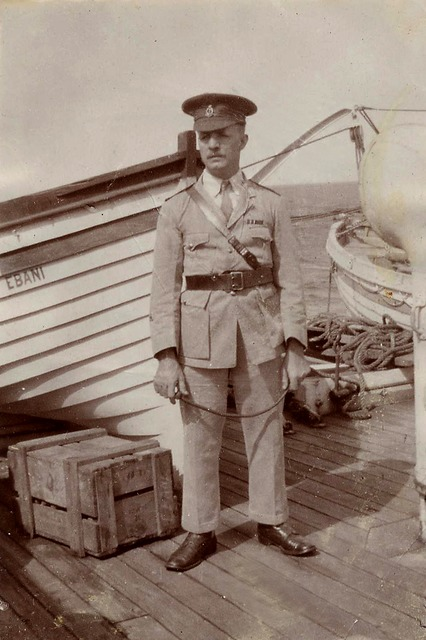
A patient on Ebani's boat deck; date unknown

On 1 February 1916 Ebani reached Port Said in Egypt. By 11 March she was in Kilindini Harbour in Kenya. From then until the Armistice of 11 November 1918 she supported the Allies' East African Campaign. She operated mostly in the Indian Ocean, evacuating casualties from ports in Kenya and German East Africa. She called at Kilindini in April, May, and July 1916, but thereafter mostly called at ports in German East Africa: Dar es Salaam, Kilwa Kisiwani, and Lindi. She frequently called at Zanzibar.

From time to time Ebani sailed down the coast to South Africa. She called at Durban in May 1916, June 1916 and April 1917; and Cape Town in March 1917.

On 28 July 1917 the South Africa Medical Record published a complaint by medical officers serving in German East Africa, including Ebani's medical officer, Lieutenant-Colonel D Macaulay. They objected to the number of able-bodied men of military age in South Africa who had not volunteered for military service. As a result, Royal Army Medical Corps men were making up the shortfall in South African Army medical units.

In March 1918 Ebani called at Lagos in Nigeria, possibly on a trip to or from Britain. That year the East African Campaign moved south to Portuguese Mozambique. Ebani visited Port Amelia (now Pemba) at least seven times from April to November 1918, and also the Island of Mozambique that August. In just over four years as a hospital ship, Ebani carried more than 50,000 personnel and steamed 500,000 nautical miles (930,000 km).

=== Honours ===
In January 1919 Ebani's Master, Captain A Faill, was mentioned in dispatches. That June he was mentioned in dispatches again, along with his Chief Officer, A Downs, and Chief Engineer, W Lumsden.

== Peacetime decades ==
On 12 January 1919 the Admiralty returned Ebani to her owners. She was converted back into a cargo ship. By 1930 her wireless telegraph call sign was GRLC. By 1934 this had replaced her code letters. Also by 1934, her ownership had been transferred from BASN to Elder Dempster Lines.

== Maristella and Rio Atuel ==
On 30 November 1938 Fratelli Rituzzo ("Rituzzo Brothers") bought Ebani and her sister ship Eboe for £12,000 each. They were registered in Naples and renamed Maristella and Fortunstella respectively. Maristella's Italian call sign was IBGW.

In June 1940 Italy declared war on France and the UK. Both Maristella and Fortunstella took refuge in Argentina. In August 1941 the government of Argentina bought 16 Italian merchant ships, including both Maristella and Fortunstella, which it renamed Rio Atuel and Rio Tercero respectively. They were managed by the Flota Mercante del Estado ("State Merchant Fleet"); and registered in Buenos Aires. Rio Atuel's call sign was LOIO.

In 1946 Argentina returned Rio Atuel to Fratelli Rituzzo. On 3 August 1948 a drifting mine damaged her off the German island of Borkum, near the border with the Netherlands. She was not repaired. In June 1950 she arrived in Bruges in Belgium to be scrapped.

== Fate of sister ships ==
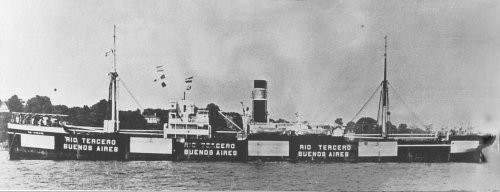
Rio Tercero, formerly Eboe

U-boats sank Eloby and Elele in 1917. A U-boat sank Rio Tercero (formerly Eboe) in 1942. Egba was renamed Empire Severn in 1943, and scuttled in 1946. Egori was sold and renamed Egorlock in 1939, renamed Inchona in 1947, and scrapped in 1951.

== Bibliography ==
- Beagle, Arthur (2001). Rutherford, Alan (ed.). Kaputala, The Diary of Arthur Beagle & The East Africa Campaign 1916–1918. Bishops Cleeve: Hand Over Fist Press. ISBN 978-0954051709.
- Fewster, Dan (1919). The Journals of Dan Fewster.
- Haws, Duncan (1990). Elder Dempster Lines. Merchant Fleets. Vol. 20. Hereford: Travel Creatours Ltd Publications. ISBN 0-946378-17-7.
- Lloyd's Register of Shipping. Vol. I.–Steamers. London: Lloyd's Register of Shipping. 1914 – via Internet Archive.
- Lloyd's Register of Shipping (PDF). Vol. I.–Steamers and Motorships of 300 tons gross and over. London: Lloyd's Register of Shipping. 1934 – via Southampton City Council.
- Lloyd's Register of Shipping (PDF). Vol. I.–Steamers and Motorships of 300 tons, trawlers, tugs, dredgers, &c. Sailing vessels. Shipowners, &c. London: Lloyd's Register of Shipping. 1939 – via Southampton City Council.
- Lloyd's Register of Shipping (PDF). Vol. II.–Steamers and Motorships of 300 tons gross and over. London: Lloyd's Register of Shipping. 1942 – via Southampton City Council.
- Macpherson, WG (1921). Official History of the Great War: Medical Services General History: Medical Services In The United Kingdom In British Garrisons Overseas And During Operations Against Tsingtau, In Togoland, The Cameroons, And South-West Africa. London: His Majesty's Stationery Office.
- Mercantile Navy List. London. 1930 – via Crew List Index Project.
