= SS Bozeman Victory =

Victory ship of the United States

- Typical Victory ship

History

United States
- Name: SS Bozeman Victory
- Namesake: Bozeman, Montana
- Owner: War Shipping Administration
- Operator: Alaska SS Company 1945
- Builder: Oregon Shipbuilding Company
- Laid down: November 3, 1944
- Launched: December 9, 1944
- Completed: February 17, 1945
- Fate: Sold to private 1946, scrapped 1972

General characteristics
- Class & type: VC2-S-AP3 Victory ship
- Tonnage: 7,612 GRT, 4,553 NRT
- Displacement: 15,200 tons
- Length: 455 ft (139 m)
- Beam: 62 ft (19 m)
- Draft: 28 ft (8.5 m)
- Installed power: 8,500 shp (6,300 kW)
- Propulsion: HP & LP turbines geared to a single 20.5-foot (6.2 m) propeller
- Speed: 16.5 knots (30.6 km/h; 19.0 mph)
- Boats & landing craft carried: 4 lifeboats
- Complement: 62 Merchant Marine and 28 US Naval Armed Guards
- Armament: 1 × 5-inch (127 mm)/38 caliber gun; 1 × 3-inch (76 mm)/50 caliber gun; 8 × 20 mm Oerlikon

SS Bozeman Victory was a Victory ship built during World War II under the Emergency Shipbuilding program. It was built and launched by the Oregon Shipbuilding Corporation on December 9, 1944, and completed on February 17, 1945. The ship's United States Maritime Commission designation was VC2-S-AP3 and hull number 151 (1205). She was built in just 106 days. The Maritime Commission turned it over for Merchant navy operation to a civilian contractor, the Alaska SS Company under the United States Merchant Marine act for the War Shipping Administration. She was named after the city of Bozeman, Montana.

Victory ships were designed to supersede the earlier Liberty ships. Unlike Liberty ships, Victory ships were designed to serve the US Navy after the war and also last longer. The Victory ship differed from a Liberty ship in that they were: faster, longer and wider, taller, and had a thinner stack set farther toward the superstructure. They also had a long raised forecastle.

== Christen ==
Bozeman, Montana City Commission and the War Committee of the Bozeman Chamber of Commerce asked Alice Dahl to christen the SS Bozeman Victory in Portland, Oregon. Alice had helped the war effort by selling bonds, working with the Red Cross and USO. Alice Dahl christened the Bozeman Victory in Portland on December 9, 1944. Alice Dahl was a gold star mom, a mom who had lost sons or daughters in military service during the war.

== World War II ==
Bozeman Victory served as an ammunition ship in the Pacific War. Bozeman Victory departed Mukilteo, Washington with ammunition to supply troops at Okinawa for the Battle of Okinawa. The Battle of Okinawa was 82 days, lasted from April 1 until June 22, 1945. On April 28, 1945, a Japanese assault demolition boat causes extensive damage to Bozeman Victory. US Navy gunboats were credited with keeping the ships at the bay off Okinawa safe. But a Japanese explosive speedboat slipped through. Bozeman Victory was hit at 2:10 am while at anchor. Bozeman Victory's hull plates were badly damaged near cargo hold #4. Six crew members were injured in the attack. Some of propeller shaft bearings were cracked in the hit, these immobilized the ship. This damage was bad, but none of the ships cargo, 6,000 tons of ammunition was damaged. The explosive speedboat may have been a kaiten, or a midget submarine.

On the same day kamikazes damaged four destroyers, Wadsworth, Daly, Twiggs and Bennion; also Bennion was damaged by aerial attack. Also on April 28, the hospital ships Pinkney and Comfort were hit by kamikazes.

Three Victory ammunition ships sank in action at Okinawa after kamikaze attacks: Canada Victory on April 27, 1945, Logan Victory on April 6, 1945, and Hobbs Victory on April 6, 1945. The loss of the three Victory ships severely hurt the combat forces. The three ships were carrying a total of 24,000 tons (54 million pounds) of ammunition; including most of the 81 mm mortar shells needed for the invasion of Okinawa.

The ammunition ship Saginaw Victory arrived April 12, 1945, at Okinawa to replace the ammunition lost on the three ships. Bozeman Victory and Saginaw Victory became the main ammunition ships in the Pacific War. More ammunition ships were not needed as the war came to an end without the invasion of Japan, called Operation Downfall. Forty-seven ships were sunk by kamikaze attack during World War II.

== Private use ==
In 1946 Bozeman Victory was sold to Compañía Argentina de Navegación Dodero, Buenos Aires, Argentina and renamed SS Campero. In 1949 she was sold to Flota Argentina de Navegación de Ultramar, Buenos Aires. In 1961 she was sold to Empresa Líneas Marítimas Argentinas, Buenos Aires. In 1972 she was scrapped at Campana, Argentina.

== See also ==
- List of Victory ships
- SS William and Mary Victory also sold to Compana Argentina de Nav. Dodero
- Liberty ship
- Type C1 ship
- Type C2 ship
- Type C3 ship

== Sources ==
- Sawyer, L.A. and W.H. Mitchell. Victory ships and tankers: The history of the ‘Victory type" cargo ships and of the tankers built in the United States of America during World War II, Cornell Maritime Press, 1974, 0-87033-182-5.
- United States Maritime Commission:
- Victory Cargo Ships
