= ARA Comodoro Rivadavia =

At least two ships of the Argentine Navy have been named ARA Comodoro Rivadavia:

- ARA Comodoro Rivadavia (1937), a survey vessel commissioned in 1928 as San Juan she was renamed Comodoro Riavdavia in 1937 and Madryn in 1942. She was sold in 1967.
- ARA Comodoro Rivadavia (Q-11), a survey ship commissioned in 1974.

Argentina also operated in a State owned shipping line:

- SS Comodoro Rivadavia (1922), previously the mercantile Anselm in service from 1942 to 1944.

In addition at least two ships have been named ARA Rivadavia :

- ARA Rivadavia (1902), a Rivadavia-class cruiser ordered from Italy and given the temporary name of San Mitra, renamed Rivadavia on launching in 1902. Sold to Japan and renamed Kasuga before completion in 1903. She was sunk in 1945.
- ARA Rivadavia (1911), a Rivadavia-class battleship launched in 1911 and scrapped in 1957.
