= SS Gustavus Victory =

World War II Victory ship

- Launching of the SS Gustavus Victory

History

United States
- Name: SS Gustavus Victory
- Namesake: Gustavus Adolphus College
- Builder: Bethlehem-Fairfield Shipyard, Inc.
- Laid down: May 25, 1945
- Launched: July 9, 1945
- Sponsored by: Marion Logan
- Decommissioned: 1947
- Renamed: Santa Fe, 1947
- Fate: Scrapped, 1974 in Argentina

General characteristics
- Class & type: VC2-S-AP2 Victory Ship
- Tonnage: 10,700 tons
- Length: 456 ft (139 m)
- Beam: 63 ft (19 m)
- Speed: 15 knots (28 km/h; 17 mph)
- Complement: 62

SS Gustavus Victory was constructed in Bethlehem-Fairfield Shipyard in Baltimore, Maryland. The 75th Victory ship, it was named for Gustavus Adolphus College in Saint Peter, Minnesota, which was named for the 17th century King of Sweden Gustav II Adolf. The college made a gift towards furnishing a ship library, which comprised two 40-book units and was managed by the American Merchant Marine Library Association.

== History ==
Gustavus alumna of 1924, Marion Logan of New York, sponsored the ship. Marion was the wife of Rufus T. Logan, Captain in the Army Air Force, and daughter of former Gustavus professor Dr. John A. Youngquist.

Construction of the vessel took 38 days, and it was launched from the shipyard on July 9, 1945, at 4 p.m. Gustavus Victory was boarded and operated by A. L. Burbank & Company, Ltd, including Captain J. M. Delhome and Chief Engineer Albert L. Hayes. It was converted to a troopship for returning European veterans at the end of World War II before being transferred to the Pacific theater of war. The ship had a carrying capacity of 750 passengers with an 85-person crew. During its career, crew members produced a ship publication titled Atlantic agony: the Landlubber's journal.

=== Postwar ===
Gustavus Victory was sold after World War II and renamed Santa Fe (ELMA). The ship was converted to an emigrant ship to transport European emigrants to Argentina. The Santa Fe sailed as part of the Compañía Argentina de Navegación Alberto Dodero.

== See also ==
- SS Waterville Victory sister ship
- SS Smith Victory sister ship
- List of Victory ships
- Liberty ship
- Type C1 ship
- Type C2 ship
- Type C3 ship
