= SS Smith Victory (1945) =

United States Merchant Marine ship

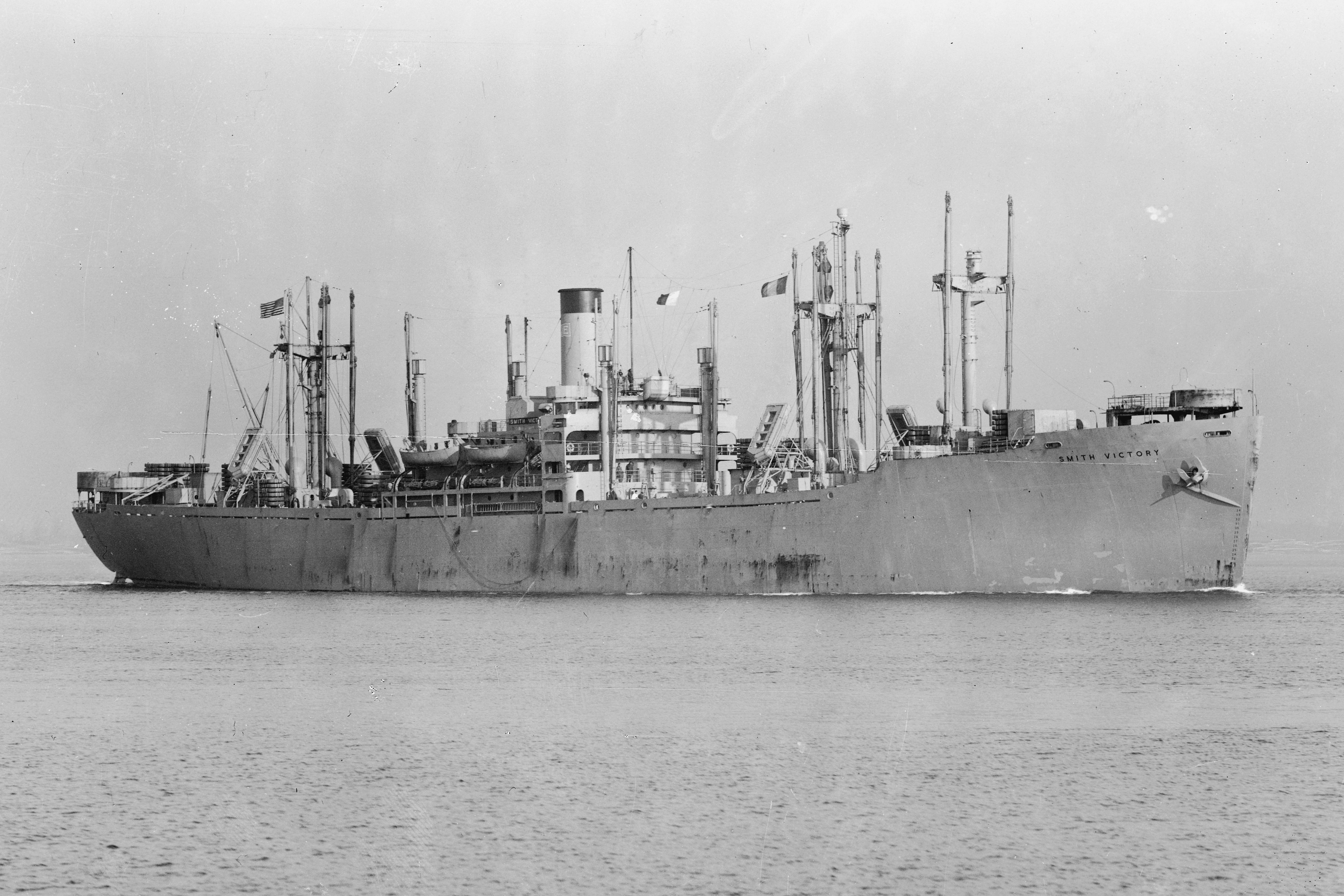
- Smith Victory on the river Scheldt

History

United States
- Name: Smith Victory
- Namesake: Smith College
- Ordered: as type (VC2-S-AP2) hull, MCV hull 824
- Builder: Bethlehem-Fairfield Shipyard, Inc., Baltimore, Maryland
- Yard number: 2477
- Laid down: 11 April 1945
- Launched: 24 May 1945
- Sponsored by: Elizabeth Cutter Morrow
- Completed: 22 June 1945
- Fate: Wrecked and scrapped 1968 in Bilbao, Spain

General characteristics
- Class & type: Boulder Victory-class cargo ship
- Displacement: 4,480 long tons (4,550 t) (standard); 15,580 long tons (15,830 t) (full load)
- Length: 455 ft (139 m)
- Beam: 62 ft (19 m)
- Draft: 29 ft 2 in (8.89 m)
- Installed power: 8,500 shp (6,300 kW)
- Propulsion: 1 × cross compound steam turbine; 1 × shaft
- Speed: 15.5 kn (17.8 mph; 28.7 km/h)
- Complement: 49 officers and enlisted
- Armament: none

SS Smith Victory was a Victory ship cargo ship built for the U.S. Maritime Commission during the final months of World War II. She was converted to be a troop ship.

== Victory built in Maryland ==
Smith Victory under Maritime Commission contract by Bethlehem Fairfield Shipyard, Inc., Baltimore, Maryland; laid down on 11 April 1945, launched on 24 May 1945, sponsored by Elizabeth Cutter Morrow of Smith College, christened on May 24, 1945, completed=22 June 1945 and delivered to her operator, Eastern SS Company. Smith Victory is named after Smith College, a private liberal arts women's college in Northampton, Massachusetts. It was chartered in 1871 by Sophia Smith and opened in 1875.

== Service ==
SS Smith Victory was christened on May 24, 1945, by Elizabeth Cutter Morrow, before sliding into the Patapsco River near Baltimore, Maryland. Smith Victory was named after Smith College. The Smith Victory was built by the Bethlehem-Fairfield Shipyard. The Bethlehem-Fairfield Shipyard employed 47,000 people. Smith Victory could carry 10,800 tons of supplies or 1,500 troops at a top speed of 15 knots. Smith Victory was converted to a troopship and used to bring troops home as part of Operation Magic Carpet. Smith Victory was operated by (Eastern SS Company. The ship ran a daily newsletter called the Sea Breeze to entertain the troops on the trip. The Smith Victory returned about 7,000 troops. In 1946 she was laid up in the Hudson River Reserve Fleet. In 1947 Smith Victory was sold to Compana Argentina de Nav. Dodero in Buenos Aires, Argentina and renamed the SS Buenos Aires. Passenger living space was added to the ship. She served as a both a cargo and passenger ship until 1968. In 1961 she was sold to the Empresa Lineas Maritimas Argentinas in Buenos Aires. In 1963 she was sold to Southwind Shipping Corporation of Liberia and renamed SS Fairwind. On February 11, 1968, she ran aground on the Grand Bahama Banks, near Andros Island. She was a total loss and was towed to Bilbao, Spain, where she arrived July 6, 1968 to be scrapped.

== See also ==
- SS Waterville Victory
- SS Gustavus Victory
- List of Victory ships
- Liberty ship
- Type C1 ship
- Type C2 ship
- Type C3 ship
