= SS Anselm (1905) =

History
- Name: 1905: Anselm; 1922: Comodoro Rivadavia; 1942: Rio Santa Cruz
- Namesake: 1905: Anselm of Canterbury; 1922: Comodoro Rivadavia; 1944: Santa Cruz River
- Owner: 1905: Booth Steam Ship Co; 1922: Argentina Cia General de Nav SA; 1937: Argentina Nueva Cia Gen de Nav SA; 1942: Government of Argentina
- Operator: 1905: Booth Steam Ship Co; 1922: AM Delfino y Compañia; 1944: Flota Mercante del Estado
- Port of registry: 1905: (United Kingdom) Liverpool; 1922: (Argentina) Buenos Aires
- Builder: Workman, Clark and Company, Belfast
- Cost: £89,000
- Yard number: 214
- Launched: 10 January 1905
- Completed: March 1905
- Maiden voyage: 29 March 1905
- Identification: 1905–22: UK official number 120834; 1905–22: code letters HCFR; by 1911: call sign MDK; 1922–33: code letters HBJP; 1934–59: call sign LOFL
- Fate: boiler explosion 1952; scrapped 1959

General characteristics
- Type: cargo and passenger liner
- Tonnage: 1905: 5,442 GRT, 3,139 NRT; 1930: 5,450 GRT, 3,139 NRT
- Length: 400.4 ft (122.0 m)
- Beam: 50.1 ft (15.3 m)
- Depth: 19.1 ft (5.8 m)
- Installed power: 819 nhp
- Propulsion: 4 cylindrical boilers; 1 vertical triple-expansion engine; 1 screw
- Capacity: passengers: 149 first class; 200 steerage class

Anselm was a cargo and passenger steamship built by Workman, Clark and Company in Belfast for the Booth Line service between Liverpool and the Amazon ports in Brazil. It was the second of four Booth Line ships to be named after Saint Anselm.

In 1922 an Argentinian shipping company bought Anselm and renamed it Comodoro Rivadavia. In 1942 the Argentinian government bought it and renamed it Rio Santa Cruz. It suffered a boiler explosion in 1952 and was scrapped in 1959.

== Building ==
Anselm was designed as a larger version of Booth's 1903-built Ambrose. She had a length overall of 400.4 ft (122.0 m), a beam of 50.1 ft (15.3 m), and a depth of 19.1 ft (5.8 m). Her tonnages were initially 5,442 GRT and 3,139 NRT.

The ship had one propeller powered by a vertical triple-expansion steam engine made by the shipbuilders, rated at 819 nhp or 4,500 ihp (3,400 kW) and supplied by four coal-fired cylindrical boilers, giving her a service speed of 12 knots (22 km/h). Ambrose had berths for 149 passengers in first class and 200 in steerage as originally built.

Workman, Clark and Company built Anselm in Belfast as yard number 214 for the Booth Steamship Company of Liverpool for £89,000. She was launched on 10 January 1905, delivered on 20 March and registered at Liverpool with the UK official number 120834 and code letters HCFR

== Booth Line service ==
Anselm served Booth's main route between Liverpool and the Brazilian Amazon ports of Para (Belém) and Manaus in the Amazon rubber boom. (Note: At the time, the modern port city of Belém was referred to in English as "Para", the same as the name of the Brazilian state, and Manaus was spelled "Manaos") Her maiden voyage, from Liverpool to Manaus, with calls at Le Havre, Lisbon, Funchal and Belém, began on 29 March 1905. On a later voyage, inbound to Manaus from Madeira, Anselm collided in the River Amazon with her running mate, Booth Line's Cyril, on 5 September 1905. (Note: Sources differ on the location of the collision. Most contemporary reports place the collision near "Carnation" or "Carnaticu" Island, 4 miles (6.4 km) below Curralinho, Marajó, which is about 80 miles (130 km) above Belém; others say about 30 miles (48 km) below Belém;) The latter was outbound with a valuable cargo of rubber and due to complete loading at Belém. After the collision, Anselm put back to Belém for repairs to her bow and stem.

On a claim by some owners of Cyril's rubber cargo in the Admiralty Court, it was held that, although both ships had failed to comply with the Collision Regulations, Anselm's failure had not caused the collision, and the Cyril was solely to blame. The Court of Appeal overturned that judgement and held that both vessels were at fault.

Less than three months after the collision, Anselm ran aground in the Amazon 50 miles (80 km) above Belém on about 27 November. She was later refloated by the Liverpool Salvage Association's salvage steamer Ranger, which had just completed the successful recovery of most of the Cyril's cargo of rubber.

By 1911 Anselm was equipped for wireless telegraphy, operating on the 300 and 600 metre wavelengths. Her call sign was MDK.

In the First World War Anselm was chartered as a troop ship for a number of voyages to France in 1914–15 before returning to her regular liner service. She survived the war, and in 1918 was transferred to Booth Line's service between New York and the Amazon. In 1922, with the fleet being reduced following the end of the rubber boom, Anselm was sold to an Argentinian shipping company.

== Argentinian service ==
In 1922 Argentina Compañía General de Navegación SA (ACGN) bought Anselm and renamed her Comodoro Rivadavia, after Patagonia's main port. She was re-registered in Buenos Aires and her code letters were changed to HBJP. By 1930 her gross register tonnage had been revised to 5,450.

ACGN had been founded in 1920 to replace the former Linea Nacional del Sud, an operation of the German shipping line Hamburg Südamerikanische Dampfschifffahrts-Gesellschaft serving Argentinian domestic routes between Buenos Aires and Patagonia with their own ships under Argentinian flag. Stronger cabotage restrictions introduced in the First World War made it expedient to establish a more clearly Argentinian-owned company. Hamburg Süd's long-serving and loyal principal agent in Argentina, Antonio M Delfino, and his family provided 45 per cent of the capital for ACGN, the German company provided another 45 per cent through a group led by lawyer Ernesto Aguirre, and the remaining 10 per cent was held by independent shareholders. In addition the management of the fleet was entrusted to Delfino's agency company, A M Delfino y Compañia.

In 1923 Comodoro Rivadavia was put into service mainly on the Buenos Aires – Comodoro Rivadavia route alongside the passenger-cargo liner Buenos Aires (formerly Hamburg Süd's Camarones ex-Taquary), and replacing the same owner's Presidente Mitre ex-Argentina, which was sold to Chilean buyers. On 6 May 1931 the ship stranded in the Second Narrows, Straits of Magellan, but was successfully refloated two days later by the Chilean Navy.

In 1934 Comodoro Rivadavia's code letters were superseded by the call sign LOFL.

In the decline in the Patagonian trade in the 1930s the main passenger route was reduced to a one-ship service, with first the Buenos Aires and then the Comodoro Rivadavia being withdrawn, with maintenance and painting being carried out during lay-up. In 1937, with continuing poor financial results, Hamburg Süd decided to withdraw and the ACGN company was liquidated, selling its assets to the newly-formed Argentina Nueva Compañía General de Navegación SA (ANCGN), which was wholly owned by the Delfino company.

Early in the Second World War the Delfino company, with its close involvement with Hamburg Süd, was blacklisted by the Allies, with the danger that its ships could be captured at sea by Allied naval forces; Comodoro Rivadavia was therefore laid up in Buenos Aires. In 1941, faced by a desperate need to resume sea transport both domestically and internationally, the Government of Argentina established Flota Mercante del Estado ("state merchant fleet"), to operate many ships of the belligerents interned in Argentina, as well as ANCGN's ships, which were transferred in March 1942. In 1944 she was renamed Rio Santa Cruz, and later reduced to cargo-only service

== Explosion and disposal ==
At around 7am on 7 May 1952, en route from Puerto San Julián to Buenos Aires, Rio Santa Cruz suffered a major boiler explosion off Cabo Blanco, between Puerto Deseado and Comodoro Rivadavia, just as a storm was approaching. Six members of her engine room crew were killed when the casing of one boiler split, spreading 12 tons of boiling water in the boiler room and disabling the engine and generators. Nearby ships responded to an SOS call, but securing a tow-line was difficult in the storm conditions. After three days it was decided that the six dead crewmen would be buried at sea. The ship was later towed to port and withdrawn from service. In 1957 she was sold for demolition and broken up at Rio de Janeiro in 1959.
