= German submarine U-202 =

German World War II submarine

Coordinates: 56°12′N 39°52′W

History

Nazi Germany
- Name: U-202
- Ordered: 23 September 1939
- Builder: Germaniawerft, Kiel
- Yard number: 631
- Laid down: 18 March 1940
- Launched: 10 February 1941
- Commissioned: 22 March 1941
- Fate: Sunk, 2 June 1943

General characteristics
- Class & type: Type VIIC submarine
- Displacement: 769 tonnes (757 long tons) surfaced; 871 t (857 long tons) submerged
- Length: 67.10 m (220 ft 2 in) o/a; 50.50 m (165 ft 8 in) pressure hull
- Beam: 6.20 m (20 ft 4 in) o/a; 4.70 m (15 ft 5 in) pressure hull
- Height: 9.60 m (31 ft 6 in)
- Draught: 4.74 m (15 ft 7 in)
- Installed power: 2,800–3,200 PS (2,100–2,400 kW; 2,800–3,200 bhp) (diesels); 750 PS (550 kW; 740 shp) (electric)
- Propulsion: 2 shafts; 2 × diesel engines; 2 × electric motors
- Speed: 17.7 knots (32.8 km/h; 20.4 mph) surfaced; 7.6 knots (14.1 km/h; 8.7 mph) submerged
- Range: 8,500 nmi (15,700 km; 9,800 mi) at 10 knots (19 km/h; 12 mph) surfaced; 80 nmi (150 km; 92 mi) at 4 knots (7.4 km/h; 4.6 mph) submerged
- Test depth: 230 m (750 ft); Crush depth: 250–295 m (820–968 ft)
- Complement: 4 officers, 40–56 enlisted
- Armament: 5 × 53.3 cm (21 in) torpedo tubes (four bow, one stern); 14 × G7e torpedoes or 26 TMA mines; 1 × 8.8 cm (3.46 in) deck gun (220 rounds); 1 x 2 cm (0.79 in) C/30 AA gun

Service record
- Part of: 1st U-boat Flotilla; 22 March 1941 – 2 June 1943
- Identification codes: M 38 859
- Commanders: Kptlt. Hans-Heinz Linder; 22 March 1941 – 1 September 1942; Oblt.z.S. / Kptlt. Günter Poser; 2 September 1942 – 2 June 1943
- Operations: 9 patrols: 1st patrol: 17 June – 23 July 1941; 2nd patrol: 11 August – 17 September 1941; 3rd patrol: 16 October – 13 November 1941; 4th patrol: 13 – 27 December 1941; 5th patrol: 1 March – 26 April 1942; 6th patrol: 27 Mary – 25 July 1942; 7th patrol: 6 September – 25 October 1942; 8th patrol: 12 January – 26 March 1942; 9th patrol: 29 April – 2 June 1943
- Victories: 9 merchant ships sunk (34,615 GRT); 4 merchant ships damaged (35,427 GRT)

German submarine U-202 was a Type VIIC U-boat of the Kriegsmarine during World War II. The submarine was laid down on 18 March 1940 by the Friedrich Krupp Germaniawerft yard at Kiel as yard number 631, launched on 10 February 1941, and commissioned on 22 March under the command of Kapitänleutnant Hans-Heinz Linder.

She sank nine ships totalling 34,615 gross register tons (GRT) and damaged four more totalling 35,427 GRT.

She was sunk on 2 June 1943 in the North Atlantic by depth charges and gunfire from British warships after a lengthy series of depth charge attacks. 18 men died, there were 30 survivors.

== Design ==
German Type VIIC submarines were preceded by the shorter Type VIIB submarines. U-202 had a displacement of 769 tonnes (757 long tons) when at the surface and 871 tonnes (857 long tons) while submerged. She had a total length of 67.10 m (220 ft 2 in), a pressure hull length of 50.50 m (165 ft 8 in), a beam of 6.20 m (20 ft 4 in), a height of 9.60 m (31 ft 6 in), and a draught of 4.74 m (15 ft 7 in). The submarine was powered by two Germaniawerft F46 four-stroke, six-cylinder supercharged diesel engines producing a total of 2,800 to 3,200 metric horsepower (2,060 to 2,350 kW; 2,760 to 3,160 shp) for use while surfaced, two AEG GU 460/8–27 double-acting electric motors producing a total of 750 metric horsepower (550 kW; 740 shp) for use while submerged. She had two shafts and two 1.23 m (4 ft) propellers. The boat was capable of operating at depths of up to 230 metres (750 ft).

The submarine had a maximum surface speed of 17.7 knots (32.8 km/h; 20.4 mph) and a maximum submerged speed of 7.6 knots (14.1 km/h; 8.7 mph). When submerged, the boat could operate for 80 nautical miles (150 km; 92 mi) at 4 knots (7.4 km/h; 4.6 mph); when surfaced, she could travel 8,500 nautical miles (15,700 km; 9,800 mi) at 10 knots (19 km/h; 12 mph). U-202 was fitted with five 53.3 cm (21 in) torpedo tubes (four fitted at the bow and one at the stern), fourteen torpedoes, one 8.8 cm (3.46 in) SK C/35 naval gun, 220 rounds, and a 2 cm (0.79 in) C/30 anti-aircraft gun. The boat had a complement of between forty-four and sixty.

== Service history ==
Part of the 1st U-boat Flotilla, U-202 conducted nine patrols in the North Atlantic, the last three under the command of Kptlt. Günter Poser; she was a member of ten wolfpacks.

=== First, second and third patrols ===
U-202's first patrol began when she left Kiel on 17 June 1941; it passed without incident and concluded with her entry into Brest in France on 23 July after 37 days at sea.

She had more success on her second outing; departing Brest on 11 August, attacking and sinking two ships east of Greenland and south of Iceland before returning to Brest on 17 September 1941.

Her third patrol, beginning on 16 October, which was also successful, saw the destruction of the British-registered Flynderborg and Gretavale northeast of Newfoundland. She returned to her French base on 13 November, after a voyage of 29 days.

=== Fourth, fifth and sixth patrols ===
The submarine's fourth patrol was towards the Moroccan coast. U-202 left Brest on 13 December 1941. She returned empty-handed on 27 December.

Her fifth patrol produced better results, damaging the British ships Athelviscount about 600 nmi (1,100 km; 690 mi) east southeast of Halifax on 22 March 1942 and sinking Loch Don about 500 nmi (930 km; 580 mi) north northeast of Bermuda on 1 April. This patrol was from 1 March to 26 April, a total of 57 days.

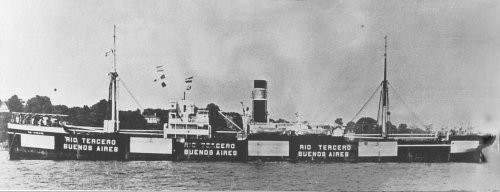
Argentine merchant ship Rio Tercero, sunk by U-202

Her sixth patrol, commencing on 27 May, was also successful. On 12 June she landed four saboteurs at Amagansett, New York, on Long Island, as part of Operation Pastorius. On 22 June she sank the Argentinian Rio Tercero about 120 nmi (220 km; 140 mi) off New York, followed by the US ship City of Birmingham about 250 nmi (460 km; 290 mi) east of Cape Hatteras, North Carolina on 1 July. U-202 reached Brest on 25 July, after 60 days.

=== Seventh, eighth and ninth patrols ===
The boat's seventh patrol took in the northern coast of South America, leaving Brest on 6 September 1942. British aircraft attacked U-202 on 8 September while still in the Bay of Biscay, and again on 29 September southeast of Trinidad. Although damaged, the U-boat continued her patrol, sinking two ships before returning to base on 25 October.

She sank one ship and damaged three others after commencing her eighth patrol on 12 January 1943. She was attacked south of the Azores on 23 February. U-202 returned to Brest on 26 March after 74 days away.

Her ninth and final patrol began on 29 April 1943 and came to an end when she was sunk on 2 June 1943.

=== Wolfpacks ===
U-202 took part in ten wolfpacks, namely:

- Grönland (17 – 27 August 1941)
- Markgraf (27 August – 11 September 1941)
- Schlagetot (20 October – 1 November 1941)
- Raubritter (1 – 5 November 1941)
- Delphin (20 January – 9 February 1943)
- Rochen (9 – 28 February 1943)
- Tümmler (1 – 19 March 1943)
- Without name (5 – 10 May 1943)
- Lech (10 – 15 May 1943)
- Donau 2 (15 – 26 May 1943)

== Sinking ==
'HF/DF' (radio detection equipment) of ships in the Second Support Group, (headed by the British sloop HMS Starling commanded by Captain FJ Walker, RN), detected U-202 when she transmitted a daily report at 9:30 am on the 1 June 1943. On closing the range, Starling's lookout spotted the swirl of water where U-202 had just crash dived after identifying the approaching vessels as warships. Five minutes later, the U-boat was detected with ASDIC (sonar) and attacked with depth charges. Despite much evasive action and the use of submarine bubble targets (Note: Submarine Bubble Targets (SBT) were developed by the Kriegsmarine in 1941. Tubes of chemicals were ejected from the U-boat to produce mats of bubbles underwater. These could appear to be a submarine to an ASDIC operator, so causing an anti-submarine warship to lose its target.) to confuse the British sonar, the submarine failed to shake off her pursuers.

The six British warships eventually adopted the tactic of keeping the U-boat moving, so as to use up her reserves of battery power. The expectation was that the U-boat would surface after dark and try to escape at speed on the surface. U-202 surfaced just after midnight, and the guns of the escort group immediately engaged her. Starling closed to ram her, but Walker decided at the last moment that the U-boat was already beaten. He turned Starling aside, firing depth charges at a shallow setting from the port thrower as she passed by. The damaged U-boat took 40 minutes to sink.

It was a textbook attack that pleased Walker enough to signal 'splice the mainbrace' (issue rum) in celebration.

== Summary of raiding history ==
Date	Ship Name	Nationality	Tonnage (GRT)	Fate
27 August 1941	Ladylove	United Kingdom	230	Sunk
11 September 1941	Scania	Sweden	1,999	Sunk
3 November 1941	Flynderborg	United Kingdom	2,022	Sunk
3 November 1941	Gretavale	United Kingdom	4,586	Sunk
22 March 1942	Athelviscount	United Kingdom	8,882	Damaged
1 April 1942	Loch Don	United Kingdom	5,249	Sunk
22 June 1942	Rio Tercero	Argentina	4,864	Sunk
1 July 1942	City of Birmingham	United States	5,861	Sunk
1 October 1942	Achilles	Netherlands	1,815	Sunk
23 February 1943	British Fortitude	United Kingdom	8,482	Damaged
23 February 1943	Empire Norseman	United Kingdom	9,811	Damaged
23 February 1943	Esso Baton Rouge	United States	7,989	Sunk
23 February 1943	Murena	Netherlands	8,252	Damaged

== Portrayal in media ==
At least three books have been written about the 1942 raid, the 1959 book Eight Spies against America by John Dasch, the 1961 book They Came to Kill by Eugene Rachlis, and the 2004 book "Saboteurs:The Nazi Raid on America," by Michael Dobbs.

== Bibliography ==
- Burn, Alan (1993). The Fighting Captain: Frederic John Walker RN and the Battle of the Atlantic (Kindle, 2006 ed.). Barnsley: Pen and Sword. ISBN 978-1-84415-439-5.
- Busch, Rainer; Röll, Hans-Joachim (1999). German U-boat commanders of World War II : a biographical dictionary. Translated by Brooks, Geoffrey. London, Annapolis, Md: Greenhill Books, Naval Institute Press. ISBN 1-55750-186-6.
- Busch, Rainer; Röll, Hans-Joachim (1999). Deutsche U-Boot-Verluste von September 1939 bis Mai 1945 [German U-boat losses from September 1939 to May 1945]. Der U-Boot-Krieg (in German). Vol. IV. Hamburg, Berlin, Bonn: Mittler. ISBN 3-8132-0514-2.
- Gröner, Erich; Jung, Dieter; Maass, Martin (1991). U-boats and Mine Warfare Vessels. German Warships 1815–1945. Vol. 2. Translated by Thomas, Keith; Magowan, Rachel. London: Conway Maritime Press. ISBN 0-85177-593-4.
- Kemp, Paul (1999). U-Boats Destroyed - German Submarine Losses in the World Wars. London: Arms & Armour. ISBN 1-85409-515-3.
