= SS Rio Tercero =

Cargo steamship that was sunk in WW2

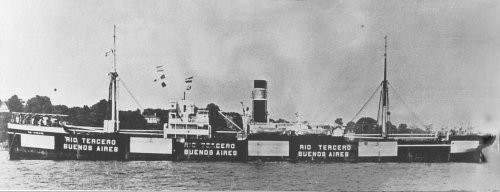
- the ship as Rio Tercero

History
- Name: 1912: Eboe; 1938: Fortunstella; 1941: Rio Tercero
- Namesake: 1938: "Star of Fortune"; 1941: Tercero River
- Owner: 1912: African SS Co; 1934: Elder Dempster Lines; 1938: Fratelli Rituzzo; 1941: Government of Argentina
- Operator: 1912: Elder, Dempster & Co; 1941: Flota Mercante del Estado
- Port of registry: 1912: (United Kingdom) Liverpool; 1938: (Kingdom of Italy) Genoa; 1941: (Argentina) Buenos Aires
- Builder: Palmers S&I Co, Hebburn
- Yard number: 821
- Launched: 25 September 1912
- Completed: December 1912
- Identification: UK official number 135174; until 1933: code letters JBKD; from 1930: call sign GQCR; from 1938: call sign IBHM; from 1941: call sign LOII
- Fate: Sunk by torpedo, 1942

General characteristics
- Type: cargo ship
- Tonnage: 4,866 GRT, 2,965 NRT
- Length: 405.1 ft (123.5 m)
- Beam: 54.1 ft (16.5 m)
- Depth: 23.5 ft (7.2 m)
- Decks: 2
- Installed power: 566 NHP
- Propulsion: 1 × triple-expansion engine; 1 × screw
- Speed: 11 knots (20 km/h)
- Crew: 43
- Notes: sister ships: Ebani, Eloby, Elele, Egba, Egori

SS Rio Tercero was a cargo steamship that was launched in England in 1912 as Eboe. She was renamed Fortunstella in 1938, and Rio Tercero in 1941. A U-boat sank her in the Battle of the Atlantic in 1942.

She was built for the African Steam Ship Company, which was part of Elder, Dempster & Co. Italian owners bought her in 1938. Argentina laid her up in 1940, and took her over in 1941. She was in Argentinian service when she was sunk.

She was the fourth of five Elder, Dempster ships that were called Eboe. The first three were 19th-century steamships. The fifth was a motor ship that was launched in 1952, and sold and renamed in 1977.

== Building ==
Between 1912 and 1914 Elder, Dempster took delivery of a class of six cargo steamships, built by three British shipbuilders. Palmers Shipbuilding and Iron Company at Hebburn on the River Tyne launched Ebani and Eboe in 1912. Irvine's Shipbuilding and Dry Dock Company in West Hartlepool on the River Tees launched Eloby in 1912 and Elele in 1913. Harland & Wolff in Govan on the River Clyde launched Egba in 1913 and Egori in 1914.

Palmer's built Eboe as yard number 821. She was launched on 25 September 1912 and completed that December. Her registered length was 405.1 ft (123.5 m), her beam was 54.0 ft (16.5 m), and her depth was 23.5 ft (7.2 m). She had berths for 12 passengers, and carried a crew of 40. Her tonnages were 4,866 GRT and 2,965 NRT.

Eboe had a single screw, driven by a three-cylinder triple-expansion engine of Palmer's own manufacture. It was rated at 566 NHP, and gave her a speed of 11 knots (20 km/h).

== Eboe ==
The African SS Co registered Eboe at Liverpool. Her United Kingdom official number was 135174, and her code letters were JBKD. On 7 April 1918 U-155 shelled Eboe off Sierra Leone. By 1930 her wireless telegraph call sign was GQCR. By 1934 this had replaced her code letters. Also by 1934, her ownership had been transferred from BASN to Elder Dempster Lines.

== Fortunstella and Rio Tercero ==
On 30 November 1938 Fratelli Rituzzo ("Rituzzo Brothers") bought Eboe and her sister ship Ebani for £12,000 each. They were registered in Naples and renamed Fortunstella and Maristella respectively. Fortunstella's Italian call sign was IBHM.

In June 1940 Italy declared war on France and the UK. Both Fortunstella and Maristella took refuge in Argentina. Fortunstella was in port at Necochea. On 25 August 1941 the government of Argentina bought 16 Italian merchant ships, including both Fortunstella and Maristella, which it renamed Rio Tercero and Rio Atuel respectively. They were managed by the Flota Mercante del Estado ("State Merchant Fleet"); and registered in Buenos Aires. Rio Tercero's call sign was LOII.

== Loss ==
In June 1942 Rio Tercero left New York for Buenos Aires, carrying 3,500 tons of general cargo, including coal and mail. She sailed unescorted, as Argentina was neutral at the time. At 12:34 hrs on 22 June, U-202 fired a spread of three torpedoes at her, one of which hit her starboard side. The torpedo caused one of her boilers to explode, killing five of her crew. Rio Tercero sent an SOS message and sank slowly, about 120 nautical miles (220 km) off New York at position 39°15′N 72°32′W.

U-202's commander, Kapitänleutnant Hans-Heinz Linder, claimed that the ship displayed no neutrality markings, and he did not know she was Argentinian until he questioned the survivors afterward. US aircraft attacked U-202, forcing her to dive. The submarine chaser USS SC-503 rescued survivors.

== Bibliography ==
- Haws, Duncan (1990). Elder Dempster Lines. Merchant Fleets. Vol. 20. Hereford: Travel Creatours Ltd Publications. ISBN 0-946378-17-7.
- Hickam, Homer H (1989). Torpedo Junction: U-boat war off America's east coast, 1942. New York: Dell Publishing. ISBN 0-440-21027-5.
- Lloyd's Register of Shipping. Vol. I.–Steamers. London: Lloyd's Register of Shipping. 1914 – via Internet Archive.
- Lloyd's Register of Shipping (PDF). Vol. I.–Steamers and Motorships of 300 tons gross and over. London: Lloyd's Register of Shipping. 1934 – via Southampton City Council.
- Lloyd's Register of Shipping (PDF). Vol. I.–Steamers and Motorships of 300 tons, trawlers, tugs, dredgers, &c. Sailing vessels. Shipowners, &c. London: Lloyd's Register of Shipping. 1939 – via Southampton City Council.
- Lloyd's Register of Shipping (PDF). Vol. II.–Steamers and Motorships of 300 tons gross and over. London: Lloyd's Register of Shipping. 1942 – via Southampton City Council.
- Mercantile Navy List. London. 1930 – via Crew List Index Project.
