= SS Claremont Victory =

Victory ship of the United States

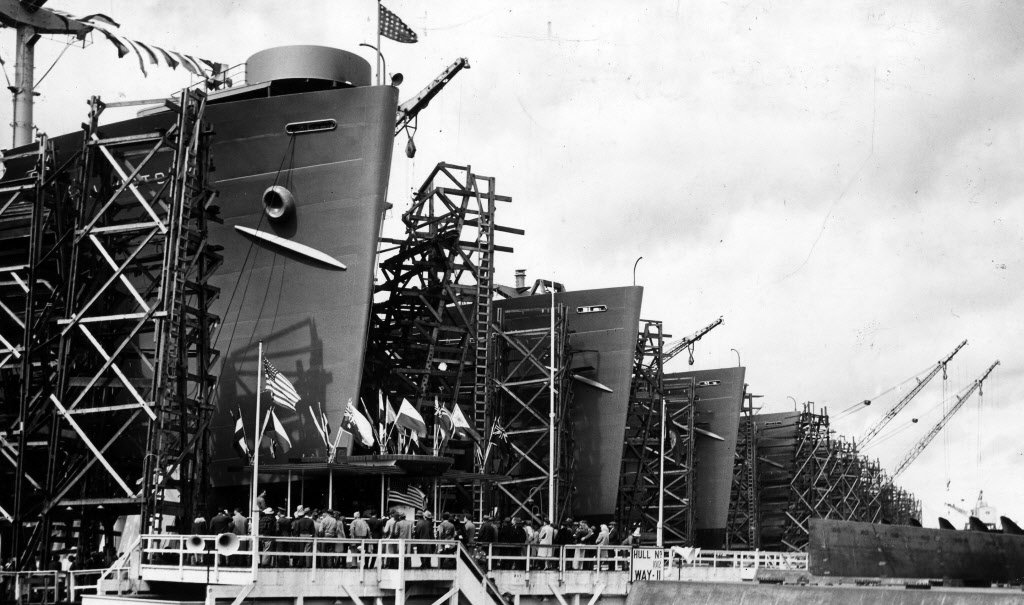
- Oregon Shipbuilding Corporation, SS Claremont Victory with her sister ships 1944

History

United States
- Name: SS Claremont Victory
- Owner: War Shipping Administration
- Operator: Isthmian Steamship Company
- Builder: Oregon Shipbuilding Company Portland
- Laid down: March 5, 1944
- Launched: May 2, 1944
- Completed: May 23, 1944
- Fate: Sold 1946

History

Argentina
- Name: SS Hornero 1946
- Owner: Compania Argentina De Navigacion Dodera
- Operator: Compania Argentina De Navigacion Dodera S.A, Buenos
- Fate: Scrapped 1978 in Campana, Argentina

General characteristics
- Class & type: VC2-S-AP3 Victory ship
- Tonnage: 7612 GRT, 4,553 NRT
- Displacement: 15,200 tons
- Length: 455 ft (139 m)
- Beam: 62 ft (19 m)
- Draught: 28 ft (8.5 m)
- Installed power: 8,500 shp (6,300 kW)
- Propulsion: HP & LP turbines geared to a single 20.5-foot (6.2 m) propeller
- Speed: 16.5 knots
- Boats & landing craft carried: 4 Lifeboats
- Complement: 62 Merchant Marine and 28 US Naval Armed Guards, as Victory Ship
- Armament: 1 × 5 inch (127 mm)/38 caliber gun; 1 × 3 inch (76 mm)/50 caliber gun; 8 × 20 mm Oerlikon

The SS Claremont Victory was the 18th of 531 Victory ships built during World War II. She was built in the Oregon Shipbuilding Corporation shipyard in 1944. She served during the Battle of Okinawa. After the war, she was owned by a number of merchant shipping companies in Argentina before being scrapped in 1978.

The Victory ships were designed to replace the earlier Liberty Ships that were designed to be used exclusively for WW2. Victory ships were designed to last longer and serve the US Navy after the war as these were faster, longer, wider, taller, had a thinner stack set farther toward the superstructure, and had a long raised forecastle.

== World War II ==
The SS Claremont Victory was launched by the Oregon Shipbuilding Corporation on 12 January 1944 and completed on 28 February 1944. The ship's United States Maritime Commission designation was VC2-S-AP3, hull number 102 (1018). The Maritime Commission turned her over to a civilian contractor, the American President Lines, for operation.

The SS Claremont Victory was used as a cargo ship during World War II, including transporting supplies for the Battle of Okinawa. During the 82 days of the Battle of Okinawa (April 1 to June 22, 1945), merchant shipping came under aerial attack, including Kamikaze attack planes. The Claremont Victory′s anti-aircraft weaponry, including her 5-inch deck gun, were used to help repel these attacks. SS Claremont Victory and 96 other Victory ships were converted to troopships to bring American soldiers home as part of Operation Magic Carpet.

== Honors ==
The crew of the Naval Armed Guard on the SS Claremont Victory earned "Battle Stars" for meritorious participation in combat during the invasion of Okinawa from 10 April 1945 to 22 April 1945.

== Post war ==
With the war coming to an end, and a reduced need for military shipping, the Claremont Victory was laid up on the James River National Defense Reserve Fleet in Virginia in 1946. She was then sold to the Compania Argentina De Navigacion Dodera S.A., in Argentina for $1,005,431.00 on Nov. 19, 1946 and renamed the SS Hornero. In 1949 she was sold to Flota Argentina de Nav. de Ultramar, Buenos Aires. In 1961 she was sold to Empresa Líneas Marítimas Argentinas, Buenos Aires. In 1975 she was removed from service and laid up in Buenos Aires. In 1978 she was scrapped at Campana, Argentina.

== See also ==
- List of Victory ships
- Liberty ship
- Type C1 ship
- Type C2 ship
- Type C3 ship

== Sources ==
- Sawyer, L.A. and W.H. Mitchell. Victory ships and tankers: The history of the ‘Victory’ type cargo ships and of the tankers built in the United States of America during World War II, Cornell Maritime Press, 1974, 0-87033-182-5.
- United States Maritime Commission:
- Victory Cargo Ships
