= SS N. Y. U. Victory =

Victory ship of the United States

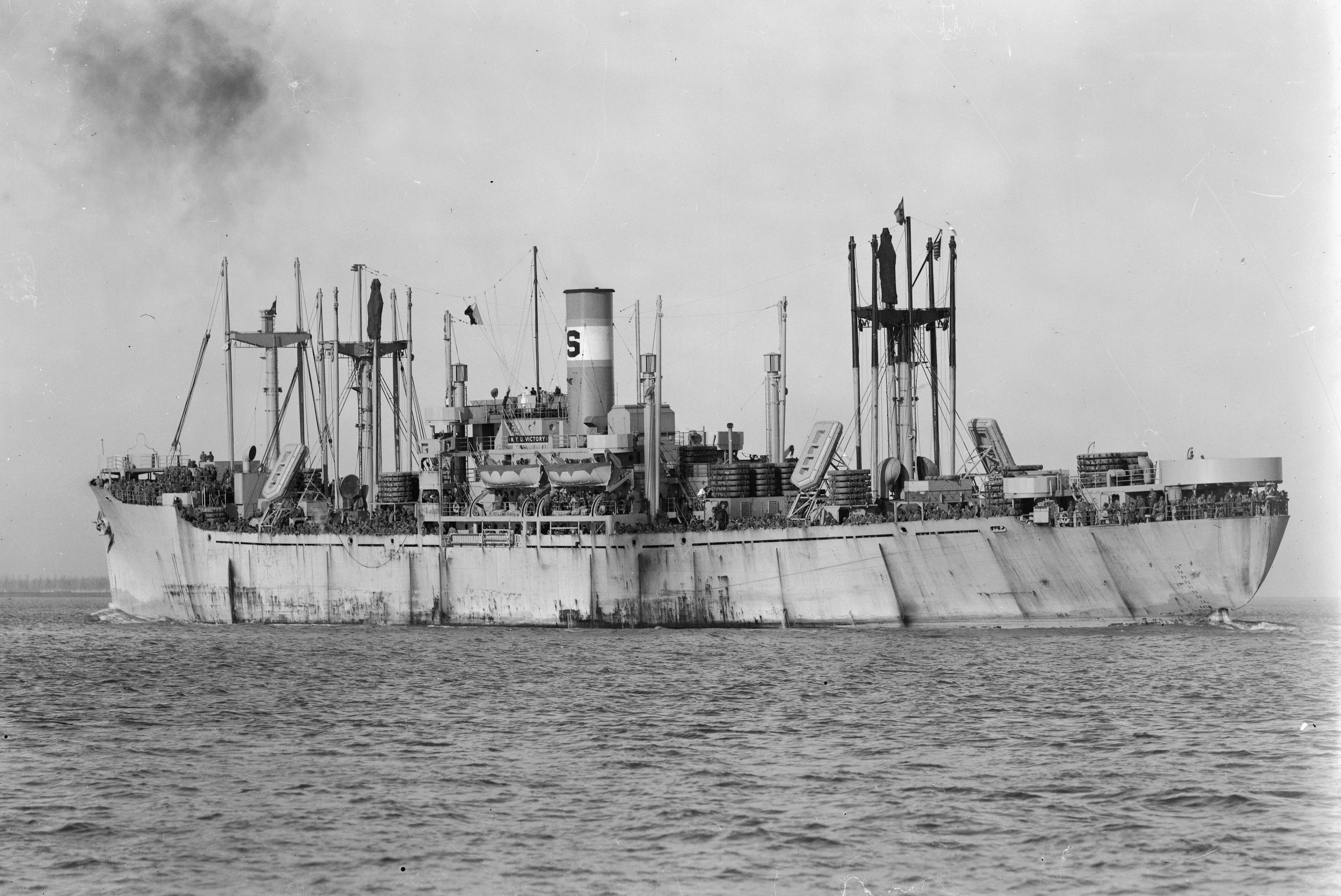
- N.Y.U. Victory sailing with troops from Antwerp

History

United States
- Name: SS N. Y. U. Victory
- Namesake: New York University
- Builder: Bethlehem-Fairfield Shipyard Corp. (Baltimore, Maryland)
- Yard number: 2473
- Laid down: 26 March 1945
- Launched: 16 May 1945
- Acquired: 1 June 1945
- Commissioned: 26 July 1945
- Decommissioned: 1947
- Renamed: Cordoba (1947)
- Refit: Troop transport (1945); Freight and passenger ship (1947); Freighter (1955)
- Identification: MARAD: 247726; Call sign: LQAS; IMO number: 5079719
- Fate: Scrapped in Campana, March 1972

General characteristics
- Tonnage: 7,607 Tons (Gross), 4,551 Tons (Net)
- Displacement: 15,200 Tons (Full Load), 10,8750 Tons (Lightweight)
- Length: 455 ft (139 m)
- Beam: 62 ft (19 m)
- Draft: 28 ft 0 in (8.53 m)
- Propulsion: 2 B&W oil-fired steam boilers, 2 steam turbines, single propeller, 6,000shp
- Speed: 16 knots
- Capacity: 1597
- Armament: 5" 38 Dual Purpose Gun, 3" Anti-Aircraft Gun, 8 20MM Caliber Guns
- Notes: Hull Type: C2-S-AP2; MCV hull #612

SS N. Y. U. Victory was a Type C2 Victory ship-based VC2-S-AP2 troop transport built for the U.S. Army Transportation Corps late in World War II. Launched in May 1945, it saw service in the European Theater of Operations in the immediate post-war period repatriating U.S. troops.

After being laid up in the U.S., SS N. Y. U. Victory was purchased by Argentinian shipping line Empresa Líneas Marítimas Argentinas and renamed Cordoba. She was scrapped at Campana in March 1972.

== History ==
=== Construction and operation ===
SS N. Y. U. Victory was laid down 26 March 1945 as a U.S. MARCOM Type C2 ship-based VC2-S-AP2 hull by Bethlehem-Fairfield Shipyard of Baltimore, Maryland. Launched 26 May 1945, she was then converted into a dedicated troopship, and delivered to the War Shipping Administration on 23 June 1945.

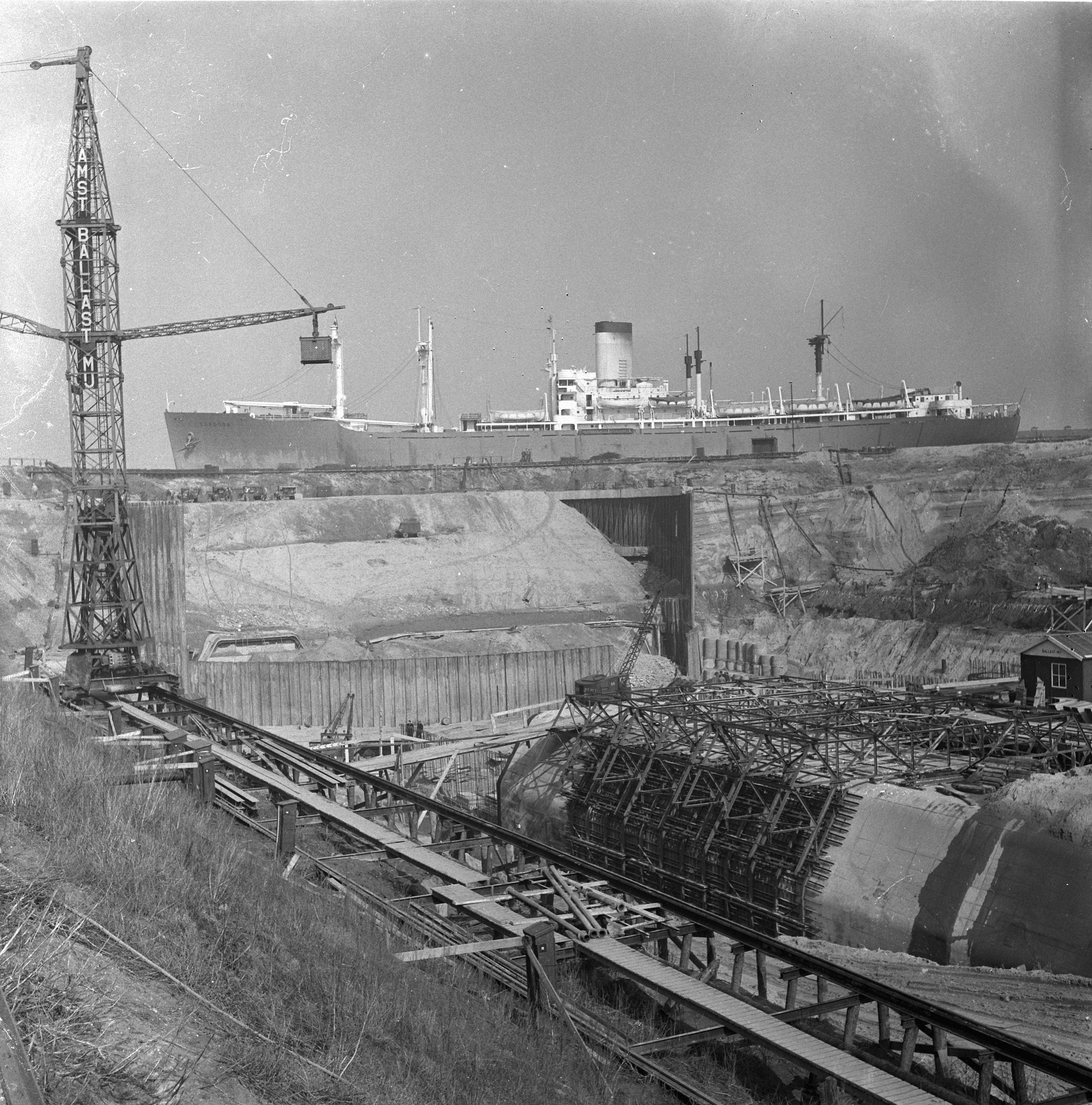
The Cordoba steaming on the North Sea Canal in 1954. Below is the Velsertunnel under construction.

=== World War II ===
==== Units transported ====
Units transported by the SS N. Y. U. Victory include:

- 1269th Engineer Combat Battalion, August 1945.

=== Post-war ===
After being briefly laid up in the U.S., SS N.Y.U. Victory was purchased by Argentinian shipping line Empresa Líneas Marítimas Argentinas and renamed Cordoba. She was scrapped at Campana in March 1972.

== See also ==
- SS Maritime Victory, a similar VC2-S-AP2 Victory ship conversion into a dedicated troopship
- SS American Victory, a similar VC2-S-AP2 vessel preserved as a museum ship
