= Empresa Líneas Marítimas Argentinas =

Argentine cargo shipping line

- House flag
- Industry: Transportation
- Predecessor: Flota Mercante del Estado (FME); Flota Argentina de Navegación de Ultramar (FANU)
- Founded: 1960
- Defunct: 1996
- Headquarters: Buenos Aires, Argentina
- Area served: Transatlantic
- Owner: Argentine government

Empresa Líneas Marítimas Argentinas (ELMA) (English: Argentine Shipping Lines Company) was an Argentine cargo shipping line established on September 30, 1960. The Argentine Maritime Lines Company involved the merger of two companies, both state: the Merchant Fleet of the State (FME) and Argentina Fleet of Navigation of Ultramar (FANU). It served Argentina's foreign trade until the 1990s, when the government of Carlos Menem declared its dissolution. At its peak its fleet had more than 60 ships (approximately 700,000 tonnes DW). Ships sailed to Northern Europe, the United Kingdom, the Baltic Sea, the Mediterranean, the east coasts of the United States of America and Canada, the Gulf of Mexico, the Pacific, the Middle East and Far East and Africa.

== World War II ships ==
One of the first ships was a used World War II ship; in 1946 the SS Bozeman Victory was sold to Compañía Argentina de Navegación Dodero, Buenos Aires, Argentina and renamed SS Campero. In 1949 she was sold to Flota Argentina de Navegación de Ultramar, Buenos Aires. In 1961 she was sold to Empresa Líneas Marítimas Argentinas, Buenos Aires. In 1972 she was scrapped at Campana, Argentina.

Other ships purchased

- Victory ships: SS Rock Hill Victory, SS Fairmont Victory, SS Gustavus Victory, SS Western Reserve Victory, SS William and Mary Victory, SS Nicaragua Victory, SS N. Y. U. Victory, SS Bellingham Victory, SS Altoona Victory, SS Chelsea Victory, SS Claremont Victory, SS Smith Victory and SS Howard Victory.
- Liberty ships: SS Cleveland Forbes and SS Louis A. Sengteller.
- Park ship: SS Kootenay Park (2)

== ELMA and the Argentine naval industry ==
During the 1960s a fleet renewal plan was put in place, giving priority to constructions in Argentine shipyards. Lago Argentino, Lago Aluminé and Almirante Stewart ships were built by State Shipyards and Naval Factories ((in Spanish) Astilleros y Fabricas Navales del Estado- AFNE). After these, three more were built: Río de la Plata, Río Paraná and Rio Calchaquí. With these successes five more ships were built: Río Cincel, Río Teuco, Río Deseado, Río Gualeguay and Río Iguazú.

The shipyards ASTARSA ((in Spanish) Astilleros Argentinos Río de La Plata S.A.) built the ships Río Limay, Río Esquel and Río Olivia. In "Astilleros y Fabricacionales Navales del Estado" (A.F.N.E.) en Ensenada/BsAs a series of six ships were built: Almirante Storni, Neuquén II, Libertador General José de San Martín, Dr Atilio Malvagni, President Ramón S. Castillo and General Manuel Belgrano. Then a series of three ships: Buenos Aires II, Córdoba and La Pampa in ASTARSA again. This brought the ELMA fleet to 23 ships totaling just over 272,000 tonnes. The last additions to the fleet came with three refrigerated vessels from Alianza Shipyards ((in Spanish) Astilleros Alianza): Glaciar Perito Moreno, Glaciar Viedma and Glaciar Ameghino. And two AFNE container ships: Isla Gran Malvina and Isla Soledad.

== Falklands War ==
In 1982 the ELMA ships Río Carcarañá and Formosa participated in the Falklands War ((in Spanish) Guerra de las Malvinas), which resulted in the sinking of the former by a series of British air strikes and the damage of the latter due to friendly fire from an Argentine Air Force A-4 Skyhawk.

== Demise ==
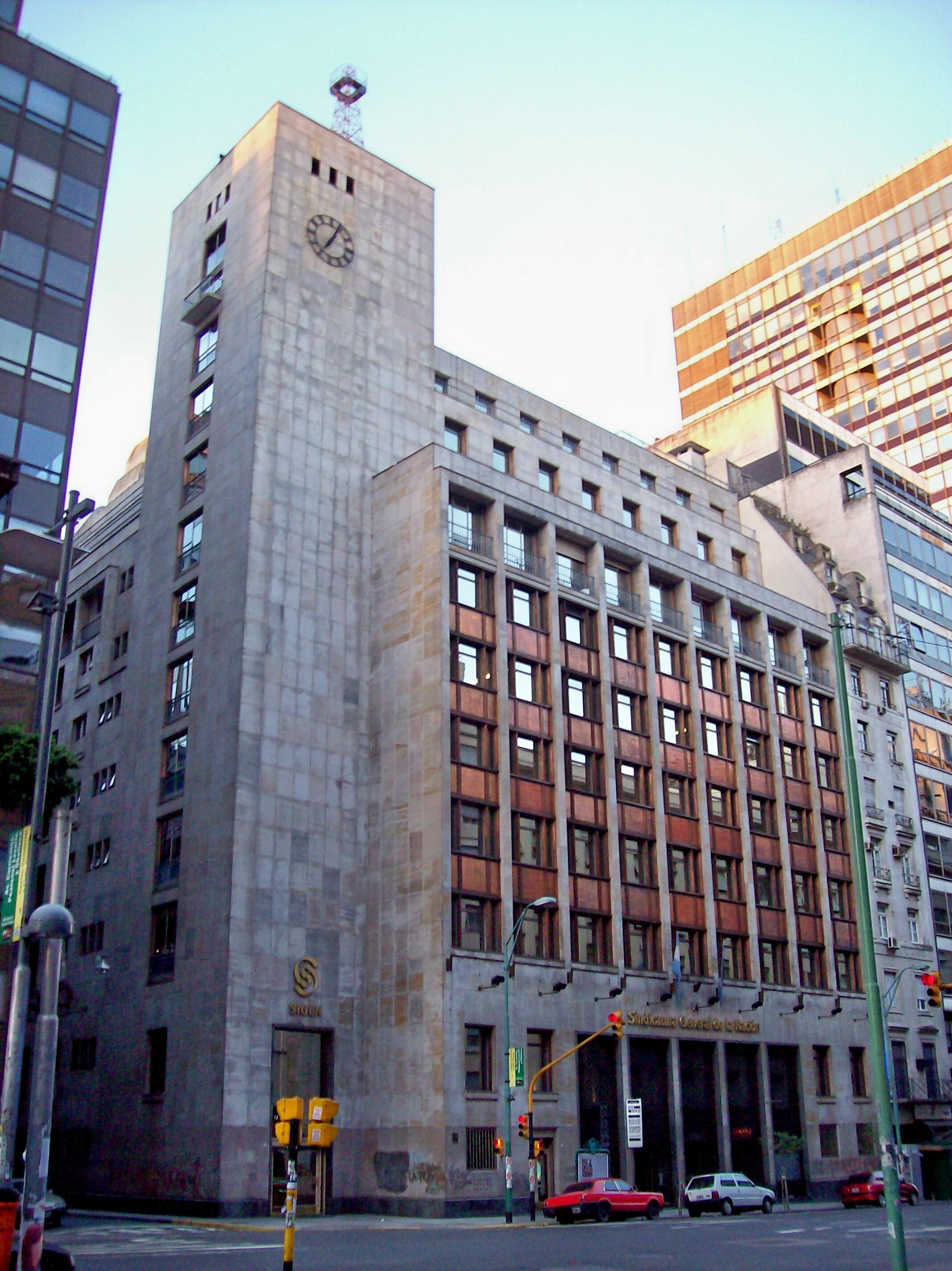
Former head office of ELMA in Buenos Aires, 2007

ELMA was dismantled during the 1990s as part of president Carlos Menem's 1990s state reform laws.
