= SS William and Mary Victory =

Victory ship of the United States

- A Typical Victory Ship.

History

United States
- Name: SS William and Mary
- Namesake: College of William & Mary
- Owner: War Shipping Administration
- Operator: International Freighting Company
- Builder: Bethlehem Steel *Fairfield Shipyard, Inc.
- Laid down: 1945-3-6
- Launched: 1945-04-20
- Christened: 1945-04-20
- Completed: 1945-5-15
- Commissioned: Troopship
- Fate: Sold in 1947

History

Argentina
- Name: SS Mendoza 1947
- Owner: Compana Argentina de Nav.Dodero,
- Operator: Compana Argentina de Nav.Dodero,
- Reclassified: Commercial Cargo Ship
- Fate: Sold in 1947

History

Argentina
- Name: SS Mendoza 1947
- Owner: Flota Argentina se Nav. de Ultramar
- Operator: Flota Argentina se Nav. de Ultramar
- Recommissioned: 1952 as Commercial passenger ship
- Fate: Sold in 1949

History

Argentina
- Name: SS Mendoza 1949
- Owner: Empresa Lineas Maritimas Argentinas
- Operator: Empresa Lineas Maritimas ArgentinasUltramar
- Recommissioned: Commercial Cargo Ship 1961
- Fate: Scrapped at Campana, Buenos Aires, Argentina 1972

General characteristics
- Displacement: 7725 tons (light displacement)
- Length: 139 m (456 ft)
- Beam: 18.9 m (62 ft)
- Draft: 7 m (23 ft)
- Propulsion: Westinghouse steam turbines, single shaft, 8500 horsepower (6.3 MW)
- Speed: 17.5 knots (32.4 km/h) maximum sustained, 21 knots emergency
- Range: 12,500 nm at 12 knots
- Complement: 62 Merchant Marine and 28 US Naval Armed Guards as Victory ship.*358 officers and men
- Armament: 1 × 5 inch (127 mm)/38 caliber gun as As Victory Ship; 1 × 3 inch (76 mm)/50 caliber gun; 8 × 20 mm Oerlikon
- Aircraft carried: none
- Aviation facilities: none

The SS William and Mary was a Victory ship built during World War II.

Named for the College of William & Mary, an American flag flown on the vessel survives in the college's Swem Library's special collections.

== Service life ==
SS William and Mary Victory was part of the series of Victory ships named after educational institutions, in this case, the College of William and Mary. Her design type was VC2-S-AP2/WSAT. Her Maritime Commission (MCV) hull number was 652 and her shipyard number was 1597. She was built by Bethlehem Shipbuilding Corporation in Baltimore, Maryland.

She was launched and christened on 20 April 1945. Her sponsor was Eleanor Harvey, the retiring president of the Women Students' Cooperative Government Association at the College of William and Mary and a member of the class of 1945. U.S. Naval Air Corps Lieutenant Robert Eastman, an alumnus of the college, pushed the button that released the ship into the water. Edie Harwood, president of the Women Students' Cooperative Government Association, was Harvey's maid of honor.

SS William and Mary Victory served in the Atlantic Ocean in World War II operated by the International Freighting Company. She served as a troop ship take troop to Europe. On April 17, 1946, she departed Le Havre, France for New Jersey, bring home troops. On January 25, 1946, she streamed into New York to bring troops home. SS William and Mary Victory arrived in New York from Antwerp on February 26, 1946, with 1.457 troops, including 381st Engineer Combat Battalion and 34Sth Engineer Combat Battalion. SS William and Mary Victory and 96 other Victory ships were converted to troop ships to bring the US soldiers home as part of Operation Magic Carpet.

After WW2 in 1946, she was laid up in the James River. In 1947 she was sold to Compana Argentina de Nav.Dodero, in Buenos Aires, Argentina and renamed Mendoza. In 1949 she was sold to Flota Argentina se Nav. de Ultramar in Buenos Aires. In 1952 she was rebuilt as a passenger ship with accommodation. In 1961 she was sold to Empresa Líneas Marítimas Argentinas, in Buenos Aires, converted back to a cargo ship. In 1972 she was scrapped at Campana, Buenos Aires, Argentina.

== Artifacts ==
The christening bottle for the SS William and Mary Victory is in the Special Collections Research Center (SCRC) in Swem Library at the College of William and Mary. An American flag that was flown on the ship is also available in the SCRC. The flag was a gift of Captain James Hassell on May 2, 1946.

== See also ==
- Liberty ship - Previous cargo ship.
- List of Victory ships
- Type C1 ship
- Type C2 ship
- Type C3 ship
