= Flota Mercante del Estado =

Merchant fleet of Argentina

General Administration (1941–1958) State-owned enterprise (1958–1960) overview
- Formed: 1941
- Dissolved: 1960
- Jurisdiction: National
- Parent department: Ministry of the Navy (Argentina) (1941); Ministry of Transport (Argentina) (1958)
- Parent General Administration (1941–1958) State-owned enterprise (1958–1960): National Executive Power

The Flota Mercante del Estado (English: State Merchant Marine) was a public agency in Argentina that provided maritime transport services from its creation in 1941 until its dissolution in 1960 with the establishment of the Argentine Maritime Lines Company (ELMA).

== History ==
The organization was established in 1941 by decree No. 103316 on October 16, 1941, by the Vice President, acting as Executive Power, Ramón S. Castillo. Initially, the State Merchant Fleet operated under the Ministerio de Marina (English: Ministry of the Navy).

The fleet initially consisted of sixteen Italian-origin ships that were in Argentine ports. Later, it acquired several newly constructed ships in Europe.

In 1952, it became part of the Empresa Nacional de Transportes (ENT), a national transport enterprise under the Ministry of Transport, alongside other public transport agencies. The ENT operated until 1956 under the administration of the self-proclaimed Revolución Libertadora.

In 1958, the Executive Power reorganized the State Merchant Fleet into a state-owned enterprise under the State-owned Enterprise Act.

During the presidency of Arturo Frondizi, the Empresa Líneas Marítimas Argentinas (ELMA) was created by law, integrating the State Merchant Fleet and the Flota Argentina de Navegación de Ultramar.
