= Okinawa naval order of battle =

Landings on Okinawa and neighboring islands

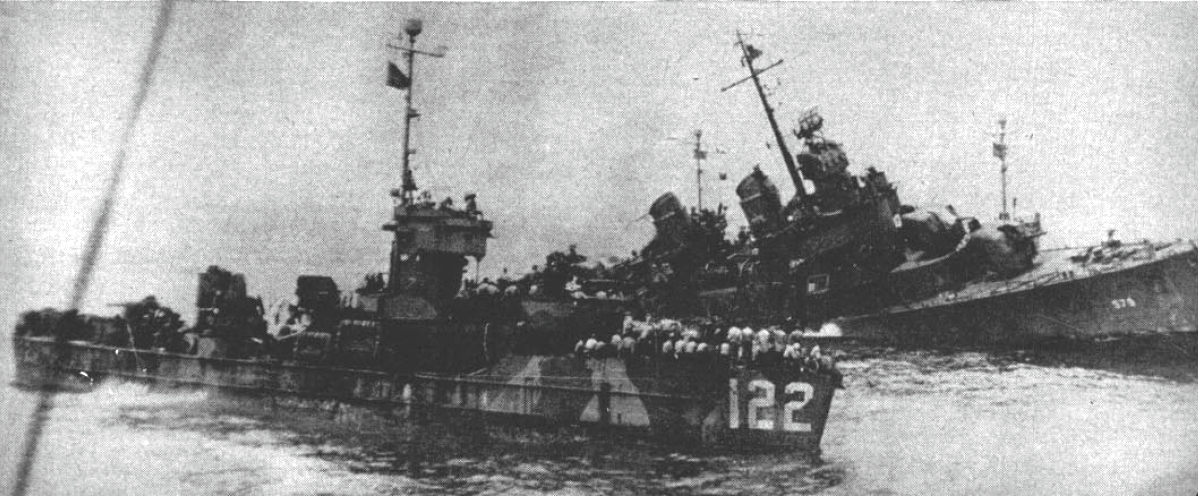
Destroyer William D. Porter sinks after a kamikaze attack off Okinawa, 10 June 1945. A landing craft, support stands by to pick up survivors.

For the April 1945 invasion of Okinawa (Allied codename: Operation Iceberg), the Allies assembled the most powerful naval force in history. Since the few remaining capital ships of the Imperial Japanese Combined Fleet had been sunk or otherwise put out of action at the Battle of Leyte Gulf, the Allies were effectively unopposed in terms of major surface vessels; a single mission consisting of the superbattleship Yamato and a few escorts was undertaken, but the task force did not get within 200 nautical miles (370 km; 230 mi) of the invasion area. The main Japanese naval opposition within the invasion area came from hundreds of Imperial Japanese Navy Shin'yō-class suicide motorboats and Maru-Ni Imperial Japanese Army attack boats.

Since the Japanese air arm had been equally decimated by this point in the war, the lack of trained and experienced pilots led them to deploy the kamikaze extensively in the waters off Okinawa.

US Navy combat ships:
11 fleet carriers, 6 light carriers, 22 escort carriers, 8 fast battleships, 10 old battleships, 2 large cruisers, 13 heavy cruisers, 13 light cruisers, 4 anti-aircraft light cruisers, 132 destroyers, 45 destroyer escorts

Amphibious assault vessels:
84 attack transports, 29 attack cargo ships, LCIs, LSMs, LSTs, LSVs, etc.

Auxiliaries:
52 submarine chasers, 23 fast minesweepers, 69 minesweepers, 11 minelayers, 49 oilers, etc.

Royal Navy combat ships:
5 fleet carriers, 2 battleships, 7 light cruisers, 14 destroyers

Losses
The smaller ships were least able to withstand damage from kamikaze attacks.

- 12 to kamikaze: Twiggs, Mannert L. Abele, Callaghan, William D. Porter, Pringle, Bush, Dickerson, Emmons, Swallow, Canada Victory, Logan Victory, Hobbs Victory
- 2 to mines: Halligan, Skylark
- 1 to collision: Thornton

== Allied command structure ==
Naval commanders for Operation Iceberg

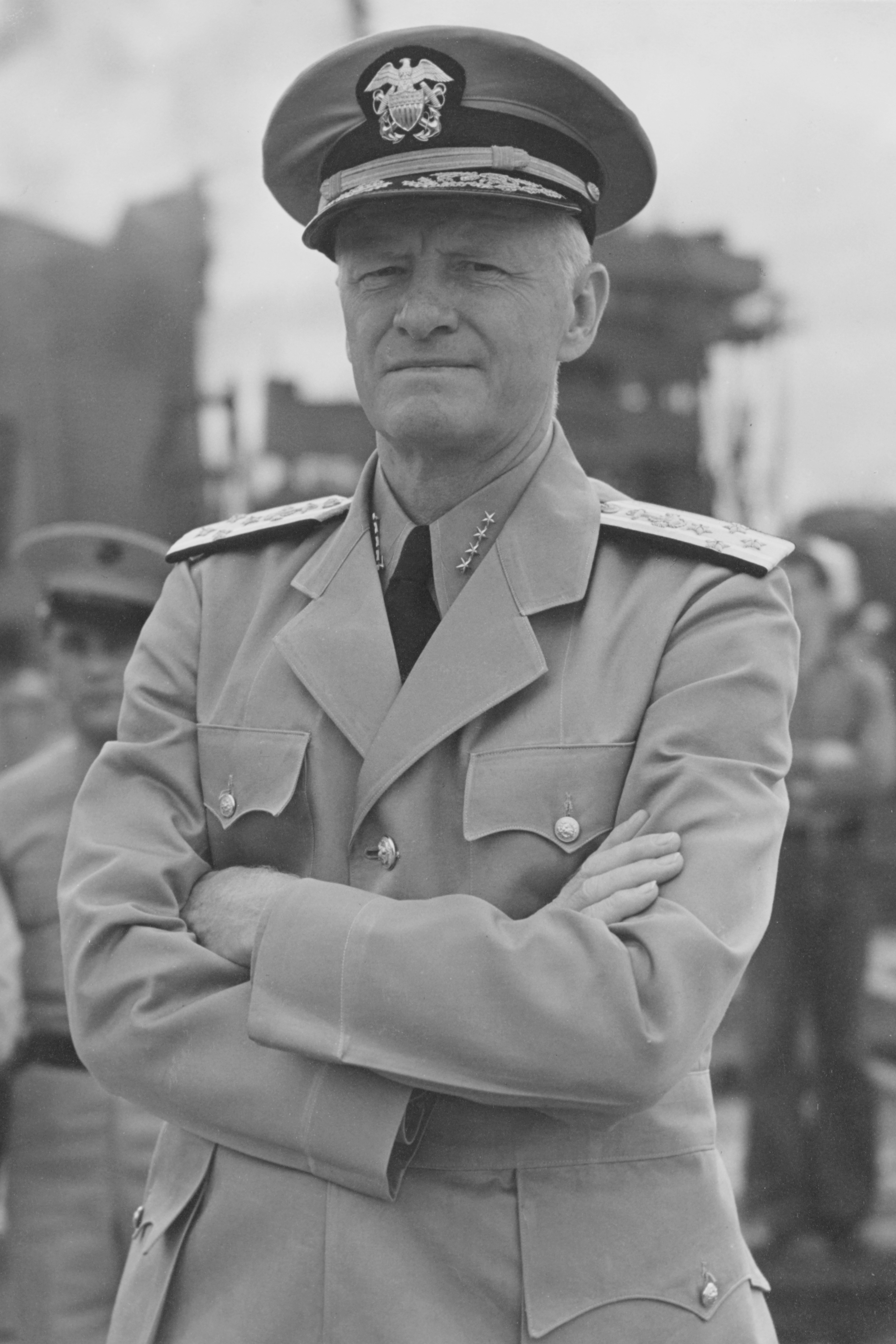
Adm. Chester W. Nimitz

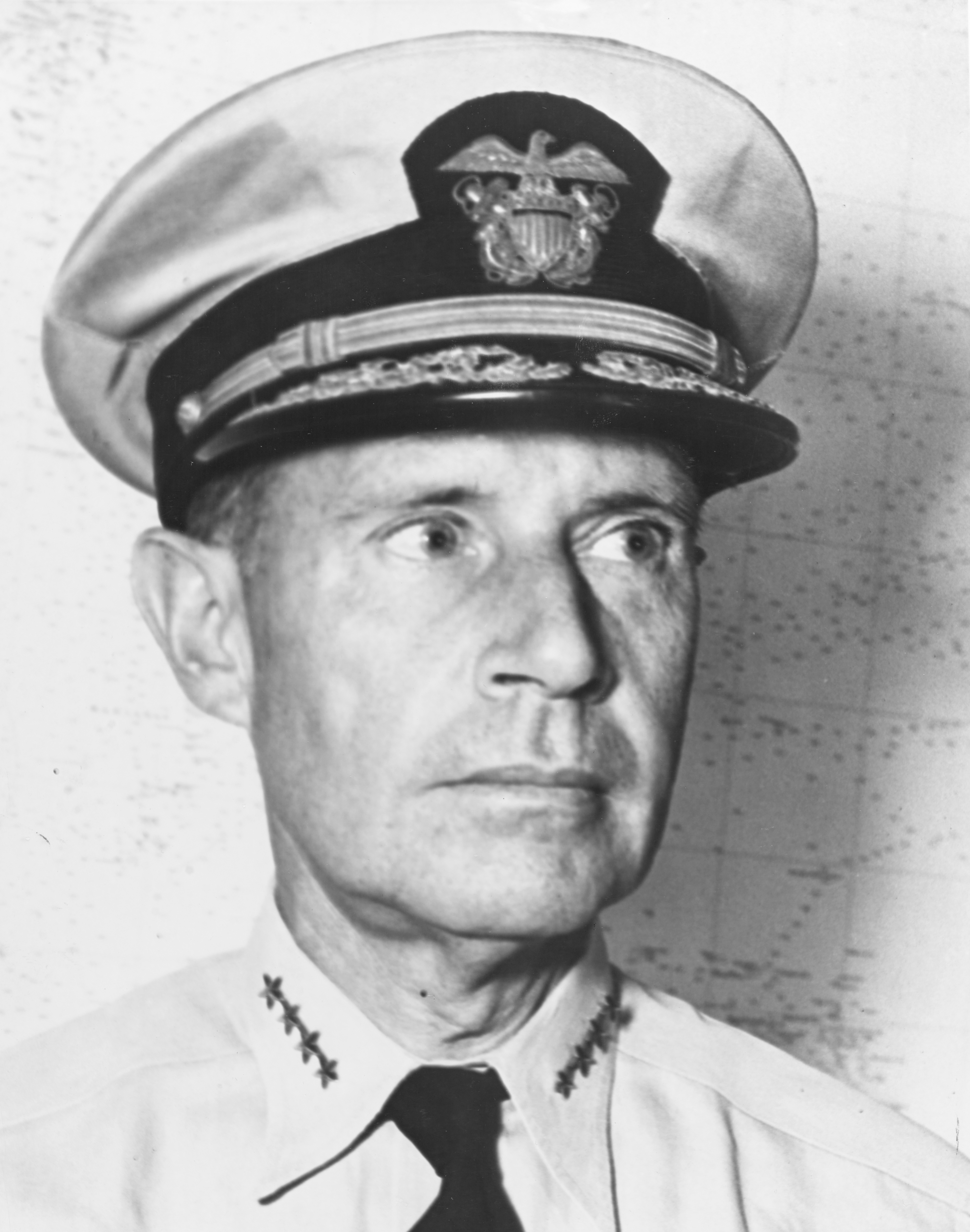
Adm. Raymond A. Spruance

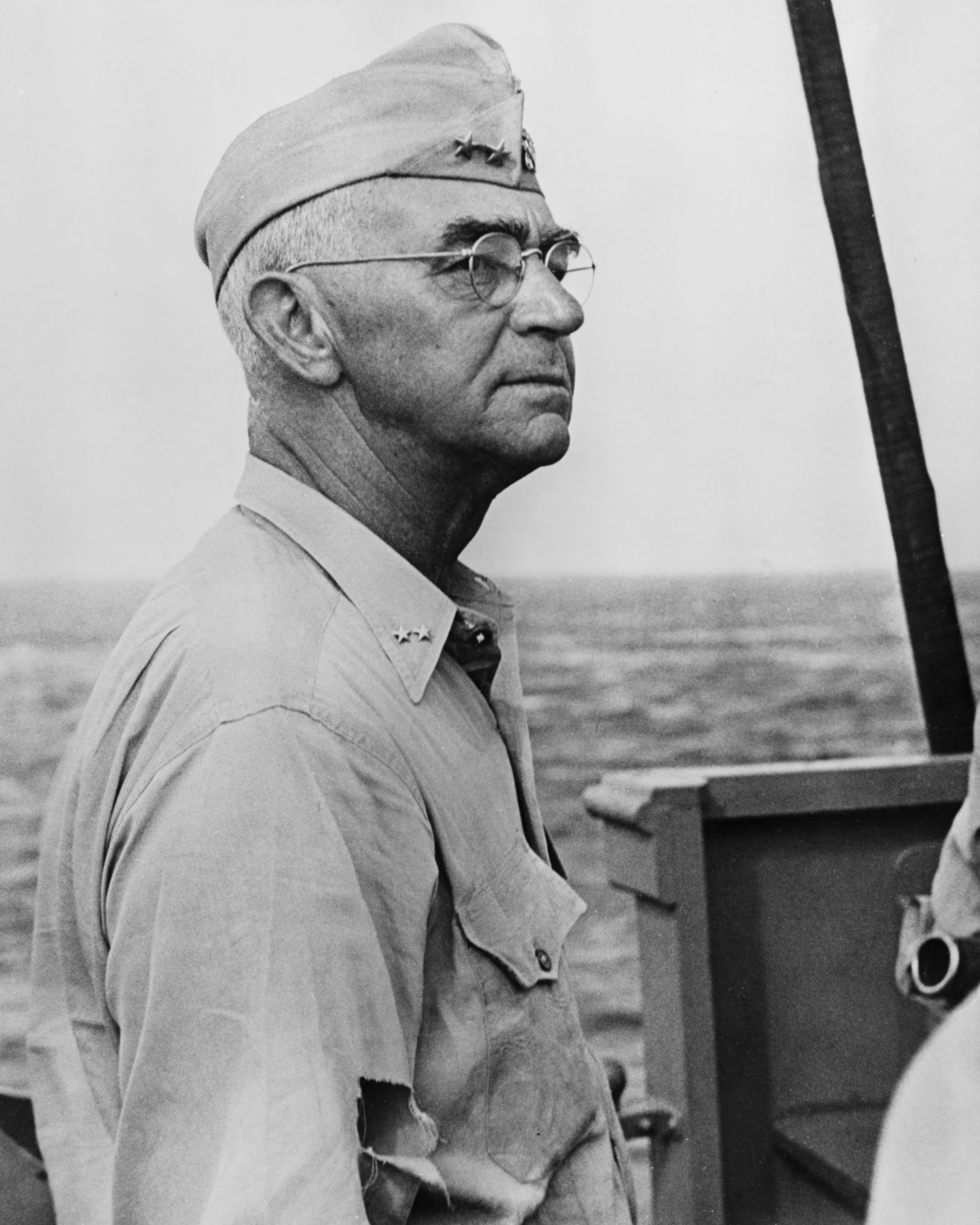
Vice Adm. Richmond Kelly Turner

Ground force commanders

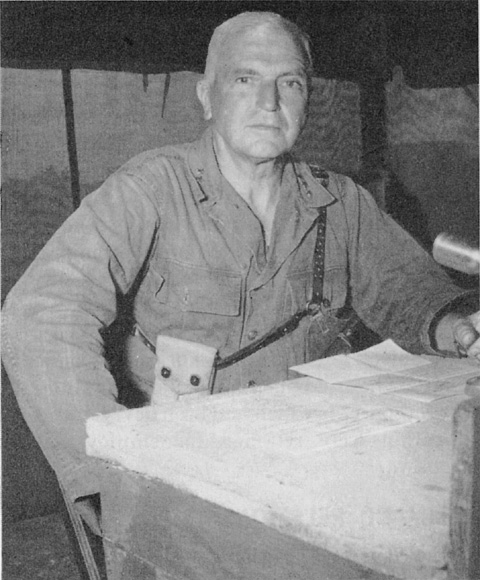
Lt. Gen. Simon B. Buckner, USA (KIA)

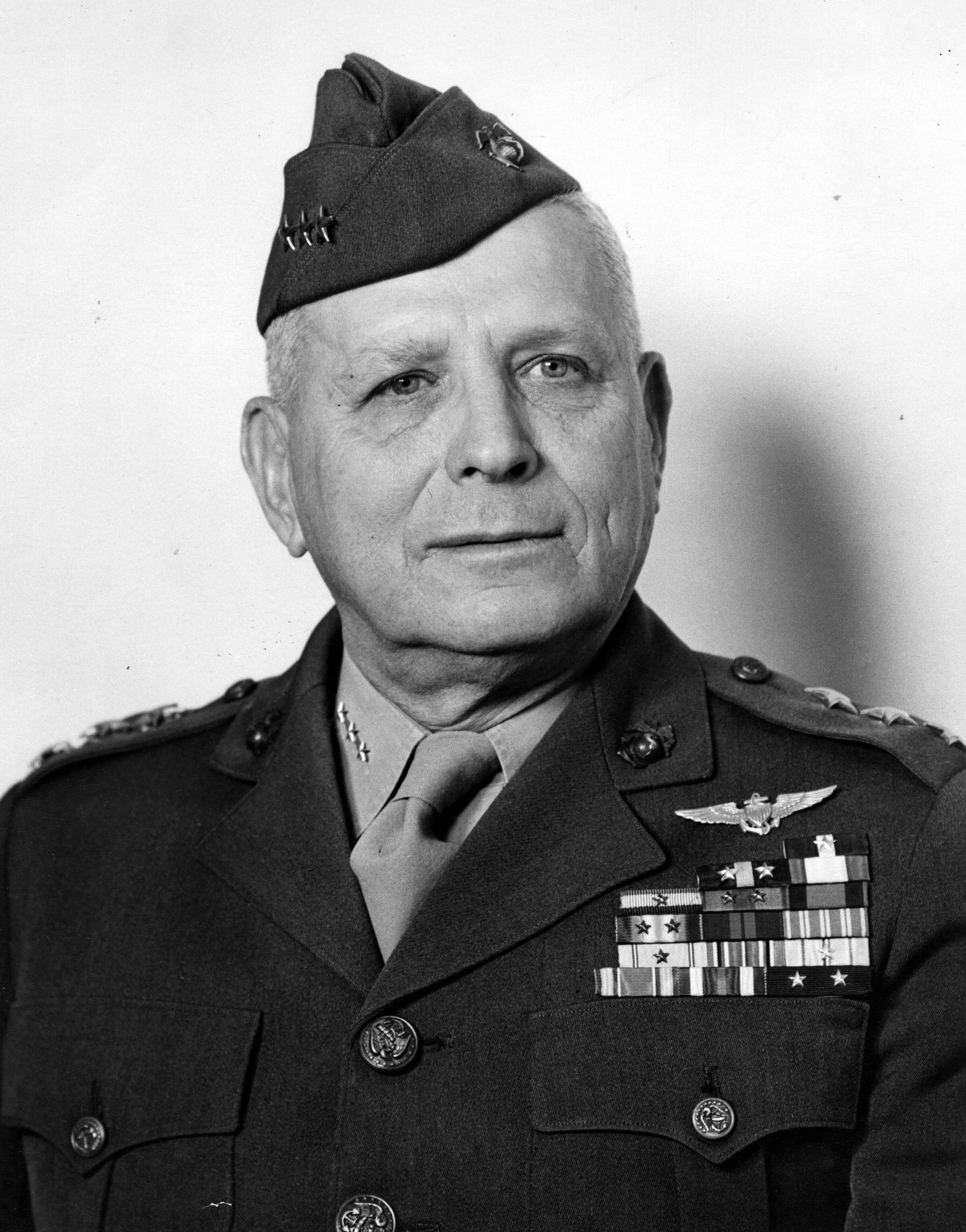
Maj. Gen. Roy S. Geiger, USMC

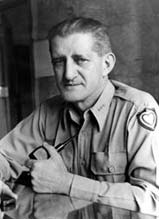
Maj. Gen. John R. Hodge, USA

=== Naval ===
The roles of Commander in Chief, Pacific Ocean Areas (CINCPOA) and Commander in Chief, U.S. Pacific Fleet (CINCPAC) were both exercised by Admiral Chester W. Nimitz from his headquarters at Pearl Harbor, Hawaii.

Since the "Big Blue Fleet" was at this time under the command of Admiral Raymond Spruance aboard his flagship USS Indianapolis, the force was designated Fifth Fleet. (It had been Third Fleet until Spruance relieved Admiral William Halsey in January, as part of the "alternating command" system).

The ships and troops of Operation Iceberg were under direct operational command of Rear Admiral Richmond Kelly Turner aboard amphibious command ship Eldorado.

=== Ground troops ===
Lt. Gen. Simon Bolivar Buckner, Jr. was killed on 18 June while visiting a forward observation post. A Japanese artillery shell struck a coral outcropping, fragments of which struck Buckner in the chest. Command of Tenth Army passed to Marine Maj. Gen. Roy S. Geiger.

United States Tenth Army (Lt. Gen. Simon Bolivar Buckner, Jr. (KIA))

III Amphibious Corps (Maj. Gen. Roy S. Geiger)

Left beaches: 6th Marine Division (Maj. Gen. Lemuel C. Shepherd, Jr.)
Right beaches: 1st Marine Division (Maj. Gen. Pedro A. del Valle)

XXIV Army Corps (Maj. Gen. John R. Hodge)

Left beaches: 7th Infantry ("Bayonet") Division (Maj. Gen. A.V. Arnold)
Right beaches: 96th Infantry ("Deadeye") Division (Maj. Gen. J.L. Bradley)
Landed L+8: 27th Infantry ("New York") Division (Maj. Gen. G.W. Griner, Jr.)

Tactical Air Force, Tenth Army (Maj. Gen. Francis P. Mulcahy, USMC; Maj. Gen. Louis E. Woods, USMC)

== Allied amphibious forces ==
=== Joint Expeditionary Force (Task Force 51) ===
Amphibious command ships

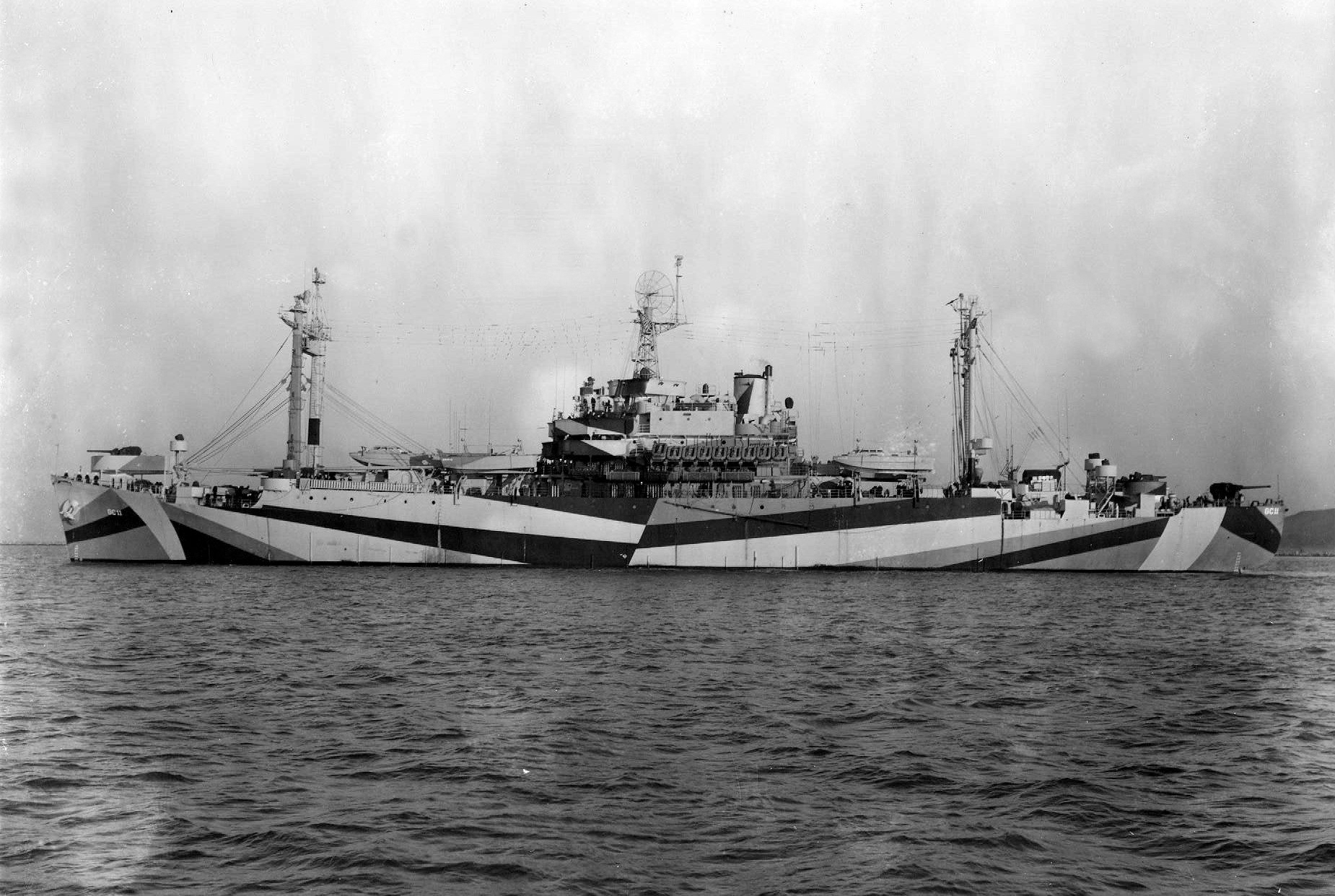
USS Eldorado

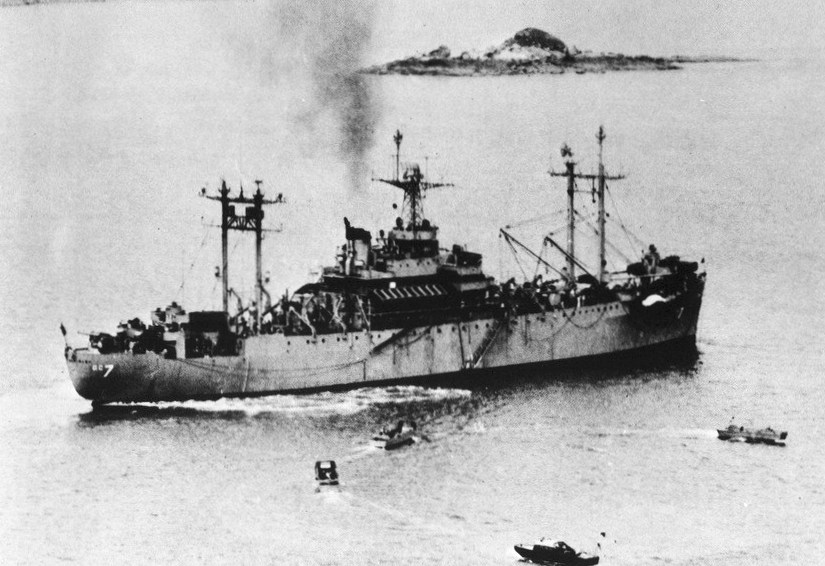
USS Mount McKinley

Vice Admiral Richmond Kelly Turner in amphibious command ship Eldorado

Western Islands Attack Group (Task Group 51.1)

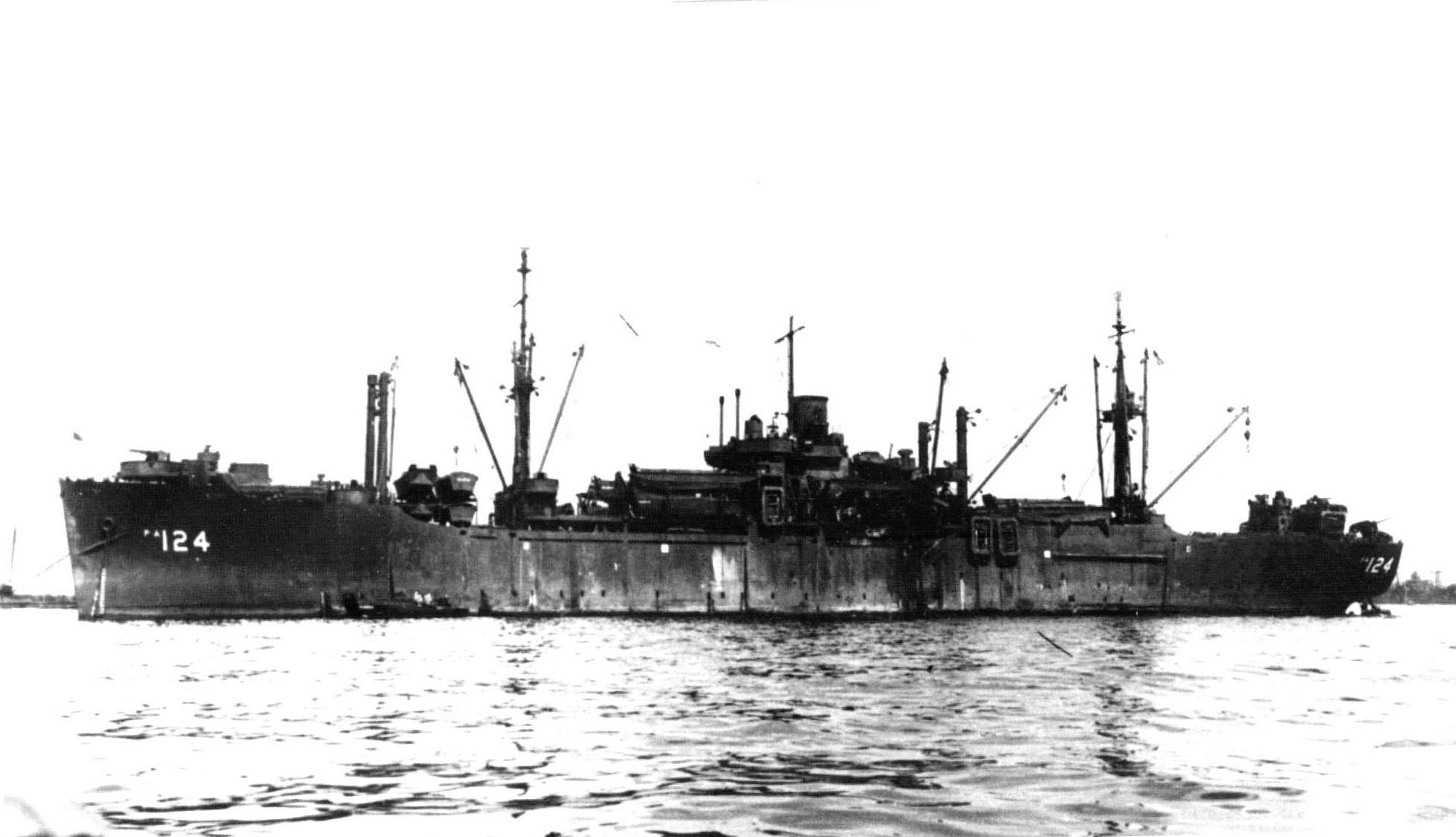
Attack transport LaGrange

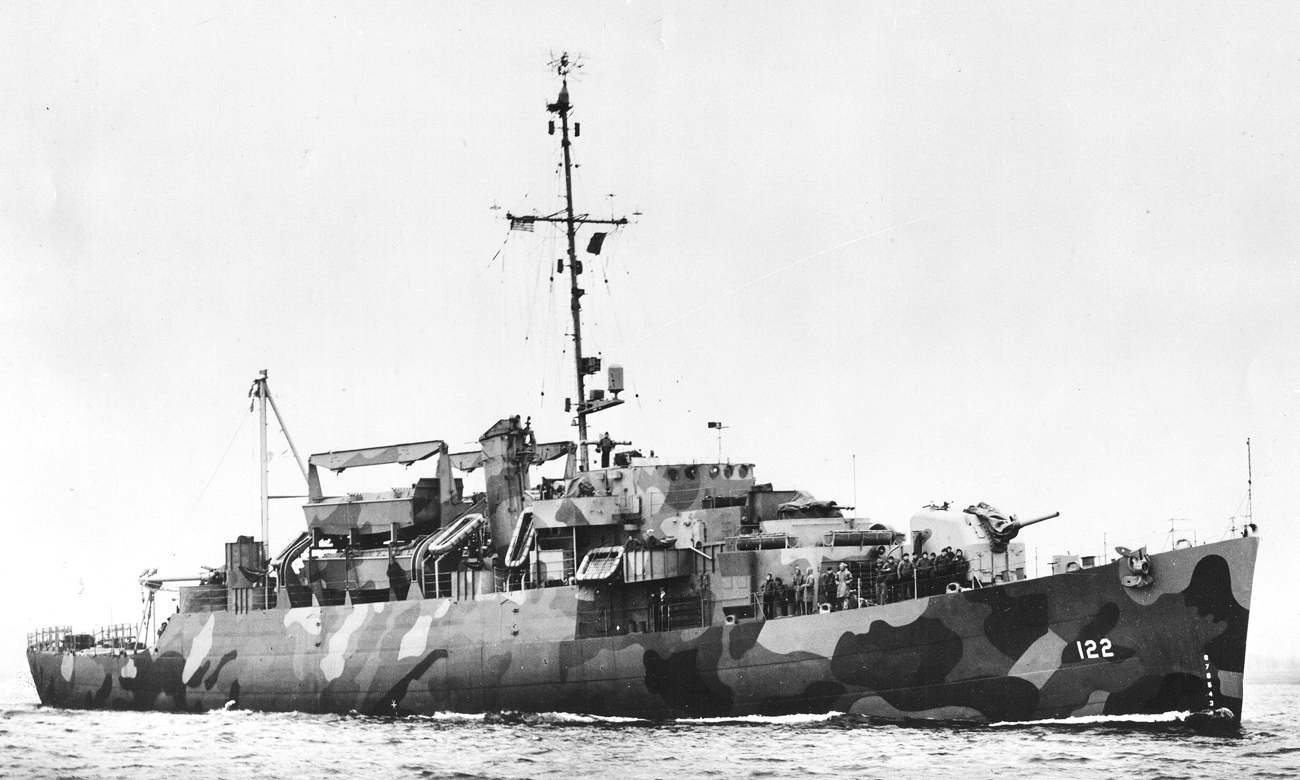
Destroyer transport Scribner

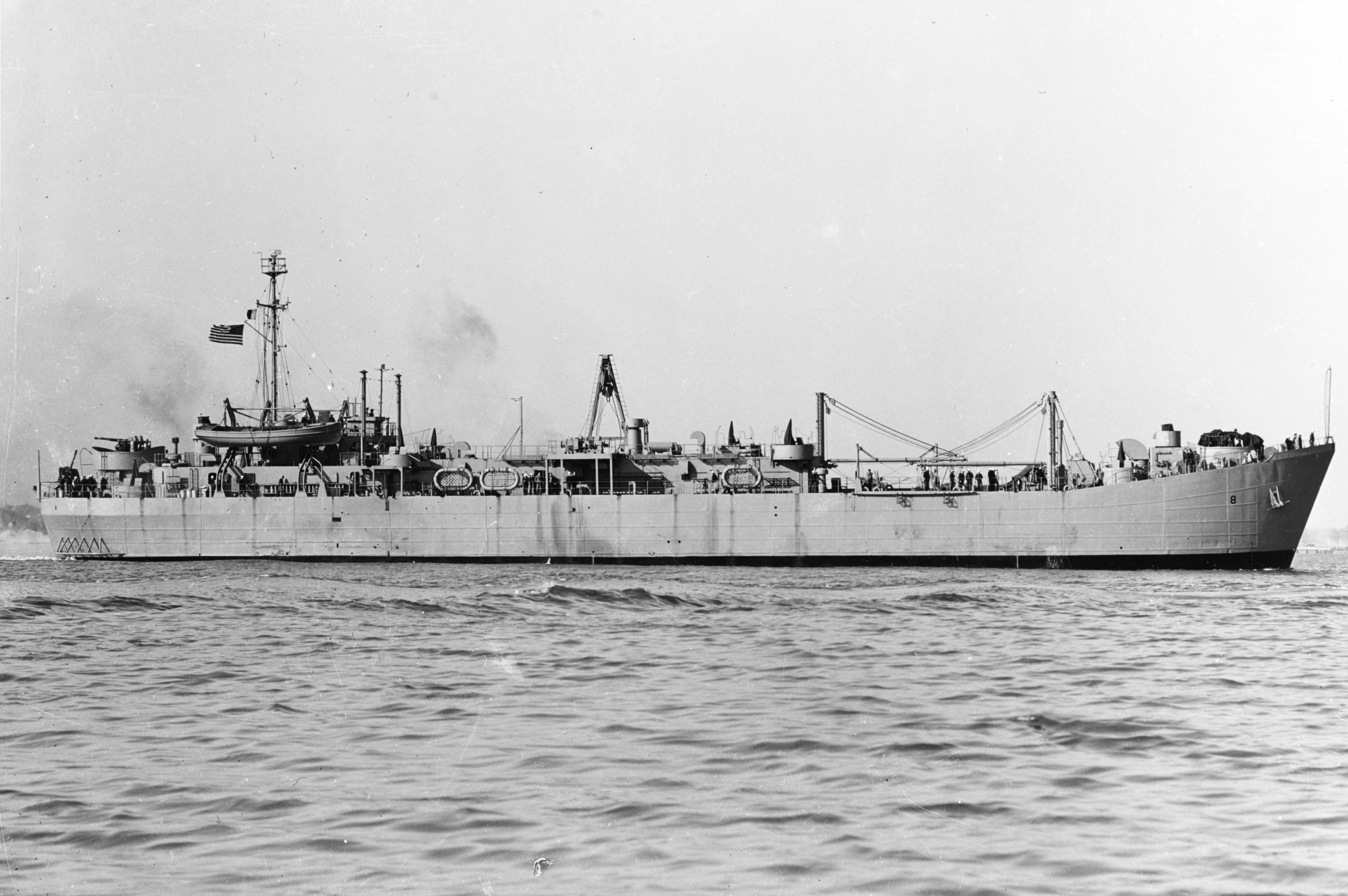
Landing craft repair ship Egeria

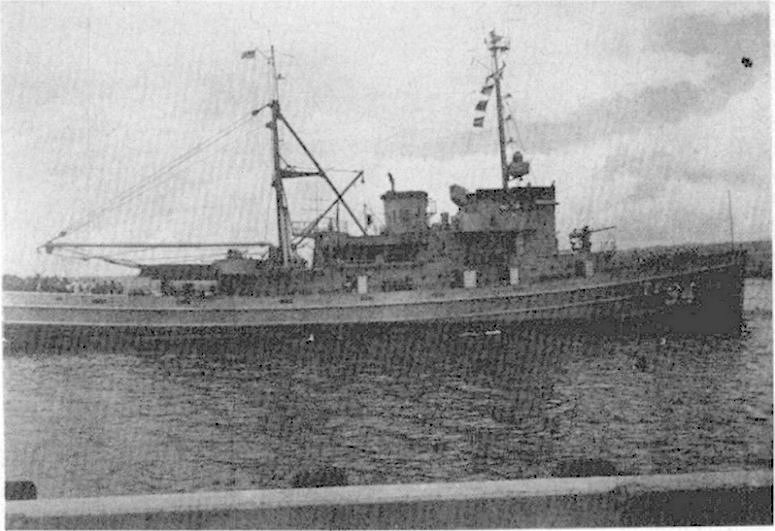
Tugboat Yuma

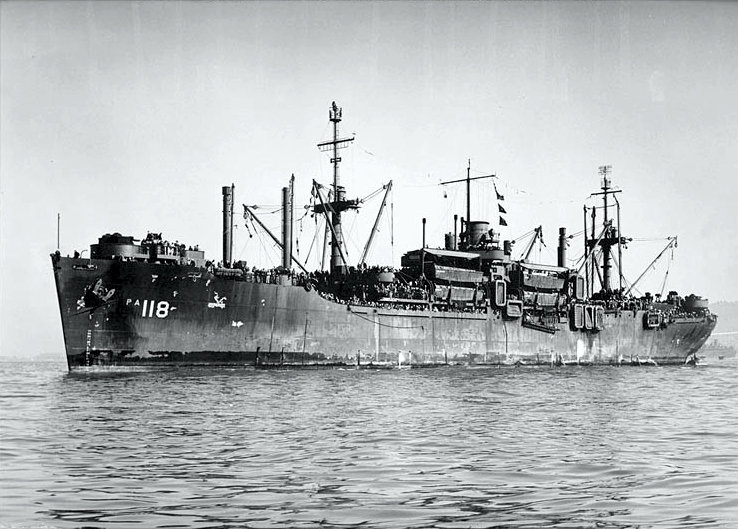
Attack transport Hendry

Rear Admiral I.N. Kiland in amphibious command ship Mount McKinley
Embarking 77th Infantry ("Statue of Liberty") Division and one Marine BLT (Maj. Gen. Andrew D. Bruce, USA)

Transport Group "Fox"
Commodore T.B. Brittain

Transport Division 49

4 attack transports: Chilton, LaGrange, Tazewell, St. Mary's
2 attack cargos: Oberon, Torrance

Transport Division 50

4 attack transports: Henrico, Pitt, Natrona, Drew
1 attack cargo: Tate
1 evacuation transport: Rixey

Transport Division 51

5 attack transports: Goodhue, Eastland, Telfair, Mountrail, Montrose
2 attack cargos: Wyandot, Suffolk

Reconnaissance section

2 destroyer transports: Scribner, Kinzer

Western Islands Tractor Flotilla: 18 LSTs
Western Islands Reserve Tractor Group: 10 LSTs
Western Islands LSM Group: 11 LSMs
Western Islands Control Unit: 7 submarine chasers: (3 steel hull, 4 wooden hull)
Western Islands Support Craft Flotilla

Mortar support divisions 6, 7, 8
RCM and Rocket Division 3
Gunboat Support Divisions 1, 3, 4, 5
LSM(R) Group

Western Islands Hydrographic Survey Group: 4 submarine chasers (steel hull)
Western Island Service & Salvage Unit

1 salvage vessel: Clamp
1 landing craft repair ship: Egeria
2 fleet tugs: Yuma, Tekesta
2 LCI(L)s
1 LCT

Screen
Captain Frederick Moosbrugger in amphibious command ship Biscayne

8 destroyers

8 Fletcher-class (5 × 5-in. main battery): Picking, Sproston, Wickes, William D. Porter (sunk by kamikaze 10 Jun) Isherwood, Kimberly, Luce, Charles J. Badger

6 destroyer escorts

3 John C. Butler-class (2 × 5-in. main battery): Richard W. Suesens, Abercrombie, Oberrender
3 Cannon-class (3 × 3-in. main battery): Riddle, Swearer, Stern

3 destroyer transports: Humphreys, Herbert, Dickerson (scuttled 4 April following kamikaze attack on 2 Apr)

Demonstration Group "Charlie" (Task Group 51.2)
Rear Admiral Jerauld Wright
Embarking Demonstration Landing Force (2nd Marine Division), Major General Thomas E. Watson, USMC

Transport Squadron 15

5 attack transports: Bayfield, Mellette, Hendry, Sibley, Berrien
3 attack cargos: Shoshone, Theenim, Southampton
1 evacuation transport: Pinkney

=== Northern Attack Force (Task Force 53) ===
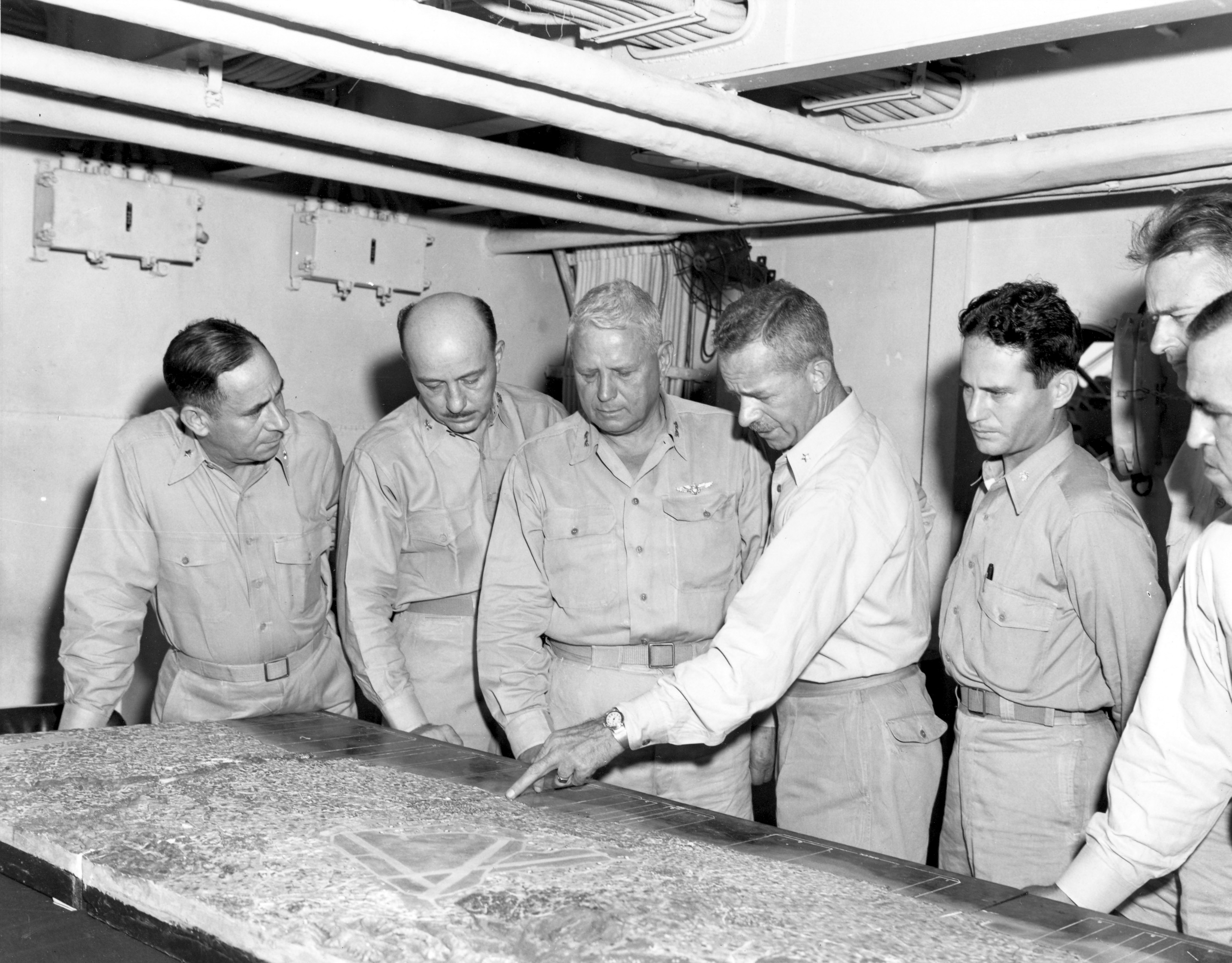
Maj. Gen. Roy S. Geiger (third from left) and his staff planning the Marine Corps phase of the invasion of Okinawa. Chief of Staff Silverthorn is gesturing toward the map.

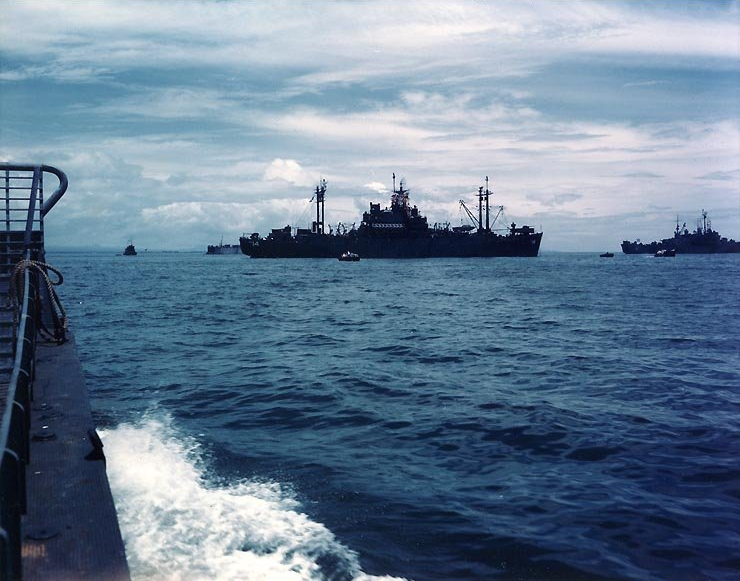
Catskill-class vehicle landing ship at Subic Bay, 1945

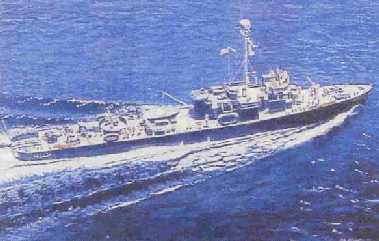
Steel-hulled sub chaser

Rear Admiral Lawrence F. Reifsnider in amphibious command ship Panamint
Embarking III Amphibious Corps (Maj. Gen. Roy S. Geiger, USMC)

Transport Group "Able" (Task Group 53.1)
Commodore H.B. Knowles
Embarking 6th Marine Division (Maj. Gen. Lemuel C. Shepherd, Jr., USMC)

Transport Division 34

6 attack transports: Cambria, Marvin H. McIntyre, Adair, Gage, Noble, Gilliam
2 attack cargos: Sheliak, Hydrus

Transport Division 35

5 attack transports: Clay, Leon, George Clymer, Arthur Middleton, Catron
2 attack cargos: Caswell, Devosa

Transport Division 36

5 attack transports: Monrovia, Wayne, Sumter, Menifee, Fuller
3 attack cargos: Aquarius, Circe, Casa Grande
1 vehicle landing ship: Catskill

Transport Group "Baker" (Task Group 53.2)
Commodore J. G. Moyer
Embarking 1st Marine Division (Maj. Gen. Pedro A. del Valle, USMC)

Transport Division 52

8 attack transports: Burleigh, McCracken, Thomas Jefferson, Charles Carroll, Barnett, Andromeda, Cepheus, Oak Hill
1 vehicle landing ship: Monitor

Transport Division 53

5 attack transports: Marathon, Rawlins, Renville, New Kent, Burleson
2 attack cargos: Centaurus, Arcturus

Transport Division 54

5 attack transports: Dade, Magoffin, Navarro, Effingham, Joseph T. Dickman
3 attack cargos: Betelgeuse, Procyon, White Marsh

Northern Tractor Flotilla (Task Group 53.3)
Capt. J. S. Laidlaw

Tractor Group "Able": 16 LSTs carrying 6 LCTs, 22 pontoon barges and 6 pontoon causeways; 7 LSMs
Tractor Group "Baker": 16 LSTs carrying 10 LCTs, 16 pontoon barges and 6 pontoon causeways
Tractor Group "Charlie": 14 LSTs carrying 20 pontoon barges; 8 LSMs
Northern Control Group: 18 submarine chasers (4 steel hull, 9 wooden hull, 5 sweeper type), Northern Beach Party

Northern Attack Force Screen (Task Group 53.6)
Captain J. H. Wellings

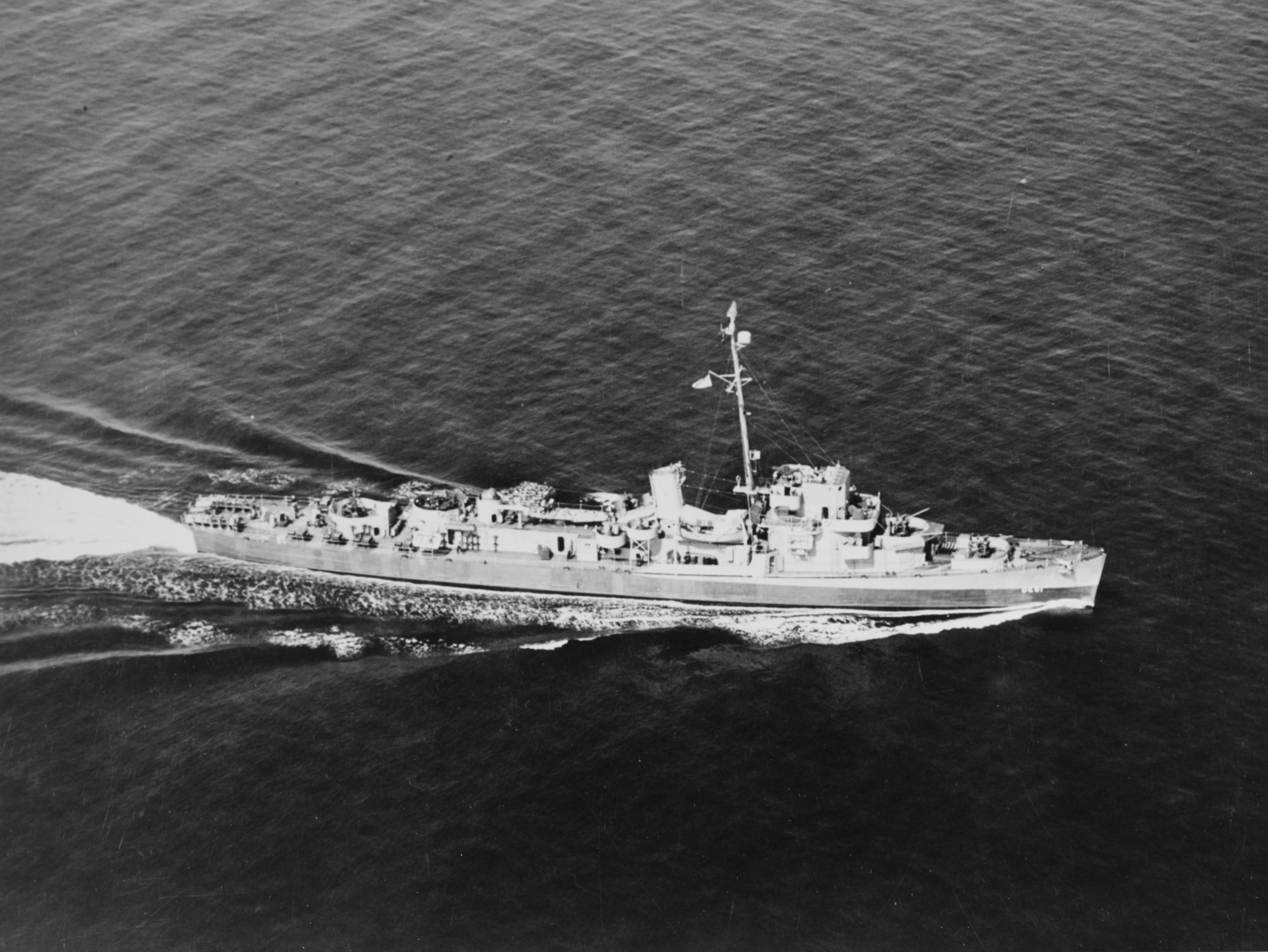
Buckley-class destroyer escort

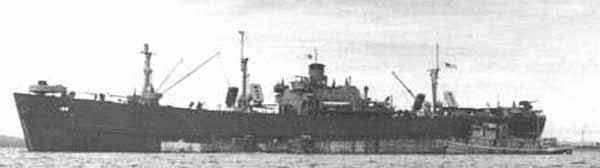
Armadillo-class oil storage ship

13 destroyers

2 Allen M. Sumner-class (6 × 5-in. main battery): Massey, Hugh W. Hadley
4 Fletcher-class (5 × 5-in. main battery): Pringle (sunk by kamikaze 16 Apr), Hutchins, Stanly, Howorth
4 Benham-class (4 × 5-in. main battery): Lang, Stack, Sterett, Wilson
3 Sims-class (5 × 5-in. main battery): Morris, Mustin, Russell

5 destroyer escorts

4 Buckley-class (3 × 3-in. main battery): Gendreau, Fieberling, William C. Cole, Paul G. Baker
1 Evarts-class (3 × 3-in. main battery): Bebas

2 destroyer transports: Charles Lawrence, Roper
3 submarine chasers (2 escort type, 1 wooden hull)

Northern Defense Group (Task Group 53.7)
Capt. W. W. Weeden
Embarking Marine Corps support units and high priority cargo: 21 LSTs carrying LCT and pontoon causeways

2 oil storage ships: Elk, Camel
1 Evarts-class (3 × 3-in. main battery) destroyer escort: Fair
2 submarine chasers (wooden hull), 7 motor minesweepers

=== Southern Attack Force (Task Force 55) ===
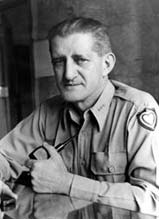
Maj. Gen. John R. Hodge

Attack cargo ship Algorab

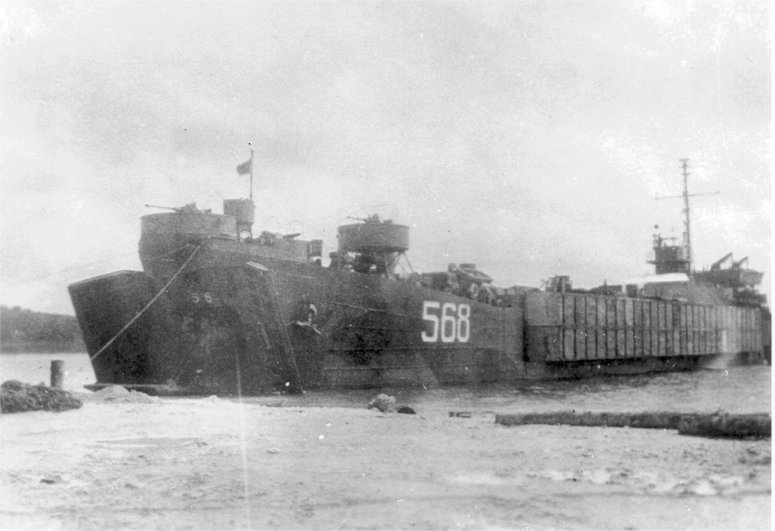
Landing ship, tank (LST)

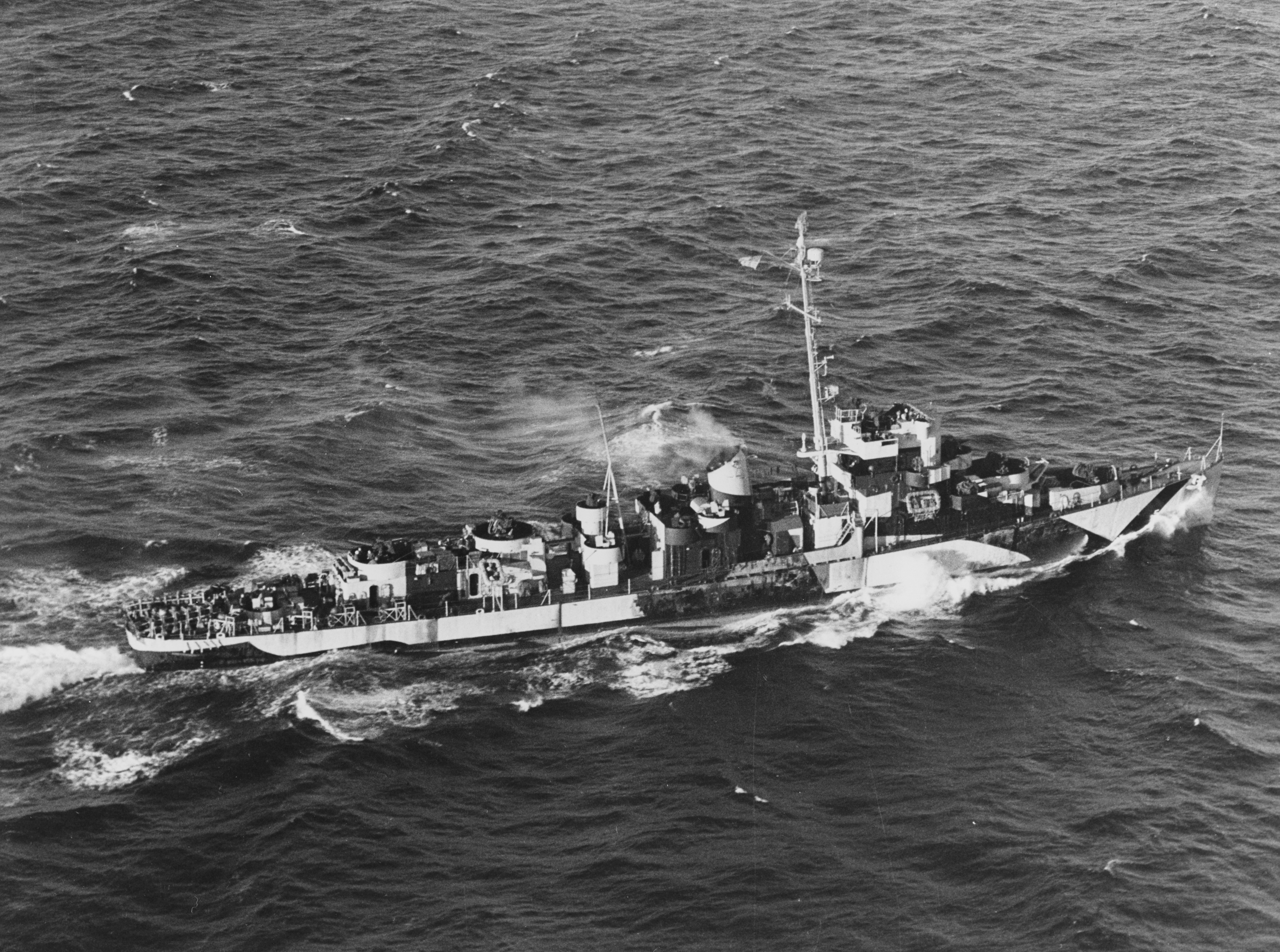
Evarts-class destroyer escort

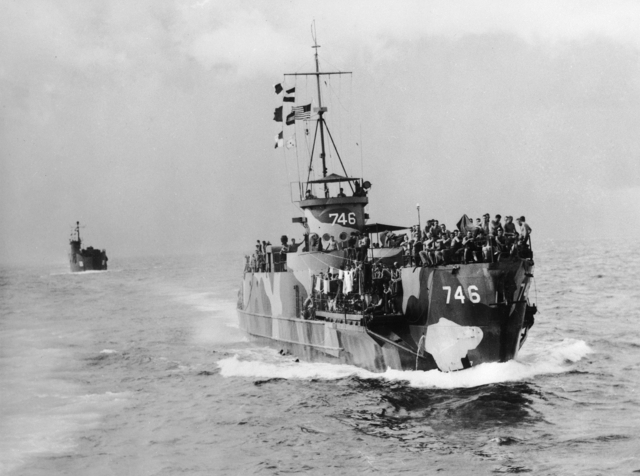
Landing craft, infantry (LCIs)

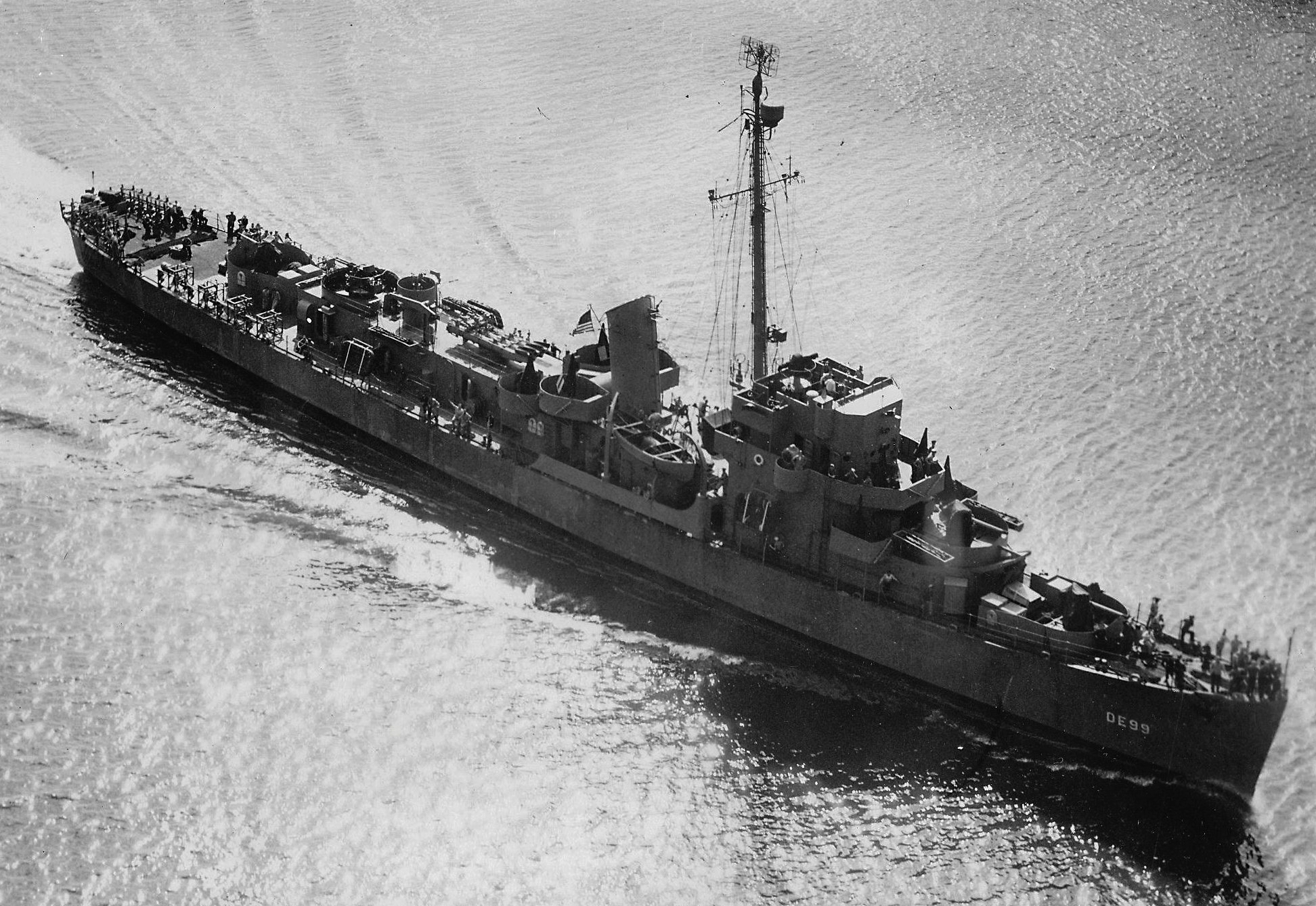
Cannon-class destroyer escort

Rear Admiral John L. Hall in amphibious command ship Teton

Embarking XXIV Army Corps (Maj. Gen. John R. Hodge)

Transport Group "Dog" (Task Group 55.1) (Commodore M.O. Carlson)

Embarking 7th Infantry ("Bayonet") Division (Maj. Gen. Archibald V. Arnold, USA)

- Transport Division 37
  - 4 attack transports: Harris, Lamar, Sheridan, Pierce
  - 1 attack cargo: Algorab
- Transport Division 38
  - 4 attack transports: Barnstable, Elmore, Alpine, Lycoming
  - 1 attack cargo: Alshain
  - 1 landing ship dock: Epping Forest
- Transport Division 39
  - 4 attack transports: Custer, Freestone, Kittson, Baxter
  - 2 attack cargos: Algol, Arneb
- Transport Division 13
  - 4 attack transports: Appling, Butte, Audrain, Laurens
  - 2 attack cargos: Aurelia, Corvus
  - 1 vehicle landing ship: Ozark
- Tractor Group "Dog"
  - 16 landing ship tank (LST), 12 landing ship medium (LSM), 2 landing craft infantry (LCI)
- Tractor Group "Fox"
  - 14 LSTs carrying LCTs and pontoon barges,
  - 10 LSM

Transport Group "Easy" (Task Group 55.2) (Commodore C.G. Richardson)

Embarking 96th Infantry ("Deadeye") Division (Maj. Gen. James L. Bradley, USA)

- Transport Division 40
  - 4 attack transports: Mendocino, Sarasota, Haskell, Oconto
  - 2 attack cargos: Capricornus, Chara
  - 1 landing ship dock: Lindenwald
- Transport Division 41
  - 4 attack transports: Olmstead, La Porte, Fond du Lac, Banner
  - 2 attack cargos: Diphda, Uvalde
- Transport Division 42
  - 4 attack transports: Neshoba, Oxford, Latimer, Edgecombe
  - 1 attack cargo: Virgo
  - 1 landing ship dock: Gunston Hall
- Transport Division 14
  - 4 attack transports: Allendale, Meriwether, Menard, Kenton
  - 1 attack cargo: Achernar
  - Tractor Group "Easy": 23 LSTs, 5 LSMs
  - Beach Party "Easy", Southern Beach Party
  - 15 submarine chasers: 4 steel hull, 7 wooden hull, 4 sweeper type
  - 17 Landing Craft Support (large) [LCS(L)], 6 Landing Ship Medium (rocket) [LSM(R)s]

Screen (Task Group 55.6) (Captain E.W. Young)

- Destroyers (13)
  - 4 Allen M. Sumner-class (6 × 5-in. main battery): Hyman, Purdy, Wadsworth, Putnam
  - 9 Fletcher-class (5 × 5-in. main battery): Anthony, Bache, Bush (Note: sunk by kamikaze 6 April), Mullany, Bennett, Hudson, Beale, Ammen, Rooks
- Destroyer escorts (6)
  - 2 Evarts-class (3 × 3-in. main battery): Crouter, Carlson,
  - 2 Buckley-class (3 × 3-in. main battery): Damon M. Cummings, Vammen
  - 1 Cannon-class (3 × 3-in. main battery): O'Neill
  - 1 John C. Butler-class (2 × 5-in. main battery): Walter C. Wann
- 1 destroyer transport
  - Sims

Southern Defense Group (Task Group 55.7) (Commander B.T. Zelenka)

- 1 Evarts-class destroyer escort: Manlove
- 1 destroyer transport: Stringham
- 34 LSTs, 14 LSMs, 6 motor minesweepers, 2 LCIs
- 1 oil storage ship: Grumium

=== Expeditionary Troops (Task Force 56) ===
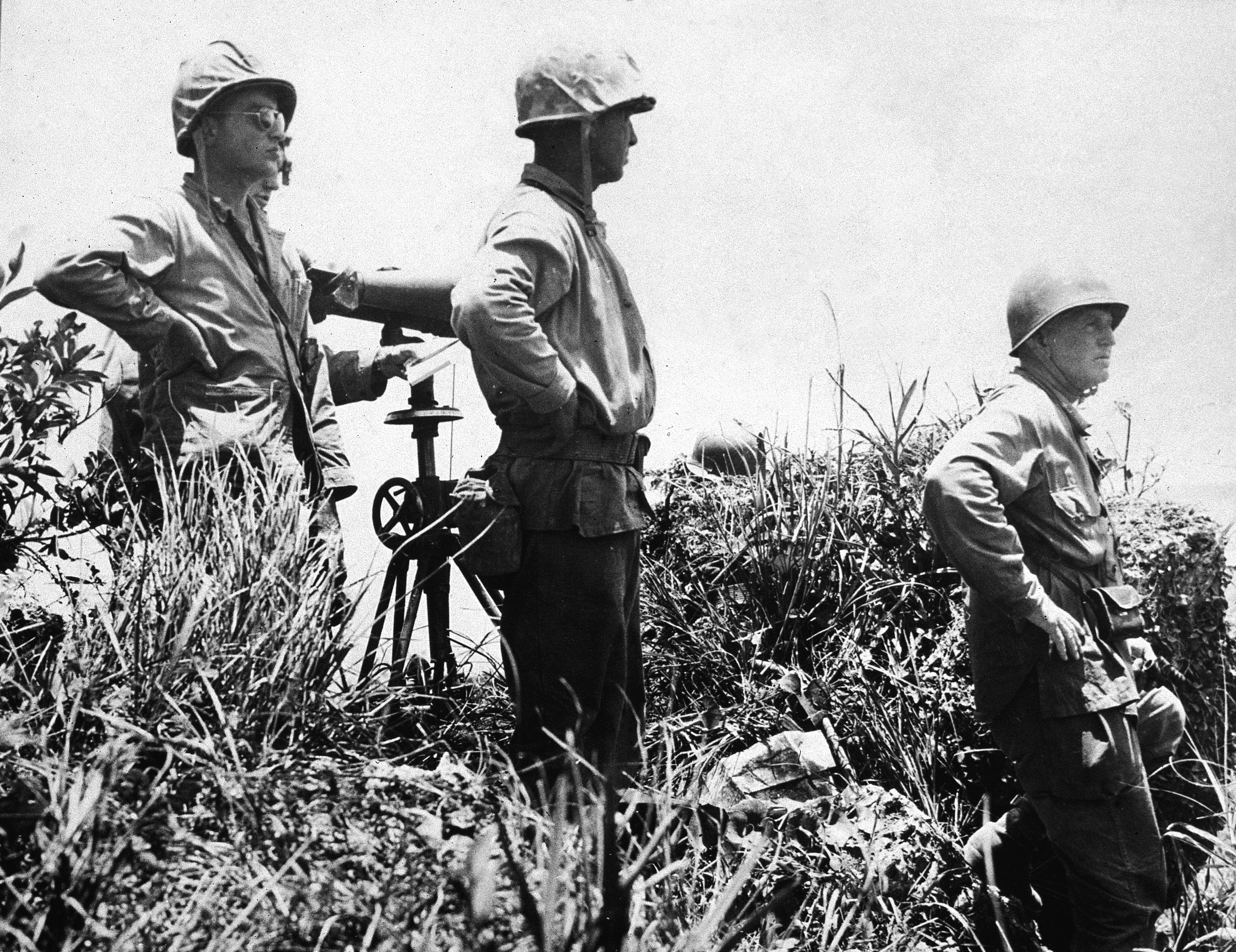
Final photograph of Lt. Gen. Simon B. Buckner, Jr. (right), shortly before his death by artillery fire on Okinawa

Lieutenant General Simon Bolivar Buckner, Jr., USA (KIA 18 June)
Consisting of United States Tenth Army

Northern Landing Area

III Amphibious Corps (Embarked in Task Force 53)
Maj. Gen. Roy S. Geiger, USMC

Left beaches: 6th Marine Division (Maj. Gen. Lemuel C. Shepherd, Jr., USMC)
Right beaches: 1st Marine Division (Maj. Gen. Pedro A. del Valle, USMC)

Southern Landing Area

XXIV Army Corps (Embarked in Task Force 55)
Maj. Gen. John R. Hodge, USA

Left beaches: 7th Infantry ("Bayonet") Division (Maj. Gen. Archibald V. Arnold, USA)
Right beaches: 96th Infantry ("Deadeye") Division (Maj. Gen. James L. Bradley, USA)
Landed L+8: 27th Infantry ("New York") Division (Maj. Gen. George W. Griner, Jr., USA)

Western Islands

Landed L+26: 77th Infantry ("Statue of Liberty") Division and one Marine BLT (Maj. Gen. Andrew D. Bruce, USA)

== Allied combat ships ==
=== Amphibious Support Forces (Task Force 52) ===
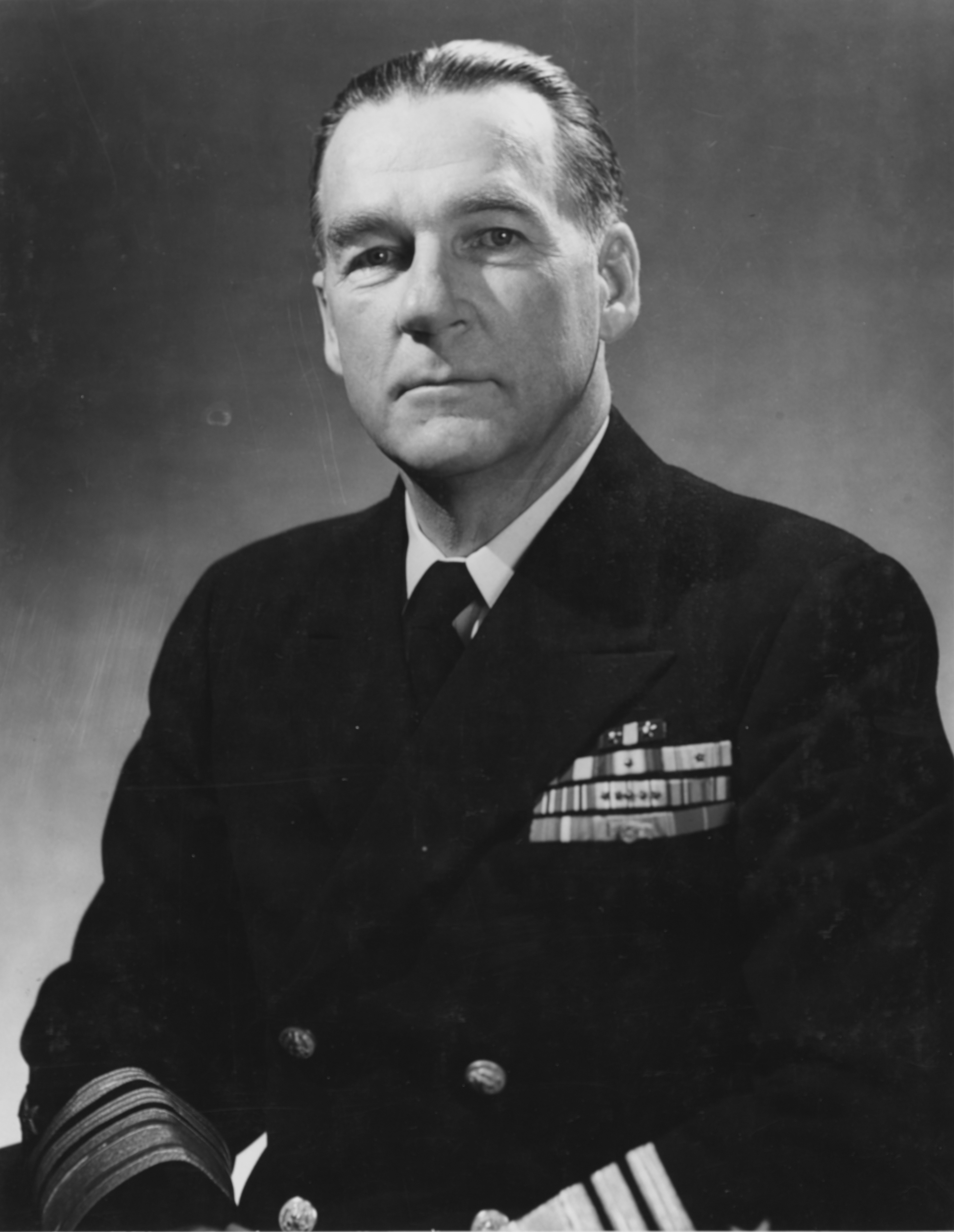
Rear Adm. William H.P. Blandy

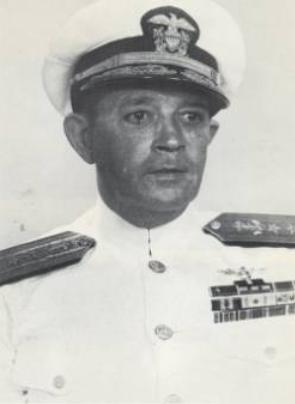
Rear Adm. Clifton A.F. Sprague

Rear Admiral William H.P. Blandy in amphibious command ship Estes

Escort carrier Savo Island

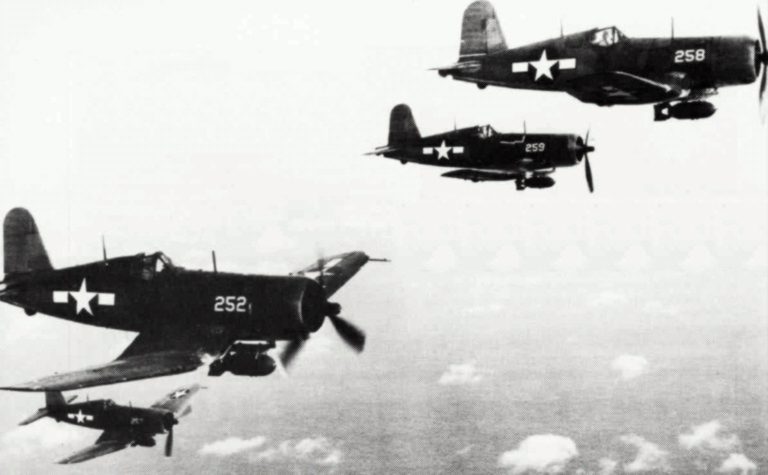
Marine Corps Corsairs in 1944

Support Carrier Group (Task Group 52.1)
Rear Admiral Calvin T. Durgin

Unit One

Rear Admiral Clifton Sprague

- 7 escort carriers
  - Makin Island (Capts. W.B. Whaley and I.E. Hobbs)
    - VC-84 (Lt. D.K. English, USNR), 27 aircraft
    - 16 FM-2 Wildcat fighters
    - 11 TBM Avenger torpedo bombers
  - Fanshaw Bay (Capt. M.E. Arnold)
    - VOC-2 (Lt. Cmdr. R.M. Allison), 30 aircraft
    - 24 FM-2 Wildcat fighters
    - 6 TBM Avenger torpedo bombers
  - Lunga Point (Capt. G.A.T. Washburn)
    - VC-85 (Lt. Cmdr. F.C. Herriman), 30 aircraft
    - 18 FM-2 Wildcat fighters
    - 12 TBM Avenger torpedo bombers
  - Sangamon (Capts. M.E. Browder and A.I. Malstrom)
    - Air Group 33 (Cmdr. F.B. Gilkeson), 30 aircraft
    - 24 F6F Hellcat fighters
    - 6 TBM Avenger torpedo bombers
  - Natoma Bay (Capts. Albert K. Morehouse and B.B. Nichol)
    - VC-81 (Lt. Cmdr. W.B. Morton, USNR), 32 aircraft
    - 20 FM-2 Wildcat fighters
    - 12 TBM Avenger torpedo bombers
  - Savo Island (Capt. W.D. Anderson)
    - VC-91 (Lt. F.M. Blanchard, USNR), 35 aircraft
    - 20 FM-2 Wildcat fighters
    - 15 TBM Avenger torpedo bombers
  - Anzio (Capt. G.C. Montgomery)
    - VC-13 (Lt. Cmdr. R.P. Williams, USNR), 24 aircraft
    - 12 FM-2 Wildcat fighters
    - 12 TBM Avenger torpedo bombers
- Screen (Commander J.C. Zahm),
  - 6 destroyers
    - 1 Allen M. Sumner-class (6 × 5-in. main battery): Ingraham
    - 3 Fletcher-class (5 × 5-in. main battery): Boyd, Bradford, Hart
    - 2 Bagley-class (4 × 5-in. main battery): Bagley, Patterson
  - 11 destroyer escorts
    - 9 John C. Butler-class (2 × 5-in. main battery): Lawrence C. Taylor, Melvin R. Nawman, Oliver Mitchell, Robert F. Keller, Tabberer, Richard M. Rowell, Richard S. Bull, Dennis, O'Flaherty
    - 2 Evarts-class (3 × 3-in. main battery): Sederstrom, Fleming

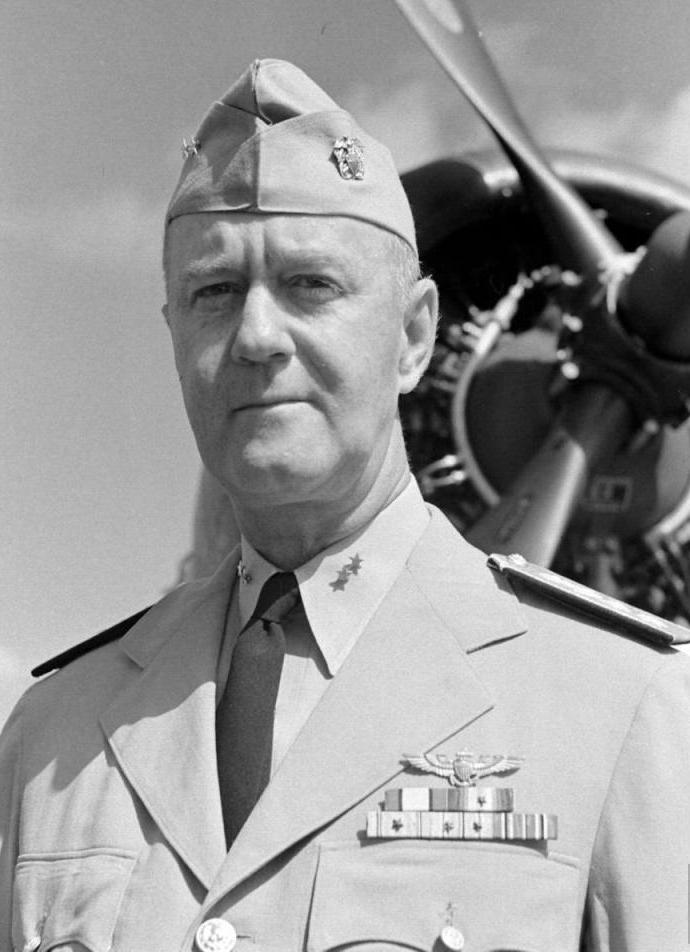
Rear Admiral Felix B. Stump

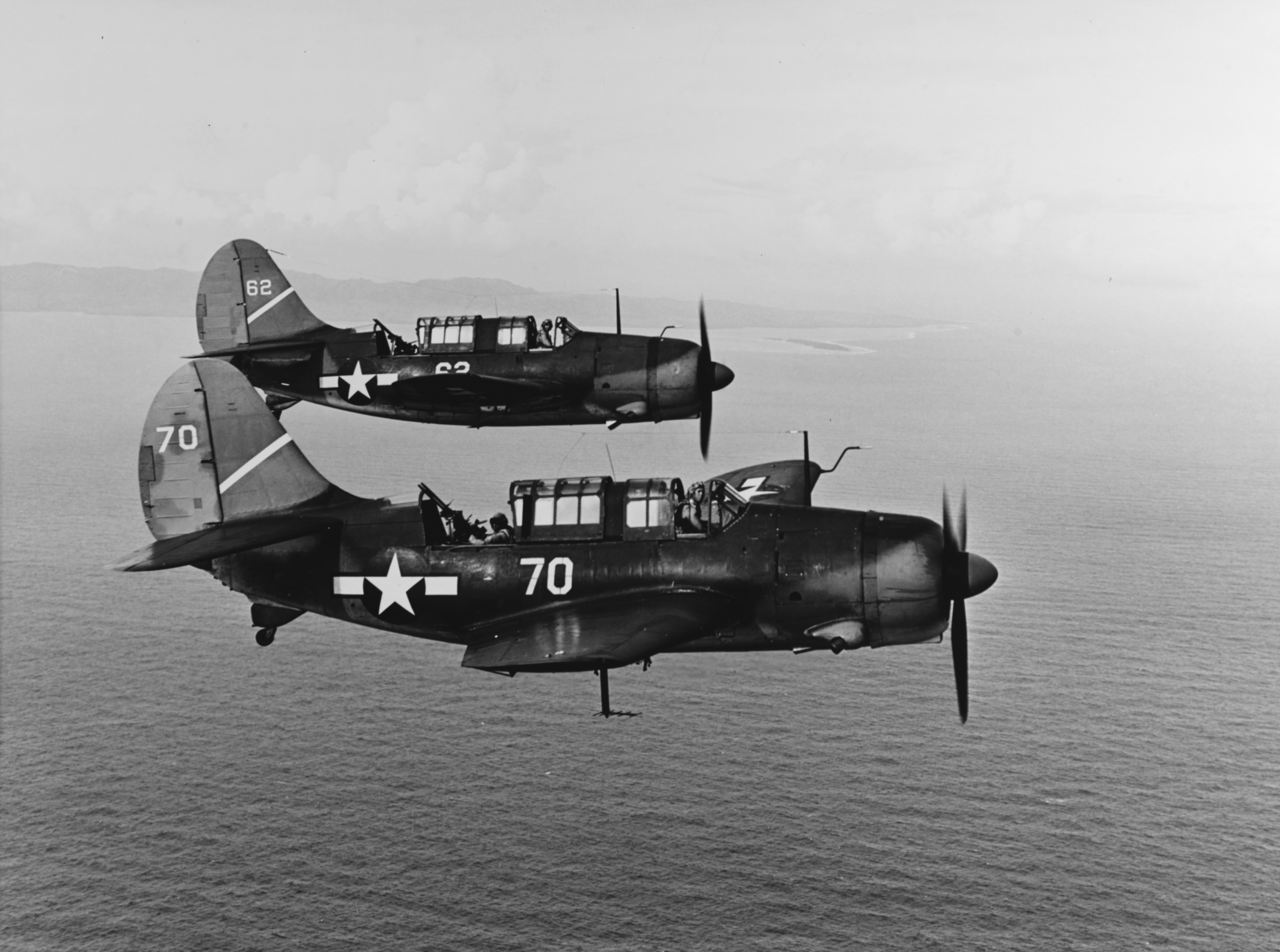
Curtiss SB2C Helldiver dive bombers

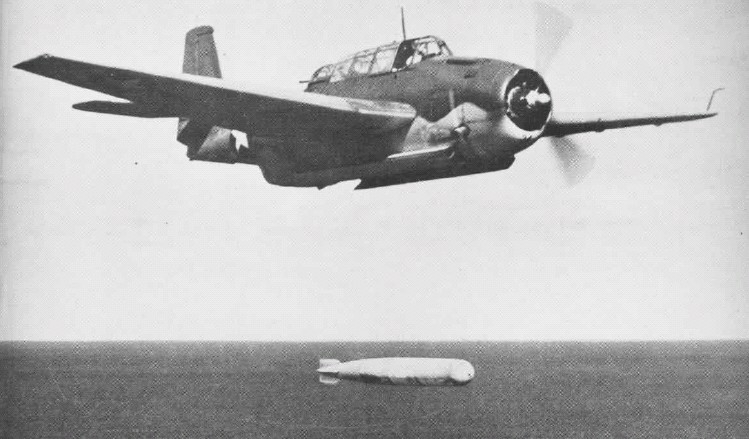
Grumman TBF Avenger torpedo bomber

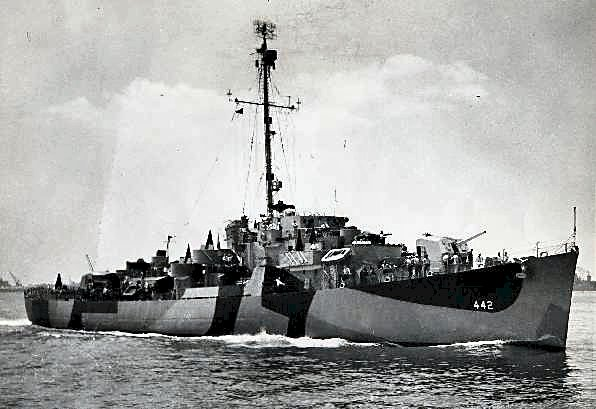
Destroyer escort Ulvert M. Moore, commanded by Lt. Cmdr. Franklin D. Roosevelt, Jr.

Unit Two

Rear Admiral Felix B. Stump, 7 escort carriers

- Saginaw Bay (Capts. F.C. Sutton and Robert Goldwaite)
  - VC-88 (Lt. E.L. Kemp, USNR), 32 aircraft
  - 20 FM-2 Wildcat fighters
  - 12 TBM Avenger torpedo bombers
- Sargent Bay (Capt. R.M. Oliver)
  - VC-83 (Lt. Cmdr. B.V. Gates (KIA) and Lt. M.S. Worley, USNR), 28 aircraft
  - 16 FM-2 Wildcat fighters
  - 12 TBM Avenger torpedo bombers
- Rudyerd Bay (Capts. C.S. Smiley and J.G. Foster)
  - VC-96 (Lt. Cmdr. W.S. Woollen, USNR), 31 aircraft
  - 20 FM-2 Wildcat fighters
  - 11 TBM Avenger torpedo bombers
- Marcus Island (Capt. H.V. Hopkins)
  - VC-87 (Lt. H.N. Heisel), 32 aircraft
  - 20 FM-2 Wildcat fighters
  - 12 TBM Avenger torpedo bombers
- Petrof Bay (Capt. R.S. Clarke)
  - VC-93 (Lt. Cmdr. C.P. Smith), 28 aircraft
  - 16 FM-2 Wildcat fighters
  - 12 TBM Avenger torpedo bombers
- Tulagi (Capts. J.C. Cronin & W.V. Davis)
  - VC-92 (Lt. Cmdr. J.B. Wallace), 31 aircraft
  - 19 FM-2 Wildcat fighters
  - 12 TBM Avenger torpedo bombers
- Wake Island (Capt. A.V. Magly)
  - VOC-1 (Lt. Cmdr. W.F. Bringie), 32 aircraft
  - 26 FM-2 Wildcat fighters
  - 6 TBM Avenger torpedo bombers

Screen (Captain G.P. Hunter)

- 4 destroyers
  - 1 Allen M. Sumner-class (6 × 5-in. main battery): Lowry
  - 3 Fletcher-class (5 × 5-in. main battery): Capps, Evans, John D. Henley
- 6 destroyer escorts
  - 4 John C. Butler-class (2 × 5-in. main battery): William Seiverling, Ulvert M. Moore (Lt. Cmdr. Franklin D. Roosevelt Jr., USNR), Kendall C. Campbell, Goss
  - 2 Evarts-class (3 × 3-in. main battery): Tisdale, Eisele

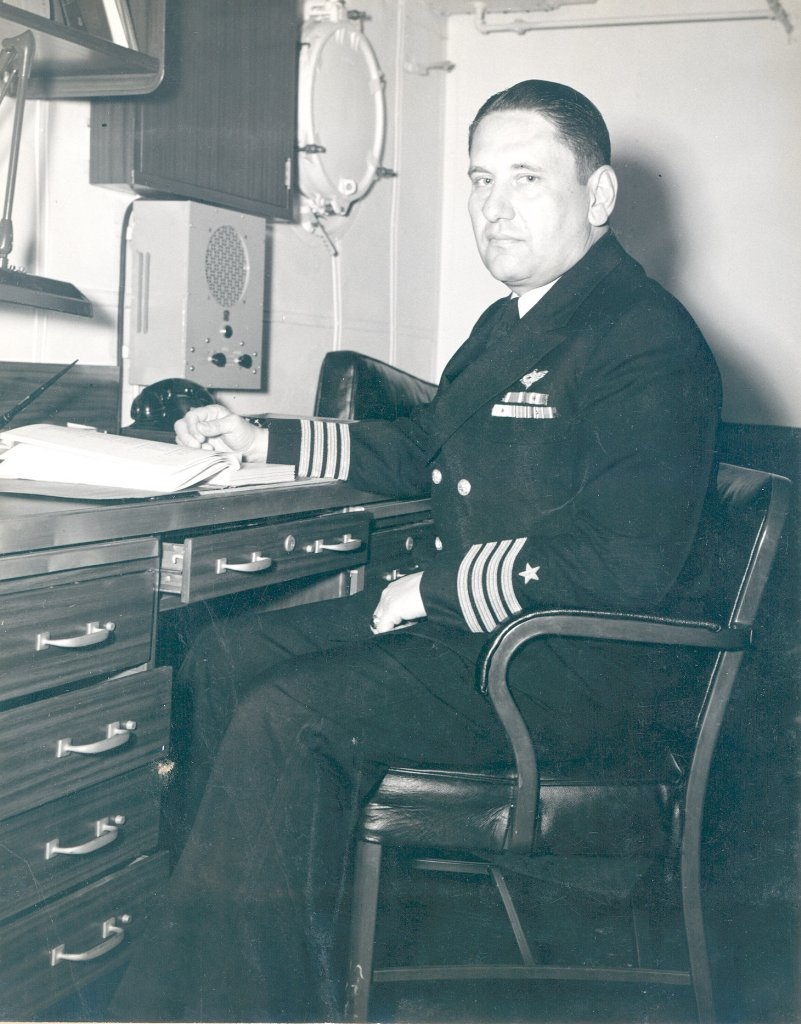
Rear Adm. William D. Sample

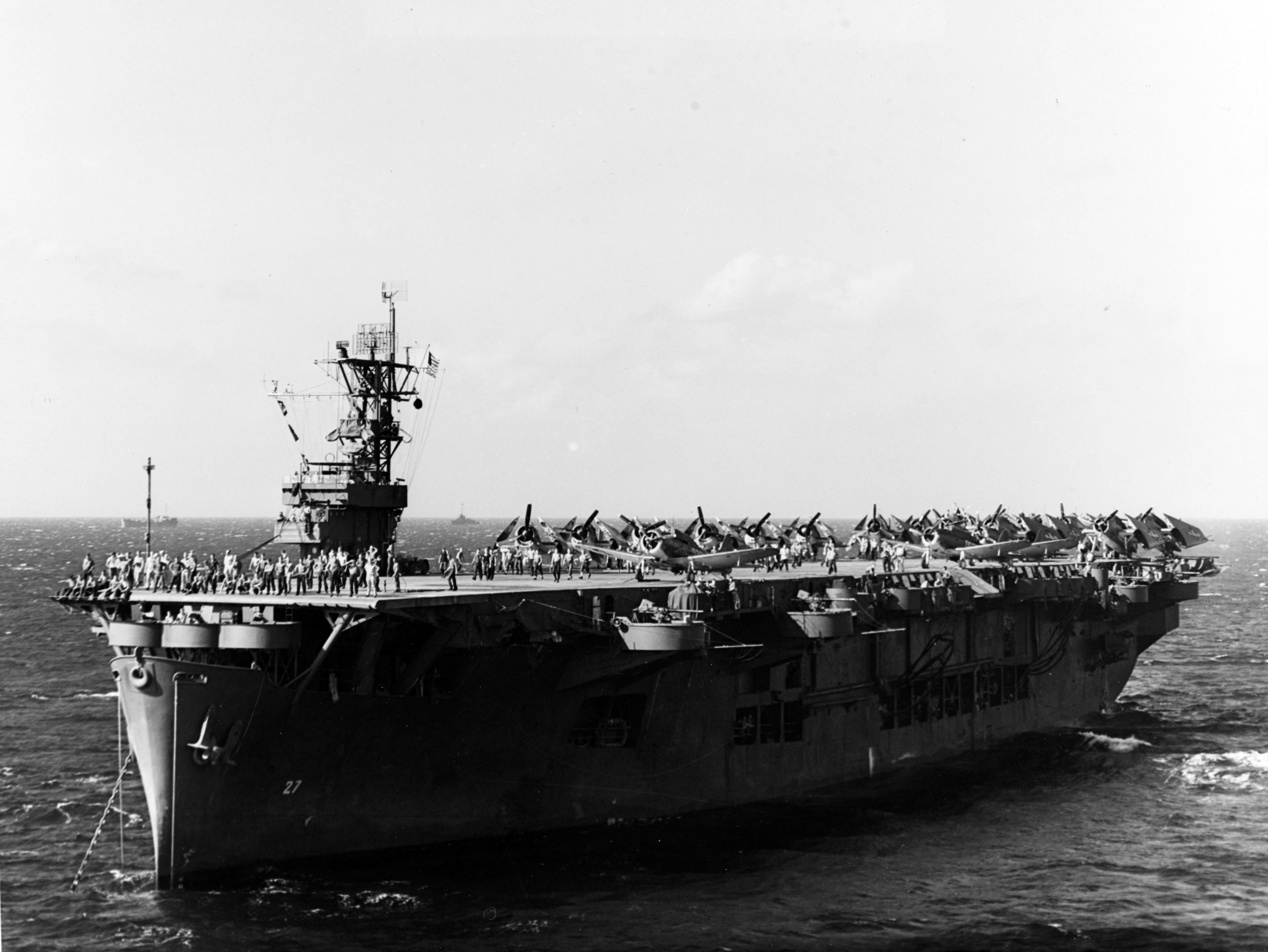
Escort carrier Suwannee at Kwajalein, 1944

Unit Three

Rear Admiral William Sample (4 escort carriers)

- Suwannee (Capt. D.S. Cornwell)
  - Air Group 40 (Lt. Cmdr. R.D. Sampson (KIA) and Lt. Cmdr. J.C. Longino), 27 aircraft
  - 17 F6F Hellcat fighters
  - 10 TBM Avenger torpedo bombers
- Chenango (Capts. George van Deurs and Harry D. Felt)
  - Air Group 25 (Lt. Cmdr. R.W. Robinson (KIA), Lt. B. Phillips and Lt. Cmdr. P.M. Paul), 30 aircraft
  - 18 F6F Hellcat fighters
  - 12 TBM Avenger torpedo bombers
- Santee (Capt. J.V. Peterson)
  - Air Group 24 (Lt. Cmdr. R.J. Ostrom (KIA) and Lt. P.N. Charbonnet), 30 aircraft
  - 18 F6F Hellcat fighters
  - 12 TBM Avenger torpedo bombers
- Steamer Bay (Capt. J.B. Paschal)
  - VC-90 (Lt. Cmdr. R.A. O'Neill), 31 aircraft
  - 19 FM-2 Wildcat fighters
  - 12 TBM Avenger torpedo bombers

Screen (Captain Alvin Duke Chandler)

- 5 destroyers
  - 1 Allen M. Sumner-class (6 × 5-in. main battery): Drexler
  - 3 Fletcher-class (5 × 5-in. main battery): Metcalf, Fullam, Guest
  - 1 Bagley-class (4 × 5-in. main battery): Helm
- 2 destroyer escorts
  - 2 John C. Butler-class (2 × 5-in. main battery): John C. Butler, Edmonds

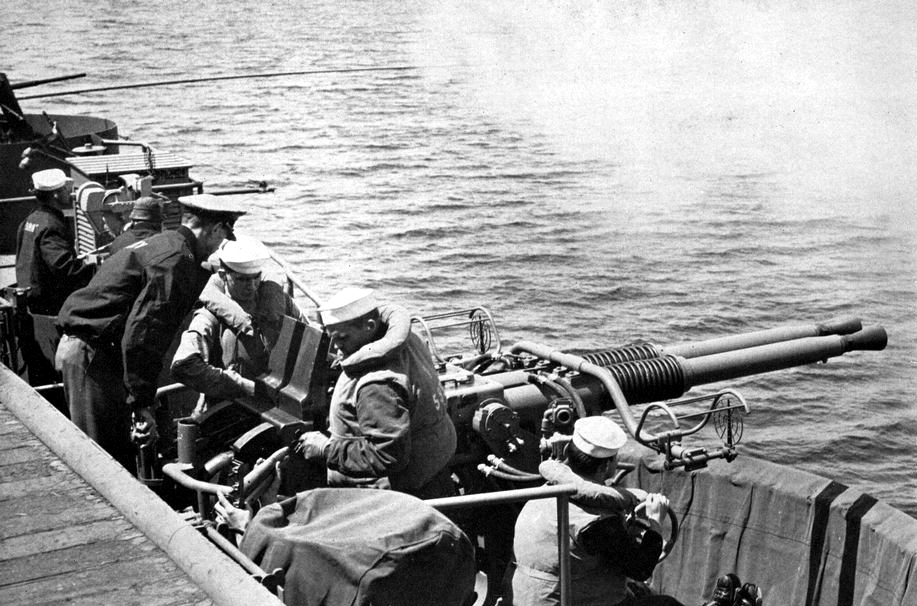
Gunnery practice aboard escort carrier Hollandia, 1944

Special Escort Carrier Group

Captain C.L. Lee (arriving 4 April)

- 4 escort carriers
  - Hollandia (Capt. Lee)
  - White Plains (Capt. D.J. Sullivan and Frederick Funke)
  - Sitkoh Bay (Capts. R.G. Lockhart and J.P. Walker)
  - Breton (Capt. Frank Obeirne)
    - Marine Air Group 31 (Col. John C. Munn, USMC)
    - Marine Air Group 33 (Col. W. E. Dickey, USMC)
      - 192 F4U Corsair and 30 F6F Hellcat fighters to operate from Okinawa airfields
- Screen (Commander R.A. Wilhelm, USNR)
  - 4 destroyer transports: Kilty, Manley, George E. Badger, Greene

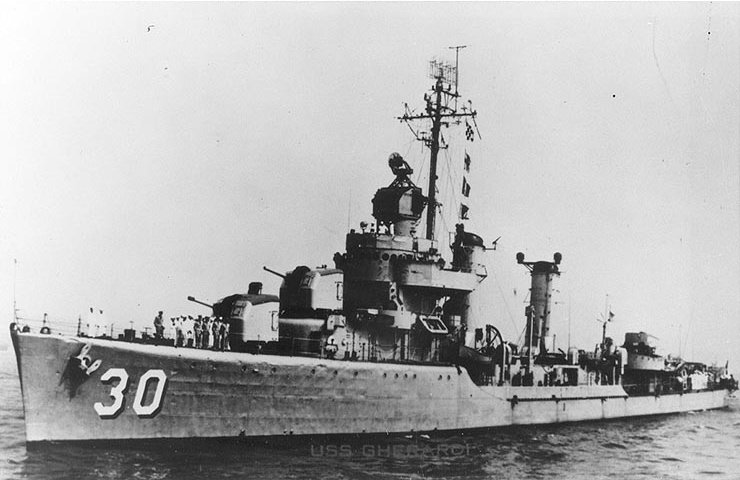
Former destroyer Gherardi in minesweeper configuration

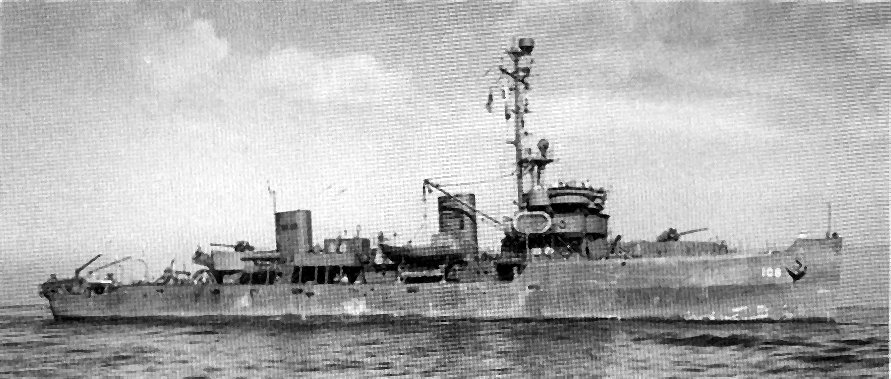
Auk-class minesweeper

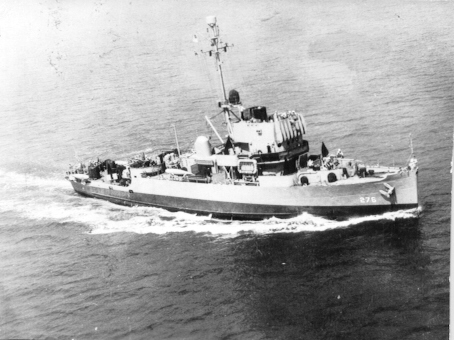
Admirable-class minesweeper

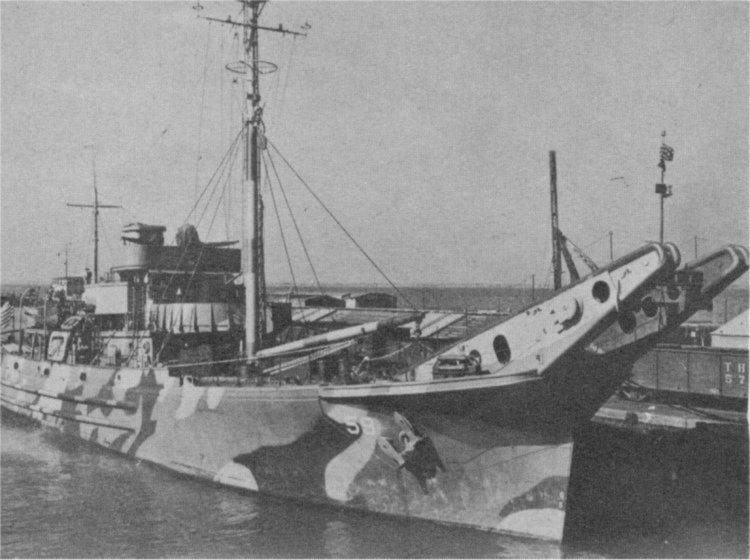
Ailanthus-class net laying ship

Mine Flotilla (Task Group 52.2)

Rear Admiral Alexander Sharp and Captain R. P. Whitemarsh in Terror

Destroyer Minesweeper Group (Task Group 52.3), Capt. R.A. Larkin

  - 13 fast minesweepers (ex-destroyers): Forrest, Hobson, Macomb, Dorsey, Hopkins, Ellyson, Hambleton, Rodman, Emmons (Note: scuttled 7 Apr following kamikaze attack 6 April), Butler, Gherardi, Jeffers, Harding
  - 3 fast minelayers (ex-destroyers): Gwin, Lindsey, Aaron Ward

Minesweeper Group One (Task Group 52.4), Captain T.F. Donohue

  - 18 Auk-class minesweepers: Champion, Heed, Defense, Devastator, Ardent, Requisite, Revenge, Pursuit, Sage, Sheldrake, Skylark (struck mine 28 Apr), Starling, Swallow (sunk by kamikaze 22 Apr), Gladiator, Impeccable, Spear, Triumph, Vigilance
  - 4 fast minelayers (ex-destroyers): Adams, Tolman, Henry A. Wiley, Shea
  - 3 submarine chasers (steel hull): PC-1128, PC-1179, PC-1598

Minesweeper Group Two (Task Group 52.5), Captain L. F. Freiburghouse

  - 18 Admirable-class minesweepers: Skirmish, Staunch, Signet, Scurry, Spectacle, Spector, Superior, Serene, Shelter, Strategy, Strength, Success, Ransom, Diploma, Density, Facility, Rebel, Recruit
  - 2 fast minelayers (ex-destroyers): Tracy, J. William Ditter
  - 3 motor gunboats (steel hull): PGM-9, PGM-10, PGM-11

Reserve Sweep Group (Task Group 52.7)
Cmdrs. E.D. McEathron and J.W. Wyckoff

- 6 Admirable-class minesweepers: Buoyant, Gayety, Design, Device, Hazard, Execute
- Reinforced in May with:
  - 2 Admirable-class minesweepers: Fixity, Dour
  - 8 Auk-class minesweepers: Chief, Competent, Token, Zeal, Strive, Oracle, Velocity, Prevail
- 14 motor minesweepers
- 4 destroyer transports with sweep gear-equipped landing craft personnel, ramped (LCP(R)s) embarked: Reeves, Daniel T. Griffin, Waters, Sims
- 2 minelayers: Weehawken, Monadnock
- 1 repair ship: Mona Island

Net and Buoy Group (Task Group 52.8), Cmdr. G. C. King, USNR

- 9 Ailanthus-class net laying ships: Snowbell, Terebinth, Corkwood, Spicewood, Cliffrose, Stagbush, Abele, Winterberry, Pinon
- 3 Aloe-class net laying ships: Mahogany, Aloe, Chinquapin
- 1 mine and net laying ship: Keokuk
- 2 net cargo ships: Sagittarius, Tuscana

=== Gunfire and Covering Force (Task Force 54) ===
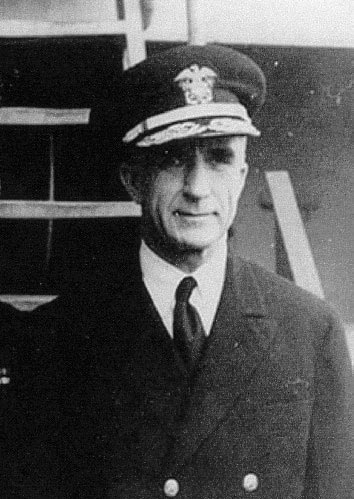
Rear Adm. Morton L. Deyo

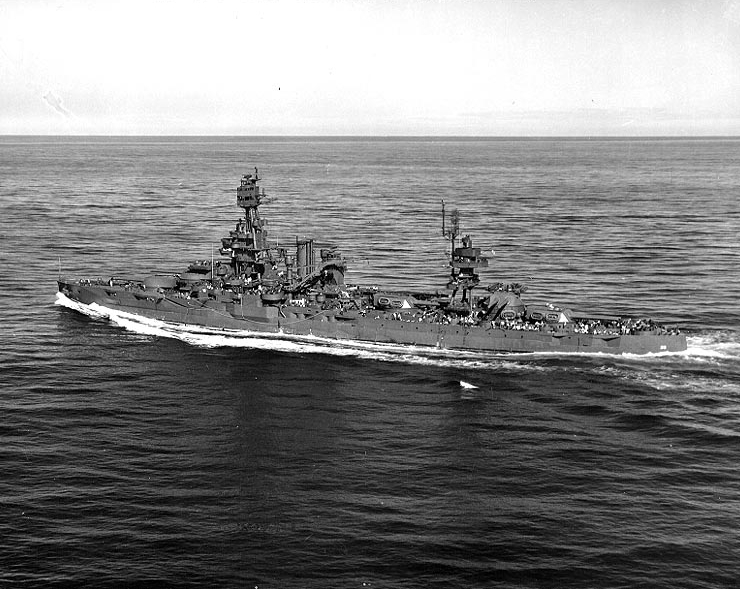
Battleship Texas in Hawaiian waters in 1945

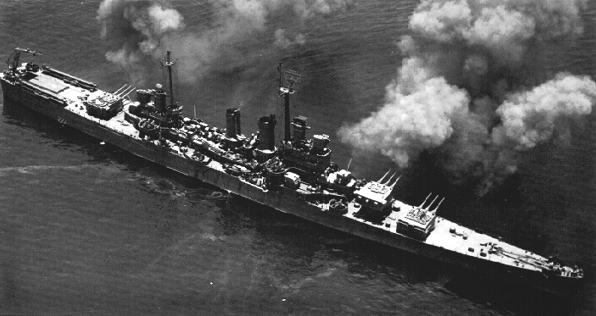
Heavy cruiser Wichita firing broadside in 1944

Rear Admiral Morton L. Deyo in battleship Tennessee

Unit One (Rear Admiral Peter K. Fischler)

- 2 battleships: Texas, Maryland
- 1 heavy cruiser: Tuscaloosa
- 4 Fletcher-class destroyers: Laws, Longshaw, Morrison, Prichett

Unit Two (Rear Admiral C. Turner Joy)

- 2 battleships: Arkansas, Colorado
- 2 heavy cruisers: San Francisco, Minneapolis
- 3 Fletcher-class destroyers: Halligan (Note: struck mine 26 March), Paul Hamilton, Twiggs (Note: sunk by kamikaze 16 June)
- 1 Allen M. Sumner-class destroyer: Laffey

Unit Three (Rear Admiral Bertram J. Rodgers)

- 2 battleships: Tennessee, Nevada
- 1 heavy cruiser: Wichita
- 2 light cruisers: Birmingham, St. Louis
- 4 Allen M. Sumner-class destroyers: Mannert L. Abele (Note: sunk by kamikaze 12 April), Zellars, Barton, O'Brien
- 1 Fletcher-class destroyer: Bryant

Unit Four (Rear Admiral Lynde D. McCormick)

- 2 battleships: Idaho, West Virginia
- 2 heavy cruisers: Pensacola, Portland
- 1 light cruiser: Biloxi
- * 5 Fletcher-class destroyers: Porterfield, Callaghan (Note: sunk by kamikaze 28 July), Irwin, Cassin Young, Preston

Unit Five (Rear Admiral Allan E. Smith)

- Battleship Division 3 (George L. Weyler): 2 battleships: New Mexico, New York
- Cruiser Division 5 (Allan E. Smith): 2 heavy cruisers: Salt Lake City, Indianapolis
- Destroyer Squadron 56 (Roland N. Smoot): 5 Fletcher-class destroyers: Newcomb, Heywood L. Edwards, Richard P. Leary, Bennion, Leutze

Unit Six (Commander W.B. Hinds, USNR)

- 2 Cannon-class destroyer escorts: Samuel S. Miles, Wesson
- 6 Buckley-class destroyer escorts: Foreman, Whitehurst, England, Witter, Bowers, Willmarth

Reported to TF 54 after L-day

- 1 battleship: Mississippi
- 1 heavy cruiser: New Orleans
- 1 Fletcher-class destroyer: Daly
- 1 fast minesweeper: Forrest

=== British Carrier Force (Task Force 57) ===
Royal Navy admirals

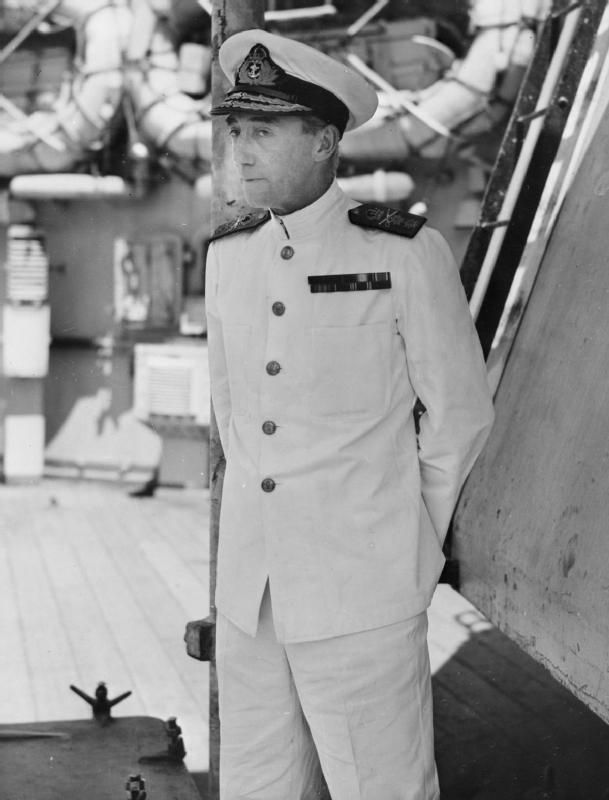
Vice Adm. Sir Bernard Rawlings, RN

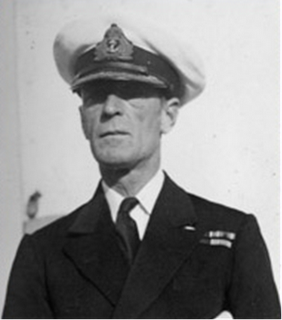
Rear Adm. Sir Philip L. Vian, RN

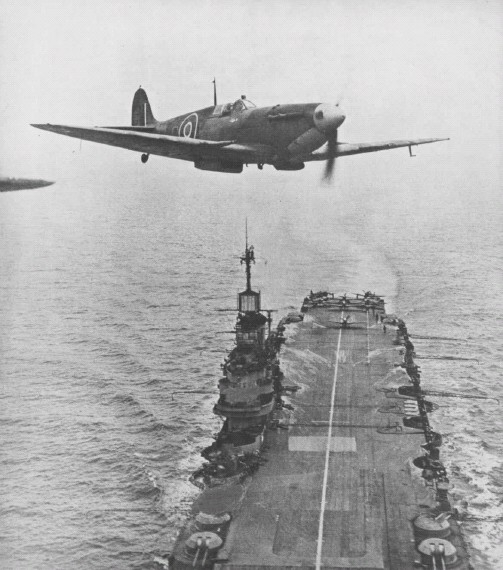
Supermarine Seafire fighter flies over a British carrier

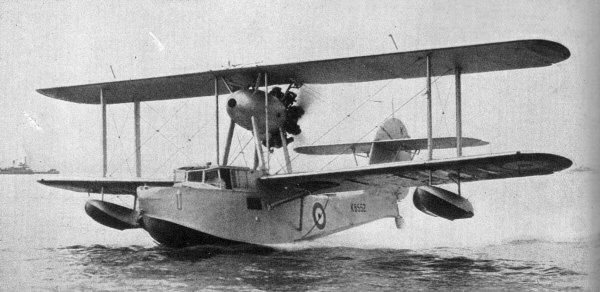
Supermarine Walrus reconnaissance plane

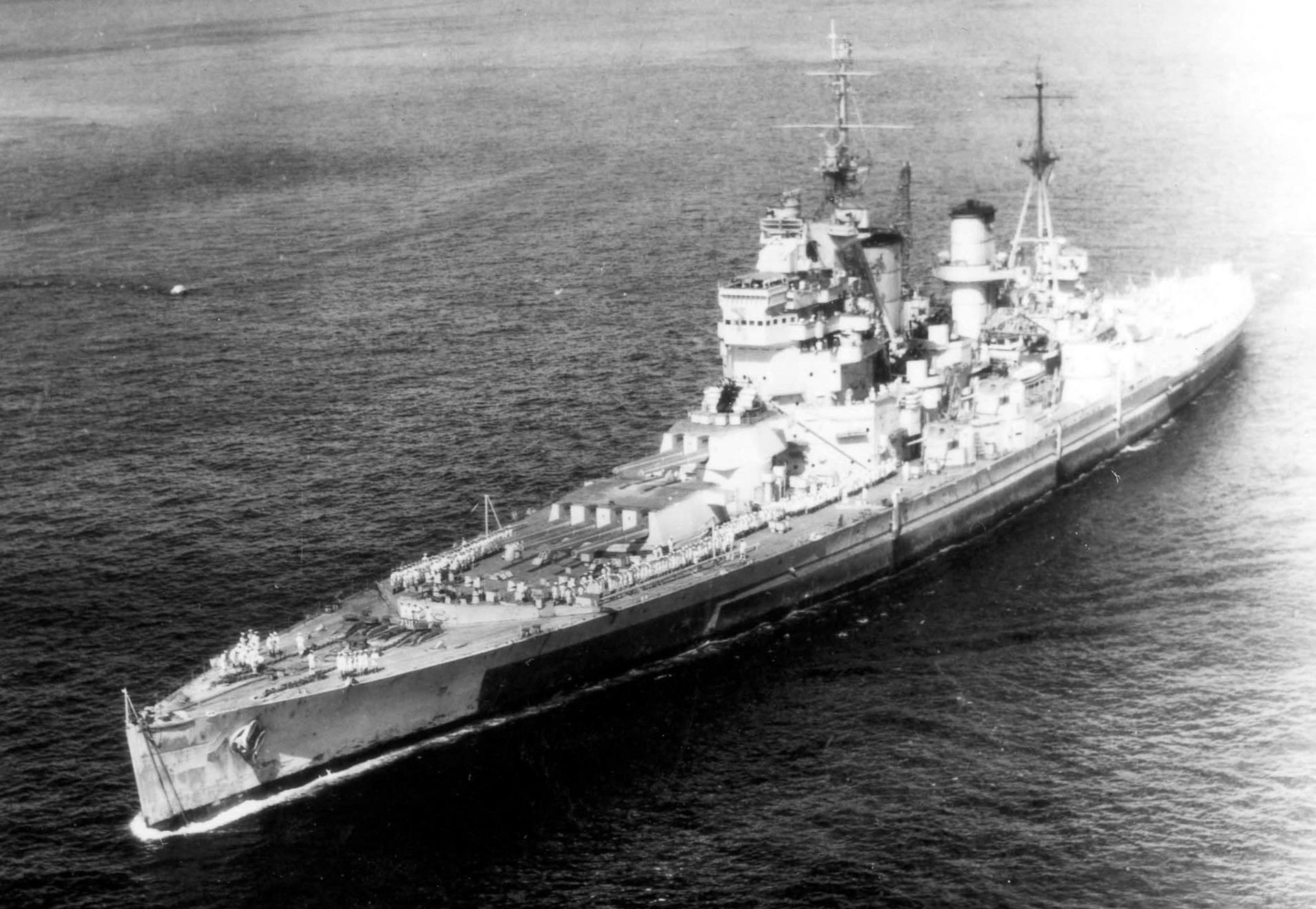
The attleship King George V in Apra Harbor, Guam, 1945

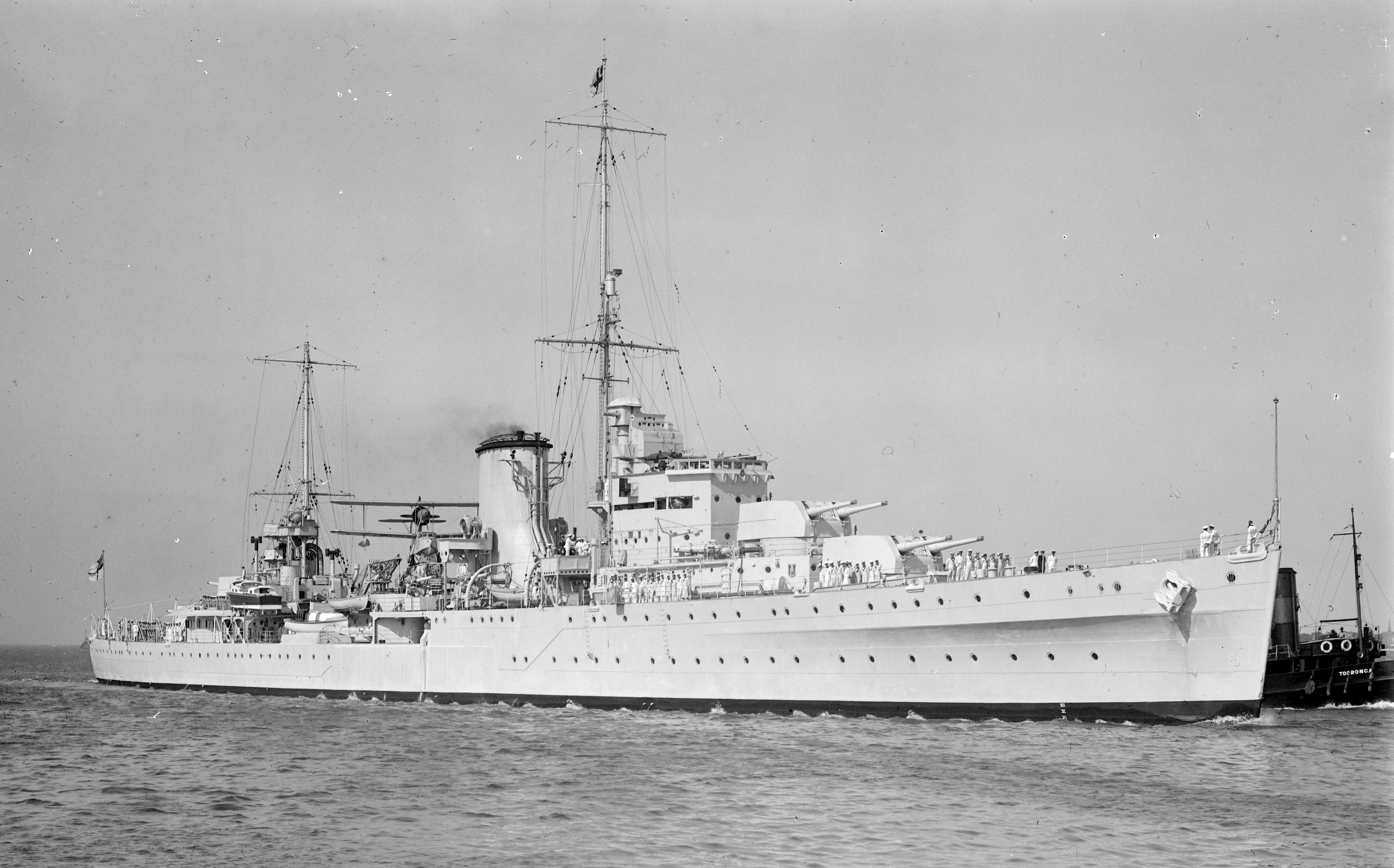
Light cruiser Achilles at anchor

Commanded by Vice Admiral Sir Bernard Rawlings, RN

1st Aircraft Carrier Squadron (Task Group 57.2), Rear Admiral Sir Philip Vian, RN

- 5 fleet carriers over the period
  - HMS Indomitable (Capt. John Eccles, RN), 44 aircraft
    - 29 Grumman Hellcat fighters
    - 15 Grumman Avenger torpedo-bombers
  - HMS Victorious (Capt. Michael Denny, RN), 53 aircraft
    - 37 Vought Corsair fighters (1836 Naval Air Squadron,
    - 14 TBF Avenger torpedo-bombers (849 Naval Air Squadron)
    - 2 Supermarine Walrus air-sea rescue aircraft
  - HMS Illustrious (Capt. Charles Lambe, RN), 52 aircraft - withdrawn for repairs 14 April
    - 36 Corsair fighters
    - 16 Avenger torpedo-bombers
  - HMS Indefatigable (Capt. Quintin Graham, RN), 69 aircraft
    - 40 Supermarine Seafire fighters
    - 20 Avenger torpedo-bombers
    - 9 Fairey Firefly fighters
  - HMS Formidable (Capt. P. Ruck-Keene, RN), 43 aircraft - replaced Illustrious 14 April
    - 28 Corsair fighters
    - 15 Avenger torpedo-bombers

1st Battle Squadron (Task Group 57.1), Vice Admiral Rawlings

- 2 King George V battleships (10 × 14-inch main battery)
  - HMS King George V
  - HMS Howe

4th Cruiser Squadron (Task Group 57.4), Rear Admiral Patrick Brind

- 7 light cruisers
  - 2 Crown Colony-class: HMNZS Gambia (12 × 6-in. main battery), HMCS Uganda (9 × 6-in. main battery)
  - 1 Minotaur-class: HMS Swiftsure (12 × 6-in. main battery)
  - 1 Leander-class: HMNZS Achilles (6 × 6-in. main battery)
  - 3 Dido-class: HMS Argonaut (8 × 5.25-in. main battery), HMS Euryalus (10 × 5.25-in. main battery), HMS Black Prince (10 × 5.25-in. main battery)

Screen (Task Group 57.8), Rear Admiral John Edelsten

- 4th Destroyer Flotilla
- 24th Destroyer Flotilla
- 25th Destroyer Flotilla
- 27th Destroyer Flotilla - HMS Kempenfelt (flotilla leader) and the W-class destroyers Wakeful, Whirlwind, Whelp, Wager Wessex

British Fleet Train (Task Force 112), Rear Admiral Douglas Fisher, RN 70+ auxiliaries including repair ships, oilers, minesweepers, hospital ships, etc.

- HMS Unicorn - aircraft repair ship

=== Fast Carrier Force (Task Force 58) ===
Carrier admirals

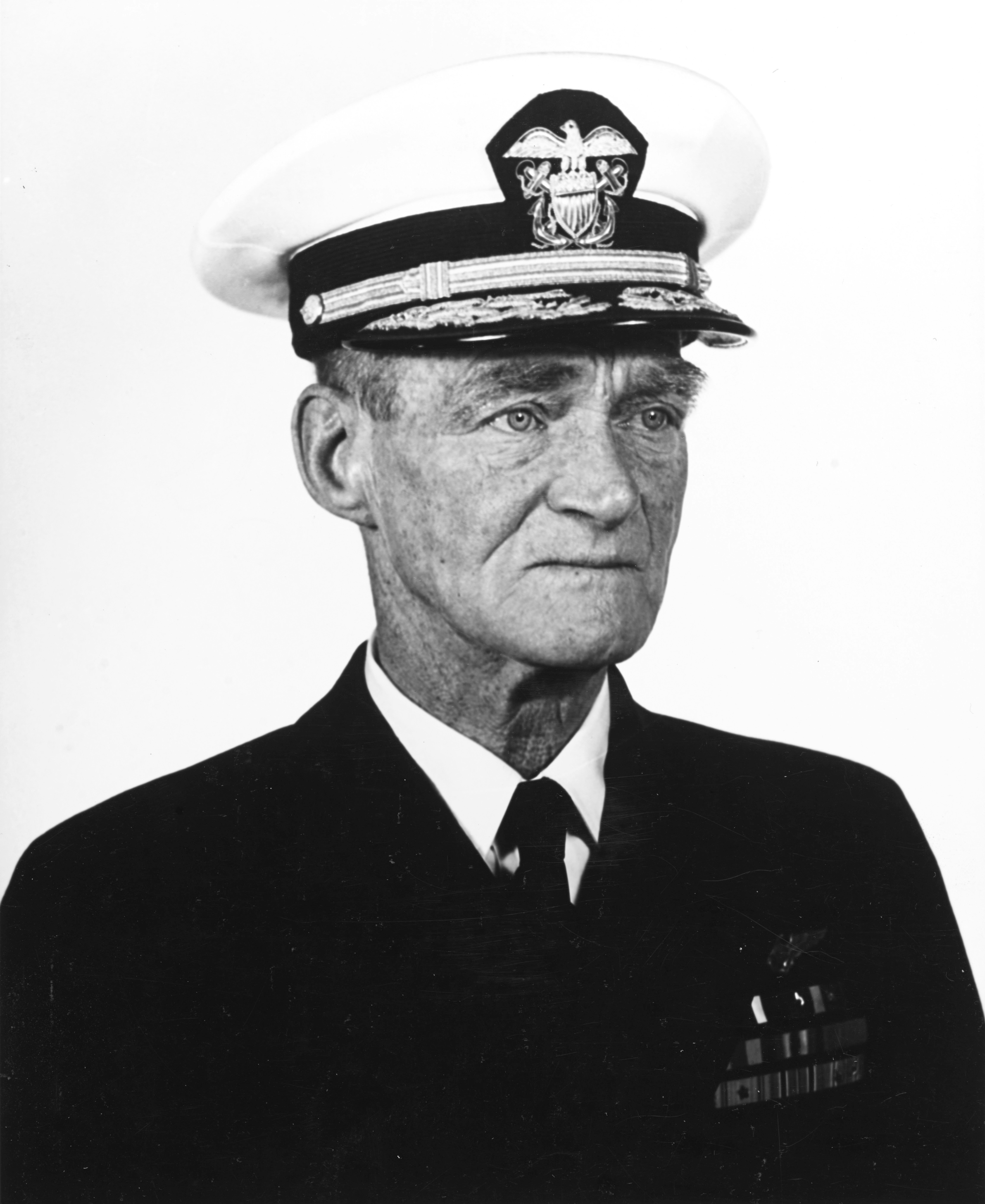
Vice Adm. Marc A. Mitscher

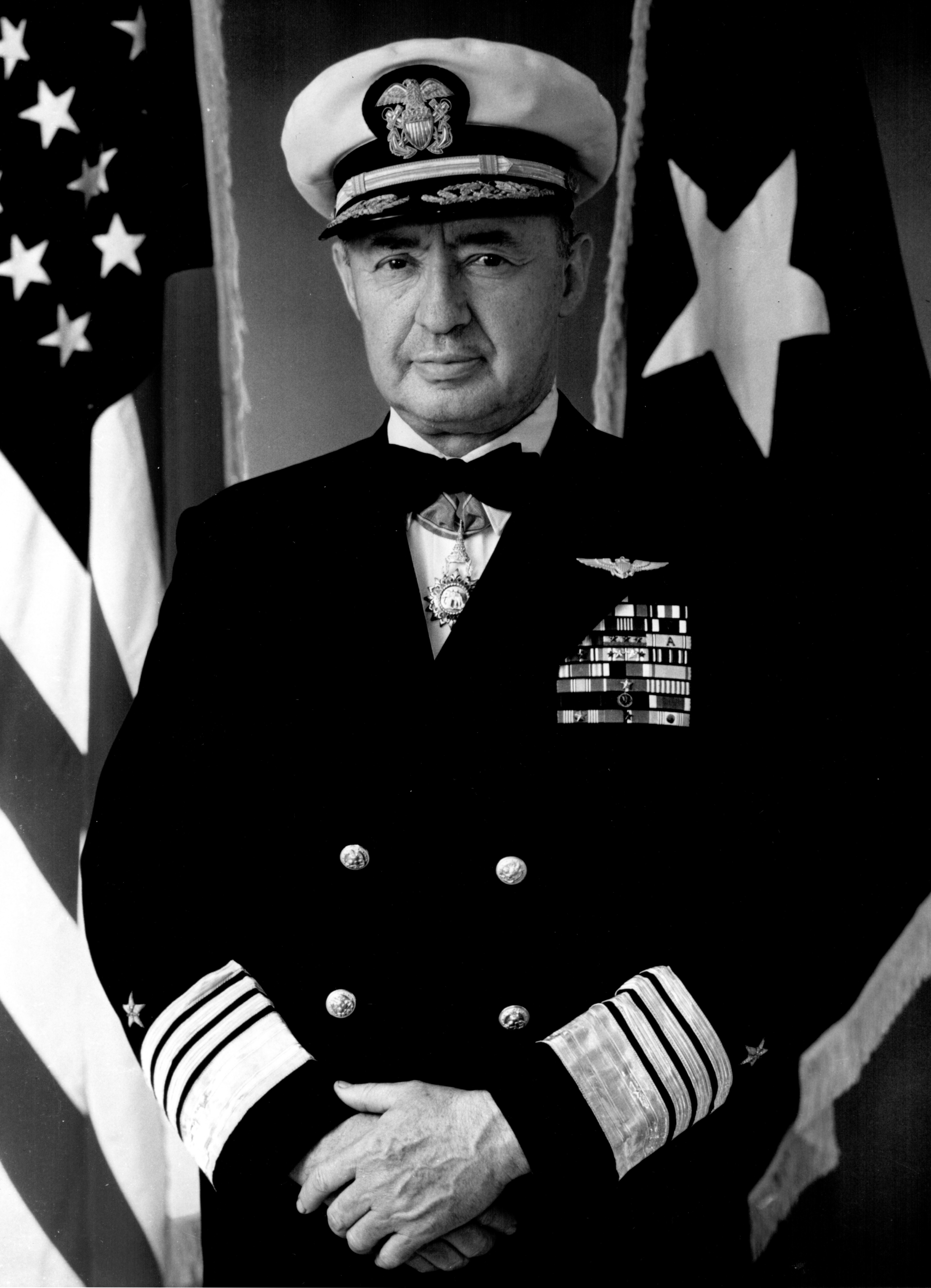
Rear Adm. Joseph J. Clark

Vice Admiral Marc A. Mitscher in fleet carrier Bunker Hill

Task Group 58.1

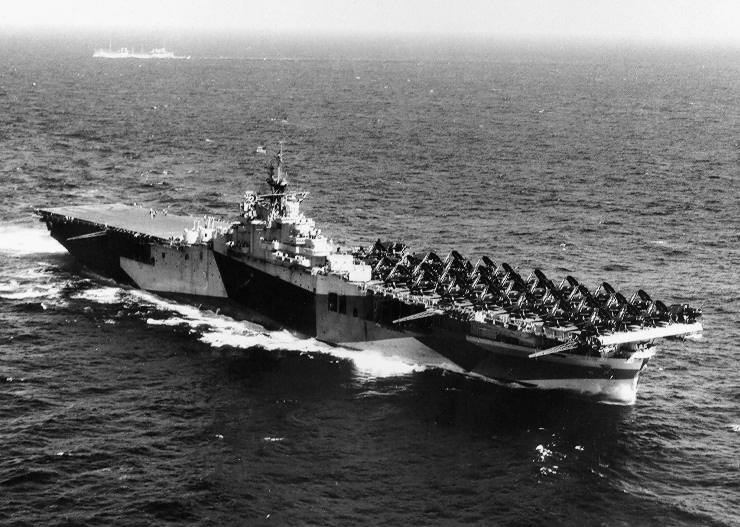
Fleet carrier Bennington October 1944 during shakedown in Caribbean Sea

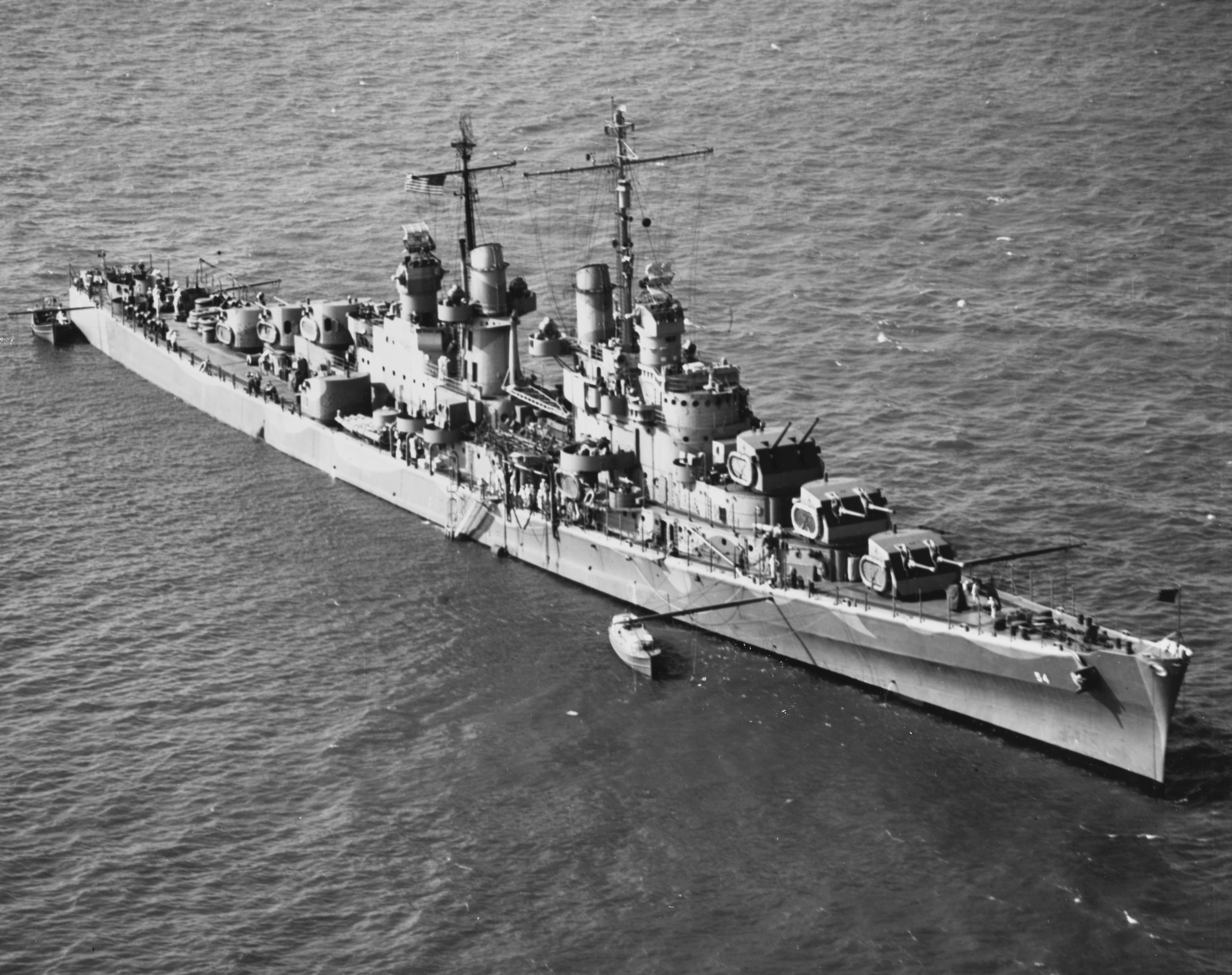
Anti-aircraft light cruiser San Juan off Norfolk in 1942

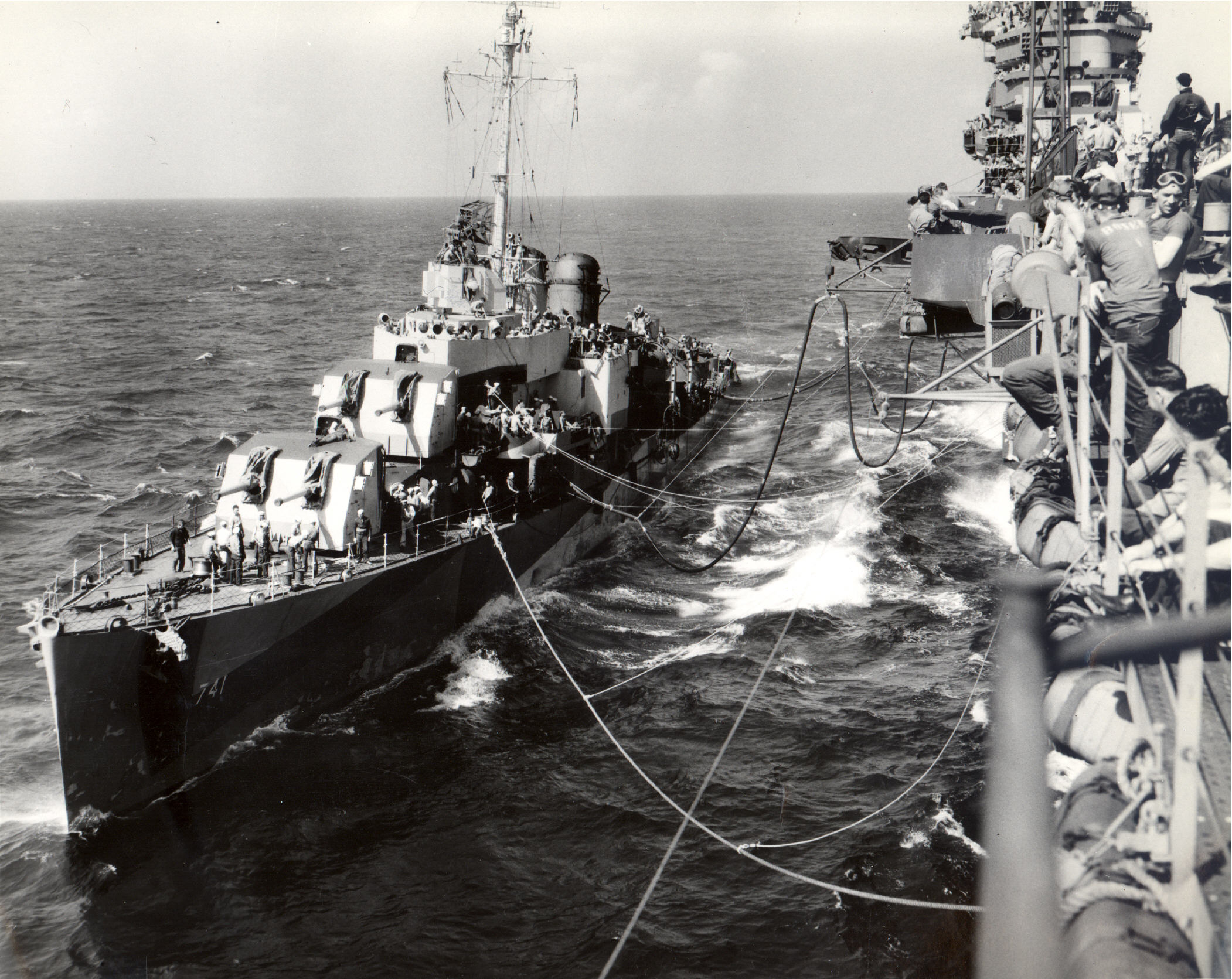
Allen M. Sumner-class destroyer Drexler refueling, February 1945

Rear Admiral Joseph J. Clark

3 fleet carriers

Hornet (Capt. Austin K. Doyle)

Air Group 17 (Cmdr. E.G. Konrad), 101 aircraft

VF-17: 71 F6F Hellcat fighters
VB-17: 15 SB2C Helldiver dive bombers
VT-17: 15 TBM Avenger torpedo bombers

Wasp (Capts. O.A. Weller and W.G. Switzer)

Air Group 86 (Cmdr. G.R. Luker), 100 aircraft

VBF-86: 36 F4U Corsair fighters
VF-86: 34 F6F Hellcat fighters
VB-86: 15 SB2C Helldiver dive bombers
VT-86: 15 TBM Avenger torpedo bombers

Bennington (Capts. J.B. Sykes and B.L. Braun)

Air Group 82 (Cmdr. G.L. Heap), 102 aircraft

VF-82: 37 F6F Hellcat fighters
VB-82: 15 SB2C Helldiver dive bombers
VT-82: 15 TBM Avenger torpedo bombers
VMF-112: 18 F4U Corsair fighters
VMF-123: 17 F4U Corsair fighters

2 light carriers

Belleau Wood (Capts. John Perry and W.G. Tomlinson)

Air Group 30 (Lt. Cmdr. D.A. Clark), 34 aircraft

VF-30: 25 F6F Hellcat fighters
VT-30: 9 TBM Avenger torpedo bombers

San Jacinto (Capt. M.H. Kernodle)

Air Group 45 (Cmdr. G.E. Schecter), 34 aircraft

VF-45: 25 F6F Hellcat fighters
VT-45: 9 TBM Avenger torpedo bombers

Battleship Division 8 (Rear Admiral John F. Shafroth Jr.)

3 fast battleships

South Dakota (Capts. C.F. Stillman and Charles B. Momsen) - flagship
Massachusetts (Capts. W.W. Warlick and John R. Redman)
Indiana (Capts. T.J. Keliher and Francis P. Old)

Cruiser Division 10 (Rear Admiral Lloyd J. Wiltse)

3 heavy cruisers

Baltimore (Capt. C.K. Fink)
Quincy (Capt. John Augustine Waters Jr)
Pittsburgh (Capt. John E. Gingrich)

Cruiser Division 14 (Rear Admiral Francis E. M. Whiting)

3 light cruisers

Vincennes (Capt. W.G. Lalor)
Miami (Capt. Thomas H. Binford)
Vicksburg (Capt. W.C. Vose)

1 anti-aircraft light cruiser (Note: These cruisers were intended as destroyer leaders when designed. After the first two to be used in this role, Atlanta and Juneau, were lost at the Naval Battle of Guadalcanal, this mission was rejected and the anti-aircraft mission adopted.)

San Juan (Capts. J.F. Donovan and G.H. Bahm)

Screen

21 destroyers

9 Allen M. Sumner-class (6 × 5-in. main battery): Dehaven, Mansfield, Lyman K. Swenson, Collett, Maddox, (Note: About 19 years after Okinawa, the Maddox was involved in the Tonkin Gulf Incident that served as a pretext for the escalation of US combat forces in Vietnam.) Blue, Brush, Taussig, Samuel N. Moore
12 Fletcher-class (5 × 5-in. main battery): Wedderburn, Twining, Stockham, John Rodgers, Stevens, Harrison, McKee, Murray, Sigsbee, Ringgold, Schroeder, Dashiell

Task Group 58.2

Carrier admirals

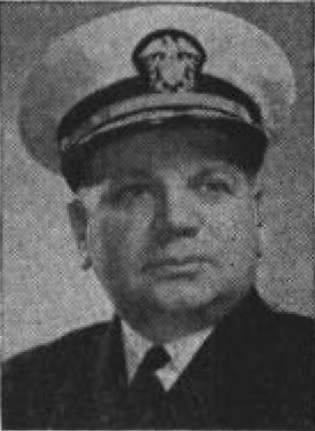
Rear Adm. Ralph E. Davison

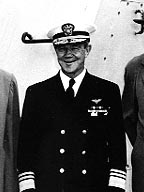
Rear Adm. Gerald F. Bogan

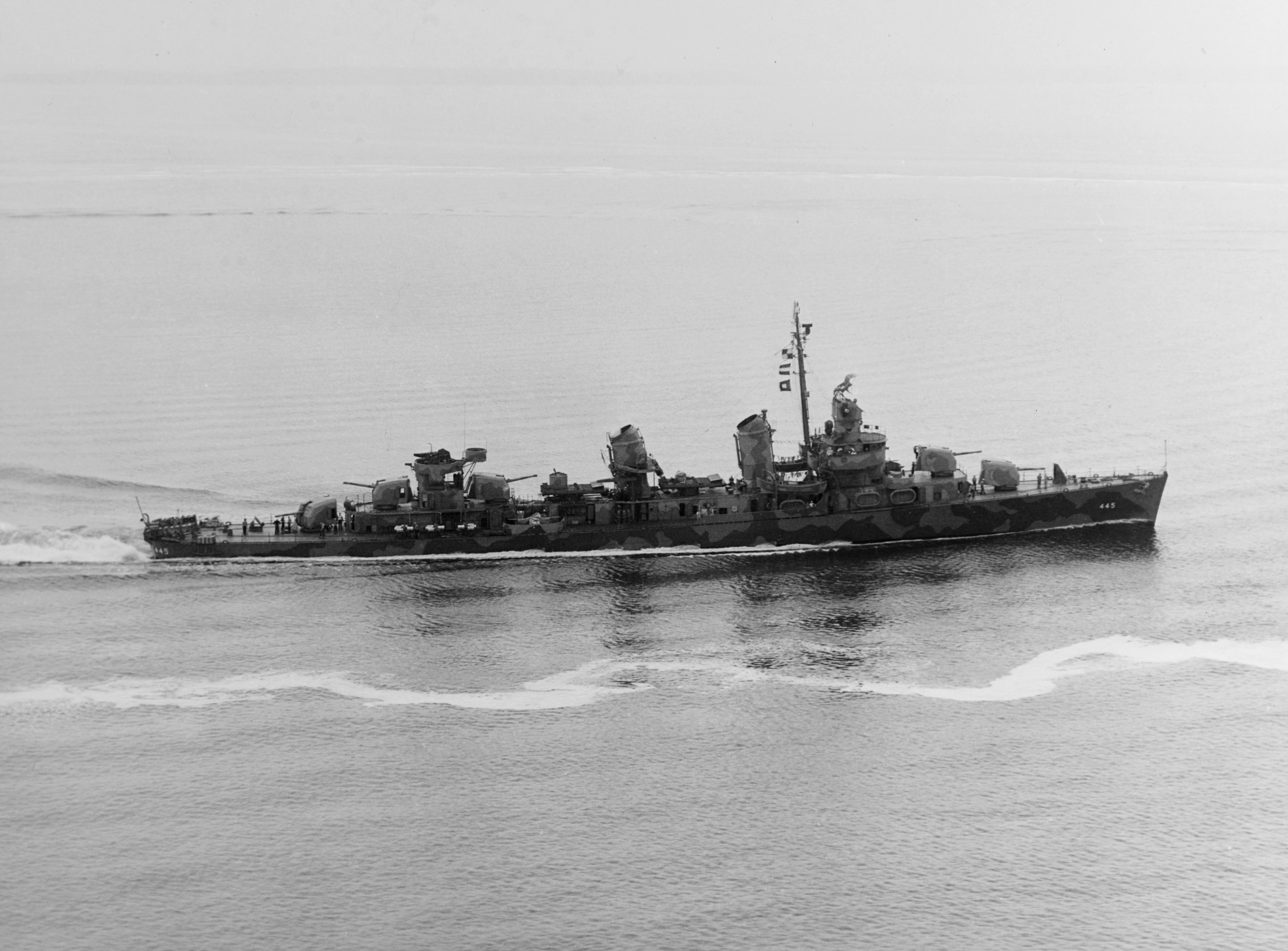
Fletcher-class destroyer underway

Rear Admirals Ralph E. Davison and Gerald F. Bogan

3 fleet carriers

Enterprise (Capt. Grover B. H. Hall)

Night Air Group 90 (Cmdr. W.I. Martin), 53 aircraft

VFN-90: 32 F6F Hellcat fighters
VTN-90: 21 TBM Avenger torpedo bombers

Franklin (Capt. Leslie E. Gehres)

Air Group 5 (Cmdr. E.B. Parker Jr.), 90 aircraft

VF-5: 19 F6F Hellcat fighters
VB-5: 8 SB2C Helldiver, 11 SBW Helldiver dive bombers
VT-5: 6 TBF Avenger, 10 TBM Avenger torpedo bombers
VMF-214: 18 F4U Corsair fighters
VMF-452: 18 F4U Corsair fighters

Randolph (Capt. F.L. Baker)

Air Group 12 (Cmdrs. C.L. Crommelin (KIA), E.J. Pawka, USNR), 97 aircraft

VF-12: 33 F6F Hellcat fighters
VBF-12: 24 F6F Hellcat fighters
VB-12: 15 SB2C Helldiver dive bombers
VT-12: 15 TBM Avenger torpedo bombers

1 light cruiser

Santa Fe (Capt. H.C. Fitz)

Screen

8 Fletcher-class destroyers (5 × 5-in. main battery): Miller, Owen, Hickox, Hunt, Lewis Hancock, Marshall, Stephen Potter, Tingey

Task Group 58.3

Light carrier Cabot in 1945

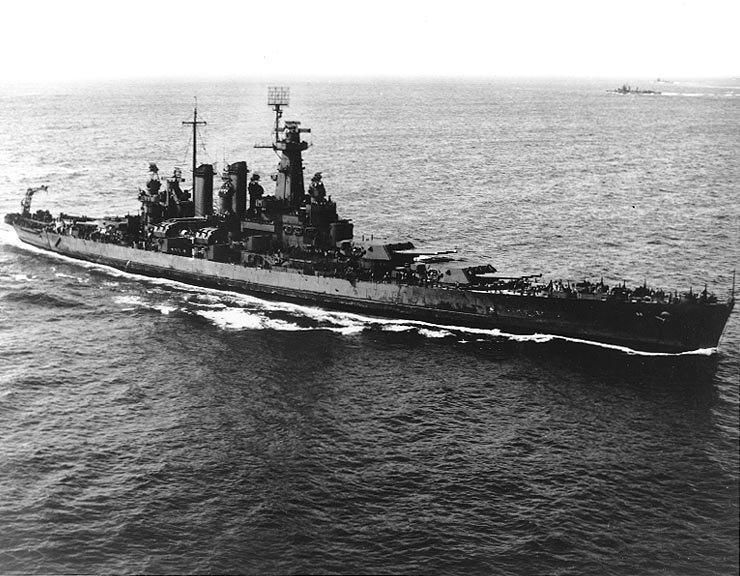
Fast battleship North Carolina underway

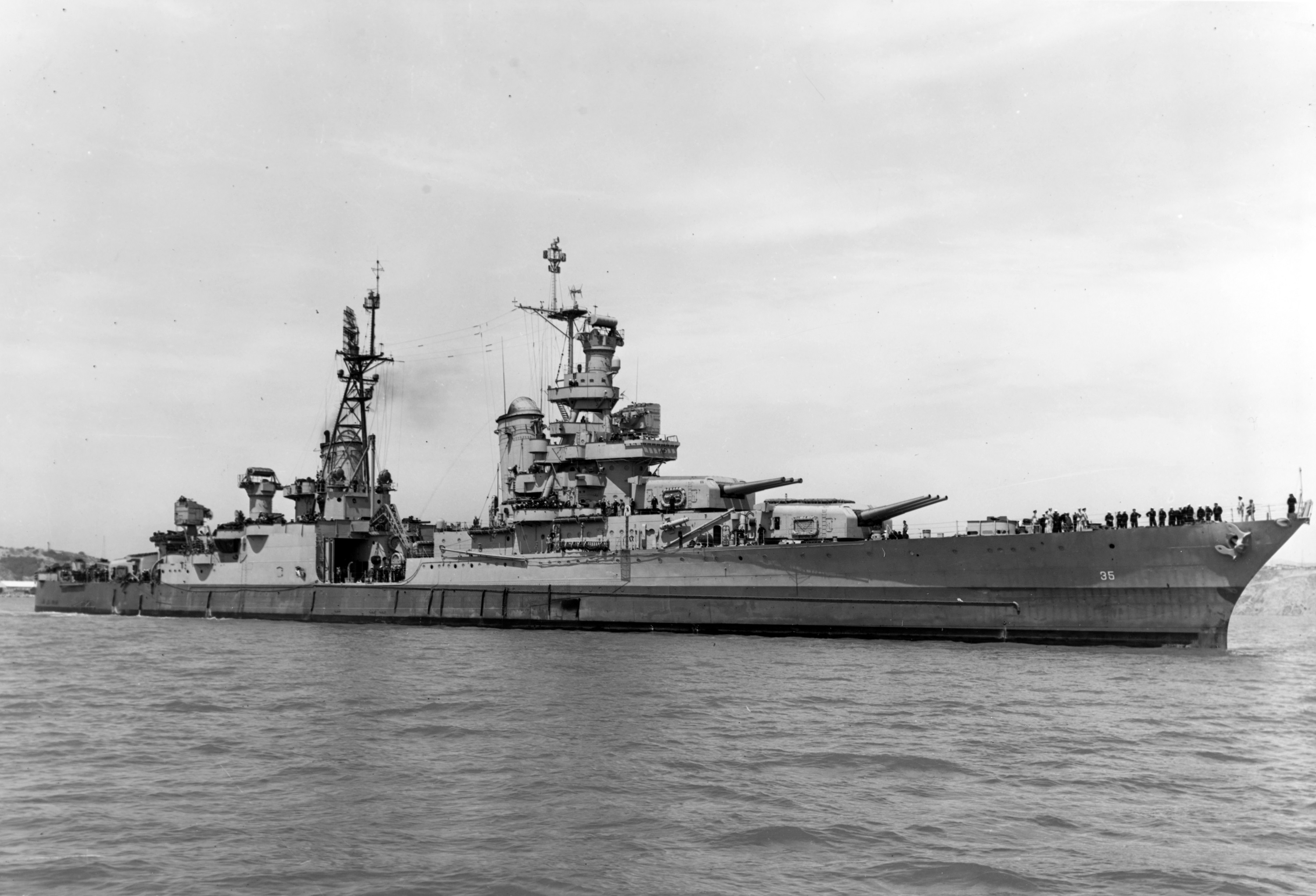
Heavy cruiser Indianapolis

Rear Admiral Frederick C. Sherman

3 fleet carriers

Essex (Capt. C.W. Wieber)

Air Group 83 (Cmdr. Harmon Tischer Utter), 102 aircraft

VF-83: 36 F6F Hellcat fighters
VBF-83: 36 F4U Corsair fighters
VB-83: 15 SB2C Helldiver dive bombers
VT-83: 15 TBM Avenger torpedo bombers

Bunker Hill (Capt. G.A Seitz)

Air Group 84 (Cmdr. G.M. Ottinger), 103 aircraft

VF-84: 27 F4U Corsair fighters, 10 F6F Hellcat fighters
VB-84: 15 SB2C Helldiver dive bombers
VT-84: 15 TBM Avenger torpedo bombers
VMF-221: 18 F4U Corsair fighters
VMF-451: 18 F4U Corsair fighters

Hancock (Capt. R.F. Hickey)

Air Group 6 (Cmdr. H.L. Miller), 94 aircraft

VF-6: 36 F6F Hellcat fighters
VBF-6: 36 F6F Hellcat fighters
VB-6: 12 SB2C Helldiver dive bombers
VT-6: 10 TBM Avenger torpedo bombers

2 light carriers

Cabot (Capt. W.W. Smith)

Air Group 29 (Lt. Cmdr. W.E. Eder), 33 aircraft

VF-29: 24 F6F Hellcat fighters
VT-29: 9 TBM Avenger torpedo bombers

Bataan (Capt. J.B. Heath)

Air Group 47 (Cmdr. Walker Etheridge and Lt. Cmdr. A.H. Clancy), 36 aircraft

VF-47: 24 F6F Hellcat fighters
VT-47: 12 TBM Avenger torpedo bombers

Battleship Division 6 (Rear Admiral Thomas R. Cooley)

2 fast battleships

North Carolina (Capts. Oswald S. Colclough and Byron H. Hanlon)
Washington (Capts. Roscoe F. Good and Francis X. McInerney)

Cruiser Division 17 (Rear Admiral J. Cary Jones)

1 heavy cruiser

Indianapolis (Capt. C.B. McVay)

4 light cruisers

Pasadena (Capts. R.B. Tuggle and James H. Doyle)
Springfield (Capts. F.L. Johnson and T.J. Kelley)
Astoria (Capts. George C. Dyer and W.V. Hamilton)
Wilkes-Barre (Capt. R.L. Porter)

Screen

17 destroyers

9 Allen M. Sumner-class (6 × 5-in. main battery): Ault, English, Charles S. Sperry, Waldron, Haynsworth, Wallace L. Lind, John W. Weeks, Hank, Borie
8 Fletcher-class (5 × 5-in. main battery): Erben, Walker, Hale, Stembel, Black, Bullard, Kidd, Chauncey

Task Group 58.4

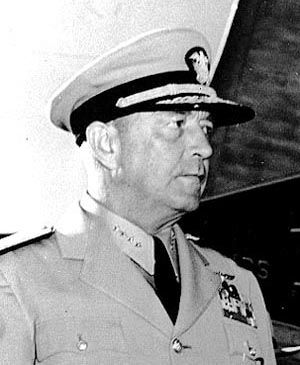
Rear Adm. Arthur W. Radford

(Note: Served as Chairman of the Joint Chiefs of Staff, Aug 1953-Aug 1957)

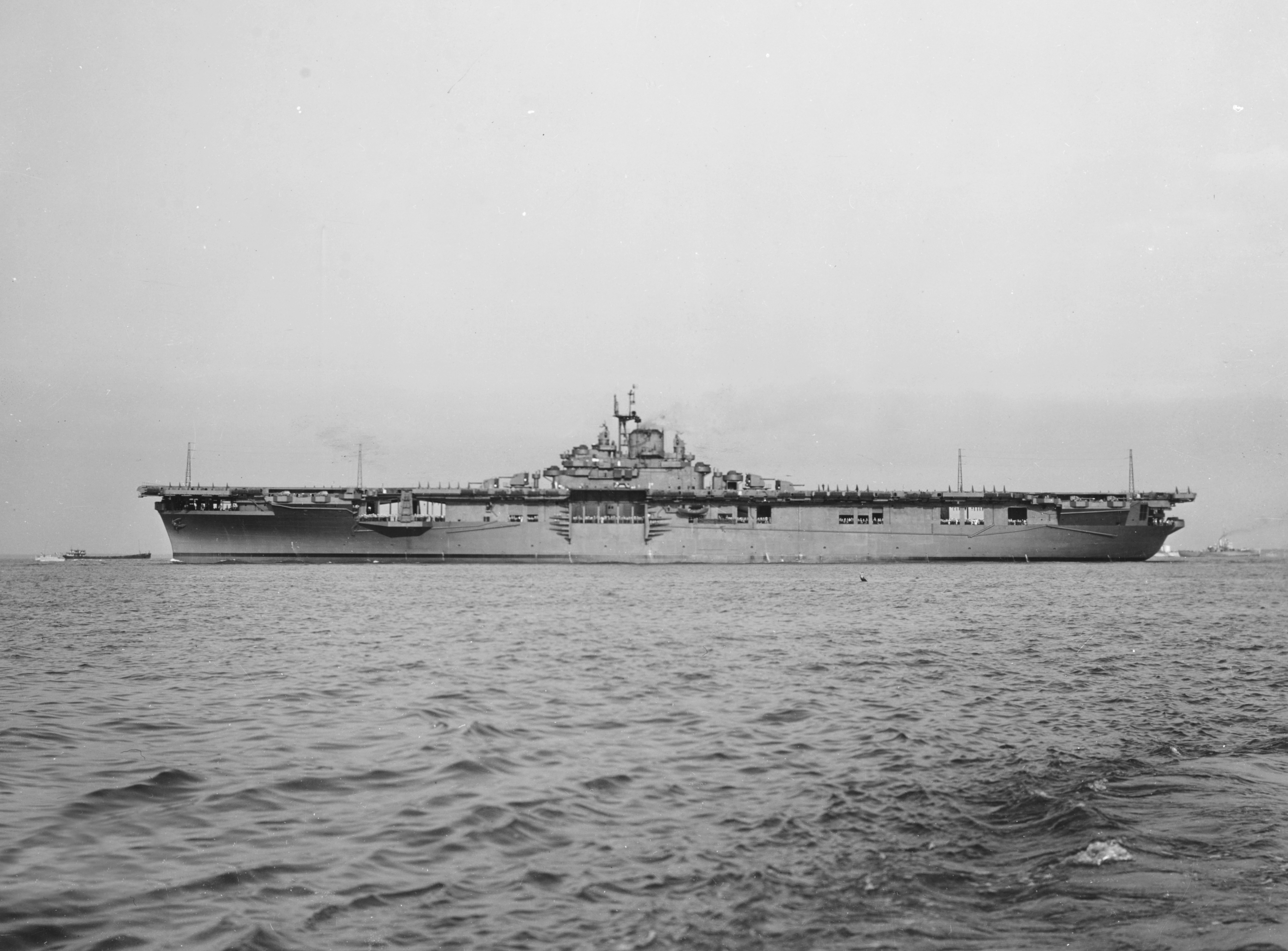
Fleet carrier Intrepid off Newport News, August 1943

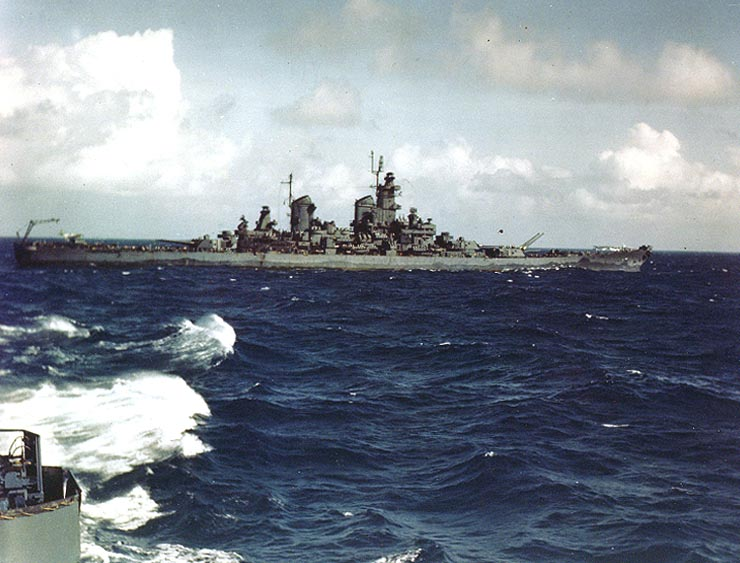
Fast battleship New Jersey underway

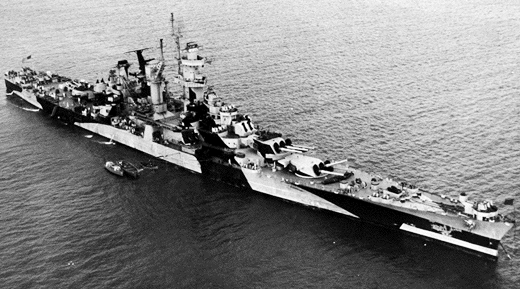
Large cruiser Alaska at anchor, 1944

Rear Admiral Arthur W. Radford

2 fleet carriers

Yorktown (Capts. T.S. Combs and Walter F. Boone)

Air Group 9 (Cmdr. P.H. Torrey and Lt. Cmdr. H.N. Houck, USNR), 95 aircraft

VF-9: 40 F6F Hellcat fighters
VBF-9: 33 F6F Hellcat fighters
VB-9: 15 SB2C Helldiver dive bombers
VT-9: 7 TBM Avenger torpedo bombers

Intrepid (Capt. G.E. Short)

Air Group 10 (Cmdr. J.J. Hyland), 102 aircraft

VF-10: 30 F4U Corsair, 6 F6F Hellcat fighters
VBF-10: 36 F4U Corsair fighters
VB-10: 15 SB2C Helldiver dive bombers
VT-10: 15 TBF Avenger torpedo bombers

2 light carriers

Langley (Capt. J.F. Wegforth)

Air Group 23 (Lt. Cmdr. Merlin Paddock, USNR (KIA) and Cmdr. J.J. Southerland), 34 aircraft

VF-23: 25 F6F Hellcat fighters
VT-23: 9 TBM Avenger torpedo bombers

Independence (Capt. N.M. Kindell)

Air Group 46 (Cmdr. C.W. Rooney), 33 aircraft

VF-46: 25 F6F Hellcat fighters
VT-46: 8 TBM Avenger torpedo bombers

Battleship Division 9 (Rear Admiral Edward W. Hanson and Louis E. Denfeld)

3 fast battleships

Wisconsin (Capt. Earl E. Stone and John W. Roper)
Missouri (Capts. W.M. Callaghan and Stuart S. Murray)
New Jersey (Capt. Edmund T. Wooldridge)

Cruiser Division 16 (Rear Admiral Francis S. Low)

2 large cruisers

Alaska (Capt. K.H. Noble)
Guam (Capt. Leland P. Lovette)

1 light cruiser

St. Louis (Capt. J.B. Griggs)

3 anti-aircraft light cruisers

Flint (Capt. C.R. Will)
Oakland (Capt. K.S. Reed)
San Diego (Capt. W.E.A. Mullan)

Screen

17 Fletcher-class destroyers (5 × 5-in. main battery): Remey, Norman Scott, Mertz, Monssen, McGowan, McNair, Melvin, McCord, Trathen, Hazelwood, Heermann, Haggard, Franks, Hailey, Cushing, Colahan, Uhlmann, Benham

== Allied logistics and support vessels ==
=== Support and Service Units (Task Force 50) ===
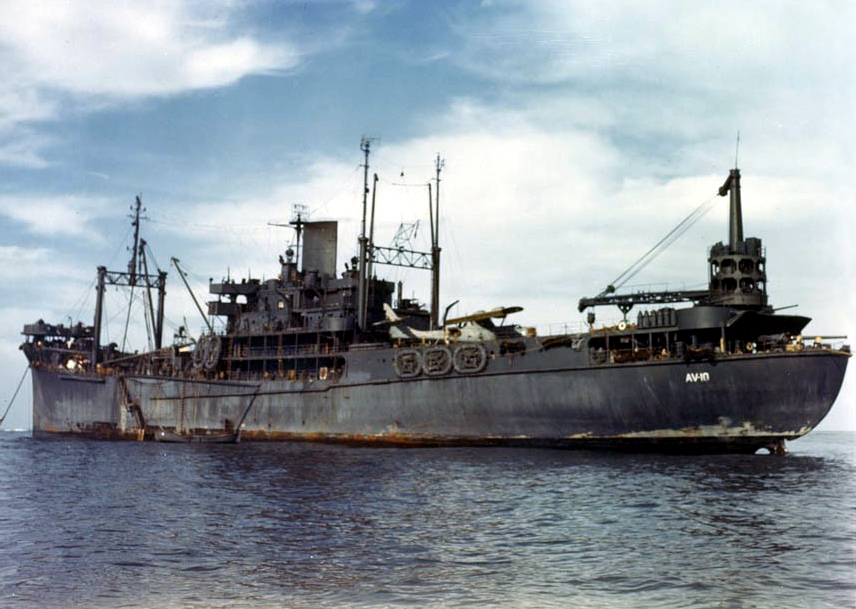
Seaplane tender Chandeleur

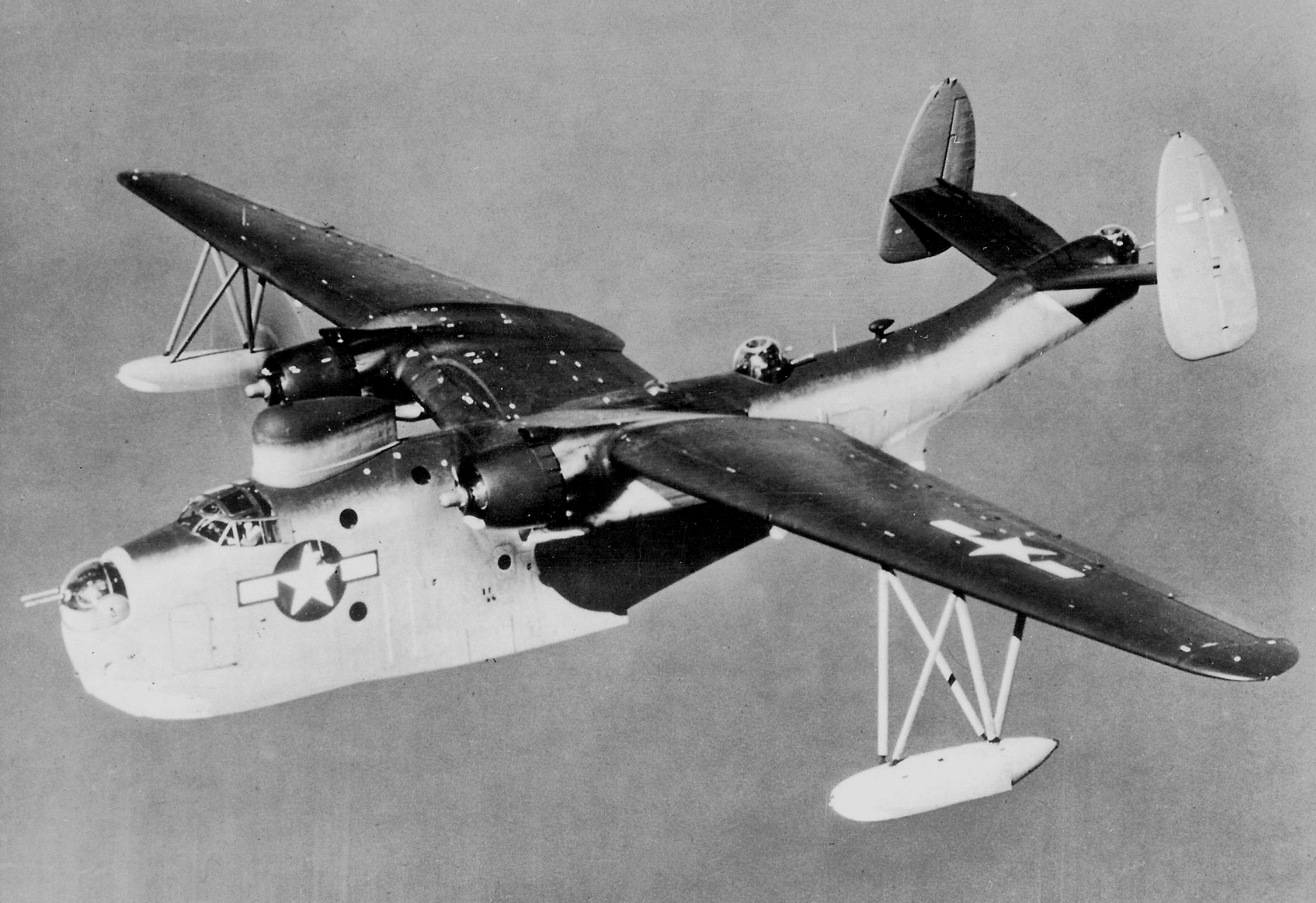
Martin PBM Mariner

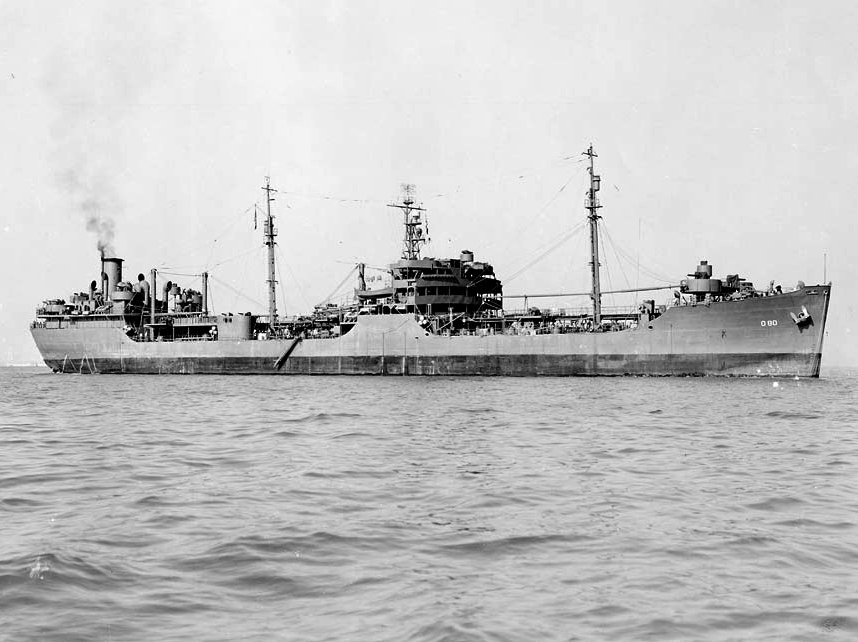
Oiler Escambia

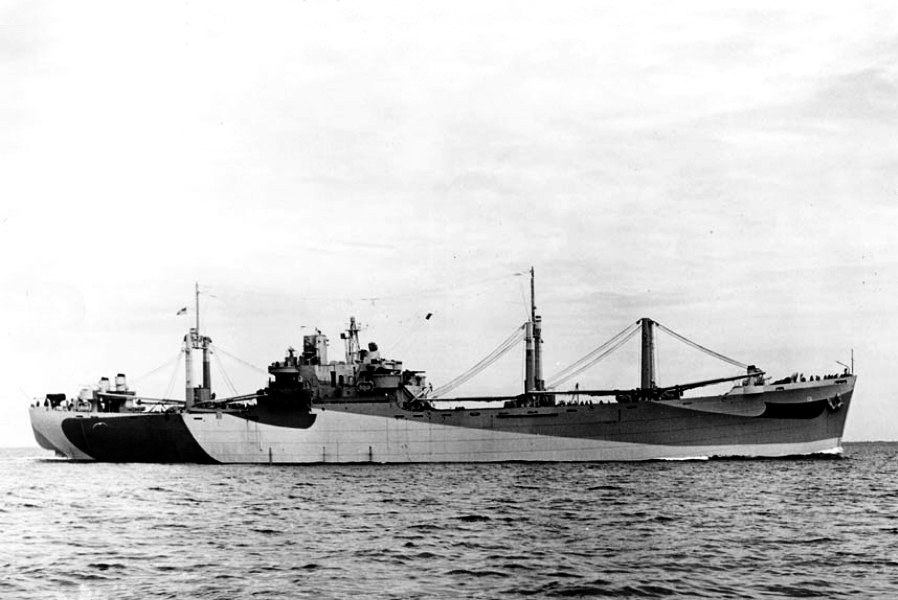
Ammunition ship Akutan

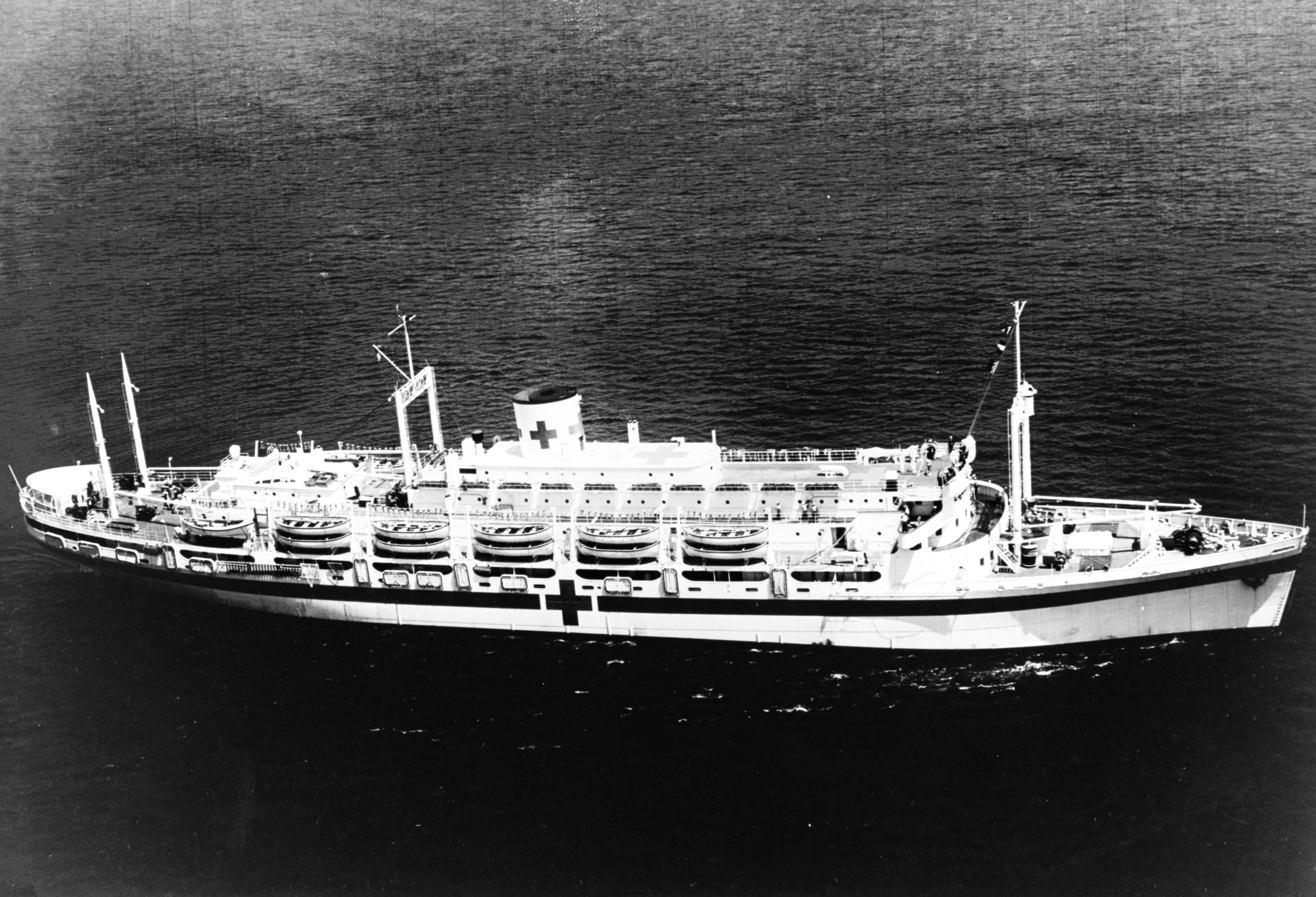
Hospital ship Mercy

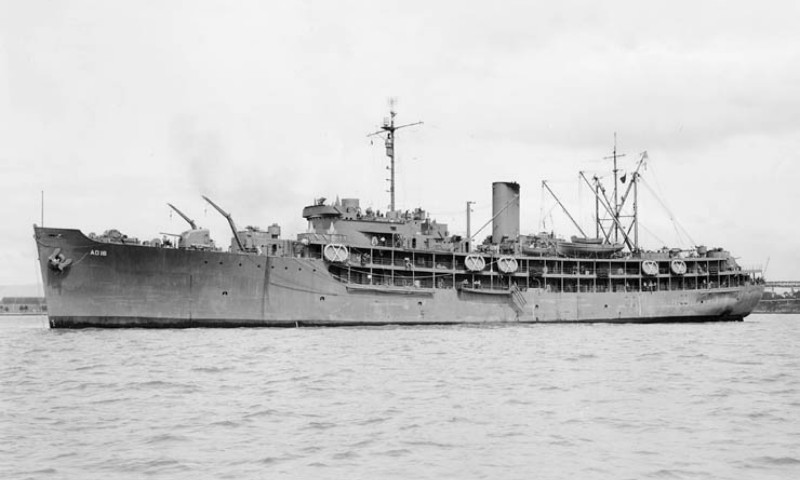
Destroyer tender Cascade

Search and Reconnaissance Group (Task Group 50.5)
Commodore Dixwell Ketcham

3 seaplane tenders

Hamlin (Capt. G.A. McLean)

VPB-208 (Lt. Cmdr. A.J. Sintic, USNR)
12 Martin PBM Mariner patrol bomber flying boats

St. George (Capt. R.G. Armstrong)

VPB-18 (Lt. Cmdr. R.R. Boettcher)
12 Martin PBM Mariner patrol bomber flying boats

Chandeleur (Cmdr. J.S. Tracy)

VPB-21 (Lt. Cmdrs. J.E. Dougherty & J.D. Wright)
12 Martin PBM Mariner patrol bomber flying boats

3 small seaplane tenders

Yakutat (Cmdr. G.K. Fraser)
Onslow (Cmdr. A.D. Schwarz)
Shelikof (Cmdr. R.E. Stanley)

VPB-27 (Lt. Cmdr. E.N. Chase)
12 Martin PBM Mariner patrol bomber flying boats

Bering Strait (Cmdr. W.D. Innis)

VH-3 (Lt. Cmdr. W.D. Bonvillian)
6 Martin PBM Mariner patrol bomber flying boats

2 destroyer seaplane tenders: Thornton (sunk after collision 5 April), Gillis
1 Clemson-class destroyer: Williamson

Logistics Support Group Fifth Fleet (Task Group 50.8)
Rear Admiral Donald B. Beary in light cruiser Detroit

Support escort carriers

Shamrock Bay (Capts. F.T. Ward and J.E. Leeper)

VC-94 (Lt. Cmdr. J.F. Patterson, USNR ( †) and Lt. L.E. Terry)
18 FM-2 Wildcat fighters
12 TBM Avenger torpedo bombers

Makassar Strait (Capt. Herbert D. Riley)

VC-97 (Lt. Cmdr. M.T. Whittier, USNR)
14 FM-2 Wildcat fighters
12 TBM Avenger torpedo bombers

CVE Plane Transport Unit (Task Unit 50.8.4)

Attu (Capt. H.F. MacComsey)
Admiralty Islands (Capt. M.E.A. Gouin)
Bougainville (Capt. C.A. Bond)
Windham Bay (Capt. G.T. Mundorff)

Logistics and Support Vessels

49 oilers: Cuyama, Brazos, Cimarron, Platte, Sabine, Kaskaskia, Guadalupe, Chicopee, Housatonic, Merrimack, Kankakee, Lackawanna, Monongahela, Tappahannock, Patuxent, Neches, Suamico, Tallulah, Ashtabula, Cacapon, Caliente, Chikaskia, Aucilla, Marias, Manatee, Nantahala, Severn, Taluga, Chipola, Tolovana, Pecos, Atascosa, Cache, Enoree, Escalante, Neshanic, Niobrara, Millicoma, Saranac, Cossatot, Cowanesque, Escambia, Cahaba, Mascoma, Ocklawaha, Ponaganset, Sebec, Tomahawk, Anacostia
16 ammunition ships: Akutan, Firedrake, Lassen, Mauna Loa, Shasta, Vesuvius, Wrangell, Canada Victory (sunk by kamikaze 27 Apr) Bedford Victory, Bucyrus Victory, Manderson Victory, Las Vegas Victory, Logan Victory (sunk by kamikaze 6 Apr), Greenburg Victory, Pierre Victory, Hobbs Victory (sunk by kamikaze 6 Apr)
9 cargo ships: Adhara, Alkaid, Alkes, Allegan, Appanoose, Fomalhaut, Matar, Mintaka, Rotanin
8 hospital ships: Bountiful, Comfort, Hope, Mercy, Relief, Samaritan, Solace, plus transport Wharton
6 reefers (store ships): Adria, Athanasia, Bridge, Latona, Lioba, Merapi
2 survey ships: Armistead Rust, Bowditch
2 stores-issue ships: Antares, Castor
9 gasoline tankers: Wabash, Genesee, Kishwaukee, Nemasket, Escatawpa, Hiwassee, Ontonagon, Yahara, Ponchatoula, Sacandaga
6 station tankers: Armadillo, Giraffe, Marmora, Moose, Whippet, LCI(L)-993
10 repair ships: Vestal, Aristaeus, Nestor, Oceanus, Anchor, Clamp, Current, Deliver, Gear, Shackle
6 floating drydocks: ARD-13, ARD-22, ARD-27, ARD-28, AFD-14, AFDL-32
12 fleet tugs: Arikara, Chickasaw, Cree, Lipan, Mataco, Menominee, Munsee, Pakana, Tawakoni, Tekesta, Tenino, Ute
4 ocean tugs, 3 ocean tugs (rescue)

Screen: Screening vessels for the Logistics Group were assigned to TG 50.8 units as needed from a pool of 11 destroyers and 24 destroyer escorts.

== Japanese Imperial Navy order of battle ==
Japanese Combined Fleet
Admiral Soemu Toyoda

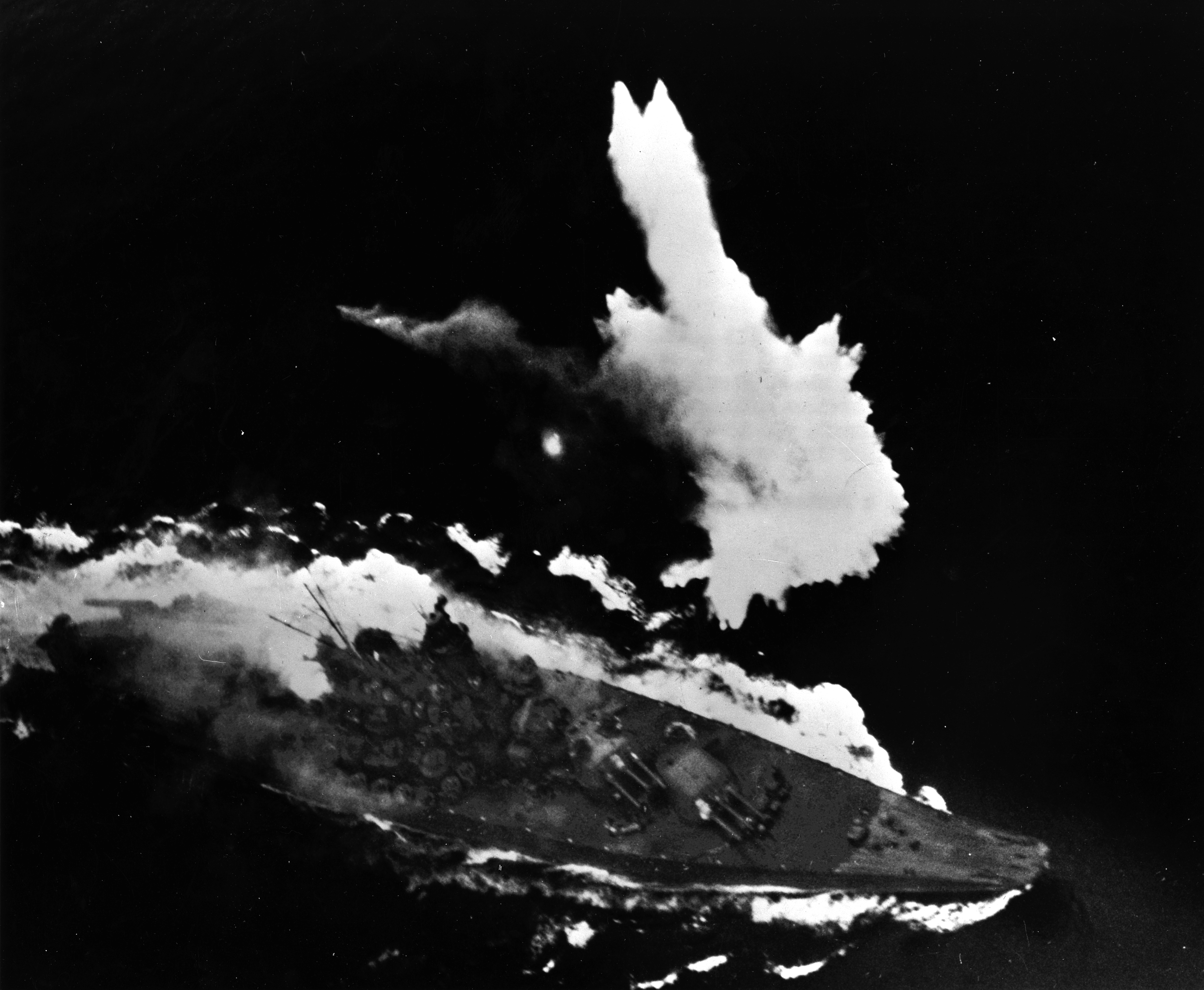
Super battleship Yamato under air attack, 7 April 1945

=== Shinyo Units ===
22nd Shinyo Squadron (Lt. Toyohiro)
42nd Shinyo Squadron (Lt. Lt Imoto)

=== Surface Special Attack Force ===
Vice Admiral Seiichi Itō (KIA)

Super battleship: Yamato (Note: Sunk by US carrier planes 7 April)

Captain Kōsaku Aruga (KIA)

Destroyer Squadron 2 (Rear Admiral Keizō Komura)

Light cruiser: Yahagi (Captain Tameichi Hara)
Destroyer Division 41 (Capt. M. Yoshida): Fuyutsuki, Suzutsuki
Destroyer Division 17 (Capt. K. Shintani): Isokaze, (Note: Scuttled after receiving severe damage from US carrier planes 7 April) Hamakaze, Yukikaze
Destroyer Division 21 (Capt. H. Kotaki – KIA): Asashimo, Kasumi, Hatsushimo

== Japanese Imperial Army order of battle ==
- Maru-ni units
  - 1st Sea Raiding Regiment
  - 2nd Sea Raiding Regiment
  - 3rd Sea Raiding Regiment
  - 4th Sea Raiding Regiment
  - 26th Sea Raiding Regiment
  - 27th Sea Raiding Regiment
  - 28th Sea Raiding Regiment
  - 29th Sea Raiding Regiment

== Naval vessels damaged and sunk at Okinawa ==
One hundred and forty-seven Allied naval vessels were damaged or sunk in the Battle of Okinawa between 19 March – 30 July 1945. Five were damaged by enemy suicide boats, and another five by mines. One source estimated that total Japanese sorties during the entire Okinawa campaign exceeded 3,700, with a large percentage kamikaze, and that the attackers damaged slightly more than 200 Allied vessels, with 4,900 naval officers and seamen killed and roughly 4,824 wounded or missing. HMS Illustrious was hit on 6 April, without crew casualties but suffered structural damage that was not noted at the time. As well as those caused by enemy action USS Thorton was damaged in a collision with another US ship. Those ships in a pink background, and with an asterisk were sunk or had to be scuttled due to irreparable damage. Of those sunk, the majority were relatively smaller ships; these included destroyers of around 300–450 feet long. A few small cargo ships were also sunk, several containing munitions which caught fire. Those ships whose names are preceded by a "#" pound sign were scrapped or decommissioned as a result of damage.

Allied Naval vessels damaged and sunk by Japanese forces at Okinawa (19 March – 30 July 1945)
Date	Ship	Type	Notes	Killed	Wounded
19 March 1945	USS Franklin	Carrier	Air attack by single aircraft, two 550 lb. bombs thru to hangar deck starts fires resulting in massive aviation and ammunition explosions	724	265
19 Mar 45	USS Wasp	Carrier	Air attack, bomb thru flight and hangar decks	101	269
20 Mar 45	USS Halsey Powell	Destroyer	Air attack, kamikaze	12	29
26 Mar 45	USS Halligan	Destroyer	Mine, 3 miles SE of Maye Shima, exploded 2 forward magazines, bow blown off Abandoned and drifted ashore.	153	39
26 Mar 45	USS Kimberly	Destroyer	Air attack, kamikaze	4	57
26 Mar 45	USS Nevada	Battleship	Air attack, kamikaze	11	49
26 Mar 45	USS Biloxi	Light Cruiser	Air attack, kamikaze	0	0
27 Mar 45	USS Murray	Destroyer	Air attack, bomb	1	116
27 Mar 45	USS O'Brian	Destroyer	Air attack, Val kamikaze w/bomb	50	76
28 Mar 45	USS Skylark	Small Minesweeper	Mine, struck mines twice off Hagushi beaches, 1st amidships. sank	5	25
28 Mar 45	USS LSM(R)-188	Landing Ship	Air attack by single kamikaze	15	32
29 Mar 45	USS Wyandot	Attack Cargo Ship	Mine, possibly bomb	0	1
31 Mar 45	USS Indianapolis	Cruiser	Air attack, bomb thru fuel tanks	9	20
1 Apr 45	USS Adams	Destroyer Minelayer	Air attack, kamikaze w/bombs to fantail	0	0
1 Apr 45	USS Alpine	Attack Transport	Air attack, bomb and kamikaze	16	27
1 Apr 45	USS Hinsdale	Attack Transport	Air attack, kamikaze w/bombs hit waterline	16	39
1 Apr 45	#USS LST-884	Tank Landing Ship	Air attack, kamikaze, scuttled May 6	24	21
2 Apr 45	USS Dickerson	Destroyer	Air attack, kamikaze Nick crashed bridge, towed, scuttled	54	23
2 Apr 45	USS Goodhue	Attack Transport	Air attack, kamikaze aimed at bridge glanced mainmast, hit cargo boom, gun tubs, over side	24	119
2 Apr 45	USS Henrico	Attack Transport	Air attack, kamikaze w/bombs hit bridge	49	125
2 Apr 45	USS Achernar	Attack Cargo Ship	Air attack, kamikaze w/bomb hit starboard	5	41
3 Apr 45	USS Wake Island	Escort Carrier	Air attack, kamikaze blew below waterline	0	0
3 Apr 45	USS Pritchett	Destroyer	Air attack, 500 lb bomb	0	0
3 Apr 45	USS Foreman	Destroyer	Air attack, bomb passed thru her bottom, exploded below	0	3
3 Apr 45	USS LST-599	Tank Landing Ship	Air attack, kamikaze thru main deck, fires	0	21
3 Apr 45	#USS LCT-876	Landing Craft Tank	Air attack	0	2
4 Apr 45	*USS LCI(G)-82	Landing Craft, Infantry, Gunboat	Suicide boat	8	11
5 Apr 45	USS Nevada	Battleship	Coastal battery	2	16
6 Apr 45	USS Bush	Destroyer	Air attack, 3 kamikaze hits 2 between stacks, blew forward engine room, broke in half and sank	94	32
6 Apr 45	USS Colhoun	Destroyer	Air attack, 4 kamikaze hits, bombs blew forward, and aft fire rooms at waterline Sunk with gunfire by USS Cassin Young	35	21
6 Apr 45	USS Howorth	Destroyer	Air attack, kamikaze struck superstructure, fires put out	9	14
6 Apr 45	USS Hyman	Destroyer	Air attack, kamikaze Hampton hit torpedo tubes between smokestacks	10	40
6 Apr 45	#USS Leutze	Destroyer	Air attack, kamikaze blew at fantail, bad flooding	7	34
6 Apr 45	#USS Morris	Destroyer	Air attack, Nakajima B5N 'Kate' kamikaze portside	0	5
6 Apr 45	USS Mulaney	Destroyer	Air attack, kamikaze hit depth charges	13	45
6 Apr 45	#USS Newcomb	Destroyer	Air attack, multiple kamikazes	40	24
6 Apr 45	USS Haynsworth	Destroyer	Air attack, kamikaze	7	25
6 Apr 45	#USS Witter	Destroyer Escort	Starboard waterline kamikaze	0	5
6 Apr 45	USS Fieberling	Destroyer	Air attack, kamikaze near miss	6	6
6 Apr 45	USS Emmons	Destroyer Minesweeper	Air attack, 5 kamikaze hits, scuttled 7 April	64	71
6 Apr 45	USS Rodman	Destroyer Minesweeper	Air attack, 4 kamikaze hits	16	20
6 Apr 45	USS Defense	Small Minesweeper	Air attack, two kamikaze strikes	0	9
6 Apr 45	USS LST-447	Landing Ship	Air attack, kamikaze hit close above waterline, bomb blew. Sank	5	17
6 Apr 45	SS Hobbs Victory	Small Cargo	Air attack, kamikaze struck and caused fire. Cargo of ammunition exploded the following day and it sank	15	3
6 Apr 45	SS Logan Victory	Small Cargo	Air attack, kamikaze struck superstructure, flames ignited ammunition which exploded sinking ship	16	11
7 Apr 45	USS Hancock	Carrier	Air attack, cartwheeling kamikaze	72	82
7 Apr 45	USS Maryland	Battleship	Air attack, kamikaze hit starboard	16	37
7 Apr 45	USS Bennett	Destroyer	Air attack, kamikaze hit engine room	3	18
7 Apr 45	USS Wesson	Destroyer	Air attack, kamikaze starboard	8	23
7 Apr 45	*USS PGM-18	Small Gunboat	Mine, powerful explosion	14	14
7 Apr 45	*YMS-103	Small minesweeper	Mine, struck two mines, blowing off her bow and stem rescuing PGM-18	5	0
8 Apr 1945	USS Gregory	Destroyer	Air attack, port kamikaze amidships near waterline	0	2
8 Apr 45	USS YMS-92	Small Sweeper	Air attack	0	0
9 Apr 45	USS Charles J. Badger	Destroyer	Suicide Boat threw depth charge or mine	0	0
9 Apr 45	USS Sterett	Destroyer	Air attack, kamikaze hit starboard at waterline	0	9
9 Apr 45	USS Hopping	Destroyer Transport	Coastal Battery, damaging hits off Buckner Bay	2	18
11 Apr 45	USS Kidd	Destroyer	Air attack, kamikaze	38	55
12 Apr 45	USS Tennessee	Battleship	Air attack, kamikaze hit signal bridge	25	104
12 Apr 45	USS Mannert L. Abele	Destroyer	Air attack, kamikaze. Broke in two and sank	79	35
12 Apr 45	USS Purdy	Destroyer	Air attack, splashed kamikaze bomb skidded in	13	27
12 Apr 45	USS Cassin Young	Destroyer	Air attack, kamikaze hit foremast	1	59
12 Apr 45	USS Zellars	Destroyer	Air attack, kamikaze crashed port, bomb blew	29	37
12 Apr 45	USS Rall	Destroyer	Air attack, kamikaze starboard aft, bomb blew	21	38
12 Apr 45	USS Whitehurst	Destroyer Escort	Air attack, kamikaze w/bomb crashed pilot house	37	37
12 Apr 45	USS Lindsey	Destroyer Minelayer	Air attack, 2 kamikaze Aichi D3A 'Val' strikes	56	51
12 Apr 45	USS LSM(R)-189	Landing Ship	Air attack, kamikaze	0	4
12 Apr 45	*USS LCS(L)-33	Landing Craft	Air attack, kamikaze Val amidships	4	29
12 Apr 45	USS LCS(L)-57	Landing Craft	Air attack, three kamikaze strikes	2	6
14 Apr 45	USS Sigsbee	Destroyer	Air attack, kamikaze damaged port engine	4	74
16 Apr 45	USS Intrepid	Carrier	Air attack, kamikaze crashed deck, fires put out	10	87
16 Apr 45	USS Bryant	Destroyer	Air attack, kamikaze to bridge, w/explosion	34	33
16 Apr 45	USS Laffey	Destroyer	Air attack, multiple kamikaze hits	31	72
16 Apr 45	USS Pringle	Destroyer	Air attack, kamikaze Val hit abaft stack No. 1, explosion, broke in half and sank	65	110
16 Apr 45	USS Bowers	Destroyer Escort	Air attack, kamikaze to bridge, bomb hit pilot house	48	56
16 Apr 45	#USS Harding	Destroyer Minesweeper	Air attack, kamikaze struck side near bridge	22	10
16 Apr 45	USS Hobson	Destroyer Minesweeper	Air attack, near miss kamikaze's bomb veered in	4	8
16 Apr 45	USS LCS(L)-116	Landing Craft	Air attack, kamikaze hit aft gun mount	12	12
18 Apr 45	USS LSM-28	Landing Ship	Air attack	0	0
22 Apr 45	USS Isherwood	Destroyer	Air attack, kamikaze w/bomb crashed gun mount	42	41
22 Apr 45	USS Swallow	Small minesweeper	Air attack, kamikaze at waterline caused flooding, rapidly capsized and sank	2	9
22 Apr 45	USS LCS(L)-15	Landing Craft	Air attack	15	11
27 Apr 45	#USS Hutchins	Destroyer	Suicide Boat explosive blew close	0	0
27 Apr 45	#USS Rathburne	Destroyer	Air attack, kamikaze hit port bow waterline	0	0
27 Apr 45	SS Canada Victory	Small Cargo	Air attack while in port, kamikaze hit igniting cargo of ammunition and sank	12	27
28 Apr 45	USS Pinkney	Destroyer	Air attack, kamikaze hit aft of superstructure, lit ammo	35	12
28 Apr 45	USS Comfort	Hospital Ship	Air attack, kamikaze thru 3 decks to surgery	30	48
29 Apr 45	#USS Haggard	Destroyer	Air attack, kamikaze went thru hull, blew engine room	11	40
29 Apr 45	USS Hazelwood	Destroyer	Air attack, kamikaze Zero hit port bridge	46	26
29 Apr 45	#USS LCS(L)-37	Landing Craft	Suicide Boat	0	4
30 Apr 45	USS Terror	Minelayer	Air attack, kamikaze blew thru main deck	48	123
3 May 45	USS Little	Destroyer	Air attack, 5 kamikaze strikes. Broke up and sank	30	79
3 May 45	#USS Aaron Ward	Destroyer Minelayer	Air attack; 3 kamikaze hits and bomb frags	45	49
3 May 45	USS Macomb	Destroyer Minelayer	Air attack, kamikaze	7	14
3 May 45	USS LSM(R)-195	Landing Ship	Air attack, kamikaze hit rockets, sunk	8	16
4 May 45	USS Hopkins	Destroyer Minesweeper	Air attack, glancing blow by burning kamikaze	0	1
4 May 45	#USS Sangamon	Escort Carrier	Air attack, kamikaze & bomb blew thru flight deck	46	116
4 May 45	USS Birmingham	Light Cruiser	Air attack, kamikaze hit forward	51	81
4 May 45	USS Ingraham	Destroyer	Air attack, kamikaze above port waterline, bomb blew	14	37
4 May 45	USS Luce	Destroyer	Air attack, 1st kamikaze bomb hit, 2nd kamikaze struck aft. Sank with concurrent explosion	149	94
4 May 45	*USS Morrison	Destroyer	Air attack, 1st kamikaze hit bridge, then 3 more hit	159	102
4 May 45	USS Shea	Destroyer	Air attack Ohka kamikaze thru starboard bridge	27	91
4 May 45	USS Carina	Cargo Ship	Suicide Boat ramming caused explosion	0	6
4 May 45	*USS LSM(R)-190	Landing Ship supporting fire	Air attack, kamikaze set off her rockets	13	18
4 May 45	*USS LSM(R)-194	Landing Ship	Air attack	13	23
4 May 1945	HMS Formidable	Carrier	Air attack by single fighter. Bomb holed flight deck, damaged boiler room and set fires	8	55
9 May 45	#USS England	Destroyer	Air attack, kamikaze dive bomber	35	27
9 May 45	#USS Oberrender	Destroyer Escort	Air attack, kamikaze hit starboard gun mount, bomb thru main deck	8	53
11 May 45	USS Bunker Hill	Carrier	Air attack, 3 kamikaze hits with bombs thru flight deck	396	264
11 May 45	#USS Hugh W. Hadley	Destroyer	Air attack, Aft bomb, an Ohka, and 2 more kamikazes struck	28	67
11 May 45	#USS Evans	Destroyer	Air attack, Struck by 4 kamikazes, fires put out	30	29
11 May 45	USS LCS(L)-88	Landing Craft	Air attack	7	9
13 May 45	USS Enterprise	Fast Carrier	Air attack, 2 kamikazes, struck port, & under starboard bow	13	68
13 May 45	USS Bache	Destroyer	Air attack, kamikaze hit, bomb exploded amidships just above main deck	41	32
13 May 45	USS Bright	Destroyer Escort	Air attack, kamikaze Zero hit fantail, bomb exploded	0	2
17 May 45	USS Douglas H. Fox	Destroyer	2 kamikaze strikes, one to forward gun mounts, one to fantail	9	35
18 May 45	*USS Longshaw	Destroyer	Coastal Battery, 4 hits, one ignited magazine, blew off bow back to bridge	86	97
18 May 45	*USS LST-808	Landing Ship Tank	Air attack	11	11
20 May 45	#USS Chase	Destroyer Escort	Air attack, Splashed kamikaze skidded in, bombs opened hull, w/flooding	0	35
20 May 45	#USS Thatcher	Destroyer	Air attack, kamikaze Oscar struck aft of bridge, large hole	14	53
20 May 45	#USS John C. Butler	Destroyer Escort	Air attack, kamikaze hit to mast and antennas	0	0
25 May 45	USS Stormes	Destroyer	Air attack, crashed aft torpedo mount, bomb blew large hole, flooded aft	21	6
25 May 45	USS O'Neill	Destroyer Escort	Air attack, kamikaze	0	16
25 May 45	USS Butler	Destroyer Minesweeper	Air attack, kamikaze bombs exploded under keel	0	15
25 May 45	#USS Spectacle	Small Minesweeper	Air attack, kamikaze crashed port gun tub causing fires	29	6
25 May 45	*USS Barry	Destroyer Transport	Air attack, kamikaze badly crashed starboard side, fires, abandoned	0	30
25 May 45	*USS Bates	Destroyer	Air attack, 2 kamikaze hits, fires, abandoned, towed, later sank	21	35
25 May 45	USS Roper	Destroyer	Air attack, kamikaze hit off Hanagushi, Okinawa	1	10
25 May 45	*LSM-135	Landing Ship	Air attack, kamikaze caused fires, beached, abandoned	11	10
25 May 45	SS William B. Allison, aka USS Inca	Cargo Ship, Liberty Ship	Air attack, Aerial Torpedo off Nakagusuku Wan	8	2
27 May 45	USS Braine	Destroyer	Air attack, 2 kamikazes, 1st hit bridge, and 2nd hit amidships	66	78
27 May 45	#USS Forrest	Destroyer Minesweeper	Air attack, kamikaze crashed starboard side waterline	5	13
27 May 45	USS Rednour	Transport	Air attack, 2 kamikaze hits, one made 10-foot hole in main deck	3	13
27 May 45	USS Loy	Destroyer Escort	Air attack, kamikaze near miss sprayed fragments	3	15
27 May 45	LCS(L)-119	Landing Craft	Air attack	12	6
28 May 45	*USS Drexler	Destroyer Escort	Air attack, 1st kamikaze Frances hit topside, 2nd Frances w/bombs crashed superstructure	158	51
28 May 45	USS Sandoval	Attack Transport	Air attack, kamikaze hit portside of wheelhouse	8	26
29 May 45	USS Shubrick	Destroyer	Air attack, kamikaze bomb hit starboard causing hole, exploding depth charge	32	28
3 June 45	#USS LCI(L)-90	Landing Craft Infantry	Air attack, kamikaze	1	7
6 June 45	#USS J. William Ditter	Destroyer Minelayer	Air attack, 1st kamikaze glanced, 2nd hit port near main deck	10	27
6 Jun 45	USS Harry F. Bauer	Destroyer Minelayer	Air attack, kamikaze hit superstructure	0	0
10 Jun 45	*USS William D. Porter	Destroyer	Air attack, splashed kamikaze Val's bomb exploded close underwater	0	61
11 Jun 45	USS LCS(L)-122	Landing Craft	Air attack kamikaze hit conning tower base, bomb fragments caused fires	11	29
16 Jun 45	*USS Twiggs	Destroyer	Air attack, splashed kamikaze and bomb blew in hull plating, w/structural damage	126	34
21 Jun 45	USS Halloran	Destroyer Escort	Air attack, splashed kamikaze's bomb struck	3	24
21 Jun 45	USS Curtiss	Seaplane Tender	Air attack, kamikaze and bomb ripped 2 holes in hull and blew	41	28
21 Jun 45	*USS LSM-59	Landing Ship	Air attack, kamikaze strike while towing USS Barry, sank in 4 minutes	2	8
22 Jun 45	USS LSM-213	Landing Ship	Air attack, kamikaze strike at Kimmu Wan, hull damage	3	10
22 Jun 45	USS LST-534	Landing Ship Tank	Air attack, While offloading on Nagagusuku Wan, kamikaze hit bow doors, tank deck	3	35
29 Jul 45	*USS Callaghan	Destroyer	Air attack, bi-plane kamikaze hit, its bomb blew aft engine room, sunk	47	73
30 Jul 45	USS Cassin Young	Destroyer	Air attack, kamikaze hit forward, earlier hit April 12	22	45

== See also ==
- List of ships damaged by kamikaze attack
- List of Allied vessels struck by Japanese special attack weapons

== Bibliography ==
- Morison, Samuel Eliot (1960). Victory in the Pacific, 1945. History of United States Naval Operations in World War II. Vol. XIV. Boston: Little, Brown and Co. ISBN 0-7858-1315-2.
- Reilly, Robin L. (2013). American Amphibious Gunboats in World War II. Jefferson, North Carolina: McFarland & Company, Inc. ISBN 978-0-7864-7422-6.
- Silverstone, Paul H. (1970). U.S. Warships of World War II. Garden City, NY: Doubleday and Co. ISBN 0-8702-1773-9.
- Toll, Ian W. (2020). Twilight of the Gods, War in the Western Pacific 1944-45. New York, NY: Norton and Company. ISBN 978-0-393-08065-0.
