= List of Victory ships (T-V) =

This is a list of Victory ships with names beginning with T, U or V.

== Description ==
A Victory ship was a cargo ship. The cargo ships were 455 feet 3 inches (138.76 m) overall, 436 feet 6 inches (133.05 m) between perpendiculars They had a beam of 62 feet 0 inches (18.90 m), a depth of 38 feet 0 inches (11.58 m) and a draught of 28 feet 0 inches (8.53 m). They were assessed at 7,612 GRT, 4,555 NRT and 10,750 DWT.

The ships were powered by a triple expansion steam engine, driving a steam turbine via double reduction gear. This gave the ship a speed of 15.5 knots (28.7 km/h) or 16.5 knots (30.6 km/h), depending on the machinery installed.

Liberty ships had five holds. No. 1 hold was 57 feet 6 inches (17.53 m) long, with a capacity of 81,715 cubic feet (2,313.9 m^{3}), No. 2 hold was 45 feet 0 inches (13.72 m) long, with a capacity of 89,370 cubic feet (2,531 m^{3}), No. 3 hold was 78 feet 0 inches (23.77 m) long, with a capacity of 158,000 cubic feet (4,500 m^{3}), No. 4 hold was 81 feet 0 inches (24.69 m) long, with a capacity of 89,370 cubic feet (2,531 m^{3}) and No. 5 hold was 75 feet 0 inches (22.86 m) long, with a capacity of 81,575 cubic feet (2,309.9 m^{3}).

In wartime service, they carried a crew of 62, plus 28 gunners. The ships carried four lifeboats. Two were powered, with a capacity of 27 people and two were unpowered, with a capacity of 29 people.

== Talladega ==
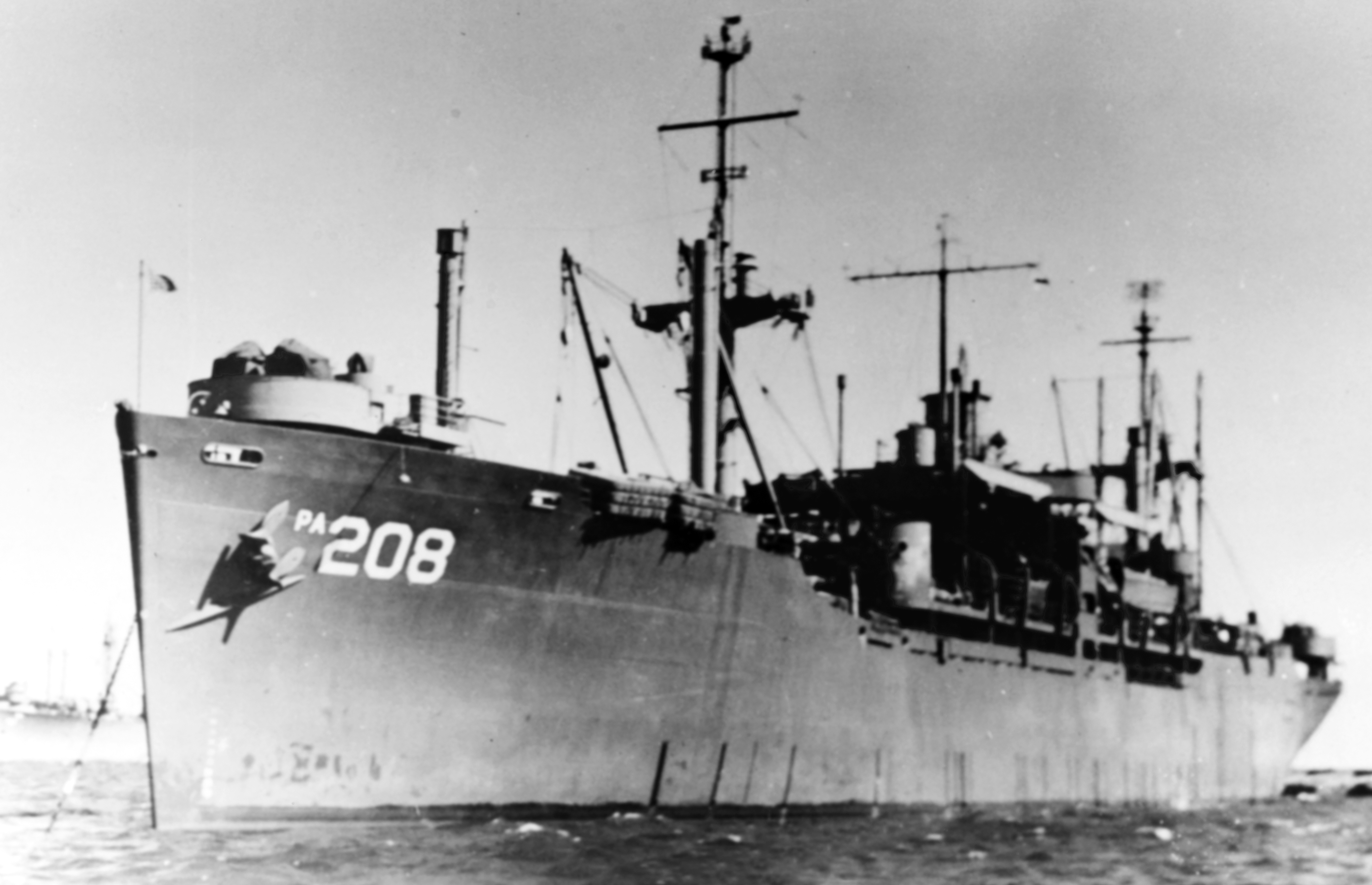
USS Talladega

Talladega was built by Permanente Metals Corporation, Richmond, California. Her keel was laid on 3 June 1944. She was launched on 17 August and delivered on 31 October. Built for the United States Navy. Decommissioned in 1946 and laid up in reserve. Recommissioned in 1951 due to the Korean War. Stricken in 1969 and laid up at Olympia, Washington. Transferred to Suisun Bay in 1972. She was scrapped in 1982.

== Taos Victory ==
Taos Victory was a troop transport built by California Shipbuilding Corporation, Terminal Island, Los Angeles, California. Her keel was laid on 6 November 1944. She was launched on 29 December and delivered on 31 January 1945. Built for the War Shipping Administration (WSA), she was operated under the management of American South African Line. To the Ministry of Transport, London, United Kingdom in 1946. Operated under the management of Furness, Withy & Co. Sold in 1948 to Donaldson Atlantic Line, Glasgow, United Kingdom. Converted to a cargo liner. Now 8,323 GRT. Intended to be renamed Cabotia but renamed Lismoria. Sold in 1966 to astroguardia Compania Navigation, Panama and renamed Neon. She arrived at Kaohsiung, Taiwan for scrapping in May 1967.

== Tazewell ==
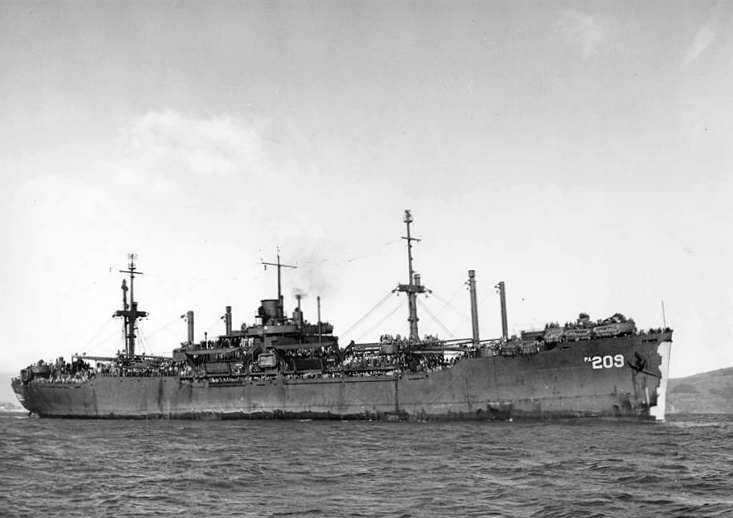
USS Tazewell

Tazewell was built by Permanente Metals Corporation. Her keel was laid on 2 June 1944. She was launched on 22 August and delivered on 25 October. Built for the United States Navy. Decommissioned in 1946 and laid up in reserve. To the United States Maritime Administration in 1958. Laid up an Olympia. She was sold to shipbreakers in Portland, Oregon in December 1972.

== Telfair ==
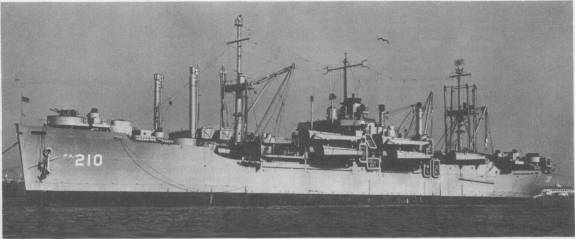
USS Telfair

Telfair was built by Permanente Metals Corporation. Her keel was laid on 30 May 1944. She was launched on 30 August and delivered on 31 October. Built for the United States Navy. Decommissioned in 1946 and laid up in reserve. Recommissioned in 1950 due to the Korean War. Laid up in Suisun Bay in 1958. To the United States Maritime Administration in 1960. Recommissioned in 1961. Returned to the United States Maritime Administration in 1968. She was scrapped at Baltimore, Maryland in August 1969.

== Temple Victory ==
Temple Victory was built by Oregon Shipbuilding Corporation, Portland, Oregon. Her keel was laid on 9 February 1945. She was launched on 27 March and delivered on 2 May. Built for the WSA, she was operated under the management of American Mail Line. Laid up in Suisun Bay in 1946. Sold in 1947 to India Steamship Co, Calcutta, India and renamed Indian Exporter. She caught fire at Tilbury, United Kingdom on 24 June 1956. Sold in 1977 to Pent-Ocean Steamships Ltd., Calcutta and renamed Samudra Usha. She was scrapped at Bombay, India in 1977.

== Terre Haute Victory ==
Terre Haute Victory was built by Oregon Shipbuilding Corporation. Her keel was laid on 22 December 1944. She was launched on 2 February 1945 and delivered on 10 March. Built for the WSA, she was operated under the management of Alaska Steamship Company. Sold in 1948 to American Export Lines, New York and renamed Exmouth. To the United States Department of Commerce in 1959. Leased back to American Export Lines. Laid up in the James River in 1961. She was scrapped at Kearny, New Jersey in 1976.

== Texarkana Victory ==
Texarkana Victory was a troop transport built by California Shipbuilding Corporation. Her keel was laid on 20 November 1944. She was launched on 11 January 1945 and delivered on 10 February. Built for the WSA, she was operated under the management of Oliver J. Olson & Company. Sold in 1947 to Compagnie Royale Belge-Argentina, Antwerp, Belgium and renamed Flandres. Operated under the management of Armament Deppe. She was driven ashore at Recife, Brazil on 2 November 1948. Declared a constructive total loss. Sold in 1949 to Wallem & Co., Panama and renamed Turan. Sold in 1950 to Holland-Amerika Lijn, Rotterdam, Netherlands and renamed Aagtedijk. Renamed Aagtedyk in 1955. She collided with the Swedish ship Citos in the Elbe on 25 February 1963 and was severely damaged. Declared a constructive total loss, she was scrapped at Hamburg, West Germany in April 1963.

== Towanda Victory ==
Towanda Victory was built by Bethlehem Fairfield Shipyard, Baltimore, Maryland. Her keel was laid on 23 September 1944. She was launched on 11 November and delivered on 7 December. Built for the WSA, she was operated under the management of Black Diamond Steamship Company. Laid up in the Hudson River in 1949. Later transferred to Suisun Bay. She was scrapped at Richmond in 1974.

== Trinidad Victory ==
Trinidad Victory was built by California Shipbuilding Corporation. Her keel was laid on 18 June 1945. She was launched on 21 August and delivered on 21 September. Built for the WSA, she was operated under the management of Marine Transport Line Inc. Laid up in Suisun Bay in 1946. Sold in 1948 to China Union Lines, Shanghai, China and renamed Chungking Victory. Later reflagged to Taiwan. On 8 April 1966, she rescued thirteen passengers from the burning Norwegian cruise ship Viking Princess, which had caught fire off the coast of Cuba. She was scrapped at Kaohsiung in 1978.

== Trinity Victory ==
Trinity Victory was built by Permanente Metals Corporation. Her keel was laid on 8 March 1945. She was launched on 18 April and delivered on 12 May. Built for the WSA, she was operated under the management of Marine Transport Line Inc. Laid up at Beaumont, Texas in 1948. She was scrapped at Panama City, Florida in January 1972.

== Tucson Victory ==
Tucson Victory was a troop transport built by California Shipbuilding Corporation. Her keel was laid on 17 May 1945. She was launched on 13 July and delivered on 17 August. Built for the WSA, she was operated under the management of American President Lines. Laid up at Beaumont in 1948. She was scrapped at Tuxpan, Mexico in 1994.

== Tufts Victory ==
Tufts Victory was a troop transport built by California Shipbuilding Corporation. Her keel was laid on 11 January 1945. She was launched on 2 March and delivered on 28 March. Built for the WSA, she was operated under the management of American Mail Line. Laid up in Suisun Bay in 1947. Sold later that year to Koninklijke Rotterdamsche Lloyd, Rotterdam and renamed Samarinda. Sold in 1962 to Far Eastern Navigation Corp., Keelung, Taiwan and renamed Chun Lee. Renamed Cherry Victory in 1964. She ran aground north of Sumatra, Indonesia (5°17′N 97°28′E) on 23 September 1969 whilst on a voyage from Mormugao, India to Keelung. She was refloated on 12 October and taken in to Penang, Malaysia. Declared uneconomic to repair, she was scrapped at Keelung in January 1970.

== Tulane Victory ==
Tulane Victory was built by Permanente Metals Corporation. Her keel was laid on 10 February 1945. She was launched on 28 March and delivered on 28 April. Built for the WSA, she was operated under the management of Mississippi Shipping Company. Laid up at Beaumont in 1949. Later transferred to the James River. She was scrapped at Alang, India in 1992.

== Tusculum Victory ==
Tusculum Victory was a troop transport built by Bethlehem Fairfield Shipyard. Her keel was laid on 30 April 1945. She was launched on 11 June and delivered on 10 July. Built for the WSA, she was operated under the management of A. L. Burbank & Company, Ltd. Chartered to the Ministry of War Transport, London in 1945 for use as a hospital ship. Operated under the management of Furness, Withy & Co. Sold to her managers in 1947 and renamed Pacific Stronghold. Sold in 1954 to Prince Line and renamed Malayan Prince. Operated under the management of her former owners. Sold in 1959 to Marine Bulk Carriers, New York and renamed Wang Knight. Renamed Marine Carrier later that year. Sold in 1960 to Elie V. Shipping Co., New York and renamed Elie V. Sold in 1964 to American Oceanic Corp., New York and renamed Oceanic Wave. Sold in 1966 to Oceanic Pioneer Steamship Co., Cleveland, Ohio. Sold in 1968 to Oswego Shipping Co., Cleveland and renamed Silver Falcon. She was scrapped at Kaohsiung in February 1970.

== Tuskegee Victory ==
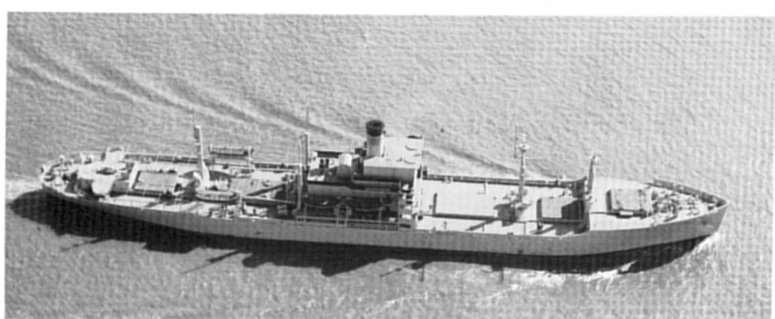
USNS Dutton

Tuskegee Victory was built by Oregon Shipbuilding Corporation. Her keel was laid on 27 March 1945. She was launched on 8 May and delivered on 5 June. Built for the WSA, she was operated under the management of Weyerhaeuser Steamship Company. Laid up at Beaumont in 1949. Later transferred to the James River. To the United States Navy in 1957 and renamed Dutton. Converted for naval use at Philadelphia Navy Yard. To the United States Maritime Administration in 1989 and laid up at Beaumont. She was scrapped at Brownsville in 2007–08.

== Twin Falls Victory ==
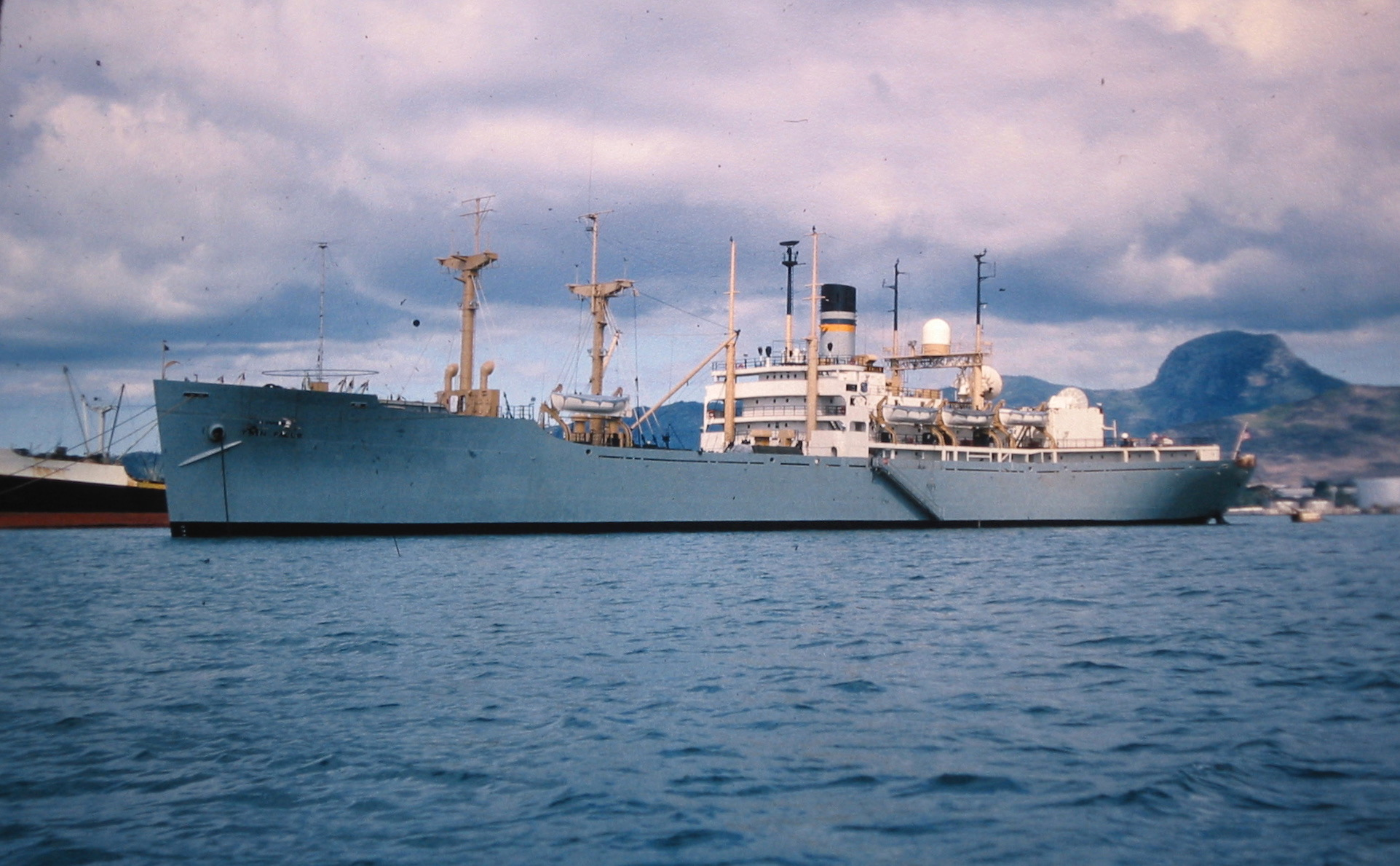
USNS Twin Falls

Twin Falls Victory was built by Oregon Shipbuilding Corporation. Her keel was laid on 27 December 1944. She was launched on 6 February 1945 and delivered on 4 April. Built for the WSA, she was operated under the management of McCormick Steamship Company. Laid up in Suisun Bay in 1948. Returned to service in 1950 due to the Korean War. Laid up in the James River in 1958. To Military Sea Transportation Service in 1962. Converted to a Missile Range Instrumentation Ship and renamed Twin Falls. Stricken in April 1970. To the United States Navy in April 1971. Conversion cancelled and she was laid up. Loaned to the City of New York in 1972 and renamed John Brown II. Used as a school ship. She was scrapped at Kearny in 1983.

== Union Victory ==
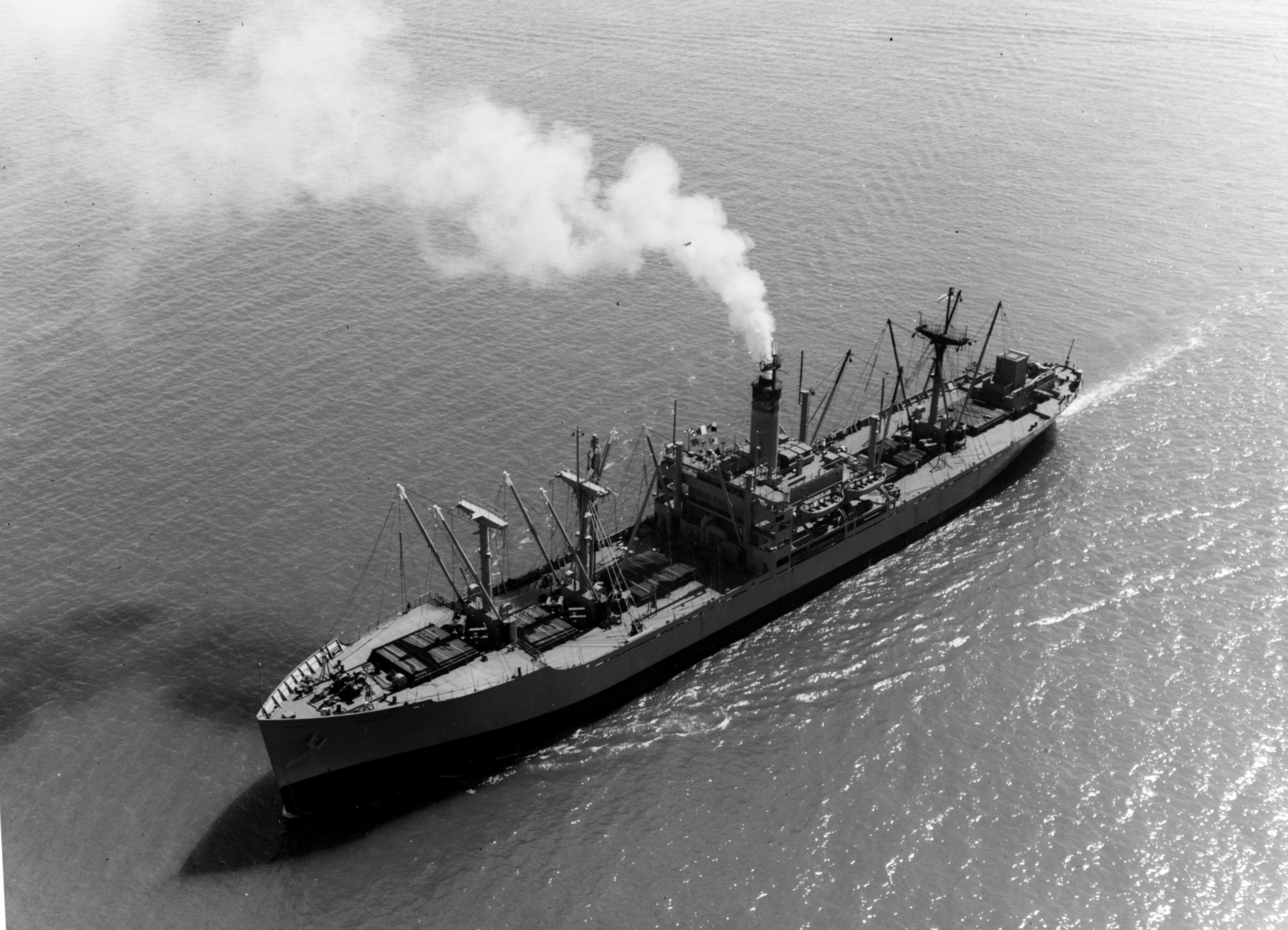
USNS Perseus

Union Victory was built by Oregon Shipbuilding Corporation. Her keel was laid on 30 March 1945. She was launched on 11 May and delivered on 8 June. Built for the WSA, she was operated under the management of Alaska Transportation Company. Laid up at Beaumont in 1948. Returned to service in 1950 due to the Korean War. Laid up at Olympia in 1953. To Military Sea Transportation Service in 1962 and renamed Perseus. Converted to a refrigerated store ship by Willamette Iron and Steel Company, Portland, Oregon. She was scrapped at Kaohsiung in 1974.

== United Victory ==
United Victory was built by Oregon Shipbuilding Corporation. Her keel was laid on 19 November 1943. She was launched on 12 January 1944 and delivered on 29 February. Built for the WSA, she was operated under the management of American President Lines. Sold in 1946 to Renfrew Navigation Co., Renfrew, United Kingdom. Operated under the management of Furness, Withy & Co. Renamed Khedive Ismail in 1947. Sold in 1948 to Khedive Mail Line. Converted to a passenger ship. Now 8,193 GRT. Sold in 1961 to United Arab Maritime Co., Alexandria. Sold in 1974 to The Egyptian Navigation Co., Alexandria. She was scrapped at Gadani Beach, Pakistan in 1984.

== United States Victory ==
United States Victory was a troop transport built by California Shipbuilding Corporation. Her keel was laid on 9 January 1944. She was launched on 6 March and delivered on 30 April. Built for the WSA, she was operated under the management of Weyerhaeuser Steamship Company. Laid up in Suisun Bay in 1946. Sold in 1947 to India Steamship Co., Calcutta and renamed Indian Shipper. She was scrapped at Kaohsiung in May 1971.

== U.S.S.R. Victory ==
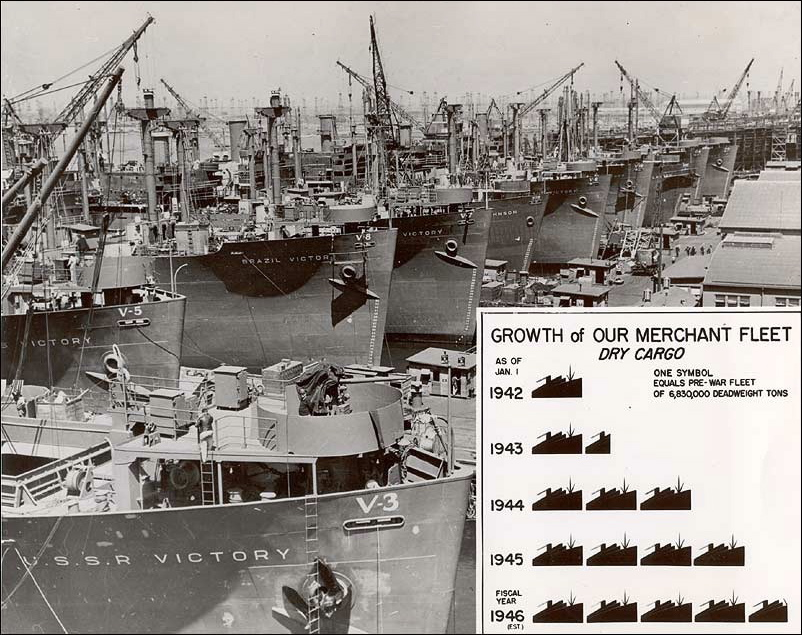
U.S.S.R. Victory

U.S.S.R. Victory was a troop transport built by California Shipbuilding Corporation. Her keel was laid on 3 January 1944. She was launched on 26 February and delivered on 26 April. Built for the WSA, she was operated under the management of Moore-McCormack Lines. Sold in 1947 to India Steamship Co. and renamed Indian Navigator. An onboard explosion occurred on 31 December 1960 when she was 60 nautical miles (110 km) off the Isles of Scilly, United Kingdom whilst on a voyage from Liverpool, United Kingdom to Calcutta. Her crew were rescued. She was taken under tow by Indian Success. A salvage party that had been put aboard was lost when Indian Navigator foundered on 2 January 1961.

== Valdosta Victory ==
Valdosta Victory was built by Bethlehem Fairfield Shipyard. Her keel was laid on 19 October 1944. She was launched on 11 December and delivered on 15 January 1945. Built for the WSA, she was operated under the management of Seas Shipping Company. Laid up in Suisun Bay in 1947. She was scrapped at Kaohsiung in 1984.

== Vanderbilt Victory ==
Vanderbilt Victory was built by California Shipbuilding Corporation. Her keel was laid on 16 February 1945. She was launched on 11 April and delivered on 4 May. Built for the WSA, she was operated under the management of Lykes Brothers Steamship Company. Laid up at Wilmington, North Carolina in 1948. Later transferred to the James River. She was scrapped at Alang in 1993.

== Vassar Victory ==
Vassar Victory was built by Bethlehem Fairfield Shipyard. Her keel was laid on 19 March 1945. She was launched on 3 May and delivered on 28 May. Built for the WSA, she was operated under the management of A. H. Bull & Company. Laid up in the James River in 1946. Sold in 1947 to Società Italiano Trasporti Marittima, Rome, Italy and renamed Castelbianco. Renamed Castel Bianco in 1952. Converted to a passenger ship at Trieste, Italy. Now 10,023 GRT. Sold in 1957 to Compania Transatlantica Española and renamed Begona. A further refit followed, now 10,139 GRT. In August 1970, she took off the 660 passengers from the Victory ship Montserrat, which had suffered electrical and boiler damaged 1,200 nautical miles (2,200 km) north east of Barbados. She was scrapped at Castellón de la Plana, Spain in 1975.

== Villanova Victory ==
Villanova Victory was built by California Shipbuilding Corporation. Her keel was laid on 2 March 1945. She was launched on 27 April and delivered on 19 May. Built for the WSA, she was operated under the management of Coastwise Line. Laid up in the Hudson River in 1948. Sold in 1949 to Isbrandtsen Co., New York and renamed Brooklyn Heights. To American Export Lines, New York in 1962. To American Export-Isbrandtsen Lines, New York in 1964. Sold in 1969 to Valmar Shipping Agency Ltd., New York and renamed Northern Star. She was scrapped at Kaohsiung in March 1970.

== Virginia City Victory ==
Virginia City Victory was built by Permanente Metals Corporation. Her keel was laid on 31 October 1944. She was launched on 31 December and delivered on 31 January 1945. Built for the WSA, she was operated under the management of American President Line. Laid up in the Hudson River in 1948. Later transferred to Mobile. She was converted to a floating drydock by Gulf Tampa Drydock Company, Tampa, Florida in October 1971.
