= SS Cuba Victory =

Victory ship of the United States

- A typical Victory ship

History

United States
- Name: SS Cuba Victory
- Namesake: Cuba
- Ordered: as a Type VC2-S-AP2 hull, MCV hull 530
- Builder: Permanente Metals Corporation, Richmond, California
- Laid down: 31 March 1944
- Launched: 27 June 1944
- Commissioned: 19 August 1944
- Honors and awards: Battle Stars WW2
- Fate: Scrapped 1985

General characteristics
- Class & type: Victory ship
- Displacement: 4,480 long tons (4,550 t) (standard); 15,580 long tons (15,830 t) (full load)
- Length: 455 ft (139 m)
- Beam: 62 ft (19 m)
- Draft: 29 ft 2 in (8.89 m)
- Installed power: 2 × Babcock & Wilcox header-type boilers, 525psi 750°; 6,000 shp (4,500 kW)
- Propulsion: 1 × Westinghouse turbine; double Westinghouse Main Reduction Gears; 1 × shaft
- Speed: 15.5 kn (17.8 mph; 28.7 km/h)
- Capacity: 7,800 t (7,700 long tons) DWT; 453,210 cu ft (12,833 m^{3}) (non-refrigerated)
- Armament: 1 × 5 in (127 mm)/38-caliber dual-purpose gun; 1 × 3 in (76 mm)/50-caliber dual-purpose gun; 8 × 20 mm (0.8 in) Oerlikon cannons anti-aircraft (AA) mounts

SS Cuba Victory was built and operated as Victory ship class cargo ship which operated as a cargo carrier in World War II, Korean War and Vietnam War.

== Construction ==
Cuba Victory was laid down under U.S. Maritime Commission contract by Permanente Metals Corporation, Richmond, California on 31 March 1944, under the Emergency Shipbuilding program. She was launched on 27 June 1944 and was delivered to the War Shipping Administration (WSA) on 19 August 1944.

The SS Cuba Victory was used near the end of World War II. The ship's United States Maritime Commission designation was VC2-S-AP3, hull number P No. 1 (530), Victory #530. The Maritime Commission turned her over to a civilian contractor for operation. Victory ships were designed to replace the earlier Liberty Ships. Liberty ships were designed to be used just for WW2. Victory ships were designed to last longer and serve the US Navy after the war. The Victory ship differed from a Liberty ship in that they were: faster, longer and wider, taller, with a thinner stack set farther toward the superstructure and had a long raised forecastle.

== World War II ==
During World War II Cuba Victory operated as a merchantman and was chartered to the Mississippi Shipping Company. With a civilian crew and United States Navy Armed Guard to man the ship guns. SS Cuba Victory served in the Pacific Ocean in World War II as part of the Pacific War. SS Cuba Victory Naval Armed Guard crews earned "Battle Stars" in World War II for the assault occupation of Okinawa. Cuba Victory used its guns to defend herself and other ships at Okinawa. Three Victory ships at Okinawa sank: SS Canada Victory, SS Logan Victory and SS Hobbs Victory. Cuba Victory and other ships were attached April 27, 1945, in the Battle of Okinawa. On 12 May 1945 at night in fog on her way back home, the Cuba Victory, about a 100 miles from the remote US Navy base at Ulithi, collided with the ammunition ship SS Saginaw Victory. The damage to both ships was substantial. The two ships went to the Truk Island (now called Chuuk Lagoon) to have the damages checked. An escort ship took the two ships back to Ulithi. The Cuba Victory was repaired and put back into service.

== Post World War II ==
Many wanting to escape the war damaged Europe and find new opportunities to work traveled to Argentina after World War II. The Cuba Victory made two trips from Europe to the Port of Buenos Aires, Argentina. Cuba Victory docked at the port on 29 August 1946 and again on 4 January 1947 with new immigrants. After the war in 1948 the Cuba Victory was laid up at Beaumont, Texas, in the reserve fleet there.

== Korean War ==
For the Korean War the Cuba Victory was removed from the reserve fleet and put back in service. She was operated by the Moore-McCormack cargo line. SS Cuba Victory served as merchant marine naval ship supplying goods for the Korean War. About 75 percent of the personnel taken to Korea for the Korean War came by the merchant marine ships. The SS Cuba Victory transported goods, mail, food and other supplies. About 90 percent of the cargo was moved by merchant marine naval to the Korean war zone. SS Cuba Victory made trips between 1950 and 1952 helping American forces engaged against Communist aggression in South Korea. After the war she was returned to the reserve fleet.

== Vietnam War ==
In 1966 the Cuba Victory was reactivated for the Vietnam War. On 24 May 1868 while unloading ammunition at Cat Lai in upper part of the Saigon River in the Nhà Bè District, she was hit by a Viet Cong artillery shell and suffered significant damage. The attack killed three dockworkers and two tugboat crew. The USS Mataco (AT-86) a Navajo-class fleet tug towed her down the river. Cuba Victory returned to Beaumont reserve fleet. In The 1985 Cuba Victory was scrapped in Brownsville, Texas.

== See also ==
- List of Victory ships
- Liberty ship
- Type C1 ship
- Type C2 ship
- Type C3 ship

== Sources ==
- Sawyer, L.A. and W.H. Mitchell. Victory ships and tankers: The history of the ‘Victory’ type cargo ships and of the tankers built in the United States of America during World War II, Cornell Maritime Press, 1974, 0-87033-182-5.
- United States Maritime Commission:
- Victory Cargo Ships
