= SS Berea Victory =

Victory ship of the United States

- Typical Victory ship

History

United States
- Operator: Weyerhaeuser Steamship Company
- Builder: Permanente Metals, plant No. 2
- Laid down: 20 January 1945
- Launched: 3 March 1945
- Completed: 28 March 1945
- Fate: Scrapped in 1993

General characteristics
- Class & type: VC2-S-AP3 Victory ship
- Tonnage: 7,612 GRT, 4,553 NRT
- Displacement: 15,200 tons
- Length: 455 ft (139 m)
- Beam: 62 ft (19 m)
- Draught: 28 ft (8.5 m)
- Installed power: 8,500 shp (6,300 kW)
- Propulsion: HP & LP turbines geared to a single 20.5-foot (6.2 m) propeller
- Speed: 16.5 knots (30.6 km/h; 19.0 mph)
- Boats & landing craft carried: 4 lifeboats
- Complement: 62 Merchant Marine and 28 US Naval Armed Guards
- Armament: 1 × 5-inch (127 mm)/38 caliber gun; 1 × 3-inch (76 mm)/50 caliber gun; 8 × 20 mm Oerlikon

SS Berea Victory (MCV-734) was a type VC2-S-AP2 Victory-class cargo ship built for the United States during World War II. The ship was built as part of the Emergency Shipbuilding program by Permanente Metals Corporation in Yard 2 of the Richmond Shipyards in Richmond, California. Launched on 3 March 1945, the Berea Victory delivered supplies for the Pacific War.

Berea Victory's keel was laid on January 20, 1945, before being christened on March 28, 1945. The Berea Victory was a US Maritime Administration armed cargo ship. She was named for Berea College in Berea, Kentucky as one of 150 educational institutions which had Victory ships named after them. Constructed for the US Maritime Commission (MARCOM), this 10,600-ton ship was built at the Oregon Shipbuilding yards in just 67 days. The ship was operated by the Weyerhaeuser Steamship Company. under the United States Merchant Marine act for the War Shipping Administration.

Victory ships were designed to replace the earlier Liberty ships. Liberty ships were intended to be used solely for World War II. In contrast, Victory ships were built to last longer and serve the US Navy after the war. The Victory ship differed from a Liberty ship in that they were faster, longer, wider, taller, and had a thinner stack set farther toward the superstructure and a long raised forecastle.

== World War II ==
For World War II the Berea Victory was operated by the Weyerhaeuser SS Company. She had United States Navy Armed Guard to man the deck guns. She took cargo to support troops in the Pacific War. The goods were for the Battle of Okinawa operations, that lasted from 1 April until 22 June 1945. The SS Berea Victory had the dangerous job as being an ammunition ship for the Battle of Okinawa. 27 May 1945 Berea Victory depart Luzon to Nakagusuku Bay, Okinawa with ammunition. The ships: SS Kota Agoeng, SS Cape Constance and SS Greenville Victory were in her convoy. From Nakagusuku Bay she move to Yonabaru as the troops there were low of ammo. The XXIV Corps Ordnance officer unload her 7,200 tons of ammunition with barges, LCMs-Landing Craft Mechanized and LCTs-Landing craft tank. The quick amphibian unloading and delivery aided in the completion of the invasion. On April 6, 1945, the ammunition ships SS Logan Victory and SS Hobbs Victory sank after kamikaze attack planes hit them. On April 27, 1945, the ammunition ships SS Canada Victory, sank after a kamikaze attack. The loss of the three ammunition Victory ships severely hurt the combat forces. These ships were carrying a total of 24,000 tons (54 million pounds) of ammunition; including most of the 81 mm mortar shells needed for the invasion. SS Saginaw Victory and the Berea Victory were the only ammunition ship to survive, Saginaw Victory was able to unload all her ammunition over 12 days with the help of a Naval Construction Battalion. More ammunition ships were not needed as the war came to an end without the invasion of Japan, called Operation Downfall. Forty-seven ships were sunk by kamikaze attack during World War II.

In 1946 she was operated by the Pan-Atlantic to move post war goods.

After the war in 1948 she was laid up in the National Defense Reserve Fleet at Hudson River, and later transferred to Suisun Bay.

== Korean War ==
Berea Victory served as a merchant marine ship supplying ammunition for the Korean War. About 75 percent of the personnel serving in the Korean War were delivered by the merchant marine ships. Berea Attorney transported goods, mail, and other supplies. About 90 percent of the cargo was moved by merchant marine ships to the war zone. Berea Victory made trips between 1951 and 1952. At 9am in Suyong, Korea, on 14 August 1951 Colonel Mattis saw smoke rising from #5 hatch of the Berea Victory as she was being unloaded in the harbor. Colonel Mattis took a small boat and found a lit parachute-flare in the ship's hold. Later it was found that a Korean laborer had put it there. The ship's hold had 575 tons of flares, bombs, and other ammunition. Colonel Mattis went down in the smoke-filled hold and removed the burning flare saving the ship. Following his actions others joined to put out the fire. Later Lieutenant Colonel Mattis was awarded a medal for he actions.

== Vietnam War ==
Berea Victory was removed from the reserve fleet in 1966 and chartered to ferry military equipment to American forces in South Vietnam for the Vietnam War. Berea Victory has the dangerous job of delivering ammunition. It took her 21 days to travel from San Francisco to Saigon. She took supplies to Qui Nhơn in central Vietnam. On 25 Oct. 1967, while docked at Qui Nhon, Vietnamese civilians placed bombs in a hold. The explosion and fire killed 12 men in LCM and 5 Army on the ship. 10 Army men and 10 merchant seamen were wounded.

In 1993 she removed from the reserve fleet and was scrapped in China.

== See also ==
- List of Victory ships
- Liberty ship
- Type C1 ship
- Type C2 ship
- Type C3 ship

== Sources ==
- Sawyer, L. A. and W. H. Mitchell. Victory ships and tankers: The history of the 'Victory' type cargo ships and of the tankers built in the United States of America during World War II, Cornell Maritime Press, 1974, 0-87033-182-5.
- United States Maritime Commission:
- Victory Cargo Ships
