= SS Columbia Eagle incident =

1970 US ship hijacking

- Date: 14 March – 8 April 1970 (56 years ago)
- Location: Gulf of Thailand
- Type: Mutiny
- Cause: Objection to the Vietnam War
- Motive: Prevent napalm delivery
- Target: SS Columbia Eagle
- Perpetrators: Alvin Leonard Glatkowski; Clyde William McKay Jr.
- Outcome: Ship returned to U.S. control; Glatowski later surrendered, extradited to U.S.; McKay stayed in Cambodia, remains identified in 1991
- Deaths: None
- Convicted: Alvin Leonard Glatkowski
- Convictions: Mutiny and assault
- Sentence: Up to 10 years in federal prison

The SS Columbia Eagle incident refers to a mutiny that occurred aboard the U.S. flagged merchant vessel Columbia Eagle in March 1970 when two members of the crew seized the vessel with the threat of a bomb and handguns.

The ship was under contract with the Military Sea Transportation Service to carry napalm bombs to be used by the U.S. Air Force during the Vietnam War and was originally bound for Sattahip, Thailand. During the mutiny, 24 of the crew were forced into two lifeboats and set adrift in the Gulf of Thailand while the remainder of the crew were forced to take the ship to a bay near Sihanoukville, Cambodia. The two mutineers requested political asylum from the Cambodian government, which was initially granted, but they were later arrested and jailed. Columbia Eagle was returned to U.S. control in April 1970.

== Background ==
=== Columbia Eagle ===
Example Victory ship

The Columbia Eagle was a Victory-type cargo ship constructed by the Oregon Shipbuilding Corporation of Portland, Oregon, in 1945 for the U.S. Navy and originally christened Pierre Victory. She was designed to carry all types of dry supplies and munitions throughout the Pacific theater during World War II. Pierre Victory survived three separate kamikaze attacks by the Japanese in 1945.

After World War II, Pierre Victory was converted to a livestock ship, also called a seagoing cowboys ship. Pierre Victory made six trips with 780 horses on each trip to war-torn Poland and Greece. Pierre Victory served as merchant marine ship supplying goods for the Korean War. Like most of the ships of the Victory-type, Pierre Victory was decommissioned after the war and then sold to a commercial shipping company.

In 1968, she was purchased by the Columbia Steamship Company, renamed Columbia Eagle and contracted out to the Military Sea Transportation Service for the purpose of hauling supplies and ammunition to Southeast Asian ports in South Vietnam and Thailand during the Vietnam War. Because Columbia Eagle was a U.S. flagged ship, she was a part of the Merchant Marine fleet and therefore eligible under government contracting rules to haul military supplies to the war zone.

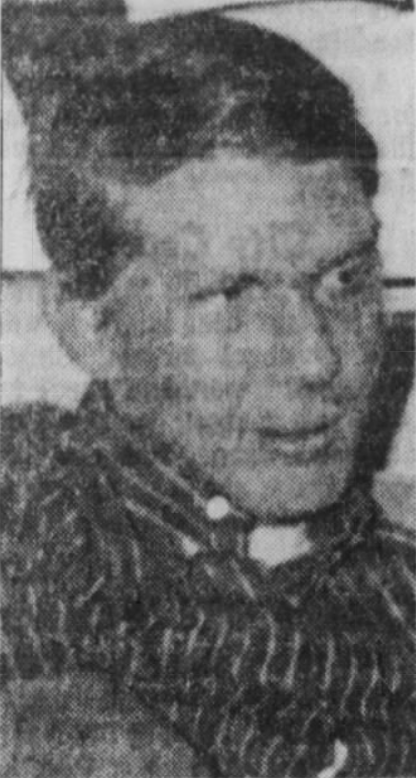
McKay

=== Clyde William McKay Jr. ===
Clyde McKay was born on 20 May 1944 near Hemet, California. His father was in the military then and often had duty away from the family. While a teenager, he suffered a misdiagnosed bowel obstruction and was seriously ill for a year. Because of this, he lost a year in school. He never finished high school, and decided to join the merchant marine. McKay received his merchant marine documents on 23 October 1963 and joined the Seafarers International Union shortly thereafter.

=== Alvin Leonard Glatkowski ===
Alvin Glatkowski was born on 11 September 1949 in Augusta, Georgia. His father was also in the military at the time of his birth but shortly after Glatkowski was born, his father abandoned the family. His mother married a Navy third-class machinist mate named Ralph Hagan when Glatkowski was three. Hagan was abusive to Glatkowski when he was home, but was often on duty or cruises and Glatkowski learned to be independent at an early age. As a teenager, Glatkowski assumed the role of head of the household when Hagan was at sea and this made Hagan very angry when he returned home. He often took out his frustrations on Glatkowski violently, which led him to leave home at sixteen. Glatkowski went to New York and enrolled in the Seafarers Harry Lundeberg School of Seamanship operated by the Seafarers International Union. Lundeberg School teaches the skills needed to get deck, engine and steward jobs on merchant marine ships. On 17 April 1967, Glatkowski received his merchant mariner papers stating he was eligible for entry-level jobs on U.S.-flagged ships.

== Timeline of the mutiny ==
=== Planning ===
McKay and Glatkowski had been considering the operation for some time but had little in the way of a plan with the exception of bringing handguns on board.

McKay and Glatowski had planned their action to ensure that they would involve the fewest possible crew, knowing full well that they were risking their freedom if not their lives. In order to give themselves the maximum amount of time to secure the ship and their freedom, they planned their action to take place immediately after the daily radio communication of the ship's location, ensuring they had 24 hours before the ship's change of course would be officially noticed.

=== Seizing control of Columbia Eagle ===
Locations of Sattahip and Bangkok in Thailand, and Sihanoukville and Phnom Penh in Cambodia

On 14 March 1970, McKay and Glatkowski used guns they had smuggled aboard to seize control of their ship, Columbia Eagle, in the first mutiny aboard an American ship in a century. (Note: The Nantucket-based whaler Globe suffered a mutiny in 1824, facilitated by the use of bladed weapons and a musket.) The ship had been sailing on a Department of Defense supply charter carrying napalm to the U.S. Air Force bases in Thailand for use in the Vietnam War. Her destination was Sattahip, a port at the southern tip of Chonburi province, southeast of Bangkok.

In order to involve the fewest crew members during the mutiny, McKay and Glatkowski decided that triggering a fire drill would be a good time to get most of the crew off the ship. After triggering the fire alarm, all but a few crew members took position in lifeboats, as per fire protocol. McKay and Glatowski then took the captain hostage and, claiming that they had a live bomb on board the ship, they demanded that the captain order severing the lifeboat lines, leaving 24 of the crewmen in the lifeboats. By taking action right after the daily radio communication of the ship's location, they ensured that the crew on the lifeboats would be found and rescued. The ship's cargo, 3,500 500-pound (230 kg) bombs, and 1,225 750-pound (340 kg) bombs, provided leverage and credibility to the bomb threat.

=== SOS and response ===
When the crewmen departed in lifeboats, an SOS was transmitted. A Lockheed P-3B Orion from VP-1 Crew 6, the "Scalp Hunters", operating from U-Tapao Royal Thai Navy Airfield, Thailand, was directed to launch a search and rescue (SAR) mission to find Columbia Eagle and assist as needed. Upon arrival at the ship, they found a small crew and the presence of small arms and immediately reported their assessment that the ship had been hijacked and was heading for Cambodia. Crew 6 maintained communications and status reporting until the ship anchored in Cambodian waters. Afterward, they were relieved and other P-3 Orion aircrews kept Columbia Eagle under constant surveillance from outside Cambodian territorial waters.

The merchant ship Rappahanock picked up the lifeboats and crew members and broadcast the news of the mutiny.

=== Pursuit and asylum ===
The United States Coast Guard cutter Mellon was the first U.S. military vessel to pursue Columbia Eagle. The amphibious transport dock USS Denver was diverted to relieve Mellon in its pursuit. The destroyer, USS Turner Joy, was detached from the station at I Corps to pursue Columbia Eagle at flank speed and to intervene. However, Columbia Eagle reached Cambodian waters before any U.S. naval ships could intercept it.

With only 13 crewmen remaining aboard besides the mutineers, the mutineers directed Columbia Eagle into Cambodian waters, where they assumed they would be welcomed as heroes. On the afternoon of 15 March, they anchored within the 12 nautical miles (22 km; 14 mi) territorial limit claimed by Cambodia, in a bay near Sihanoukville.

At 09:51 on 16 March, Denver anchored 15.6 nautical miles (28.9 km; 18.0 mi) from the coast in the Gulf of Siam, remaining outside Cambodian waters. Mellon joined shortly thereafter with Commander, Amphibious Squadron Seven, as the senior officer present. Two CH-53 Sea Stallion helicopters landed on Denver from bases in South Vietnam to assist in visual surveillance. Meanwhile, the mutineers had turned the ship over to Cambodia's Prince Norodom Sihanouk's government, declared themselves anti-war revolutionaries, and been granted asylum.

=== Cambodian coup of 1970 ===
On 17 March, the helicopters were detached and Denver, with Commander, Amphibious Squadron Seven, departed for Singapore, passing on-scene command to Mellon. Turner Joy remained on station in a cruising pattern within shipping lanes and in sight of the harbor channel.

On 18 March at 06:36, Denver reversed her course; Prince Sihanouk had been deposed by a coup led by the pro-U.S. Sirik Matak and Lon Nol. If the Cambodians could be persuaded to release Columbia Eagle, Denver's flight deck could help the rescued crew members rejoin their ship. The coup was unfortunate for mutineers McKay and Glatkowski, as they had hoped to find asylum in a pro-Communist country; instead, they became prisoners of the new Cambodian government. At 23:59 on 18 March, Denver anchored in the Gulf of Siam 17 nautical miles (31 km; 20 mi) from the coast of Cambodia.

Prince Sihanouk, now in exile, charged that the Central Intelligence Agency (CIA) had masterminded the mutiny to deliver weapons to Lon Nol. Both the mutineers and U.S. officials denied his charges. When it became clear that Columbia Eagle's release was not imminent, Denver was detached to proceed to Da Nang.

=== Return of Columbia Eagle ===
On 8 April, Columbia Eagle was permitted to leave Cambodian waters. She rendezvoused with USCGC Chase where a Navy explosive ordnance disposal team inspected the ship while Chase departed to An Thoi Naval Base to pick up the Columbia Eagle crew and return them to the ship. With the crew and ship reunited, Chase escorted her to U.S. Naval Base Subic Bay arriving 12 April.

== Later events ==
McKay and Glatkowski were held by the post-coup Cambodian government for several months after their capture. A United Press International newspaper interview from August 1970 describes them as living under guard in "a rusting World War II landing ship moored in the Mekong River," regularly using marijuana supplied by their guards, and making statements supporting the Manson Family and violent overthrow of the United States government. Both claimed they supported Students for a Democratic Society.

McKay said to a reporter:

We are sympathetic with the Asian people and, while I'm not an authority on the war in Vietnam I respect the opinions of people who were authorities like Bertrand Russell and Jean Paul Sartre who said the war in Asia was genocide. ... I intend to carry on my actions against the American Government.

In June, both men were indicted by a federal grand jury in Los Angeles on charges of mutiny, kidnapping and assault.

=== Glatkowski ===
After months of imprisonment Glatowski was released and, after seeking asylum at the Chinese and USSR embassies, he turned himself in at a US Embassy in Phnom Penh and was extradited to the United States to face trial. He was charged with mutiny, kidnapping, assault and neglect of duty. On 2 March 1971 Glatkowski pled guilty in a Los Angeles District Court to mutiny and assault. United States federal judge Manuel Real heard the testimony of four psychiatrists; three of the psychiatrists reported that Glatkowski was currently sane and was sane at the time of the mutiny incident. Glatowski was sentenced to 6 months to 10 years in federal prison and served nearly eight of the ten years when mandatorily released from Federal Correctional Institution, Lompoc, in Lompoc, California. He has admitted to mistakes in the hijacking but remained unapologetic about their goal of interrupting the napalm shipment.

=== McKay ===
McKay escaped from his captors, along with U.S. Army deserter Larry Humphrey, in November 1970 and sought out the Khmer Rouge. He was officially declared accounted for on 11 June 2003, with a date of loss on 4 November 1970, the day he was declared absent without leave (AWOL).

In a magazine article entitled "The Last Mutineer," co-authors Richard Linnett and Roberto Loiederman of the book The Eagle Mutiny described human remains brought from Cambodia in 1991; originally thought to be of missing photojournalists Sean Flynn and Dana Stone, the remains were positively identified as Clyde McKay's at the U.S. military's Central Identification Laboratory in Hawaii. The remains were subsequently cremated and the ashes buried by his family in their cemetery plot in Hemet, California, where McKay had spent his youth.

=== Columbia Eagle ===
The ship was scrapped in 1971 at Kaohsiung, Taiwan.

== Sources ==
- Cutler, Deborah W. and Thomas J. Cutler (2005). Dictionary of Naval Terms. Annapolis, Maryland: Naval Institute Press. ISBN 1-59114-150-8.
- Linnett, Richard and Roberto Loiederman (2001). The Eagle Mutiny. Annapolis, Maryland: Naval Institute Press. ISBN 1-55750-522-5.
