= SS Brainerd Victory =

Victory ship of the United States

- Typical Victory ship

History

United States
- Name: Brainerd Victory
- Namesake: Brainerd, Minnesota
- Owner: War Shipping Administration
- Operator: Weyerhaeuser Steamship Company
- Builder: Oregon Shipbuilding
- Laid down: July 25, 1945
- Launched: October 24, 1945
- Completed: November 23, 1945
- Fate: Sank 1964 with loss of 4 crewmen near Bermuda
- Notes: Last Victory Ship built at Oregon Shipbuilding

General characteristics
- Class & type: VC2-S-AP3 Victory ship
- Tonnage: 7612 GRT, 4,553 NRT
- Displacement: 15,200 tons
- Length: 455 ft (139 m)
- Beam: 62 ft (19 m)
- Draught: 28 ft (8.5 m)
- Installed power: 8,500 shp (6,300 kW)
- Propulsion: HP & LP turbines geared to a single 20.5-foot (6.2 m) propeller
- Speed: 16.5 knots
- Boats & landing craft carried: 4 Lifeboats
- Complement: 62 Merchant Marine and 28 US Naval Armed Guards
- Armament: 1 × 5 inch (127 mm)/38 caliber gun; 1 × 3 inch (76 mm)/50 caliber gun; 8 × 20 mm Oerlikon(As Victory ship only)

SS Brainerd Victory was a Victory-class cargo ship built during World War II.

Brainerd city Mayor Frank Johnson wrote to the Oregon Shipbuilding Company: The naming of a ship for Brainerd is greatly appreciated by our citizens. Boys of this community who formed a tank company fought, died and were taken prisoner on Bataan and naming of the S.S. Brainerd Victory stands as a tribute to them. The ship was christened by Mrs. J.A. McEachern, wife of the corporation's president John Alexander McEachern. The Brainerd Victory was sponsored by Oregon Shipbuilding Company shipyard employees to let them share in the last Victory ship built under government contract. She was operated by Weyerhaeuser Steamship Company during the war.

In a letter to Mayor Johnson, Robert Horton, the public relations director for the United States Maritime Commission wrote: It is a pleasure to advise you that the Maritime Commission is naming one of the new Victory ships in honor of the city of Brainerd, Minnesota. This vessel is one of a series going into service during 1945, which will be named after cities of the United States.

Victory ships were designed to replace the earlier Liberty ships. Liberty ships were designed to be used just for World War II. Victory ships were designed to last longer and serve the US Navy after the war. The Victory ship differed from a Liberty ship in that they were faster, longer and wider, taller, had a thinner stack that was set farther toward the superstructure and had a long raised forecastle.

As the war was over, the Brainerd Victory steamed the West Coast, delivering goods to San Francisco, Los Angeles and Suisun Bay.

== Private use ==
In 1950 Brainerd Victory was sold to Pope & Talbot, Inc. of San Francisco and renamed SS P&T Voyager. In March 1962 she was sold to Sumner A. Long of New York City and renamed SS Smith Voyager, and was operated by the Anne Quinn Corporation.

The Smith Voyager on Dec. 20, 1964 was loaded with a cargo of $500,000 worth of grain. The load shifted violently about 780 miles South East of Bermuda in the Atlantic Ocean. The shifted load caused a crack in the hull and she took on water. The foundering ship developed a heavy starboard angle of list. The sea was rough with waves 20 to 30 feet high as she steamed to India. Due to fear of sinking, her crew abandoned the Smith Voyager at 1:20 pm; the captain and three crew members stayed on board. The other crew members abandoned ship into her lifeboats and shot out red distress flares. Due to the rough sea, the 26-foot-long lifeboats capsized and four members of the crew drowned. The USCGC Rockaway steamed to help the crew. The 533-foot German freighter M.V. Mathilde Bolton also came to her aid. U.S. Coast Guard aircraft from Bermuda and Elizabeth City, North Carolina, and United States Air Force aircraft from the 55th Air Rescue Squadron flew rescue missions. They dropped survival equipment to the crew. On Dec. 25, 1964, the Smith Voyager was in tow by the British salvage tug Marinla to be saved, but on the trip she sank by the stern on Dec. 27, 1964 at 28.30 N 50.48 W, about 850 miles from Bermuda. The captain and three crew members boarded the tug and were saved.

A US district court found that the Smith Voyager was not seaworthy. The Smith Voyager was overloaded with grain when she departed Freeport, Texas. The court found evidence that the steam evaporators and boilers were not working correctly. Also there was a leak in the rudder stock gland, thus sea water was leaking into the steering room and was draining into the bilge.

== See also ==
- List of Victory ships
- Liberty ship
- Type C1 ship
- Type C2 ship
- Type C3 ship

== Sources ==
- Sawyer, L.A. and W.H. Mitchell. Victory ships and tankers: The history of the ‘Victory’ type cargo ships and of the tankers built in the United States of America during World War II, Cornell Maritime Press, 1974, 0-87033-182-5.
- United States Maritime Commission:
- Victory Cargo Ships
