= SS Solomon Juneau =

World War II Liberty ship of the United States

- A Liberty ship at sea

History

United States
- Name: Solomon Juneau
- Namesake: Solomon Juneau
- Builder: California Shipbuilding Corporation, Terminal Island, Los Angeles
- Yard number: 134
- Way number: 10
- Laid down: 9 January 1943
- Launched: 6 February 1943
- Completed: 23 February 1943
- Fate: Scrapped, 1962

General characteristics
- Class & type: Type EC2-S-C1 Liberty ship
- Displacement: 14,245 long tons (14,474 t)
- Length: 441 ft 6 in (134.57 m) o/a; 417 ft 9 in (127.33 m) p/p; 427 ft (130 m) w/l
- Beam: 57 ft (17 m)
- Draft: 27 ft 9 in (8.46 m)
- Propulsion: Two oil-fired boilers; Triple-expansion steam engine; 2,500 hp (1,900 kW); Single screw
- Speed: 11 knots (20 km/h; 13 mph)
- Range: 20,000 nmi (37,000 km; 23,000 mi)
- Capacity: 10,856 t (10,685 long tons) deadweight (DWT)
- Crew: 81
- Armament: Stern-mounted 4 in (100 mm) deck gun; Variety of anti-aircraft guns

SS Solomon Juneau (MC hull number 709) was a Liberty ship built in the United States during World War II. Named after Solomon Juneau, one of the founders and the first mayor of Milwaukee, the ship was laid down by California Shipbuilding Corporation at Terminal Island in Los Angeles, and launched on 6 February 1943. It was operated by Weyerhaeuser Steamship Company.

While in the Mediterranean, the SS Solomon Juneau shot down five enemy German aircraft. A German submarine torpedoed the ship in April 1945, blowing two soldiers overboard who were never found. The ship was repaired. Seventeen years later, in 1962, it was scrapped at Panama City, Florida.

== See also ==
- List of Liberty ships (S–Z)
- SS Winona: a Weyerhaeuser ship in World War I
