= SS Barney Kirschbaum =

Liberty ship of WWII

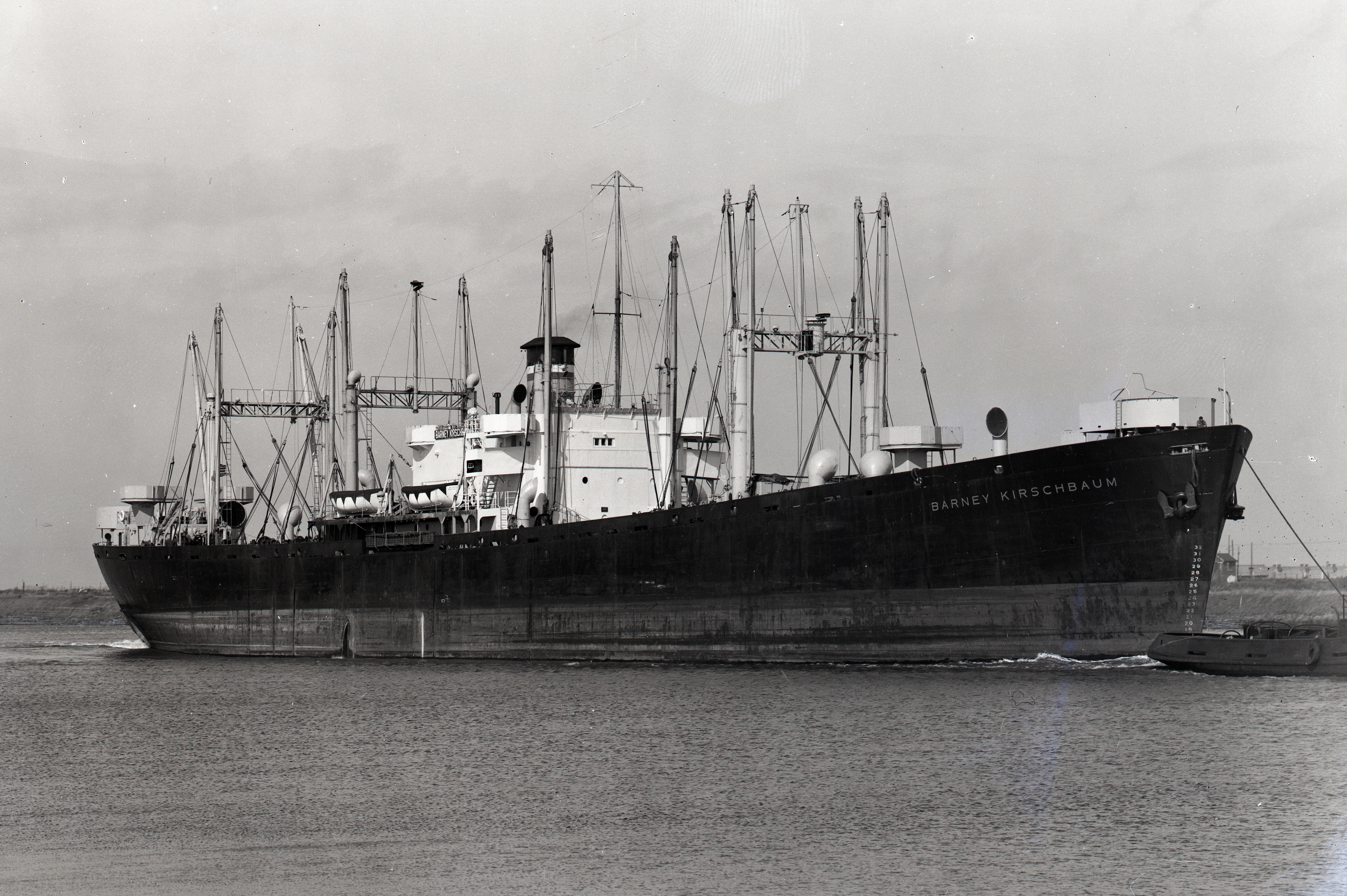
- Barney Kirschbaum in the port of Antwerp

History

United States
- Name: Barney Kirschbaum
- Namesake: Barney Kirschbaum
- Owner: War Shipping Administration (WSA)
- Operator: Weyerhaeuser Steamship Company
- Port of registry: Pensacola, Florida
- Ordered: as type (EC2-S-C5) hull, MC hull 2348
- Builder: J.A. Jones Construction, Panama City, Florida
- Cost: $1,023,236
- Yard number: 89
- Way number: 4
- Laid down: 15 February 1945
- Launched: 30 March 1945
- Completed: 13 April 1945
- Identification: US official number: 247601; IMO number: 5036999; Call sign: ANTD, KIHM
- Fate: Placed in the National Defense Reserve Fleet, Hudson River Reserve Fleet, Jones Point, New York, 14 June 1949; Placed in the National Defense Reserve Fleet, Mobile, Alabama, 17 August 1953; Sold for scrapping, 9 June 1972, removed from fleet, 13 February 1973

General characteristics
- Class & type: Liberty ship; type EC2-S-C5, boxed aircraft transport
- Tonnage: 10,600 LT DWT; 7,200 GRT
- Displacement: 3,380 long tons (3,434 t) (light); 14,245 long tons (14,474 t) (max)
- Length: 441 feet 6 inches (135 m) oa; 416 feet (127 m) pp; 427 feet (130 m) lwl
- Beam: 57 feet (17 m)
- Draft: 27 ft 9.25 in (8.4646 m)
- Installed power: 2 × Oil fired 450 °F (232 °C) boilers, operating at 220 psi (1,500 kPa); 2,500 hp (1,900 kW)
- Propulsion: 1 × triple-expansion steam engine, (manufactured by Joshua Hendy Iron Works, Sunnyvale, California); 1 × screw propeller
- Speed: 11.5 knots (21.3 km/h; 13.2 mph)
- Capacity: 490,000 cubic feet (13,875 m^{3}) (bale)
- Complement: 38–62 USMM; 21–40 USNAG
- Armament: Varied by ship; Bow-mounted 3-inch (76 mm)/50-caliber gun; Stern-mounted 4-inch (102 mm)/50-caliber gun; 2–8 × single 20-millimeter (0.79 in) Oerlikon anti-aircraft (AA) cannons and/or, 2–8 × 37-millimeter (1.46 in) M1 AA guns

SS Barney Kirschbaum was a Liberty ship, built in the United States during World War II. She was named after Barney Kirschbaum, the Master of the US merchant ship Collingsworth. Kirschbaum was killed when the ship was torpedoed by U-124, 9 January 1943.

== Construction ==
Barney Kirschbaum was laid down on 15 February 1945, under a Maritime Commission (MARCOM) contract, MC hull 2348, by J.A. Jones Construction, Panama City, Florida; she was launched on 30 March 1945.

== History ==
She was allocated to Weyerhaeuser Steamship Company, on 21 March 1945. On 14 June 1949, she was laid up in the National Defense Reserve Fleet, Hudson River Reserve Fleet, Jones Point, New York. On 17 August 1953, she was placed in the National Defense Reserve Fleet, Mobile, Alabama. She was sold for scrapping, 9 June 1972, to Pinto Island Metals Co., for $32,500. She was withdrawn from the fleet, 13 February 1973.

== Bibliography ==
- "Jones Construction, Panama City FL". www.ShipbuildingHistory.com. 13 October 2010.
- Maritime Administration. "Barney Kirschbaum". Ship History Database Vessel Status Card. U.S. Department of Transportation, Maritime Administration.
- Davies, James (May 2004). "Specifications (As-Built)" (PDF). p. 23.
- "SS Barney Kirschbaum".
