= SS Coeur d'Alene Victory =

Victory ship of the United States

- Typical Liberty Ship at sea

History

United States
- Name: Coeur d'Alene Victory
- Namesake: City of Coeur d'Alene, Idaho
- Owner: War Shipping Administration
- Operator: Weyerhaeuser Steamship Company, Isbrandtsen Steamship Company
- Builder: Oregon Shipbuilding Company Portland
- Laid down: November 12, 1944
- Launched: December 15, 1944
- Completed: January 12, 1945
- Fate: Sold

History

United States
- Name: SS Examilia 1947 (Greece!)
- Operator: Reported as Victory Carriers Incorporated - Export Steamship Corp.
- Fate: Seized by the US government 1953, for false sale reporting.

History

United States
- Name: SS Coeur d'Alene Victory 1953
- Operator: US Navy
- Fate: Scrapped in 1969 in Taiwan

General characteristics
- Class & type: VC2-S-AP3 Victory ship
- Tonnage: 7612 GRT, 4,553 NRT
- Displacement: 15,200 tons
- Length: 455 ft (139 m)
- Beam: 62 ft (19 m)
- Draught: 28 ft (8.5 m)
- Installed power: 8,500 shp (6,300 kW)
- Propulsion: HP & LP turbines geared to a single 20.5-foot (6.2 m) propeller
- Speed: 16.5 knots
- Boats & landing craft carried: 4 Lifeboats
- Complement: 62 Merchant Marine and 28 US Naval Armed Guards
- Armament: 1 × 5 inch (127 mm)/38 caliber gun; 1 × 3 inch (76 mm)/50 caliber gun; 8 × 20 mm Oerlikon

The SS Coeur d'Alene Victory was a Victory ship built during World War II under the Emergency Shipbuilding program. She was launched by the Oregon Shipbuilding Corporation on December 15, 1944, completed on January 12, 1945. The ship's United States Maritime Commission designation was VC2-S-AP3, hull number 153 (1207). The Maritime Commission turned her over to a civilian contractor, the Isbrandtsen Steamship Company, for operation under the War Shipping Administration.

Victory ships were designed to supersede the earlier Liberty Ships. Unlike Liberty ships, Victory ships were designed to serve the US Navy after the war and also last longer. The Victory ship differed from a Liberty ship in that they were: faster, longer and wider, taller, and had a thinner stack set farther toward the superstructure. They also had a long raised forecastle.

== World War II. ==
The SS Coeur d'Alene Victory was used as cargo ship in World War II. Coeur d'Alene Victory was 153 of the new 10,500-ton class ship known as Victory ships. Victory ships were designed to replace the earlier Liberty Ships. Liberty ships were designed to be used just for WW2. Victory ships were designed to last longer and serve the US Navy after the war. The Victory ship differed from a Liberty ship in that they were: faster, longer and wider, taller, a thinner stack set farther toward the superstructure and had a long raised forecastle. On July 22, 1946, she departed New York City for Budapest.

== Korean War ==
Coeur d'Alene Victory served shortly in the Korean War. Coeur d'Alene Victory loaded up on Quonset huts at Quonset Point, Rhode Island. She ran aground at Quonset Point, but waited for high tide she was able to get free. On December 4, 1950, she arrived at Pusan, Korea. Fight had intensified in Korea since she departed and the Quonset huts where not a top priority no. After a few days she departed Pusan and streamed to Kobay loaded radar sets and streamed to Yokohama, Japan. She then streamed to Mugi District, Gifu, Japan and loaded fire rescue trucks on deck. She sailed to Puson and unloaded her cargo. Due to worn parts she streamed to Oakland, California for repairs.

== Private use ==
She was sold to Victory Carriers Incorporated on July 25, 1949, for $986,424.50, then reported transferred to the Export Steamship Corp. and renamed SS Examilia after the city Examilia in Greece. In September 1953 the Coeur d'Alene Victory was seized by the US government because it was a war built ship that was purchased from the US by foreign party who said they were an American owned company. Asst. U.S. Atty. Gen. Keith filed an action in the case in a Federal Court. Victory Carriers, Inc. claimed to be the buyer and owner, but in court was found to be purchased by a Greek company, A. Sonassis, not Victory Carriers, Inc. or Export Steamship Corp. On April 17, 1957, she departed Yokohama, Japan for the USA.

On Nov. 11, 1967 she and the SS Hissem came to the aid of the SS San Jose that was on fire, near Guam.

Coeur d'Alene Victory was scrapped in 1969 in Taiwan.

== See also ==
- List of Victory ships
- Liberty ship
- Type C1 ship
- Type C2 ship
- Type C3 ship

== Sources ==
- Sawyer, L.A. and W.H. Mitchell. Victory ships and tankers: The history of the ‘Victory’ type cargo ships and of the tankers built in the United States of America during World War II, Cornell Maritime Press, 1974, 0-87033-182-5.
