= SS Canada Victory =

Victory ship of the United States

- Typical Victory ship

History

United States
- Name: Canada Victory
- Owner: War Shipping Administration
- Operator: Alaska SS Company
- Builder: Oregon Shipbuilding Company
- Laid down: January 22, 1944
- Launched: March 20, 1944
- Completed: April 19, 1944
- Fate: Sank in action April 27, 1945, at Okinawa, with loss of 3 crew members

General characteristics
- Type: VC2-S-AP3 Victory ship
- Tonnage: 7,612 GRT; 4,553 NRT
- Displacement: 15,200 tons
- Length: 455 ft (139 m)
- Beam: 62 ft (19 m)
- Draft: 28 ft (8.5 m)
- Installed power: 8,500 shp (6,300 kW)
- Propulsion: HP & LP turbines geared to a single 20.5-foot (6.2 m) propeller
- Speed: 16.5 knots (30.6 km/h; 19.0 mph)
- Boats & landing craft carried: 4 lifeboats
- Complement: 62 Merchant Marine and 28 US Naval Armed Guards
- Armament: 1 × 5-inch (127 mm)/38 caliber gun; 1 × 3-inch (76 mm)/50 caliber gun; 8 × 20 mm Oerlikon

SS Canada Victory was one of 531 Victory ships built during World War II under the Emergency Shipbuilding program. She was launched by the Oregon Shipbuilding Corporation on January 12, 1944, and was completed on February 28, 1944. The ship's United States Maritime Commission designation was VC2-S-AP3, hull number 93 (1009). The Maritime Commission turned her over to a civilian contractor, the Alaska SS Company, for operation.

== World War II ==
Canada Victory was used as a cargo ship in World War II. She was sent to Okinawa to supply ammunition for the Battle of Okinawa on April 27, 1945; while unloading the ammunition at Naval Base Okinawa, she was hit by a kamikaze attack airplane in cargo hold five. A large explosion blew out the side of the ship, and she sank in seven minutes at 26°23′N 127°41′E, 2.5 miles (4.0 km) west of Tokashiki Island. Two armed guards and one merchant mariner were killed, and twelve crew members were wounded in the attack. USS Pakana, a fleet ocean tug, picked up survivors of Canada Victory.

Logan Victory and Hobbs Victory were also hit by kamikaze planes at Okinawa. Logan Victory and Hobbs Victory sank as fires on them grew. Pierre Victory was able to shoot down one plane and move away from the burning ships. Canada Victory was one of three Victory ships, and one of forty-seven ships sunk by kamikaze attack during World War II.

The loss of the three Victory ships, each sunk by kamikaze attacks during the invasion of Okinawa, severely hurt the combat forces. The ships were carrying a total of 24,000 tons (54 million pounds) of ammunition; including most of the 81 mm mortar shells needed for the invasion.

The ammunition ship Saginaw Victory arrived April 12, 1945, at Okinawa to replace the ammunition lost on the ships. More ammunition ships were not needed, as the war came to an end without the invasion of Japan, called Operation Downfall. The other ammunition ship at Okinawa was Berea Victory.

== Honors ==
The crew of Naval Armed Guards on Canada Victory' earned Battle Stars in World War II for war action during the assault and occupation of Okinawa from April 26 to 27, 1945.

== Sources ==
- Sawyer, L.A. and W.H. Mitchell. Victory ships and tankers: The history of the ‘Victory’ type cargo ships and of the tankers built in the United States of America during World War II, Cornell Maritime Press, 1974, 0-87033-182-5.
- United States Maritime Commission:
- Victory Cargo Ships
