= SS Fordham Victory =

Victory ship of the United States

- A typical Victory ship

History

United States
- Name: Fordham Victory
- Namesake: Fordham University
- Owner: War Shipping Administration
- Operator: Weyerhaeuser Steamship Company
- Ordered: as a Type VC2-S-AP2 hull, MCV hull 732
- Builder: Permanente Metals Corporation, Richmond, California Kaiser Richmond No. 2 Yard
- Laid down: 13 January 1945
- Launched: 24 February 1945
- Commissioned: 21 March 1945
- Identification: Official number: 247467
- Fate: Scrapped July 1963

General characteristics
- Class & type: Victory ship
- Displacement: 4,480 long tons (4,550 t) (standard); 15,580 long tons (15,830 t) (full load)
- Length: 455 ft (139 m)
- Beam: 62 ft (19 m)
- Draft: 29 ft 2 in (8.89 m)
- Installed power: 2 × Babcock & Wilcox header-type boilers, 525psi 750°; 6,000 shp (4,500 kW)
- Propulsion: 1 × Westinghouse turbine; double Westinghouse Main Reduction Gears; 1 × shaft
- Speed: 15.5 kn (17.8 mph; 28.7 km/h)
- Capacity: 7,800 t (7,700 long tons) DWT; 453,210 cu ft (12,833 m^{3}) (non-refrigerated)
- Complement: 62 Merchant Marine and 28 US Naval Armed Guards
- Armament: During WW2; 1 × 5 in (127 mm)/38-caliber dual-purpose gun; 1 × 3 in (76 mm)/50-caliber dual-purpose gun; 8 × 20 mm (0.8 in) Oerlikon cannons anti-aircraft (AA) mounts

SS Fordham Victory was built and operated as Victory cargo ship which operated as a cargo carrier in World War II. For the war she was operated by the Weyerhaeuser Steamship Company under charter with the Maritime Commission and War Shipping Administration.

== Construction ==
Fordham Victory was laid down under U.S. Maritime Commission contract by Permanente Metals Corporation, Richmond, California, Kaiser Richmond No. 2 Yard, on 13 January 1945, under the Emergency Shipbuilding program. She was launched on 24 February 1945 and was delivered to the War Shipping Administration (WSA) on 21 March 1945 . She is named after Fordham University in New York City. Early Victoryships were named after Allied nations, then 218 American cities were picked for names. Next Kaiser and the Navy department picked 150 names to honor American colleges.

== World War II ==
The SS Fordham Victory was used near the end of World War II. The ship's United States Maritime Commission designation was VC2-S-AP3, hull number P No. 2 (732), Victory #732. The Maritime Commission turned her over to a civilian contractor for operation. Victory ships were designed to replace the earlier Liberty ships. Liberty ships were designed to be used just for World War II. Victory ships were designed to last longer and serve the US Navy after the war. The Victory ship differed from a Liberty ship in that they were: faster, longer and wider, taller, with a thinner stack set farther toward the superstructure and had a long raised forecastle.

During World War II Fordham Victory operated as a merchantman and was chartered to Weyerhaeuser Steamship Company of San Francisco. With a civilian crew and United States Navy Armed Guard to man the ship guns. SS Fordham Victory served in the Pacific Ocean in World War II as part of the Pacific War.

== Post World War II ==
In 1948 the Fordham Victory was sold by the War Shipping Administration to the United States Lines of New York and renamed the SS American Defender. A common trip for the American Defender was Antwerp to Boston and other transatlantic shipping runs. In 1956 she was sold to the Olympia S.S. Corporation and renamed back to the Fordham Victory. In 1957 she was sold to the Marine Bulk Carriers Inc of New York and renamed the SS Wang Archer. The Wang Archer ran aground off Grand Bahama on 9 May 1959 and sank. She was refloated and her badly damaged bottom was repaired. In 1959 she was sold to the Marine Bulk Carriers Inc of New York and renamed the SS Golden Sail. In 1960 she was laid up in the Columbia River after being taken over by the United States Marshals Service due to a Masters Liens on the ship. The United States Marshals Service sold her in 1960 to Intercontinental Victories Inc of New York and she was renamed SS Vivian. In 1962 she was sold to the Intercontinental Transportation Company of New York. On 28 April 1963 in the Indian Ocean at 10.48°N 95.48°E, off the Andaman Islands in the Andaman Sea, she was damaged beyond repair after her speed governor failed, causing an explosion. The steam turbine blew up, the propeller and its shaft were lost. She was towed to Singapore and later scrapped in Hong Kong in July 1963.

== See also ==
- List of Victory ships
- Type C1 ship
- Type C2 ship
- Type C3 ship

== Sources ==
- Sawyer, L.A. and W.H. Mitchell. Victory ships and tankers: The history of the ‘Victory’ type cargo ships and of the tankers built in the United States of America during World War II, Cornell Maritime Press, 1974, 0-87033-182-5.
- United States Maritime Commission: Victory Ships alphabetical list War II
- Victory Cargo Ships Oregon Shipyards Record Breakers Page 2
