= SS Winona =

History

United States
- Name: SS Winona
- Operator: Weyerhaeuser Steamship Company, Tacoma, Washington
- Builder: Federal Shipbuilding and Drydock Company, Kearny, New Jersey
- Yard number: 6
- Launched: 24 November 1918
- Completed: February 1919
- Renamed: built as The Lambs; renamed Exporter in 1928; renamed Winona in 1937; renamed Akademik Pavlov in 1945 on transfer to the Soviet Union
- Fate: Scrapped 1974 in the Soviet Union

General characteristics
- Type: Design 1037 ship
- Tonnage: 6,197 tons
- Length: 411.5 ft
- Beam: 55 ft
- Draft: 27 ft
- Speed: 10.5 kts
- Crew: 56

The SS Winona was an American steam merchant vessel. She was built at the end of the First World War, surviving to see action during the Second World War. She had an eventful wartime career, sailing as part of a number of convoys and surviving being torpedoed by a U-boat on one occasion.

== Early career ==
The Winona was built in 1918 by the Federal Shipbuilding and Drydock Company, Kearny, New Jersey and launched as The Lambs. She was one of 30 ships built by the Federal Shipbuilding Co., Kearny, New Jersey, according to U.S. Emergency Fleet Corporation design #1037. She was renamed Exporter in 1928, and by 1937 she had been renamed Winona and was sailing with the Weyerhaeuser Steamship Company, Tacoma, Washington. She was homeported in the city of Everett.

== Wartime career ==
On the outbreak of war, Winona continued to make voyages, joining a number of transatlantic convoys. She was to have been part of the ill-fated convoy SC 7, but suffered engine trouble shortly after leaving port and turned back. She therefore avoided the devastation of the convoy by a "wolfpack" attack. Later in the war she was sailing along the east coast of America, usually carrying coal and making voyages between cities like New York City, and ports around the Caribbean. The extension of German U-boat activities into American waters at this stage in the war as part of Operation Drumbeat (also known as the Second Happy Time) meant that Winona continued to sail in convoys.

She was part of convoy TRIN-19 in October 1942, and was sailing from Norfolk, Virginia bound for Rio de Janeiro via Port of Spain, Trinidad. She was carrying a cargo of 8,000 tons of coal and was under the command of her master, John Beale Rynbergen. The convoy was sighted and attacked on 16 October by Georg Lassen's U-160. At 21:20 hours he fired torpedoes at the starboard side of the convoy as it passed 50 miles east-northeast of Trinidad. One torpedo hit HMS Castle Harbour, blowing off her bow and causing her to sink in 20 seconds. 30 seconds later another torpedo hit the nearby Winona on the starboard side in the #2 hold. The impact and subsequent explosion blew the hatch covers off and opened a hole 68 by 28 feet (20.7 by 8.5 m). The #2 hold immediately flooded, whilst leaks began in the #1 and #3 holds. The master secured the important confidential documents, stopped the engines and attempted to evade the other ships in the convoy. She suffered a slight collision when her bow grazed the stern of the Norwegian merchant Austvangen. The crew remained on board, and after damage control measures stopped the flooding, were able to bring the Winona into Port of Spain the following day. There had been no casualties amongst her complement of 56.

The Winona underwent temporary repairs in Port of Spain, departing on 3 February 1943 in convoy TAG-40. She arrived in Mobile on 15 February where she underwent more extensive repairs before returning to service on 14 April. She was in convoy HX 300 (the largest trade convoy of the war) before being transferred to the Soviet Union in 1945 and renamed Akademik Pavlov. She was scrapped in the Soviet Union in 1974.

== See also ==
- SS Solomon Juneau: another Weyerhaeuser ship
