= SS Pierre Victory =

Victory ship of the United States

- Typical Victory ship

History

United States
- Name: Pierre Victory (1944–1952); Columbia Eagle (1967–1971)
- Namesake: Pierre, South Dakota
- Owner: War Shipping Administration
- Operator: United States Lines
- Builder: Oregon Shipbuilding Company
- Laid down: 30 October 1944
- Launched: 6 December 1944; 81 years ago
- Completed: 5 February 1945
- Fate: Scrapped in Taiwan (1971)

General characteristics
- Class & type: VC2-S-AP3 Victory ship
- Tonnage: 7,612 GRT, 4,553 NRT
- Displacement: 15,200 tons
- Length: 455 ft (139 m)
- Beam: 62 ft (19 m)
- Draft: 28 ft (8.5 m)
- Installed power: 8,500 shp (6,300 kW)
- Propulsion: HP & LP turbines geared to a single 20.5-foot (6.2 m) propeller
- Speed: 16.5 knots (30.6 km/h; 19.0 mph)
- Boats & landing craft carried: 4 Lifeboats
- Complement: 62 Merchant Marine; 28 US Navy armed guards
- Armament: 1 × 5-inch (127 mm)/38 caliber gun; 1 × 3-inch (76 mm)/50 caliber gun; 8 × 20 mm Oerlikon

SS Pierre Victory was a Victory ship built during World War II under the Emergency Shipbuilding Program. She survived three separate kamikaze attacks by the Japanese in 1945. She later served as merchant marine ship supplying goods for the Korean War. During the Vietnam War, renamed as SS Columbia Eagle, she suffered a mutiny en route to Thailand and was diverted into the territorial waters of Cambodia. After being returned, she was ultimately scrapped in 1971.

== Background ==
Victory ships were designed to supersede the earlier Liberty ships. Unlike Liberty ships, Victory ships were designed to serve the US Navy after the war and to last longer. Compared to Liberty ships, Victory ships were faster, longer, wider, taller, and had a thinner stack which was set further forward on the superstructure. They also had a long, raised forecastle.

== Construction ==
Pierre Victory was laid down and launched by the Oregon Shipbuilding Corporation, and completed on 5 February 1945. The ship's United States Maritime Commission designation was VC2-S-AP3 and hull number 150. The Maritime Commission turned it over for merchant navy operation to a civilian contractor, the United States Lines under the United States Merchant Marine act for the War Shipping Administration. She was named after Pierre, South Dakota, the capital of the US state of South Dakota. The sponsor and christening of the SS Pierre Victory on 6 December 1944 was Mrs. Emma S. Jassmann of Pierre; she had five sons who served during World War II. The city of Pierre and the Pierre Chamber of Commerce sent Mrs. Jassmann to Oregon. The Mayor of City of Pierre, John B. Griffin, was also at the christening with other Pierre residents. She was built in only 98 days.

== World War II ==
For World War II the Pierre Victory was operated by United States Lines and had United States Navy Armed Guard to man the deck guns. The Pierre Victory was used for the dangerous job of being an ammunition ship. She was loaded up with 6,000 tons of ammunition at the Beaver ammunition dump near Clatskanie, Oregon, on the Columbia River. She departed the states and arrived at Okinawa on 12 April 1945, in a fleet of merchant ships serving in the Pacific War. Due to her cargo she was not allowed to anchor with the main fleet, but at Kerama Retto, a tiny group of islands 15 miles west of Okinawa, Japan.

The Pierre Victory was a supplier of ammunition for operations in the Battle of Okinawa lasting from 1 April until 22 June 1945. On 6 April, the ammunition ships SS Logan Victory and SS Hobbs Victory were set ablaze and sank after kamikaze attack planes hit them. Pierre Victory was credited with shooting down one of the kamikaze planes that hit the water about 60 yards off her starboard side. While the Logan Victory and Hobbs Victory were ablaze, the Pierre Victory raised anchor and moved away from the two burning ships.

Her only other close call came on April 27, when artillery shells landed within 100 yards of her. On that day, the ammunition ship SS Canada Victory, sank after a kamikaze attack. The loss of the three ammunition Victory ships severely hurt the combat forces. These ships were carrying a total of 24,000 tons of ammunition; including most of the 81 mm mortar shells needed for the invasion. Pierre Victory survived, and she was able to unload all her ammunition over 12 days with the help of a Naval Construction Battalion. DUKW amphibious truck, Landing Ship, Tank (LST), Landing craft tank (LCT) and Landing Craft Mechanizeds (LCMs) were used to unload the ammunition.

More ammunition ships were not needed as the war came to an end without the invasion of Japan, called Operation Downfall. Forty-seven ships were sunk by kamikaze attacks during World War II.

Pierre Victory ported at Wake Island on 24 October 1945. A heavy storm hit on 28–29 October. Pierre Victory's mooring buoys were ripped loose and she hit a coral reef. The USS Rinehart, a destroyer escort, helped get the Pierre Victory off the reef and into safe water to ride out the storm.

== Post-World War II ==
In 1946, the Pierre Victory was converted to a livestock ship, also called a cowboy ship. From 1945 to 1947, the United Nations Relief and Rehabilitation Administration and the Brethren Service Committee of the Church of the Brethren sent livestock to war-torn countries. These "seagoing cowboys" made about 360 trips on 73 different ships. The Heifers for Relief project was started by the Church of the Brethren in 1942; in 1953 this became Heifer International. The SS Pierre Victory was one of these ships, known as cowboy ships, as she moved livestock across the Atlantic Ocean. She made six trips and took 780 horses, several thousand baby chicks and hay bales to on each trip to Poland and Greece. She moved horses, heifers, and mules as well as some chicks, rabbits, and goats.

In 1948, with her war and relief work done Pierre Victory was laid up in the National Defense Reserve Fleet at Wilmington, North Carolina, and later transferred to Astoria, Oregon.

=== Korean War ===
SS Pierre Victory served as merchant marine ship supplying goods for the Korean War. About 75 percent of the personnel taken to Korea for the Korean War came by merchant marine ship. SS Pierre Victory transported goods, mail, food and other supplies. About 90 percent of the cargo was moved by merchant marine naval to the war zone. SS Pierre Victory made trips between 1950 and 1952, helping American forces engaged against Communist aggression in South Korea.

In 1952, she was returned to the National Defense Reserve Fleet.

=== Vietnam War ===
In 1967, she was sold to the Columbia Steamship Company, Wilmington, Delaware and renamed SS Columbia Eagle.

In March 1970, in the SS Columbia Eagle incident, she suffered a mutiny and was taken into the territorial waters of Cambodia. The ship was under contract with the Military Sea Transportation Service to carry napalm bombs to be used by the U.S. Air Force during the Vietnam War and was originally bound for Sattahip, Thailand. The two mutineers requested political asylum from the Cambodian government, which was initially granted, but following a Cambodian coup d'état, they became prisoners of the new Cambodian government. Columbia Eagle was returned to U.S. control in April 1970.

The Columbia Eagle was scrapped in 1971 at Kaohsiung, Taiwan.

== See also ==
- List of Victory ships

== Sources ==
- Sawyer, L.A. and W.H. Mitchell. Victory ships and tankers: The history of the ‘Victory type" cargo ships and of the tankers built in the United States of America during World War II, Cornell Maritime Press, 1974, 0-87033-182-5.
- United States Maritime Commission:
- Victory Cargo Ships
