= USS Moose (IX-124) =

History

United States
- Laid down: 1 November 1943
- Launched: 17 December 1943
- Commissioned: 28 January 1944
- Decommissioned: 19 April 1946
- Stricken: 8 May 1946
- Fate: Sold

General characteristics
- Displacement: 14,245 tons
- Length: 441 ft 6 in (134.57 m)
- Beam: 57 ft (17 m)
- Draught: 27 ft 9 in (8.46 m)
- Speed: 11 knots
- Complement: 105 officers and men
- Armament: 1 × 5-inch 38 caliber dual purpose gun; 1 × 3 in (76 mm) gun; 8 × 20 mm cannons

USS Moose (IX-124), an Armadillo-class tanker designated an unclassified miscellaneous vessel, was the second ship of the United States Navy to be named for the moose, a large ruminant animal of the deer family, found in Canada and the northern United States. Originally named Mason L. Weems, she was renamed Moose 27 October 1943. Her keel was laid down on 1 November 1943 by Delta Shipbuilding Company in New Orleans, Louisiana (T. 2.ETI.S.C3). She was launched on 17 December 1943 sponsored by Mrs. Douglas E. Schultheiss, acquired by the Navy on a bareboat charter from the War Shipping Administration on 27 January 1944, and commissioned on 28 January 1944.

After shakedown, Moose departed Balboa, Panama Canal Zone, on 15 March 1944 for the South Pacific. Upon arrival New Caledonia in November, she reported to Commander, Southern Pacific, for duty as a mobile floating oil storage ship. From May to August 1945 Moose served as a fuel supply ship supporting the effort to end the war against Japan, calling at Ulithi, the Palau Islands, Leyte Gulf, Okinawa, and Kerama Retto, discharging her one-millionth barrel of fuel at Buckner Bay, Okinawa, on 21 August.

With the end of the war in the Pacific, Moose reported to the Atlantic Fleet at Norfolk, Virginia, on 4 February 1946. She decommissioned there 19 April 1946, was returned to the War Shipping Administration on 27 April 1946, and stricken from the Naval Vessel Register on 8 May 1946. She entered the National Reserve Defense Fleet as Mason L. Weems. In 1948 she was sold to Tramp Shipping & Oil Transportation Corporation for service as Yankee Pioneer. Resold to Weyerhaeuser Steamship Company in 1951, the ship was renamed Y. L. McCormick.
