= SS Saginaw Victory =

Victory ship built during World War II

- Typical Victory ship

History

United States
- Name: Saginaw Victory
- Namesake: Saginaw, Michigan
- Owner: War Shipping Administration
- Operator: Pacific-Atlantic Steamship Company
- Builder: Oregon Shipbuilding Company
- Laid down: November 7, 1944
- Launched: December 12, 1944
- Completed: February 9, 1945
- Fate: 1976 scrapped in Kaohsiung

General characteristics
- Class & type: VC2-S-AP3 Victory ship
- Tonnage: 7,612 GRT, 4,553 NRT
- Displacement: 15,200 tons
- Length: 455 ft (139 m)
- Beam: 62 ft (19 m)
- Draft: 28 ft (8.5 m)
- Installed power: 8,500 shp (6,300 kW)
- Propulsion: HP & LP turbines geared to a single 20.5-foot (6.2 m) propeller
- Speed: 16.5 knots
- Boats & landing craft carried: 4 Lifeboats
- Complement: 62 Merchant Marine and 28 US Naval Armed Guards
- Armament: 1 × 5-inch (127 mm)/38 caliber gun; 1 × 3-inch (76 mm)/50 caliber gun; 8 × 20 mm Oerlikon

SS Saginaw Victory was a Victory ship built during World War II under the Emergency Shipbuilding program. It was laid down and launched by the Oregon Shipbuilding Corporation, and completed on February 9, 1945. The ship's United States Maritime Commission designation was VC2-S-AP3 and hull number 152. The Maritime Commission turned it over for merchant navy operation to a civilian contractor, the Pacific-Atlantic Steamship Company under the United States Merchant Marine act for the War Shipping Administration. She was named after Saginaw, Michigan. Victory ships were designed to supersede the earlier Liberty ships. Unlike Liberty ships, Victory ships were designed to serve the US Navy after the war and to last longer. Compared to Liberty ships, Victory ships were faster, longer, wider, taller, and had a thinner stack which was set further forward on the superstructure. They also had a long, raised forecastle.

== World War II ==
For World War II Saginaw Victory was operated by Pacific-Atlantic SS Company, and had United States Navy Armed Guard to man the deck guns. Saginaw Victory was used as an ammunition ship. She was loaded up with 6,000 pounds (2,700 kg) of ammunition at the Beaver ammunition dump near Clatskanie, Oregon on the Columbia River. She departed the United States and arrived at Okinawa on April 12, 1945 in a fleet of merchant ships serving in the Pacific War. The ship was a supplier of ammunition for operations in the Battle of Okinawa lasting from the April 1 until June 22. On April 6 the ammunition ships Logan Victory and Hobbs Victory sank after kamikaze attack planes hit them. On April 27, the ammunition ship Canada Victory, sank after a kamikaze attack. The loss of the three ammunition ships severely hurt the combat forces. These ships were carrying a total of 24,000 tons (54 million pounds) of ammunition; including most of the 81 mm mortar shells needed for the invasion. Saginaw Victory was the only ammunition ship to survive; she was able to unload all her ammunition over 12 days with the help of a Naval Construction Battalion. DUKW amphibious truck, Landing Ship, Tank (LST), a landing craft tank (LCT) and Landing Craft Mechanizeds (LCMs) were used to unload the ammunition. Saginaw Victory survived thirty-two air raids over the 12 days. Saginaw Victory was credited with the destruction of one enemy plane on April 12 and another on April 15. Saginaw Victory was anchored near the battleship USS Texas that helped in her protection. More ammunition ships were not needed as the war came to an end without the invasion of Japan, called Operation Downfall. Canada Victory was one of forty-seven ships sunk by kamikaze attack during World War II. After the battle heading home, on 12 May 1945 at night in fog Cuba Victory, about 100 miles from the remote US Navy base at Ulithi, collided with Saginaw Victory. The damage to both ships was substantial. The two ships went to the Truk Island (now called Chuuk Lagoon) to have the damage checked. An escort ship took the two ships back to Ulithi. Saginaw Victory was repaired at Admiralty Islands, near New Guinea and put back into service. Saginaw Victory received honors defending herself and other ship from attack on 10 April 1945 and 26 April at Okinawa.

== War relief and Seacowboys ==
In 1946, after World War II, Saginaw Victory was temporarily converted to a livestock ship, also called a cowboy ship. From 1945 to 1947, the United Nations Relief and Rehabilitation Administration and the Brethren Service Committee of the Church of the Brethren sent livestock to war-torn countries. These "seagoing cowboys" made about 360 trips on 73 different ships. The Heifers for Relief project was started by the Church of the Brethren in 1942; in 1953, this became Heifer International. Saginaw Victory made trips moving horses, heifers, and mules, as well as some chicks, rabbits, and goats. Saginaw Victory made four trips to Poland and one trip to Czechoslovakia with war relief livestock. Four departures were from Newport News, Virginia and one was from Montreal.

In 1948 she was laid up in the National Defense Reserve Fleet, at Mobile, Alabama.

== Private use ==
- After the war relief in 1949, she was sold to the Pope & Talbot, Inc. of San Francisco and renamed P.& T. Builder in 1951.
- In 1962 she was sold to Sumner A. Long of New York and renamed Smith Builder.
- In 1965 she was sold to Russell L. Steamship Corporation of New York and renamed U.S. Builder.
- In 1967 she was sold to A. E. C. Shipping Corporation of New York.
- In 1969 she was sold to Transpacific Container Services of Liberia and renamed Oriental Express. Transpacific Container converted her to a 7,456 gross ton container ship. R Duncan & Co. Ltd. of Port Glasgow construction on the conversion.

Saginaw Victory was scrapped in 1976 at Kaohsiung, Taiwan.

== See also ==
- List of Victory ships
- Liberty ship
- Type C1 ship
- Type C2 ship
- Type C3 ship

== Sources ==
- Sawyer, L.A. and W.H. Mitchell. Victory ships and tankers: The history of the ‘Victory type" cargo ships and of the tankers built in the United States of America during World War II, Cornell Maritime Press, 1974, 0-87033-182-5.
- United States Maritime Commission:
- Victory Cargo Ships
