= SS Hobbs Victory =

Victory ship of the United States

- Typical Victory ship

History

United States
- Name: SS Hobbs Victory
- Namesake: Hobbs, New Mexico
- Owner: War Shipping Administration
- Operator: Sudden & Christenson
- Builder: Permanente Metals Yard No. 1, Richmond, California
- Laid down: November 10, 1944
- Launched: January 9, 1945
- Completed: January 9, 1945
- Fate: Sank in battle April 6, 1945 Kerama Islands, Okinawa

General characteristics
- Type: Victory ship
- Tonnage: 7,725 GRT
- Length: 139 m (456 ft)
- Beam: 18.9 m (62 ft)
- Draft: 7 m (23 ft)
- Propulsion: Westinghouse steam turbines, single shaft, 8500 horsepower (6.3 MW)
- Speed: 17.5 knots (32.4 km/h) maximum sustained, 21 knots (39 km/h) emergency
- Range: 12,500 nmi (23,200 km; 14,400 mi) at 12 knots (22 km/h; 14 mph)
- Complement: 62 merchant marine and 28 United States Navy Armed Guard as Victory ship.; 358 officers and men
- Armament: 1 × 5 inch (127 mm)/38 caliber gun; 1 × 3 inch (76 mm)/50 caliber gun; 8 × 20 mm Oerlikon

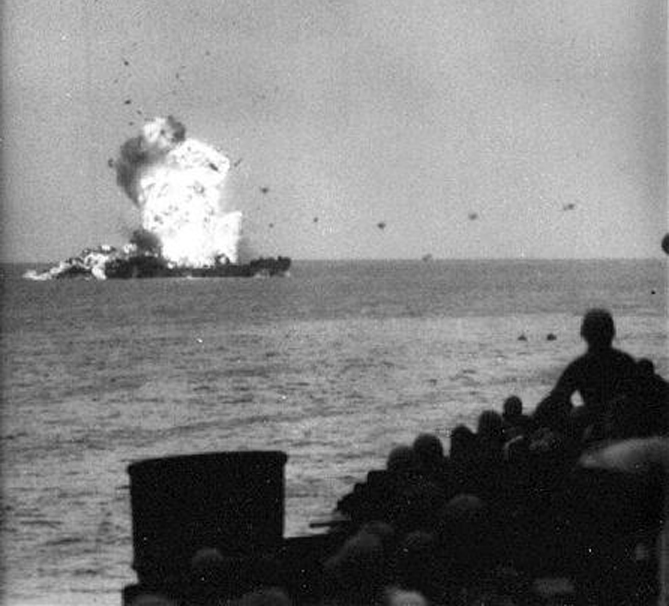
SS Hobbs Victory on fire on April 6, 1945, off Kerama Islands, Okinawa

SS Hobbs Victory was a cargo Victory ship built for World War II under the Emergency Shipbuilding program. Hobbs Victory, was launched on January 9, 1945 by Permanente Metals Corporation, Richmond, California and completed on January 9, 1945. She was built in just 87 days. She was operated by the Sudden & Christenson for the United States Maritime Commission.

== Service history ==
SS Hobbs Victory steamed from San Francisco, California in 1945 to join the Pacific War, stopping at Ulithi Atoll on her way to Okinawa. Hobbs Victory had the job of delivering 6,000 pounds of ammunition for troops in the Pacific during World War II.

=== Okinawa, kamikaze strike ===
Hobbs Victory loaded with 6,000 pounds of ammunition and steamed to Okinawa for the Battle of Okinawa, from 1 to 6 April 1945. On April 6, 1945, she was anchored off Kuba Island, just off Tokashiki Island and Aka Island near Okinawa, part of Naval Base Okinawa. SS Logan Victory, that was near Hobbs Victory, also loaded with 6,000 pounds of ammunition, was hit and sunk by a kamikaze that struck her superstructure. Hobbs Victory steamed away from Logan Victory, at 15 knots. A second kamikaze struck Hobbs Victory at 6:50 pm, port side near #4 lifeboat on the boat deck. It spread flames that exploded the port boiler, stopping the engine. Some lifeboats were lowered into the sea and the order to abandon ship was given. Due to the flames, some jumped overboard into the sea.

==== Ammunition explodes in cargo hold ====
A US Navy fireboat fought the flames, but the next morning there was a large ammunition explosion in her cargo and she sank at 26°05′N 125°14′E. In the plane attack and fire 12 of the crew were killed, 11 of the civilian crew and one armed guard. The US Navy minesweeper USS Success rescued the survivors of Hobbs Victory and later transferred them to the attack transport USS Gosper. In an earlier attack off Kuba Island the Landing Ship, Tank USS LST-447 also sank. SS Pierre Victory was able to shoot down one plane and move away from the burning ships. All these ammunition ships: Hobbs Victory, Logan Victory, Pierre Victory and LST-447 were firing their deck guns and were able to stop some of the kamikaze planes attacking. The Victory ships used their 3"/50 caliber guns, 20 mm Oerlikon cannons, and at longer range, 5 inch guns. The LST also had 20 mm Oerlikon cannons to use against the attackers. These ships with over 18,000 pounds of ammunition were anchored off Kuba Island, so they would not be anchored next to the other fleet ships at Okinawa. They were called in as needed to resupply the fleet and shore troops with ammunition. SS Canada Victory also sank at Okinawa on April 27, 1945.

The loss of the three Victory ships Logan Victory, Hobbs Victory and Canada Victory, each sunk by kamikaze attacks during the invasion of Okinawa, severely hurt the combat forces during the invasion of Okinawa. The Victory ships were carrying a total of 24,000 tons (54 million pounds) of ammunition. This including most of the 81 mm mortar shells needed for the invasion.

The ammunition ship SS Saginaw Victory arrived April 12, 1945 at Okinawa to replace the ammunition lost on Hobbs Victory, Logan Victory and Canada Victory. More ammunition ships were not needed, as the war came to an end without the invasion of Japan, called Operation Downfall. The other ammunition ship at Okinawa was the SS Berea Victory. Hobbs Victory was one of forty-seven ships sunk by kamikaze attack during World War II.

== Honors ==
Crew of naval armed guard on SS Hobbs Victory earned "Battle Stars" in World War II for war action during the assault occupation of Okinawa on 6 April 1945. She used her deck guns to defend herself and other ships.

== See also ==
- List of Victory ships
- Liberty ship
- Type C1 ship
- Type C2 ship
- Type C3 ship

== Sources ==
- Sawyer, L.A. and W.H. Mitchell. Victory ships and tankers: The history of the ‘Victory’ type cargo ships and of the tankers built in the United States of America during World War II, Cornell Maritime Press, 1974, 0-87033-182-5.
- United States Maritime Commission:
- Victory Cargo Ships
