= USS Pakana =

Tugboat of the United States Navy

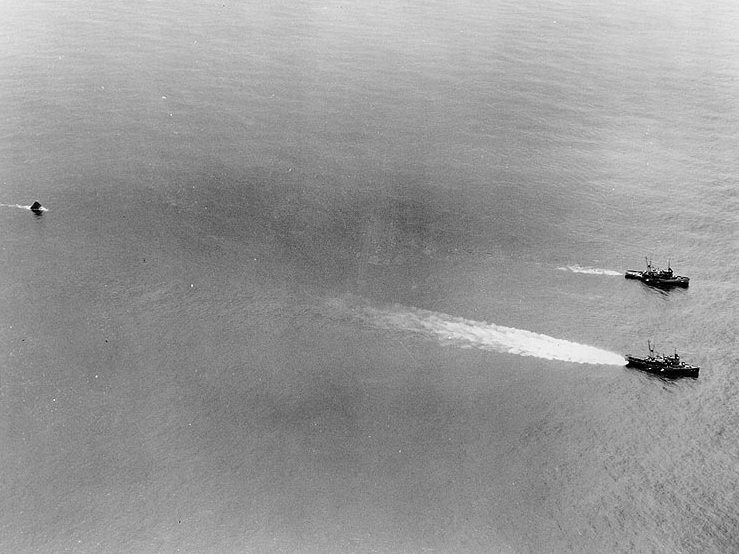
- USS Pakana and USS Munsee (ATF-107) towing the broken off bow of USS Pittsburgh (CA-72)

History

United States
- Name: Pakana
- Laid down: 1 October 1942
- Launched: 3 March 1943
- Commissioned: 17 December 1943
- Decommissioned: 30 April 1948
- Reclassified: 15 May 1944
- Stricken: 1 July 1963
- Honours and awards: American Campaign Medal; Asiatic-Pacific Campaign Medal (1); World War II Victory Medal; Navy Occupation Service Medal (with Asia clasp)
- Fate: Sunk as a target, 27 May 1975

General characteristics
- Type: Abnaki-class fleet ocean tug
- Displacement: 1,675 tons
- Length: 205 ft 0 in (62.48 m)
- Beam: 38 ft 6 in (11.73 m)
- Draught: 15 ft 4 in (4.67 m)
- Propulsion: 4 × General Motors 12-278A diesel main engines; 4 × General Electric generators; 3 × General Motors 3-268A auxiliary services engines; single screw; 3,600 shp (2,700 kW)
- Speed: 16.5 knots (30.6 km/h; 19.0 mph)
- Complement: 85
- Armament: 1 x 3 in (76 mm) gun; 2 x 40 mm guns

USS Pakana (AT–108) was an Abnaki-class fleet ocean tug. It was named after the Pakana, a Native American tribe of Texas. This ship saw service in the Pacific theater of World War II, and was later transferred to the United States Bureau of Mines for use in Alaska before being deliberately sunk in 1975.

== Construction and commissioning ==
Pakana was laid down 1 October 1942 by the United Engineering Company, Alameda, California. It was launched on 3 March 1943, and was sponsored by Miss Louise Mary Shipp. The ship was formally commissioned on 17 December 1943, it was reclassified as (ATF–108) on 15 May 1944.

After shakedown, Pakana conducted numerous towing assignments up and down the West Coast and carried out familiarization training for her crew. On 8 March 1944 she departed San Pedro, California, and sailed for Pearl Harbor with a tow and in company with two YW's. En route, she spent many hours at general quarters due to frequent submarine contacts.

== Pacific Theater service ==
Several weeks were spent at Pearl Harbor providing services for fleet units, towing targets and performing salvage operations. On 28 April, Pakana sailed for Majuro accompanied by USS Saunter and USS Molala with three fuel barges in tow. She arrived at Majuro on 11 May, whereupon she returned to Pearl Harbor. On 9 June, while proceeding to Kwajalein with a tow, her tow wire parted in heavy weather. Pakana subsequently retrieved the tow and completed her voyage. Through June and most of July she carried out salvage operations at Kwajalein and Eniwetok, removing beached craft from the landing areas.

Upon completion of salvage operations, she was given towing assignments to Guam, back to Eniwetok, to Saipan, and to Guam again, where she became engaged in additional salvage work.

From Guam, Pakana sailed 1 October for the Palau Islands encountering a typhoon en route, which tore lose her tow. Again Pakana was forced to ride out heavy weather and watch-dog her charge until she could re-rig her wire. She arrived at Ulithi on 6 October, dropped the tow and headed for Pearl via Guam, to undergo alterations.

== Okinawa campaign ==
On completion of scheduled alterations, Pakana, with USS Deliver, began salvage operations on an LST at Maui, on 25 January 1945, completing the job on 3 February. She was then assigned convoy duty through 25 March, ending up at Okinawa on the 30th.

Okinawa proved to be hazardous as Pakana spent several days extracting LSTs from the beaches while under Japanese aerial attacks. On 6 April she was called to pick up survivors of the destroyer USS Bush which had sunk by Japanese planes, and to assist USS Wesson, which was flooding from battle damage.

Next came salvage assignments at Kerama Retto and Hagushi. On 22 April Pakana picked up survivors of SS Canada Victory. The next day, she had three crewmen wounded during a strafing attack in which one of her lookouts, manning a 40 mm gun, brought down the plane. A short time later the ship's gunners downed another plane.

On 9 May, Pakana assisted the battleship USS New Mexico in fighting fires resulting from bomb hits, then went alongside SS Bucknell Victory to supply power to the stricken vessel, remaining with her until 18 May. Divers from Pakana engaged in underwater operations to remove obstructions at the Hagushi anchorage in Okinawa on 1 June. Later, on 8 June she was directed to rendezvous with USS Munsee, to assist her in towing the bow of the cruiser USS Pittsburgh, which had broken off in a typhoon, to Guam. They arrived on the 20th, and by the 22nd Pakana was en route to Leyte.

Pakana underwent repairs at Leyte, leaving on 20 August. She subsequently provided services and salvage assistance at Saipan, Okinawa, Kagoshima, Sasebo, and Nago Wan.

== Post-war service ==
From 20 to 25 January 1946, Pakana was in Tokyo in conjunction with salvage operations following a recent typhoon. She departed on the 25th for Guam, arriving on the 30th for installation of LORAN equipment. On 20 February she began a series of shuttle runs between Saipan and Guam with various tows.

On 26 April, Pakana sailed for Pearl Harbor with a tow, arriving on the 26th. She returned to San Diego and operated locally until October 1947 when she was assigned to the Pacific Reserve Fleet. She was retained for temporary duty by Service Force, Pacific Fleet until 9 December 1947, when she was ordered to San Diego for inactivation. Pakana was placed out of commission in reserve 30 April 1948 and berthed at San Diego. She was struck from the Naval Vessel Register 1 July 1963, transferred to the Maritime Administration, and laid up at Suisun Bay, California.

On 17 May 1966 she was reinstated and assigned to the United States Bureau of Mines for use in Alaska. On 27 May 1975, she was disposed of via sinking by gunfire.

== Awards ==
Pakana earned one battle star for service in World War II.
