= Weyerhaeuser Steamship Company =

Shipping Company

- Company type: Private
- Industry: Shipping, transportation
- Founded: 1933 in Tacoma, Washington, United States
- Defunct: 1980
- Successor: Westwood Shipping Lines, then J-WesCo
- Area served: Worldwide
- Key people: F. Weyerhaeuser, Phil Weyerhaeuser Jr.
- Parent: Weyerhaeuser
- Subsidiaries: Westwood Shipping Lines

Weyerhaeuser Steamship Company was a cargo Liner company founded in Tacoma, Washington. Weyerhaeuser Steamship Company was founded by Weyerhaeuser Company in 1933. Weyerhaeuser is one of the largest lumber and paper companies in the United States. First called the Weyerhaeuser Timber Company which started with ships for towing logs in the Northwestern United States. Weyerhaeuser started Weyerhaeuser Timber Company with a ship he acquired in 1892. The log towing ship was a 140-foot sternwheeler built for the partnership, Weyerhaeuser and Denkman Company. In 1923 Weyerhaeuser added to ocean lumber cargo ship the SS Pomona and the SS Hanley. The two ships took lumber to the East Coast. In 1933 F. Weyerhaeuser starts the Weyerhaeuser Steamship Company and moves the headquarters to Newark, New Jersey. At the outbreak of World War II the US government orders the four Weyerhaeuser to take supplies to the British army in Egypt. The next year the other four company's ships are requisitioned by the War Shipping Administration. During World War II the Weyerhaeuser Steamship Company was active in charter shipping with the Maritime Commission and War Shipping Administration. During wartime, the Weyerhaeuser Steamship Company operated Victory ships and Liberty ships. The ship was run by its crew and the US Navy supplied United States Navy Armed Guards to man the deck guns and radio. The most common armament mounted on these merchant ships were the MK II 20mm Oerlikon autocannon and the 3"/50, 4"/50, and 5"/38 deck guns. In 1942 the SS Potlatch and the SS Heffron were sunk by German U-boats torpedoes. After the war, Weyerhaeuser Steamship Company purchased four Liberty ships for intercoastal shipping service. In 1950 Weyerhaeuser Steamship Company purchases the Pacific Coast Direct Line and moves its headquarter from Newark to San Francisco. In 1962 the Weyerhaeuser Line is started and Weyerhaeuser Steamship becomes a division of Weyerhaeuser Company.

In 1962 many trees fell due to the Columbus Day Storm of 1962, Weyerhaeuser Steamship Company charter ships to take the surplus of lumber Japan. Ships are chartered to carry finished forest products to Australia (the first Weyerhaeuser transportation of finished products to a foreign market). In 1964 Weyerhaeuser Steamship Company expands with service to Australia, In 1967 charter "M" ships from Hoegh take lumber products to Europe. Weyerhaeuser Line headquarters moves to Tacoma in 1966. By 1969 all the post Liberty ships purchased by Weyerhaeuser Steamship Company were sold and some shipping moved to charter ships.

In 1975 Weyerhaeuser contracted with Leif Höegh & Co to have built six new second generation of Container "M" ships with open-hatch and gantry-crane transport lumber to Europe, ships are delivered in 1977. Weyerhaeuser added two new "J" ships to transport newsprint from the new mill that is joint venture between Weyerhaeuser and Jujo of Tokyo at Longview, British Columbia.

In 1982 Weyerhaeuser Steamship Company's name is changed to Westwood Shipping Lines, the Lines also enters in to a joint venture with Hoegh, with transpacific container shipping. Weyerhaeuser sells its Westwood Shipping Lines to J-WeSco for $53 million. J-WesCo, is a subsidiary of Sumitomo Warehouse in Japan. At the time of the sale Westwood Shipping Lines had a fleet of seven ships, with ports of call in North America, Japan, Korea and China. Westwood Shipping Lines main cargo to Aisa is newsprint, lumber, pulp and agricultural products. Returning to the US the fleet transports automotive parts, motorcycles, parts for Boeing airplanes, outboard engines, tires and heavy cargo like generators.

== Ships ==
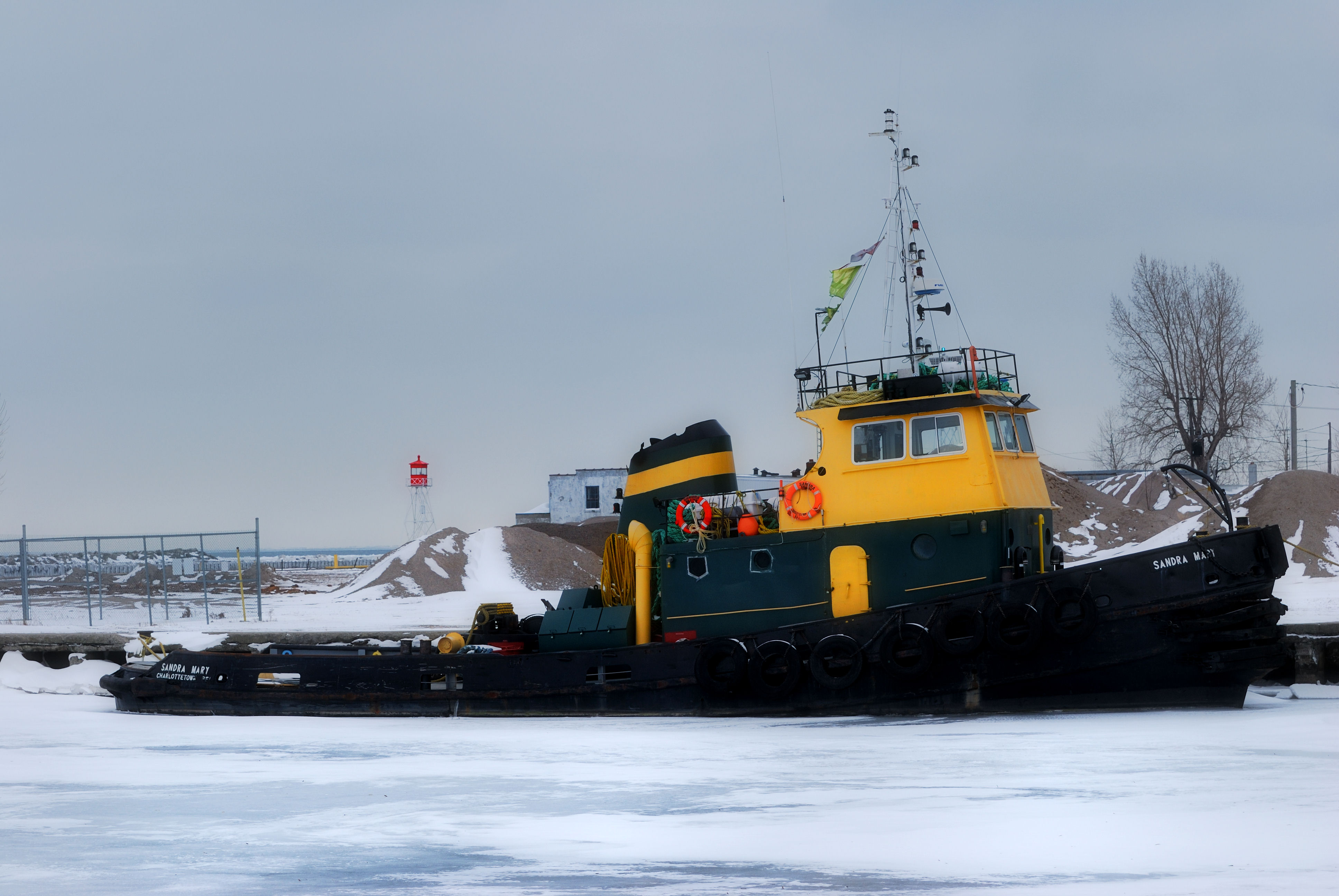
Weyerhaeuser Tug Sandra May at Erieau, Ontario

- Pomona
- Hanley
- Hanley
- Hegira
- Heffron sank by mined on July 5, 1942, off Ireland
- Klamath
- Winona, sank by U-boat October 16, 1942 off Trinidad
- Pennsylvania sank as SS Tanar in 1959
- Potlatch sank in 1942 by Uboat off Virgin Islands
- F. E. Weyerhaeuser (was James Kenny, Liberty ship) (collision with Pacific on September 8, 1955)
- John Weyerhaeuser (was Edward Haines, Liberty ship)
- Horace Irvine (was Louis Bamberger, Liberty ship)
- George S. Long (was Dexter W. Fellows, Liberty ship)
- W. H. Peabody (was Mary Pickersgill, Liberty ship)
- C. R. Moser (was George E. Waldo, Liberty ship)
- Y. L. McCormick
- Nashua Victory (chartered in the 1960s)
- Frontenac Victory (chartered in the 1960s)
- Columbia Victory(chartered in the 1960s)
- Central Victory (chartered in the 1960s)
  - Tugboats built by RivTow Marine from 1979 to 1990 .
- Tug B532
- Tug B533
- Tug B 534
- Tug B535m
- Tug MB317
- Tug B141
- Tug B142
- Tug B143
- Tug MB318
- Tug B210
- Tug B213
- Tug B214
- Tug B 256
- Tug B 257
- Tug B 258
- Tug B 228
- Tug B 212
- Tug B 213
- Tug B 214
- Tug B 225
- Tug B 226
- Tug MB319
- Tug B540
- Tug B552
- Tug B541
- Tug M.B. 310
- Tug Sandra May
- Tug B144
- Tug M.B. 307
- Tug B551
- Tug B145
- Tug B147
- Tug B148
- Tug MB313
- Tug B545
- Tug B546
- Tug B544
- Tug B547
- Tug B548
- Tug Kelsey Don
- Tug Northern Falcon
- Tug MB037
- Tug Burrard Cleaner No. 9
- Tug M.B. 303
  - Tugboats by Benson Bros. Shipbuilding in 1969
- Tug B211
- Tug B215
- Tug B216
- Tug B217
- Tug B219
  - Tugboats by Alberni Engineering in 1989 - 1990
- Tug B138
- Tug B138
- Tug B138
- Tug B138
- Speed boat B550
- sidewinder tug B551
- sidewinder tug B552
- sidewinder tug B553

== Chartered from Leif Hoegh ==
Leif Hoegh charter from 1967 to 1981 44,000-ton, 660-ft-long built by Mitsubishi Heavy Industries, open-hatch general cargo ships:

- Hoegh Mallard
- Hoegh Musketeer
- Hoegh Merchant
- Hoegh Marlin
- Hoegh Mawscot
- Hoegh Merit

== Westwood Shipping Lines ships ==
Weyerhaeuser's Westwood Shipping Lines ships: Westwood are 656-foot “con-bulker” can carry both bulk products and containers. Can displaces 59,531 tons when fully loaded.

- Westwood Columbia
- Westwood Victoria
- Westwood Olympia
- Westwood Rainier
- Westwood Pomona (was Kent Loyalist built in 1985, not a con-bulke)

== World War II ships ==
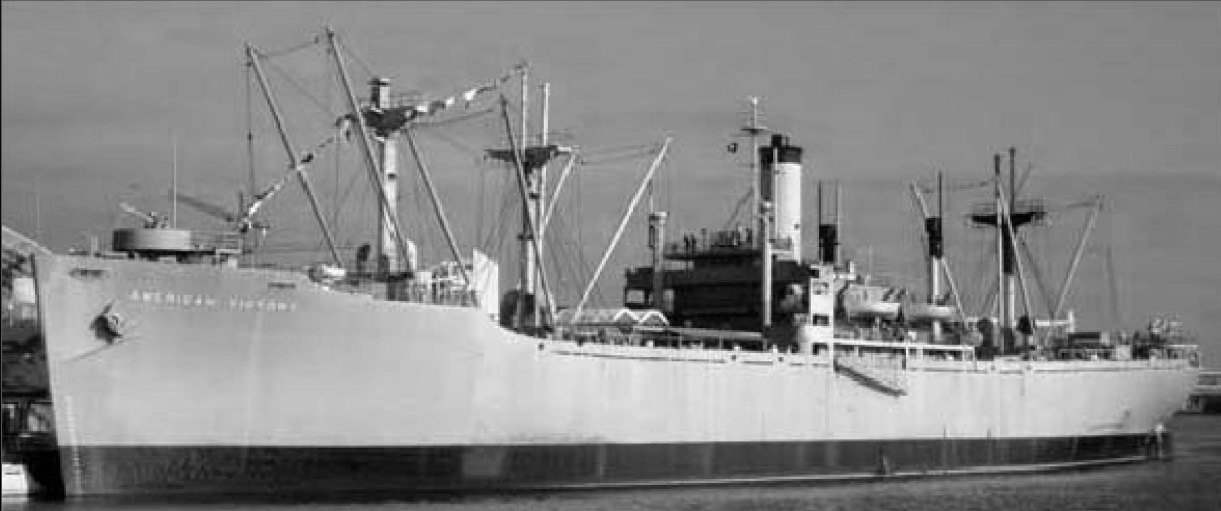
A VC2-S-AP2 type Victory ship

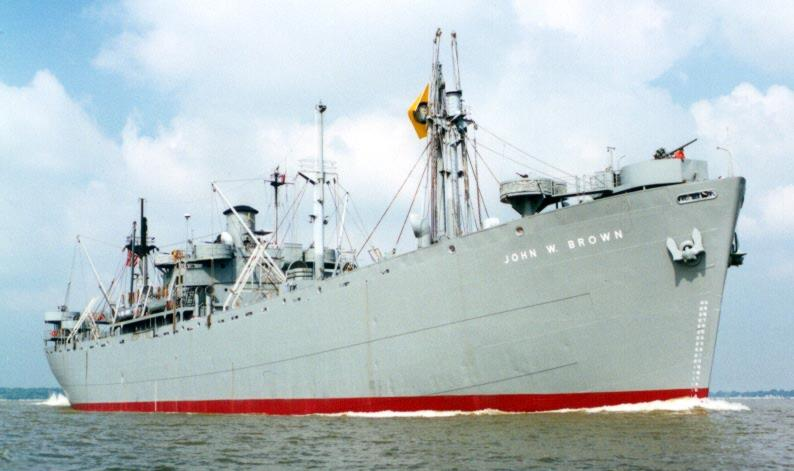
SS John W. Brown, one of four surviving Liberty ships in 2000

Liberty ships operated under charter during and after World War II:

- Barney Kirschbaum
- Mary Pickersgill
- Mary Walker
- Mason L. Weems
- Dexter W. Fellows
- Coeur d'Alene Victory
- SS Fordham Victory
- Edgar Allan Poe, Torpedoed November 8, 1942, did not sink, used as store ship.
- Edward B. Haines
- Leo J. Duster
- Lilian Wald
- Louis Bamberger
- Abigail S. Duniway
- Alexander Graham Bell, Hit mine, repaired
- Walt Whitman, damaged repaired
- William Dawes sank July 21, 1942 Japanese submarine I11
- George Clement Perkins
- George G. Meade, Damaged, repaired
- George L. Baker
- George W. Campbell
- Joseph G. Cannon, Damaged, repaired
- Joseph J. Kinyoun
- James Kerney
- Solomon Juneau, Hit by torpedoed off France April 9, 1945, repaired.
- William S. Ladd, Sank on Dec. 10, 1944 after Japanese Kamikaze attack in Leyte Harbour, Philippines.
- Charles John Seghers
- Samuel Gompers Sank Jan. 29, 1943 after torpedoed from Japanese submarine I10 off New Caledonia
- John H. Couch sank by aerial torpedoed Oct. 11, 1943
- Juan de Fuca Torpedoed and damaged by a Japanese aircraft, repiared

Victory ships operated under charter during and after World War II:

- Tuskegee Victory
- United States Victory
- Silverbow Victory
- Drew Victory
- Berea Victory
- Alamo Victory
- Fordham Victory
- Brainerd Victory
- Coeur d’ Alene Victory
- Queens Victory
