= SS Logan Victory =

Cargo ship

- Typical Victory ship

History

United States
- Name: Logan Victory
- Namesake: Logan, Utah
- Owner: War Shipping Administration
- Operator: American-Hawaiian Steamship Company
- Builder: Permanente Metals Yard No. 1, Richmond, California
- Laid down: November 25, 1944
- Launched: January 16, 1945
- Completed: February 6, 1945
- Fate: Sank in battle April 6, 1945, at Okinawa

General characteristics
- Type: Victory ship
- Tonnage: 7,725 GRT
- Length: 139 m (456 ft)
- Beam: 18.9 m (62 ft)
- Draft: 7 m (23 ft)
- Propulsion: Westinghouse steam turbines, single shaft, 8,500 hp (6,300 kW)
- Speed: 17.5 knots (32.4 km/h) maximum sustained, 21 knots emergency
- Range: 12,500 nmi (23,200 km; 14,400 mi) at 12 knots (22 km/h; 14 mph)
- Complement: 62 Merchant Marine and 28 US Naval Armed Guards as Victory ship.; 358 officers and men
- Armament: 1 × 5 in (127 mm)/38 caliber gun; 1 × 3 in (76 mm)/50 caliber gun; 8 × 20 mm Oerlikon

SS Logan Victory was a cargo Victory ship built for World War II under the Emergency Shipbuilding program. The Logan Victory was launched January 16, 1945, by Permanente Metals Corporation, Richmond, California and completed on February 6, 1945. She was operated by the American-Hawaiian Steamship Company under the United States Maritime Commission.

== World War II ==
SS Logan Victory steamed from San Francisco, California on February 18, 1945, to join the Pacific War efforts. Logan Victory had the job of delivering 6,000 pounds (2,700 kg) of ammunition for troops in the Pacific during World War II to Naval Base Okinawa. The ship steamed to Okinawa for the Battle of Okinawa that lasted from April 1 to 6, 1945. On April 6, 1945, she was anchored off Kuba Island, just off Tokashiki Island and Aka Island near Okinawa. USS Strategy shot down a kamikaze attack plane coming at the fleet. Although the plane was hit with gunfire and caught on fire, it banked and hit the superstructure of Logan Victory at 4:47PM. The ship burst into flames and the fire grew. All of her lifeboats were lowered into the sea and the order was given to abandon ship 10 minutes after the kamikaze hit. Her cargo caught fire and the ammunition caused a large explosion. She sank quickly at 26°10′N 127°16′E. In the explosion twelve of her civilian crew and three of her armed guards were killed, including the ship's captain, Edson Baxter Cates. In the same attack the landing ship tank USS LST-447 sank. Just after this attack SS Hobbs Victory, also loaded with 6,000 pounds of ammunition was hit and sank. SS Pierre Victory was able to shoot down one plane and move away from the burning ships. All these ammunition ships: SS Logan Victory, SS Hobbs Victory, SS Pierre Victory and USS LST-447 used their deck guns and were able to stop some of the kamikaze planes from attacking. The Victory ships used their 50 caliber guns, 20 mm Oerlikon cannons and at longer ranges the larger 5-inch guns. The LST also had 20 mm Oerlikon cannon to use against the attackers. These ships with over 18,000 pounds of ammunition were sent to an anchorage off Kuba Island, so they would not be anchored next to the other fleet ships. They were to be called in as needed to resupply the fleet and shore troops.

Logan Victory, one of three Victory ships lost to kamikazes during the invasion of Okinawa, diminished the supplies of the invasion fleet. The three Victory ships were carrying a total of 24,000 tons (54 million pounds) of ammunition. This including most of the 81 mm mortar shells needed for the invasion.

The ammunition ship SS Saginaw Victory arrived April 12, 1945, at Okinawa to replace the ammunition lost on the Victory ships. More ammunition ships were not needed as the war came to an end without the invasion of Japan, called Operation Downfall. Logan Victory was one of forty-seven ships sunk by kamikaze attack during World War II. The other ammunition ship at Okinawa was the SS Berea Victory

== Honors ==
Crew of the Naval Armed Guard on SS Logan Victory earned "Battle Stars" in World War II for war action during the assault and occupation of Okinawa from April 26 to May 8, 1945. She used her deck guns to defend herself and other ship in action.

== See also ==
- List of Victory ships
- Liberty ship
- Type C1 ship
- Type C2 ship
- Type C3 ship

== Sources ==
- Sawyer, L.A. and W.H. Mitchell. Victory ships and tankers: The history of the 'Victory' type cargo ships and of the tankers built in the United States of America during World War II, Cornell Maritime Press, 1974, 0-87033-182-5.
- United States Maritime Commission:
- Victory Cargo Ships
