= USS Tazewell =

United States Navy transport vessel

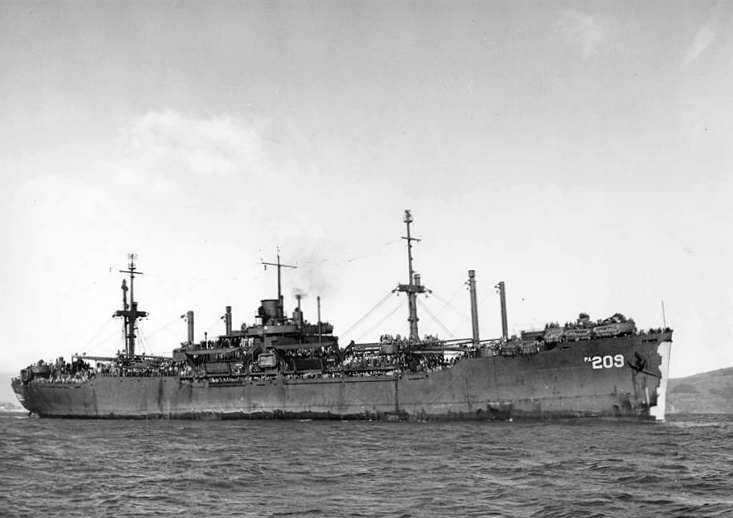
- Tazewell in San Francisco Bay, in 1945–1946

History

United States
- Name: Tazewell
- Namesake: Tazewell County, Illinois and; Tazewell County, Virginia
- Ordered: as a Type VC2-S-AP5 hull, MCE hull 557
- Builder: Permanente Metals Corporation, Richmond, California
- Yard number: 557
- Laid down: 2 June 1944
- Launched: 22 August 1944
- Sponsored by: Mrs Samuel I. Rosenman
- Commissioned: 25 October 1944
- Decommissioned: 27 December 1946
- Reclassified: redesignated Amphibious Transport (LPA-209), 1 January 1969
- Stricken: 1 October 1958
- Identification: Hull symbol: APA-209; Hull symbol: LPA-208; Code letters: NPPE
- Honors and awards: 1 × battle stars for World War II service
- Fate: laid up in the Pacific Reserve Fleet, San Francisco Group, 27 December 1946; towed to the Pacific Reserve Fleet, Astoria Group, 26 July 1958; transfer to the Maritime Administration (MARAD), 17 September 1967, laid up in the National Defense Reserve Fleet, Olympia, Washington; transferred, 13 April 1972, to the National Defense Reserve Fleet, Bremerton, Washington; sold for scrapping, 11 December 1972, withdrawn, 9 January 1973

General characteristics
- Class & type: Haskell-class attack transport
- Type: Type VC2-S-AP5
- Displacement: 6,873 long tons (6,983 t) (light load); 14,837 long tons (15,075 t) (full load)
- Length: 455 ft (139 m)
- Beam: 62 ft (19 m)
- Draft: 24 ft (7.3 m)
- Installed power: 2 × Babcock & Wilcox header-type boilers, 465 psi (3,210 kPa) 750 °F (399 °C); 8,500 shp (6,338 kW)
- Propulsion: 1 × Westinghouse geared turbine; 1 x propeller
- Speed: 17.7 kn (32.8 km/h; 20.4 mph)
- Boats & landing craft carried: 2 × LCMs; 1 × open LCPL; 18 × LCVPs; 2 × LCPRs; 1 × closed LCPL (Captain's Gig)
- Capacity: 2,900 long tons (2,900 t) DWT; 150,000 cu ft (4,200 m^{3}) (non-refrigerated)
- Troops: 87 officers, 1,475 enlisted
- Complement: 56 officers, 480 enlisted
- Armament: 1 × 5 in (127 mm)/38 caliber dual purpose gun; 1 × quad 40 mm (1.6 in) Bofors anti-aircraft (AA) gun mounts; 4 × twin 40mm Bofors (AA) gun mounts; 10 × single 20 mm (0.8 in) Oerlikon cannons AA mounts

Service record
- Part of: TransRon 17
- Operations: Assault and occupation of Okinawa Gunto (26 March–30 April 1945)
- Awards: China Service Medal; American Campaign Medal; Asiatic–Pacific Campaign Medal; World War II Victory Medal; Navy Occupation Service Medal

USS Tazewell (APA/LPA-209) was a Haskell-class attack transport in service with the United States Navy from 1944 to 1946. She was scrapped in 1973.

== History ==
Tazewell was of the VC2-S-AP5 Victory ship design type and was named for Tazewell County, Illinois and Tazewell County, Virginia. She was laid down on 2 June 1944, under a Maritime Commission (MARCOM) contract, MC hull 557, by Permanente Metals Corporation, Yard No. 2, Richmond, California; launched on 22 August 1944; sponsored by Mrs. Samuel I. Rosenman; and commissioned on 25 October 1944.

=== World War II ===
Following her shakedown cruise in the San Pedro-San Diego, California, area, Tazewell arrived at Seattle, Washington, on Christmas Day 1944, and began loading troops and supplies. On 2 January 1945, the transport got underway for Hawaii where she embarked garrison troops for the Palau Islands and steamed onward. She arrived off Peleliu on 31 January. After offloading all cargo and debarking the troops, she joined a Philippine-bound convoy which sortied for Leyte on 6 February, and arrived in San Pedro Bay three days later.

==== Invasion of Okinawa ====
Tazewell was assigned to Transport Squadron 17, which became a unit of Task Group 51.1 for the Okinawa invasion. The transport loaded troops and supplies and participated in amphibious training exercises for the forthcoming operation. On 21 March, the task group sortied for Kerama Retto and arrived off that island on the morning of 26 March. All boats were lowered into the water at 05:30, and the assault troops stormed ashore at 08:00. They met almost no opposition but the ships came under air attack shortly after 06:30 and were forced to remain at general quarters all day.

The task group was steaming in night retirement on 3 April, when it was ordered to proceed to a waiting area approximately 200 mi (320 km) southeast of Okinawa. It arrived there on 4 April, and remained until 13 April. Tazewell and six other APA's left the formation that morning and returned to Hagushi Anchorage, Okinawa, the next day. On the morning of 16 April, the transport got underway for Ie Shima and, at 06:10, launched her boats for the beaches. She departed at 16:00 that afternoon but returned the next day to complete unloading her cargo.

At 22:00 hours on 27 April, a kamikaze plane crashed into a liberty ship some 2,500 yd (1.4 mi; 2.3 km) off the Tazewell's port bow. Tazewell promptly lowered her outboard boats to pick up survivors from the disabled ship which sank in just eight minutes. Since many other boats were also in the water, Tazewell's boats picked up only seven survivors whom they took to the hospital ship USS Hope (AH-7). The other boats rescued many more survivors, minimizing the loss of life.

On 30 April, Tazewell received orders to proceed to the Mariana Islands, and she arrived at Saipan on 5 May. On 22 May, she stood out of Saipan en route to the United States and arrived at San Francisco on 6 June. Two days later, she moved up the coast to Seattle for a three-week yard availability period. She departed Seattle on 27 June, bound for the Marianas, and arrived at Tinian on 14 July. By the next morning, the attack transport had debarked all her troops and had unloaded her cargo. She shifted to Saipan that afternoon.

=== Post-war ===
On 16 July, the ship sailed independently for the West Coast, and she arrived at San Francisco 14 days later. Hostilities with Japan ended while the transport was in dry dock at San Pedro; but, when the ship was ready for sea, she was ordered to the Philippine Islands.

Tazewell arrived at Manila on 18 September, and waited four days for orders to unload. On 22 September, she was routed to Lingayen Gulf where she debarked passengers and unloaded cargo. The ship returned to Manila on 24 September; loaded cargo and 8th Army troops; joined Transport Squadron 19 at Legaspi Harbor on 2 October; and sortied for Japan two days later.

==== Operation Magic Carpet ====
Tazewell remained at Yokohama for 12 days before moving to Sasebo where she embarked approximately 500 marines of the 5th Marine Division to be returned to the United States. She arrived at San Francisco on 9 November, and disembarked her passengers.

Tazewell sailed for the Philippines again on 24 November, to pick up a capacity load of veterans eligible for discharge. She loaded troops at Manila and Subic Bay. The transport began her return voyage on 17 December, and arrived at San Francisco on 5 January 1946. She subsequently made round-trip voyages to Yokosuka to return servicemen to the United States. Upon her arrival at San Francisco on 9 August, from the last of these runs, she was assigned to the Pacific Reserve Fleet there for inactivation.

=== Decommissioning and fate ===
Tazewell was decommissioned at San Francisco on 27 December 1946, and remained in reserve for the next 12 years. Tazewell was transferred to the Maritime Administration (MARAD) on 25 September 1958, and moved to the Astoria Reserve Fleet, Astoria, Oregon. She was struck from the Navy List on 1 October 1958. She was removed from Astoria, 15 September 1967, due to the closing of this Reserve Fleet, on 18 September 1967, she entered the Olympia Reserve Fleet, Olympia, Washington. Tazewell was again moved on 13 April 1972, this time to the Bremerton Reserve Fleet, Bremerton, Washington. On 11 December 1972, she was sold to Zidell Explorations, Inc., of Portland, Oregon, for $51,000, under a Non-transportation use (NTU) contract to be scrapped.

== Awards ==
Tazewell received one battle star for World War II service.

== Notes ==
Citations

== Bibliography ==
Online resources

- "Tazewell". Dictionary of American Naval Fighting Ships. Naval History and Heritage Command. 25 September 2015. This article incorporates text from this source, which is in the public domain.
- "Kaiser Permanente No. 2, Richmond CA". www.ShipbuildingHistory.com. 13 October 2010.
- "USS Tazewell (APA-209)". NavSource. 2 May 2014.
- "TAZEWELL (APA-209/LPA-209)". United States Department of Transportation. Archived from the original on 27 March 2016.
