= SS United States Victory =

Victory ship of the United States

- Typical Victory Ship.

History

United States
- Name: SS United States Victory
- Namesake: United States
- Owner: War Shipping Administration
- Operator: Weyerhaeuser Steamship Company
- Builder: California Shipbuilding Company, Los Angeles
- Laid down: January 9, 1944
- Launched: March 6, 1944
- Completed: April 30, 1944
- Fate: Sold 1947

History

India
- Name: SS Indian Shipper 1947
- Namesake: India
- Owner: India Steamship Co, Calcutta.
- Operator: India Steamship Company
- Fate: 1971 Scrapped in Taiwan.

General characteristics
- Class & type: VC2-S-AP3 Victory ship
- Tonnage: 7612 GRT, 4,553 NRT
- Displacement: 15,200 tons
- Length: 455 ft (139 m)
- Beam: 62 ft (19 m)
- Draught: 28 ft (8.5 m)
- Installed power: 8,500 shp (6,300 kW)
- Propulsion: HP & LP turbines geared to a single 20.5-foot (6.2 m) propeller, by Westinghouse Electric & Mfg. Co., Essington
- Speed: 16.5 knots
- Boats & landing craft carried: 4 Lifeboats
- Complement: 62 Merchant Marine and 28 US Naval Armed Guards
- Armament: 1 × 5 inch (127 mm)/38 caliber gun as Victory ship; 1 × 3 inch (76 mm)/50 caliber gun; 8 × 20 mm Oerlikon

The SS United States Victory was the fourth Victory ship built during World War II under the Emergency Shipbuilding program. She was launched by the California Shipbuilding Company on March 6, 1944 and completed on April 30, 1944. The ship’s United States Maritime Commission designation was VC2- S- AP3, hull number 3 (V-3). SS United States Victory served in the Pacific Ocean during World War II. The 10,500-ton Victory ships were designed to replace the earlier Liberty Ships. Liberty ships were designed to be used just for World War II. Victory ships were designed to last longer and serve the US Navy after the war. The Victory ships were faster, longer, wider, and taller than Liberty ships, and had a thinner stack set farther toward the superstructure and a long raised forecastle.

SS United States Victory was christened and launched at the yards of the California Shipbuilding Corporation. Major General Parker spoke at the christening. The widow of William E. Dyess was at the Ceremony. Lieutenant Colonel Dyess was air war hero who died on December 22, 1943. SS United States Victory was the fourth of a long line of Victory ships to leave the Calship building. The launching of The SS United States Victory splashed into the water of Wilmington, Los Angeles.

== World War II ==
SS United States Victory served in the Atlantic Ocean in World War II. She served as a troop ship taking troops to Europe operated by the Weyerhaeuser Steamship Company. SS United States Victory and 96 other Victory ships were converted to troop ships to bring the US soldiers home as part of Operation Magic Carpet. SS United States Victory did an exchange of prisoners mission. She took German POW's to Le Havre, France and returned American prisoner troops from Bremerhaven, Germany. For the exchange she departed Aug. 17, 1945 and arrived Aug. 24, 1945. She arrived in New York on Sept. 9, 1945 and again on Sept 30. 1945, also on Oct. 22, 1945 from Bremerhaven as part of Operation Magic Carpet. On Dec. 13, 1945 she arrived with troop to Norfolk, Virginia. She was laid for a short time in 1946 at Suisun Bay as part of the National Defense Reserve Fleet, In 1947 she went into dry dock and her engine was repaired in the Todd Pacific Shipyards, Los Angeles Division.

== SS Indian Shipper ==
In 1947 she was sold and renamed SS Shipper, she owned and operated by the India Steamship Company of Calcutta, India. Indian Shipper was scrapped in 1971 in Taiwan.

== See also ==
- List of Victory ships
- Liberty ship
- Type C1 ship
- Type C2 ship
- Type C3 ship
- German prisoners of war in the United States

== Sources ==
- Sawyer, L.A. and W.H. Mitchell. Victory ships and tankers: The history of the ‘Victory’ type cargo ships and of the tankers built in the United States of America during World War II, Cornell Maritime Press, 1974, 0-87033-182-5.
- United States Maritime Commission:
- Victory Cargo Ships
