= USS LST-447 =

American tank landing ship from WW2

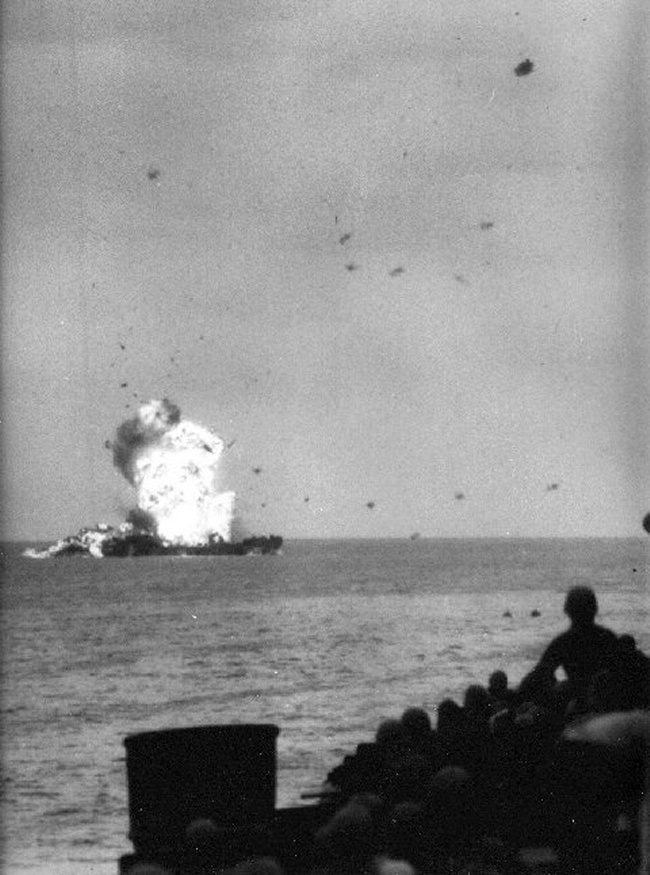
- USS LST-447, being hit by a Japanese kamikaze pilot, 6 or 7 April 1945, off the Okinawa beachhead.

History

United States
- Name: LST-447
- Ordered: as a Type S3-M-K2 hull, MCE hull 967
- Builder: Kaiser Shipbuilding Company, Vancouver, Washington
- Yard number: 151
- Laid down: 10 July 1942
- Launched: 22 September 1942
- Commissioned: 13 December 1942
- Identification: Hull symbol: LST-447; Code letters: NFCJ
- Honors and awards: 5 × battle stars
- Fate: Sunk, 7 April 1945

General characteristics
- Class & type: LST-1-class tank landing ship
- Displacement: 4,080 long tons (4,145 t) full load; 2,160 long tons (2,190 t) landing
- Length: 328 ft (100 m) oa
- Beam: 50 ft (15 m)
- Draft: Full load: 8 ft 2 in (2.49 m) forward; 14 ft 1 in (4.29 m) aft; Landing at 2,160 t: 3 ft 11 in (1.19 m) forward; 9 ft 10 in (3.00 m) aft
- Installed power: 2 × 900 hp (670 kW) Electro-Motive Diesel 12-567A diesel engines; 1,700 shp (1,300 kW)
- Propulsion: 1 × Falk main reduction gears; 2 × Propellers
- Speed: 12 kn (22 km/h; 14 mph)
- Range: 24,000 nmi (44,000 km; 28,000 mi) at 9 kn (17 km/h; 10 mph) while displacing 3,960 long tons (4,024 t)
- Boats & landing craft carried: 2 or 6 x LCVPs
- Capacity: 2,100 tons oceangoing maximum; 350 tons main deckload
- Troops: 16 officers, 147 enlisted men
- Complement: 13 officers, 104 enlisted men
- Armament: Varied, ultimate armament; 2 × twin 40 mm (1.57 in) Bofors guns; 4 × single 40 mm Bofors guns; 12 × 20 mm (0.79 in) Oerlikon cannons

Service record
- Part of: LST Flotilla 5
- Operations: Consolidation of the southern Solomons (June 1943); Occupation and defense of Cape Torokina (11 November, 3–4 and 15 December 1943); Bismarck Archipelago operation (15–19 February 1944); Hollandia operation (21–28 April 1944); Assault and occupation of Guam (21 July–5 August 1944); Assault and occupation of Okinawa Gunto (2–7 April 1945)
- Awards: Combat Action Ribbon; Navy Unit Commendation; American Campaign Medal; Asiatic–Pacific Campaign Medal; World War II Victory Medal

USS LST-447 was a United States Navy LST-1-class tank landing ship used in the Asiatic-Pacific Theater during World War II.

== Construction ==
LST-447 was laid down on 10 July 1942, under Maritime Commission (MARCOM) contract, MC hull 967, by Kaiser Shipyards, Vancouver, Washington; launched on 22 September 1942; and commissioned on 13 December 1942.

== Service history ==
During the war, LST-447 was assigned to the Pacific Theater of Operations. She took part in the consolidation of the southern Solomons in June 1943; the occupation and defense of Cape Torokina November and December 1943; the Green Islands landing February 1944; the Hollandia operation in April 1944; the assault and occupation of Guam July and August 1944; and the assault and occupation of Okinawa Gunto April 1945.

The tank landing ship was sunk off Okinawa on 7 April 1945, following a kamikaze attack. She was struck from the Navy list on 2 June 1945.

== Honors and awards ==
LST-447 earned five battle stars for her World War II service.

== Notes ==
Citations

== Bibliography ==
Online resources

- "LST-447". Dictionary of American Naval Fighting Ships. Naval History and Heritage Command. This article incorporates text from this source, which is in the public domain.
- "Kaiser Vancouver, Vancouver WA". www.ShipbuildingHistory.com. 27 November 2010.
- "USS LST-447". NavSource. 4 October 2014.
