= List of Victory ships (I-J) =

This is a list of Victory ships with names beginning with I or J.

== Description ==
A Victory ship was a cargo ship. The cargo ships were 455 feet 3 inches (138.76 m) overall, 436 feet 6 inches (133.05 m) between perpendiculars They had a beam of 62 feet 0 inches (18.90 m), a depth of 38 feet 0 inches (11.58 m) and a draught of 28 feet 0 inches (8.53 m). They were assessed at 7,612 GRT, 4,555 NRT and 10,750 DWT.

The ships were powered by a triple expansion steam engine, driving a steam turbine via double reduction gear. This gave the ship a speed of 15.5 knots (28.7 km/h) or 16.5 knots (30.6 km/h), depending on the machinery installed.

Liberty ships had five holds. No. 1 hold was 57 feet 6 inches (17.53 m) long, with a capacity of 81,715 cubic feet (2,313.9 m^{3}), No. 2 hold was 45 feet 0 inches (13.72 m) long, with a capacity of 89,370 cubic feet (2,531 m^{3}), No. 3 hold was 78 feet 0 inches (23.77 m) long, with a capacity of 158,000 cubic feet (4,500 m^{3}), No. 4 hold was 81 feet 0 inches (24.69 m) long, with a capacity of 89,370 cubic feet (2,531 m^{3}) and No. 5 hold was 75 feet 0 inches (22.86 m) long, with a capacity of 81,575 cubic feet (2,309.9 m^{3}).

In wartime service, they carried a crew of 62, plus 28 gunners. The ships carried four lifeboats. Two were powered, with a capacity of 27 people and two were unpowered, with a capacity of 29 people.

== India Victory ==
India Victory was a troop transport built by Permanente Metals Corporation, Richmond, California. Her keel was laid on 4 March 1944. She was launched on 15 May and delivered on 29 July. Built for the War Shipping Administration (WSA), she was operated under the management of Lykes Brothers Steamship Company. To the Ministry of Transport, London, United Kingdom in 1946. Operated under the management of Furness, Withy & Co. To the United States Maritime Commission in 1947. Sold later that year to Holland-Amerika Lijn, Rotterdam, Netherlands and renamed Arnedijk. Renamed Arnedyk in 1954. Sold in 1962 to Transeuro A.G., Monrovia, Liberia and renamed San Marino. Sold in 1963 to Atlantic Far East Lines, Monrovia and renamed Hongkong Producer. Sold in 1969 to Universal Marine Corp., Monrovia. Converted to a container ship in October 1970 by Hong Kong & Whampoa Drydock Co., Hong Kong. Renamed Oriental Falcon. She ran aground on the Pratas Reef, in the South China Sea (23°37′N 116°53′E) on 12 July 1972 whilst on a voyage from Kaohsiung, Taiwan to Hong Kong. The vessel was subsequently extensively looted and declared a total loss.

== Iran Victory ==
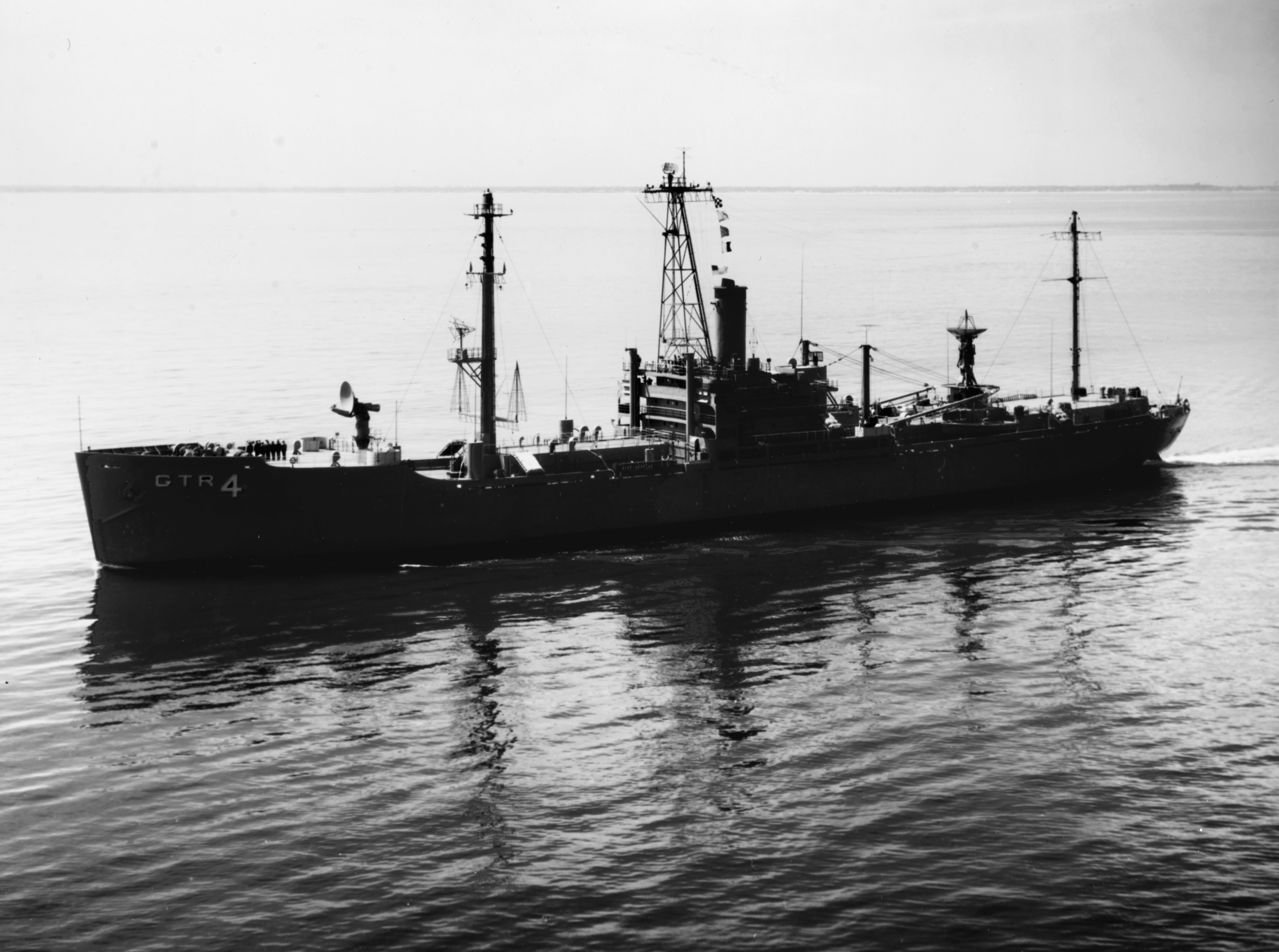
USS Belmont

Iran Victory was built by Oregon Shipbuilding Corporation, Portland, Oregon. Her keel was laid on 25 January 1944. She was launched on 24 March and delivered on 4 May. Built for the WSA, Pacific-Atlantic Steamship Company. Laid up at Astoria, Oregon in 1949. To the United States Navy in 1964 and renamed Belmont. Converted to an Electronic Intelligence ship by Willamette Iron & Steel Corporation, Portland, Oregon. Struck from the Navy on 16 January 1970. She was sold Boston Metals Corporation, Baltimore, Maryland for scrapping in June 1970.

== Iraq Victory ==
Iraq Victory was built by Permanente Metals Corporation. Her keel was laid on 14 March 1944. She was launched on 6 June and delivered on 8 August. Built for the WSA, she was operated under the management of American President Lines, San Francisco, California. Sold to her managers in 1946 and renamed President Tyler. To the United States Maritime Administration in 1958 and laid up in the Hudson River. Renamed Iraq Victory in 1960. She was scrapped at Kearny, New Jersey in September 1968.

== Iredell ==
Oregon Shipbuilding Corporation laid down Iredell for the United States Navy on 11 August 1945. The order was cancelled on 14 August. Completed privately, she was launched as Alcoa Corsair.

== Jackson Victory ==
Jackson Victory was built by Oregon Shipbuilding Corporation. Her keel was laid on 12 June 1945. She was launched on 2 August and delivered on 15 October. Built for the WSA, she was operated under the management of Alaska Packers' Association. Sold in 1948 to American President Lines and renamed President Harding. She collided with the British cargo ship City of Bristol off New York on 11 February 1955. Sold in 1962 to Explorer Ships Inc., Wilmington, Delaware and renamed Smith Explorer. Renamed U.S. Explorer in 1965. Sold in 1967 to AEC Shipping Corp, Wilmington, Delaware. Sold in 1969 to Transpacific Container Service, Monrovia and renamed Oriental Comet. Converted to a container ship in January 1970 by Taikoo Dockyard and Engineering Company, Hong Kong. Now 7,482 GRT. Sold in 1972 to Universal Enterprise Inc. Liberia and renamed Oriental Charger. She was scrapped at Kaohsiung in 1976.

== Jefferson City Victory ==
Jefferson City Victory was built by Oregon Shipbuilding Corporation. Her keel was laid on 19 December 1944. She was launched on 30 January 1945 and delivered on 8 March. Built for the WSA, she was operated under the management of Alaska Packer's Association. Laid up at Beaumont, Texas in 1949. Sold later that year to Victory Carriers Inc., New York. She was scrapped at Kaohsiung in 1973.

== Jerauld ==
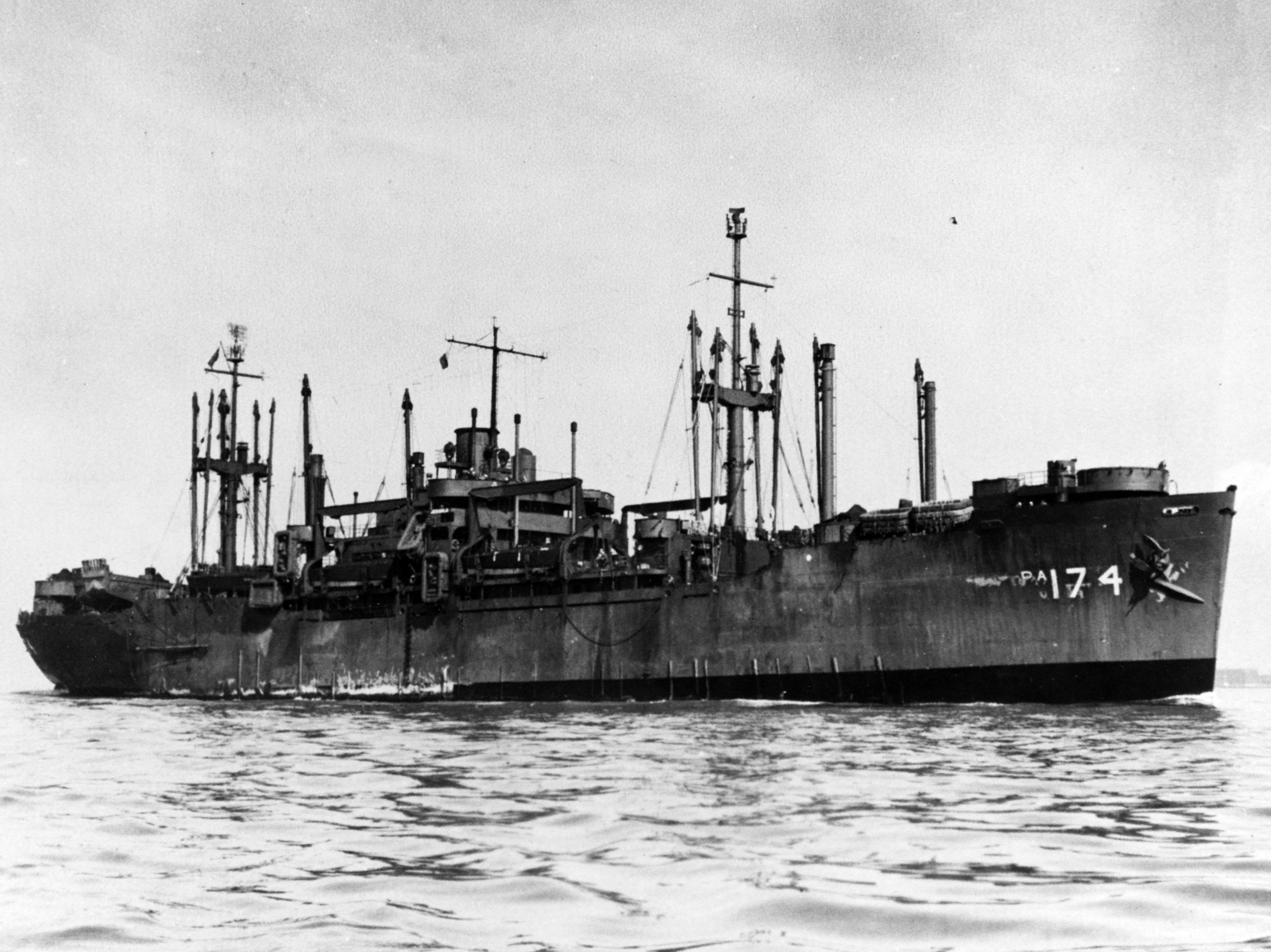
USS Jerauld

Jerauld was built by Oregon Shipbuilding Corporation. Her keel was laid on 8 September 1944. She was launched on 3 November and delivered on 25 November. Built for the United States Navy. To the United States Maritime Commission in 1946, laid up in the James River. She was scrapped at Burriana, Spain in 1974.

== Jericho Victory ==
Jericho Victory was built by California Shipbuilding Corporation, Terminal Island, Los Angeles, California. Her keel was laid on 15 October 1944. She was launched on 6 December and delivered on 13 January 1945. Built for the WSA, she was operated under the management of South Atlantic Steamship Lines. Laid up at Wilmington, North Carolina in 1948. Later transferred to the James River. Sold in 1961 to Terrace Navigation Corp., New York and renamed Thunderbird. Sold in 1970 to Service Shipping S.A., Panama and renamed North River. She was scrapped at Kaohsiung in March 1971.

== Joliet Victory ==
Joliet Victory was built by Oregon Shipbuilding Corporation. Her keel was laid on 5 May 1944. She was launched on 14 June and delivered on 7 July. Built for the WSA, she was operated under the management of Alaska Steamship Company. Laid up in the Hudson River in 1948. To the United States Navy in 1958 and renamed Michelson. Converted for naval use by Philadelphia Navy Yard, Philadelphia, Pennsylvania. To the United States Maritime Administration in 1975. Laid up in Suisun Bay. She was sold to National Metal and Steel Corporation, Terminal Island for scrapping in 1977.

== Joplin Victory ==
Joplin Victory was built by California Shipbuilding Corporation. Her keel was laid on 24 February 1944. She was launched on 25 April and delivered on 15 June. Built for the WSA, she was operated under the management of McCormick Steamship Company. Laid up at Astoria in 1950. Later transferred to the James River. She was scrapped at Alang, India in 1994.
