= Botetourt =

Botetourt may refer to:

- Baron Botetourt, an English noble title, and its holders
- Botetourt County, Virginia, United States
- USS Botetourt, built 1944
