= USS Kenton =

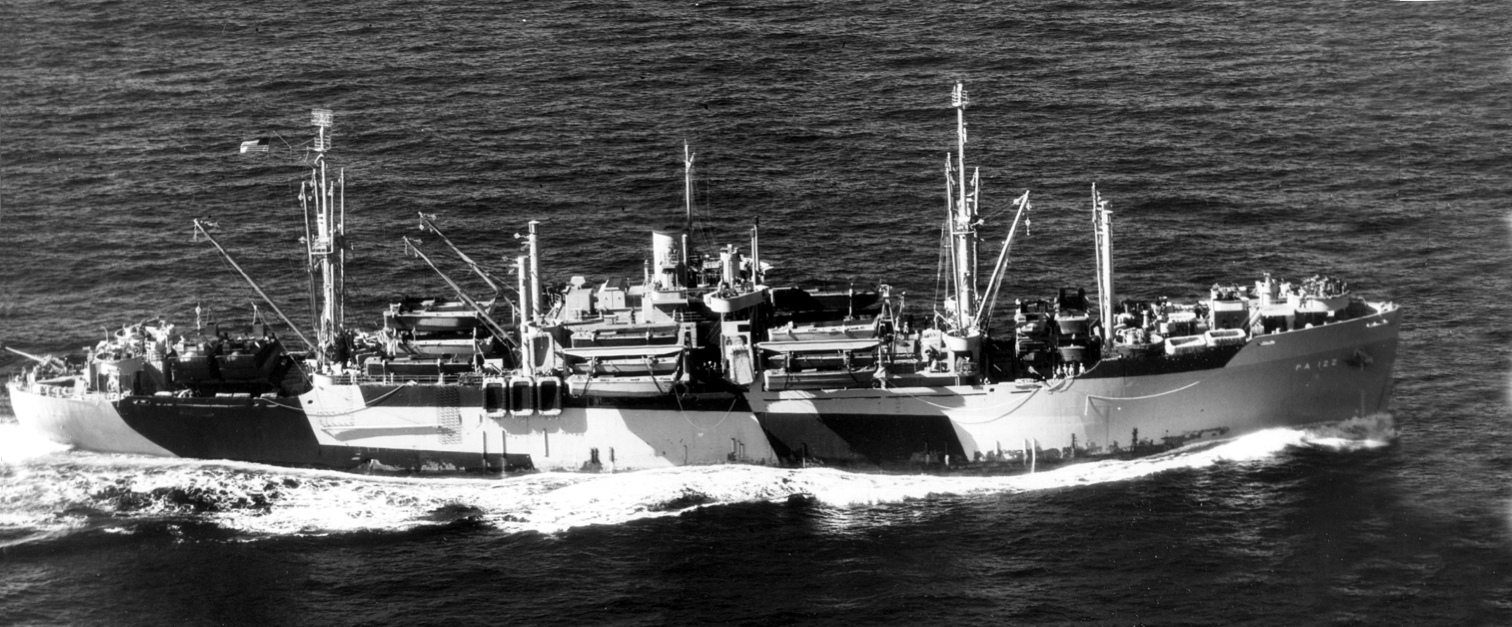
- USS Kenton (APA-122) 15 November 1944 in dazzle camouflage paint scheme.

History

United States
- Name: USS Kenton
- Namesake: Kenton County, Kentucky
- Builder: California Shipbuilding Corporation
- Launched: 21 August 1944
- Commissioned: 1 November 1944
- Decommissioned: 28 March 1946
- Stricken: 12 April 1946
- Honors and awards: 1 Battle star
- Fate: Sold for scrap, 12 April 1973

General characteristics
- Class & type: Haskell-class attack transport
- Displacement: 6,873 tons (lt), 14,837 t (fl)
- Length: 455 ft (139 m)
- Beam: 62 ft (19 m)
- Draft: 24 ft (7 m)
- Propulsion: 1 × geared turbine, 2 × header-type boilers, 1 × propeller, designed 8,500 shp (6,338 kW)
- Speed: 17 knots (31 km/h; 20 mph)
- Boats & landing craft carried: 2 × LCM; 12 × LCVP; 3 × LCPL
- Capacity: Troops: 86 officers, 1,475 enlisted; Cargo: 150,000 cu ft, 2,900 tons
- Complement: 56 officers, 480 enlisted
- Armament: 1 × 5"/38 dual-purpose gun; 4 × twin 40mm guns; 10 × single 20mm guns; late armament, add 1 × 40mm quad mount

USS Kenton (APA-122) was a Haskell-class attack transport in service with the United States Navy from 1944 to 1946. She was sold for scrap in 1973.

== World War II service ==
Kenton was of the VC2-S-AP5 Victory ship design type and was named for Kenton County, Kentucky. She was launched 21 August 1944 by the California Shipbuilding Corporation, Wilmington, Los Angeles, under a United States Maritime Commission contract; sponsored by Mrs. Paul A. Everett; acquired by the Navy 31 October on a loan charter basis; and commissioned 1 November at San Pedro.

Following shakedown along the California coast, Kenton departed Seattle 27 December carrying some 1,500 Army troops to Pearl Harbor, arriving 4 January 1945. After amphibious training maneuvers to prepare for operations in the western Pacific, she cleared Pearl Harbor 18 February with troops and equipment for the Philippines on board and arrived Leyte Gulf via Eniwetok and the Palaus 10 March.

After landing rehearsals, Kenton departed Leyte 27 March to participate in the Okinawa invasion. She reached Kerama Retto 1 April, unloaded Seabee construction equipment, and proceeded 3 April to Hagushi Beach, Okinawa, to discharge troops and cargo. During an air attack 6 April, Kenton's guns claimed two of the seven enemy planes that were shot down. She completed unloading 9 April, embarked 95 battle casualties, and sailed 10 April for Guam, arriving on 14 April. She sailed 16 April on a cargo run to the Philippines, then proceeded to Ulithi, Western Carolines, 29 April to embark casualties for passage to the United States. Returning to Guam 24 May, she embarked additional casualties and proceeded the next day en route to San Francisco, where she arrived 12 June.

Kenton departed San Francisco 6 July with troop replacements for the Philippines. She reached Tacloban, Leyte, 29 July; cleared Leyte Gulf 1 August; and returned to Seattle 19 August. Embarking occupation troops for Japan she sailed 29 August, via the Philippines to Yokohama, arriving 24 September. As a unit of the "Magic-Carpet" fleet, she took on board 1,527 homebound troops; departed 29 September; and arrived San Francisco 10 October.

After two additional "Magic-Carpet" cruises to the western Pacific between 28 October and 26 January 1946, Kenton departed Portland, Oreg., 28 January for the East Coast. Sailing via San Francisco and the Panama Canal, she arrived Newport News 16 February, decommissioned at Portsmouth, Virginia, 28 March and transferred to the Maritime Commission the next day. Her name was struck from the Navy List 12 April. Kenton was placed in the National Defense Reserve Fleet and in 1967 was berthed in James River, Virginia.

== Fate ==
In 1956 Kenton was withdrawn from the Reserve Fleet as part of a Repair Program, GAA-Arrow SS. Co., and then returned. On 9 April 1973 she was sold to Union Minerals and Alloys Corporation, for $91,560, to be scrapped. At 1045 EDT, on 9 October 1973 she was withdrawn from the Reserve Fleet and sent to the breaker's yard.

All that remains of Kenton is her brass builder's plate.

== Awards ==
Kenton received one battle star for World War II service.
