= SS Edward Eggleston =

World War II Liberty ship of the United States

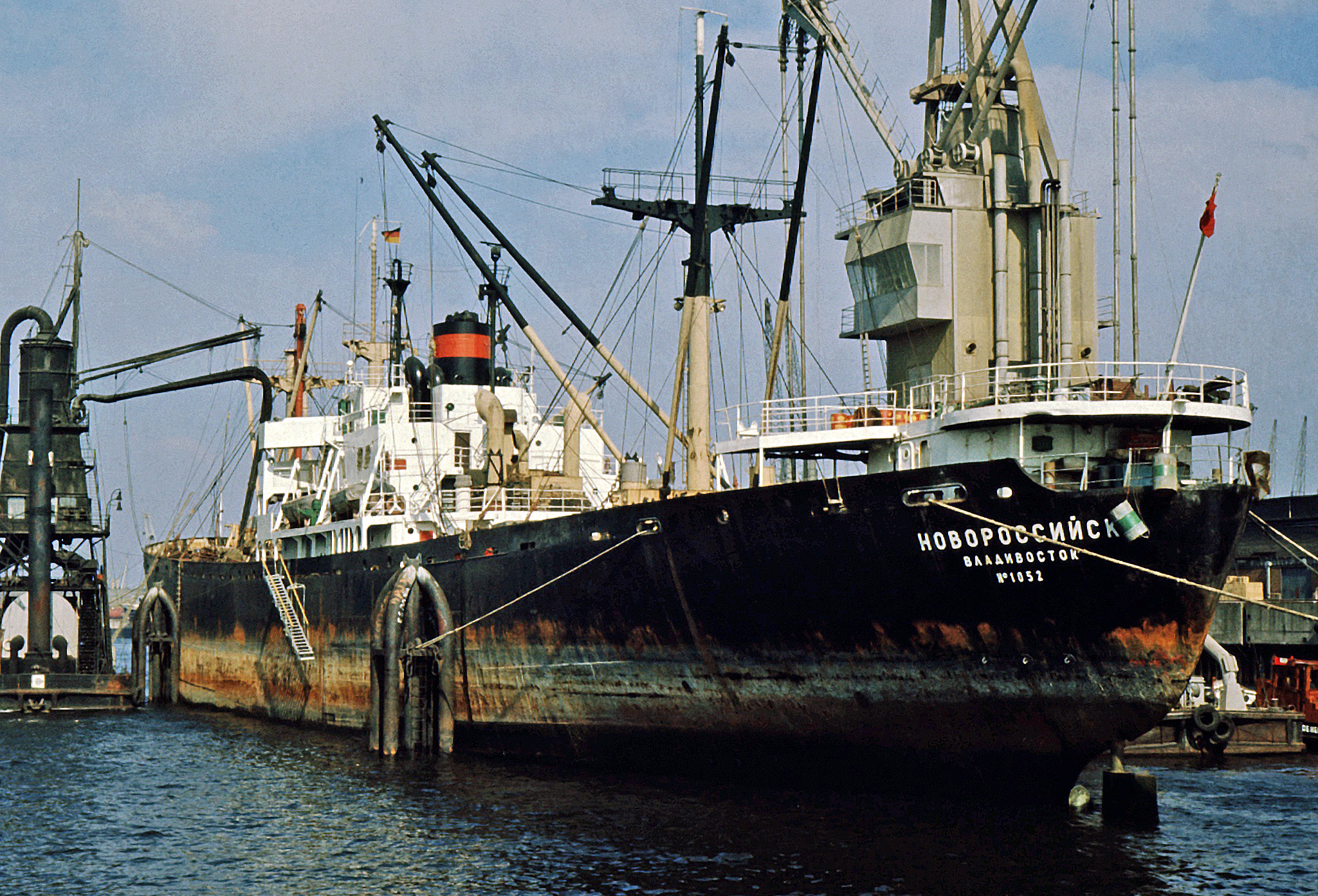
- Novorossiysk in March 1974

History

United States
- Name: Edward Eggleston
- Namesake: Edward Eggleston
- Builder: California Shipbuilding Corp
- Way number: 2010
- Laid down: 20 April 1943
- Launched: 9 May 1943
- Fate: Transferred to Soviet Navy, 1943

History

Soviet Union
- Name: Novorossiysk
- Commissioned: 1943
- Fate: Scrapped, 1974

General characteristics
- Class & type: Liberty ship
- Displacement: 14,245 long tons (14,474 t)
- Length: 441 ft 6 in (134.57 m) o/a; 417 ft 9 in (127.33 m) p/p; 427 ft (130 m) w/l
- Beam: 57 ft (17 m)
- Draft: 27 ft 9 in (8.46 m)
- Propulsion: Two oil-fired boilers; Triple-expansion steam engine; 2,500 hp (1,900 kW); Single screw
- Speed: 11 knots (20 km/h; 13 mph)
- Range: 20,000 nmi (37,000 km; 23,000 mi)
- Capacity: 10,856 t (10,685 long tons) deadweight (DWT)
- Crew: 81
- Armament: Stern-mounted 4 in (100 mm) deck gun for use against surfaced submarines, variety of anti-aircraft guns

SS Edward Eggleston was an American Liberty ship built in 1943 for service in World War II. Its namesake was Edward Eggleston.

== Design ==
The ship was 441 feet (134 m) long and 56 feet (17 m) wide, it carried 9000 tons of cargo and had a top speed of 11 knots (20 km/h). It was mounted with a 4 in deck gun.

== Construction and career ==
The keel of the ship was laid on April 20, 1943. A few months later the California Shipbuilding Corp launched the ship in Los Angeles under the name Edward Eggleston. The ship was transferred to the Soviet Union later that year with the name Novorossiysk. The ship survived World War II unscathed.

The ship was scrapped in 1974.
