= USS Bosque =

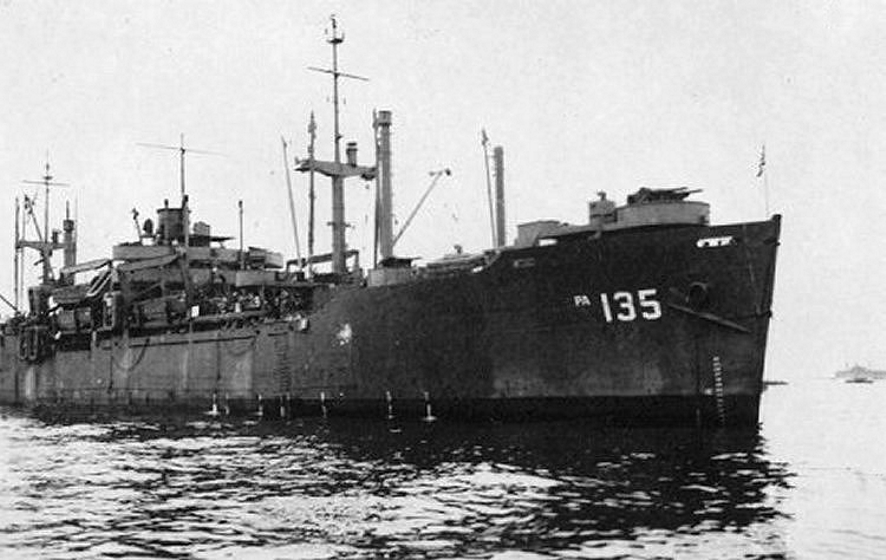

History

United States
- Name: USS Bosque
- Namesake: Bosque County, Texas
- Builder: California Shipbuilding
- Laid down: 7 August 1944
- Launched: 28 October 1944
- Commissioned: 17 December 1944
- Decommissioned: 15 March 1946
- Stricken: 28 March 1946
- Honors and awards: 1 Battle star
- Fate: Sold for scrap, 9 April 1973

General characteristics
- Class & type: Haskell-class attack transport
- Displacement: 6,873 tons (lt), 14,837 t (fl)
- Length: 455 ft (139 m)
- Beam: 62 ft (19 m)
- Draft: 24 ft (7 m)
- Propulsion: 1 × geared turbine, 2 × header-type boilers, 1 × propeller, designed 8,500 shp (6,338 kW)
- Speed: 17 knots (31 km/h; 20 mph)
- Boats & landing craft carried: 2 × LCM; 12 × LCVP; 3 × LCPL
- Capacity: Troops: 86 officers, 1,475 enlisted; Cargo: 150,000 cu ft, 2,900 tons
- Complement: 56 officers, 480 enlisted
- Armament: 1 × 5"/38 dual-purpose gun; 4 × twin 40mm guns; 10 × single 20mm guns; late armament, add 1 × 40mm quad mount

USS Bosque (APA-135) was a Haskell-class attack transport in service with the United States Navy from 1944 to 1946. She was scrapped in 1973.

== History ==
Bosque was a Victory ship design, VC2-S-AP5 and was named after Bosque County, Texas, United States. She was laid down on 7 August 1944 at Wilmington, Los Angeles, by the California Shipbuilding Corporation under a United States Maritime Commission contract (MCV hull 51); launched on 28 October 1944; sponsored by Mrs. Donald F. Stace; delivered to the Navy on 17 December 1944; and commissioned on 17 December 1944.

For two months, Bosque visited various ports on the west coast before departing Portland, Oregon, on 18 February 1945 bound for the Hawaiian Islands. She reached the island of Oahu on the 25th and operated among the islands for about two weeks. On 11 March, the attack transport continued her voyage west. Bosque arrived at Eniwetok in the Marshall Islands on 20 March but departed the atoll the next day. From there, she moved to Saipan in the Marianas where she remained from 24 to 30 March.

She departed Saipan on the 30th and arrived at Guam on the 31st. The next day, Bosque returned to Saipan where she embarked troops bound for the Okinawa campaign. She left Saipan on 15 April, stopped at Ulithi in the Western Carolines from the 17th to the 22d, and arrived off Okinawa on 26 April. During her four-day stay in the Ryukyus, Bosque witnessed a number of Japanese air attacks. On several occasions, her antiaircraft battery opened fire, and she claimed to have splashed a "Frances" medium bomber on the night of the 28th. On 30 April, the attack transport headed back toward the United States. She stopped off at Saipan from 5 to 7 May and then continued on to San Francisco, where she arrived on 22 May.

At San Francisco, Bosque embarked troops bound for the Philippines before standing out of San Francisco on 31 May. She made brief stops at Eniwetok and Ulithi and arrived in San Pedro Bay, Leyte, on 23 June. Five days later, the attack transport embarked upon a circuitous voyage to the southwestern Pacific. During that voyage, the ship stopped at Hollandia on Dutch New Guinea, Nouméa on New Caledonia, and back at Hollandia before returning to the Philippines at Cebu on 27 July. For the next month, Bosque steamed between various islands in the Philippines transporting cargo and passengers and participating in amphibious exercises preparatory to the expected invasion of the Japanese home islands.

The Japanese, however, agreed to capitulate on 15 August, and Bosque departed Subic Bay on 27 August carrying occupation troops to Japan. She arrived in Tokyo Bay on 2 September, the day the formal surrender document was signed on board USS Missouri (BB-63). The attack transport remained in Japan only two days, getting underway on 4 September to return to the Philippines. She arrived at San Pedro Bay, Leyte, on 11 September and, for the next two weeks, visited several Philippine ports. On 22 September, the ship embarked upon another voyage to the Ryukyus. She arrived at Buckner Bay, Okinawa, on the 25th and operated from that port until early October. On the 3d, Bosque departed Okinawa with Japan-bound occupation troops embarked. The attack transport arrived at Iyo-nada, Japan, on 5 October and, on 6 October, moved to Aki Nada where she disembarked the troops. She departed Japan on 11 October and headed south—first to the Russell Islands and thence to Nouméa, New Caledonia. From Nouméa, she shaped a course back to the United States on 26 October.

Bosque arrived on the west coast late in 1945 and, early in 1946, headed for the east coast. She entered port at Norfolk, Virginia, on 4 February 1946. She was decommissioned on 15 March 1946 and was turned over to the Maritime Commission's War Shipping Administration for disposal on 22 March 1946. Her name was struck from the Navy list on 28 March 1946. She was berthed in the James River, Virginia as part of the Maritime Commission's National Defense Reserve Fleet.

=== Fate ===
She remained in James River for the next 27 years, except when she was briefly withdrawn in 1955 as part of a Repair Program, GAA-T.J.Stevenson. On 9 April 1973, she was sold to the Union Minerals and Alloys Corporation, of New York City, for scrapping. On 14 May 1973 she was withdrawn from the Reserve Fleet and sent to the breaker's yard. All that remains of Bosque is her brass builder's plate.

== Awards ==
Bosque earned one battle star for World War II service.
