= SS Carlos Carrillo =

Liberty ship of World War II

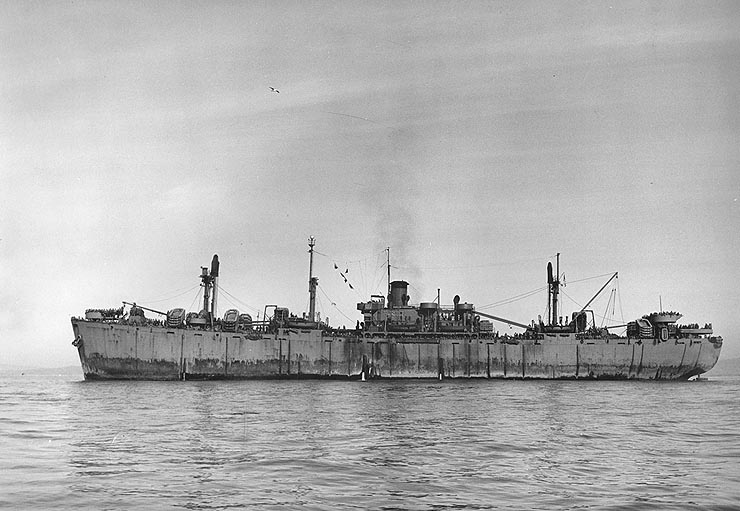
- Carlos Carrillo between 1945-46

History

United States
- Name: Carlos Carrillo
- Namesake: Carlos Antonio Carrillo
- Builder: California Shipbuilding Corporation
- Way number: 1
- Laid down: 19 December 1942
- Launched: 15 January 1943
- Sponsored by: Mrs. Carrillo
- Commissioned: 15 January 1943
- Identification: Callsign: KHZF
- Fate: Scrapped, 1963

General characteristics
- Class & type: Liberty ship; type EC2-S-C1, standard
- Tonnage: 10,865 LT DWT; 7,176 GRT
- Displacement: 3,380 long tons (3,434 t) (light); 14,245 long tons (14,474 t) (max)
- Length: 441 feet 6 inches (135 m) oa; 416 feet (127 m) pp; 427 feet (130 m) lwl
- Beam: 57 feet (17 m)
- Draft: 27 ft 9.25 in (8.4646 m)
- Installed power: 2 × Oil fired 450 °F (232 °C) boilers, operating at 220 psi (1,500 kPa); 2,500 hp (1,900 kW)
- Propulsion: 1 × triple-expansion steam engine, (manufactured by General Machinery Corp., Hamilton, Ohio); 1 × screw propeller
- Speed: 11.5 knots (21.3 km/h; 13.2 mph)
- Capacity: 562,608 cubic feet (15,931 m^{3}) (grain); 499,573 cubic feet (14,146 m^{3}) (bale)
- Complement: 38–62 USMM; 21–40 USNAG
- Armament: Varied by ship; Bow-mounted 3-inch (76 mm)/50-caliber gun; Stern-mounted 4-inch (102 mm)/50-caliber gun; 2–8 × single 20-millimeter (0.79 in) Oerlikon anti-aircraft (AA) cannons and/or, 2–8 × 37-millimeter (1.46 in) M1 AA guns

SS Carlos Carrillo was an American Liberty ship built in 1943 for service in World War II. Her namesake was Carlos Antonio Carrillo, an American Governor from 1837 to 1838.

== Description ==
The ship was 442 ft 8 in (134.92 m) long overall (417 ft 9 in (127.33 m) between perpendiculars, 427 ft 0 in (130.15 m) waterline), with a beam of 57 ft 0 in (17.37 m). She had a depth of 34 ft 8 in (10.57 m) and a draught of 27 ft 9 in (8.46 m). She was assessed at 7,210 GRT, 4,880 NRT, 10,856 DWT.

She was powered by a triple expansion steam engine, which had cylinders of 24.5 inches (62 cm), 37 inches (94 cm) and 70 inches (180 cm) diameter by 70 inches (180 cm) stroke. The engine was built by the Worthington Pump & Machinery Corporation, Harrison, New Jersey. It drove a single screw propeller, which could propel the ship at 11 knots (20 km/h).

== Construction and career ==
This particular ship was the 123rd liberty ship built by California Shipbuilding Corporation in Los Angeles. She was laid down on 19 December 1942 and launched on 15 January 1943, later delivered on 31 January 1943. The United States War Shipping Administration gave the operations of the ship to American President Lines.

She departed Colombo together with Convoy JC 10 on 12 April 1943 for Calcutta while carrying army stores, she arrived six days later. The ship made two trips from Durban to Cape Town from 29 May until 2 June (Convoy DC 28) and from 6 June until 8 June (Convoy DC 29). From 17 November until 17 December, she was assigned to Convoy GUS 22 from Port Said to Hampton Roads.

Carlos Carrillo together with Convoy GZ 60 departed from Guantanamo, on 23 February 1944, for Cristóbal. Throughout 1944, she made independent trips to Milne Bay, Langemak Bay, Aitape, Morobe, Oro Bay, Biak, Lae, Auckland, Nouméa, Manus and Balboa. It was noted that Rear Admiral C.H.G. Benson decided to stay aboard Carlos Carrillo during Convoy UGS 45 from 12 June until 7 July.

The ship together with Convoy GB 734 arrived at Hollandia on 20 January 1945, from Morotai. It can also be noted that she towed the US Army Signal Corps' communications ship USS Geoanna. Carlos Carrillo took part in Convoy BG 513 from Biak to Morotai, from 6 to 9 February. On 21 March, together with Convoy BG 522, departed from Biak for Morotai, they arrived two days later. More than 50 ships took part in Convoy UGS 83, which sailed from Hampton Roads to Gibraltar, from 21 March to 14 April. Carlo Carrillo's last convoy was Convoy GB 745, in which they sailed from Morotai to Hollandia, from 1 to 4 April, during Convoy UGS 83.

She was scrapped in 1963.
