= SS Clara Barton =

World War II Liberty ship of the United States

History

United States
- Name: Clara Barton
- Namesake: Clara Barton
- Builder: California Shipbuilding, Los Angeles CA
- Laid down: 19 July 1942
- Launched: 25 August 1942
- Acquired: 12 September 1942 (delivered to War Shipping Administration)
- Fate: Scrapped, 1970

General characteristics
- Type: Liberty ship
- Tonnage: 7,176 GRT, 10,807 DWT
- Length: 441 ft 6 in (134.57 m)
- Beam: 56 ft 11 in (17.35 m)
- Draft: 27 ft 10 in (8.48 m)
- Propulsion: 2 oil-fired boilers; Triple expansion steam engine; single screw; 2,500 hp (1,864 kW)
- Speed: 11.5 knots (21.3 km/h; 13.2 mph)
- Capacity: 9,140 tons cargo
- Complement: 41
- Armament: 1 × 4 in (100 mm) stern-mounted deck gun; Variety of anti-aircraft guns

SS Clara Barton (Hull Number 636) was a standard Liberty ship, Type EC2-S-C1, built by the California Shipbuilding Corporation, Terminal Island, for the United States Maritime Commission and delivered to the War Shipping Administration (WSA) for operation as allocated by WSA during World War II. She was named after Clara Barton, the founder of the American Red Cross. The ship survived the war only to suffer the same fate as nearly all other Liberty ships that survived did; she was scrapped in 1970.

== Construction ==
The 7,176 GRT, 10,807 DWT ship was laid down at the California Shipbuilding Corporation on 19 July 1942, launched on 25 August 1942 then completed and delivered to the War Shipping Administration on 12 September 1942.

== Service history ==
Clara Barton was assigned official number 24323 and allocated by WSA upon delivery to Coastwise Line (PFE) Line for operation under a WSA agreement which continued for the duration of the war. On 20 December 1946 the ship, under Maritime Commission control, was bareboat chartered to Moore McCormack Lines for operation. In December, 1947 the ship was taken out of service and placed in the James River Reserve Fleet. There the ship was used in a program to store reserve grain, the "Grain Program 1953," with occasional withdrawals to load grain and return as a grain store until returned empty on 10 March 1959. On 24 July 1970 the ship was sold for $124,559 to I.C.E. Chemicals for scrapping.

=== Personal account ===
Clara Barton participated in the Normandy Invasion on D-Day and made many trips from the UK to various ports on the continent as the invasion progressed. On D-Day the ship was hit by a tank shell which passed clear through the ship with minimal damage before detonating. On one of her trips as the invasion progressed the Clara Barton blew a major packing in her main engine and limped back to port through E-boat (German PT-boat equivalents) infested waters powered by the jacking engine, a small engine intended only to get the main engine off dead center. On a subsequent trip the same packing blew again and then the jacking engine failed, leaving her dead in the water again in E-boat infested waters. After an anxious wait she was safely towed back to port. (Note: The previous three paragraphs are oral history from John Robert "Bob" Lowther who was a fireman and watertender on the Clara Barton)
