= SS Colby Victory =

United States Merchant Marine ship

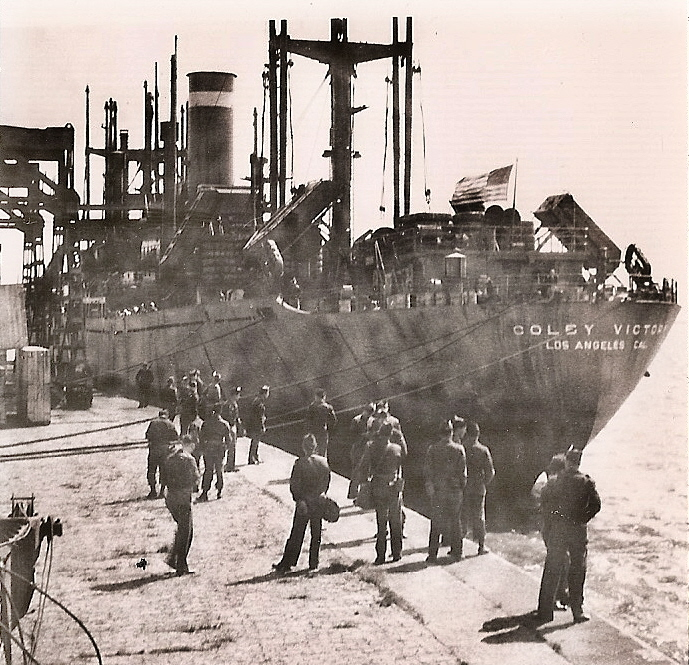
- SS Colby Victory troopship 1946

History

United States
- Name: SS Colby Victory
- Namesake: Colby College
- Owner: War Shipping Administration
- Operator: American President Lines and American Export-Isbrandtsen Lines
- Builder: California Shipbuilding Company, Los Angeles
- Laid down: December 19, 1944
- Launched: January 27, 1945
- Completed: March 12, 1945
- Fate: sold 1947

Netherlands
- Name: SS Axeldijk 1947
- Operator: Holland America Line
- Renamed: SS Axeldyk 1954
- Fate: Sold

Liberia
- Name: SS Monique 1963
- Operator: International Union Marine Corp
- Fate: Sold

Liberia
- Name: SS Monique 1965
- Operator: Pacific Coast Shipping Co
- Identification: IMO number: 5239606
- Fate: Scrapped 1971

General characteristics
- Class & type: VC2-S-AP3 Victory ship
- Tonnage: 7,612 GRT; 4,553 NRT
- Displacement: 15,200 tons
- Length: 455 ft (139 m)
- Beam: 62 ft (19 m)
- Draught: 28 ft (8.5 m)
- Installed power: 8,500 shp (6,300 kW)
- Propulsion: HP & LP turbines geared to a single 20.5-foot (6.2 m) propeller
- Speed: 16.5 knots (30.6 km/h; 19.0 mph)
- Boats & landing craft carried: 4 Lifeboats
- Complement: 62 Merchant Marine and 28 US Naval Armed Guards
- Armament: 1 × 5 in (127 mm)/38 caliber gun; 1 × 3 in (76 mm)/50 caliber gun; 8 × 20 mm Oerlikon

SS Colby Victory was the 84th Victory ship built during World War II under the Emergency Shipbuilding program. She was launched by the California Shipbuilding Company on January 27, 1945, and completed on March 12, 1945. The ship’s United States Maritime Commission designation was VC2- S- AP3, hull number V50, built in 83 days. SS Colby Victory served in the Pacific Ocean during World War II. The 10,500-ton Victory ships were designed to replace the earlier Liberty ships. Liberty ships were designed to be used just for World War II. Victory ships were designed to last longer and serve after the war. The Victory ship differed from Liberty ships in that they were faster, longer and wider, taller, a thinner stack set further toward the superstructure and had a long raised forecastle.

In the fall of 1946, Colby Victory arrived in New York Harbor from Bremerhaven, Germany with troops. Colby Victory and 96 other Victory ships were converted to troop ships to bring the US soldiers home as part of Operation Magic Carpet.

== Post war ==
Colby Victory was sold in 1947 to the Dutch government and transferred to Holland America Line and renamed the SS Axeldijk. SS Axeldijk steamed from Rotterdam to Cuba and Mexico, and then to New Orleans. In 1950 and 1951, she steam on the Red Star Line. In 1952, she was operated back on the Holland America Line until 1959. Holland America Line renamed her the SS Axeldyk in 1954. She was sold in 1963 to International Union Marine Corp of Monrovia, Liberia and renamed the SS Monique. In 1965, the vessel was sold to Pacific Coast Shipping Company of Monrovia and kept the name SS Monique. In 1971, she was scrapped in Taiwan.

== See also ==
- List of Victory ships
- Liberty ship
- Type C1 ship
- Type C2 ship
- Type C3 ship

== Sources ==
- Sawyer, L.A. and W.H. Mitchell. Victory ships and tankers: The history of the ‘Victory’ type cargo ships and of the tankers built in the United States of America during World War II, Cornell Maritime Press, 1974, 0-87033-182-5.
- United States Maritime Commission:
- Victory Cargo Ships
