= USS Hendry =

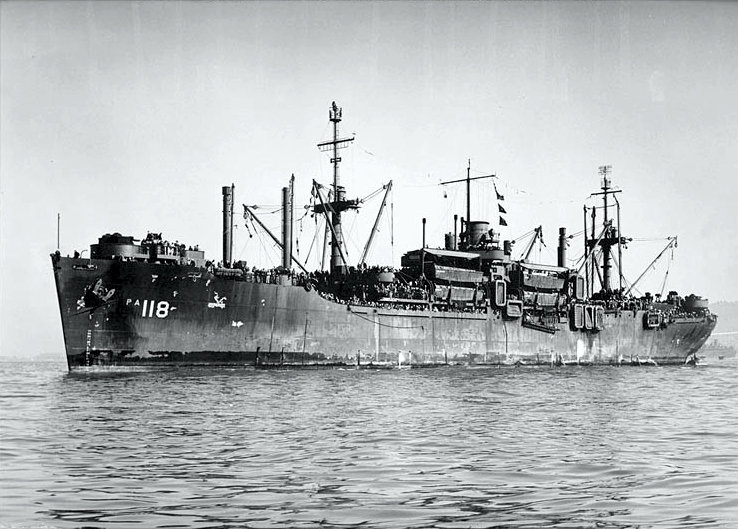
- USS Hendry (APA-118) in San Francisco Bay, California, probably in late 1945 returning troops from the western Pacific to the United States as part of "Operation Magic Carpet."

History

United States
- Name: USS Hendry
- Namesake: Hendry County, Florida
- Builder: California Shipbuilding
- Launched: 24 June 1944
- Commissioned: 29 September 1944
- Decommissioned: 21 February 1946
- Honors and awards: 2 Battle stars
- Fate: Sold for scrap, 9 April 1973

General characteristics
- Class & type: Haskell-class attack transport
- Displacement: 6,873 tons (lt), 14,837 t (fl)
- Length: 455 ft (139 m)
- Beam: 62 ft (19 m)
- Draft: 24 ft (7 m)
- Propulsion: 1 × geared turbine (Westinghouse, Joshua Hendy or Allis-Chalmers), 2 × header-type boilers, 1 × propeller, designed 8,500 shp (6,338 kW)
- Speed: 17 knots (31 km/h; 20 mph)
- Boats & landing craft carried: 2 × LCM; 12 × LCVP; 3 × LCPL
- Capacity: Troops: 86 officers, 1,475 enlisted; Cargo: 150,000 cu ft, 2,900 tons
- Complement: 56 officers, 480 enlisted
- Armament: 1 × 5"/38 dual-purpose gun; 4 × twin 40mm guns; 10 × single 20mm guns; late armament, add 1 × 40mm quad mount

USS Hendry (APA-118) was a Haskell-class attack transport of the US Navy that was built and served in World War II. She was of the VC2-S-AP5 Victory ship design type. She was named after Hendry County, Florida.

== World War II service ==
Hendry was launched under United States Maritime Commission contract 24 June 1944 by California Shipbuilding Company, Wilmington, Los Angeles; sponsored by Mrs. James K. Herbert; acquired by the Navy and commissioned 29 September 1944.

Following a rigorous shakedown cruise Hendry sailed 23 October for Pearl Harbor, arriving 29 October. The transport then took part in extended amphibious training operations, designed to bring assault forces and ship's crews to a peak of readiness for the climactic operations ahead in the Pacific. She departed 11 December with troops to Midway, returning 9 days later, and got underway again 27 January, this time for the giant invasion of Iwo Jima. Hendry arrived Saipan to join the invasion fleet 11 February, and departed 16 February for Iwo Jima. Her troops were among the initial invasion forces early on the morning of 19 February, and for the 6 days that followed Hendry unloaded troops and supplies on the beaches, retiring at night under escort protection. Her gunners were busy during this dangerous period; Japanese planes succeeded in sinking escort carrier USS Bismarck Sea (CVE-95) and damaging USS Saratoga (CV-3) but suffered heavy losses. Hendry sailed for Saipan 25 February, arriving 3 days later.

Hendry remained in the Saipan area until late March, taking part in training for the largest amphibious operation of the Pacific, the capture of Okinawa in Japan's back yard. She sailed 27 March as part of a mighty armada, called by British observers "the most audacious and complex enterprise yet undertaken by the American amphibious forces." Arriving Easter Sunday, the morning of the first landings, Hendry put ashore her troops and for the next 10 days survived fierce kamikaze attacks, which took a heavy toll on American transports and escort vessels in the Okinawa area but were themselves destroyed and did not even check the steady progress of the invasion. Her gunners and those of the supporting ships kept Hendry free from damage until she departed the bitterly contested island 10 April.

After her arrival at Saipan 14 April, the transport sailed to Tulagi, Espiritu Santo, Eniwetok, and Guam, with troop contingents, departing Guam 21 July 1945 for the United States. She arrived San Pedro 6 August and after the surrender sailed 26 August for the western Pacific. Hendry embarked occupation troops at Manila and Lingayen Gulf, Philippines, in late September, and arrived Nagoya, Japan, 7 October. After unloading she sailed again for the United States arriving San Francisco via the Philippines 21 November. On this voyage she was a unit of "Magic Carpet," participating in the gigantic task of bringing home veterans of the Pacific War. After a voyage to Pearl Harbor and return, the ship departed San Diego for the East Coast 14 January 1946, arrived 30 January at Norfolk and decommissioned 21 February. Hendry was placed in the Maritime Commission's National Defense Reserve Fleet on the James River.

== Fate ==
Between 4 April and 29 June 1955 she was withdrawn from the Reserve Fleet for a Repair Program, GAA- So. Atlantic, and returned. Ex-Hendry was sold to Union Minerals & Alloys Corporation for $111,560 on 9 April 1973. At 1140 EDT, on 22 June 1973 she was withdrawn from the Reserve Fleet and sent to the breaker's yard.

== Awards ==
Hendry received two battle stars for World War II service.
