= USS Kittson =

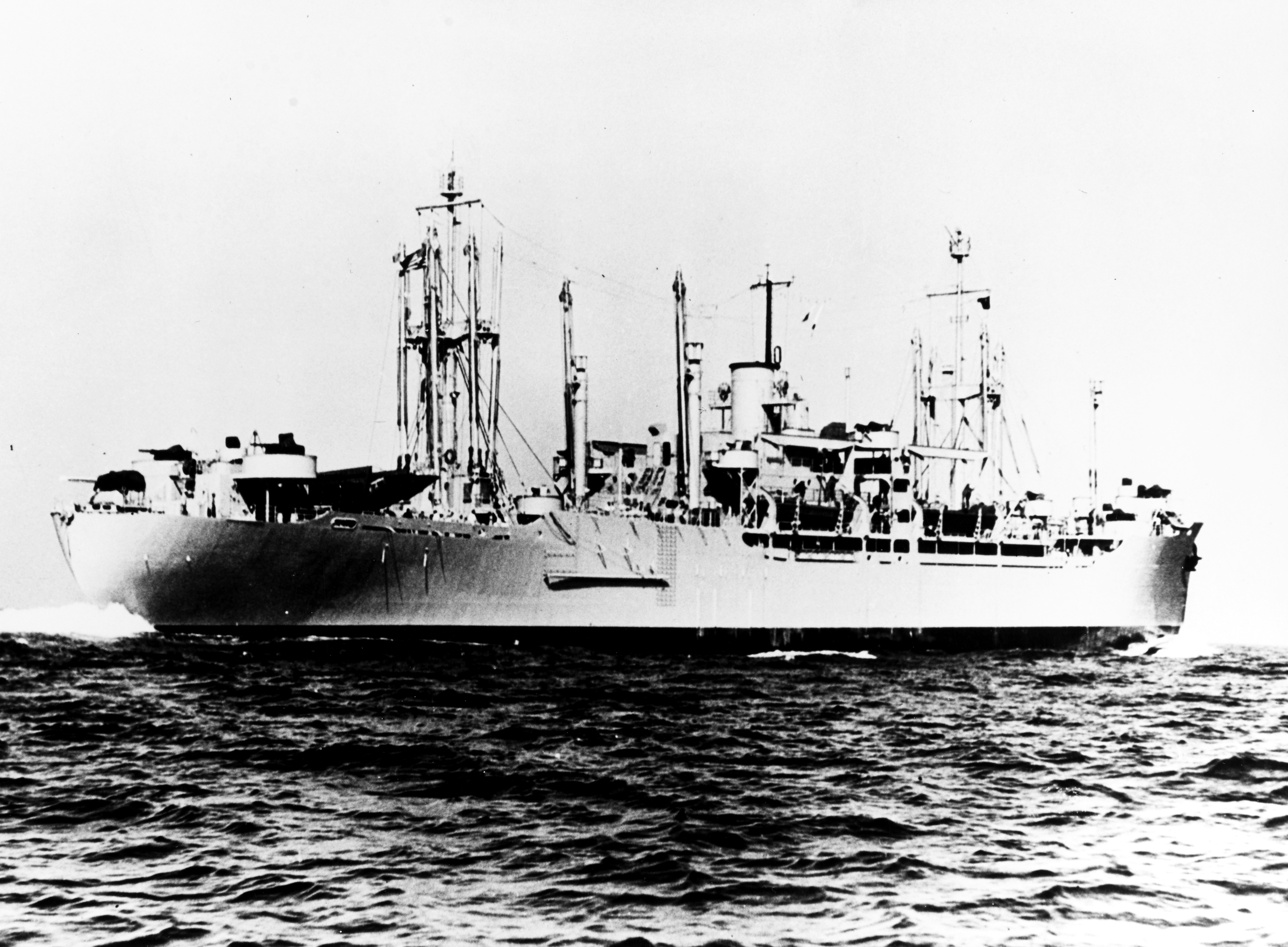

History

United States
- Name: USS Kittson
- Namesake: Kittson County, Minnesota
- Builder: California Shipbuilding Corporation
- Launched: 28 August 1944
- Commissioned: 5 November 1944
- Decommissioned: 11 March 1946
- Honors and awards: 1 Battle star
- Fate: Sold for scrap, 9 April 1973

General characteristics
- Class & type: Haskell-class attack transport
- Displacement: 6,873 tons (lt), 14,837 t (fl)
- Length: 455 ft (139 m)
- Beam: 62 ft (19 m)
- Draft: 24 ft (7 m)
- Propulsion: 1 × geared turbine, 2 × header-type boilers, 1 × propeller, designed 8,500 shp (6,338 kW)
- Speed: 17 knots (31 km/h; 20 mph)
- Boats & landing craft carried: 2 × LCM; 12 × LCVP; 3 × LCPL
- Capacity: Troops: 86 officers, 1,475 enlisted; Cargo: 150,000 cu ft, 2,900 tons
- Complement: 56 officers, 480 enlisted
- Armament: 1 × 5"/38 dual-purpose gun; 4 × twin 40mm guns; 10 × single 20mm guns; late armament, add 1 × 40mm quad mount

USS Kittson (APA-123) was a Haskell-class attack transport in service with the United States Navy from 1944 to 1946. She was scrapped in 1973.

== History ==
Kittson was of the VC2-S-AP5 Victory ship design type and was named for Kittson County, Minnesota. She was launched 28 August 1944 by the California Shipbuilding Corp., Wilmington, Los Angeles, under a United States Maritime Commission contract; acquired by the Navy 4 November 1944; and commissioned 5 November.

After shakedown along the Pacific coast, Kittson cleared San Diego 26 December 1944 with the 4th Marine Aircraft Wing aboard. She arrived Majuro 12 January 1945; unloaded the Marine unit; and sailed for Leyte, arriving 1 February. While operating in the Philippines for the next 6 weeks, the attack transport prepared for the Okinawa invasion.

Departing Leyte 27 March with units of the 7th Division on board, Kittson arrived off Hagushi Beach, Okinawa, 1 April. After the air was cleared of enemy aircraft, the transports commenced unloading troops and cargo for the largest amphibious assault to take place in the Pacific. Kittson stood off the area unloading cargo and assisting in smoke screen operations until she sailed for the West Coast 7 April and Pearl Harbor. She steamed into San Francisco Bay 30 May, loaded cargo and sailors for the final push on Japan, and cleared port 6 June.

Stopping at Eniwetok and Ulithi en route, Kittson arrived Okinawa 24 July, unloaded cargo, and steamed toward Guam. While the transport was at Guam, hostilities ended; and she was assigned to ferry occupation troops to Japan. She made two runs from Cebu, Philippines, to Japan before clearing Tokyo Bay with troops for China. Arriving Taku Bay 24 October, Kittson was assigned to "Magic-Carpet" duty and sailed with her first group of returning veterans 2 November, arriving San Diego 24 November. After completing another "Magic-Carpet" cruise to Japan, the transport tied up at San Pedro 13 January 1946. Kittson sailed for the East Coast, arriving Norfolk 4 February, and decommissioned 11 March 1946. She was returned to the Maritime Commission 2 days later. Kittson was placed in the National Defense Reserve Fleet and was berthed at James River, Virginia.

=== Fate ===
In 1956 Kittson was withdrawn from the Reserve Fleet as part of a Repair Program, GAA-A.L. Burbank, and then returned. On 9 April 1973 she was sold to Union Minerals and Alloys Corporation, for $111,560, to be scrapped. At 1330 EDT, on 4 June 1973 she was withdrawn from the Reserve Fleet and sent to the breaker's yard.

All that remains of Kittson is her brass builder's plate.

== Awards ==
Kittson received one battle star for World War II service.
