= USS Arenac =

20th-century American attack transport

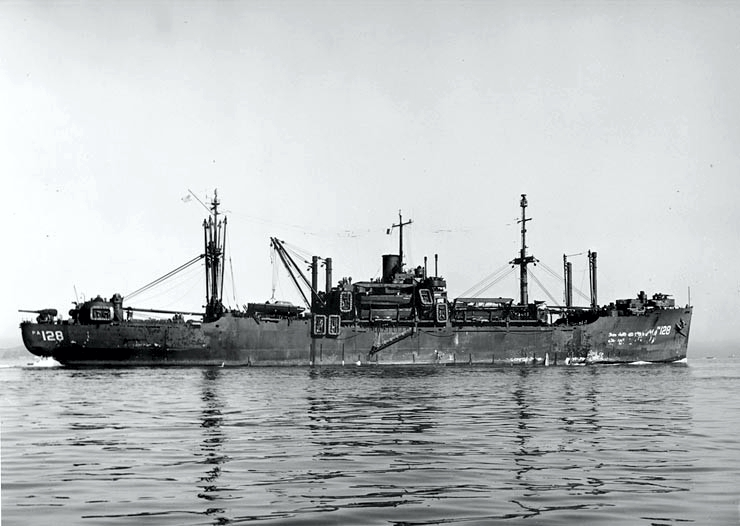

History

United States
- Name: USS Arenac
- Namesake: Arenac County, Michigan
- Builder: California Shipbuilding Corporation
- Laid down: 9 July 1944
- Launched: 14 September 1944
- Commissioned: 8 January 1945
- Decommissioned: 10 July 1946
- Stricken: 1 October 1958
- Honors and awards: 1 Battle star
- Fate: Sold for scrap, 21 August 1974

General characteristics
- Class & type: Haskell-class attack transport
- Displacement: 6,873 tons (lt), 14,837 t (fl)
- Length: 455 ft (139 m)
- Beam: 62 ft (19 m)
- Draft: 24 ft (7 m)
- Propulsion: 1 × Joshua Hendy geared turbine, 2 × Babcock & Wilcox (450 psi) header-type boilers, 1 × propeller, designed 8,500 shp (6,338 kW)
- Speed: 17 knots (31 km/h; 20 mph)
- Boats & landing craft carried: 2 × LCM; 12 × LCVP; 3 × LCPL
- Capacity: Troops: 86 officers, 1,475 enlisted; Cargo: 150,000 cu ft, 2,900 tons
- Complement: 56 officers, 480 enlisted
- Sensors & processing systems: SG Radar, SA Radar
- Armament: 1 × 5"/38 dual-purpose gun; 4 × dual Bofors 40 mm cannon; 10 × single Oerlikon 20 mm cannon; 1 x quad 40 mm Bofors cannon

USS Arenac (APA-128) was a Haskell-class attack transport in service with the United States Navy from 1945 to 1946. She was scrapped in 1974.

== History ==
Arenac was of the VC2-S-AP5 Victory ship design type and was named for Arenac County, Michigan. She was laid down under a United States Maritime Commission contract (MCV hull 44) on 9 July 1944 at Wilmington, Los Angeles, by the California Shipbuilding Corporation; launched on 14 September 1944; sponsored by Mrs. L.D. Worsham; delivered to the Moore Dry Dock Company, Oakland, California, on 24 September 1944 for completion; acquired by the U.S. Navy and placed in commission, 8 January 1945.

After shakedown and amphibious training exercises off San Diego, California, Arenac took on a load of cargo and departed for Hawaii. On 3 February 1945, Arenac was designated the flagship for Combat Transport Division (COMTRANSDIV) 68, under the command of Commodore Chauncey Crutcher. She arrived at Pearl Harbor on 17 March 1945 and during the next two months operated out of Pearl Harbor carrying personnel and cargo to Eniwetok and Guam.

On 12 May, Arenac arrived at Ulithi, Caroline Islands, and there embarked troops and took on supplies for support of the invasion of Okinawa. She got underway for that island on 23 May and anchored in waters off Okinawa on the 27th. While awaiting clearance to proceed to the beaches to unload her cargo Arenac underwent frequent alerts for enemy air attack. She moored off Hagushi Beach on 3 June, finished unloading her cargo and passengers by the 5th, and then began taking on personnel for evacuation from Okinawa. The transport left the area on 6 June and set a course for Saipan.

Arenac paused at Saipan on the 12th to discharge a few of her passengers, continued on to Guam on the 13th, and remained in port there for six days before returning to Saipan on 20 June. She then began preparations to return to Okinawa. After a stop at Ulithi en route, the vessel arrived back at Okinawa on 5 July.

Following discharge of her cargo, Arenac got underway on 8 July to return to the West Coast of the United States. Port calls at Saipan and Guam preceded the transport's arrival at San Francisco, California, on 28 July. Three days later, the vessel entered a shipyard at Richmond, California for an intermediate maintenance availability. She resumed operations on 11 August and made a course for Pearl Harbor. While the ship was en route, she received word of Japan's capitulation ending World War II. Arenac arrived in Hawaiian waters on the 17th and took on personnel for passage to the western Pacific. She set sail for Eniwetok on the 20th and after a brief pause at that atoll, stood out to sea to rendezvous with a convoy bound for Ulithi.

Arenac reached Ulithi on 31 August. She got underway for the Philippines four days later and arrived at Manila on 9 September. She debarked her passengers there before moving on to San Fabian, Luzon, on the 18th to take on cargo and embarked troops (3/161 Infantry Regiment, 25th Infantry Division) for transportation to Japan. The ship set sail on 1 October and arrived at Wakayama, Japan on 7 October. However, before her passengers went ashore, she was ordered out of the area because of an approaching typhoon. The ship finally put into port at Nagoya, Japan, on 28 October and proceeded to debark her troops for occupation duty. On that same day, the transport was assigned to Service Force, Pacific Fleet for Operation Magic Carpet, transporting "high-point" military personnel from Japan and the Philippines to the West Coast of the United States for discharge.

After off-loading passengers and equipment at Nagoya, Arenac set a course for the Philippines on 30 October 1945, and arrived at Guiuan, Samar on 4 November. "High-point" Navy and Army personnel were loaded for transport to San Francisco for discharge, but while en route, Arenac was diverted to Seattle, Washington instead, and arrived there on 25 November 1945.

After necessary voyage repairs and a period of liberty for the crew, Arenac resumed operations. On 8 December 1945, she got underway for Nagoya, Japan but was diverted en route to the Naval Base at Sasebo on the island of Kyushu, Japan, arriving on 31 December 1945. The ship debarked the Navy replacement passengers, then four days later departed for Nagoya, arriving on 6 January 1946, embarking veterans for return to stateside and discharge. Arenac made three round-trip Pacific crossings in this service. The Operation Magic Carpet assignment was completed in March 1946, and the ship was ordered to the East Coast of the United States for deactivation. The transport transited the Panama Canal and then continued on to Norfolk, Virginia.

Proceeding to the Norfolk Naval Shipyard, Portsmouth, Virginia on 8 April 1946 and then the Naval Mine Depot at Yorktown, Virginia, Arenac was decommissioned on 10 July 1946. She was transferred to the National Defense Reserve Fleet, James River Group at Fort Eustis, Virginia.

=== Fate ===
On 14 January 1959, the ship was transferred to the Maritime Administration at the same location. Her name was struck from the Navy List on 1 October 1958. On 21 August 1974 she was sold to Consolidated Steel Corporation, for US$298,999, to be scrapped. At 1425 EDT, on 25 October 1974 she was withdrawn from the Reserve Fleet and sent to the breaker's yard.

== Awards ==
Arenac earned one battle star for her World War II service. The USS Arenac earned campaign streamers for: - American Campaign - Asiatic-Pacific Campaign

Additional Awards: - World War II Victory Medal - Navy Occupation Service Medal w/ Japan Clasp (for the period 3 Oct 45 to 2 Nov 45 for the occupation landings at Nagoya, Japan)
