= SS U.S.S.R. Victory =

Victory ship of the United States

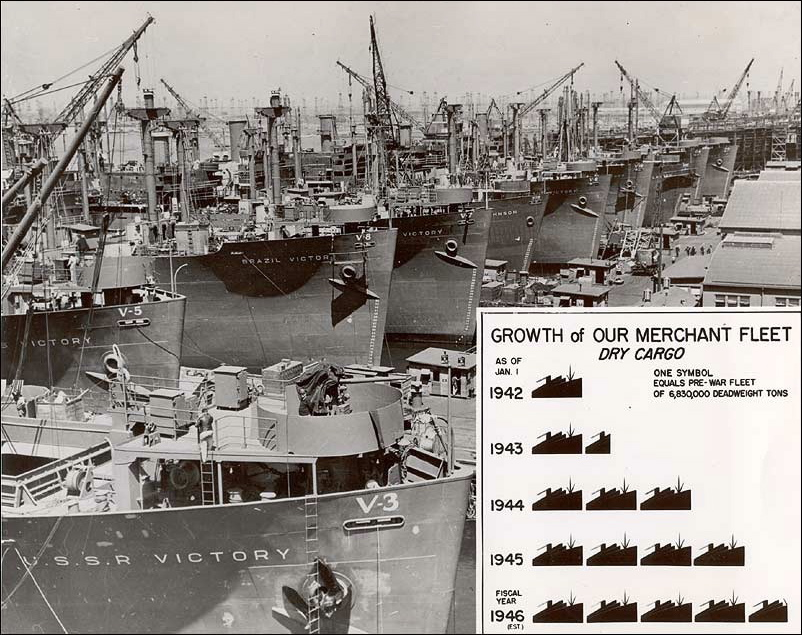
- The front ship, with V-3 on the hull, is U.S.S.R. Victory.

History

United States
- Name: U.S.S.R. Victory
- Namesake: Union of Soviet Socialist Republics (Soviet Union)
- Owner: War Shipping Administration
- Operator: Moore-McCormack Lines, Inc.
- Builder: California Shipbuilding Company, Los Angeles
- Laid down: January 3, 1944
- Launched: February 26, 1944
- Completed: April 26, 1944
- Identification: Official number: 245247
- Fate: Sold March 7, 1947

India
- Name: Indian Navigator
- Namesake: India
- Owner: India Steamship Co, Calcutta
- Operator: India Steamship Company
- Fate: Sank 2 January 1961

General characteristics
- Class & type: VC2-S-AP3 Victory ship
- Tonnage: 7,612 GRT, 4,553 NRT
- Displacement: 15,200 tons
- Length: 455 ft (139 m)
- Beam: 62 ft (19 m)
- Draught: 28 ft (8.5 m)
- Installed power: 8,500 shp (6,300 kW)
- Propulsion: HP & LP turbines geared to a single 20.5-foot (6.2 m) propeller, by Westinghouse Electric & Mfg. Co., Essington
- Speed: 16.5 knots (30.6 km/h; 19.0 mph)
- Boats & landing craft carried: 4 lifeboats
- Complement: 62 Merchant Marine and 28 US Naval Armed Guards
- Armament: 1 × 5-inch (127 mm)/38 caliber gun as Victory ship; 1 × 3-inch (76 mm)/50 caliber gun; 8 × 20 mm Oerlikon

SS U.S.S.R. Victory was the third Victory ship built during World War II under the Emergency Shipbuilding program. She was launched by the California Shipbuilding Company on February 26, 1944. The ship was completed and delivered to the wartime operator of all United States oceangoing shipping, the War Shipping Administration (WSA), on April 26, 1944. U.S.S.R. Victory, official number 245247, was assigned to Moore-McCormack Lines, Inc., under a standard WSA operating agreement at that time. That agreement continued until the ship's sale on March 7, 1947. The ship’s United States Maritime Commission designation was VC2-S-AP3, hull number 3 (V-3). U.S.S.R. Victory served in the Atlantic Ocean during World War II.

U.S.S.R. Victory was one of the new 10,500-ton class ship to be known as Victory ships. Victory ships were designed to replace the earlier Liberty ships. Liberty ships were designed to be used just for World War II. Victory ships were designed to last longer and serve the US Navy after the war. The Victory ship differed from a Liberty ship in that they were faster, longer and wider, taller, had a thinner stack set farther toward the superstructure and had a long raised forecastle.

U.S.S.R. Victory was christened by Mrs. Inna Pastoev, wife of the Soviet vice-consul. The Soviet vice-consul said at the christening: "another link in the chain of blows that will defeat our enemy," The launching of U.S.S.R. Victory splashed into the water of Wilmington, Los Angeles.

== U.S.S.R namesake ==
U.S.S.R Victory namesake is for the country Union of Soviet Socialist Republics, commonly termed the Soviet Union. In 1941, Nazi Germany began Operation Barbarossa and invaded the Soviet Union. Thus the Soviet Union and the USA became Allies against Nazi Germany.

Typical Victory ship

== World War II ==
U.S.S.R. Victory served as a troop ship to take troops to and from Europe. U.S.S.R. Victory and 96 other Victory ships were converted to troop ships to take troops to Europe. She was later used to bring US soldiers back home as part of Operation Magic Carpet from port cities known as Cigarette Camps. She was able to transport up to 1,500 troops to and from Europe. Her cargo holds were converted to bunk beds and hammocks that stacked three high for hot bunking. In the cargo hold, Mess halls and gyms were also added. On October 31, 1945 she steamed in to Newport News, Virginia, bringing troop home from Europe.

== Korean War ==
U.S.S.R. Victory served as merchant marine ship supplying goods for the Korean War. She helped move the 140th Medium Tank Battalion. About 75 percent of the personnel taken to Korea for the Korean War came by the merchant marine ships. U.S.S.R. Victory transported goods, mail, food and other supplies. About 90 percent of the cargo was moved by merchant marine naval to the war zone. U.S.S.R. Victory made trips between 18 November 1950 and 23 December 1952, helping American forces engaged against Communist aggression in South Korea.

== SS Indian Navigator ==
On March 7, 1947, the ship was sold to the India Steamship Company of Calcutta, India and renamed Indian Navigator. The Indian Navigator was steaming from Hamburg to Calcutta with a cargo of sulphur. On 31 December 1960 she had a cargo hold explosion and fire when she was off the southwestern tip of Cornwall, United Kingdom, near the Isles of Scilly. The crew abandoned ship into the lifeboats after the explosion. She was towed by SS Indian Success, but with another cargo explosion she foundered and sank on 2 January 1961, with loss of life of some marine salvage personal. She is now about 129 meters under water.

== See also ==
- List of Victory ships
- Liberty ship
- Type C1 ship
- Type C2 ship
- Type C3 ship

== Sources ==
- Sawyer, L.A. and W.H. Mitchell. Victory ships and tankers: The history of the ‘Victory’ type cargo ships and of the tankers built in the United States of America during World War II, Cornell Maritime Press, 1974, 0-87033-182-5.
- United States Maritime Commission:
- Victory Cargo Ships
