= USS Attala =

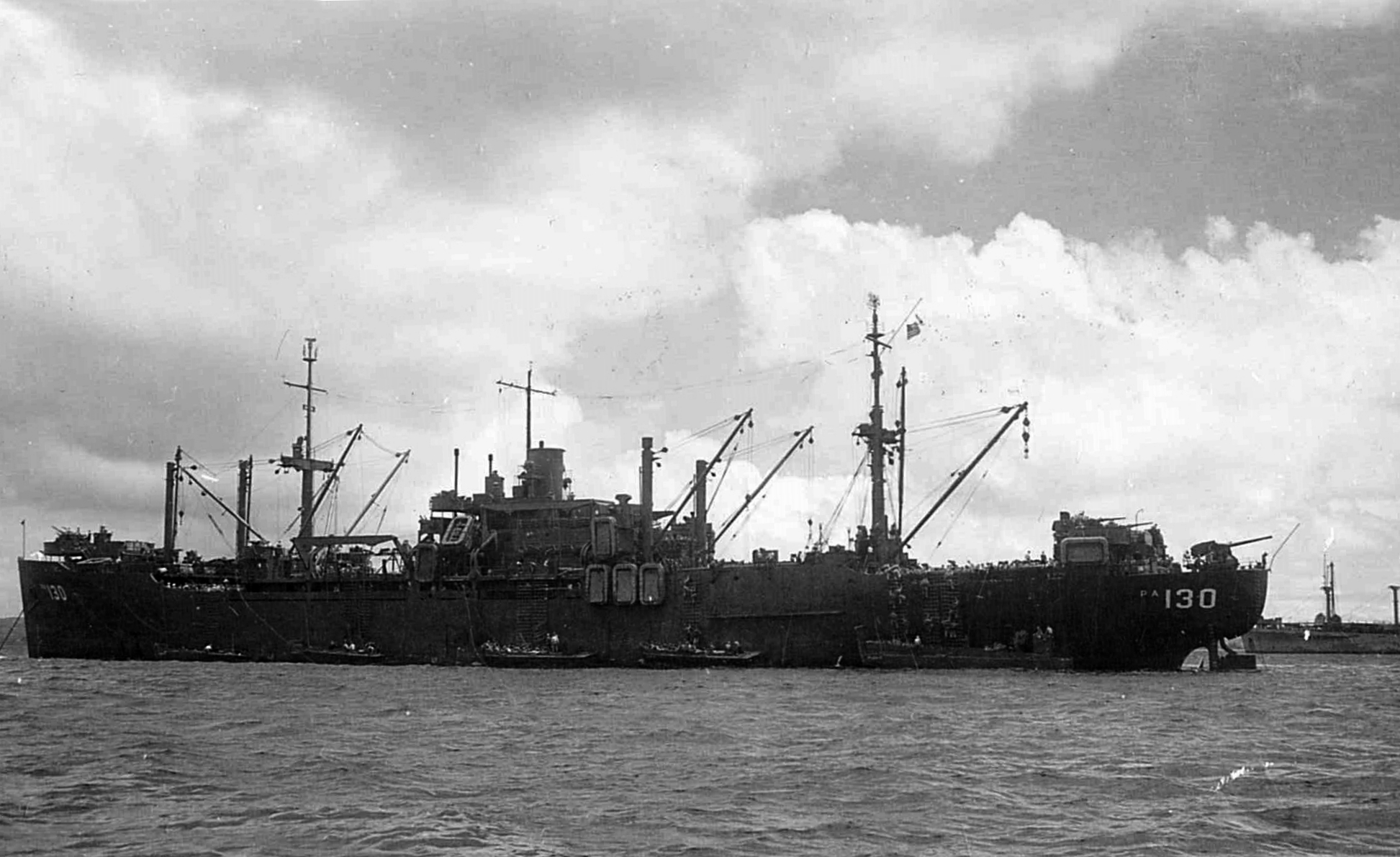

History

United States
- Name: USS Attala
- Namesake: Attala County, Mississippi
- Builder: California Shipbuilding
- Laid down: 18 July 1944
- Launched: 27 September 1944
- Commissioned: 30 November 1944
- Decommissioned: 26 February 1946
- Stricken: 20 March 1946
- Honors and awards: Battle star
- Fate: Sold for scrap, 15 March 1974

General characteristics
- Class & type: Haskell-class attack transport
- Displacement: 6,873 tons (lt), 14,837 t (fl)
- Length: 455 ft (139 m)
- Beam: 62 ft (19 m)
- Draft: 24 ft (7 m)
- Propulsion: 1 × geared turbine, 2 × header-type boilers, 1 × propeller, designed 8,500 shp (6,338 kW)
- Speed: 17 knots (31 km/h; 20 mph)
- Boats & landing craft carried: 2 × LCM; 12 × LCVP; 3 × LCPL
- Capacity: Troops: 86 officers, 1,475 enlisted; Cargo: 150,000 cu ft, 2,900 tons
- Complement: 56 officers, 480 enlisted
- Armament: 1 × 5"/38 dual-purpose gun; 4 × twin 40mm guns; 10 × single 20mm guns; late armament, add 1 × 40mm quad mount

USS Attala (APA-130) was a Haskell-class attack transport in service with the United States Navy from 1944 to 1946. She was scrapped in 1974.

== History ==
Attala was of the VC2-S-AP5 Victory ship design type was named for Attala County, Mississippi. She was laid down under a United States Maritime Commission contract (MCV hull 46) on 18 July 1944 at Wilmington, Los Angeles, by the California Shipbuilding Corporation; launched on 27 September 1944; sponsored by Mrs. Paul Pigott; and simultaneously acquired by the Navy and commissioned on 30 November 1944.

After shakedown training along the west coast, the attack transport departed Seattle, Washington, on 31 January 1945. She paused at Pearl Harbor to embark troops and equipment and then got underway on 9 February, bound for Eniwetok. Attala pushed on to Iwo Jima, where she arrived on 13 March. The ship spent several days there disembarking troops and unloading equipment. On the 18th, Attala moored at Saipan to take on wounded marines for passage back to the United States. She stopped briefly at Pearl Harbor to disembark passengers and then continued on to San Francisco, California.

On 18 April, Attala returned to Pearl Harbor. She then began a week of intensive amphibious training off Maui. Attala embarked replacement personnel, loaded cargo, and got underway on 14 May. She made stops at Saipan and Ulithi before anchoring in Leyte Gulf on 5 June. On that day, she assumed duty as a receiving ship.

Attala left the Philippines on 17 June and made stops at Eniwetok and Pearl Harbor before arriving in San Francisco on 8 July. From 12 until 20 July, Attala was in drydock at a shipyard in Everett, Washington. The ship departed the west coast on 24 July, and on 5 August, reached Eniwetok, where she joined a convoy bound for Okinawa.

On 21 August, Attala dropped anchor off Hagushi beach, Okinawa. Early in September, she took on board troops and equipment slated for occupation duty in Korea. On the 7th, she arrived at Jinsen, Korea, and-after debarking her charges returned to Okinawa.

Attala took on board Marines for transportation to Qingdao, China. She began debarking them there on 21 November. Attala left Chinese waters on the 23rd and began the long journey to the United States. Making only one stop en route at Manila, Philippines, Attala arrived in Los Angeles, California, on 18 December.

After voyage, repairs, and a period of liberty for the crew, Attala resumed operations. On 14 January 1946, she got underway for San Diego, California. The transport transited the Panama Canal on the 23rd and then continued on to Norfolk, Virginia. She anchored off Hampton Roads on 1 February and began the deactivation.

She proceeded to the Norfolk Naval Shipyard, Portsmouth, Virginia, and on 26 February 1946 Attala was decommissioned. She was transferred to the War Shipping Administration for disposal. Her name was struck from the Navy list on 20 March 1946.

=== Fate ===
Attala entered the National Defense Reserve Fleet at James River, Virginia on 3 March 1946. In 1954 Attala was withdrawn from the Reserve Fleet as part of a Repair Program, GAA-No. Atl. & Gulf, and then returned. On 15 March 1974 she was sold to Mr. Isaac Varela, for $727,007, to be scrapped. At 1000 EDT, on 3 April 1974 she was withdrawn from the Reserve Fleet and sent to the breaker's yard.

All that remains of Attala is her brass builder's plate.

== Awards ==
Attala earned one battle star for her World War II service.
