= USS Botetourt =

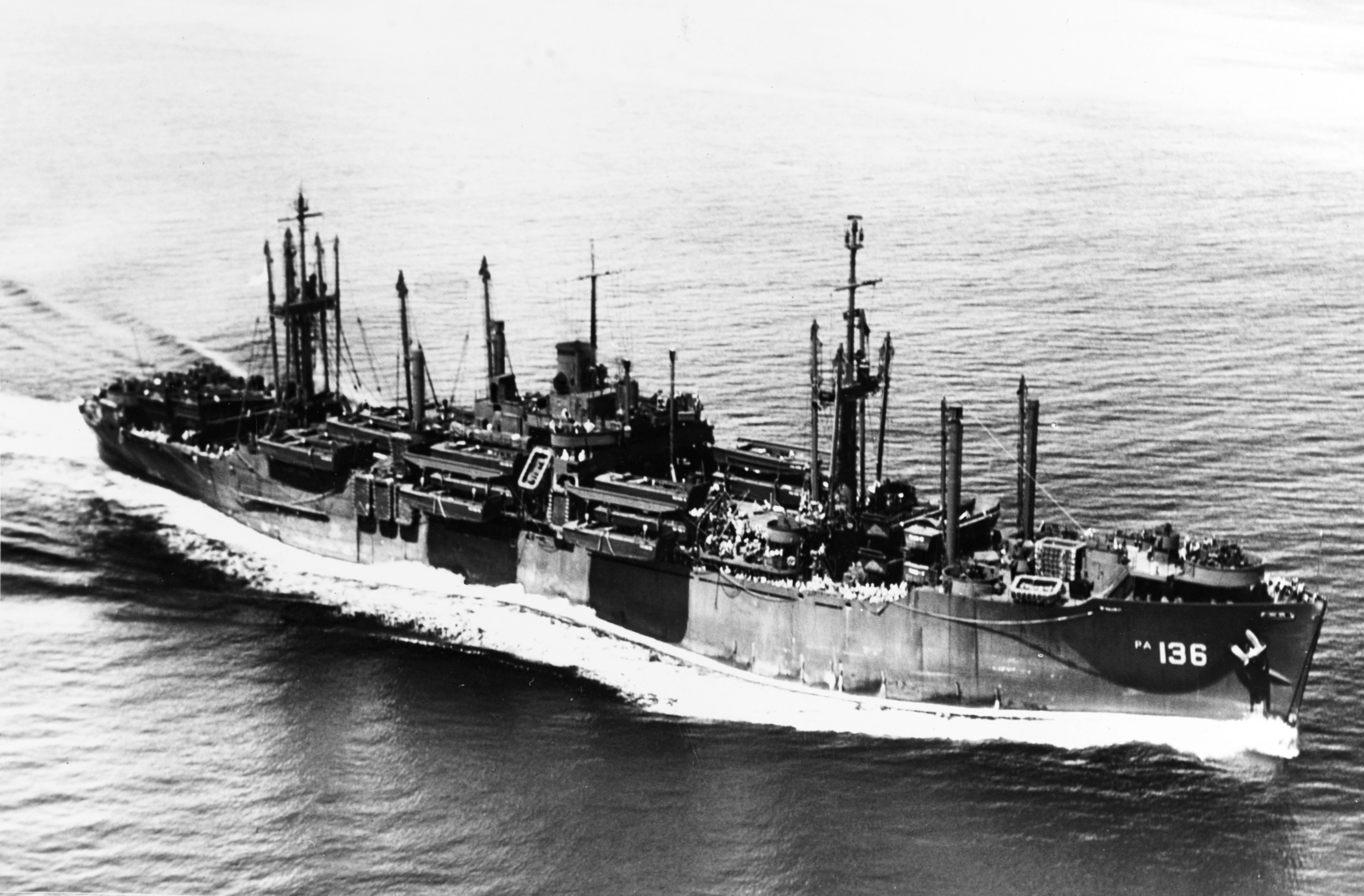
- Botetourt, in May 1945

History

United States
- Name: USS Botetourt
- Namesake: Botetourt County, Virginia
- Builder: California Shipbuilding
- Laid down: 22 August 1944
- Launched: 19 October 1944
- Commissioned: 31 January 1945
- Decommissioned: 27 April 1956
- In service: 23 September 1950
- Out of service: 5 June 1946
- Stricken: 1 July 1961
- Fate: Sold for scrap, 21 August 1974

General characteristics
- Class & type: Haskell-class attack transport
- Displacement: 6,873 tons (lt), 14,837 t (fl)
- Length: 455 ft (139 m)
- Beam: 62 ft (19 m)
- Draft: 24 ft (7 m)
- Propulsion: 1 × geared turbine, 2 × header-type boilers, 1 × propeller, designed 8,500 shp (6,338 kW)
- Speed: 17 knots (31 km/h; 20 mph)
- Boats & landing craft carried: 2 × LCM; 12 × LCVP; 3 × LCPL
- Capacity: Troops: 86 officers, 1,475 enlisted; Cargo: 150,000 cu ft, 2,900 tons
- Complement: 56 officers, 480 enlisted
- Armament: 1 × 5"/38 dual-purpose gun; 4 × twin 40mm guns; 10 × single 20mm guns; late armament, add 1 × 40mm quad mount

USS Botetourt (APA-136) was a Haskell-class attack transport in service with the United States Navy from 1945 to 1946 and from 1950 to 1956. She was scrapped in 1974.

== History ==
=== World War II service ===
Botetourt was a Victory ship design, VC2-S-AP5 and was named after Botetourt County, Virginia, United States. She was laid down on 22 August 1944 at Wilmington, Los Angeles, by the California Shipbuilding Corp. under a United States Maritime Commission contract (MCV hull 52); launched on 19 October 1944; sponsored by Mrs. Robert C. Todd; moved to Oakland, California, on 28 October 1944 for outfitting by the Moore Dry Dock Co.; delivered to the Navy on 31 January 1945; and commissioned that same day.

Following shakedown training out of San Pedro, Los Angeles, and amphibious exercises at San Diego, California, Botetourt completed post-shakedown availability at San Pedro and then moved to San Francisco to load troops and equipment. On 8 April, the attack transport got underway for the New Hebrides Islands. She arrived at Espiritu Santo on 22 April. From that time through the end of hostilities in mid-August, the ship transported troops and cargo between many of the islands in the rear areas of the western and southwestern Pacific. She was at Luzon in the Philippine Islands on 15 August 1945 when the Japanese agreed to capitulate.

After embarking Japan-bound occupation troops, she departed Manila on 27 August in company with the other elements of Task Force (TF) 33. The convoy entered Tokyo Bay on 2 September, the same day that Allied and Japanese representatives formalized the surrender on board USS Missouri (BB-63). She unloaded cargo and disembarked troops before heading back to the Philippines on the 4th. The attack transport reached Leyte in the Philippines on 11 September and spent the next 10 days on the interisland circuit. On 22 September, Botetourt set sail from Abuyog, Leyte, on her way to the Ryukyus. She arrived at Okinawa on the 25th and—except for a brief period at sea to avoid a typhoon—remained there until early October. On 3 October, she put to sea and headed for Japan with additional occupation troops embarked. The attack transport disembarked her passengers at Aki Nada, Japan, between 5 and 10 October. On the 11th, the ship headed back to Okinawa, where she took on homeward-bound servicemen between the 13th and 16th. She resumed her voyage on the 16th and arrived in San Francisco on the 30th. Botetourt remained in San Francisco until 15 November, when she headed back to the western Pacific. She shuttled passengers between Korea and Japan until January 1946, during which month she returned to the West Coast of the United States.

On 24 January 1946, the attack transport departed Portland, Oregon, on her way to the east coast. She made a stop at San Francisco, transited the Panama Canal, and arrived in Norfolk, Virginia, where she reported to the Commander, 16th (Atlantic Reserve) Fleet for inactivation overhaul. Botetourt was decommissioned on 5 June 1946 and berthed with the Norfolk Group, Atlantic Reserve Fleet. There she remained until American participation in the United Nations' effort to stem North Korean aggression in the summer of 1950 brought an increased need for ships in the active Navy.

=== Korean War era service ===
Botetourt was recommissioned at Norfolk on 23 September 1950. Botetourt spent the rest of 1950 outfitting and conducting shakedown training. January 1951 brought post-shakedown availability at the Norfolk Naval Shipyard. She completed repairs on 27 January and, after a week of preparations, put to sea to begin operations out of Norfolk. Between late February and mid-June, the attack transport participated in a series of amphibious exercises and troop lifts. When not so engaged, she conducted independent ship's exercises and type training. In port, upkeep and maintenance occupied her time. On 15 June, she departed Norfolk for Morehead City, North Carolina, where she embarked marines. From there, Botetourt started out across the Atlantic on the only Mediterranean deployment of her career. While serving with the 6th Fleet, she participated in amphibious exercises at Sardinia, Crete, and Malta and visited ports in France, Greece, Italy, and Algeria. The attack transport departed Oran, Algeria, on 20 September and laid in a course for the United States. Botetourt disembarked her marine contingent at Morehead City on 30 September and reentered Norfolk immediately thereafter.

Her return to Norfolk heralded a resumption of troop lifts and amphibious exercises. Between mid-October and mid-November, she participated in an exercise at Vieques Island in the West Indies and in a similar evolution at Onslow Beach, North Carolina, upon her return. Botetourt reentered Norfolk on 18 November and enjoyed an extended leave and liberty period through the end of the year.

The first three months of 1952 brought more local operations out of Norfolk. On 1 April 1952, she entered the Norfolk Naval Shipyard for a two-month regular overhaul. At the conclusion of the repair period, the attack transport headed south to Guantánamo Bay, Cuba, for refresher training. Upon her return to Norfolk, she conducted additional amphibious training at Little Creek, Virginia In August, Botetourt made a round-trip voyage from the United States to Bremerhaven, Germany, to carry 1,600 Army troops there.

She returned to Norfolk early in September and, after two weeks of upkeep, resumed normal operations out of her home port. Botetourt continued in active service for a little more than three years. Her assignments during that time were quite repetitious. She participated in landing exercise after landing exercise—most frequently at Vieques Island or Onslow Beach. Those duties were punctuated with training cruises for naval reservists and summer training cruises for Naval Academy and NROTC midshipmen. Throughout that period, she operated either along the east coast or in the West Indies.

On 14 November 1955, Botetourt got underway from Norfolk bound for Philadelphia and inactivation. She arrived at her destination that same day and began preparations for inactivation immediately.

=== Final decommissioning and fate ===
On 27 April 1956, Botetourt was placed out of commission and was berthed with the Philadelphia Group, Atlantic Reserve Fleet. On 12 December 1960, she entered the Maritime Administration's National Defense Reserve Fleet at James River, Virginia. Her name was struck from the Navy list on 1 July 1961. She was sold for $288,166 to Union Minerals & Alloys Corporation for scrapping on 21 August 1974. At 1035 EDT, on 10 October 1974 she was withdrawn from the Reserve Fleet and sent to the breaker's yard.
