= California Shipbuilding Corporation =

US shipyard (1941–1945)

Coordinates: 33°45′40″N 118°15′05″W

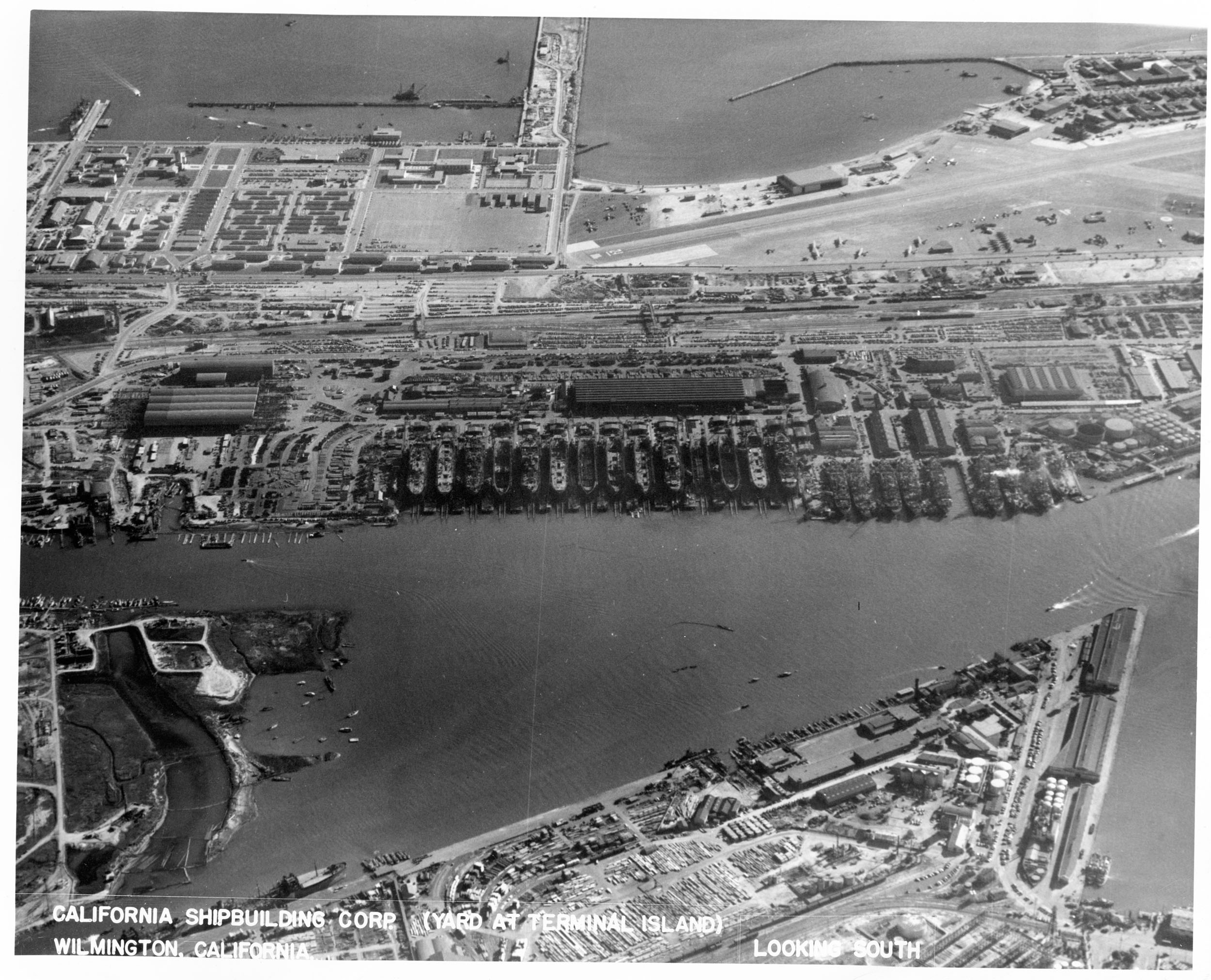
CalShip yard in 1944

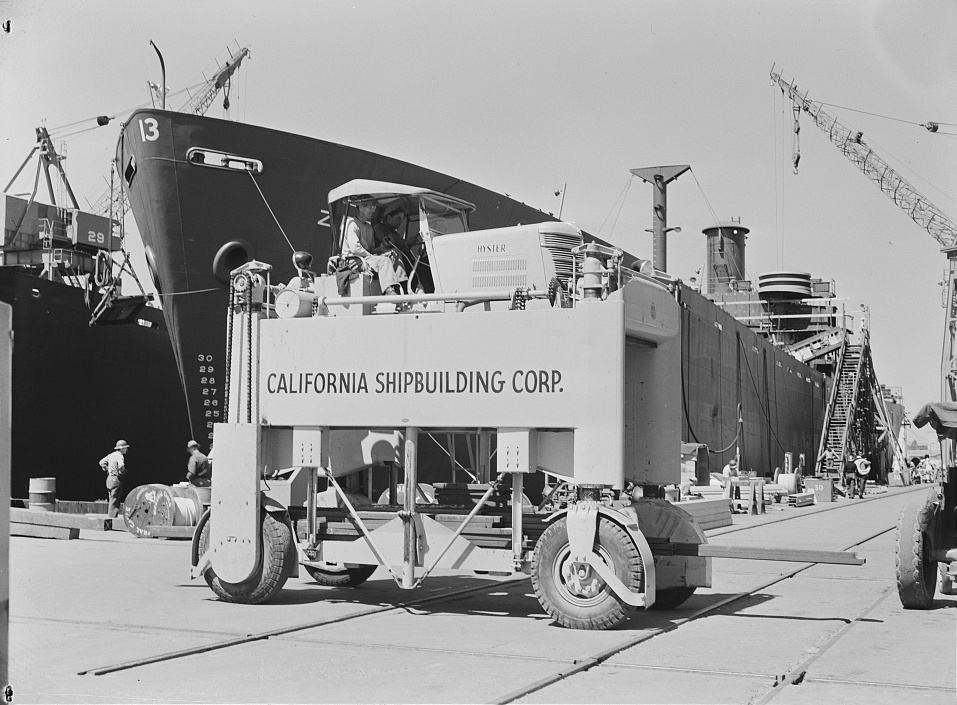
Motorized hoisting truck used in moving scaffolding timbers around the shipyard, 1942.

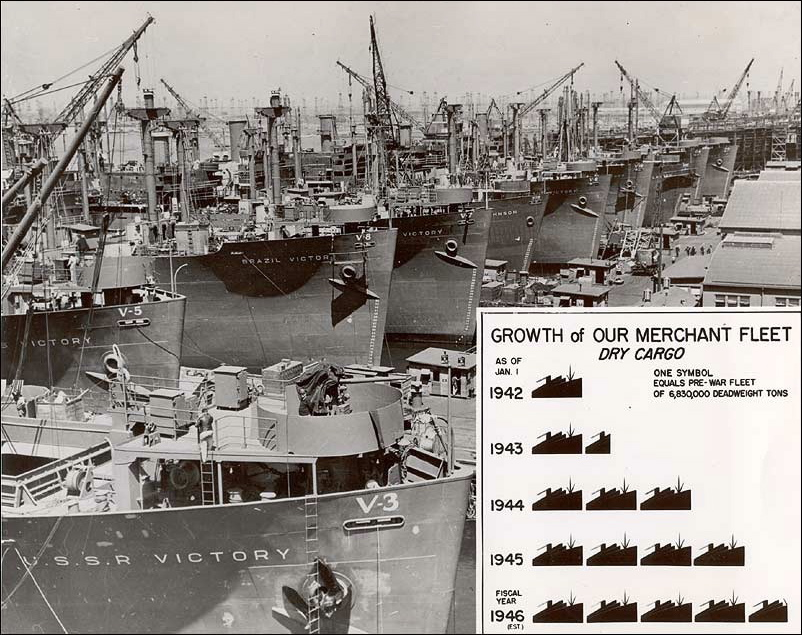
Calship fitting out its first Victory ships, c. early 1944

California Shipbuilding Corporation built 467 Liberty and Victory ships during World War II, including Haskell-class attack transports. California Shipbuilding Corporation was often referred to as Calship.

== History ==
In 1916 the California Shipbuilding Company built a few submarines in the Craig Shipbuilding Company yard in Long Beach. There is no relationship other than the name of the company.

The Calship shipyard was created at Terminal Island in Los Angeles, California, United States as part of America's massive shipbuilding effort of World War II. W. A. Bechtel Co. was given sponsorship and executive direction of Calship. As of 1940, Los Angeles shipyards had not built a large ship in 20 years. By late 1941 though, shipbuilding had become the second largest manufacturing industry in the Los Angeles area.

Calship was created from scratch with ground broken on January 27, then for a planned 8-way yard. It began production of Liberty Ships in May 1941. In the early 1940s, contracts from the U.S. Department of Maritime Commission and a number of U.S. Navy contracts led to prosperity shipbuilding business in Los Angeles. The yard was located on 175 acres on the north side of Terminal Island, north of Dock Street, near present-day berths 210-213. It initially had 8 ways, and later increased this to 14. 40,000 men and women worked under the military contract to construction of 467 vessels over 5 years. The combination of these ships were known as the "Liberty Fleet". These cargo ships were designed for rapid construction with lower costs for them. Thirteen months after commencing production, the yard broke the record by delivering 15 Liberty Ships in June 1942. It delivered 111 ships in 1942, more than any other yard in the United States. In June 1943, it broke the record again by delivering 20 ships for the month, and yet again in December 1943, delivering 23 ships.

Large Navy contracts developed shipbuilding in California. As a result of that, many workers migrated to the work area. Many shipyards sprang up from San Francisco to San Diego. At the peak of shipbuilding in California were involved 282,000 persons. Shipbuilding became a highly efficient wartime industry. The building of vessels and the number of jobs in the shipbuilding peaked in mid-1943.

The Calship yard was known as "the city built on invisible stilts." It was situated on marshy ground, and was built on artificial earth supported by 57,000 piles driven into the mud. Shipbuilding commenced before the fitting-out docks were even completed. The yard's workers came from every region of the United States, reaching a force of 40,000 men and women, only 1% of whom had any shipbuilding experience whatsoever.

The Calship Log, aimed at "Calshippers" and "Calshipperettes", was published on the 1st and 15th of each month. The log covered the progress of working for the war effort, safety rules, policies and procedures, as well as leisure activities and information on public transport, gasoline rations, personal tax increases and war bonds. A Victory Edition was published on September 27, 1945.

After the war, the Maritime Commission and the Navy department cancelled their contracts with Calship. As the result of that, the level of shipbuilding began to decline. Calship closed in September 1945, after launching the last Victory ship, "four years to the minute after the first slid into the water." Calship ranked 49th among United States corporations in the value of World War II military production contracts.

In 1947 the Calship facility was taken over by National Metal & Steel Corporation which operated a scrap yard there. Ironically, 55 of the Liberty and Victory ships that were built at Calship were scrapped on the same site.

Output of Calship
Quantity	Design	Type	Use
306	EC2-S-C1	Liberty ship	cargo transport
30	Z-ET1-S-C3	Liberty ship	tanker
32	VC2-S-AP3	Victory ship	cargo transport, 8,500 hp
30	VC2-S-AP5	Haskell class	USN attack transport
69	VC2-S-AP2	Victory ship	cargo transport, 6,000 hp

The surviving museum ships: SS American Victory and SS Lane Victory, were built in the Calship yard. The SS American Victory is in Tampa, Florida and the SS Lane Victory is in Los Angeles. They are open to the public for dockside tours and also sail periodically.

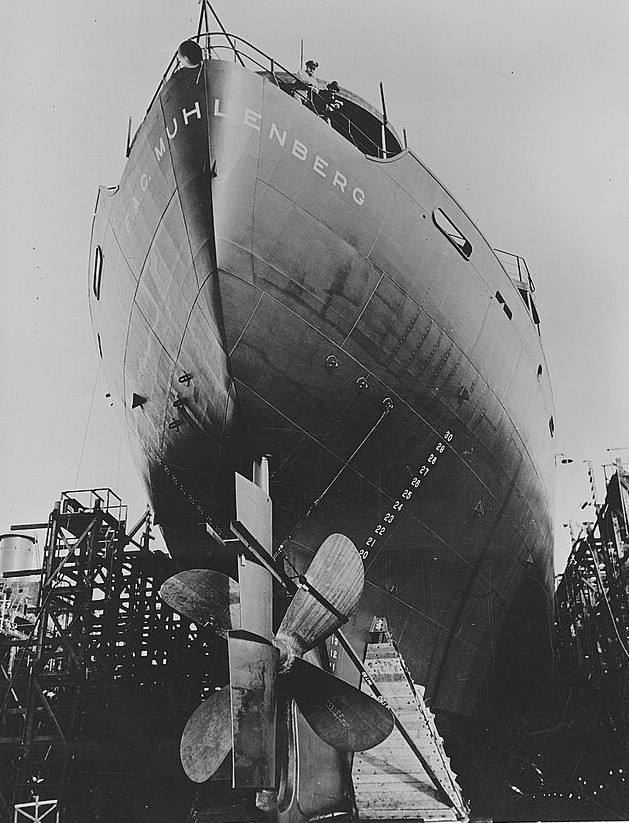
Construction of a Liberty Ship in California Shipbuilding's yard, June 1943.

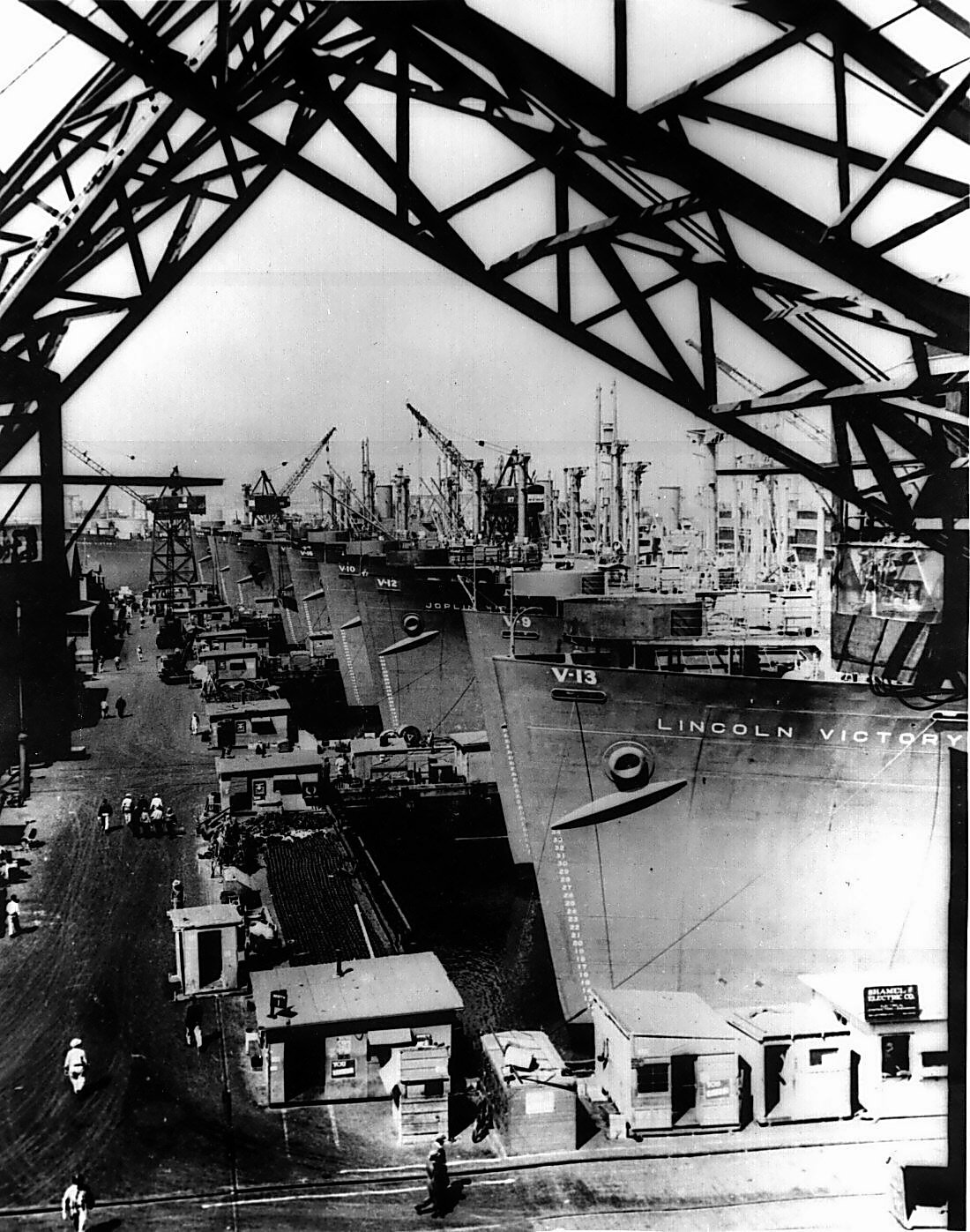
Victory Ships being fitted out at California Shipbuilding Corp. in 1944 (probably May or June).

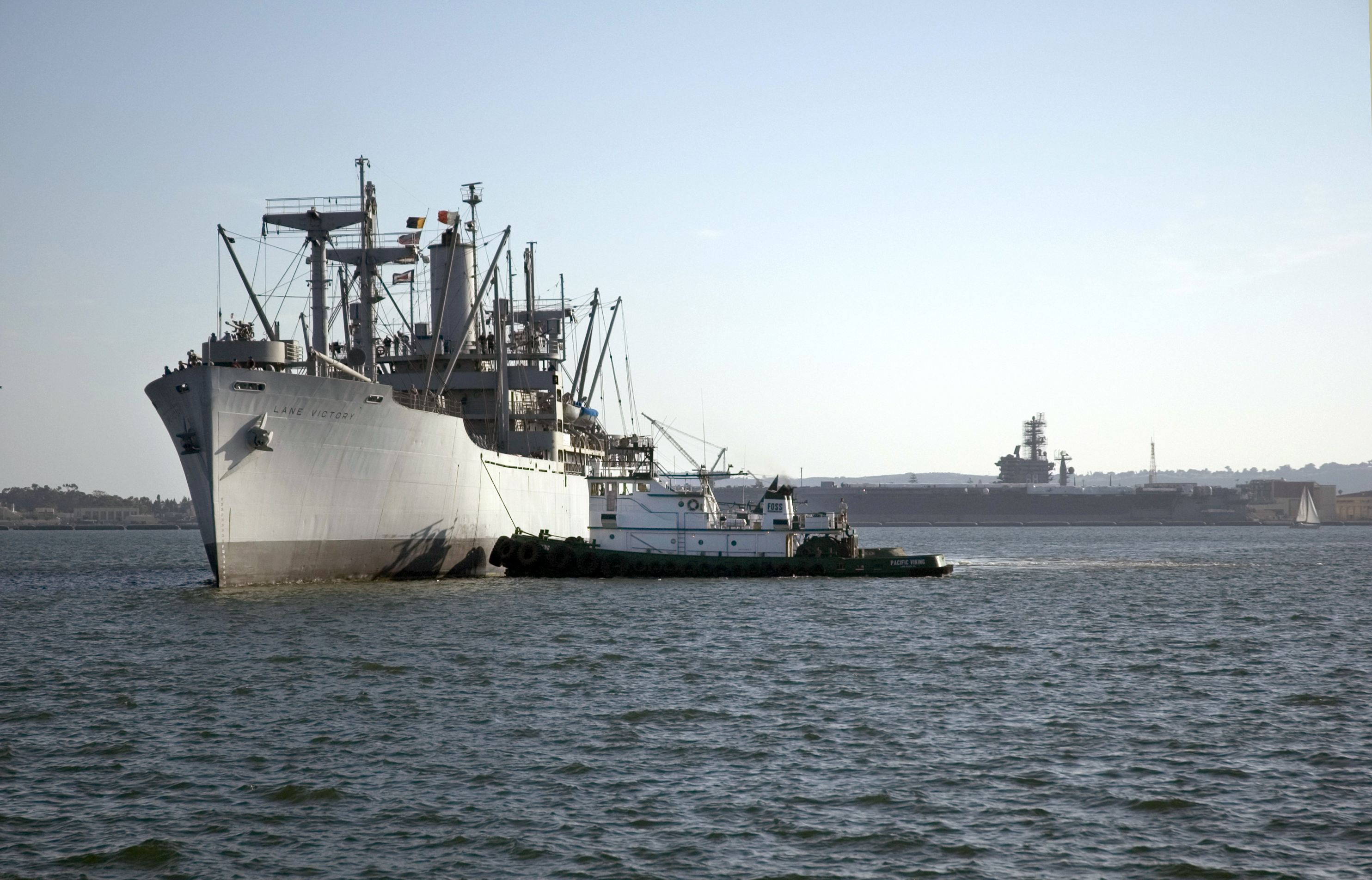
The SS Lane Victory.

== Notable ships ==
- SS Oshkosh Victory
- SS Tufts Victory
- SS U.S.S.R. Victory
- SS Luray Victory
- USS Arenac
- SS Alamo Victory
- USS St. Mary's (APA-126)
- SS Carroll Victory
- SS Gainesville Victory
- SS Joplin Victory
- USNS Dalton Victory (T-AK-256)
- USS Attala
- SS Clara Barton
- USS Botetourt
- SS Colby Victory
- SS Mexico Victory
- USS Kenton (APA-122)
- SS Sharon Victory
- USS Hendry (APA-118)
- USS Lanier (APA-125)
- USS Hinsdale (APA-120)
- USS Kittson (APA-123)
- USS Don Marquis (IX-215)
- SS Carlos Carrillo
- USS Bosque (APA-135)
- SS Leland Stanford
- USS Betelgeuse (AK-260)
- SS Edward Eggleston

== Details ==
First keels laid on slipways 1 through 14, marking the completion steps of the shipyard facilities

Way	Keel laid
1	24 May
2	24 May
3	21 Jun
4	27 Jun
5	10 Jul
6	17 Jul
7	23 Jul
8	31 Jul
9	11 Sep
10	15 Sep
11	22 Sep
12	6 Oct
13	13 Oct
14	20 Oct

Launchings
	Jan	Feb	Mar	Apr	May	Jun	Jul	Aug	Sep	Oct	Nov	Dec	Total
1941									1	1	1	2	5
1942	3	5	4	7	7	11	10	11	12	13	13	15	111
1943	15	14	16	18	20	18	16	16	7	0	8	16	164
1944	14	10	8	8	6	8	7	5	7	6	7	9	95
1945	8	7	8	8	8	6	6	5	6				62

Liberty Totals
Bethlehem Fairfield	385
Kaiser Richmond #2	348
California Shipbuilding	336
Oregon Shipbuilding	330
New England Shipbuilding	244
Todd Houston	208
10 others	863

Victory Totals
Oregon Shipbuilding	136
California Shipbuilding	131
Kaiser Richmond #2	105
Bethlehem Fairfield	94
Kaiser Richmond #1	53
Kaiser Vancouver	31

Launching of Liberty tankers, missing on shipbuildinghistory

Name	Launched	Notes
Albert J. Berres	13 Sep 43	3rd L-tanker, 34 days on ways
Richard J. Cleveland	15 Sep 43	4th L-tanker, 258th ship
Josiah G. Holland	17 Sep 43	5th tanker
Oscar F. Barret	18 Sep 43	6th/260th
James Cook	21 Sep 43	7th tanker 34 days on ways
Christopher L. Sholes	27 Sep 43	8th tanker
Orson D. Munn	30 Sep 43	9th tanker 30 days on way
Alan Seeger	5 Oct 43	10th L-tanker, 266th ship
Horace Sees	9 Oct 43	11th L-tanker

== See also ==
- Emergency Shipbuilding Program
- California during World War II
