= SS India Victory =

United States Merchant Marine ship

- A typical Victory ship

History

United States
- Name: India Victory
- Namesake: India
- Ordered: as a Type VC2-S-AP2 hull, MCV hull 527
- Builder: Permanente Metals Corporation, Richmond, California
- Laid down: 4 March 1944
- Launched: 15 May 1944
- Completed: 29 July 1944
- Identification: Official number: 245981; Call sign: WSAQ
- Fate: Ran aground in South China Sea in storm 12 July 1972

General characteristics
- Class & type: Victory ship
- Displacement: 4,480 long tons (4,550 t) (standard); 15,580 long tons (15,830 t) (full load)
- Length: 455 ft (139 m)
- Beam: 62 ft (19 m)
- Draft: 29 ft 2 in (8.89 m)
- Installed power: 2 × Babcock & Wilcox header-type boilers, 525 psi (3,620 kPa) at 750°; 6,000 shp (4,500 kW)
- Propulsion: 1 × Westinghouse turbine; double Westinghouse Main Reduction Gears; 1 × shaft
- Speed: 15.5 kn (17.8 mph; 28.7 km/h)
- Capacity: 7,800 t (7,700 long tons) DWT; 453,210 cu ft (12,833 m^{3}) (non-refrigerated)
- Armament: During World War 2; 1 × 5 in (127 mm)/38-caliber dual-purpose gun; 1 × 3 in (76 mm)/50-caliber dual-purpose gun; 8 × 20 mm (0.8 in) Oerlikon cannons anti-aircraft (AA) mounts

SS India Victory was a Victory ship built and operated as a cargo carrier and troopship in World War II. After the war the ship was used as a private cargo ship. She sank on 12 July 1972, after running aground on Pratas Reef in the South China Sea during Typhoon Susan.

== Construction ==
SS India Victory was laid down under U.S. Maritime Commission contract by Permanente Metals Corporation, Richmond, California on 4 March 1944, under the Emergency Shipbuilding program. She was launched on 15 May 1944 and was delivered to the War Shipping Administration (WSA) on 29 July 1944.

India Victory was used near the end of World War II. The ship's United States Maritime Commission designation was VC2-S-AP3, hull number P No. 1 (527), Victory #527. The Maritime Commission turned her over to a civilian contractor for operation as a troopship. Victory ships were designed to replace the earlier Liberty ships. Liberty ships were designed to be used just for World War II. Victory ships were designed to last longer and serve the US Navy after the war. The Victory ship differed from a Liberty ship in that they were: faster, longer and wider, taller, with a thinner stack set farther toward the superstructure and had a long raised forecastle.

== World War II ==
During World War II India Victory operated as a merchantman and was chartered to the Lykes Brothers Steamship Company in San Francisco California. With a civilian crew and United States Navy Armed Guard to man the ship guns. India Victory served in the Pacific Ocean in World War II as part of the Pacific War.

The India Victory was at Morotai, eastern Indonesia's Maluku Islands (Moluccas), from September 28 to October 17, 1944. While at Morotai India Victory had 37 air raid alerts and there were seven air attacks close to the ship. Using her deck guns she assisted on October 8 in downing a plane. On October 9 and 11 planes dropped bombs close to her. She also service the European theatre of war. She departed Le Havre, France on 30 September 1945 returning personnel of the 81st Tank Battalion and the 15th Infantry taking them home as part of Operation Magic Carpet. In 1946 she was loaned to the Ministry of Transport in London and operated by the Furness Withy & Company to transport English soldiers and material to England.

She was part of two convoys:

- Convoy GB.703, October 1944: Morotai - Humboldt.
- Convoy GUS.81 (April 1945: Oran - Hampton Roads.

== Post World War II ==
In 1947 she was returned to the U.S. Maritime Commission and sold to the Holland America Line and renamed the SS Arnedijk. In 1954 Holland America Line renamed here SS Arnedyk. In 1962 she was sold to Transeuro A.G., Monrovia of Liberia, and renamed SS San Marino. In 1963 she was sold to Atlantic Far East Lines of Monrovia and renamed SS Hongkong Producer (Official number: 5411668) In 1969 she was sold to Universal Marine Corp. of Monrovia. In 1971 she was sold to Universal Marine Corp. of Monrovia who rebuilt her into a 7,658 GRT container ship. and renamed her the SS Oriental Falcon (Official number: 5411668). On 12 July 1972 she ran aground on Pratas Reef in the South China Sea at 20°42′08″N 116°43′39″E in a typhoon; the ship was a total loss and was abandoned. She was on a trip from Seattle to China. The ship split into two in the storm. Two days after the wreck all the crew was rescued.

== See also ==
- List of Victory ships
- Type C1 ship
- Type C2 ship
- Type C3 ship

== Sources ==
- Sawyer, L.A. and W.H. Mitchell. Victory ships and tankers: The history of the ‘Victory’ type cargo ships and of the tankers built in the United States of America during World War II, Cornell Maritime Press, 1974, 0-87033-182-5.
- United States Maritime Commission: Victory Ships alphabetical list War II
- Victory Cargo Ships Oregon Shipyards Record Breakers Page 2
