= SS Joplin Victory =

Victory ship of the United States

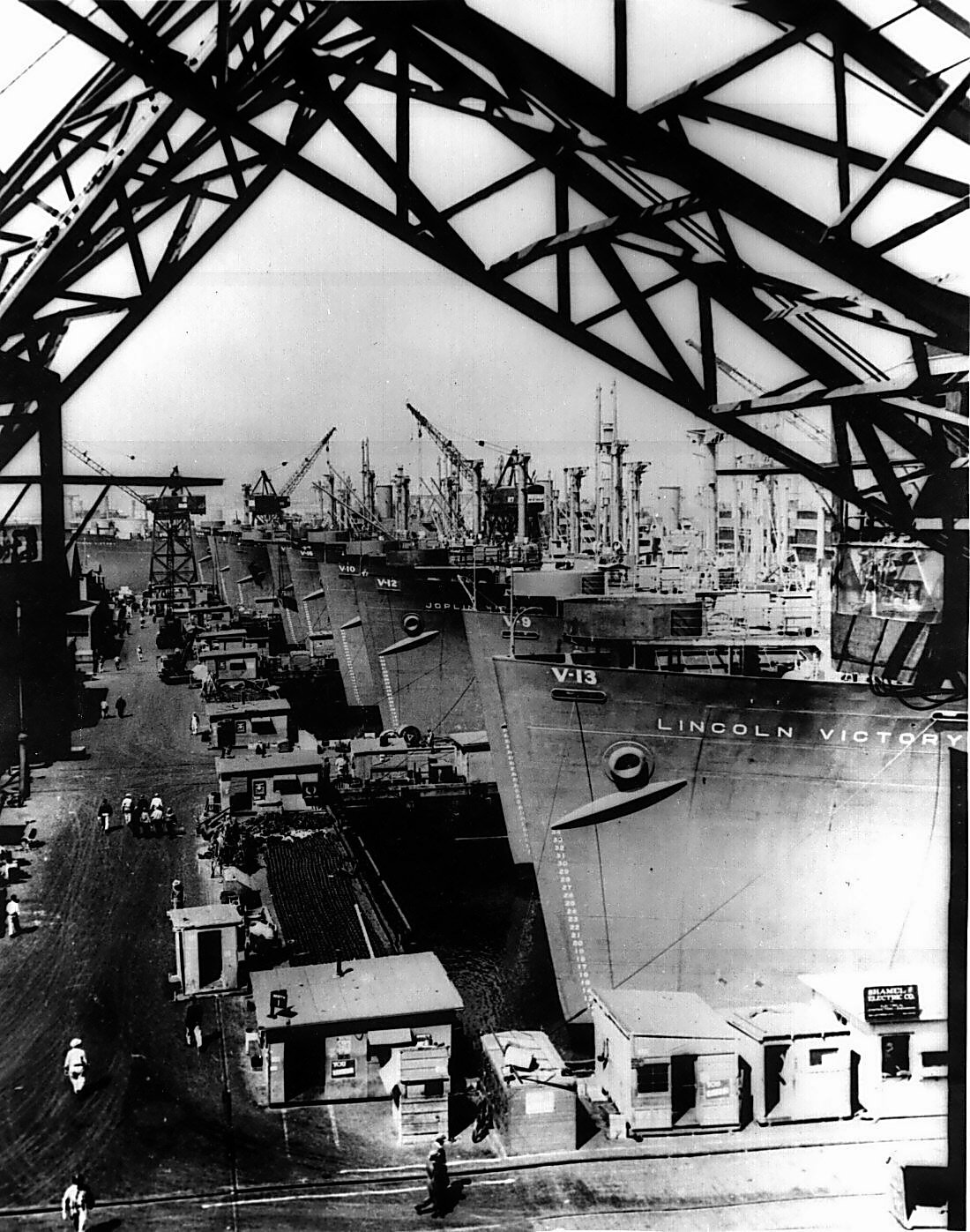
- The third ship, with V-12 on the hull, is the SS Joplin Victory.

History

United States
- Name: SS Joplin Victory
- Namesake: Joplin, Missouri
- Owner: War Shipping Administration
- Operator: Mccormick Steamship Company
- Builder: California Shipbuilding Company, Los Angeles
- Laid down: February 24, 1944
- Launched: April 25, 1944
- Completed: June 15, 1944
- Identification: IMO number: 5175185
- Fate: Scrapped in Alang, India, 1994

General characteristics
- Class & type: VC2-S-AP3 Victory ship
- Tonnage: 7612 GRT, 4,553 NRT
- Displacement: 15,200 tons
- Length: 455 ft (139 m)
- Beam: 62 ft (19 m)
- Draught: 28 ft (8.5 m)
- Installed power: 8,500 shp (6,300 kW)
- Propulsion: HP & LP turbines geared to a single 20.5-foot (6.2 m) propeller, by Westinghouse Electric & Mfg. Co., Essington
- Speed: 16.5 knots
- Boats & landing craft carried: 4 Lifeboats
- Complement: 62 Merchant Marine and 28 US Naval Armed Guards
- Armament: 1 × 5 inch (127 mm)/38 caliber gun as Victory ship; 1 × 3 inch (76 mm)/50 caliber gun; 8 × 20 mm Oerlikon

The SS Joplin Victory was the 12th Victory ship built during World War II under the Emergency Shipbuilding program. She was launched by the California Shipbuilding Company on April 25, 1944, and completed on June 15, 1944. The ship's United States Maritime Commission designation was VC2-S-AP3, hull number 12 (V-12). The 10,500-ton Victory ships were designed to replace the earlier Liberty Ships. Liberty ships were designed to be used just for World War II. Victory ships were designed to last longer and serve the US Navy after the war. The Victory ship differed from a Liberty ship in that they were: faster, longer and wider, taller, had a thinner stack set farther toward the superstructure and had a long raised forecastle.

SS Joplin Victory was christened on April 26, 1944, and launched at the yards of the California Shipbuilding Corporation. The launching of The SS Joplin Victory splashed into the water of Wilmington, Los Angeles.

== World War II ==
SS Joplin Victory was operated by Mccormick Steamship Company under charter with the Maritime Commission and War Shipping Administration. SS Joplin Victory served in the Pacific Ocean in World War II as part of the Pacific War. SS Joplin Victory Naval Armed Guard crews earned "Battle Stars" in World War II for the assault occupation of Okinawa.

== Ward incident ==
SS Joplin Victory was part of a foreign relations project between the United States and China called the Ward incident, a diplomatic incident. In 1949 she streamed in to China port city of Port of Tianjin, called Taku Bar at the time, to remove US citizens at Mukden. She steamed in with the Lakeland Victory. SS Joplin Victory was in port from Dec. 5 to 7, 1949. The two ships removed the US diplomatic staff in China. US Consul General Angus Ward and nineteen other American citizens has spent time in a Communist Chinese jail.

On February 3, 1949, she arrived in San Francisco with Shanghai refugees.

== Korean War ==
SS Joplin Victory served as merchant marine naval ship supplying goods for the Korean War. She help move the 140th Medium Tank Battalion. About 75 percent of the personnel taken to Korea for the Korean War came by the merchant marine ships. The SS Joplin Victory transported goods, mail, food and other supplies. About 90 percent of the cargo was moved by merchant marine naval to the Korean war zone. SS Joplin Victory made trips between 18 November 1950 and 23 December 1952 helping American forces engaged against Communist aggression in South Korea. On Nov. 19, 1952 she was blown by high winds and broke loose from the Oakland Estuary pier, in Oakland, California. She ran into the side of a transport ship, the Navy's SS Neshoba.

== James River ==
She was laid up at Astoria, Oregon in 1952 and later transferred to the James River in Virginia as part of the National Defense Reserve Fleet for years. In 1994 she was scrapped in Alang, India.

== See also ==
- List of Victory ships
- Liberty ship
- Type C1 ship
- Type C2 ship
- Type C3 ship

== Sources ==
- Sawyer, L.A. and W.H. Mitchell. Victory ships and tankers: The history of the ‘Victory’ type cargo ships and of the tankers built in the United States of America during World War II, Cornell Maritime Press, 1974, 0-87033-182-5.
- United States Maritime Commission:
- Victory Cargo Ships
