= List of Victory ships (N) =

This is a list of Victory ships with names beginning with N.

== Description ==
A Victory ship was a cargo ship. The cargo ships were 455 feet 3 inches (138.76 m) overall, 436 feet 6 inches (133.05 m) between perpendiculars They had a beam of 62 feet 0 inches (18.90 m), a depth of 38 feet 0 inches (11.58 m) and a draught of 28 feet 0 inches (8.53 m). They were assessed at 7,612 GRT, 4,555 NRT and 10,750 DWT.

The ships were powered by a triple expansion steam engine, driving a steam turbine via double reduction gear. This gave the ship a speed of 15.5 knots (28.7 km/h) or 16.5 knots (30.6 km/h), depending on the machinery installed.

Liberty ships had five holds. No. 1 hold was 57 feet 6 inches (17.53 m) long, with a capacity of 81,715 cubic feet (2,313.9 m^{3}), No. 2 hold was 45 feet 0 inches (13.72 m) long, with a capacity of 89,370 cubic feet (2,531 m^{3}), No. 3 hold was 78 feet 0 inches (23.77 m) long, with a capacity of 158,000 cubic feet (4,500 m^{3}), No. 4 hold was 81 feet 0 inches (24.69 m) long, with a capacity of 89,370 cubic feet (2,531 m^{3}) and No. 5 hold was 75 feet 0 inches (22.86 m) long, with a capacity of 81,575 cubic feet (2,309.9 m^{3}).

In wartime service, they carried a crew of 62, plus 28 gunners. The ships carried four lifeboats. Two were powered, with a capacity of 27 people and two were unpowered, with a capacity of 29 people.

== Nampa Victory ==
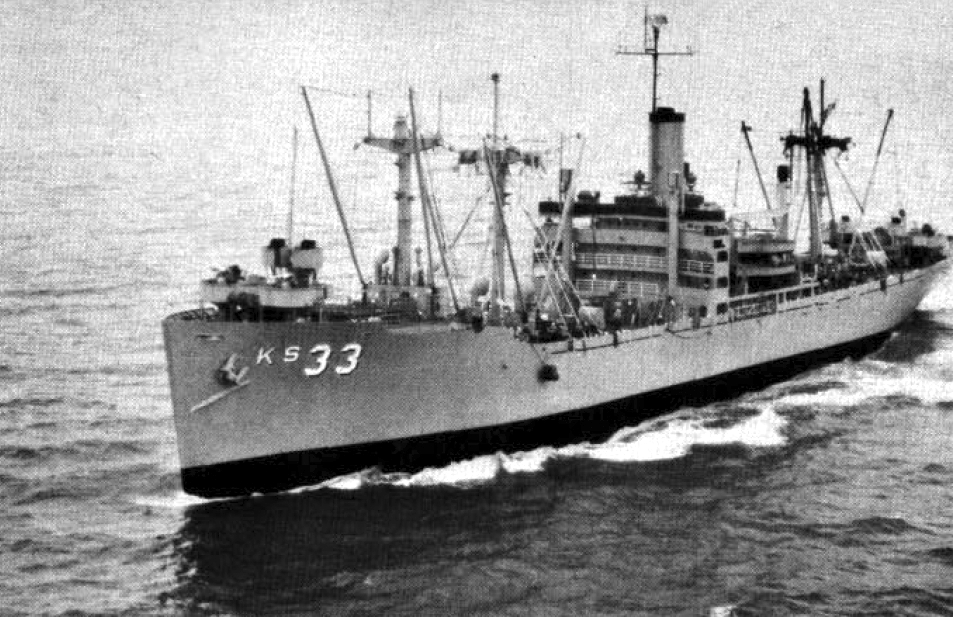
USS Antares

Nampa Victory was built by Oregon Shipbuilding Corporation, Portland, Oregon. Her keel was laid on 6 April 1944. She was launched on 19 May and delivered on 10 June. Built for the War Shipping Administration (WSA), she was operated under the management of International Freighting Corporation. Laid up at Wilmington, North Carolina in 1946. To the United States Navy in 1951 and renamed Antares. Decommissioned in 1963 and laid up in the James River. She was scrapped in the United States in 1975.

== Napa ==
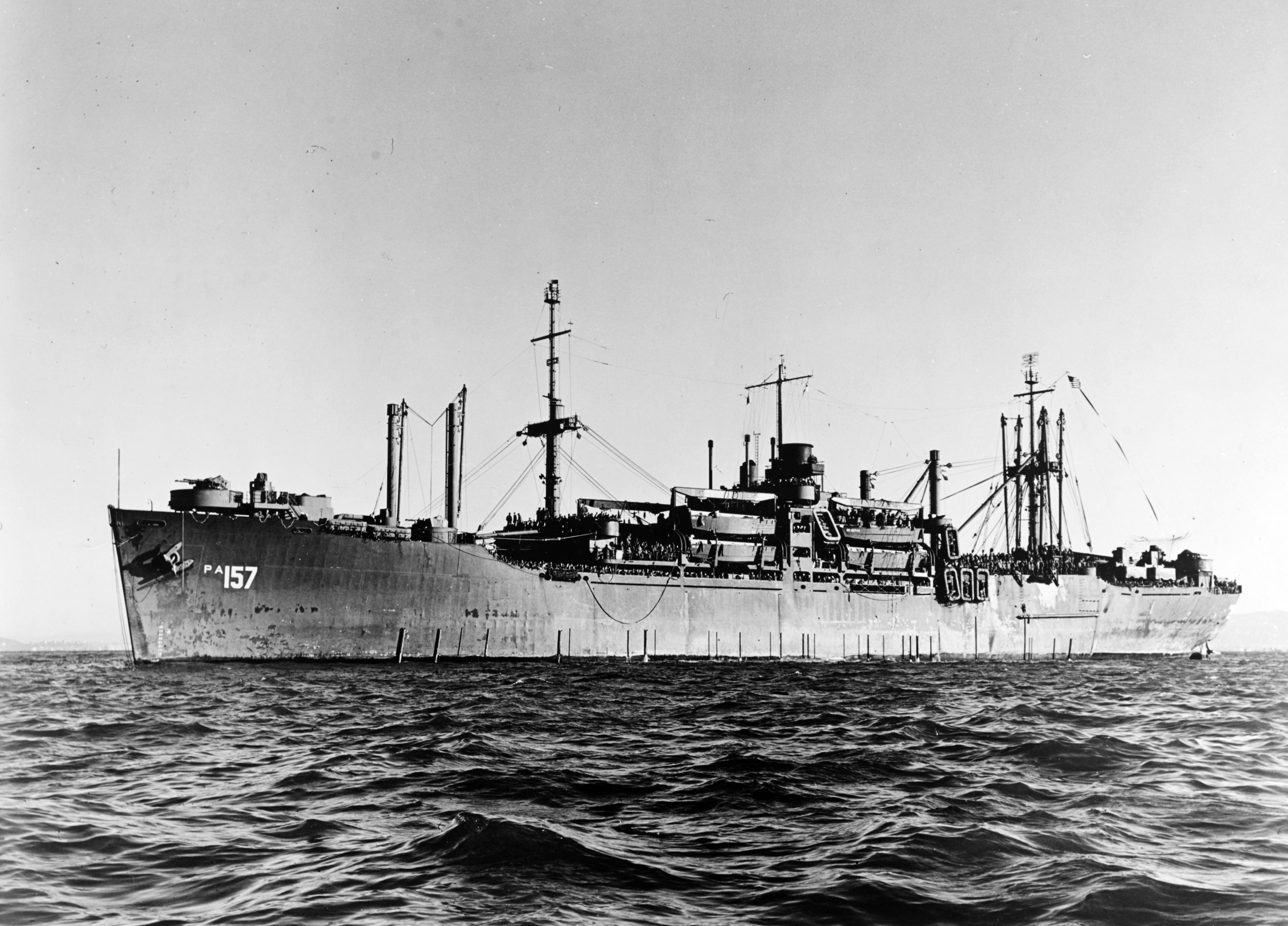
USS Napa

Napa was built by Oregon Shipbuilding Corporation. Her keel was laid on 7 June 1944. She was launched on 12 August and delivered on 1 October. Built for the United States Navy. To the United States Maritime Commission (USMC) in 1946 and laid up in the James River. To the United States Navy in 1959. Laid up in the James River in 1960. She was scrapped in 1983.

== Nashua Victory ==
Nashua Victory was built by Bethlehem Fairfield Shipyard, Baltimore, Maryland. Her keel was laid on 12 June 1945. She was launched on 6 August and delivered on 10 September. Built for the WSA, she was operated under the management of Calmar Steamship Company. Laid up in the James River in 1947. Returned to service in 1966 due to the Vietnam War. Operated under the management of Weyerhaeuser Steamship Company. Laid up in Suisun Bay in 1973. She was scrapped in Kaohsiung, Taiwan in 1984.

== Natrona ==
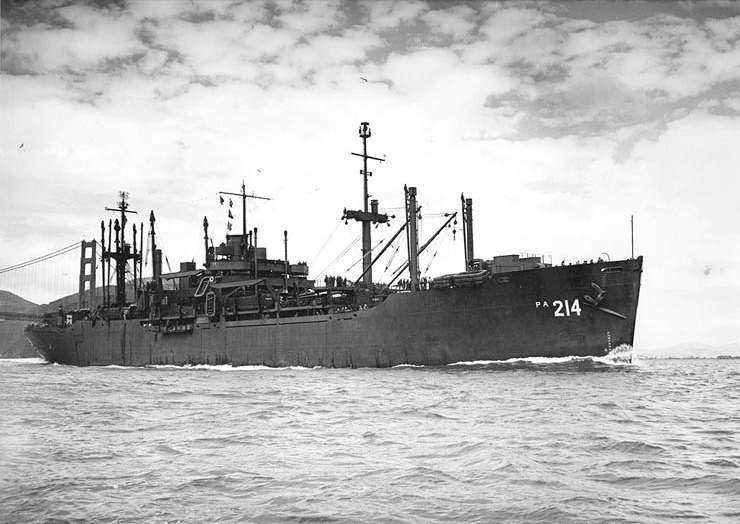
USS Natrona

Natrona was built by Permanente Metals Corporation, Richmond, California. Her keel was laid on 30 June 1944. She was launched on 27 September and delivered on 8 November. Built for the United States Navy. Decommission in 1946 and laid up in reserve at Stockton, California. To the United States Maritime Administration in 1959. Laid up in Suisun Bay. She was scrapped in the United States in 1975.

== Navajo Victory ==
Navajo Victory was built by California Shipbuilding Corporation, Terminal Island, Los Angeles, California. Her keel was laid on 5 March 1944. She was launched on 2 May and delivered on 30 June. Built for the WSA, she was operated under the management of Luckenbach Steamship Co., Inc. Reported laid up at Astoria, Oregon in 1950, although on 16 April 1953 she rescued the 40 crew of the British steamship Menestheus, which had caught fire in the Pacific Ocean. Navajo Victoy took Menestheus in tow for San Diego, California. Returned to service in 1966 due to the Vietnam War. Operated under the management of American Mail Line. Laid up in Suisun Bay in 1973. She was scrapped at Kaohsiung in 1985.

== Navarro ==
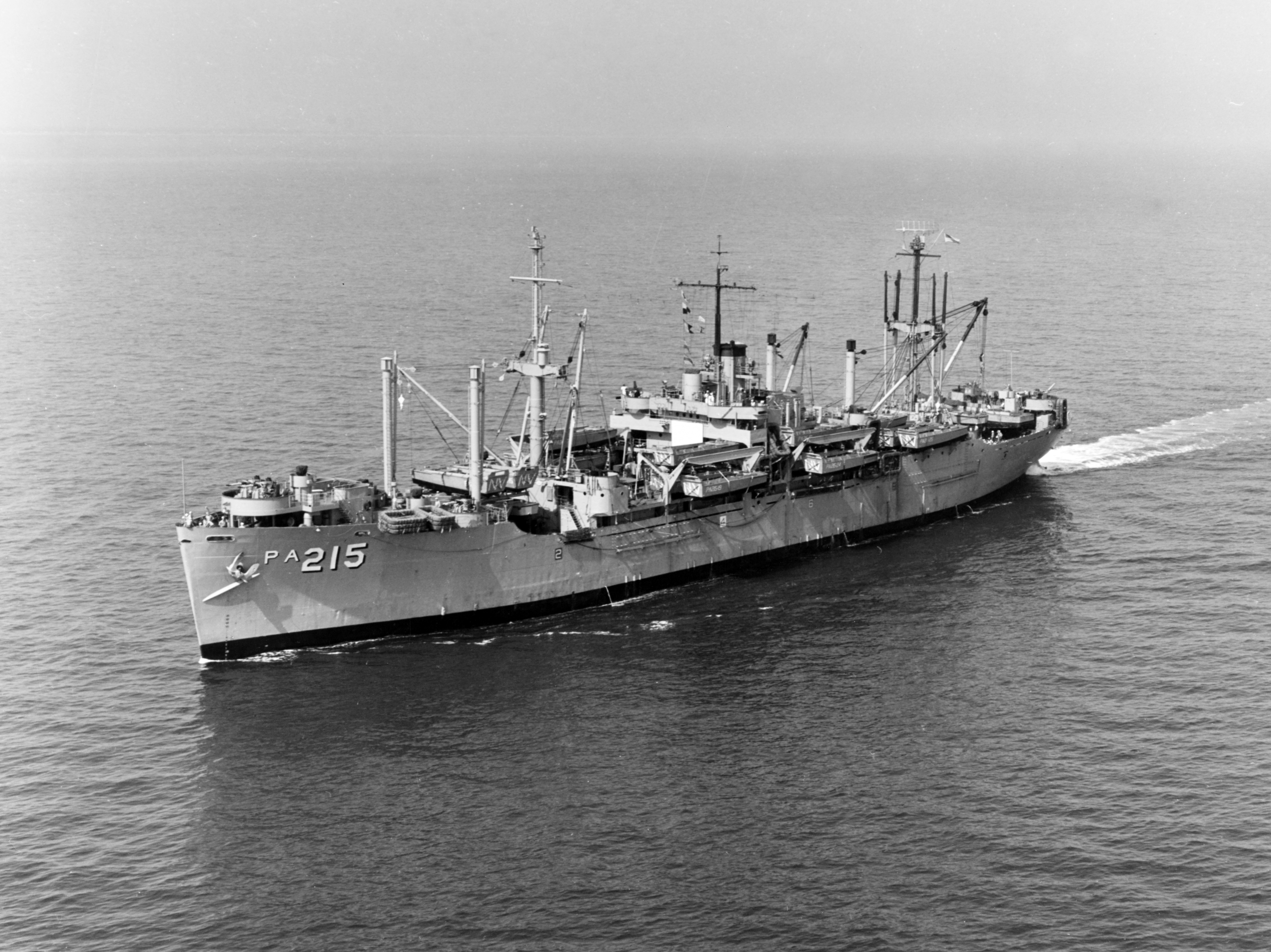
USS Navarro

Navarro was built by Permanente Metals Corporation. Her keel was laid on 27 June 1944. She was launched on 3 October and delivered on 15 November. Built for the United States Navy. Decommissioned in 1946 and laid up in reserve at Stockton. Recommissioned in 1950 due to the Korean War. Stricken in 1969 and laid up in Suisun Bay. She was scrapped in 1982.

== Neshoba ==
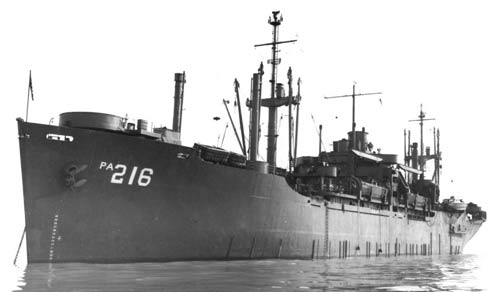
USS Neshoba

Neshoba was built by Permanente Metals Corporation. Her keel was laid on 3 July 1944. She was launched on 7 October and delivered on 16 November. Built for the United States Navy. Decommissioned in 1946 and laid up in reserve at Stockton. To the United States Maritime Administration in 1958 and laid up in Suisun Bay. She was scrapped in the United States in 1975.

== Netherlands Victory ==
Netherlands Victory was built by Oregon Shipbuilding Corporation. Her keel was laid on 1 January 1944. She was launched on 6 March and delivered on 10 April. Built for the WSA, she was operated under the management of McCormick Steamship Company. Sold in 1949 to States Marine Corp., Wilmington, Delaware and renamed Pelican State. To States Marine Lines Inc., Wilmington, Delaware in 1960. Sold in 1969 to Oswego Shipping Inc., Wilmington, Delaware and renamed Silver Robin. Sold in 1970 to West Pacific Steamship Co., Panama and renamed Pacrobin. She was scrapped at Kaohsiung in April 1971.

== New Bern Victory ==
New Bern Victory was a troop transport built by Bethlehem Fairfield Shipyard. Her keel was laid on 15 January 1945. She was launched on 8 March and delivered on 31 March. Built for the WSA, she was operated under the management of Prudential Steamship Corporation. Sold in 1947 to South African Marine Corporation, Cape Town, Union of South Africa and renamed Constantia. Converted to a cargo liner. Renamed South African Vanguard in 1961, then S. A. Vanguard in 1966. Sold in 1969 to Fairwind Maritime Corp., Panama and renamed Isabena. She capsized and sank off Karachi, Pakistan on 4 July 1972 after her cargo shifted due to not using lightening boards. The wreck was struck by the Pakistani cargo ship Abasin on 24 July. Abasin was beached.

== New Kent ==
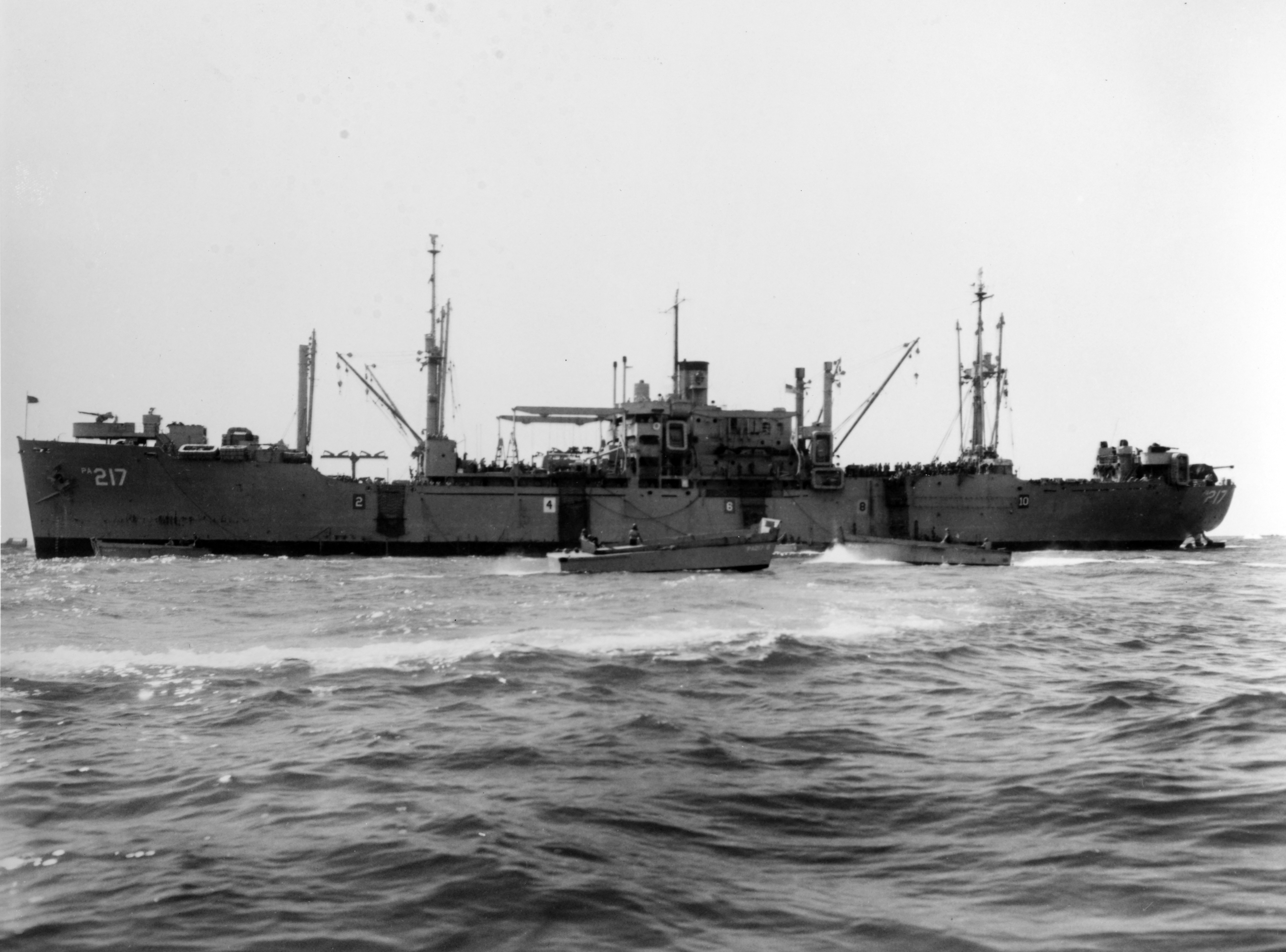
USS New Kent

New Kent was built by Permanente Metals Corporation. Her keel was laid on 11 July 1944. She was launched on 12 October and delivered on 22 November. Built for the United States Navy. She was decommissioned in 1949 and laid up at Orange, Texas. Recommissioned in 1951 due to the Korean War. Decommissioned in 1954 and laid up at Orange. To the United States Maritime Administration in 1959. Laid up a Mobile, Alabama. She was sold in October 1971 for scrapping at Panama City, Florida.

== New Rochelle Victory ==
New Rochelle Victory was built by Bethlehem Fairfield Shipyard. Her keel was laid on 7 July 1945. She was launched on 5 September and delivered on 2 October. Built for the WSA, she was operated under the management of West India Steamship Company. Laid up at Wilmington, North Carolina in 1948. She was scrapped at Kaohsiung in July 1972.

== New World Victory ==
New World Victory was built by Permanente Metals Corporation. Her keel was laid on 18 April 1945. She was launched on 30 May and delivered on 23 June. Built for the WSA, she was operated under the management of Sudden & Christenson. Laid up at Olympia in 1950. She was scrapped at Portland, Oregon in April 1972.

== New Zealand Victory ==
New Zealand Victory was built by California Shipbuilding Corporation. Her keel was laid on 25 January 1944. She was launched on 20 March and delivered on 13 May. Built for the WSA, she was operated under the management of Waterman Steamship Corporation. Laid up in Suisun Bay in 1948. Later transferred to Astoria. Sold in 1965 to Charles Kurz & Co., Wilmington, Delaware. Operated under the management of Keystone Shipping Company. Sold in 1967 to Halcyon Steamship Company, Wilmington, Delaware and renamed Halcyon Tiger. Sold in 1971 to Universal Mariners S.A., Panama and renamed Palona. She was scrapped in Taiwan in 1973.

== Newberry ==
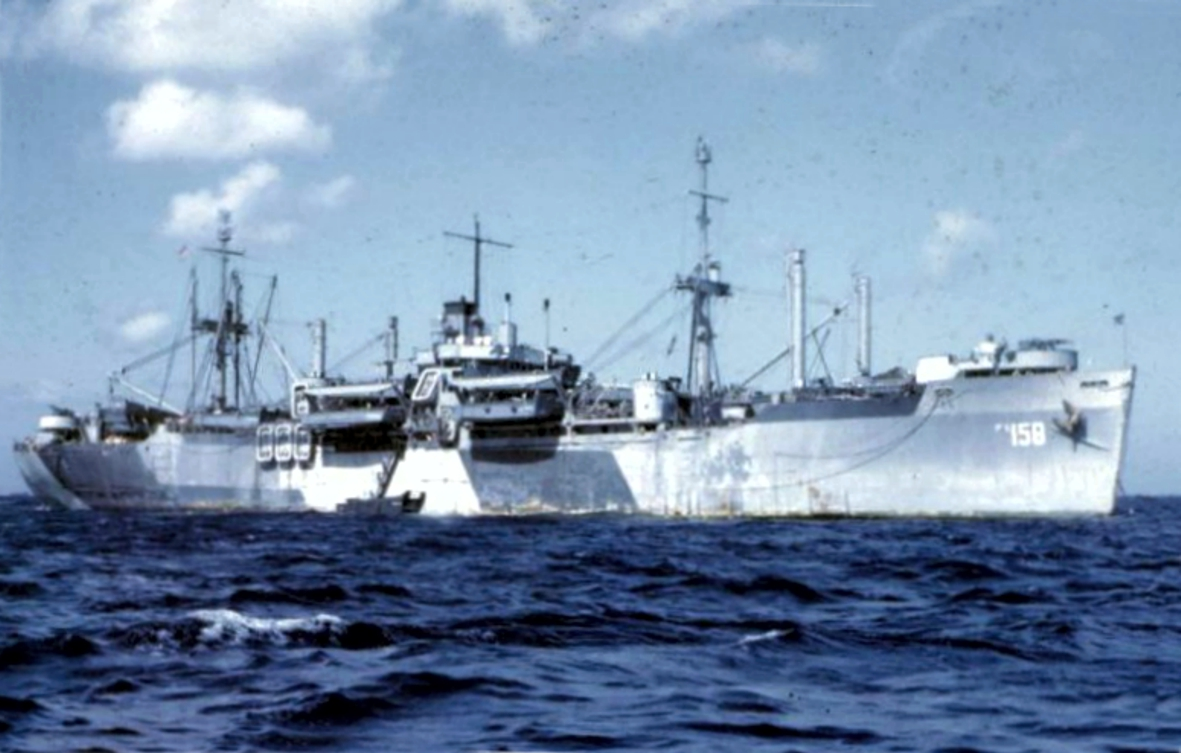
USS Newberry

Newberry was built by Oregon Shipbuilding Corporation. Her keel was laid on 10 June 1944. She was launched on 24 August and delivered on 6 October. Built for the United States Navy. To the USMC in 1946. Laid up in the James River. She was scrapped in 1983.

== Newberry Victory ==
Newberry Victory was built by Permanente Metals Corporation. Her keel was laid on 16 June 1945. She was launched on 19 July and delivered on 13 September. Built for the WSA, she was operated under the management of Parry Navigation Company. Laid up at Beaumont in 1949. Sold in 1950 to Seatrade Corp., Delaware, New York. Sold in 1952 to Prudential Steamship Corporation, New York. To Prudential Lines Inc., New York in 1962. To the United States Department of Commerce in 1968. Leased back to Prudential Lines Inc. Laid up in the James River in 1971. She was scrapped at Brownsville, Texas in 1974.

== Newcastle Victory ==
Newcastle Victory was built by Permanente Metals Corporation. Her keel was laid on 21 August 1944. She was launched on 17 October and delivered on 23 November. Built for the United States Navy. To the USMC in 1946. Laid up at Astoria. Leased to United Fruit Company in 1955. Laid up in the James River in 1956. She was scrapped at Alang, India in 1992.

== Niagara Victory ==
Niagara Victory was built by California Shipbuilding Corporation. Her keel was laid on 27 March 1945. She was launched on 19 May and delivered on 15 June. Built for the WSA, she was operated under the management of General Steamship Company. Laid up in the Hudson River in 1948. Sold in 1950 to Atlantic Ocean Transport Corp., New York and renamed Ocean Victory. Sold i 1952 to Stockard Steamship Company, New York. Sold in 1962 to Defender Shipping Co., Wilmington, Delaware and renamed Smith Defender. Renamed U.S. Defender in 1965. Sold in 1967 to AEC Shipping Corp., Wilmington, Delaware. She was damaged by Viet Cong gunfire at Da Nang, Vietnam on 17 November 1968. Temporarily repaired, she was scrapped at Hong Kong in March 1970.

== Niantic Victory ==
Niantic Victory was built by Oregon Shipbuilding Corporation. Her keel was laid on 12 February 1944. She was launched on 25 April and delivered on 18 May. Built for the WSA, she was operated under the management of American-Hawaiian Steamship Company. Laid up at Wilmington, North Carolina in 1948. Later transferred to Suisun Bay. To the United States Navy in 1960, renamed Watertown. Operated by the Military Sea Transportation Service. Laid up in Suisun Bay in 1972. She was scrapped at Pusan, South Korea in 1974.

== Nicaragua Victory ==
Nicaragua Victory was built by Permanente Metals Corporation. Her keel was laid on 21 August 1944. She was launched on 17 October and delivered on 23 November. Built for the WSA, she was operated under the management of Isthmian Steamship Corp. Sold in 1946 to Compania Argentina de Navigation Dodero, Buenos Aires, Argentina and renamed Fletero. Sold in 1949 to Flota Argentina de Navigation de Ultramar, Buenos Aires. She ran aground at Tampico, Mexico on 27 December 1957. Sold in 1961 to Empresa Lineas Maritimas Argentinas, Buenos Aires. She was scrapped in Argentina in 1979.

== Noble ==
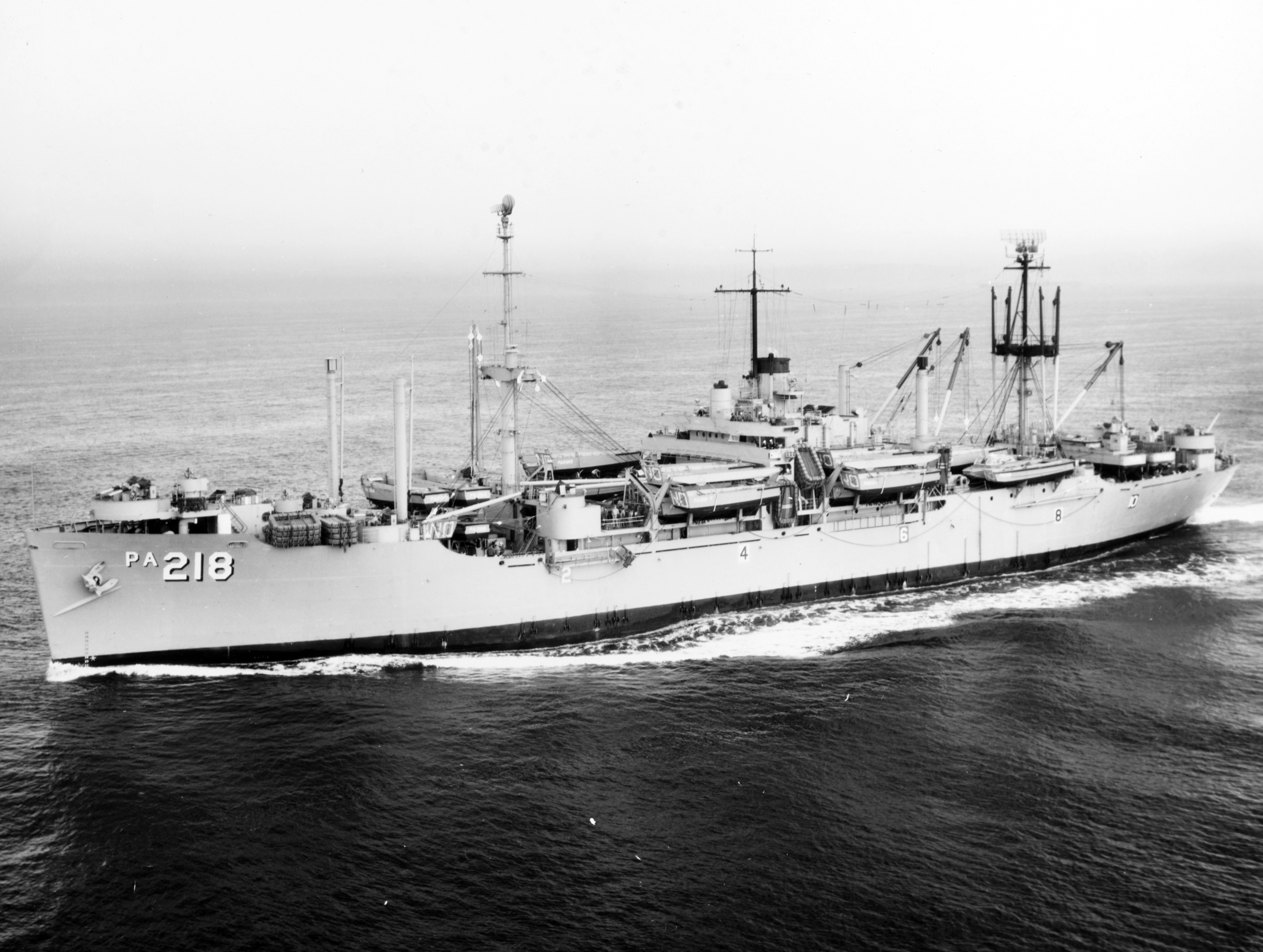
USS Noble

Noble was built by Permanente Metals Corporation. Her keel was laid on 20 July 1944. She was launched on 18 October and delivered on 27 November. Built for the United States Navy. To the Spanish Navy in 1964 and renamed Aragon. She was scrapped in 1987.

== Northeastern Victory ==
Northeastern Victory was built by Permanente Metals Corporation. Her keel was laid on 28 March 1945. She was launched on 7 May and delivered on 30 June. Built for the WSA, she was operated under the management of American-Hawaiian Steamship Company. She ran aground on the Goodwin Sands, in the English Channel on 24 December 1945 whilst on a voyage from Galveston, Texas to Antwerp, Belgium. She broke in two and was a total loss.

== North Platte Victory ==
North Platte Victory was built by California Shipbuilding Corporation. Her keel was laid on 1 June 1945. She was launched on 3 August and delivered on 5 September. Built for the WSA, she was operated under the management of Black Diamond Steamship Company. Laid up at Mobile in 1948. Returned to service in 1966 due to the Vietnam War. Operated under the management of American Mail Line. Laid up in Suisun Bay in 1973. She was scrapped in Kaohsiung in 1984.

== Northwestern Victory ==
Northwestern Victory was built by Oregon Shipbuilding Corporation. Her keel was laid on 19 January 1945. She was launched on 2 March and delivered on 2 April. Built for the WSA, she was operated under the management of Northland Transportation Company. Sold in 1949 to Victory Carriers Inc., New York. She was scrapped at Kaohsiung in June 1971.

== Norwalk Victory ==
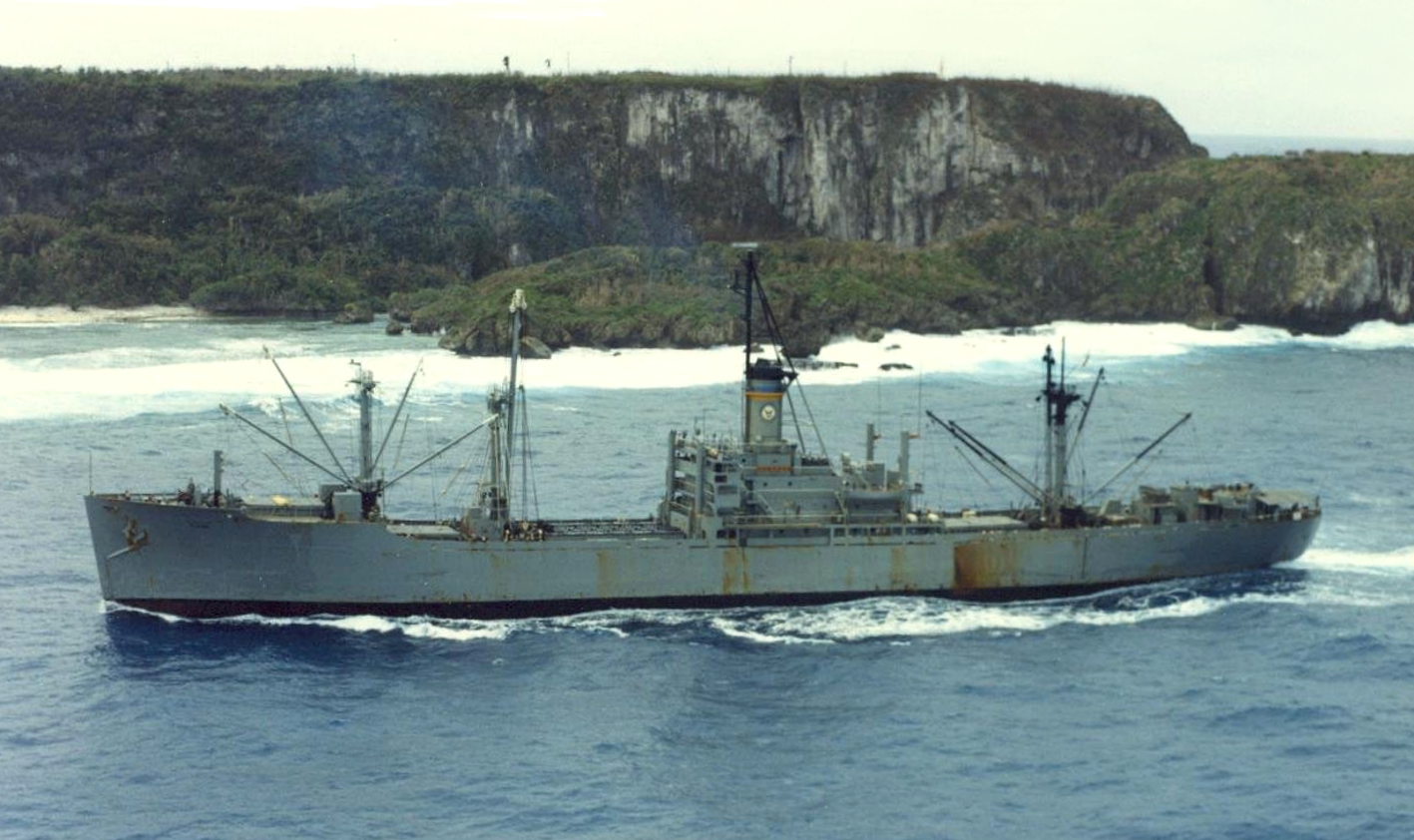
USNS Norwalk

Norwalk Victory was built by Oregon Shipbuilding Corporation. Her keel was laid on 19 May 1945. She was launched on 10 July and delivered on 7 August. Built for the WSA, she was operated under the management of Waterman Steamship Corporation. She collided with the British cargo ship Merganser in the Scheldt on 28 April 1947. Merganser sank. She was later raised, repaired and returned to service. Laid up at Beaumont in 1948. Returned to service in 1950 due to the Korean War. Laid up in the James River in 1960. To the United States Navy in 1963 and renamed Norwalk. Converted for naval use by Boland Machinery & Manufacturing Co., New Orleans, Louisiana. To the USMC in 1979, laid up in the James River. She was scrapped in 1994.

== Norway Victory ==
Norway Victory was built by Oregon Shipbuilding Corporation. Her keel was laid on 17 December 1943. She was launched on 12 February 1944 and delivered on 31 March. Built for the WSA, she was operated under the management of American Mail Line. Laid up in Suisun Bay in 1946. Sold in 1947 to India Steamship Co., Calcutta, India and renamed Indian Trader. Sold in 1971 to Pent-Ocean Steamships Ltd., Bombay, India and renamed Samudra Dhan. She was scrapped in Bombay in 1977.

== Norwich Victory ==
Norwich Victory was built by California Shipbuilding Corporation. Her keel was laid on 29 December 1944. She was launched on 24 February 1945 and delivered on 22 March. Built for the WSA, she was operated under the management of De La Rama Steamship Company, Inc. Laid up in 1950. Returned to service in 1969 due to the Vietnam War. She ran aground at Da Nang in October 1969 and was severely damaged. She was refloated and towed to Yokosuka, Japan. Sold by auction in December 1969, she was scrapped at Hiroshima, Japan in January 1970.

== Notre Dame Victory ==
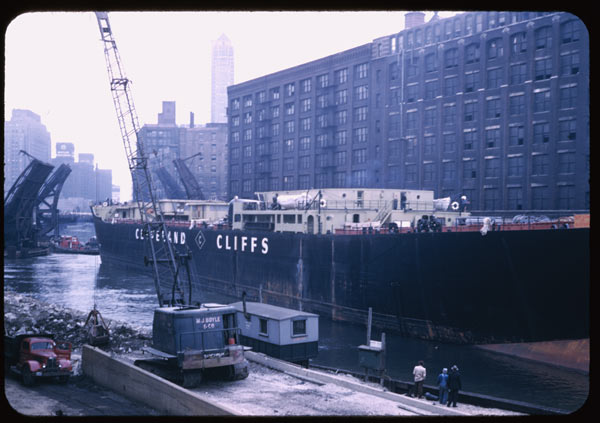
Cliffs Victory

Notre Dame Victory was built by Oregon Shipbuilding Corporation. Her keel was laid on 26 January 1945. She was launched on 9 March and delivered on 6 April. Built for the WSA, she was operated under the management of Interocean Steamship Company. Laid up in the James River in 1948. Sold in 1950 to Cleveland Cliffs Steamship Company, Wilmington, Delaware. Lengthened and converted to a bulk carrier at Baltimore. Now 620 feet (190 m) long and 14,944 DWT. Renamed Cliffs Victory. Lengthened by 90 feet (27 m) by American Ship Building Company, Chicago, Illinois in 1957. Now 18,175 DWT. Laid up at Chicago in 1981. Sold in 1985 to Hai International Inc., Panama and renamed Savic. She was scrapped at Masan, South Korea in 1987.

== N. Y. U. Victory ==
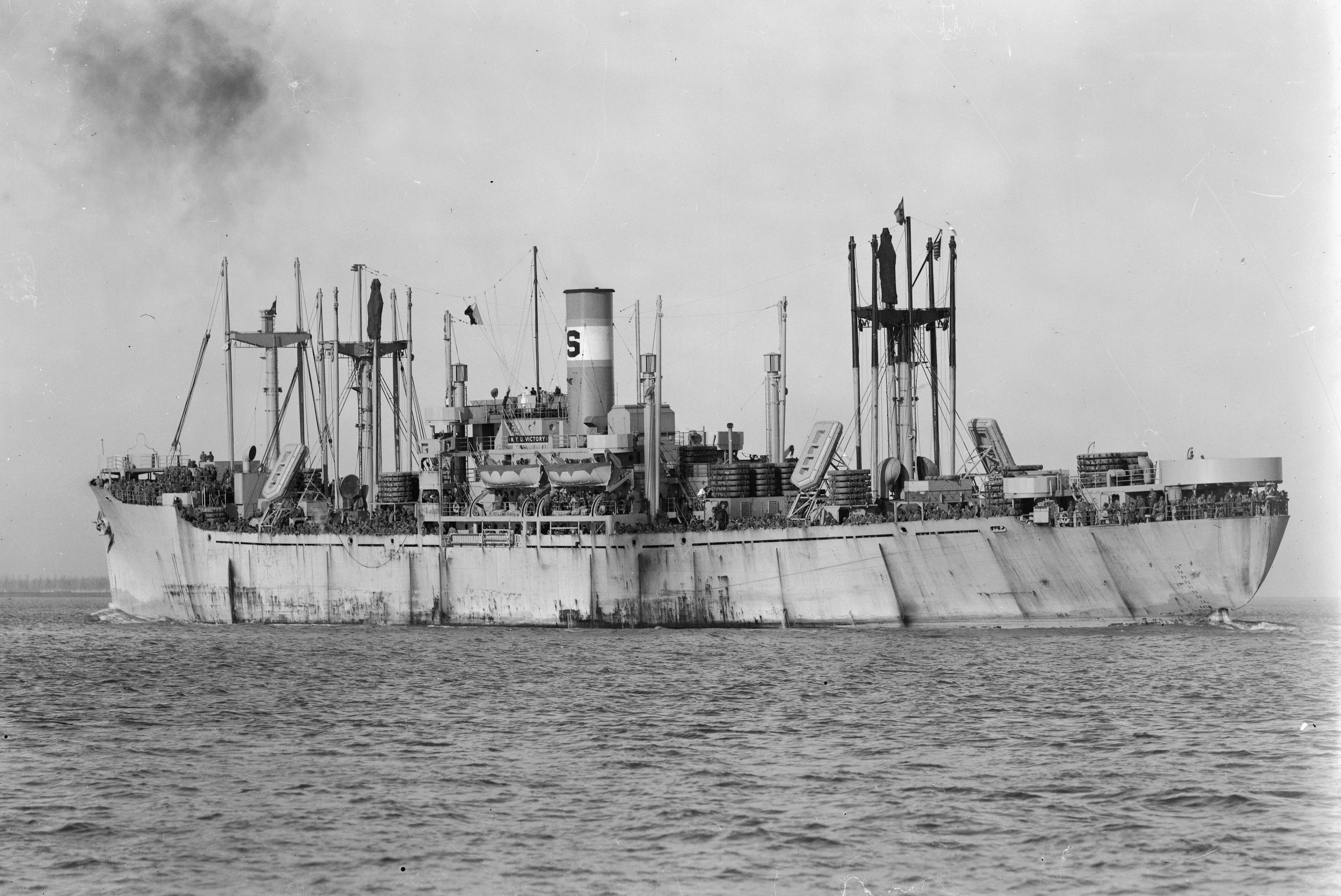
N. Y. U. Victory

N. Y. U. Victory was built by Bethlehem Fairfield Shipyard. Her keel was laid on 26 March 1945. She was launched on 16 May and delivered on 12 June. Built for the WSA, she was operated under the management of Shephard Steamship Co. Laid up in the James River in 1946. Sold in 1947 to Compania Argentina de Navigation Dodero, Buenos Aires and renamed Cordoba. Sold in 1949 to Flota Argentina de Navigation de Ultramar, Buenos Aires. On 11 August 1951, she rescued some of the passengers of the Brazilian ship Santos, which had run aground off Cabo Frio, Brazil. Rebuilt as a passenger ship in 1955. Sold in 1961 to Empresa Lineas Maritimas Argentinas, Buenos Aires. She was scrapped at Campana, Argentina in 1972.
