= Zeeland (disambiguation) =

Zeeland is a province of the Netherlands.

Zeeland may also refer to:

- Zeeland (album), a 1997 album by German band La! Neu?
- Zeeland, Gelderland, a hamlet in Berg en Dal in the Netherlands
- Zeeland, Michigan, a city in the United States
- Zeeland, North Brabant, a village in the Netherlands
- Zeeland, North Dakota, a city in the United States
- County of Zeeland, a historical county in the Netherlands
- HNLMS Zeeland, several Dutch navy ships
- SS Zeeland, a list of ocean liners

== See also ==
- New Zealand (disambiguation)
- Sealand (disambiguation)
- Seeland (disambiguation)
- Zealand (disambiguation)
- Zeelandia (disambiguation)
