= New Zealand (disambiguation) =

New Zealand is a country in the southwestern Pacific Ocean.

New Zealand may also refer to:

== Places ==
- The Realm of New Zealand, comprising Cook Islands, New Zealand, Niue, Tokelau and Ross Dependency
  - The Dominion of New Zealand, the former name of the Realm of New Zealand
- FELDA New Zealand, Pahang, Malaysia
- New Zealand, Buckinghamshire, England
- New Zealand, Derby, a suburb of Derby, England
- New Zealand, Wiltshire, England
- Essequibo (colony), a former Dutch and British colony on modern Guyana's Essequibo River, originally known as Nova Zeelandia ("New Zeeland")
- The English translation of the short-lived Danish colony of Ny Sjælland ("New Zealand") on the island of Nancowry in the Indian Ocean

== Ships ==
- New Zealand, a sailing ship chartered by the New Zealand Company in 1842
- HMS New Zealand (1904), a British battleship later renamed Zealandia
- HMS New Zealand (1911), a British battlecruiser
- SS New Zealand Victory (1944), an American merchant marine naval cargo ship

== Other ==
- 45570 New Zealand, a British LMS Jubilee Class locomotive
- The NewZealand Story, a 1988 arcade game
- New Zealand, codename for the Radeon HD 7990 video card, part of the Radeon HD 7000 series

== See also ==
- Zealand (disambiguation)
- Lew Zealand from The Muppets
