= Sealand (disambiguation) =

The Principality of Sealand (declared 1967) is an unrecognized micronation off the coast of Suffolk, England.

Sealand may also refer to:

== Places ==
- Sealand, Flintshire (established 1937), a community in Wales
- MOD Sealand, a British military station, formerly RAF Sealand
- Sealand, Denmark, more commonly spelled "Zealand"
- Zeeland, a province of the Netherlands
- The Seven Sealands, jurisdictional regions of medieval Frisia

== Transportation ==
- Sealand Helicopters (1977–1988), a Canadian transportation company
- SeaLand (1956–2023), a division of the Maersk Group, an intra-regional container shipping company
- Short Sealand (c. 1950), an amphibious aircraft

== Other uses ==
- Sealand national football team (founded 2003), the association football team that represents the Principality of Sealand
- Sealand of the Pacific (1969–1992), a former aquarium in British Columbia, Canada
- "Sealand", a song by Orchestral Manoeuvres in the Dark from Architecture & Morality (1981)
- First Sealand dynasty (c. 1732–1475 BC), an enigmatic series of kings in the Bronze Age

== See also ==
- Seeland (disambiguation)
- Zealand (disambiguation)
- Zeeland (disambiguation)
- Marineland (disambiguation)
- Waterland (disambiguation)
- Sealant
