= Zeelandia =

Zeelandia may refer to:

- 1336 Zeelandia, a main-belt asteroid
- Fort Zeelandia (Guyana), a historical fort in Guyana
- Fort Zeelandia (Paramaribo), a historical fort in Suriname
- Fort Zeelandia (Taiwan) or Fort Anping, a historical fort in Taiwan
- USS Zeelandia (Id. No. 2507), a U.S. Navy troopship
- Zeelandia, Guyana, a village in Guyana

== See also ==
- Zealandia (disambiguation)
- Zeeland (disambiguation)
