= Zealand (disambiguation) =

Zealand is an island in Denmark.

Zealand may also refer to:

- Zeeland, a province in the Netherlands, formerly anglicised as Zealand
- Zealand, New Brunswick, Canada
- Mount Zealand, in the White Mountains of New Hampshire, United States
  - Zealand Notch, an adjacent mountain pass
    - Zealand River, which flows North out of the notch
    - Zealand, a 19th century logging community in Zealand
- Region Zealand, a Danish administrative region

== See also ==
- New Zealand (disambiguation)
- Sealand (disambiguation)
- Seeland (disambiguation)
- Zealandia (disambiguation)
- Zeeland (disambiguation)
