= Zealandia (disambiguation) =

Zealandia is a nearly submerged continental mass, of which New Zealand comprises the vast majority of the above-water part.

Zealandia may also refer to:

== Places ==
- Zealandia Bank, a submarine volcano in the Marianas archipelago
- Zealandia, Saskatchewan, Canada
- Zealandia (wildlife sanctuary), Wellington, New Zealand

== Ships ==
- HMS New Zealand (1904), a British Royal Navy battleship renamed HMS Zealandia in 1911
- SS Zealandia (1875), an American sail-steamer wrecked off Southport, England in 1917
- SS Zealandia (1910), an Australian cargo and passenger ship that served as a troopship in both World War I and World War II
- ST Zealandia, a British tugboat

== Other uses ==
- Zealandia (newspaper), a New Zealand Catholic newspaper published weekly from 1934 to 1989
- Zealandia (personification), a female personification of New Zealand
- Zealandia (plant), a genus of ferns in the family Polypodiaceae
- Zealandia (Asheville, North Carolina), a mansion on the National Register of Historic Places in the United States

== See also ==
- Zeelandia (disambiguation)
- Zealand (disambiguation)
