= Seeland =

Seeland may refer to:

== Places ==
- Seeland, Germany, a municipality in the Salzlandkreis district, in Saxony-Anhalt, Germany
- Seeland (Switzerland) (Drei-Seen-Land), a region on the Swiss Plateau, Switzerland
- Seeland Region (Verwaltungsregion Seeland), an administrative region in Switzerland
  - Seeland (administrative district), part of the Seeland administrative region, Switzerland
- Seeland, Carinthia, now known as Jezersko, Slovenia

== Other ==
- Seeland-II-C, a Scandinavian C-bracteate
- Seeland Records, an independent record label created by Negativland in the 1980s
- "Seeland", a song from the album Neu! '75 by the German band Neu!

== See also ==
- Sealand (disambiguation)
- Zealand (disambiguation)
- Zeeland (disambiguation)
