= USS Neshoba =

1944 Haskell-class attack transport

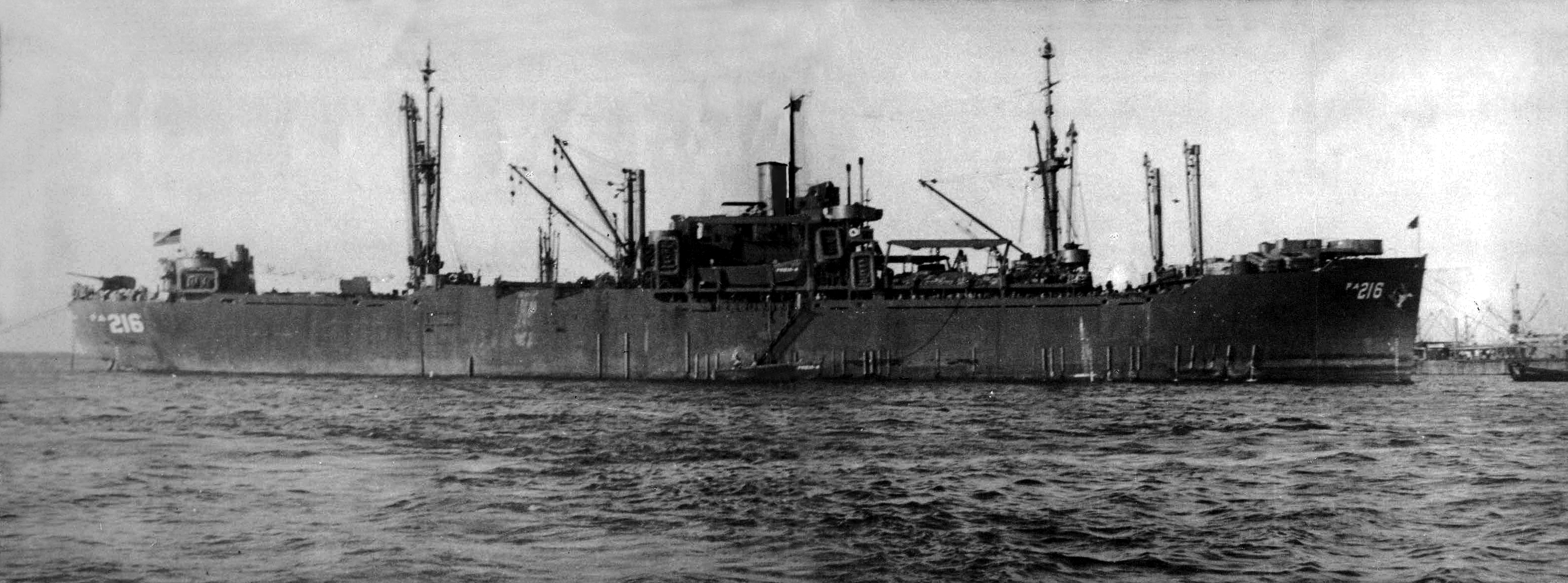
- Neshoba (APA-216), circa in early 1946

History

United States
- Name: Neshoba
- Namesake: Neshoba County, Mississippi
- Ordered: as a Type VC2-S-AP5 hull, MCE hull 564
- Builder: Permanente Metals Corporation, Richmond, California
- Yard number: 564
- Laid down: 3 July 1944
- Launched: 7 October 1944
- Commissioned: 16 November 1944
- Decommissioned: 4 December 1946
- Stricken: 1 October 1958
- Identification: Hull symbol: APA-216; Code letters: NPQK
- Honors and awards: 1 × battle star for World War II service
- Fate: Sold for scrap, 5 March 1975, delivered, 26 March 1975

General characteristics
- Class & type: Haskell-class attack transport
- Type: Type VC2-S-AP5
- Displacement: 6,873 long tons (6,983 t) (light load); 14,837 long tons (15,075 t) (full load)
- Length: 455 ft (139 m)
- Beam: 62 ft (19 m)
- Draft: 24 ft (7.3 m)
- Installed power: 2 × Babcock & Wilcox header-type boilers, 465 psi (3,210 kPa) 750 °F (399 °C); 8,500 shp (6,338 kW)
- Propulsion: 1 × Westinghouse geared turbine; 1 x propeller
- Speed: 17.7 kn (32.8 km/h; 20.4 mph)
- Boats & landing craft carried: 2 × LCMs; 1 × open LCPL; 18 × LCVPs; 2 × LCPRs; 1 × closed LCPL (Captain's Gig)
- Capacity: 2,900 long tons (2,900 t) DWT; 150,000 cu ft (4,200 m^{3}) (non-refrigerated)
- Troops: 87 officers, 1,475 enlisted
- Complement: 99 officers, 593 enlisted
- Armament: 1 × 5 in (127 mm)/38 caliber dual purpose gun; 1 × quad 40 mm (1.6 in) Bofors anti-aircraft (AA) gun mounts; 4 × twin 40mm Bofors (AA) gun mounts; 10 × single 20 mm (0.8 in) Oerlikon cannons AA mounts

Service record
- Part of: TransRon 18
- Operations: Assault and occupation of Okinawa Gunto (1–5 April 1945)
- Awards: American Campaign Medal; Asiatic–Pacific Campaign Medal; World War II Victory Medal; Philippine Liberation Medal

USS Neshoba (APA 216) was a Haskell-class attack transport in service with the United States Navy from 1944 to 1946. She was scrapped in 1975.

== History ==
Neshoba was of the VC2-S-AP5 Victory ship design type and was named for Neshoba County, Mississippi. She was laid down 3 July 1944, under Maritime Commission (MARCOM) contract, MCV hull 564, by Permanente Metals Corporation, Yard No. 2, Richmond, California; launched on 7 October 1944; sponsored by Mrs. Wendall E. Adams; and commissioned 16 November, Commander Martin J. Drury, USN. The conversion to an attack transport was made at Hunter's Point Ship Yard in San Francisco. The conversion consisted of installing Navy radio and radar equipment, armament, adding Welin davits for landing craft, and loading the landing craft themselves.

=== World War II ===
At the conclusion of this conversion, Neshoba took her shakedown, a coastal run from San Francisco to San Diego. During this cruise she attained her top speed of 19 kn (35 km/h; 22 mph). At San Diego, she was committed to Amphibious Training at which time the new boat crews got a feel of their craft. She acted as flagship for Transport Squadron Thirteen whose commanding officer at that time was Commodore John G. Moyer, USN. The training was supposed to last a period of two weeks, but sudden changes in the Pacific Fleet organization made Neshoba's entrance on the scene of action imperative and the training was cut short. She proceeded to San Pedro, California, where final repairs and checkups were performed.

Ten days were allotted for this work, then she loaded with a cargo of food at San Francisco and received her first set of combat sailing orders – telling her merely to "Proceed Pearl Harbor". Upon arriving at Pearl Harbor, the cargo was dispatched and its place was taken by a "human cargo" of hundreds of Seabees. Neshoba was instructed to sail for the Philippine Islands, stopping off at Eniwetok, Ulithi, and Palau on the way. After twenty days at sea, Neshoba arrived in Leyte Gulf on 20 February 1945. The Seabees were taken off and brought into Samar Island. While at Leyte Gulf, Neshoba was designated as the flagship of Commander Transport Division Forty Two, Captain Edwin T. Short, USN. Preparations were underway at this time for the eventual invasion and occupation of Okinawa Shima in the Ryukyu Islands.

Combined with Transport Divisions Forty and Forty-one, they made up Transport Squadron Fourteen commanded by Commodore Richardson, USN. It was decided to hold extensive maneuvers in Leyte Gulf for the ships and troops scheduled to take part in the forthcoming operation. Transport Squadron Fourteen was to carry troops and equipment of the 96th Infantry Division to the assault, so these troops were made subject to the maneuvers in Leyte Gulf. Maneuvers were to last for six days, during which time, two "dry runs" were made on the island of Leyte. Everything worked out as planned, and the high command set the date for the invasion of Okinawa on 1 April, Philippine time. Transport Squadrons Thirteen and Fourteen got underway from Leyte Gulf on 27 March 1945, for the four-day trip north to Okinawa.

Boats from Neshoba were assigned to take in the first six waves of assault troops. Since the landings were virtually unopposed, no casualties were inflicted on the crew, and upon completion of the unloading phase, many transports were ordered by Admiral Richmond K. Turner to return to Pearl Harbor. Captain Short, aboard Neshoba, was named Officer in Tactical Command (OTC) of fifteen ships in convoy, which left Okinawa on 5 April, and proceeded to Pearl, via Guam. At Guam she was loaded with ninety Japanese prisoners of war and sailed from Guam with her convoy on 10 April, bound for Pearl. Captain Short was relieved as CTD 42 by Captain Andrew R. Mack, USN. He continued as OTC for the remainder of the trip.

The convoy arrived on time at Pearl Harbor on 22 April, and many of the ships received sailing orders for the United States. Neshoba was not among them. Instead, she was ordered by AdComPhibspac to take part in training maneuvers at Maui. OTC for the training schedule was ComTransRon 19. It was during these practice runs that Neshoba achieved the remarkable record of lowering all her boats into the water in the record time of nine minutes. Upon conclusion of these maneuvers, she proceeded back to Pearl Harbor where her new orders read, "REPORT SAN FRANCISCO FOR LOADING". She was on her way early the next day, and 24 May, saw Neshoba passing under the Golden Gate Bridge. Most of the crew took a few days' leave and when they returned, Neshoba was ready to sail again. This time, it was Okinawa with a load of Naval Ship Repair Unit personnel. The first leg of the trip carried her all the way to Eniwetok Island non-stop. Due to unloading difficulties in Okinawa, ships were held at all ports in the Pacific to wait their turn to go there. Neshoba was held for three weeks at Eniwetok.

On 9 July 1945, Neshoba sailed in convoy to Ulithi, then to Okinawa. This trip to Okinawa did not find the same peaceful conditions as prevailed on D-Day. Attacks by kamikazes of the Japanese air forces were in full swing at the time. During the ship's five-day stay there, she was under several air raids, which did not come near the berth, and all hands were relieved when her orders came to depart on 29 July. Once again, it was convoy duty for Neshoba, but one of a very different nature. She was not in a convoy of ships of her type, but was the mother ship to upwards of seventy craft, ranging in size from LST's down to fleet ocean tugs. Captain Mack was in command of this convoy as it set out for Saipan. During the trip, a small, but very annoying typhoon was encountered, but all ships and craft weathered the storm and sailed into Saipan harbor on 6 August.

Army and Navy dischargees were taken aboard as passengers, and on 8 August 1945, Neshoba was told to take to the Pacific. The original orders read to proceed at top speed to San Francisco, but through some change of administrative orders, Neshoba was told to change course and head for Pearl Harbor. This order was carried out, but not for long, because further orders were soon forthcoming with instructions to bypass San Francisco and report to the Thirteenth Naval District, Seattle, Washington. The arrival at Seattle was heralded by a shore-based ovation. Following the debarkation of the passengers, the ship was brought over to the Bremerton Navy Yard for repairs. The yard workers concentrated mostly on the boilers, which were in serious need of attention. Temporary repairs took one week after which the headquarters detachment of the 97th Infantry Division was embarked at Pier Forty-two.

The commanding general aboard was Brigadier General Partridge. Neshoba once again put out to sea with original orders to carry her passengers to Leyte Island in the Philippines. A stop at Pearl Harbor was ordered and Neshoba made her reappearance there on 17 September 1945. Since there were only seven hundred army passengers on board, the Navy found it very convenient to embark an additional seven hundred men – sailors, marines, and Seabees – who were bound for Guam. The ship left Pearl Harbor on 20 September, a three-day stopover was made at Guam to disembark the new passengers, and the ship received her orders to continue with the 97th Infantry on to Yokohama, Japan.

Following her arrival, the troops were disembarked and Neshoba lay at dock, her holds and compartments empty, waiting to receive more passengers. It was during the brief stay in Yokohama that Neshoba was assigned to Task Group 16.12, popularly known in the Navy as "The Magic Carpet". Commanded by Rear Admiral Kendall, USN, in Pearl Harbor, the "Magic Carpet" fleet had the specific duty of moving eligible dischargees from overseas to the United States.

The remaining units of the 43rd Infantry Division were embarked at Pier Four in Yokohama for return to San Francisco over the shortest possible route. The Captain and the Commodore jointly agreed on taking the Great Northern Route, which is about 4,700 mi (7,600 km), so it cuts off about 2,000 mi (3,200 km) from the southern route.

Upon arriving in San Francisco and debarking troops, Neshoba headed for Mare Island Navy Yard for minor repairs.

Captain Drury and Lieut. Comdr. Davis were relieved of duty by Captain E. J. Sweeney, USNR, and Lt. D. M. Newbern as the executive officer, later promoted to lieutenant commander. Neshoba at this time was in dry dock, its first time, and only five short days were taken in the repairs, before she once more had to be readied for a non-stop voyage to Guam. On this trip the crew expected to celebrate the first birthday of the ship, but it so happened that they crossed the International Date Line, thereby "gaining" a day and skipping 15 November, the ship's "birthday", so the anniversary was celebrated on 16 November. (Neshoba was commissioned on 16 November 1944, so 16 November 1945, was her actual "birthday".) The ship arrived at Guam 23 November, where she was loaded with Marines to carry to China. With the escort of the Haverfield to clear mines in the Yellow Sea, the crew experienced cold weather for the first time and for most of the trip. On 30 November the hook dropped in the Yellow Sea about 20 mi (32 km) from the coast and liberty was granted for all hands in Tientsin. After a short stay in China the orders read once more for statewide and on 5 December, the ship departed for San Diego, California.

=== Post-war duties ===
Christmas and New Year's Day were spent tied up at the Destroyer Base in San Diego, awaiting more orders and passengers. They both came, and the ship headed for Guam on 11 January, and arrived on 26 January, debarking troops. After a very short stay in Guam, orders arrived for a return to San Francisco. There it was learned that Neshoba would be put out of active service on 13 March. With a new paint job, sealing of guns, compartments and everything ready for the storeroom, Neshoba, commonly known as the "Mighty N", left Mare Island for Stockton, California. She was to be a "mother ship" for five other ships tied together.

=== Decommissioning and fate ===
Decommissioned at Stockton, 4 December, she remained a unit of the Pacific Reserve Fleet until 4 September 1958, when she was transferred to the custody of the Maritime Administration (MARAD) and transferred to the National Defense Reserve Fleet, Suisun Bay Group, Benicia, California. She was struck from the Navy List, 1 October 1958. On 5 March 1975, she was sold to American Ship Dismantlers, Inc., for $210,001, to be scrapped. She was removed from the fleet on 26 March 1975.

== Notes ==
Citations

== Bibliography ==
Online resources

- "Neshoba". Dictionary of American Naval Fighting Ships. Naval History and Heritage Command. 12 August 2015. This article incorporates text from this source, which is in the public domain.
- "Kaiser Permanente No. 2, Richmond CA". Shipbuilding History. 13 October 2010.
- "USS Neshoba (APA-216)". NavSource. 2 May 2014.
- "NESHOBA (APA-216)". United States Department of Transportation. Archived from the original on 2 November 2016.
- Smallwood, Charles W.; Mackin, Clifford (1946). "The history of the U.S.S. Neshoba". United States Navy.
