= USS New Kent =

1944 Haskell-class attack transport

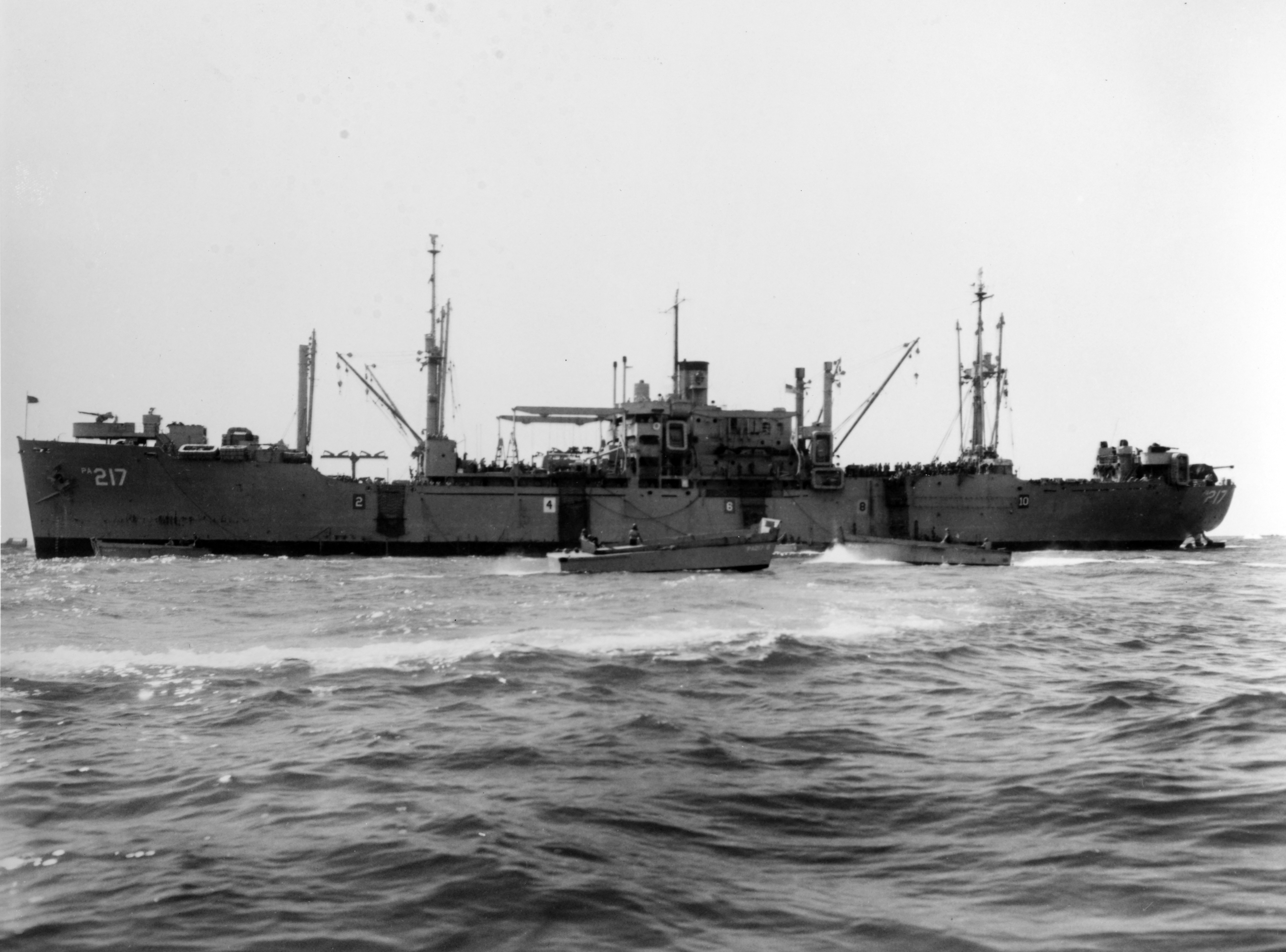
- New Kent in 1949

History

United States
- Name: New Kent
- Namesake: New Kent County, Virginia
- Ordered: as a Type VC2-S-AP5 hull, MCE hull 565
- Builder: Permanente Metals Corporation, Richmond, California
- Yard number: 565
- Laid down: 11 July 1944
- Launched: 12 October 1944
- Sponsored by: Mrs. W. J. Maher
- Commissioned: 22 November 1944
- Decommissioned: 29 July 1949
- Identification: Hull symbol: APA-217; Code letters: NPQN
- Honors and awards: 1 × battle star for World War II service
- Fate: Recommissioned by the Navy

United States
- Recommissioned: 10 October 1951
- Decommissioned: 12 July 1954
- Stricken: 1 October 1958
- Fate: Scrapped 1972

General characteristics
- Class & type: Haskell-class attack transport
- Type: Type VC2-S-AP5
- Displacement: 6,873 long tons (6,983 t) (light load); 14,837 long tons (15,075 t) (full load)
- Length: 455 ft (139 m)
- Beam: 62 ft (19 m)
- Draft: 24 ft (7.3 m)
- Installed power: 2 × Combustion Engineering header-type boilers; 8,500 shp (6,338 kW)
- Propulsion: 1 × Westinghouse geared turbine; 1 x propeller
- Speed: 17.7 kn (32.8 km/h; 20.4 mph)
- Boats & landing craft carried: 2 × LCMs; 1 × open LCPL; 18 × LCVPs; 2 × LCPRs; 1 × closed LCPL (Captain's Gig)
- Capacity: 2,900 long tons (2,900 t) DWT; 150,000 cu ft (4,200 m^{3}) (non-refrigerated)
- Troops: 80 officers, 1,475 enlister
- Complement: 56 officers, 480 enlisted
- Armament: 1 × 5 in (127 mm)/38 caliber dual purpose gun; 1 × quad 40 mm (1.6 in) Bofors anti-aircraft (AA) gun mounts; 4 × twin 40mm Bofors (AA) gun mounts; 10 × single 20 mm (0.8 in) Oerlikon cannons AA mounts

Service record
- Part of: TransRon 19
- Operations: Assault and occupation of Okinawa Gunto (1–7 April 1945)
- Awards: American Campaign Medal; Asiatic–Pacific Campaign Medal; World War II Victory Medal; Navy Occupation Service Medal; National Defense Service Medal

USS New Kent (APA-217) was a Haskell-class attack transport in service with the United States Navy from 1944 to 1949 and from 1951 to 1954. She was scrapped in 1972.

== History ==
=== Construction ===
New Kent was of the VC2-S-AP5 Victory ship design type and was named after New Kent County, Virginia. She was laid down 11 July 1944, under Maritime Commission (MARCOM) contract, MCV hull 565, by Permanente Metals Corporation, Yard No. 2, Richmond, California. She was launched 12 October 1944, sponsored by Mrs. W.J. Maher. The ship was commissioned on 22 November 1944.

=== World War II ===
New Kent was outfitted at the Naval Supply Depot, Oakland, California. The ship remained in the San Francisco Bay area until 8 December 1944, at which time she left the area, proceeding to San Pedro and later San Diego where she completed a shakedown period and engaged in amphibious training.

On 20 January 1945, New Kent left San Diego with the January replacements for the 4th Marine Aircraft Wing and cargo destined for Majuro and Kwajalein in the Marshall Islands. New Kent arrived at Pearl Harbor, Territory of Hawaii, on 26 January, and departed on 30 January en route for Majuro escorted by Edenton. While underway, the escort in attempting to regain proper station, rammed New Kent amidships sustaining severe damage to herself but was able to proceed under her own power to Pearl Harbor. New Kent proceeded to Majuro arriving on 6 February, and left 7 February, arriving at Kwajalein the following day.

After delivering her troops and cargo New Kent left Kwajalein on 10 February, arriving at Guadalcanal on 13 February. From this time until 15 March, the ship was engaged in combat loading troops and equipment of the 3rd Battalion, 1st Regiment, 1st Marine Division and in rehearsal exercises in the Guadalcanal-Russell Islands area preparing for the invasion of Okinawa.

On 15 March New Kent departed the Guadalcanal area, and after a short stop at Ulithi, arrived off the western beaches of Okinawa on the morning of L-Day, 1 April. Landing her troops that afternoon, New Kent sent a beach party ashore the next day and then remained in the transport area, subject to frequent enemy air attack, until departing in convoy for Pearl Harbor on 7 April. After stopping en route at Guam, the convoy reached Pearl Harbor on 23 April.

New Kent remained in the Hawaiian Islands for one month, engaged in amphibious training exercises off Hawaii and in air-submarine exercises off Nīhoa until 29 May. She then loaded and sailed for San Francisco arriving there on 4 June and then sailed up the coast arriving at Seattle 6 June.

She then proceeded to the Lake Washington Shipyards, Houghton, Washington arriving on 8 June. Repairs were to be made to the ship, however, because of a strike in the yards, little work was accomplished. The ship was moved to Puget Sound Navy Yard, Bremerton, Washington where the ship underwent overhaul until 26 June.

On 26 June New Kent loaded general cargo and Army Casual troops at Seattle and departed for Honolulu arriving there on 3 July. The ship then sailed for San Francisco on 5 July, with 300 Japanese prisoners of war along with Army and Navy Casual personnel, arriving on 11 July. While at San Francisco New Kent had her berthing compartments enlarged to accommodate more troops.

New Kent sailed for Leyte on 28 July, with Army casual troops and cargo, stopping en route at Eniwetok and Ulithi, arriving at San Pedro Bay, Leyte on 17 August. While at sea word had been received that Japan had accepted terms of surrender. New Kent remained in the Philippines for a little more than a month transporting Army troops to various positions on Luzon.

On 23 August, she sailed for Manila arriving there 25 August, and on 29 August, the ship proceeded to Subic Bay, returning the same day. On 9 September New Kent sailed in convoy from Manila for Lingayen Gulf and arrived at Aringay Point, Lingayen Gulf the next day. During the period between 10 and 16 September, the ship was combat loaded with troops and equipment of the 3rd Battalion, 136th Regiment, 33rd Infantry Division, 6th Army and attached units and engaged in rehearsal and training exercises in connection with the forthcoming landing at Wakayama, Honshū, Japan.

New Kent, in company with other transports, left Lingayen Gulf on 20 September, for Wakayama, Japan, where it arrived during the early morning of 25 September. Unloading her occupation troops the next day New Kent then sailed for Subic Bay the same afternoon, arriving 1 October, and then proceeding the same day for Leyte, arriving 3 October.

New Kent departed Leyte on 7 October, and arrived in Davao Gulf on the following day. She moved to Talomo Bay, Davao Gulf on 9 October and departed 15 October, having embarked the 2nd Battalion, 21st Infantry RCT, 24th Infantry Division and attached units bound for Okayama, Japan. The convoy arrived off Hiro-wan, Japan on 21 October, and the troops and cargo were discharged during the next two days. During the week spent in Japan, sightseeing parties from the ship visited the nearby large Japanese naval base at Kure as well as the site where the first atomic bomb was dropped at Hiroshima.

New Kent together with USS Sibley (APA-206) sailed on 27 October, for Manus, Admiralty Islands, arriving there on 5 November. There she embarked 2000 passengers for her first Magic Carpet voyage, to bring the troops home to San Pedro, California, 19 November.

On 26 November, Commander C. F. Swanson, USN, relieved Commander J.E. Baker, USNR, as commanding officer. New Kent sailed from San Diego on 5 December for Guam, Marianas Islands to make its second Magic Carpet run. The ship's destination was again changed, this time to Saipan, Marianas Islands, at which port the ship docked 21 December. After loading 1,980 passengers, the ship sailed for San Pedro, California, destination changed en route to San Francisco, where the ship arrived on 1 January 1946. Christmas and New Year's Day were celebrated aboard ship with special programs for all hands including a Roman Catholic mass, Christmas carols, Christmas gifts distributed by Santa Claus, and a turkey dinner.

On 31 December 1945, Commander Swanson reported that since the ship was commissioned it had been underway 228 days and had steamed a total of 195 days, 5 hours or 58,733 miles (94,522 km).

=== Post World War II Service ===
In mid-March 1946 New Kent steamed through the Panama Canal and arrived at Norfolk, Virginia on 20 March. For the next year she conducted amphibious training exercises along the East and Gulf coasts and in the Caribbean. On 29 July 1949 she was decommissioned, and berthed with the Texas Group, Atlantic Reserve Fleet. On 10 October 1951 she was re-commissioned and reassigned to amphibious training duty, resuming exercises along the shores of the Atlantic.

With the exception of a voyage to Casablanca in July 1952, New Kent continued her training operations until the Spring 1954, when, again inactivated, she returned to Orange, Texas on 12 July 1954. New Kent rejoined the Reserve Fleet on 17 September 1958 and was struck from the Navy List on 1 October 1958.

=== Fate ===
On 28 October 1971, New Kent was sold to Union Minerals & Alloys Corporation, along with eight other ships, for $467,100, with the condition that they would be scrapped. At the time she was based at Orange, Texas, as part of the National Defense Reserve Fleet, Mobile, Alabama, Group. On 24 July 1972 she was officially withdrawn from the Reserve Fleet.

== Awards ==
American Campaign Medal, Asiatic-Pacific Campaign Medal (with 1 battle star), World War II Victory Medal, Navy Occupation Service Medal (with Asia clasp), National Defense Service Medal, Philippine Liberation Medal.

== Notes ==
Citations

== Bibliography ==
Online resources

- "New Kent". Dictionary of American Naval Fighting Ships. Naval History and Heritage Command. 13 August 2015. This article incorporates text from this source, which is in the public domain.
- "Kaiser Permanente No. 2, Richmond CA". www.ShipbuildingHistory.com. 13 October 2010.
- "USS New Kent (APA-217)". NavSource. 16 September 2016.
- "NEW KENT (APA-217)". United States Department of Transportation. Archived from the original on 21 December 2014.
- Swanson, Clarence Floyd (31 December 1945). "The U.S.S. New Kent (APA 217) A Short History".
