= HNLMS Zeeland =

HNLMS Zeeland (Dutch: Hr.Ms. or Zr.Ms. Zeeland) may refer to following ships of the Royal Netherlands Navy:

- HNLMS Zeeland (1859), an Evertsen-class steam frigate
- HNLMS Zeeland (1897), a Holland-class protected cruiser
- HNLMS Zeeland (D809), a Holland-class destroyer
- HNLMS Zeeland (P841), a Holland-class offshore patrol vessel
