= USS Natrona =

1944 Haskell-class attack transport

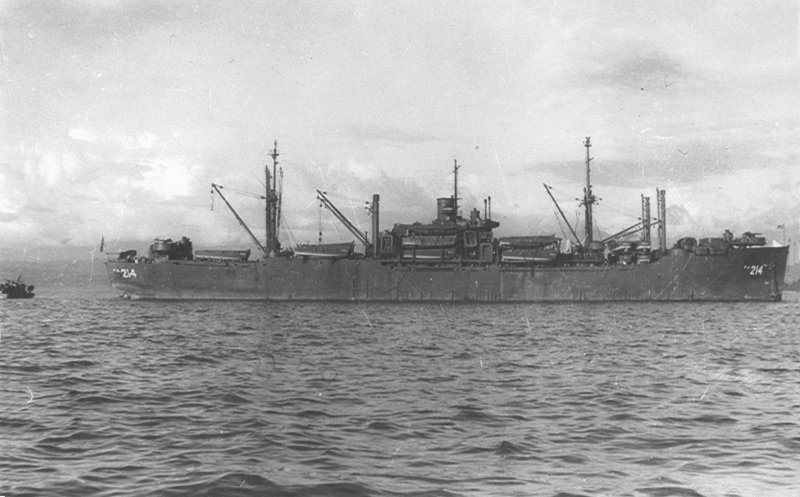
- USS Natrona (APA-214), at anchor, date and location unknown.

History

United States
- Name: Natrona
- Namesake: Natrona County, Wyoming
- Ordered: as a Type VC2-S-AP5 hull, MCE hull 562
- Builder: Permanente Metals Corporation, Richmond, California
- Yard number: 562
- Laid down: 30 June 1944
- Launched: 27 September 1944
- Sponsored by: Mrs Anna Louise Spigler
- Commissioned: 8 November 1944
- Decommissioned: 29 July 1946
- Stricken: 1 October 1958
- Identification: Hull symbol: APA-214; Code letters: NPQF
- Honors and awards: 1 × battle star for World War II service
- Fate: Sold for scrap, 5 March 1975, delivered, 1 April 1975

General characteristics APA Specifications
- Class & type: Haskell-class attack transport
- Type: Type VC2-S-AP5
- Displacement: 6,873 long tons (6,983 t) (light load); 14,837 long tons (15,075 t) (full load)
- Length: 455 ft (139 m)
- Beam: 62 ft (19 m)
- Draft: 24 ft (7.3 m)
- Installed power: 2 × Combustion Engineering header-type boilers, 465 psi (3,210 kPa) 750 °F (399 °C); 8,500 shp (6,338 kW)
- Propulsion: 1 × Westinghouse geared turbine; 1 x propeller
- Speed: 17.7 kn (32.8 km/h; 20.4 mph)
- Boats & landing craft carried: 2 × LCMs; 1 × open LCPL; 18 × LCVPs; 2 × LCPRs; 1 × closed LCPL (Captain's Gig)
- Capacity: 2,900 long tons (2,900 t) DWT; 150,000 cu ft (4,200 m^{3}) (non-refrigerated)
- Troops: 87 officers, 1,475 enlisted
- Complement: 56 officers, 480 enlisted
- Armament: 1 × 5 in (127 mm)/38 caliber dual purpose gun; 1 × quad 40 mm (1.6 in) Bofors anti-aircraft (AA) gun mounts; 4 × twin 40mm Bofors (AA) gun mounts; 10 × single 20 mm (0.8 in) Oerlikon cannons AA mounts

Service record
- Part of: TransRon 17
- Operations: Assault and occupation of Okinawa Gunto (26 March–30 June 1945)
- Awards: American Campaign Medal; Asiatic–Pacific Campaign Medal; World War II Victory Medal; Navy Occupation Service Medal; Philippine Liberation Medal

USS Natrona (APA-214) was a Haskell-class attack transport of the US Navy in World War II. She was of the VC2-S-AP5 Victory ship design type. Natrona was named for Natrona County, Wyoming.

== Construction ==
Natrona was laid down 30 June 1944, under Maritime Commission (MARCOM) contract, MCV hull 562, by Permanente Metals Corporation, Yard No. 2, Richmond, California; sponsored by Mrs. Anna Louise Spigler; launched 27 September 1944; and acquired and commissioned by the Navy on 8 November 1944.

== Service history ==
Following shakedown off Southern California, Natrona sailed for Hawaii 3 January 1945, as a unit of Transport Squadron 17. At Pearl Harbor, she debarked Marines, loaded men and equipment of the 806th Engineering Battalion, and continued her westward passage on 16 January. By 1 February, she reached Saipan, debarked her passengers and cargo, and sailed to Ulithi.

=== Invasion of Okinawa ===
At Ulithi, Natrona took on Marine night fighters and sailed for Leyte to prepare for operation "Iceberg", the invasion of the Ryūkyūs. On 21 March, Natrona, with Marine night fighters and 77th Infantry Division men and equipment on board, departed Dulag in TG 51.1. Early on 26 March, she arrived off Kerama Retto and proceeded to area "Jig".

At 05:39, she lowered away nine wave guide boats, then moved to "Transport Area Fox" where, at 07:05, she had her first experience with Japanese kamikazes. After that air attack she moved to "Inner Transport Area George" to commence discharging her cargo of fuel and ammunition into small craft. At 19:51, she proceeded to the night retirement area. Until 30 March, Natrona continued daylight replenishment of small craft in area "George", with nightly retirements.

On 1 April, Okinawa was invaded and on 2 April, the Kerama Retto anchorage was the scene of a 13-hour battle against suicide planes, swimmers and boats. On 6 April, the anchorage was subjected to its most severe kamikaze attack, during which Natrona bagged her first unassisted kill. On 7 April, she completed unloading 77th Division cargo. The following day, she crossed to the Hagushi Beach area of Okinawa to debark the Marine night fighters and then returned to Kerama Retto to transport the C.O., General Andrew Bruce and staff of the 77th Division to the same location.

Between 14 April and 10 July, Natrona remained anchored at Kerama Retto, serving as station and receiving ship. She also acted as Fleet Post Office, Headquarters for ComDesRon 2 and ComRepDesPac, Fleet Replacement Center, Fog Oil coordinator and distributor, and subsistence center for crews of damaged and sunken ships. On 10 July, the transport shifted to Buckner Bay and, on 15 July, departed for the US, a veteran of 16 weeks and 208 air attacks in Okinawan waters.

=== Transport duties ===
Natrona arrived San Francisco 5 August. Celebrating the end of the war there, she got underway again on 20 August, on the first of two extended transpacific runs carrying replacement troops to forward areas, occupation troops to Japan and returning veterans to the United States. On 13 January 1946, she completed her second cruise at San Pedro.

== Decommission ==
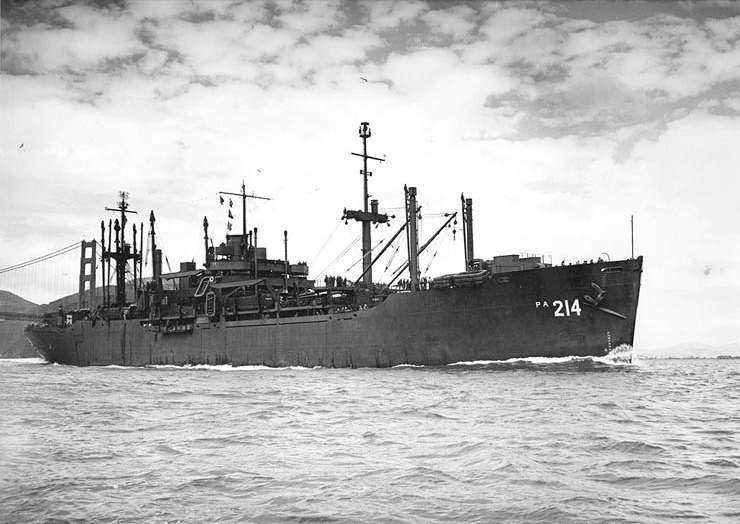
USS Natrona (APA-214), in San Francisco Bay, in late 1945 or early 1946. The missing gun tub on the bow indicates that this photo was taken after all of her armament except two 20mm guns was removed, an action taken before late January 1946.

Moving to Mare Island, she underwent inactivation overhaul, and on 29 July, decommissioned and entered the Pacific Reserve Fleet at Stockton, California.

She was transferred to the Maritime Administration (MARAD) 26 August 1958, and struck from the Navy List 1 October 1958. Natrona was laid up in the National Defense Reserve Fleet, Suisun Bay, California.

On 5 March 1975, she was sold to Nicolai Joffe Corporation, for $178,789.40, to be scrapped. She was delivered 1 April 1975.

== Awards ==
Natrona received one battle star for World War II service.

== Notes ==
Citations

== Bibliography ==
Online resources

- "Natrona". Dictionary of American Naval Fighting Ships. Naval History and Heritage Command. 12 August 2015. This article incorporates text from this source, which is in the public domain.
- "Kaiser Permanente No. 2, Richmond CA". www.ShipbuildingHistory.com. 13 October 2010.
- "USS Natrona (APA-214)". NavSource. 2 May 2014.
- "NATRONA (APA-214)". United States Department of Transportation. Archived from the original on 29 March 2016.
