= SS New Zealand Victory =

Victory ship of the United States

- Typical Victory Ship.

History

United States
- Name: SS New Zealand Victory
- Namesake: New Zealand
- Owner: War Shipping Administration
- Operator: Waterman Steamship Company
- Builder: California Shipbuilding Company, Los Angeles
- Laid down: January 25, 1944
- Launched: March 20, 1944
- Completed: May 13, 1944
- Fate: Sold, 1967

United States
- Name: SS Halcyon Tiger
- Namesake: Tiger
- Owner: Halcyon Steamship Company, of Wilmington, Del.
- Operator: Halcyon Steamship Company
- Fate: Sold, 1971

Panama
- Name: SS Palona
- Namesake: Dove, a symbol of Peace
- Owner: Universal Mariners S.A, of Panama
- Operator: Universal Mariners S.A
- Fate: Scrapped in Taiwan, 1973

General characteristics
- Class & type: VC2-S-AP3 Victory ship
- Tonnage: 7612 GRT, 4,553 NRT
- Displacement: 15,200 tons
- Length: 455 ft (139 m)
- Beam: 62 ft (19 m)
- Draught: 28 ft (8.5 m)
- Installed power: 8,500 shp (6,300 kW)
- Propulsion: HP & LP turbines geared to a single 20.5-foot (6.2 m) propeller, by Westinghouse Electric & Mfg. Co., Essington
- Speed: 16.5 knots
- Boats & landing craft carried: 4 Lifeboats
- Complement: 62 Merchant Marine and 28 US Naval Armed Guards
- Armament: 1 × 5 inch (127 mm)/38 caliber gun as Victory ship; 1 × 3 inch (76 mm)/50 caliber gun; 8 × 20 mm Oerlikon

The SS New Zealand Victory was the sixth Victory ship built during World War II. She was launched at Terminal Island by the California Shipbuilding Company on March 20, 1944 and completed on May 13, 1944. She was built in 109 days under the Emergency Shipbuilding program. The ship’s United States Maritime Commission designation was VC2-S-AP3, hull number 6 (V-6). SS New Zealand Victory served in the Pacific Ocean during WW2. SS New Zealand Victory was sixth of the new 10,500-ton class ship to be known as Victory ships. Victory ships were designed to replace the earlier Liberty Ships. Liberty ships were designed to be used just for WW2. Victory ships were designed to last longer and serve the US Navy after the war. The Victory ship differed from a Liberty ship in that they were: faster, longer and wider, taller, a thinner stack set farther toward the superstructure and had a long raised forecastle.

SS New Zealand Victory was christened and sponsored by Mrs. Walter Nash, wife of Mr. Walter Nash, ministry to Washington D.C. from New Zealand. The launching of The SS New Zealand Victory splashed into the water of Wilmington, Los Angeles.

== World War II ==
SS New Zealand Victory served in the Pacific War as a cargo ship in World War II as a United States Merchant Marine ship operated by Waterman Steamship Company. In 1947 she took relief supplies to Yokohama, Japan arriving on December 8, 1947. She was laid up for a short time in 1948 in the National Defense Reserve Fleet at Suisun Bay, till she was put back in service for the Korean War.

== Korean War ==
SS New Zealand Victory served as merchant marine naval ship supplying goods for the Korean War. About 75 percent of the personnel taken to Korean for the Korean War came by the merchant marine ship. SS New Zealand Victory transported ammunition, mail, food and other supplies. About 90 percent of the cargo was moved by merchant marine naval to the Korean war zone.

== Post war ==
In 1965 she was sold to Chas.Kurz & Co Inc of Wilmington, Delaware and kept her name. In 1967 she was sold to Halcyon Steamship Company of Wilmington, Delaware and renamed SS Halcyon Tiger. In 1971 she was sold to Universal Mariners S.A, of Panama and renamed MV Palona. In July 1973 she was scrapped in Taiwan by Chun Yuan Steel Corporation.

== See also ==
- List of Victory ships
- Liberty ship
- Type C1 ship
- Type C2 ship
- Type C3 ship

== Sources ==
- Sawyer, L.A. and W.H. Mitchell. Victory ships and tankers: The history of the ‘Victory’ type cargo ships and of the tankers built in the United States of America during World War II, Cornell Maritime Press, 1974, 0-87033-182-5.
- United States Maritime Commission:
- Victory Cargo Ships
