= List of Empire ships (F) =

Ships owned by the government of the UK

== Suffix beginning with F ==
=== Empire Fabian ===
Empire Fabian was an Empire F type coaster which was built by Henry Scarr Ltd, Hessle, Yorkshire. Laid down as CHANT 15 and renamed Fabric 15 before launch. Launched on 9 July 1944 as Empire Fabian and completed in July 1944. Sold in 1947 to Booker Brothers, McConnell & Co. Ltd and renamed Karani. To Booker Shipping (Demerara) Ltd in 1950. Sold in 1969 to L Gibbs & M McIntosh, Georgetown, Guyana and renamed Gibmac.

=== Empire Fable ===
Empire Fable was an Empire F type coaster which was built by Henry Scarr Ltd, Hessle. Laid down as CHANT 16 and renamed Fabric 16 before launch. Launched on 23 July 1944 as Empire Fable and completed in August 1944. Sold in 1946 to Cyprian Coastal Line Ltd. Operated under the management of P. Mantovani, Cyprus. Renamed Cyprus C in 1948. Sold in 1950 to De Malglaive Shipping Ltd, Windsor and renamed Yvonne Olivier. Sold in 1954 to Hellenic Levant Lines Ltd, Greece, and renamed Antonios. Under the management of S. Daifas & Co., Greece from 1957. Sold in 1958 to Société Co-operative des Petroles, Egypt and renamed Copetrole I.

=== Empire Fabric ===
Empire Fabric was an Empire F type coaster which was built by Henry Scarr Ltd, Hessle. Laid down as CHANT 14 and renamed Fabric 14 before launch. Launched in June 1944 as Empire Fabric and completed in July 1944. Sold in 1951 to Harbour Specialists Ltd, Hull and renamed Fenstock. Operated under the management of P. Bauer, London. Sold in 1952 to Torridge Coasters Ltd, Bideford, Devon and renamed Torridge Lass. Sold in 1963 to E. Desgagne, Quebec, Canada and renamed Ste-Marguerite. Managed by A. Cote, Quebec from 1965 and Bouchard Navigation Ltd, Quebec from 1966. Sold in 1970 to F. Lussier, Quebec, and renamed Prince Loys. Laid up in October 1972 due to mechanical damage and scrapped in 1977 at Île aux Coudres, Quebec.

=== Empire Facet ===
Empire Facet was an Empire F type coaster which was built by Goole Shipbuilding & Repairing Ltd, Goole. Laid down as CHANT 38 and renamed Fabric 38 before launch. Launched on 4 November 1944 as Empire Facet and completed that month. Sold in 1946 to Hull Gates Shipping Co. and renamed Hullgate. Operated under the management of Craggs & Jenkin Ltd. Sold in 1962 to Dendrinos & Varouchas, Greece and renamed Agios Nektarios. Sold later that year to T D Athanassiades, Greece. Caught fire in the Ionian Sea on 18 March 1963. Taken in tow by SS Lastovo but sank near Patras, Greece.

=== Empire Facility ===
Empire Facility was an Empire F type coaster which was built by Henry Scarr Ltd, Hessle. Laid down as CHANT 20 and renamed Fabric 20 before launch. Launched in October 1944 as Empire Facility and completed that month. Sold in 1946 to F. T. Everard & Sons Ltd and renamed Flexity. Scrapped in January 1962 at Krimpen aan den IJssel, Netherlands.

=== Empire Factor ===
Empire Factor was an Empire F type coaster which was built by Goole Shipbuilding & Repairing Ltd, Goole, Yorkshire. Laid down as CHANT 29 and renamed Fabric 29 before launch. Launched in May 1944 as Empire Factor and completed in July 1944. Sold in 1947 to Coe Line Ltd, London, and renamed Coe Jean. Sold in 1950 to Southern Shipping Co. Ltd, Isle of Man and renamed Barrule. Sold in 1954 to C. M. & D. M. Watterson, Isle of Man and renamed Gansey. Arrived on 26 December 1964 at Dalmuir, West Dunbartonshire for scrapping.

=== Empire Fairbairn ===
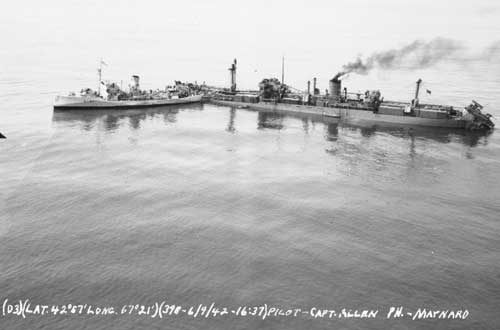
Kronprinsen being assisted by HMCS Summerside.

Empire Fairbairn was a 7,073 GRT cargo ship which was built by Barclay, Curle & Company, Glasgow. Laid down as Empire Fairbairn and launched on 17 February 1942 as Kronprinsen for the Norwegian Government. Torpedoed on 9 June 1942 by U-432 south of Cape Sable Island, Nova Scotia, Canada (42°53′N 67°11′W). Beached at West Pubnico with her stern blown off. Temporary repairs carried out, departed on 23 July 1942 under tow for Halifax. Departed on 9 October 1942 under tow for Boston, United States for repairs. Sold in 1945 to Olsen & Ugelstad, Norway. Sold in 1952 to Compagnia Navigazione Porto Alegre Sa, Panama and renamed Vori. Sold in 1967 to Liminship Compagnia Navigazione, Greece and renamed Lukia M. Sprang a leak on 10 February 1969 in the Yellow Sea, 50 nautical miles (93 km) south west of Barren Island (29°29′N 124°16′E). Abandoned and later towed to Shanghai, China. Reported to have been seized by the Chinese Government.

=== Empire Fairhaven ===
Empire Fairhaven was an Empire F type coaster which was built by Goole Shipbuilding & Repairing Ltd, Goole. Laid down as CHANT 30 and renamed Fabric 30 before launch. Launched on 22 June 1944 as Empire Fairhaven and completed in July 1944. Sold in 1946 to F. T. Everard & Sons Ltd and renamed Fixity. Arrived on 3 March 1961 at Thos. W. Ward, Grays, for scrapping.

=== Empire Fairplay ===
Empire Fairplay was an Empire F type coaster which was built by Goole Shipbuilding & Repairing Ltd, Goole. Laid down as CHANT 40 and renamed Fabric 40 before launch. Launched on 16 December 1944 as Empire Fairplay and completed in January 1945. . Operated under the management of Great Yarmouth Shipping Co. Ltd. Sold in 1951 to Great Yarmouth Shipping Co. Ltd and renamed Lynn Trader. A new diesel engine was fitted in 1953. Sold in 1960 to Fouad Hassan Hamza, Port Said, Egypt and renamed Hamza I. Scrapped by 1995.

=== Empire Fairway ===
Empire Fairway was an Empire F type coaster which was built by Goole Shipbuilding & Repairing Ltd, Goole. Laid down as CHANT 41 and renamed Fabric 41 before launch. Launched on 16 January 1945 as Empire Fairway. Sold in 1949 to Overseas Fish Import Co. and renamed Helen Fairway. Operated under the management of Great Yarmouth Shipping Co. Ltd. Sold in 1951 to J. Carter (Poole) Ltd and renamed Selborne. Sold in 1956 to Whitehaven Shipping Co. Ltd and renamed Tynehaven. Operated under the management of Anthony & Bainbridge Ltd. Sold in 1959 to Desgagnés Navigation Ltd (Capt. Roger & Capt. Denis Desgagnés, owners in Saint Joseph de la Rive, Québec, Canada), and renamed Champlain. The trunk was modified and the vessel became a single hold/single hatch hull. Sold in 1971 to Desgagnés & Perron Inc. (Ile aux Coudres, Québec, Canada), and renamed Gilani. Rebuilt to carry woodpulp and woodchips. Capsized on 22 April 1972 and sank at Vercheres Wharf, Montreal, Quebec, Canada. Refloated and repaired. Reported sold in 1978 and placed under the Honduran flag. Later reported lost but loss unconfirmed.

=== Empire Fairy ===
Empire Fairy was a 275 GRT tug which was built by Cochrane & Sons Ltd, Selby, Yorkshire. Launched on 5 January 1942 and completed in May 1942. To the Admiralty in 1944. Sold in 1948 to the Rangoon Port Commissioners, Rangoon, India, and renamed Nathamee.

=== Empire Faith ===
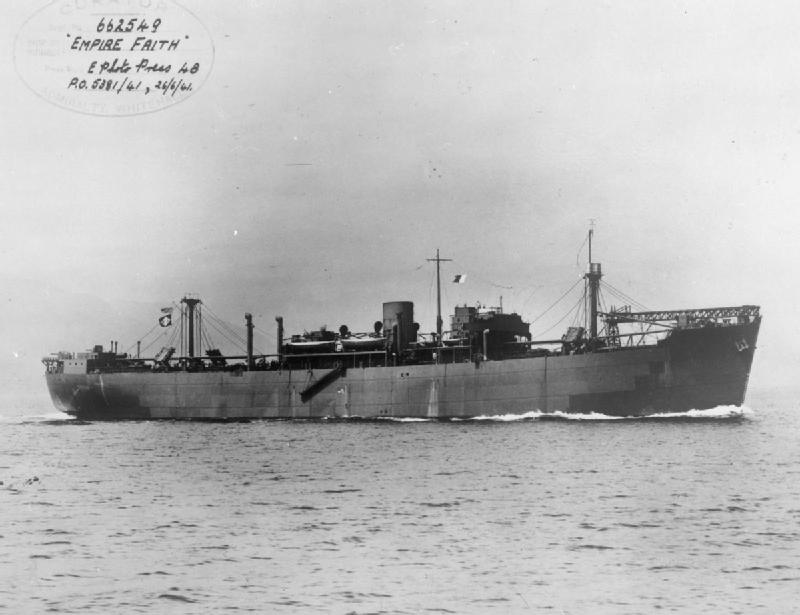
Empire Faith

Empire Faith was a 7,061 GRT CAM ship which was built by Barclay, Curle & Co. Ltd, Glasgow. Launched on 4 March 1941 and completed in June 1941. Sold in 1946 to Johnston Warren Lines Ltd and renamed Jessmore. Sold in 1958 to Maritime & Commercial Corporation Ltd, Panama and renamed Antiope. Sold in 1964 to Global Navigation Co. Inc., Panama, and renamed Global Venture. Operated under the management of Wah Kwong & Co., Hong Kong. Arrived in August 1971 at Kaohsiung, Taiwan for scrapping.

=== Empire Fal ===
Empire Fal was a 4,880 GRT cargo ship which was built by Irvine's Shipbuilding and Drydock Co. Ltd, West Hartlepool. Launched in 1914 as Pengreep for Chellew Navigation Co. Ltd, London. Seized in June 1941 by Vichy French forces at Casablanca, Morocco and renamed Ste Jacqueline. Seized in November 1942 by British forces in a damaged and unseaworthy state. Renamed Pengreep in 1943, to MoWT later that year and renamed Empire Fal. Scuttled on 2 July 1945 northwest of Scotland with a cargo of Italian gas bombs deemed too dangerous to discharge.

=== Empire Falcon ===
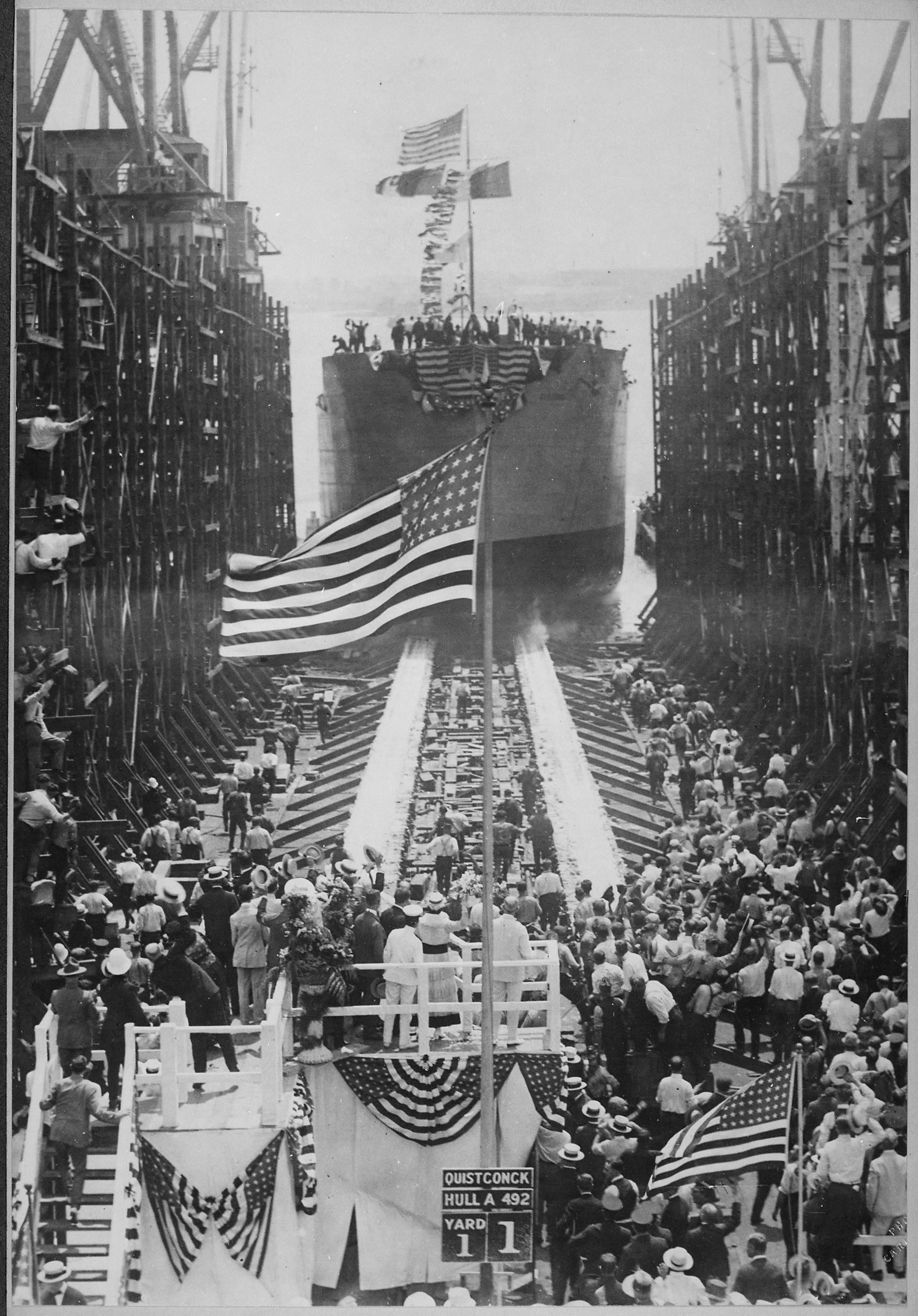
Launch of Quistconck.

Empire Falcon was a 5,144 GRT (7,500 DWT cargo ship which was built by American International Shipbuilding, Hog Island, Philadelphia, Pennsylvania. Launched on 5 August 1918 by Mrs Woodrow Wilson as Quistconck for the United States Shipping Board (USSB). Completed in November 1918. To Lykes Brothers - Ripley Steamship Co. Inc. in 1933. To MoWT in 1941 and renamed Empire Falcon. Sold in 1946 to Rowland & Marwoods Steamship Co. and renamed Barnby. Sold in 1952 to Societa de Navigazione Maliveras SA, Panama and renamed Mariandrea. Scrapped in March 1953 at Troon, Ayrshire.

=== Empire Falkland ===
Empire Falkland was a 6,987 GRT cargo ship which was built by Harland & Wolff Ltd, Belfast. Launched on 2 September 1944 and completed in February 1945. Sold in 1946 to Scottish Shire Line Ltd and renamed Stirlingshire. Operated under the management of Turnbull, Martin & Co. Ltd, Glasgow. Arrived on 2 September 1966 at Bruges, Belgium for scrapping.

=== Empire Falstaff ===
Empire Falstaff was a 7,067 GRT cargo ship which was built by Lithgows Ltd, Port Glasgow. Launched on 8 April 1943 and complete in May 1943. To the French Government in 1945 and renamed Commandant Mantelet. Sold in 1950 to Société Navale Delmas-Vieljeux, France and renamed Commandant le Bilboul. Sold in 1954 to Eastern Shipping Corp., Liberia and renamed Monrovia. Collided on 26 May 1959 with SS Royalton in Lake Huron and sank 11 nautical miles (20 km) north of Thunder Bay Island, USA.

=== Empire Fanal ===
Empire Fanal was an Empire F type coaster which was built by Henry Scarr Ltd, Hessle. Laid down as CHANT 46 and renamed Fabric 46 before launch. Launched in November 1944 and completed in December 1944. Sold in 1946 to F. T. Everard & Sons Ltd and renamed Futurity. Partly dismantled in 1960 at Greenhithe, Kent and arrived on 18 May 1960 at Thos. W. Ward, Grays, Essex for scrapping.

=== Empire Fancy ===
Empire Fancy was a 7,123 GRT cargo ship which was built by Burntisland Shipbuilding Company Ltd, Fife. Launched on 16 November 1944 and completed in January 1945. Sold in 1947 to W. A. Souter & Co. Ltd, Newcastle upon Tyne and renamed Sheaf Mount. Sold in 1957 to Harrisons (Clyde) Ltd and renamed Valldemosa. Sold in 1961 to Mullion & Co. Ltd, Hong Kong and renamed Ardfinnan. Sold in 1968 to Mullion & Co. Ltd, Gibraltar and renamed Court Harwell. Arrived on 9 June 1969 at Hong Kong for scrapping.

=== Empire Fane ===
Empire Fane was an Empire F type coaster which was built by Goole Shipbuilding & Repairing Ltd, Goole. Laid down as CHANT 33 and renamed Fabric 33 before launch. Launched on 4 August 1944 as Empire Fane. Sold in 1946 to F. T. Everard & Sons Ltd and renamed Fluidity. A new diesel engine was fitted in 1957. Sold in 1960 to Gaselee & Son Ltd, London, and renamed Apar. Used as a tug mooring and storage hulk at Limehouse Reach, River Thames. Scrapped at Dartford, Kent c1974.

=== Empire Fanfare ===
Empire Fanfare was an Empire F type coaster which was built by Henry Scarr Ltd, Hessle. Laid down as CHANT 19 and renamed Fabric 19 before launch. Launched in August 1944 as Empire Fanfare and completed in October 1944. Sold in 1946 to F. T. Everard & Sons Ltd and renamed Festivity. Scrapped in August 1961 at Nieuw-Lekkerland, Netherlands.

=== Empire Fang ===
Empire Fang was an Empire F type coaster which was built by Goole Shipbuilding & Repairing Ltd, Goole. Laid down as CHANT 39 and renamed Fabric 39 before launch. Launched on 13 November 1944 as Empire Fang and completed in January 1945. Sold in 1946 to William Robertson & Son, Glasgow and renamed Morion. Sold in 1952 to Nevill Long & Co. Ltd, Glasgow and renamed Longboat. Sold in 1954 to Gerard Harvey, Quebec which later became Transport Maritime Harvey Ltee. A new diesel engine was fitted in 1956. Sold in 1972 to Edgar Lavoie & Frères, Québec which later became Joseph A. Lavoie and still later Lavoie & Fils, renamed De Lavoye. Sold in 1978 to Vapores Orinoco, Panama. Reflagged to Honduras in 1979. Thought to have been scrapped by 1995.

=== Empire Faraway ===
Empire Faraway was an Empire F type coaster which was built by Henry Scarr Ltd, Hessle. Laid down as CHANT 21 and renamed Fabric 21 before launch. Launched in October 1944 as Empire Faraway and completed in November 1944. Sold in 1946 to Seaway Coasters Ltd and renamed Seabrook. Operated under the management of Howard & Sons, London. Sold in 1954 to F. T. Everard & Sons Ltd and renamed Fortunity. Scrapped in February 1962 in Nieuw-Lekkerkerk, Netherlands.

=== Empire Farjeon ===
Empire Farjeon was an Empire F type coaster which was built by Goole Shipbuilding & Repairing Ltd, Goole. Laid down as CHANT 37 and renamed Fabric 37 before launch. Launched on 18 October 1944 as Empire Farjeon and completed in November 1944. Sold in 1946 to Drakelow Steamship Co., Cardiff and renamed Drakedene. Sold in 1966 to K. Perrakis, Greece and renamed Vivian. Converted to a tanker and fitted with a new diesel engine c1968. Sold in 1970 to D. & P. Theodossiou & Others, Greece. Still in service c1987 supplying Spetses with fresh water.

=== Empire Farm ===
Empire Farm was a 250 GRT tug which was built by Scott & Sons, Bowling, West Dunbartonshire. Launched on 30 May 1942 and completed in June 1942. Sold in 1947 to Wilson Sons & Co., Brazil and renamed Lady Rosemary. To Wilson Sons SA Comercio Industria, Brazil in 1966 and renamed Marte.

=== Empire Farmer ===
Empire Farmer was a 7,050 GRT cargo ship which was built by Sir W. G. Armstrong, Whitworth & Co. (Shipbuilders) Ltd, Newcastle upon Tyne. Launched on 8 March 1943 and completed in May 1943. To the French Government in 1945 and renamed Administrateur en Chef Thomas. Sold in 1950 to Achille Lauro, Italy, and renamed Santagata. She ran aground on 24 November 1950 on the Goodwin Sands, 3 nautical miles (5.6 km) northeast of the South Goodwin Lightship, a total loss.

=== Empire Farnham ===
Empire Farnham was an Empire F type coaster which was built by Goole Shipbuilding & Repairing Ltd, Goole. Laid down as CHANT 34 and renamed Fabric 34 before launch. Launched on 2 September 1944 as Empire Farnham and completed that month. Sold in 1946 to Metcalf Motor Coasters Ltd and renamed Jim M. A new diesel engine was fitted in 1959. Engine removed in December 1964 and ship scrapped in January 1965 at Thos. W. Ward, Grays, Essex.

=== Empire Farouche ===
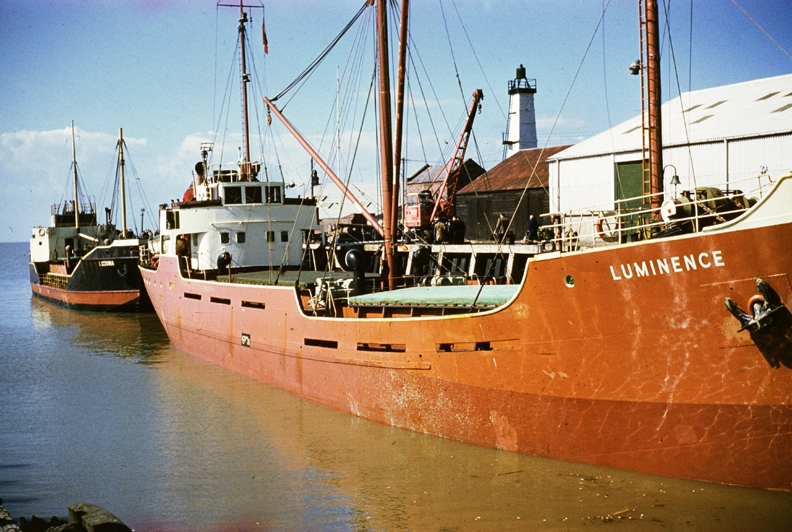
Lizzonia (left)

Empire Farouche was an Empire F type coaster which was built by Goole Shipbuilding & Repairing Ltd, Goole. Laid down as CHANT 35 and renamed Fabric 35 before launch. Launched on 19 September 1944 as Empire Farouche and completed in October 1944. Sold in 1946 to J Wharton (Shipping) Ltd and renamed Lizzonia. The new diesel engine was fitted in 1956. Collided with MV Arctic Ocean on 16 March 1961 3 nautical miles (5.6 km) west-northwest of the Varne Lightvessel, English Channel and sank.

=== Empire Farrar ===
Empire Farrar was a 1,923 GRT cargo ship which was built by Stettiner Oderwerke, Stettin. Launched in 1944 as Michael Ferdinand for H Ferdinand, Germany. Seized in May 1945 as a war prize at Sønderborg, Denmark. To MoWT and renamed Empire Farrar. Placed under the management of Stratton Shipping Co. in 1947. Sold in 1949 to Stanley Steamship Co., Hong Kong, and renamed Admiral Hardy. Sold in 1955 to Sig S Aarstads Rederi, Norway. Sold in 1965 to Scanship Corp, Panama, and renamed Dumai Trader. Operated under the management of Panama Sea Express Line, Norway. Management passed to Manchester Navigation Ltd, Panama in 1967. Scrapped in March 1967 at Kaohsiung, Taiwan.

=== Empire Farrier ===
Empire Farrier was an Empire F type coaster which was built by Henry Scarr Ltd, Hessle. Laid down as CHANT 48 and renamed Fabric 48 before launch. Launched in November 1944 and completed in December 1944. Sold in 1947 to R H Hunt & Sons, Hull and renamed River Ouse. Sold in 1952 to Braywick Shipping Co. Ltd and renamed Braywick. Operated under the management of J P Hadoulis Ltd, London. Sold in 1953 to South Coast Shipping Co. Ltd. Converted into a sand dredger and renamed Sand Diver. Operated under the management of South Coast Shipping Co. Ltd. Sold to her managers in 1956 and placed under the management of William Cory & Son Ltd. Scrapped in 1966 at Thos. W. Ward, Grays, Essex.

=== Empire Farringay ===
Empire Farringay was an Empire F type coaster which was built by Goole Shipbuilding & Repairing Ltd, Goole. Laid down as CHANT 36 and renamed Fabric 36 before launch. Launched on 2 October 1944 and completed in November 1944. Sold in 1946 to J. H. K. Griffin, Swansea. Was re-engined at different times between 1965 and 1972, and fitted with triple screws. Rebuilt in 1972, now 461 GRT (533 DWT). Sold in 1979 to Compagnia de Navigazione Panajosyane SA, Panama and renamed Claire. Scrapped in March 1981 at La Corunna, Spain.

=== Empire Farringdon ===
Empire Farringdon was an Empire F type coaster which was built by Henry Scarr Ltd, Hessle. Laid down as CHANT 18 and renamed Fabric 18 before launch. Launched in August 1944 as Empire Farringdon and completed in September 1944. Sold in 1946 to De Malglaive Shipping Ltd, Windsor, and renamed Susie Olivier. Sold in 1948 to Booker Brothers, McConnell & Co. Ltd and renamed Mahiri. New diesel engine fitted in 1962. Operated under the management of Island Shipping Co. Ltd, Trinidad from 1972. Sprang a leak on 19 February 1974 when 94 nautical miles (174 km) southeast of Tobago. Taken in tow but capsized and sank in the Gulf of Paria (10°37′N 61°34′W)

=== Empire Fashion ===
Empire Fashion was an Empire F type coaster which was built by Goole Shipbuilding & Repairing Ltd, Goole. Laid down as CHANT 32 and renamed Fabric 32 before launch. Launched on 22 July 1944 as Empire Fashion and completed in August 1944. Sold in 1946 to F. T. Everard & Sons Ltd and renamed Frivolity. Scrapped in August 1961 at Thos. W. Ward, Grays, Essex.

=== Empire Fastness ===
Empire Fastness was an Empire F type coaster which was built by Henry Scarr Ltd, Hessle. Laid down as CHANT 47 and renamed Fabric 47 before launch. Launched in November 1944 and completed in December 1944. Sold in 1946 to F. T. Everard & Sons Ltd and renamed Firmity. Scrapped in December 1964 at Krimpen aan den IJssel, Netherlands.

=== Empire Fathom ===
Empire Fathom was an Empire F type coaster which was built by Henry Scarr Ltd, Hessle. Laid down as CHANT 49 and renamed Fabric 49 before launch. Launched in December 1944 as Empire Fathom and completed in January 1945. Sold in 1946 to B. W. Steamship, Tug & Lighter Company, Craggs & Jenkin Ltd, Hull and renamed Fosdyke. Sold in 1961 to J. P. Desgagnes, Quebec, and renamed Fort Carillon. Sold in 1972 to L. Tremblay, Quebec, and renamed Janolyne. Sold in 1975 to J. P. Benoit & G. Tremblay and renamed Fermont. Operated under the management of Transport Maritime Harvey Ltee, Quebec. Laid up in 1978 at Petite-Rivière-Saint-François, Quebec. Reported sold 1987 for conversion to a floating restaurant but she remained idle in Petite-Rivière-Saint-François until sold again in 1991 to a US citizen and renamed Mon Ami.

Beached during a gale on 1 January 1991 at Seal Island, Nova Scotia, Canada (43°24′N 24°03′W) while en route to Texas. Her back was broken and she was declared a total loss. The wreck still exists today.

=== Empire Faun ===
Empire Faun was an 846 GRT coastal tanker which was built by Goole Shipbuilding & Repairing Co. Ltd. Launched on 12 October 1942 and completed in February 1943. Loaned to the Greek Navy in 1951 and renamed Poseidon. Became Royal Fleet Auxiliary ship RFA Sirios (pennant number A345) in 1959. Sold in 1962 to the Greek Navy.

=== Empire Faversham ===
Empire Faversham was an Empire F type coaster which was built by Henry Scarr Ltd, Hessle. Laid down as CHANT 17 and renamed Fabric 17 before launch. Launched in June 1944 as Empire Faversham and completed in September 1944. Sold in 1947 to Whitehaven Shipping Co. Ltd and renamed Fawdon. Operated under the management of Anthony & Bainbridge Ltd. Sold in 1952 to Booker Brothers, McConnell & Co. Ltd and renamed Maduni. A new diesel engine was fitted in 1959. Sold in 1970 to Pedonomou Lines Ltd, Trinidad, and renamed Herma A. Foundered on 19 July 1975 in a storm while moored at Port of Spain, Trinidad.

=== Empire Favour ===
Empire Favour was a 7,050 GRT cargo ship which was built by Caledon Shipbuilding & Engineering Co. Ltd, Dundee. Launched on 22 August 1945 and completed in November 1945. Sold in 1947 to the Britain Steamship Co. Ltd and renamed Epsom. Operated under the management of Watts, Watts & Co. Ltd. Sold in 1950 to Haldin & Phillips Ltd and renamed Errington Court. Sold in 1956 to M. A. Embiricos, Greece, and renamed Penelope. Sold in 1964 to Franco Shipping Co., Greece, and renamed Andromachi. Damaged on 25 June 1969 by Israeli shelling at Suez and set on fire. The ship was abandoned and scrapped in March 1976 at Arabiya, Egypt.

=== Empire Favourite ===
Empire Favourite was an Empire F type coaster which was built by Goole Shipbuilding & Repairing Ltd, Goole. Laid down as CHANT 31 and renamed Fabric 31 before launch. Launched on 10 July 1944 as Empire Favourite. Sold in 1946 to F. T. Everard & Sons Ltd and renamed Formality. Scrapped in September 1962 at Krimpen aan den IJssel.

=== Empire Fawley ===
Empire Fawley was a 7,392 GRT cargo ship which was built by John Readhead & Sons Ltd, South Shields. Launched on 25 April 1945 and completed in May 1945. Sold in 1946 to Clan Line Steamers Ltd and renamed Clan Mackinlay. Arrived on 2 November 1962 at Hong Kong for scrapping.

=== Empire Fay ===
Empire Fay was an 807 GRT coastal tanker which was built by A. & J. Inglis Ltd, Glasgow. Launched on 26 December 1942 and completed in March 1943. Sold in 1946 to Shell Company of East Africa Ltd and renamed Kleinella. Operated under the management of the Anglo-Saxon Petroleum Co. Ltd. To Shell Mex & BP Ltd in 1948 and renamed Shellbrit. Renamed BP Marketer in 1952. Sold in 1964 to Sarda Bunkers SpA, Italy, and renamed Sarroch. Scrapped in September 1983 in Naples, Italy.

=== Empire Fenchurch ===
Empire Fenchurch was a 1,047 GRT coaster which was built by John Lewis & Sons Ltd, Aberdeen. Launched on 6 November 1945 and completed in February 1946. Sold in 1946 to J. Stewart & Co. (Shipping) Ltd and renamed Yewforest. Sold in 1954 to O. Dorey & Sons Ltd, Guernsey and renamed Perelle. Towed to Gothenburg, Sweden in 1961 for scrapping but leased out as a floating warehouse in Denmark. Reported to have been dismantled in August 1962 in Sweden, but was in service in 1965 as a barge, renamed Tor.

=== Empire Field ===
Empire Field was a 7,244 GRT cargo ship which was built by William Doxford & Sons Ltd, Sunderland. Launched on 23 September 1941 and completed in January 1942. To the Norwegian Government in 1942 and renamed Prins Harald. Torpedoed on 20 November 1942 and sunk by U-263 240 nautical miles (440 km) west of Gibraltar (35°55′N 10°14′W).

=== Empire Fir ===
Empire Fir was a 250 GRT tug which was built by Scott & Sons Ltd, Bowling. Launched on 9 October 1941 and completed in December 1941. Sold in 1946 to the London and North Eastern Railway and renamed Central No 3. To the British Transport Commission, Grimsby in 1949. To the British Transport Docks Board in 1961 and renamed Rampside. Sold in 1973 to Maritime Commercial Enterprises, Greece and renamed Poseidon. Sold in 1976 to N E Vercicos, Greece and renamed Vernicos Fani. Scrapped in 1986 in Greece.

=== Empire Firth ===
Empire Firth was a 325 GRT coaster which was built by Richards Ironworks Ltd, Lowestoft. Launched in March 1941 and completed in August 1941. Sold in 1947 to J Campbell, Irvine and renamed Annick. Sold in 1954 to A/S Lo-nes Rederi and renamed Lones. Operated under the management of T. Horvi & Sandvik, Norway. Sold in 1958 to Ross Line Ltd, Sunderland and renamed Sunderland. Sold in 1968 to North-East by East Shipping Co. Ltd and renamed North Trader. Placed under the management of N Jadavji & Hirji, Kenya in 1969, sold later that year to United Youth Shipping Co., Tanzania and renamed Tanzania.

=== Empire Fisher ===
Empire Fisher was a 268 GRT trawler which was built by Reiherstieg Schiffswerfte & Maschinenfabrik, Hamburg. Launched in 1922 as Herrlichkeit for Nordsee Deutsche Hochsee Fischerei Bremen, Cuxhaven. Captured on 13 February 1940 by HMS Glasgow and escorted to Lerwick. To MoWT and renamed Empire Fisher. Sold in 1947 to Hunter Fishing company. Sold in 1948 to BISCO for scrapping. Resold to W. J. Sweeney, Dublin. Scrapped in March 1952 at Passage West, County Cork.

=== Empire Fitzroy ===
Empire Fitzroy was an 890 GRT coastal tanker which was built by A. & J. Inglis, Glasgow. Launched on 12 June 1945 and completed in October 1945. Sold in 1952 to F. T. Everard & Sons Ltd and renamed Alignity. Scrapped in November 1971 at Blyth, Northumberland.

=== Empire Flag ===
Empire Flag was a 7,050 GRT cargo ship which was built by Sir W. G. Armstrong-Whitworth & Co. (Shipbuilders) Ltd, Newcastle upon Tyne. Launched on 2 June 1943 and completed in October 1943. Sold in 1946 to Donaldson Atlantic Line Ltd and renamed Carmia. Sold in 1954 to Blue Star Line Ltd and renamed Victoria Star. Sold in 1955 to Williamson & Co. Ltd, Hong Kong and renamed Inchearn. Scrapped in August 1966 in Osaka, Japan.

=== Empire Flamborough ===
Empire Flamborough was a 4,191 GRT cargo ship which was built by William Pickersgill & Sons Ltd, Sunderland. Launched on 19 November 1945 and completed in March 1946. Sold in 1946 to C. Ostberg, Norway and renamed Vindeggen. Sold in 1948 to Navigation Maritime Bulgare, Bulgaria and renamed Bulgaria. Scrapped in September 1976 at Split, Yugoslavia.

=== Empire Flame ===
Empire Flame was a 7,069 GRT CAM ship which was built by Cammell Laird & Co. Ltd, Birkenhead. Launched on 12 May 1941 and completed in June 1941. Sold in 1945 to Crawford Shipping Co. Ltd, London and renamed Dunkery Beacon. Sold in 1955 to R Simberg, Finland, and renamed Rissa. Sold in 1961 to Paulins Rederi A/B, Finland, and renamed Augusta Paulin. Scrapped in May 1969 in Shanghai.

=== Empire Flamingo ===
Empire Flamingo was a 4,994 GRT cargo ship which was built by American International Shipbuilding, Hog Island. Launched in 1920 as Jolee for the USSB. To Lykes Brothers-Ripley Steamship Co. Inc. in 1933. To MoWT in 1941 and renamed Empire Flamingo. Sunk on 9 June 1944 as a blockship as part of "Gooseberry 4" at Juno Beach, Arromanches, Calvados. Bow section salvaged in 1948, taken in tow to Newport, Monmouthshire for scrapping, but sank on 26 October 1948 3 nautical miles (5.6 km) south of the Longships Lighthouse. Raised in 1949 and re-sunk off Gwennap Head.

=== Empire Flaminian ===
Empire Flaminian was a 2,763 GRT cargo ship which was built by W Harkness & Sons Ltd, Middlesbrough. Launched in 1917 as Flamian for Ellerman & Papayanni Lines. To MoWT in 1944 and renamed Empire Flaminian. In 1947 she became a stevedore training ship at Marchwood, Hampshire for the Royal Engineers Port Unit. Arrived on 21 July 1950 under tow at Dover, Kent for scrapping.

=== Empire Fletcher ===
Empire Fletcher was an 8,191 GRT tanker which was built by Harland & Wolff Ltd, Belfast. Launched on 4 April 1942 and completed in July 1942. Sold in 1944 to the Dutch Government and renamed Backhuysen. Sold in 1947 to NV Petroleum Maatschappij, Netherlands and renamed Chama. Sold in 1955 to Derna Compagnia Navigazione SA, Panama and renamed Anastasia. Operated under the management of J Livanos & Sons Ltd, London. Arrived on 9 September 1959 at Savona, Italy for scrapping.

=== Empire Flint ===
Empire Flint was an 8,129 GRT tanker which was built by Swan, Hunter & Wigham Richardson Ltd, Wallsend. Launched on 29 March 1941 and completed in August 1941. Sold in 1945 to Athel Line Ltd and renamed Athelstane. Operated under the management of United Molasses Co. Ltd. Sold in 1952 to Skibs A/S Vaholm and renamed Oakley. Operated under the management of Holmen & Vaboen. Sold in 1959 to H. A. Moller A/S, operated under the management of T Klaveness, Oslo. Scrapped in February 1962 in Hamburg, West Germany.

=== Empire Flodden ===
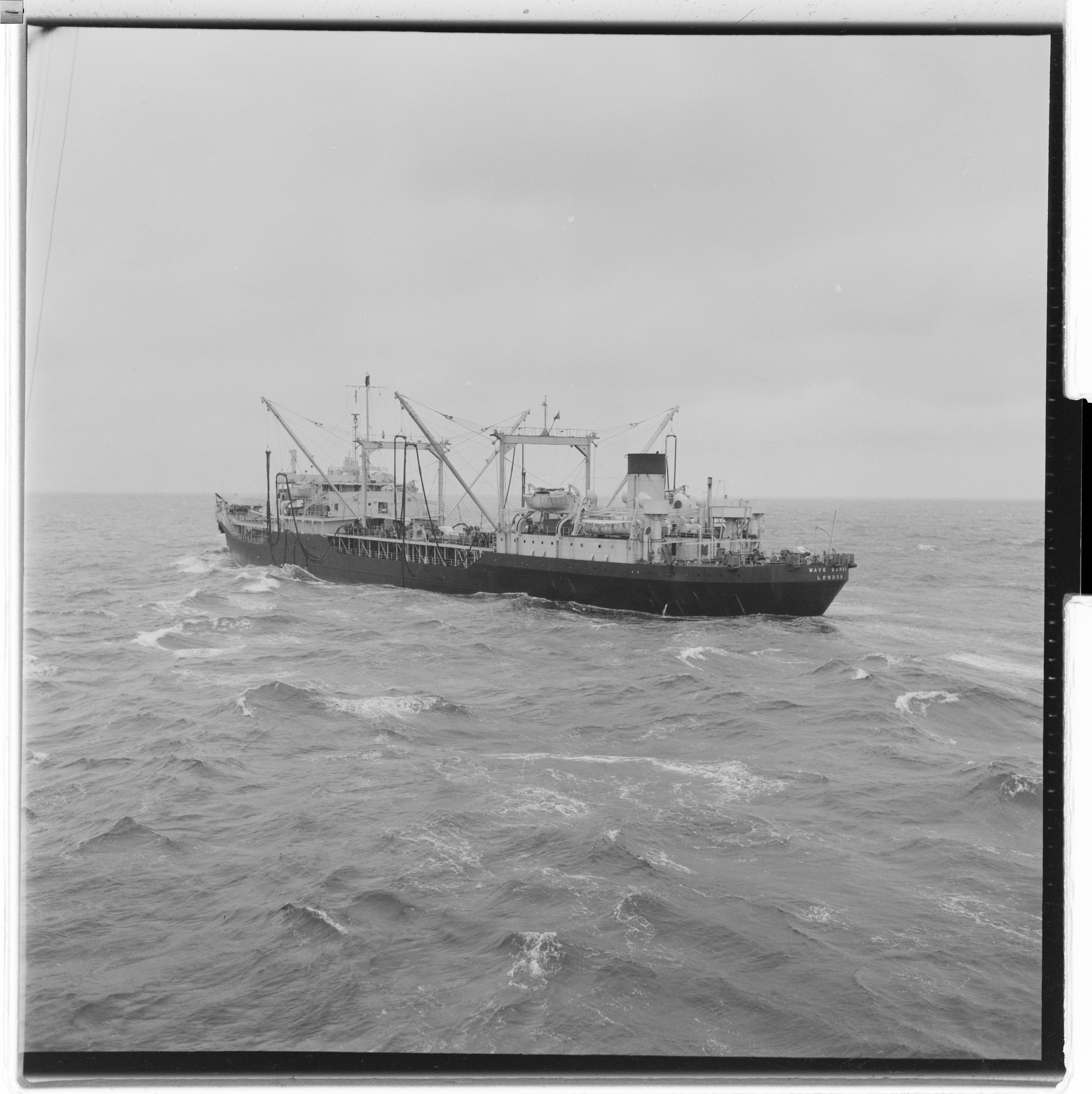
RFA Wave Baron

Empire Flodden was an 8,159 GRT tanker which was built by Furness Shipbuilding Co. Ltd, Haverton Hill-on-Tees. Launched on 19 February 1946 as Empire Flodden and completed in June 1946 as RFA Wave Baron. Laid up at Devonport in December 1969. Sold in March 1972 to Dutch shipbreakers, resold and arrived on 23 April 1972 at Bilbao, Spain for scrapping.

=== Empire Flora ===
Empire Flora was a 292 GRT tug which was built by Cochrane & Sons Ltd, Selby. Launched on 16 March 1945 and completed in August 1945. Sold in 1948 to Risdon Beazley Ltd and renamed Topmast 14. Sold in 1949 to Panfido Rim., Italy and renamed Taurus. Scrapped in August 1984 in Porto Nogaro, Italy.

=== Empire Florizel ===
Empire Florizel was a 7,056 GRT cargo ship which was built by Lithgows Ltd, Port Glasgow. Launched on 21 April 1943 and completed in June 1943. Bombed on 21 July 1943 and sunk at Augusta, Italy during the Allied invasion of Sicily.

=== Empire Foam ===
Empire Foam was a 7,047 GRT cargo ship which was built by Swan, Hunter and Wigham Richardson Ltd, Wallsend. Launched on 13 March 1941 and completed in May 1941. Sold in 1946 to Graigaur Shipping Co. Ltd and renamed Graigaur. Operated under the management of I. Williams & Co. Ltd, Cardiff. Sold in 1957 to Marinos & Frangos Ltd, London and renamed Maltezana. Sold in 1958 to Great Southern Steamship Co. Ltd, Hong Kong, and renamed Johore Bahru. Arrived on 24 July 1963 at Kure, Japan for scrapping. Note: Ship is mentioned as CAM ship in Hague records (e.g. HX.139).

=== Empire Folk ===
Empire Folk was an Empire Maple-class tug which was built by R Dunston Ltd, Thorne, Yorkshire. Launched on 18 March 1942 and completed in May 1942. Sold in 1947 to the French Government. To the Chamber of Commerce, Dieppe in 1950 and renamed Jehan de Bethancourt. Scrapped in April 1970 at Fécamp, France.

=== Empire Forager ===
Empire Forager was a 2,588 GRT suction hopper dredger which was built in 1946 by William Simons & Co. Ltd, Renfrew. Sold in 1949 to the Argentinian Government and renamed MOP 229-C. Renamed La Descanisada in 1949 and MOP 223-C in 1958. Scrapped in 1976 in Argentina.

=== Empire Ford ===
Empire Ford was a 325 GRT coaster which was built by J. S. Watson Ltd, Gainsborough, Lincolnshire. Launched on 28 May 1941 and completed in September 1941. She ran aground on 10 January 1943 off Seahouses, Northumberland, and abandoned the next day. Refloated and anchored, but broke free and drifted and grounded off the Farne Islands and sank. Refloated on 27 February 1943 and towed to Warkworth harbour. Arrived at the River Tyne on 6 March 1943 under tow for repairs. Sold in 1943 to the Dutch Government and renamed Noorderhaven. Sold in 1947 to Société Navigation d'Import et d'Export, Dakar, Senegal and renamed Saint Honorat. A new diesel engine was fitted in 1951. Sold in 1965 to D. Vassilatos, Greece, and renamed Korali. Sold in 1966 to K Savva Brothers, Greece and renamed Maria S. Sold in 1967 to P. & M. Gogis, Greece, and renamed Sofia Gogi. Sold to new Greek owners in 1975 and renamed Konstantinos Gaviotis. Sold in 1976 to G Atsalis & Co., Greece and renamed Agios Georgios.

=== Empire Foreland ===
Empire Foreland was an 873 GRT coaster which was built by Goole Shipbuilding & Repairing Co. Ltd. Launched on 2 December 1940 and completed in March 1941. Sold in 1945 to Williamstown Shipping Co. Ltd and renamed Norfolkbrook. Operated under the management of Comben Longstaff & Co. Ltd. Sold in 1950 to Gem Line Ltd and renamed Agate. Operated under the management of William Robertson, Glasgow. Sold in 1961 to Di Guido Pio Tomei, Italy and renamed Silvani Tomei. Sold in 1972 to the Naval Protector, Italy, and renamed Sabbiatore Primo. Converted to a barge in 1984 and name deleted from shipping registers.

=== Empire Forest ===
Empire Forest was a 7,025 GRT cargo ship which was built by John Readhead & Sons Ltd, South Shields. Launched on 15 January 1942 and completed in March 1942. Sold in 1946 to Clan Line Steamers Ltd and renamed Clan Allan. Sold in 1958 to Bullard, King & Co. Ltd and renamed Umtali. To Clan Line Steamers Ltd in 1959 and reverted to Clan Allan name. Sold in 1961 to Mullion & Co., Hong Kong, and renamed Ardsirod. Arrived on 12 October 1966 at Kaohsiung, Taiwan for scrapping.

=== Empire Forth ===
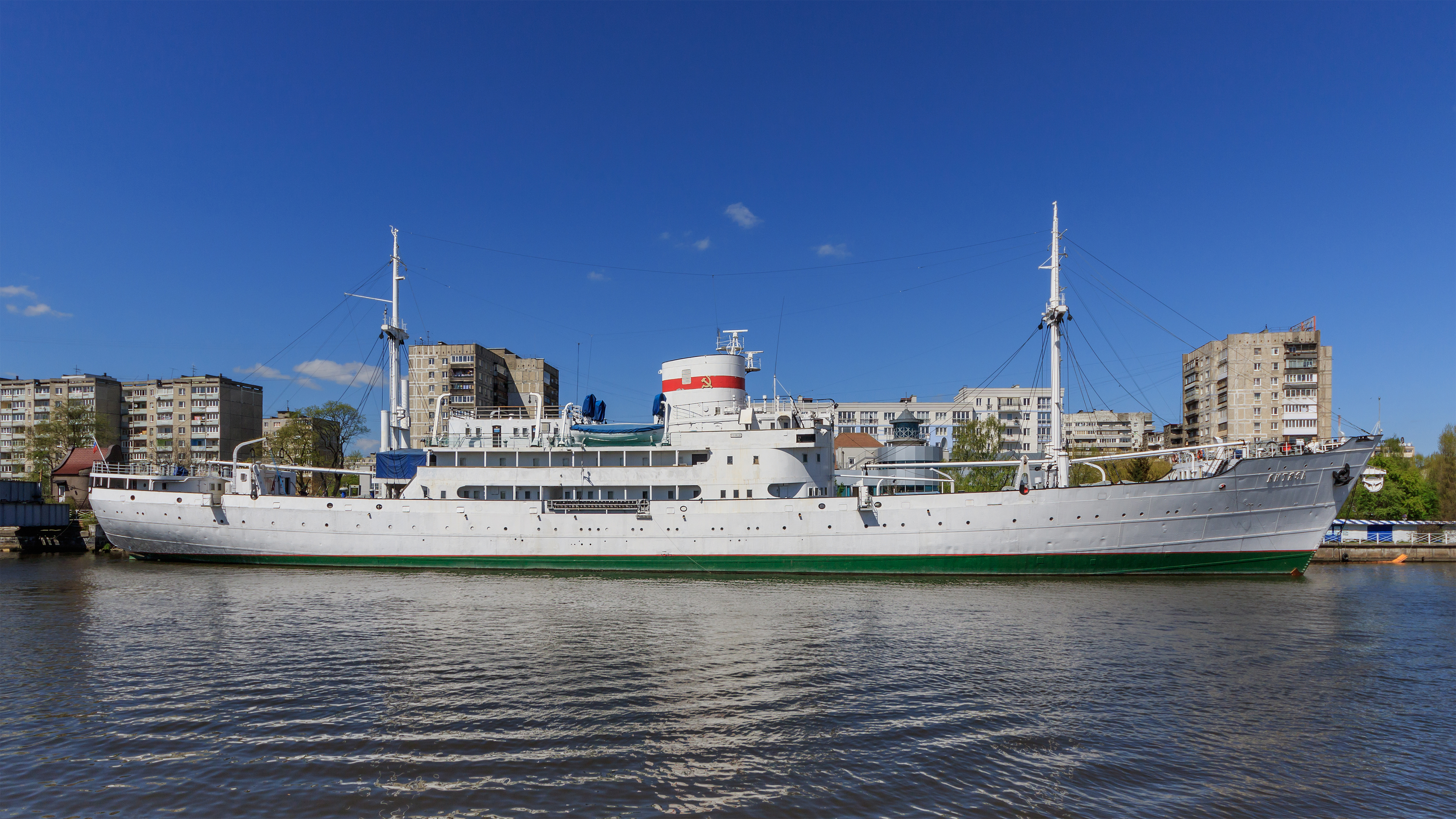
Vityaz, ex Empire Forth

Empire Forth is a 2,471 GRT cargo ship which was built by Deutsche Schiff- und Maschinenbau AG, Bremen. Launched in 1939 as Mars for Neptun Line. Damaged in December 1943 in an air raid on Bremen. Seized in May 1945 at Copenhagen. To MoWT and renamed Empire Forth. Allocated to USSR in 1946 and renamed Equator. Renamed Vityaz in 1949, used as a research ship. Retired in 1979 and preserved in 1982 at Leningrad. Now part of the Museum of the World Oceans, Kaliningrad.

=== Empire Fortune ===
Empire Fortune was a 6,140 GRT cargo ship which was built by John Readhead & Sons Ltd, South Shields. Launched on 9 November 1942 and completed in January 1943. To the Dutch Government in 1943 and renamed Van Honthorst. Sold in 1945 to Halcyon Lijn NV, Rotterdam and renamed Stad Schiedam. Arrived on 2 December 1961 at Rotterdam and was withdrawn from service. Scrapped at Bruges, Belgium in January 1962.

=== Empire Fowey ===
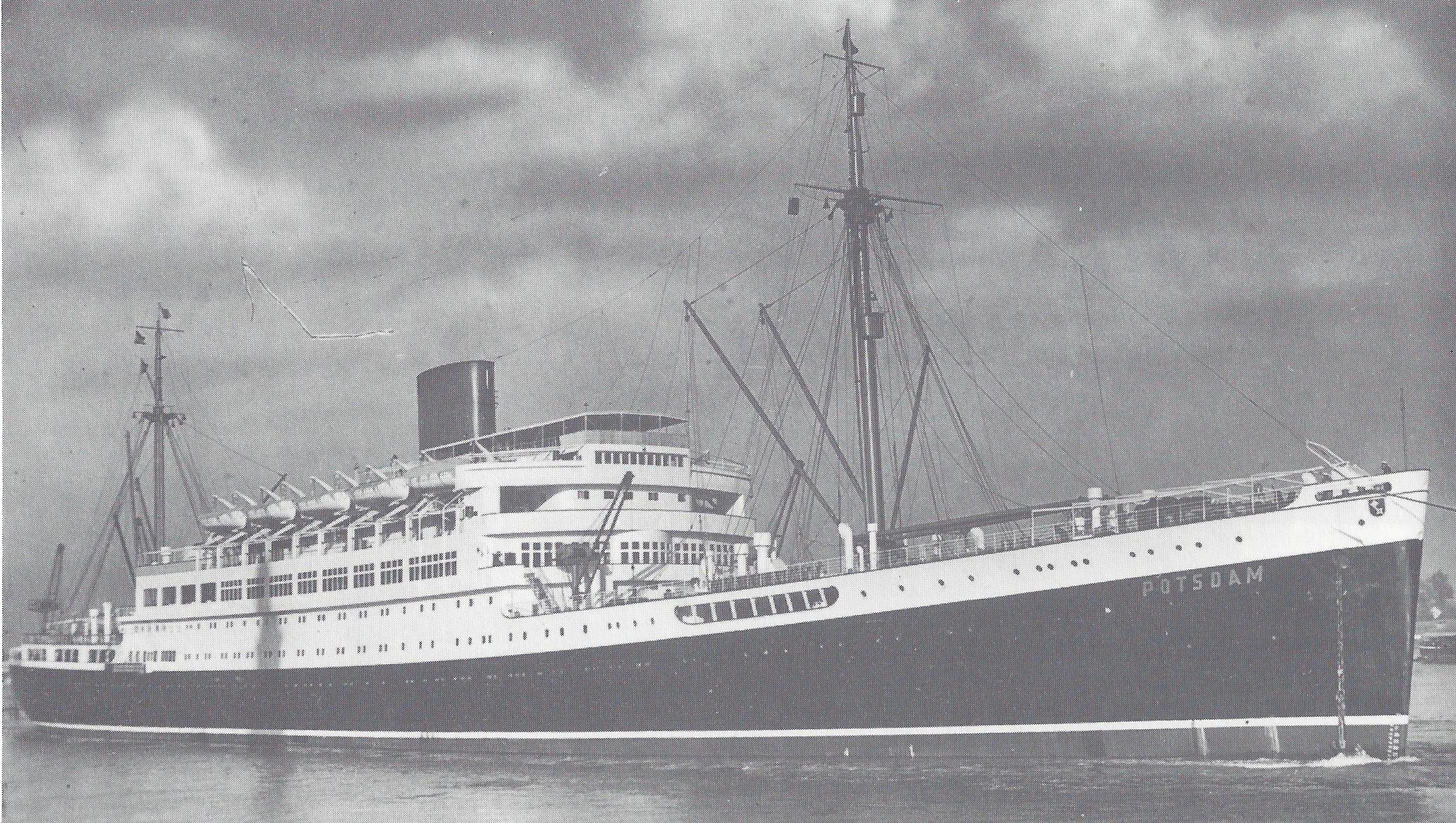
Potsdam

Empire Fowey was a 19,047 GRT turbo-electric ocean liner that was built by Blohm & Voss, Hamburg. Launched in 1935 as Potsdam for the Hamburg America Line but sold to Norddeutscher Lloyd before completion. Was en route to the US when war was declared. Returned to Germany by sailing around the top of Scotland and down the North Sea. Used as an accommodation ship at Hamburg, then as a troopship to Norwegian and Baltic ports. Took part in the Evacuation of East Prussia.

Seized on 13 May 1945 at Flensburg. To MoWT and renamed Empire Jewel. Arrived on 19 June 1945 at Kiel and placed under armed guard with a Royal Navy contingent to prevent the Germans from using her to block the Kaiser Wilhelm Kanal. After arrival at Brunsbüttel the armed guard left and she was at anchor for three weeks with a full German crew. Sailed on 20 July 1945 with a detachment of Army guards bound for Methil.

To Belfast in July 1945 for conversion to a troopship by Harland & Wolff Ltd. Completed in April 1946 and renamed Empire Fowey. Her high-pressure boilers caused problems for her crew, who were not used to this type of boiler. In March 1947 she was towed to the Clyde and refitted again, new boilers and geared turbines fitted, and the accommodation again refitted. Served as a troopship until 1960 also carrying servicemen's families to the naval dockyard on Singapore in the early 1950s and then chartered to the Pan-Islamic Steamship Co., Pakistan. Sold to them in 1960 and renamed Safina-E-Hujjaj. Scrapped in October 1976 at Gadani ship-breaking yard, Pakistan.

=== Empire Frank ===
Empire Frank was a 268 GRT tug which was built by John Crown & Sons Ltd, Sunderland. Launched on 2 September 1942 and completed in November 1942. Sold in 1946 to Steel & Bennie Ltd and renamed Brigadier. She ran aground on 21 February 1960 at Horse Island, off Ardrossan, Ayrshire. A total loss.

=== Empire Franklin ===
Empire Franklin was a 7,292 GRT cargo ship which was built by John Readhead & Sons Ltd, South Shields. Launched on 28 April 1941 and completed in June 1941. Sold in 1945 to Bank Line Ltd and renamed Hazelbank. Operated under the management of A. Weir Shipping & Trading Co. Ltd. Sold in 1957 to Compagnia Navigazione Nuevo Mundo SA, Panama and renamed Irinicos. Operated under the management of Syros Shipping Co. Ltd, London. Sold in 1962 to Paleocrassos Bros, remaining under Syros's management. Sold in 1963 to Salinas Compagnia Navigazione SA, Panama and renamed Iris II. Chartered to Salinas and still under Syros's management. Arrived on 15 February 1967 at Hong Kong for scrapping.

=== Empire Fraser ===
Empire Fraser was a 1,923 GRT cargo ship which was built by Deutsche Werft, Hamburg. Launched in 1944 as Weserbrück for Norddeutscher Lloyd. Seized in May 1945 at Hamburg in an incomplete state. Completed in 1946 as Empire Fraser for MoWT. Sold in 1947 to Indo-China Steam Navigation Co. Ltd and renamed Chaksang. On 7 September 1949, there was an explosion on board while moored in Hong Kong harbour. The cause was sabotage, the ship had been delayed in sailing due to a typhoon. Extensive fires caused the ship to sink the next day, a total loss. Raised on 22 March 1950 and scrapped in Hong Kong.

=== Empire Fred ===
Empire Fred was a 235 GRT tug which was built by A. Hall & Co. Ltd, Aberdeen. Launched on 11 September 1942 and completed in November 1942. To the Admiralty in 1943. Converted in 1970 to an accommodation ship at Chatham Dockyard. Scrapped in April 1974 at Hendrik-Ido-Ambacht, Netherlands.

=== Empire Freetown ===
Empire Freetown was a 7,131 GRT cargo ship which was built by Burntisland Shipbuilding Co. Ltd. Launched on 29 January 1945 and completed in March 1945. Sold in 1946 to B. J. Sutherland & Co. Ltd and renamed Inverness. Sold in 1953 to Turnbull, Scott & Co. Ltd and renamed Redgate. Sold in 1963 to Compagnia Marvalia Navigazione SA, Panama and renamed Agia Elpis. Sold in 1967 to Southern Cross Shipping Co. Ltd, Cyprus. Scrapped in July 1968 in Shanghai.

=== Empire Frieda ===
Empire Frieda was a 292 GRT tug which was built by Ferguson Bros Ltd, Port Glasgow. Launched on 22 October 1945 and completed in January 1946. To the Admiralty in 1947 and renamed Oriana. Struck a mine on 19 January 1948 off Clacton on Sea, Essex and sank, a total loss.

=== Empire Friendship ===
Empire Friendship was a 7,058 GRT cargo ship which was built by Short Brothers Ltd, Sunderland. Launched on 19 February 1943 and completed in May 1943. To the French Government in 1945 and renamed Matelots Pilien et Peyrat. Sold later that year to Compagnie Havraise de Navigation à Vapeur, Paris. On 29 October 1962, she dragged her anchors and broke free from her moorings when laid up at Port-de-Bouc, Bouches-du-Rhône, France. Driven onto a breakwater at the entrance to the Canal de Marseille au Rhône. Refloated on 3 November 1962 but a constructive total loss and scrapped at La Seyne-sur-Mer, Var, France.

=== Empire Frome ===
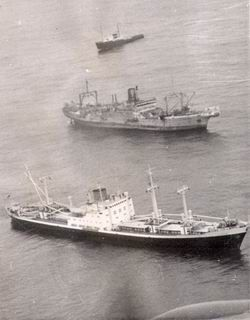
Empire Frome

Empire Frome was a 2,774 GRT cargo ship which was built by Flensburger Schiffbau-Gesellschaft, Flensburg. Laid down in 1945, seized in May 1945 before launching. Completed in 1948 as Empire Frome for MoWT. Sold in 1953 to Submarine Cables Ltd, London, and converted into a cable-laying ship. Renamed Ocean Layer in 1955. On 15 June 1959 a fire started in the crew quarters when the ship was at 48°26′N 19°03′W. The ship was abandoned and on 17 June the salvage tug Wotan took her in tow. Arrived on 21 June at Falmouth still on fire she was declared a constructive total loss and scrapped in December 1959 at Hendrik-Ido-Ambacht, Netherlands.

=== Empire Frost ===
Empire Frost was a 7,005 GRT cargo ship which was built by Lithgows Ltd, Port Glasgow. Launched on 2 September 1940 and completed in November 1940. Bombed on 12 March 1941 in St Georges Channel, taken in tow by Dutch tug Seine the next day but bombed again and sunk.

=== Empire Fulham ===
Empire Fulham was a 222 GRT coastal tanker which was built by W. J. Yarwood & Sons (1938) Ltd, Northwich. Launched in June 1944 and completed in October 1944 for the Admiralty. Sold in February 1967 to J. P. Langford Shipping Ltd, Sharpness. Renamed Fulham in 1974.

=== Empire Fulmar (I) ===
Empire Fulmar was a 7,775 GRT cargo ship which was built by Federal Shipbuilding and Drydock Co, Kearny, New Jersey. Completed in May 1941 as Hawaiian Shipper for Matson Navigation Co. To MoWT in 1942 and renamed Empire Fulmar. To United States Maritime Commission (USMC) later that year and renamed Hawaiian Shipper. Converted to a troopship completed in February 1943 for the United States Navy. To USMC in 1946 and renamed America Transport. Sold in 1958 to States Steamship Co., USA and renamed Washington. Renamed Michigan in 1960. To United States Maritime Administration in 1960. To Waterman Steamship Corp, USA in 1969 and renamed Morning Light. Scrapped in July 1973 in Kaohsiung, Taiwan.

=== Empire Fulmar (II) ===
Empire Fulmar was a 4,820 GRT LST (3) which was built by Davie Shipbuilding & Repairing Co. Ltd, Lauzon, Quebec. Launched in November 1945 as HMS LST 3524, later becoming HMS Trumpeter. Scrapped at Singapore in January 1969 having spent some time laid up there.

=== Empire Fusilier (I) ===
Empire Fusilier was an 8,202 GRT tanker which was built by Harland & Wolff Ltd, Belfast. Launched on 8 August 1942 as Empire Fusilier. Completed February 1943 as Empire Bombardier. Sold in 1946 to British Tanker Co. and renamed British Bombardier. Arrived on 15 March 1959 at Tamise, Belgium for scrapping.

=== Empire Fusilier (II) ===
Empire Fusilier was a 5,404 GRT cargo ship which was built by Cantiere Cerusa, Voltri, Italy. Launched in 1921 as Mincio for P. Ravano Fu Marco, Genoa. Seized on 10 June 1940 at Liverpool. To MoWT and renamed Empire Fusilier. Torpedoed on 9 February 1942 and sunk by U-85 south east of St. John's, Newfoundland (44°45′N 47°25′W).

== See also ==
The above entries give a precis of each ship's history. For a fuller account see the linked articles.

== Sources ==
- Mitchell, W H; Sawyer, L A (1990). The Empire Ships (Second ed.). London, New York, Hamburg, Hong Kong: Lloyd's of London Press Ltd. ISBN 1-85044-275-4.
- Mitchell, W. H.; Sawyer, L. A. (1995). The Empire Ships. London, New York, Hamburg, Hong Kong: Lloyd's of London Press Ltd. ISBN 978-1-85044-275-2.
