= List of classes of British ships of World War II =

This is a list of all British ship classes that served in World War II. This list includes all British ship classes including those which did not serve with the Royal Navy or British military in general.

== Aircraft carriers ==
=== Fleet carriers ===
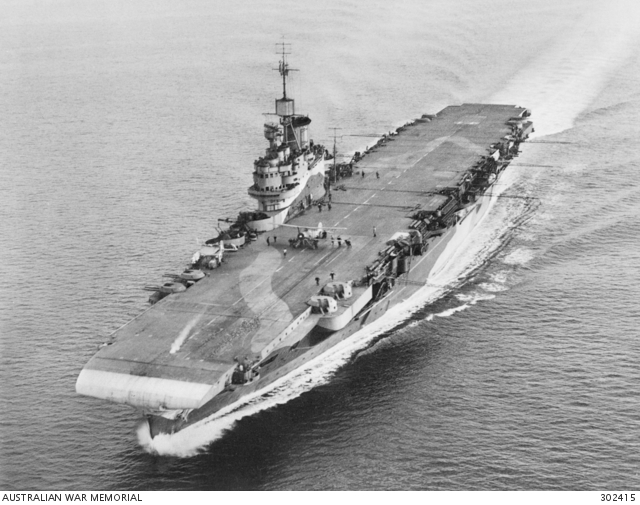
Illustrious in 1942 with a Fairey Swordfish on deck.

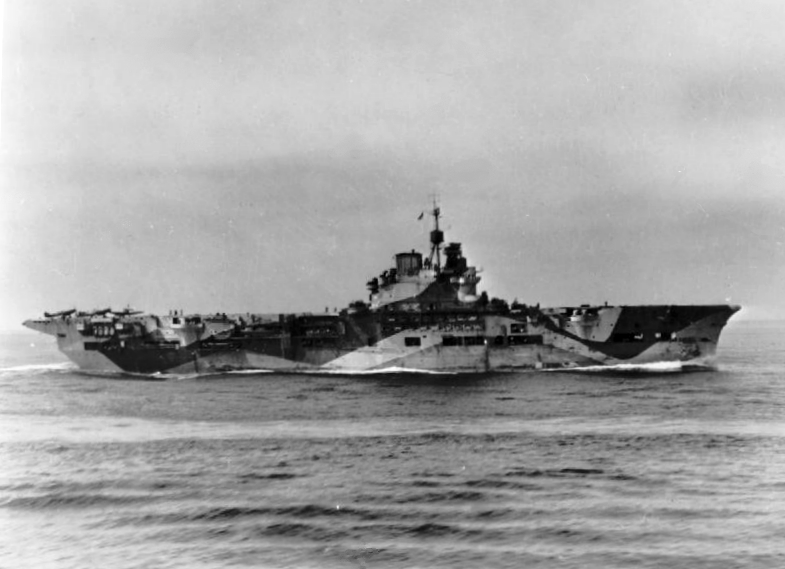
HMS Unicorn in the Atlantic 1943

- HMS Eagle (1918)
- Courageous-class aircraft carrier
- HMS Ark Royal (91)
- Illustrious-class aircraft carrier
- Implacable-class aircraft carrier

=== Light aircraft carriers ===
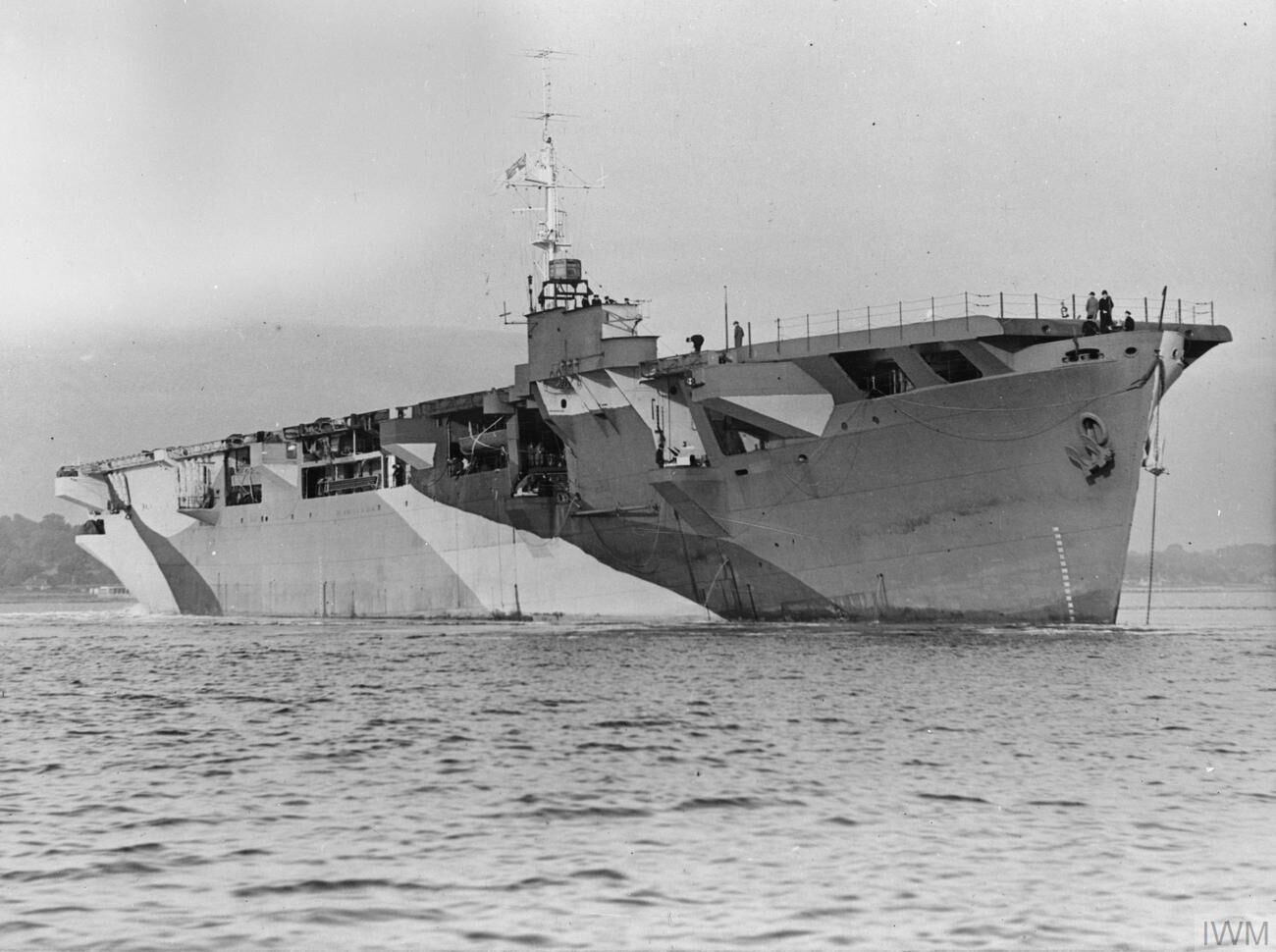
HMS Activity in the Firth of Forth

- HMS Argus (I49)
- HMS Hermes (95)
- HMS Unicorn (I72)
- 1942 Design Light Fleet Carrier

=== Escort carrier ===
- HMS Pretoria Castle (F61)
- HMS Audacity
- HMS Archer (D78)
- Avenger-class escort carrier
- Attacker-class escort carrier
- Ruler-class escort carrier
- HMS Activity (D94)
- Nairana-class escort carrier

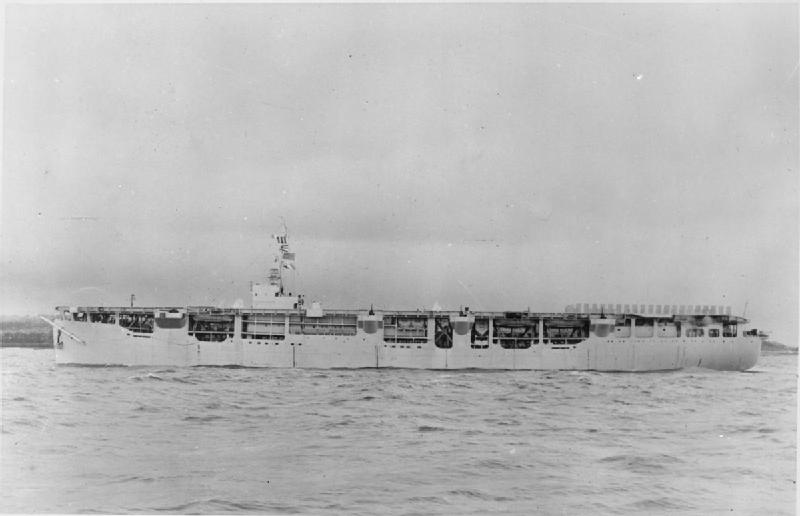
Merchant aircraft carrier Empire MacColl sometime between 1943-1945

=== Merchant aircraft carriers ===
- Merchant aircraft carriers (MAC) were grain ships or tankers with a flying deck mounted on top; they were operated by civilian crew with some naval personnel.

=== Seaplane carriers ===
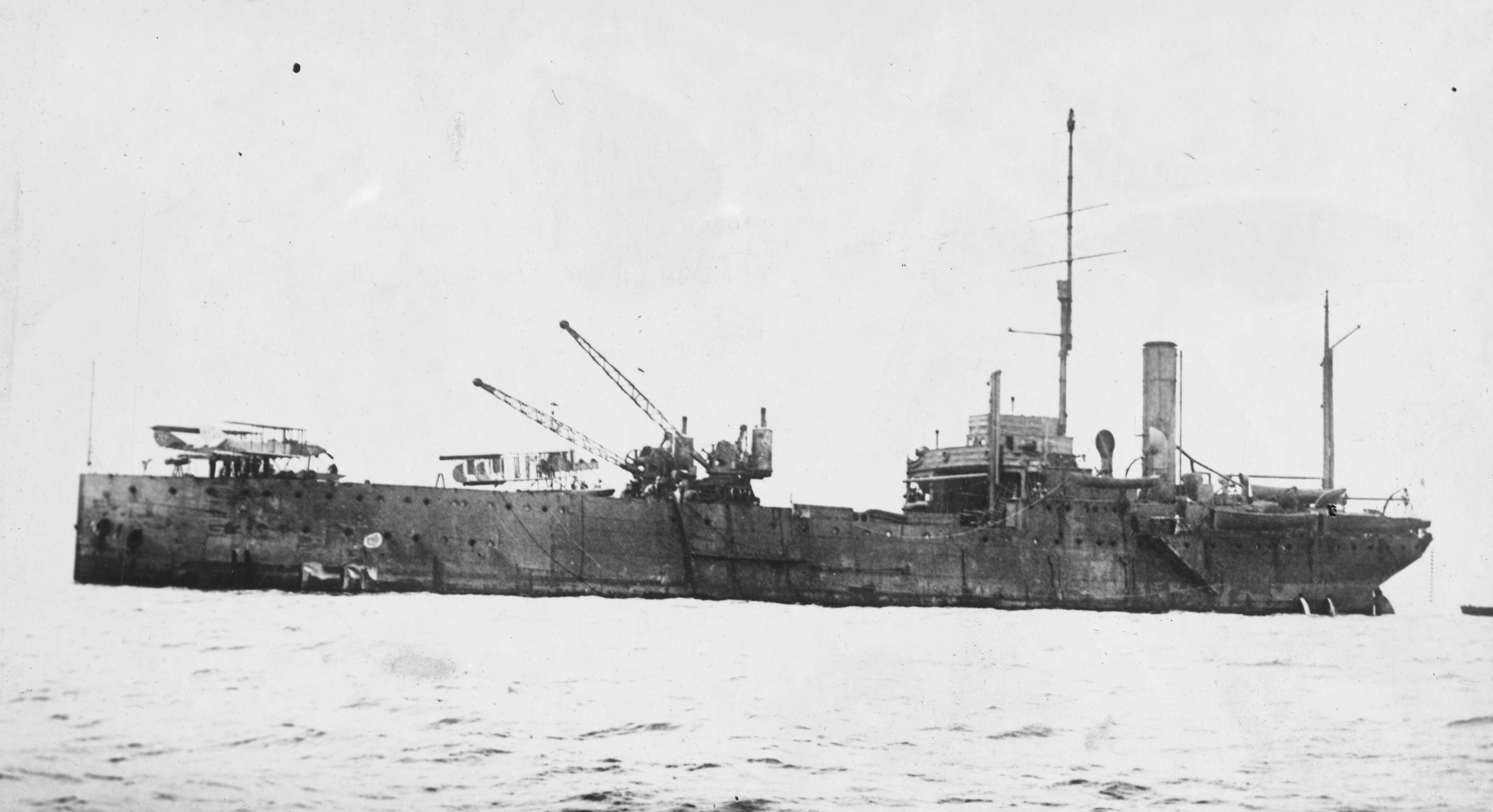
Pegasus in 1918 when it was called Ark Royal; it was renamed before World War II

- HMS Pegasus - used as training ship and aircraft transport
- HMS Albatross - ex-RAN, converted to "Landing Ship (Engineering)" to be repair ship for invasion of France

=== Catapult equipped ships ===
- Fighter catapult ship - convoy escorts fitted with a catapult to launch a fighter
- CAM ship - civilian ships equipped with a catapult to launch a fighter

== Battleships ==
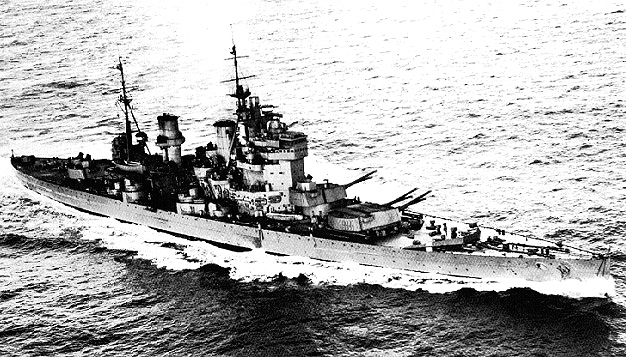
HMS King George V lead ship of class in 1941 and the most advanced British battleships of World War II

- Queen Elizabeth-class battleship
- Revenge-class battleship
- Iron Duke-class battleship
- King George V-class battleship (1911)
- Nelson-class battleship
- King George V-class battleship

== Battlecruisers ==
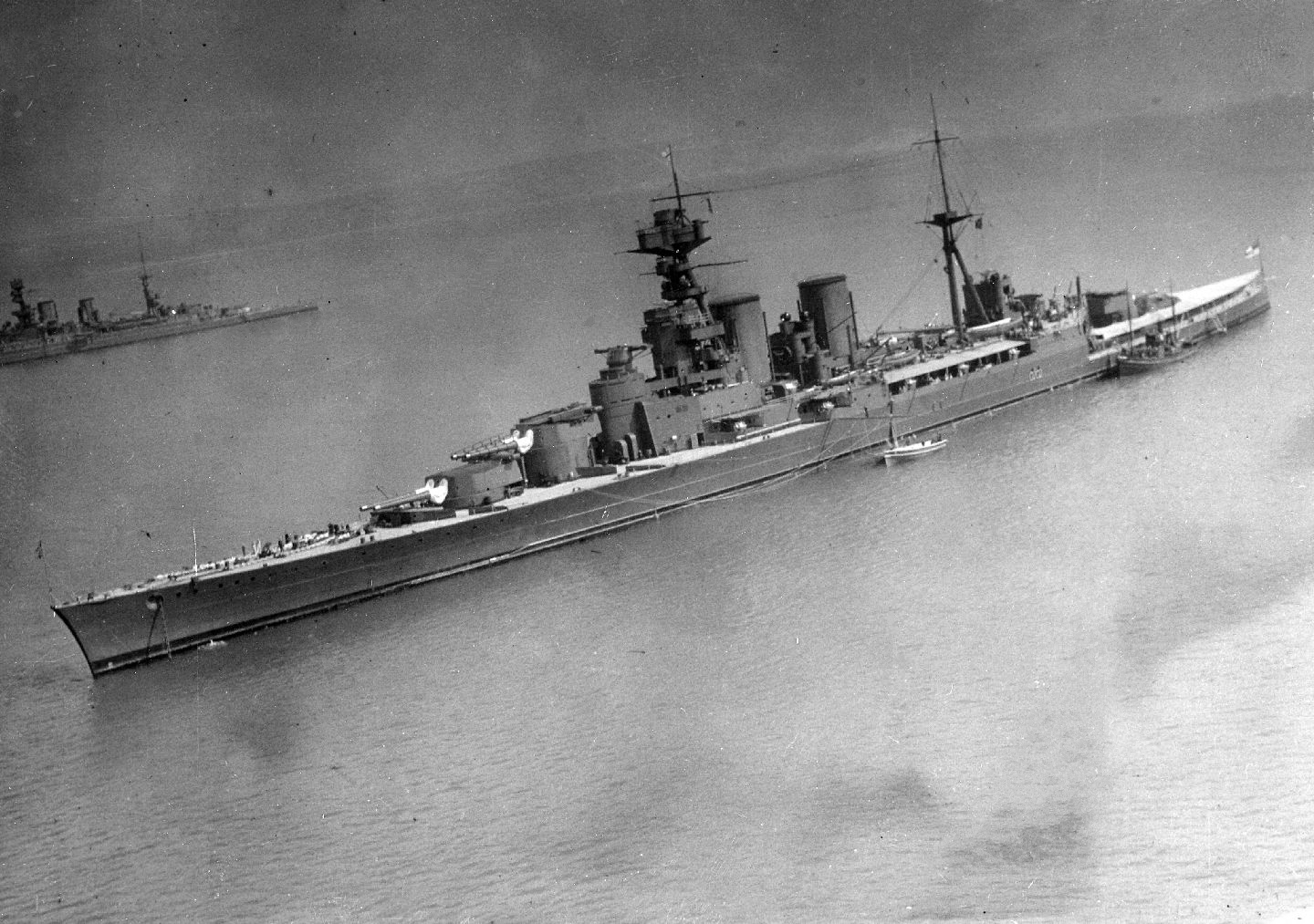
Hood was the only one of four planned Admiral-class battlecruisers built. The pride of the Royal Navy, it was sunk in the Battle of the Denmark Strait

- Courageous-class battlecruiser
- Renown-class battlecruiser
- HMS Hood

== Cruisers ==
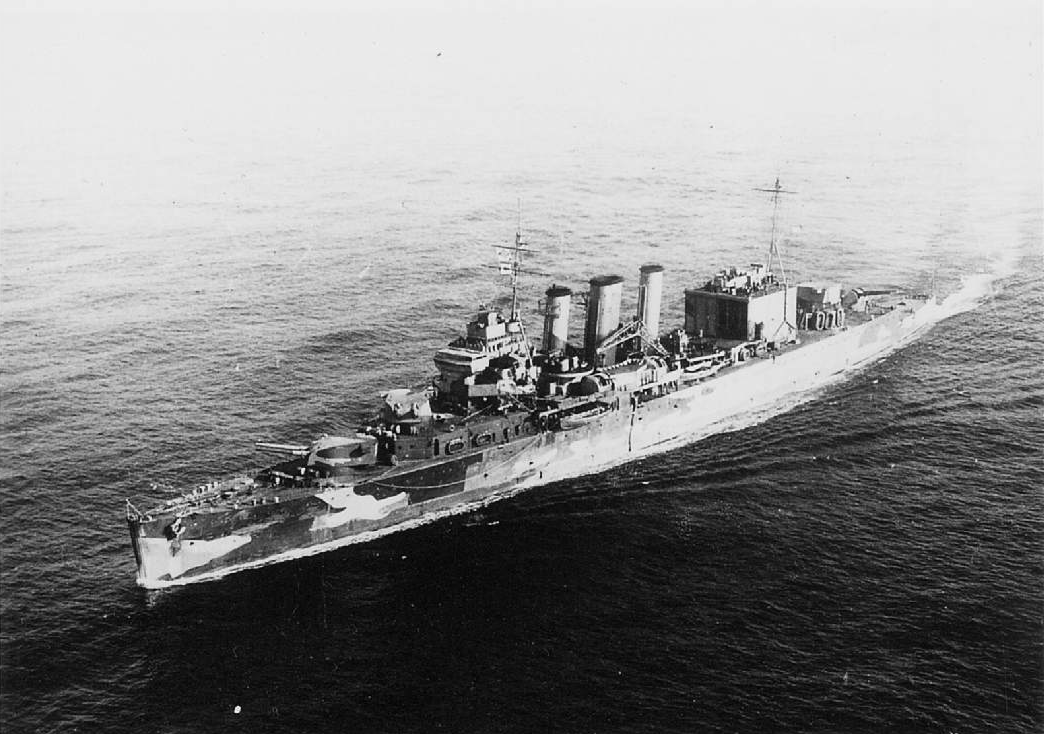
HMS Suffolk (55) was one of the Kent subclass of the County-class heavy cruisers

Heavy cruisers were defined by international agreement pre-war for the purposes of arms limitation as those with guns greater than 6-inch (152 mm); ships of guns of 6-inch or less were light cruisers.

=== Heavy cruisers ===
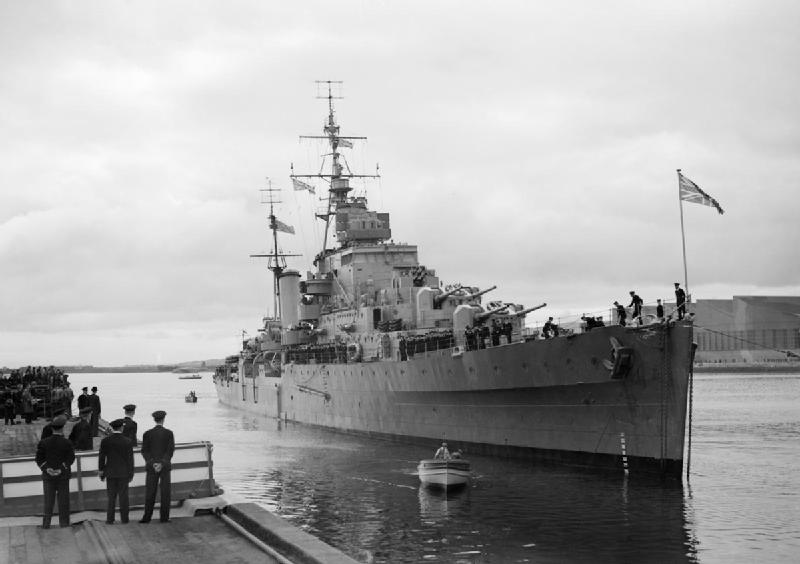
HMS Phoebe, a Dido-class cruiser with Princess Elizabeth and King George VI on board at Belfast.

- Hawkins-class cruiser
- County-class cruiser
- York-class cruiser

=== Light cruisers ===
- C-class cruiser
- Danae-class cruiser
- Emerald-class cruiser
- Leander-class cruiser
- Arethusa-class cruiser
- Town-class cruiser
- Dido-class cruiser
- Fiji-class cruiser
- Minotaur-class cruiser

=== Armed merchant cruisers ===
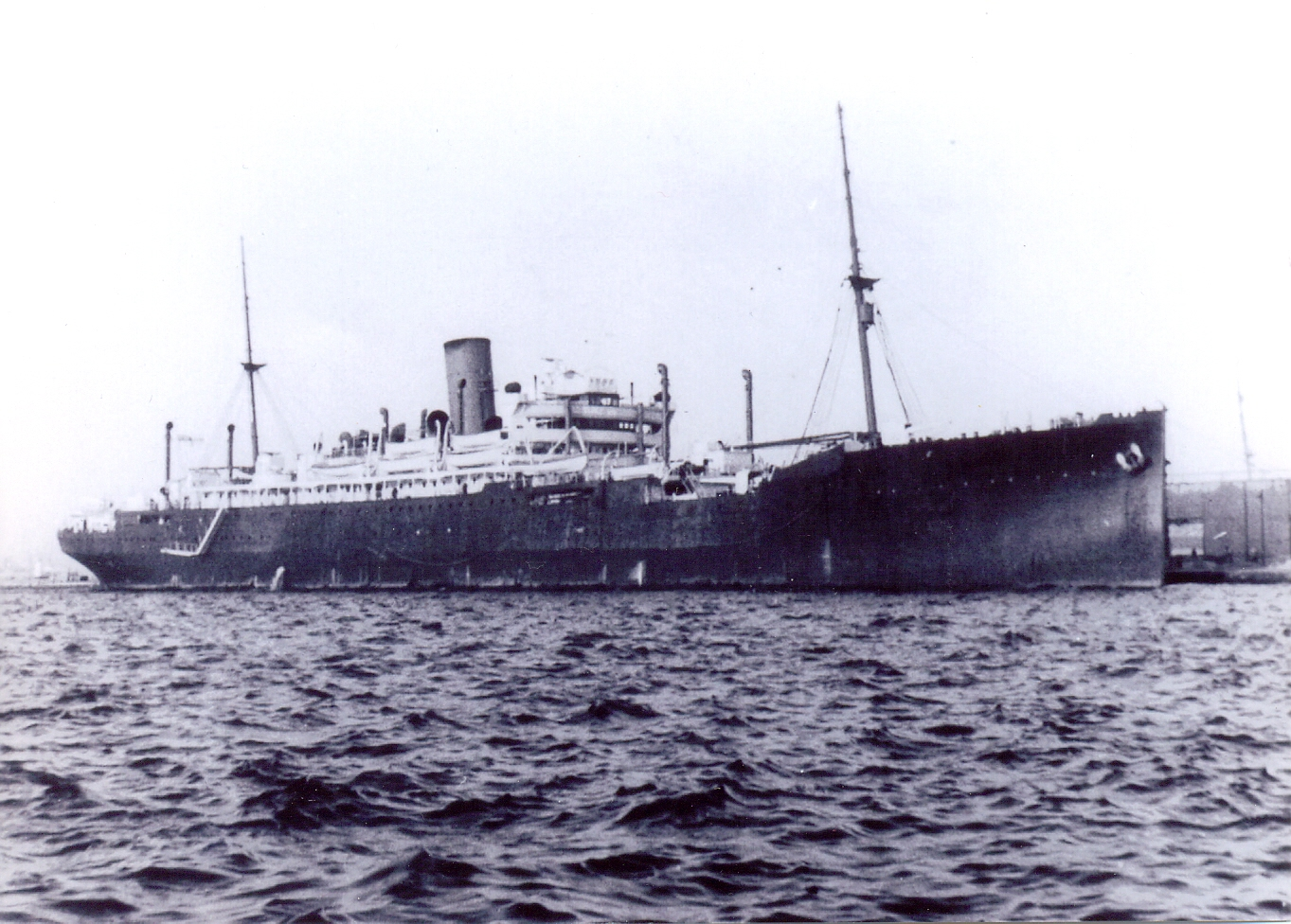
The armed merchant cruiser Jervis Bay in Dakar, Senegal in 1940

Armed merchant cruisers

== Monitors ==
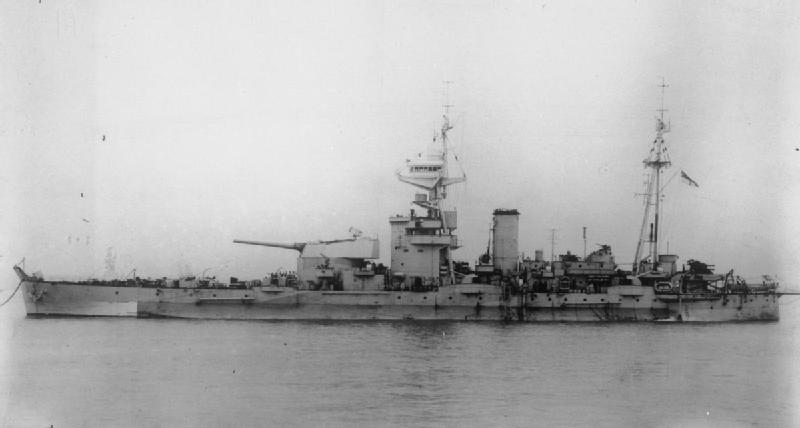
The Roberts-class monitor HMS Roberts.

- Erebus-class monitor
- Roberts-class monitor

== Destroyers ==
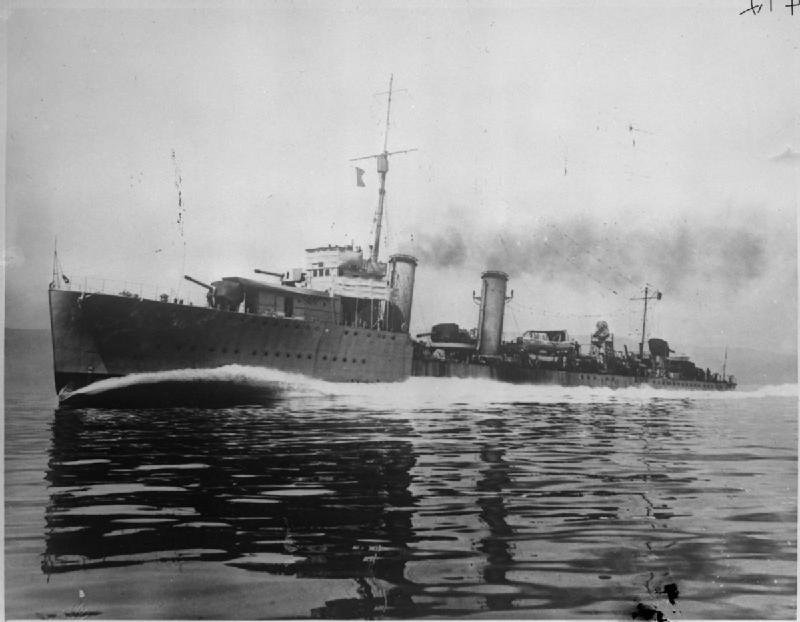
HMS Mackay, one of the Admiralty type destroyer leaders, and saw action in the Channel Dash

=== Destroyer leaders ===
- Thornycroft type destroyer leader
- Admiralty type flotilla leader

=== Destroyers ===
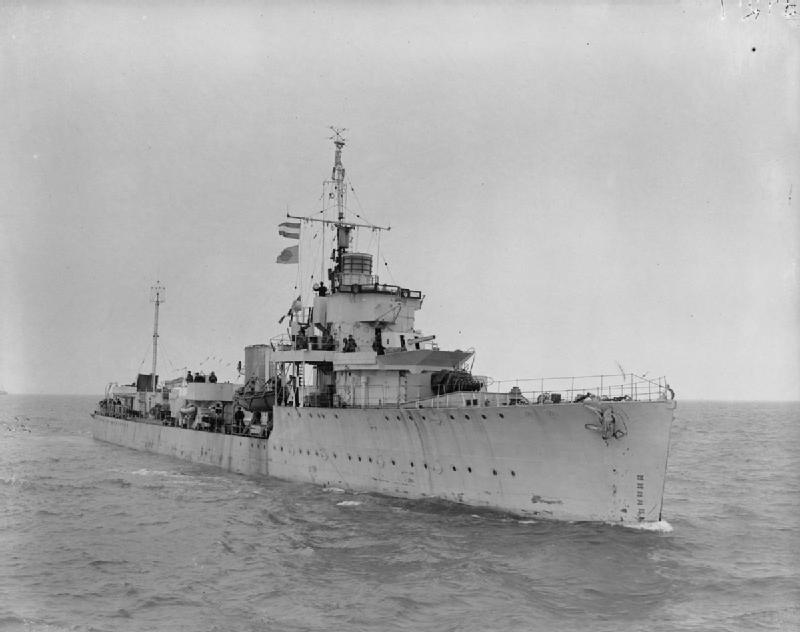
HMS Vanquisher one of the V-class destroyers which took part in evacuating troops from France in Operation Dynamo

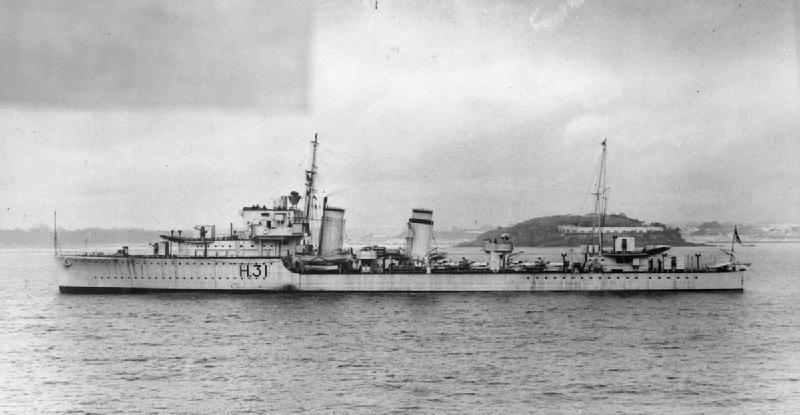
G-class destroyer HMS Griffin saw most of its notable action in the Battle of Cape Matapan and Operation Vigorous which was mainly around Africa and in the Mediterranean.

- R-class destroyer - HMS Skate only
- V and W-class destroyer
- S-class destroyer
- HMS Ambuscade (D38)
- HMS Amazon (D39)
- A- and B-class destroyer
- C and D-class destroyer
- E and F-class destroyer
- G and H-class destroyer
- I-class destroyer
- Tribal-class destroyer
- J-, K- and N-class destroyer
- L and M-class destroyer
- Hunt-class destroyer
- Town-class destroyer
- O and P-class destroyer
- Q and R-class destroyer
- S and T-class destroyer
- U and V-class destroyer
- W and Z-class destroyer
- C-class destroyer
- Battle-class destroyer
- Weapon-class destroyer

== Frigates ==
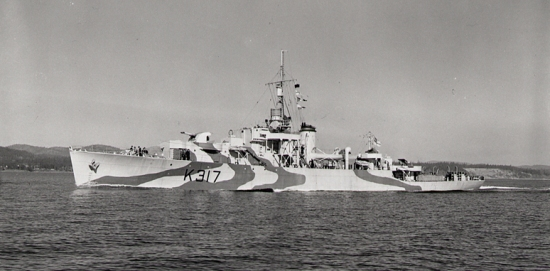
The Canadian Chebogue was one of over 150 River-class frigates built

- River-class frigate
- Captain-class frigate
- Colony-class frigate
- Loch-class frigate
- Bay-class frigate

== Corvettes ==
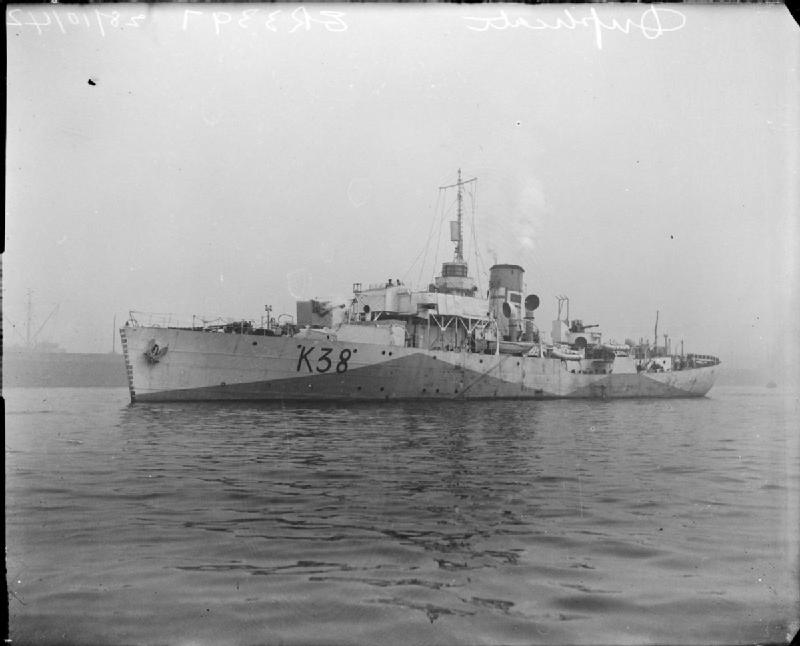
Flower-class Mignonette underway on the River Tyne

- Flower-class corvette
- Castle-class corvette

== Sloops ==
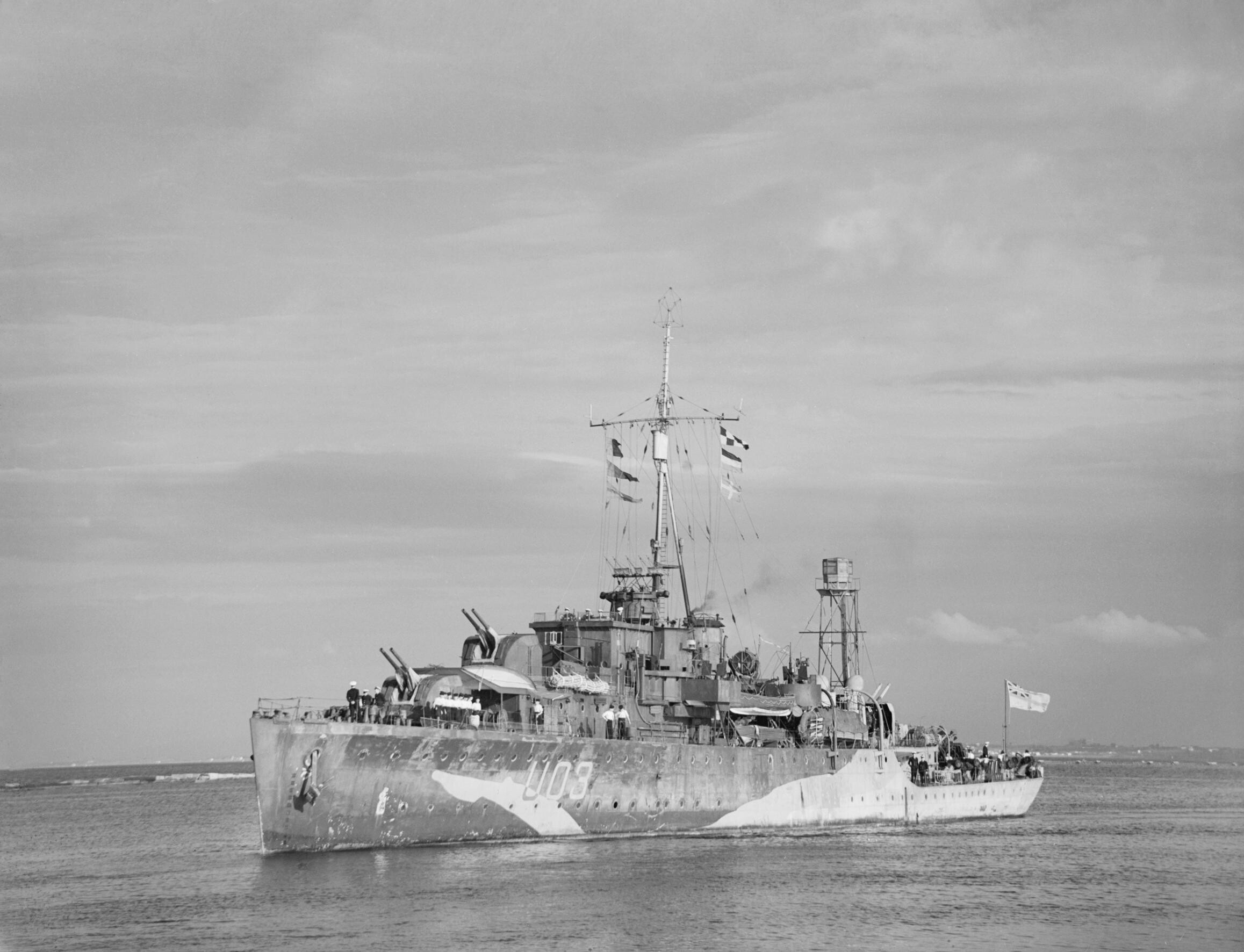
The Black Swan-class sloop HMS Erne arriving at Algiers as part of a troop convoy

- 24-class sloop
- Bridgewater-class sloop
- Hastings-class sloop
- Banff-class sloop
- Shoreham-class sloop
- Grimsby-class sloop^{1998}
- Kingfisher-class sloop
- Bittern-class sloop
- Egret-class sloop
- Black Swan-class sloop

== Minelayers ==
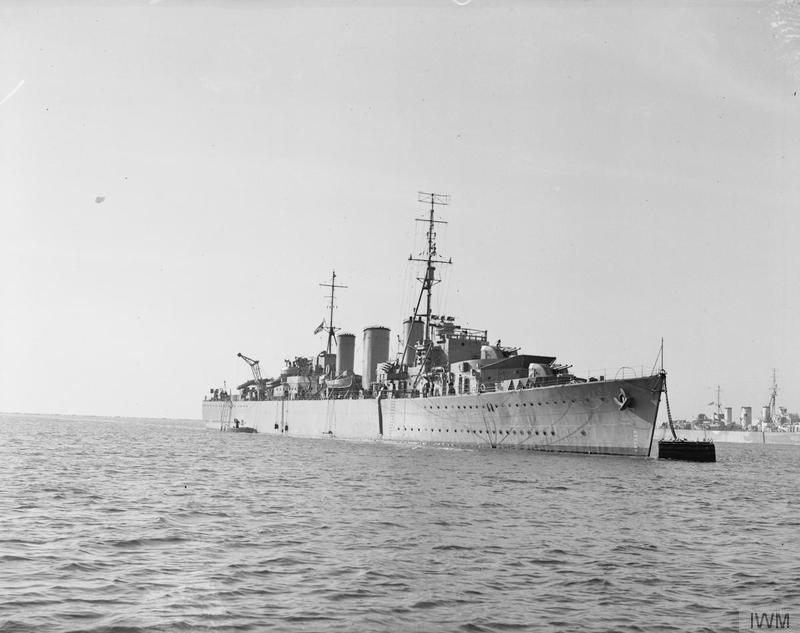
Abdiel-class minelayers Manxman and Welshman

- HMS Adventure (M23) - minelaying cruiser
- HMS Plover (M26)
- Linnet-class minelayer
- HMS Teviot Bank - auxiliary minelayer
- HMS Agamemnon (M10) - auxiliary minelayer
- HMS Menestheus - auxiliary minelayer
- HMS Port Quebec - auxiliary minelayer
- HMS Port Napier
- HMS Southern Prince - auxiliary minelayer
- Abdiel-class minelayer - also used as fast transports

== Minesweepers ==
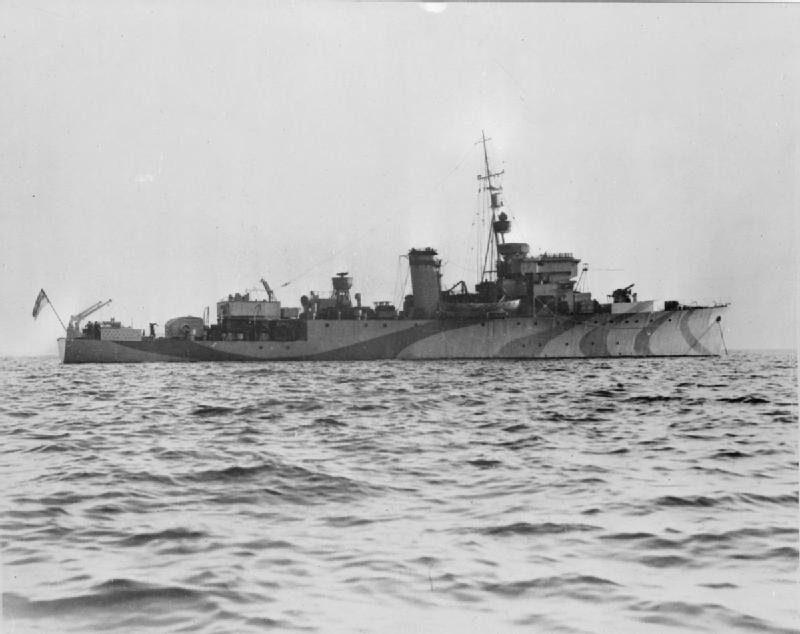
The Algerine-class minesweeper Hound used reciprocating steam engines rather than turbines

- Hunt-class minesweeper
- Halcyon-class minesweeper
- MMS-class minesweeper – MMS stands for motor minesweeper.
- Bangor-class minesweeper
- Algerine-class minesweeper
- Auk-class minesweeper – known as Catherine class in British service
- Cybele-class mine destructor vessel
- BYMS-class minesweeper

== Submarines ==
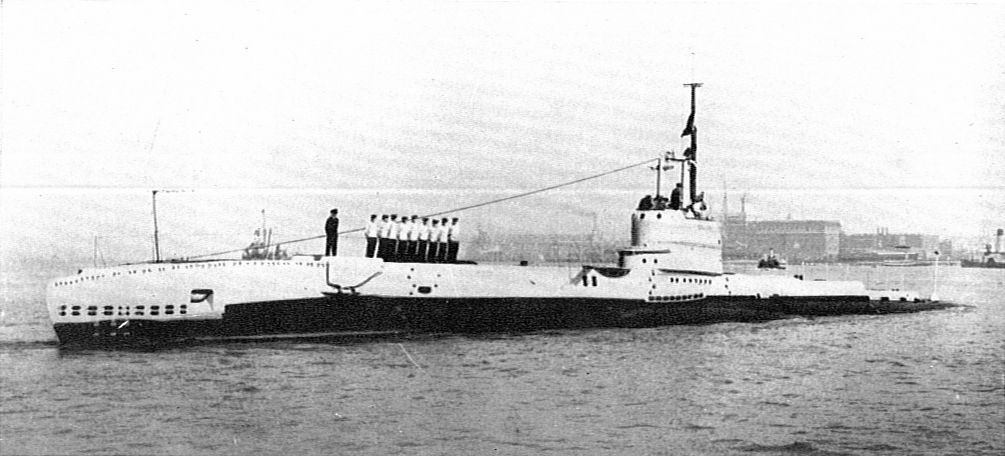
Sealion a pre-war S-class submarine.

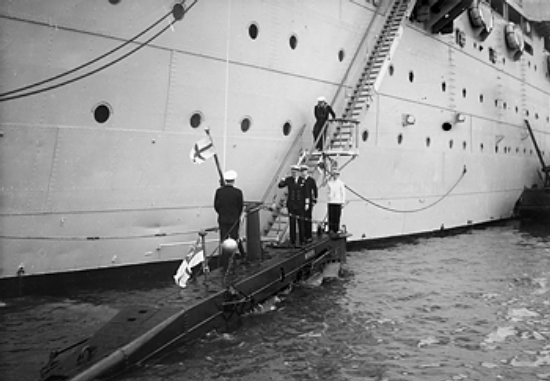
Admiral Sir John Eccles, Commander in Chief Home Fleet, boarding the X-craft Minnow at Portland.

- H-class submarine
- L-class submarine
- Odin-class submarine
- Parthian-class submarine
- Rainbow-class submarine
- S-class submarine
- River-class submarine (also known as the Thames class)
- Grampus-class submarine minelaying submarines
- T-class submarine (also known as the Triton class)
- U-class submarine
- P611-class submarine
- V-class submarine
- Amphion-class submarine

=== Midget submarines ===
- X-class submarine
- XE-class submarine

== Naval trawlers ==
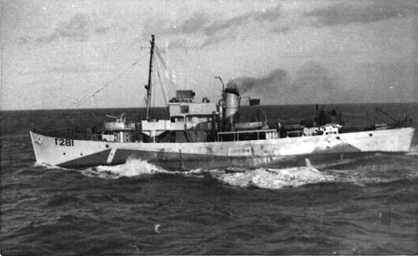
Isles-class trawler HMS Procher

- Mersey-class trawler
- Isles-class trawler
- Tree-class trawler
- Dance-class trawler
- Shakespearian-class trawler
- Round Table-class trawler

== Small armed boats ==
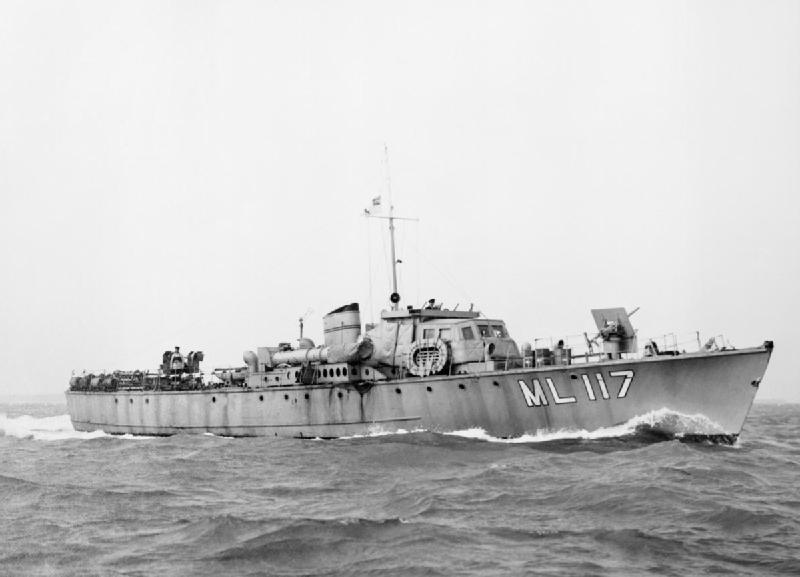
- Fairmile B motor launch ML 117 underway.
  Motor Launch
  - Fairmile A motor launch
  - Fairmile B motor launch
- Harbour Defence Motor Launch
- Motor torpedo boats
  - Vosper 73 ft motor torpedo boat
  - Fairmile D motor torpedo boat
- Motor gun boats
  - Fairmile C motor gun boat
- Steam Gun Boat
- High-speed launch
- High-speed launches type boats or HSL were operated only by the Royal Air Force Marine Branch to rescue downed RAF aircrew at sea
- Type Two 63 ft HSL

== Other ==
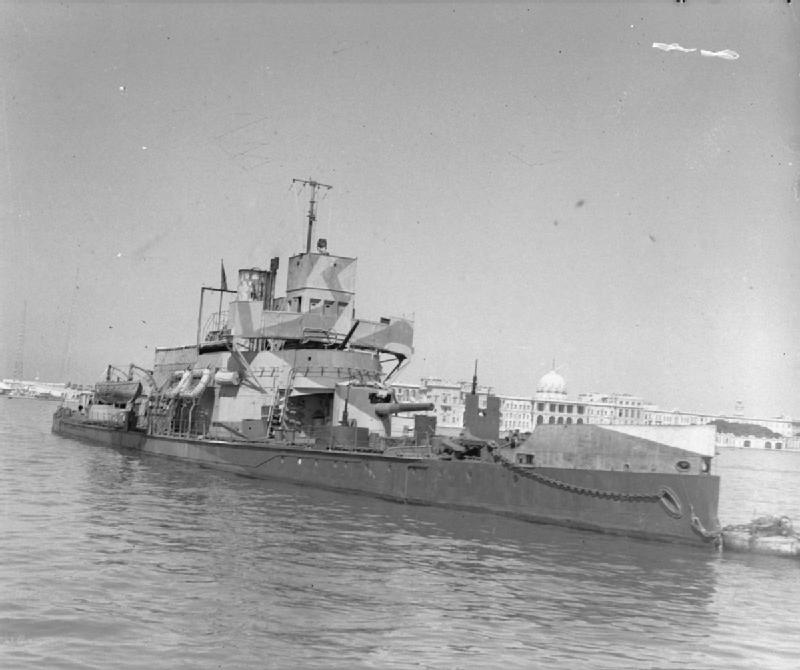
Insect-class gunboat HMS Aphis

- Ocean boarding vessels

=== Gunboats ===
- Insect-class gunboat
- Dragonfly-class river gunboat

=== Salvage vessels ===
- King Salvor-class salvage vessel

=== Repair and maintenance ships ===
- Beachy Head-class repair ship

=== Boom defence ===
- Bar-class boom defence vessel

== Tugs ==
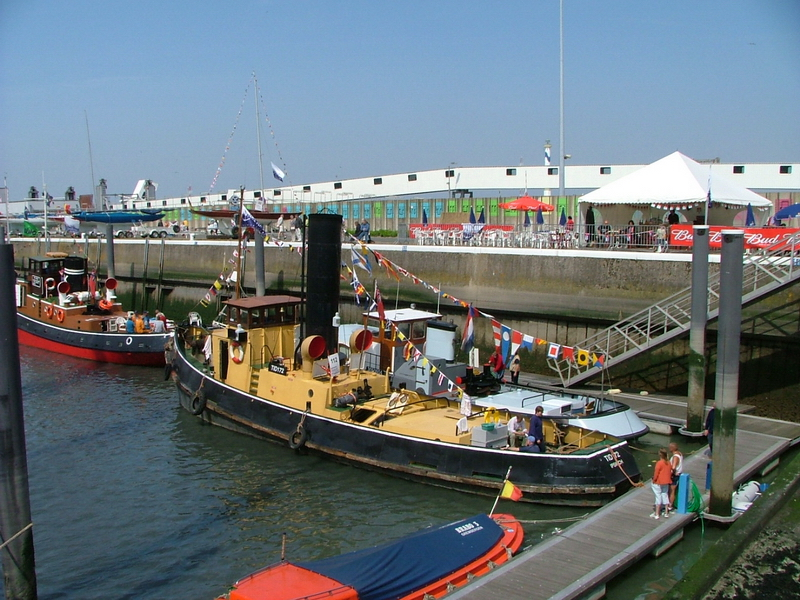
TID-class tug in Ostend, Belgium

Several classes of Admiralty tug were operated as well as other vessels obtained

- Rescue tugs operated by His Majesty's Rescue Tug Service and civilians through Ministry of War Transport
  - Saint
  - Rollicker
  - Brigand
  - Assurance
  - Favourite
  - Bustler
  - Nimble
  - Envoy
  - Director
- Harbour tugs, operated by Royal Maritime Auxiliary Service,
  - Robust
  - West
  - Alligator
- TID-class tug

== Auxiliary and merchant ships ==
=== General purpose ships ===
- Empire ship
  - Empire F coaster
  - Channel Tanker (CHANT)
  - Heavy lift ships
  - "Ocean"-type tanker
  - Norwegian-type tanker
  - Wave-class oiler
  - Three Island type cargo ship
  - Malta type cargo ship
  - Tank landing ships
  - Ocean going tugs
  - Convoy rescue ship
  - Empire Maple-class tug
- Ramped cargo lighter

=== Oilers and tankers ===
- Dale-class oiler
- Ranger-class tanker
- Sprite-class tanker
- Ol-class tanker
- War-class oiler
- Spa-class coastal water carriers
- Fresh-class water tank vessels

=== Stores ===
- Fort-class stores ship

== Amphibious warfare vessels ==
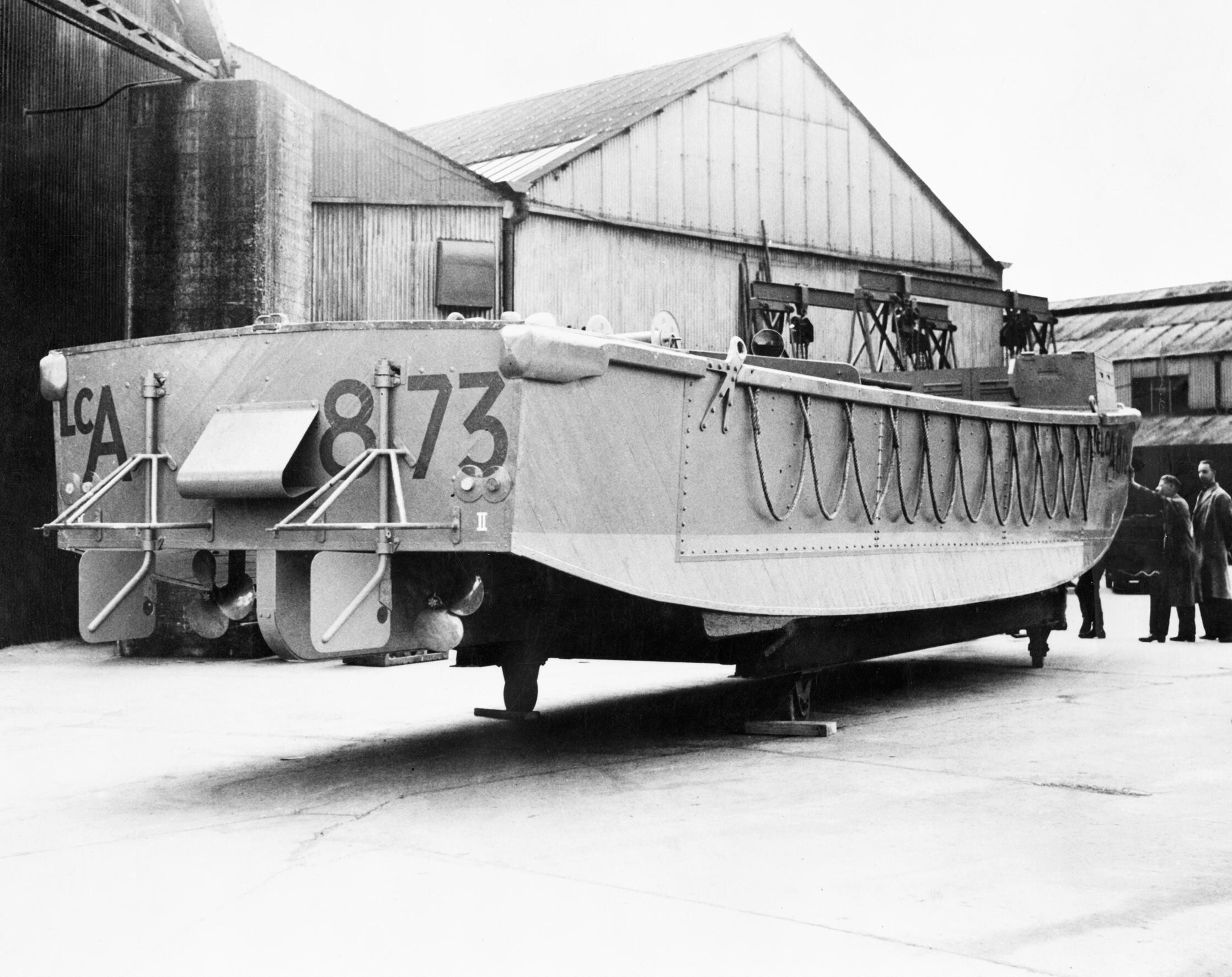
Newly made Landing Craft Assault (LCA) in 1942.

- Landing ship, infantry
- Landing Craft Assault
- Fairmile H landing craft
- LCPL
- LCM 1
- Landing Ship, Tank
  - Maracaibo-class tank landing ship
  - Boxer-class

Headquarters ships

- LST1 tank landing ship - later fighter direction ship
- Headquarters ship

== Civilian ships ==
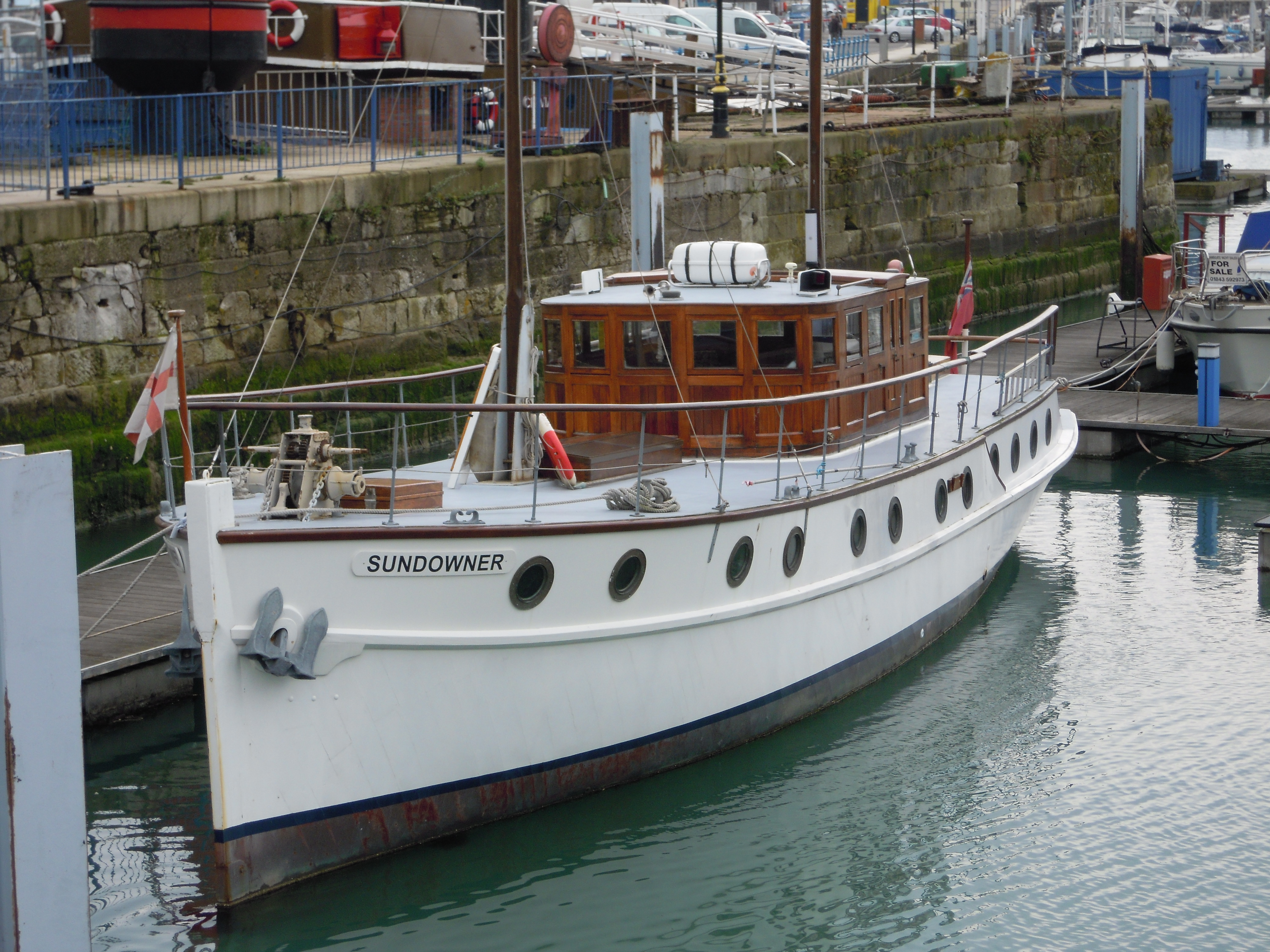
- The yacht Sundowner owned by Charles Lightoller which participated in the Dunkirk evacuation as a little ship.
  Little Ships of Dunkirk

== See also ==
- List of ship classes of World War II
