= Yewforest =

A number of ships were named Yewforest, including:

- SS Yewforest (1910), a British coaster in service 1926–42
- SS Yewforest (1945), a British coaster in service 1946–54
- MV Yewforest, a British coaster in service 1957–85
