= MV Stirlingshire =

A number of motor vessels have been named Stirlingshire, including –

- MV Stirlingshire (1928), a British cargo ship in service 1929–40
- MV Stirlingshire (1944), a British refrigerated cargo liner in service 1946–66.
