= Empire Maple-class tug =

Class overview
- Operators: Royal Navy; Royal Australian Navy

General characteristics
- Type: Tugboat
- Tonnage: 129 GRT
- Length: 95 ft 6 in (29.11 m)
- Beam: 20 ft 6 in (6.25 m)
- Depth: 8 ft 4 in (2.54 m)
- Propulsion: 500 ihp (373 kW) 3-cylinder triple expansion coal-fired steam engine

The Empire Maple class tug was a class of tug built for the Royal Navy and Royal Australian Navy during World War II.

== Royal Navy ==
- Empire Folk
- Empire Percy
- Empire Plane
- Empire Seraph

== Royal Australian Navy ==
- DST 931 Emu
- DST 932 Bronzewing
- DST 933 Mollymawk
