= MV Redgate =

History
- Name: Empire Freetown (1945–46); Inverness (1946–53); Redgate (1953–63); Agia Elpis (1963–68)
- Owner: Ministry of War Transport (1945); Ministry of Transport (1945–46); B J Sutherland & Co Ltd (1946–53); Turnball, Scott Shipping Co Ltd (1953–63); Compagnia Marvalia Navigazione SA (1963–67); Southern Cross Shipping Co Ltd (1967–68)
- Operator: T Dunlop & Sons (1945–46); B J Sutherland & Co Ltd (1946–53); Turnball, Scott & Co Ltd (1953–63); Compagnia Marvalia Navigazione SA (1963–68)
- Port of registry: Burntisland, United Kingdom (1945–53); (United Kingdom) London (1953–63); Panama City, Panama (1963–67); Famagusta, Cyprus (1967–68)
- Builder: Burntisland Shipbuilding Ltd
- Yard number: 288
- Launched: 29 January 1945
- Completed: March 1945
- Out of service: 1968
- Identification: United Kingdom Official Number 180350 (1945–63); Code Letters GCQL (1945–63)
- Fate: Scrapped

General characteristics
- Type: Cargo ship
- Tonnage: 7,131 GRT, 4,864 NRT
- Length: 427 ft 1 in (130.18 m) between perpendiculars; 448 ft 1 in (136.58 m) overall
- Beam: 57 ft 0 in (17.37 m)
- Draught: 37 ft 9 in (11.51 m)
- Depth: 35 ft 4 in (10.77 m)
- Installed power: Diesel engine, 516 nhp
- Propulsion: Single screw propeller

Redgate was a 7,131 GRT cargo ship which was built in 1945 as Empire Freetown by Burntisland Shipbuilding Co. Ltd., Burntisland, Fife, United Kingdom for the Ministry of War Transport (MoWT). She was sold to B J Sutherland & Co. Ltd. in 1946 and was renamed Inverness. She was sold to Turbull, Scott & Co. Ltd. in 1957 and renamed Redgate. She was sold to Compagnia Marvalia Navigazione SA, Monrovia, Liberia in 1963 and was renamed Agia Elpis. She was sold to Southern Cross Shipping Co. Ltd., Cyprus in 1967 and was scrapped in Shanghai, China in 1968.

== Description ==
The ship was 427 ft 1 in (130.18 m) long between perpendiculars (448 ft 1 in (137 m) overall), with a beam of 57 feet 0 inches (17.37 m). She had a depth of 35 feet 4 inches (10.77 m) and a draught of 37 feet 9 inches (11.51 m). She was assessed at 7,131 GRT, 4,864 NRT,

The ship was propelled by a two-stroke Single Cycle, Single Action diesel engine, which had three cylinders of 23 5/8 inches (60 cm) diameter by 91 5/16 inches (232 cm) stroke driving a single screw propeller. The engines was built by William Doxford & Sons Ltd., Sunderland, County Durham. It was rated at 516 nhp.

== History ==
Empire Freetown was built in 1945 as yard number 288 by Burntisland Shipbuilding Co. Ltd., Burntisland, Fife for the Ministry of War Transport (MoWT). She was launched on 29 January 1945 and completed in March. Her port of registry was Burntisland. The United Kingdom Official Number 180350 and Code Letters GCQL were allocated. She was initially operated under the management of T. Dunlop and Sons

Empire Freetown departed from Methil, Fife on 29 March 1945 as part of Convoy FS 1771, which arrived at Southend-on-Sea, Essex on 31 March. She then joined Convoy ON 294, which sailed the next day and arrived at New York, United States on 20 April. She sailed on 17 May to join Convoy UGS 93, which departed from the Hampton Roads, Virginia on 18 May and arrived at Oran, Algeria on 4 June. She suffered an onboard fire and returned to New York on 18 May. She then joined Convoy UGS 94, which departed from the Hampton Roads on 23 May and arrived at Gibraltar on 7 June. Empire Freetown left Gibraltar that day and sailed to Alexandria, Egypt, where she arrived on 16 June. She then sailed to Suez and Aden, arriving and departing on 22 June for Calcutta, India, where she arrived on 6 July. She sailed on 23 July for Bombay, India, arriving on 1 August. Empire Freetown departed from Bombay on 4 September for Durban, South Africa, where she arrived on 18 September. She sailed on 7 October for Santos, São Paulo, Brazil, arriving on 24 October. She departed on 1 November for Trinidad, where she arrived on 13 November. Empire Freetown sailed on 18 November for Júcaro, Cuba, arriving four days later. She sailed on 3 December and arrived at London, United Kingdom on 25 December.

In 1946, Empire Freetown was sold to B J Sutherland & Co Ltd, Newcastle upon Tyne, Northumberland and was renamed Inverness. Her identification and port of registry remained unchanged. In 1953, Inverness was sold to Turnbull, Scott Shipping Co. Ltd, London and was renamed Redgate. She was operated under the management of Turbull, Scott & Co. Ltd.

In 1963, Redgate was sold to Compagnia Marvalia Naviera SA, Monrovia, Liberia. She was renamed Agia Elpis and reflagged to Panama. She was sold to the Southern Cross Shipping Co. Ltd., Cyprus in 1967 and placed under the management of Poseidon Shipping Agencies, Famagusta. She was sold in 1968 to the China Machinery Import-Export Corporation, Shanghai, China for scrapping. She arrived at Shanghai on 30 July 1968.
