= SS Admiral Hardy =

Hansa A type cargo ship

History
- Name: Michael Ferdinand (1944–45); Empire Farrar (1945–49); Admiral Hardy (1949–55); Dumai Trader (1955–67)
- Owner: Hugo Ferdinand Dampschiffs Reederi (1944–45); Ministry of War Transport (1945); Ministry of Transport (1945–47); Stratton Steamship Co Ltd (1947–49); Stanley Steamship Co (1949–55); Sig S Årstads Rederi A/S (1955–65); Scanship Corporation (1965–67)
- Operator: Hugo Ferdinand Dampschiffs Reederi (1944–45); Indo-China Steam Navigation Corporation (1945–47); Stratton Steamship Co Ltd (1947–49); Stanley Steamship Co (1949–55); A/S Victor Müller Rederi (1955–65); Panama Sea Express Line (1965–67); Manchester Navigation Ltd (1967)
- Port of registry: Rostock, Germany (1944–45); London, United Kingdom (1945–49); Hong Kong (1949–55); Bergen, Norway (1955–65); Panama (1965–67)
- Builder: Stettiner Oderwerke
- Cost: ℛℳ1,700,000
- Yard number: 851
- Launched: 26 May 1944
- Completed: July 1944
- Identification: United Kingdom Official Number 180444 (1945–49); Code Letters GDQG (1945–49); Code Letters LAJQ (1955–65)
- Fate: Scrapped, 1967

General characteristics
- Class & type: Hansa A type cargo ship
- Tonnage: 1,929 GRT; 935 NRT; 3,120 DWT
- Length: 301 feet 3 inches (91.82 m) (o/a); 279 ft 7 in (85.22 m) (p/p)
- Beam: 44 ft 3 in (13.49 m)
- Draught: 18 ft 5 in (5.61 m)
- Depth: 18 ft 8 in (5.69 m)
- Installed power: 1,400 hp (1,000 kW)
- Propulsion: Steam engine, Single screw propeller
- Speed: 11 knots (20 km/h; 13 mph)

Admiral Hardy was a 1,929 GRT Hansa A type cargo ship that was built in 1944 by Stettiner Oderwerke, Stettin, Germany as Michael Ferdinand for Hugo Ferdinand Dampschiffs Reederi. She was seized in 1945 as a war prize and taken over by the Ministry of War Transport (MoWT) as Empire Farrar. In 1949, she was sold to Hong Kong and renamed Admiral Hardy. She was sold to Norway in 1955. In 1965, she was sold to Panama and renamed Dumai Trader, serving until 1967 when she was scrapped.

== Description ==
The ship was a Hansa A type cargo ship built in 1944 by Stettiner Oderwerke, Stettin, Germany. She was yard number 851.

The ship was 301 feet 3 inches (91.82 m) long overall (279 feet 7 inches (85.22 m) between perpendiculars), with a beam of 44 feet 3 inches (13.49 m). She had a depth of 18 feet 8 inches (5.69 m) and a draught of 18 feet 5 inches (5.61 m). She was assessed at 1,929 GRT, 935 NRT, 3,120 DWT. The ship was propelled by a 1,400 horsepower (1,000 kW) steam engine. She could make 11 knots (20 km/h).

== History ==
Michael Ferdinand was built at a cost of approximately ℛℳ1,700,000 by Stettiner Oderwerke, Stettin, Germany. She was launched on 26 May 1944 and completed in July 1944. She was built for Hugo Ferdinand Dampschiffs Reederei, Rostock.

Following her participation in the evacuation of east Germany at the end of World War II, Michael Ferdinand was at Sønderborg, Denmark in May 1945. She was seized by the Allies as a war prize, passed to the MOWT and renamed Empire Farrar. She was placed under the management of the Indo-China Steam Navigation Co Ltd. The United Kingdom Official Number 180644 and Code Letters GDQG were allocated. Her port of registry was London. In 1947, management passed to the Stratton Steamship Co Ltd.

In 1949, Empire Farrar was sold to the Stanley Steamship Co Ltd, Hong Kong and was named Admiral Hardy. On 29 July 1953, Admiral Hardy was fired on by a Chinese Navy warship whilst leaving Fuzhou. She was subsequently boarded by a party from the ship. Her cargo of timber was seized by Chinese Nationalists. In September, her captain fell overboard and was drowned whilst the ship was off Wenzhou, China during a voyage from Fuzhou to Qingdao, China. On 8 October, she was stopped in the Straits of Formosa by an unidentified gunboat but was allowed to continue her voyage. On 13 November 1954, four Chinese crew members were detained and interrogated by police whilst the ship was at Shanghai over a missing Chinese crew member. Her captain was told by the Chinese police that as captain of the ship he was held responsible for the death of the crew member. He considered this as intimidation by the Chinese authorities. He and his four officers resigned their posts upon the ship returning to Kobe, Japan.

In November 1955, Admiral Hardy was sold to Sig S Årstads Rederi, Bergen, Norway for £115,000. She was placed under the management of Victor Müller Rederi AS. The Code Letters LAJQ were allocated. On 9 August 1964, Admiral Hardy ran aground on Arena Island (9°14′00″N 12°0′45″E) whilst on a voyage from North Borneo to Shanghai, China. She had been refloated by 15 August.

In October 1965, Admiral Hardy was sold for £67,500 to the Scanship Corporation, Panama and was renamed Dumai Trader. She was placed under the management of the Panama Sea Express Line, Norway. Management passed to Manchester Navigation Ltd, Panama in 1967. She was scrapped in March 1967 at Kaohsiung, Taiwan, and removed from Lloyd's Register in 1971.
