= MV Lizzonia =

British cargo ship (1944–1961)

Coordinates: 50°57′N 1°07′E

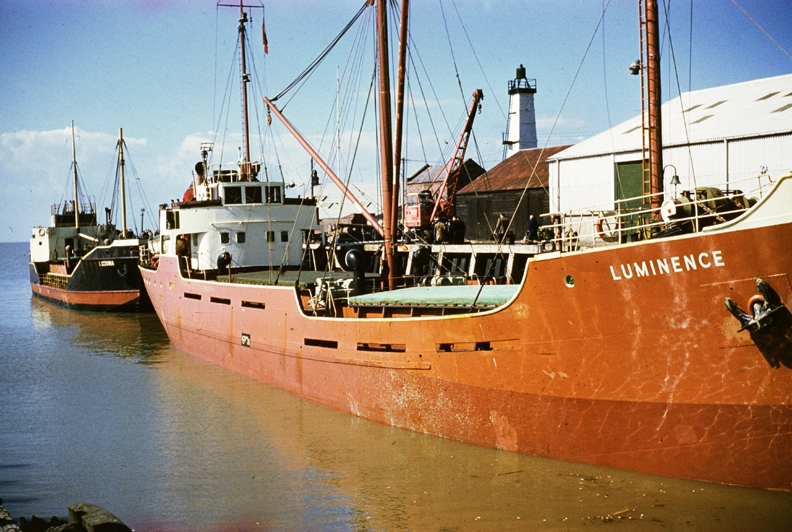
- Lizzonia (left) and Luminence (right) at Whitstable, Kent in 1961.

History
- Name: CHANT 35 (1944); Fabric 35 (1944); Empire Farouche (1944–46); Lizzonia (1946–61)
- Owner: Ministry of War Transport (1944–45); Ministry of Transport (1945–46); J Wharton (Shipping) Ltd (1946–61)
- Operator: J Wharton (Shipping) Ltd
- Port of registry: Goole, United Kingdom
- Builder: Goole Shipbuilding & Repairing Ltd
- Launched: 19 September 1944
- Completed: October 1944
- Out of service: 16 March 1961
- Identification: United Kingdom Official Number 180129 (1943–45); Code Letters MLZY
- Fate: Sank after collision

General characteristics
- Class & type: Empire F type coaster
- Tonnage: 410 GRT; 190 NRT; 430 DWT
- Length: 142 ft 2 in (43.33 m)
- Beam: 27 ft 0 in (8.23 m)
- Draught: 8 ft 5 in (2.57 m)
- Propulsion: Diesel engine, Single screw propeller

Lizzonia was a 401 GRT Empire F type coaster that was built in 1944 by Goole Shipbuilding & Repairing Ltd, Goole, United Kingdom as Empire Farouche for the Ministry of War Transport (MoWT). In 1946, she was sold and renamed Lizzonia. She was re-engined in 1956 and sank in 1961 following a collision with another vessel.

== Description ==
The ship was built in 1944 by Goole Shipbuilding & Repairing Ltd, Goole, East Riding of Yorkshire. She was yard number 3.

The ship was 142 feet 2 inches (43.33 m) long, with a beam of 27 feet 0 inches (8.23 m). She had a draught of 8 feet 5 inches (2.57 m). She was assessed at 410 GRT, 190 NRT, 430DWT.

As built, the ship was propelled by a four-stroke Single Cycle, Single Action diesel engine, which had seven cylinders of 8¾ inches (22 cm) diameter by 11½ inches (30 cm) stroke driving a screw propeller. The engine was built by Blackstone & Co, Stamford, Lincolnshire.

== History ==
Empire Farouche was laid down by Goole Shipbuilding & Repairing Ltd, Goole, Yorkshire as CHANT 35 and was renamed Fabric 35 whilst under construction. She was launched as Empire Farouche on 19 September 1944 and completed in October 1944. The Code Letters MLZY and United Kingdom Official Number 180125 were allocated. Her port of registry was Goole. She was operated under the management of J Wharton (Shipping) Ltd.

Empire Farouche was built for the MoWT and was placed under the management of J Wharton (Shipping) Ltd. In 1946, she was sold to her managers and renamed Lizzonia. A new diesel engine was fitted in 1956. On 16 March 1961, during foggy weather, Lizzonia was in collision with the Swedish cargo ship Arctic Ocean in the English Channel, 3 nautical miles (5.6 km) west north west of the Varne Lightvessel. Her crew was able to transfer to Arctic Ocean whilst the two ships were locked together. Lizzonia subsequently sank.
