= SS Chaksang =

Cargo ship

History
- Name: Weserbrück (1944–45); Empire Franklin (1945–47); Chaksang (1947–50)
- Owner: Norddeutscher Lloyd (1944–45); Ministry of War Transport (1945–46); Ministry of Transport (1946–47); Indo-China Steam Navigation Co Ltd (1947–50)
- Operator: Indo-China Steam Navigation Co Ltd (1946–49)
- Port of registry: London, United Kingdom (1946–50)
- Builder: Deutsche Werft
- Yard number: 587
- Launched: 1944
- Completed: 1946
- Out of service: 7 September 1949
- Identification: United Kingdom Official Number 180843 (1945–50); Code Letters GDPV (1945–50)
- Fate: Scrapped

General characteristics
- Class & type: Hansa A type cargo ship
- Tonnage: 1,923 GRT
- Length: 85.85 m (281 ft 8 in)
- Beam: 13.51 m (44 ft 4 in)
- Depth: 4.80 m (15 ft 9 in)
- Installed power: Compound steam engine
- Propulsion: Single screw propeller
- Speed: 10 knots (19 km/h)
- Crew: 66

Chaksang was a 1,923 GRT Hansa A type cargo ship which was built in 1944 as Weserbrück by Deutsche Werft, Hamburg, Germany for Norddeutscher Lloyd. She was seized by the Allies in an incomplete state in 1945 and completed as Empire Fraser for the Ministry of War Transport (MoWT). She was sold in 1946 to the Indo-China Steam Navigation Co Ltd and renamed Chaksang. Suffering an on-board explosion and fire in September 1949, she sank at Hong Kong. She was subsequently raised and scrapped in 1950.

== Description ==
The ship was 85.85 m (281 ft 8 in) long, with a beam of 13.51 m (44 ft 4 in). She had a depth of 4.80 m (15 ft 9 in). She was assessed at 1,923 GRT.

The ship was powered by a two-cylinder compound steam engine driving a single screw propeller. It could propel her at 10 knots (19 km/h).

== History ==
Weserbrück was built in 1944 as yard number 587 by Deutsche Werft, Hamburg for Norddeutscher Lloyd. She was seized in 1945 in an incomplete state at Hamburg and was completed as Empire Fraser for the Ministry of War Transport (MoWT). Her port of registry was London. The United Kingdom Official Number 180843 and Code Letters GDPV were allocated. She was operated under the management of the Indo-China Steam Navigation Co Ltd.

In November 1946, Empire Fraser transported a cargo of raw silk from Tokyo, Japan to the United Kingdom. This was the first silk imported into the United Kingdom after the end of the Second World War. Empire Fraser was sold to the Indo-China Steam Navigation Co Ltd in 1947 and was renamed Chaksang. On 7 September 1949, there was an onboard explosion and fire whilst the ship was moored at Hong Kong. No. 1 and No. 2 holds were affected, with flames reported to be 300 feet (91 m) high. Thirteen of her 66 crew were killed. She sank the next day. The ship had been delayed from sailing to Tianjin due to Typhoon Nelly and the cause of the explosion was sabotage. The ship was refloated on 22 March 1950. She was declared a constructive total loss and scrapped at Hong Kong.
