= SS Yewforest (1945) =

Ship built in 1945

History
- Name: Empire Fenchurch (1945–46); Yewforest (1946–54); Perelle (1954–62)
- Owner: Ministry of Transport (1945–46); John Stewart & Co (Shipping) Ltd (1946–54) O Dorey & Sons Ltd (1954–61)
- Operator: John Stewart & Co (Shipping) Ltd (1946–54) O Dorey & Sons Ltd (1954–61)
- Port of registry: Aberdeen, United Kingdom (1945–54); (United Kingdom) Guernsey, Channel Islands (1954–61)
- Builder: John Lewis & Sons Ltd
- Yard number: 187
- Launched: 6 November 1945
- Completed: February 1946
- Identification: United Kingdom Official Number 180995; Code Letters GKQF
- Fate: Converted to barge 1962
- Status: In service as of 1965

General characteristics
- Class & type: Coaster
- Tonnage: 1,047 GRT; 683 NRT
- Length: 205 feet 0 inches (62.48 m)
- Beam: 32 ft 8 in (9.96 m)
- Depth: 13 ft 7 in (4.14 m)
- Propulsion: Triple expansion steam engine, single screw propeller

Yewforest was a 1,047 GRT coaster that was built as Empire Fenchurch in 1945 by John Lewis & Sons Ltd, Aberdeen for the Ministry of Transport (MoT). She was sold in 1946 and renamed Yewforest. She was sold to Guernsey in 1954 and renamed Perelle. Sold for scrapping in 1961, she was converted to a barge in 1962 and was in service as Tor in 1965.

== Description ==
The ship was a coaster built in 1945 by John Lewi & Sons Ltd, Aberdeen, United Kingdom. She was yard number 187.

The ship was 205 feet 0 inches (62.48 m) long, with a beam of 32 feet 8 inches (9.96 m). She had a depth of 13 feet 7 inches (4.14 m). She was assessed at 1,047 GRT, 683 NRT,

The ship was propelled by a triple expansion steam engine, which had cylinders of 14 inches (36 cm), 24 inches (61 cm) and 40 inches (100 cm) diameter by 27 inches (69 cm) stroke. The engine was built by John Lewis & Sons Ltd. It drove a single screw propeller.

== History ==
The ship was built by John Lewis & Sons Ltd, Aberdeen, United Kingdom. She was launched on 6 November 1945 and completed in February 1946. Built for the MoT, she was placed under the management of John Stewart & Co (Shipping) Ltd. The United Kingdom Official Number 180995 and Code Letters GKQF were allocated. Her port of registry was Aberdeen.

Empire Fenchurch was sold in 1946 to John Stewart & Co (Shipping) Ltd. In 1954, Yewforest was sold to O Dorey & Sons Ltd, Guernsey, Channel Islands and was renamed Perelle. She was towed to Gothenburg, Sweden in 1961 for scrapping but was leased out as a floating warehouse in Denmark. In 1962, she was cut down to a barge and was renamed Tor. She was still in service in 1965.
