= MV Stirlingshire (1944) =

History
- Name: Empire Falkland (1944–46); Stirlingshire (1946–66)
- Owner: Ministry of War Transport (1944–45); Ministry of Transport (1945–46); Scottish Shire Line Ltd (1946–60); Houston Line Ltd (1960–66)
- Operator: Turnbull, Martin & Co Ltd (1945–60); Houston Line Ltd (1960–66)
- Port of registry: Belfast, United Kingdom
- Builder: Harland & Wolff
- Yard number: 1276
- Launched: 2 September 1944
- Completed: 21 February 1945
- Maiden voyage: 25 February 1945
- Out of service: September 1966
- Identification: United Kingdom Official Number 168536; Code Letters GCQD
- Fate: Scrapped

General characteristics
- Class & type: Refrigerated cargo liner
- Tonnage: 7,067 GRT; 4,808 NRT
- Length: 432 ft 9 in (131.90 m)
- Beam: 56 ft 2 in (17.12 m)
- Depth: 34 ft 2 in (10.41 m)
- Propulsion: 4SCSA diesel engine, single screw propeller
- Speed: 12 knots (22 km/h)

Stirlingshire was a 7,067 GRT refrigerated cargo liner that was built in 1944 by Harland & Wolff Ltd, Belfast, United Kingdom as Empire Falkland for the Ministry of War Transport (MoWT. She was sold into merchant service in 1946 and renamed Stirlingshire. She served until 1966, when she was scrapped.

== Description ==
The ship was built in 1944 by Harland & Wolff Ltd, Belfast.

The ship was 432 feet 9 inches (131.90 m) long, with a beam of 56 feet 2 inches (17.12 m). She had a depth of 34 feet 3 inches (10.44 m), She was assessed at 7,067 GRT, 4,808 NRT, The ship was propelled by a four-stroke Single Cycle, Single Action diesel engine, which had six cylinders of 29 1/2 inches (75 cm) diameter by 59 1/16 inches (150 cmm) stroke driving a screw propeller. The engine was built by Harlane & Wolff Ltd, Glasgow. It could propel her at 12 knots (22 km/h).

== History ==
Empire Falkland was launched on 2 September 1944 and completed in February 1945. The code letters GCQD and United Kingdom official number 168536 were allocated. She was operated under the management of Turnbull, Martin & Co Ltd.

Empire Falkland made her maiden voyage on 25 February 1945, joining Convoy OS 113 km. She departed from the Clyde, joining the convoy, which had departed from Liverpool, Lancashire. The convoy separated at sea on 1 March to form OS 113 and KMS 87. The latter arrived at Gibraltar on 6 March. Empire Falkland was in the portion of the convoy which formed OS 113, and dispersed on the day the convoys split. Her destination was Buenos Aires, Argentina, where she arrived on 21 March. She loaded a cargo of meat, and sailed to Gibraltar, where she arrived on 27 April. Empire Falkland joined Convoy MKS98G, which departed on 30 April and arrived at Liverpool on 8 May. She left the convoy at the Clyde and sailed to The Downs, Kent, arriving the next day. She then joined Convoy TAM 163, which departed from Southend, Essex on 9 May and arrived at Antwerp, Belgium the next day. Empire Falkland returned with Convoy ATM 164, which departed on 24 May and arrived at Southend the next day. She sailed on to Cardiff, Glamorgan, where she arrived on 28 March.

Empire Falkland departed from Cardiff on 2 June for New Orleans, Louisiana, United States, arriving on 13 June. She sailed on 28 June for Cristóbal, Colón, Panama, arriving on 5 July. She then sailed to Balboa, Panama, from where she departed on 7 July for Sydney, New South Wales, Australia, arriving on 4 August. Empire Falkland sailed on 28 August for Melbourne, Victoria, arriving two days later. She sailed on 14 September for Auckland, New Zealand, where she arrived on 20 September. She sailed on 11 October for the Cape Verde Islands Portugal, arriving on 17 November. Empire Falkland sailed that day for Avonmouth, Somerset, United Kingdom, arriving on 27 November. She sailed on 5 December for Newport, Monmouthshire, arriving the next day.

In 1946, Empire Falkland was sold to the Scottish Shire Line Ltd, Glasgow and renamed Stirlingshire. She was operated under the management of Turnbull, Martin & Co Ltd. On 5 September 1946, Stirlingshire departed from Melbourne, Australia with a cargo that included 6,000 tons of foodstuffs, including beef, butter, eggs, lamb, meat sundries and turkeys, as well as a cargo of wool, which was carried above deck to make room for the meat. She was to sail to Liverpool via the Suez Canal, with an expected arrival in mid-October. In 1960, Stirlingshire was sold to Houston Line Ltd. On 22 November 1961, Stirlingshire collided with the Danish Lily Nielsen at Durban, South Africa. Lily Nielsen then collided with the South African Sherwood. Her departure was delayed whilst the damage was inspected. She served until 1966, arriving at Bruges, Belgium on 2 September for scrapping.
