= List of shipwrecks in 1975 =

The list of shipwrecks in 1975 includes ships sunk, foundered, grounded, or otherwise lost during 1975.

table of contents
1975
Jan	Feb	Mar	Apr
May	Jun	Jul	Aug
Sep	Oct	Nov	Dec
Unknown date

== January ==
=== 4 January ===
List of shipwrecks: 4 January 1975
Ship	State	Description
Sand Swan	United Kingdom	The dredger ran aground off the coast of Brittany, France and sank at the stern. She was repaired and returned to service.

=== 5 January ===
List of shipwrecks: 5 January 1975
Ship	State	Description
Lake Illawarra	Australia	The bulk carrier sank in the River Derwent in Tasmania, Australia, after a collision with the Tasman Bridge.

=== 6 January ===
List of shipwrecks: 6 January 1975
Ship	State	Description
Robert G. Seymour	United States	The motor vessel was destroyed by fire at Angoon, Alaska.

=== 11 January ===
List of shipwrecks: 11 January 1975
Ship	State	Description
David Foss	United States	While tending an oil platform in icy conditions, the tug sank near Cape Kasilof (60°22′N 151°22′W) in Cook Inlet on the south-central coast of Alaska. Her crew of six survived.

=== 14 January ===
List of shipwrecks: 14 January 1975
Ship	State	Description
Suzanne	United States	The 275-gross register ton barge was wrecked at Cape Suckling (59°59′30″N 143°53′00″W) on the south-central coast of Alaska.

=== 20 January ===
List of shipwrecks: 20 January 1975
Ship	State	Description
Danesh	Iran	The tug collided with the motor vessel Arya Tab and the barge Gulf 107 (both Iran) and sank in Khor Musa Channel off Khorramshahr.
"Spinningdale"	United Kingdom	The 72.75-foot (22.17 m) fishing vessel was wrecked 1/2 mile west of North Light, Fair Isle, Shetland Islands, Scotland in gale force winds and heavy weather. Three crew rescued by inflatable from oil field safety trawler "Summerlee" (United Kingdom), and her Captain and 2 crew by the ferry "Good Shepard III" (United Kingdom). At some point slid off and sank a little to the east of the stranding point.

=== 29 January ===
List of shipwrecks: 20 January 1975
Ship	State	Description
Jakob Maersk	Denmark	While entering the port of Leixões, Portugal, with the assistance of tugboats, the tanker ran aground on a sandbar, caught fire, and suffered a series of explosions that broke her apart. Seven of her 17 crew members died, and she burned for 58 hours.

=== 25 January ===
List of shipwrecks: 25 January 1975
Ship	State	Description
Lovat	United Kingdom	The coaster sank in a west-northwest gale gusting to hurricane force 25 nautical miles (46 km) south of Penzance, England. All crew lost.

== February ==
=== 2 February ===
List of shipwrecks: 2 February 1975
Ship	State	Description
Moskva	Soviet Navy	The Moskva-class helicopter carrier was severely damaged by fire.

=== 11 February ===
List of shipwrecks: 11 February 1975
Ship	State	Description
K P No. 2	United States	The 62-gross register ton, 65-foot (19.8 m) barge was lost off Vanik Island (56°28′N 132°36′W) in Southeast Alaska, 14 nautical miles (26 km; 16 mi) west of Wrangell, Alaska.

=== 20 February ===
List of shipwrecks: 20 February 1975
Ship	State	Description
George P. Garrison	United States	Sunk as an artificial reef 30 nautical miles (56 km) east of Cape Henry.
Marten	United States	The 188-gross register ton, 82.2-foot (25.1 m) crab-fishing vessel struck a rock pinnacle, capsized, and sank with the loss of three lives off Spruce Cape (57°49′15″N 152°20′00″W) on Kodiak Island, 4 nautical miles (7.4 km; 4.6 mi) north of the harbor at Kodiak, Alaska. Her only survivor was her captain, who clung to a cliff in a snowstorm overnight before he was rescued.

=== Unknown date ===
List of shipwrecks: Unknown date 1975
Ship	State	Description
Rogue	Canada	The tugboat sank off Triple Island, British Columbia.

== March ==
=== 14 March ===
List of shipwrecks: 14 March 1975
Ship	State	Description
Rey Mar Houston	United States	The 157-gross register ton motor vessel sank off Popof Island in the Shumagin Islands off the south coast of Alaska.

=== 17 March ===
List of shipwrecks: 17 March 1975
Ship	State	Description
Red Eagle	Thailand	The coastal trading vessel sank in Telok Ayer Basin, Singapore. She was refloated and consequently scrapped.

== April ==
=== 4 April ===
List of shipwrecks: 4 April 1975
Ship	State	Description
Spartan Lady	Liberia	The oil tanker broke apart in heavy seas in the North Atlantic Ocean south of Martha's Vineyard, Massachusetts.

=== 6 April ===
List of shipwrecks: 26 April 1975
Ship	State	Description
Santa Elia	Panama	The bulk carrier ran aground off Vlissingen, Zeeland, Netherlands. She was on a voyage from Antwerp, Belgium to Hull, Humberside, United Kingdom. Later refloated, but laid up. Scrapped in 1976.

=== 15 April ===
List of shipwrecks: 15 April 1975
Ship	State	Description
USS Killen	United States Navy	The decommissioned Fletcher-class destroyer was sunk as a target off Vieques Island, Puerto Rico.

=== 17 April ===
List of shipwrecks: 17 April 1975
Ship	State	Description
Manzanita	United States	The 78-gross register ton, 76.5-foot (23.3 m) motor vessel sank in the Gulf of Alaska near Cordova, Alaska.

=== 19 April ===
List of shipwrecks: 19 April 1975
Ship	State	Description
Ida K	United States	The 18-gross register ton, 39.4-foot (12.0 m) fishing vessel sank in Stephens Passage near Juneau, Alaska.

=== 22 April ===
List of shipwrecks: 22 April 1975
Ship	State	Description
Unidentified skiff	United States	The skiff sank with the loss of two lives in Valdez Narrows (61.0678°N 146.6697°W) on the south-central coast of Alaska after a 3-inch (76 mm) hole opened in her hull.

=== 27 April ===
List of shipwrecks: 27 April 1975
Ship	State	Description
USS Carbonero	United States Navy	The decommissioned Balao-class submarine was sunk as a torpedo target in the Pacific Ocean off Hawaii by the submarine USS Pogy (United States Navy).

=== 30 April ===
List of shipwrecks: 30 April 1975
Ship	State	Description
RVNS Keo Ngua	Republic of Vietnam Navy	Vietnam War: The Phu Du-class motor gunboat was scuttled at the conclusion of the war to prevent capture .
Suntory	United States	The motor vessel was destroyed by fire in Day Harbor on the coast of the Kenai Peninsula in Alaska.

== May ==
=== 2 May ===
List of shipwrecks: 2 May 1975
Ship	State	Description
HDMS Delfinen	Royal Danish Navy	The Delfinen-class submarine was severely damaged by fire off the coast of Norway. The fire was extinguished and she was towed into Haakonsvern, Norway.
RVNS Lam Giang	Republic of Vietnam Navy	Vietnam War: End of War: The Hat Giang-class landing ship was scuttled to prevent capture.

=== 11 May ===
List of shipwrecks: 11 May 1975
Ship	State	Description
USS Bell	United States Navy	The decommissioned Fletcher-class destroyer was sunk as a target.

=== 13 May ===
List of shipwrecks: 13 May 1975
Ship	State	Description
VR 1	Khmer Rouge	Vietnam War: Mayaguez Incident: The Type 108 fast attack craft was sunk by U.S. aircraft.
VR 2	Khmer Rouge	Vietnam War: Mayaguez Incident: The Type 108 fast attack craft was sunk by U.S. aircraft.
Three unidentified patrol boats	Khmer Rouge	Vietnam War: Mayaguez Incident: U.S. aircraft sank the Patrol Craft Fast.
Two unidentified motor torpedo boats	Khmer Rouge	Vietnam War: Mayaguez Incident: U.S. aircraft sank the Higgins-type patrol torpedo boats at Kampong Som, Cambodia.

=== 25 May ===
List of shipwrecks: 25 May 1975
Ship	State	Description
Kevalaksa	United States	While under tow by the tug Daphne (United States) carrying logs, cement, and general cargo, the 3,384-gross register ton, 326-foot (99.4 m) barge capsized and sank off the south-central coast of Alaska near Kachemak Bay and Seldovia.

=== Unknown date ===
List of shipwrecks: Unknown date in May 1975
Ship	State	Description
RVNS Hau Giang	Republic of Vietnam Navy	Vietnam War: The Hat Giang-class landing craft mechanized was scuttled to prevent capture at the conclusion of the war. She was raised, repaired, and put in Vietnam People's Navy service.

== June ==
=== 6 June ===
List of shipwrecks: 6 June 1975
Ship	State	Description
Peramtaris	Cyprus	The cargo ship caught fire east of Malta (36°45′N 16°25′E) and was abandoned by her crew. She was subsequently reboarded, and put in to Augusta, Sicily, Italy on 12 June. She was laid up and then moved to Piraeus, Greece in July 1976. Scrapped in February 1979.

=== 10 June ===
List of shipwrecks: 10 June 1975
Ship	State	Description
Benjamin Waterhouse	United States	The Liberty ship was scuttled off Horn Island, Mississippi.

=== 13 June ===
List of shipwrecks: 13 June 1975
Ship	State	Description
USS Moore	United States Navy	The decommissioned Edsall-class destroyer escort was sunk as a target in the Atlantic Ocean off Virginia.

=== 16 June ===
List of shipwrecks: 16 June 1975
Ship	State	Description
Cynthia Rea	United States	The gillnet fishing vessel ran aground on Zarembo Island in the Alexander Archipelago in Southeast Alaska 30 nautical miles (56 km; 35 mi) south of Petersburg, Alaska, and sank with the loss of three lives.

=== 21 June ===
List of shipwrecks: 21 June 1975
Ship	State	Description
Forrester	United States	The 32-foot (9.8 m) fishing vessel sank with the loss of one life after colliding with the Alaska Marine Highway System ferry Malaspina (United States) in Olga Strait (57°11′N 135°27′W) in Southeast Alaska.
Nicholas C	Panama	The bulk carrier sprang a leak and was abandoned 200 nautical miles (370 km) off Beira, Mozambique. Presumed subsequently foundered.

== July ==
=== 6 July ===
List of shipwrecks: 6 July 1975
Ship	State	Description
Neches	United States	The cargo ship was probably sunk by a mine off El Arish, Egypt.

=== 8 July ===
List of shipwrecks: 8 July 1975
Ship	State	Description
Barge No. 12	United States	The steel barge sank in 40 feet (12 m) of water in Lake Huron off Presque Isle, Michigan, at 45.13655°N 83.159233°W.

=== 14 July ===
List of shipwrecks: 14 July 1975
Ship	State	Description
Dalmatia	United States	The 12-gross register ton motor vessel sank 7 nautical miles (13 km; 8.1 mi) south of Naknek, Alaska.

=== 15 July ===
List of shipwrecks: 15 July 1975
Ship	State	Description
Point Law	United Kingdom	Point Law on the rocks in Alderney, Channel Islands in 1975. The coastal tanker ran aground on the south west coast of Alderney, Channel Islands. Her crew were rescued by the St Peter Port Lifeboat, Alderney Fire Brigade, a cliff rescue team and a French helicopter.

=== 19 July ===
List of shipwrecks: 19 July 1975
Ship	State	Description
Herma A	Trinidad and Tobago	The Empire F-type coaster foundered at Port of Spain, Trinidad, during a storm.

=== 23 July ===
List of shipwrecks: 23 July 1975
Ship	State	Description
Shelly Ann	United States	The 34-foot (10 m) vessel sank without loss of life at Narrow Cape (57°25′30″N 152°20′00″W) on the coast of Kodiak Island, Alaska.

=== 24 July ===
List of shipwrecks: 24 July 1975
Ship	State	Description
Savoydean	Panama	The vessel caught fire in Calcutta.

== August ==
=== 10 August ===
List of shipwrecks: 10 August 1975
Ship	State	Description
Citation	United States	The motor vessel sank in Sitka Sound in Southeast Alaska.
Mojo	United States	The 26-foot (7.9 m) vessel sank in Ugak Bay (57°25′N 152°35′W) on the coast of Kodiak Island, Alaska, without loss of life. The fishing vessel Mariner (United States) rescued her crew.

=== 15 August ===
List of shipwrecks: 15 August 1975
Ship	State	Description
Pursuit	United States	The 11-gross register ton, 29.2-foot (8.9 m) fishing vessel was destroyed by fire at Dry Pass (56°28′00″N 132°22′40″W) in Wrangell, Alaska.

=== 20 August ===
List of shipwrecks: 20 August 1975
Ship	State	Description
USS Mona Island	United States Navy	The decommissioned Luzon-class internal combustion engine repair ship was sunk as an artificial reef off Wachapreague, Virginia, at 37°32′36″N 075°26′18″W.

=== 21 August ===
List of shipwrecks: 21 August 1975
Ship	State	Description
Unidentified fishing vessel	United States	The fishing vessel capsized near Cordova, Alaska, killing her captain's two daughters.

=== Unknown date ===
List of shipwrecks: Unknown date in August 1975
Ship	State	Description
SS Edward W. Scripps	United States	The Liberty ship was scuttled off South Padre Island, Texas.

== September ==
=== 1 September ===
List of shipwrecks: 1 September 1975
Ship	State	Description
Commander	United States	The motor vessel was wrecked at Chignik Lagoon, Alaska.

=== 16 September ===
List of shipwrecks: 16 September 1975
Ship	State	Description
Unidentified fishing vessel	United States	The fishing vessel capsized in Vallenar Bay (55.3856°N 131.8472°W) in Southeast Alaska near Ketchikan, Alaska, killing one person.

=== 26 September ===
List of shipwrecks: 26 September 1975
Ship	State	Description
Foss 209	United States	While under tow by the vessel Leslie Foss (United States) off the south-central coast of Alaska, the barge capsized. She was towed 60 nautical miles (110 km; 69 mi) out into the Gulf of Alaska near Cape Saint Elias and scuttled with explosive charges.

== October ==
=== 4 October ===
List of shipwrecks: 4 October 1975
Ship	State	Description
Hongkong Delegate	Liberia	The Victory ship suffered extensive damage in a collision with the Columbus Canada (West Germany) off Monterey, California, United States. She was sold for scrap.

=== 8 October ===
List of shipwrecks: 8 October 1975
Ship	State	Description
George L. Farley	United States	The Liberty ship was scuttled off South Padre Island, Texas.

=== 12 October ===
List of shipwrecks: 12 October 1975
Ship	State	Description
Hustler	United States	The 24-gross register ton, 43.2-foot (13.2 m) fishing vessel sank off Kodiak Island in Alaska's Kodiak Archipelago.

=== 24 October ===
List of shipwrecks: 24 October 1975
Ship	State	Description
Robert Mills	United States	The Liberty ship was scuttled off the coast of Alabama.

== November ==
=== 1 November ===
List of shipwrecks: 1 November 1975
Ship	State	Description
Baleen	United States	While under tow after suffering fire damage, the 102-foot (31 m) tug sank in 170 feet (52 m) of water off the coast of Massachusetts in Boston Harbor′s outer harbor 6 nautical miles (11 km; 6.9 mi) east-northeast of The Graves Light at 42°23′05″N 070°44′02″W.

=== 10 November ===
List of shipwrecks: 10 November 1975
Ship	State	Description
Edmund Fitzgerald	United States	The lake freighter sank in Lake Superior near Whitefish Bay with the loss of all 29 aboard. The wreck was found in two pieces on the bottom by a remotely operated underwater vehicle in 1976.

== December ==
=== 3 December ===
List of shipwrecks: 3 December 1975
Ship	State	Description
Sealee	United States	The fishing vessel was lost during severe weather in Culross Passage between Culross Island and the northeastern end of the Kenai Peninsula near "Night Island" (probably a reference to Knight Island) at the western end of Prince William Sound off the south-central coast of Alaska.
Sharkay	United States	The fishing vessel was lost during severe weather in Culross Passage between Culross Island and the northeastern end of the Kenai Peninsula near "Night Island" (probably a reference to Knight Island) at the western end of Prince William Sound off the south-central coast of Alaska.

=== 7 December ===
List of shipwrecks: 7 December 1975
Ship	State	Description
Western	United States	The 89-foot (27.1 m) shrimper and her crew of three men disappeared in the Gulf of Alaska somewhere between Pelican and Kodiak, Alaska.

=== 13 December ===
List of shipwrecks: 13 December 1975
Ship	State	Description
Hornet	United States	The 48-gross register ton motor vessel sank in Clarence Strait in the Alexander Archipelago in Southeast Alaska near Lincoln Rock (56°03′25″N 132°41′50″W).

=== 18 December ===
List of shipwrecks: 18 December 1975
Ship	State	Description
Imbros	Cyprus	The ship foundered in the Atlantic Ocean (31°40′N 77°47′W) with the loss of all 22 crew.

=== 20 December ===
List of shipwrecks: 20 December 1975
Ship	State	Description
Unidentified fishing vessel	United States	The fishing vessel capsized off Peratrovich Island (55.5788889°N 133.11°W) in Southeast Alaska near Klawock, Alaska, killing one person.

=== 26 December ===
List of shipwrecks: 26 December 1975
Ship	State	Description
William Wheelwright	United Kingdom	The tanker ran aground off Sinoe, Liberia. She was refloated on 29 December and towed to Lisbon, Portugal. Deemed beyond repair, she was subsequently scrapped in 1976.

=== 28 December ===
List of shipwrecks: 28 December 1975
Ship	State	Description
Kim Hua Li	Panama	The coastal tanker sank in the South China Sea (2°19′N 109°01′E). She was on a voyage from Singapore to Kuching, Malaysia.

=== 30 December ===
List of shipwrecks: 30 December 1975
Ship	State	Description
Berge Istra	Norway	The supertanker exploded and sank south west of Mindanao Island, the Philippines. Two of the 32 crew survived and were rescued after 22 days adrift in a lifeboat.

== Unknown date ==
List of shipwrecks: Unknown date 1975
Ship	State	Description
Antonio Maceo	Cuban Revolutionary Navy	The decommissioned Tacoma-class frigate was sunk as a target.
"April Diamond"	United Kingdom	The trawler sank at dock in Scheveningen, Netherlands, sometime in 1975. Later hull removed in sections, engine and other equipment salvaged and sold off. hull sold for scrap in 1979.
Aviere	Italian Navy	The decommissioned Gleaves-class destroyer was sunk as a target.
Brenton Reef Lightship (LV-39)	United States	The old 119-foot (36 m) vessel, which had served as a lightvessel from 1875 to 1939, then in various roles thereafter, including as a floating restaurant, sank while under tow off the coast of Massachusetts 4 nautical miles (7.4 km; 4.6 mi) east of Marblehead at 44°21′00″N 068°51′24″W.
George P. Garrison	United States	The Liberty ship was scuttled off the Virginia Capes.
Mutiara II	Singapore	The TID-class tug collided with another vessel and sank.
Walter Hines Page	United States	The Liberty ship was scuttled off Wachapreague, North Carolina.
