= MV Fosdyke Trader =

History
- Name: CHANT 49 (1944); Fabric 49 (1944); Empire Fathom (1944–46); Fosdyke Trader (1946–61); Fort Carillon (1961–72); Janolyne (1972–75); Fermont (1975–91); Mon Ami (1991–91)
- Owner: Ministry of War Transport (1944–45); Ministry of Transport (1945–46); B W Steamship, Tug & Lighter Company, Craggs & Jenkin Ltd (1946); Great Yarmouth Shipping Co Ltd (1946–61); J P Desgagnes (1961–72); L Tremblay (1972–75); J P Benoit & G Tremblay (1975-86); J G Cloutier (1986); Caboutiers Samray Inc (1986–88); E Bisson (1988–91); R Peck (1991–91)
- Operator: Pinch & Simpson (1945–46); B W Steamship, Tug & Lighter Company, Craggs & Jenkin Ltd (1946); Great Yarmouth Shipping Co Ltd (1946–61); Jean-Paul Desgagnes (1961–72); Laurent Tremblay (1972-75); Transport Maritime Harvey Ltee (1975–78)
- Port of registry: Hull, United Kingdom (1944-61); Quebec City, Canada (1961-65); Quebec City, Canada (1965-91); United States (1990–91)
- Builder: Henry Scarr Ltd
- Yard number: 458
- Launched: August 1944
- Completed: September 1944
- Identification: United Kingdom Official Number 180394 (1944–61); Code Letters MCJS; (1944-61); IMO number: 5117925 (1960s–91); Tennessee pleasure craft registration; TN 9458TK (1990–91)
- Fate: Wrecked

General characteristics
- Class & type: Empire F type coaster
- Tonnage: 411 GRT; 190 NRT
- Length: 142 feet 2 inches (43.33 m)BP
- Beam: 27 ft 0 in (8.23 m)
- Depth: 8 ft 5 in (2.57 m)
- Propulsion: Diesel engine, single screw propeller

Fosdyke Trader was a 411 GRT Empire F type coaster that was built in 1944 by Henry Scarr Ltd, Hessle, United Kingdom as Empire Fathom for the Ministry of War Transport (MoWT). She was sold in 1946 and renamed Fosdyke Trader. In 1961, she was sold to Canada and renamed Fort Carillon. Further sales in 1972 and 1975 saw her renamed Janolyne and Fermont. A proposed conversion to a floating restaurant fell through and she was sold in 1990 to an American and renamed Mon Ami. She was wrecked on 17 November 1991 on Seal Island, Canada.

== Description ==
The ship was an Empire F type coaster built in 1944 by Henry Scarr Ltd, Hessle, United Kingdom.

The ship was 142 feet 2 inches (43.33 m) long between perpendiculars (148 ft overall), with a beam of 27 feet 0 inches (8.23 m). She had a depth of 8 feet 5 inches (2.57 m). She was assessed at 411 GRT, 190 NRT.

As built, the ship was propelled by a four-stroke Single Cycle, Single Action diesel engine, which had seven cylinders of 8¾ inches (22 cm) diameter by 11½ inches (30 cm) stroke driving a screw propeller. The engine was built by Blackstone & Co Ltd, Stamford, Lincolnshire.

== History ==
Empire Fathom was built by Henry Scarr Ltd, Hessle, United Kingdom. Laid down as CHANT 49 then renamed Fabric 49 whilst under construction, she was launched as Empire Fathom in December 1944 and completed in January 1945. Built for the MOWT, she was placed under the management of Pinch & Simpson Ltd, . The United Kingdom Official Number 180394 and Code Letters MCJS were allocated. Her port of registry was Hull.

In 1946, Empire Fathom was sold to B W Steamship, Tug & Lighter Company, Craggs & Jenkins Ltd, Hull, and renamed Fosdyke Trader. Later that year, she was sold to the Great Yarmouth Shipping Co Ltd, Great Yarmouth, Norfolk. On 1 November 1952, Fosdyke Trader broke from her moorings in the River Welland at Fosdyke, Lincolnshire and became wedged under the Fosdyke Bridge, which carries the A17 road over the river. She was later freed as the tide went out.

Fosdyke Trader was sold in 1961 to Jean-Paul Desgagnes, Saint-Joseph-de-la-Rive, Quebec, Canada and was renamed Fort Carillon. With the introduction of IMO Numbers in the late 1960s, Fort Carillon was allocated the IMO Number 5117925. On the night of 12 September 1966, while en route from Montréal to Lauzon with a deck cargo of steel plates, she suffered a steering gear failure and the vessel took a list on starboard, losing 148 plates overboard. In the Court view, the Fort-Carillon was overload as for her deck cargo. She was then chartered in 1970 by the Clarke Shipping Co and was laid up in 1971 at L'Isle-aux-Coudres, Quebec. In 1971, Fort Carillon was sold to Laurent Tremblay, L'Isle-aux-Coudres, Quebec and renamed Janolyne. In 1975, Janolyne was sold to J P Benoit & G Tremblay, Quebec and was renamed Fermont. She was operated under the management of Transport Maritime Harvey Ltee. Fermont was laid up in 1978 at Quebec City. A new 360 horsepower (270 kW) V12 diesel engine manufactured by Detroit Diesel was installed as the ship was to have been sold to new Greek owners but the sale fell through. She was beached in 1979 at Petite-Rivière-Saint-François, Quebec. In 1987, she was sold to J G Cloutier of Boucherville, Quebec for conversion to a floating restaurant but the scheme was not proceeded with. She was sold later that year to Caboutiers Samway Inc., Longueuil, Quebec. In 1988, Fermont was sold to E Bisson of Sabrevois, Quebec.

In 1991, Fermont was sold to James R Peck of Etowah, Tennessee, United States and was renamed non officially Mon Ami. She was registered in Tennessee as a cargo. A charter to carry motor cars to Haiti fell through when the Canadian Government placed an embargo on exports to Haiti. On 24 July, the ship was detained by Canadian authorities as the deemed the vessel unseaworthy. Despite the arrest, the vessel was re-registered this time as a pleasure craft and Mon Ami sailed from Sorel, Quebec on 1 August allegedly under the Panamanian Flag. The ship was intercepted the next day by the Royal Canadian Mounted Police with the assistance of two Canadian Forces helicopters and one Canadian Coast Guard vessel. Her owner pulled a knife on an officer of the Royal Canadian Mounted Police who had landed on the ship but he was overpowered. He was later sentenced to three months' imprisonment, claiming in his defence that he thought the ship was under attack by pirates. He was released a fortnight later after a C$6,000 fine was paid and bail was posted. Mon Ami sailed from L'Isle-aux-Coudres on 3 November under the Panamanian Flag. She put into Halifax, Nova Scotia on 7 November, now flying the American Flag, departing the next day. She returned on 11 November due to problems with her compass. Mon Ami departed on 12 November bound for Miami, Florida, United States. On 17 November, she was caught in a gale and lost her anchor. She was then intentionally beached on the south coast of Seal Island, Nova Scotia. Her five crew were rescued. Mon Ami was abandoned, and still in situ as of September 2007. It seems that Fosdyke Trader was the very last operational "Empire F" coaster.
