= MV Mahiri =

Coastal tanker built in 1944

History
- Name: CHANT 18 (1944); Fabric 18 (1944); Empire Farringdon (1944–46); Susie Olivier (1946–48); Mahiri (1948–74)
- Owner: Ministry of War Transport (1944–45); Ministry of Transport (1945–46); De Malglaive Shipping Co (1946–48); Booker Brothers, McConnell & Co Ltd (1948–74)
- Operator: Great Yarmouth Shipping Co Ltd (1944–46); De Malglaive Shipping Co (1946–48); Booker Brothers, McConnell & Co Ltd (1948–72); Island Shipping Co Ltd, (1972–74)
- Port of registry: Hull, United Kingdom
- Builder: Henry Scarr Ltd
- Launched: August 1944
- Completed: September 1944
- Identification: United Kingdom Official Number 180293; Code Letters MLLZ
- Fate: Sank

General characteristics
- Class & type: Empire F type coaster
- Tonnage: 411 GRT; 190 NRT
- Length: 142 feet 2 inches (43.33 m)
- Beam: 27 ft 0 in (8.23 m)
- Depth: 8 ft 5 in (2.57 m)
- Installed power: 42 nhp
- Propulsion: Diesel engine, single screw propeller

Location where Mahiri foundered off Trinidad.

Mahiri was a 411 GRT Empire F type coaster that was built in 1944 by Henry Scarr Ltd, Hessle, United Kingdom, as Empire Farringdon for the Ministry of War Transport (MoWT). She was sold in 1946 and renamed Susie Olivier. A further sale in 1948 saw her renamed Mahiri. She served until 1974, when she sprang a leak and foundered.

== Description ==
The ship was an Empire F type coaster built in 1944 by Henry Scarr Ltd, Hessle, United Kingdom.

The ship was 142 feet 2 inches (43.33 m) long, with a beam of 27 feet 0 inches (8.23 m). She had a depth of 8 feet 5 inches (2.57 m). She was assessed at 411 GRT, 190 NRT.

The ship was propelled by a four-stroke Single Cycle, Single Action diesel engine, which had six cylinders of 8½ inches (22 cm) diameter by 13¾ inches (35 cm) stroke driving a screw propeller. The engine was built by Mirrlees, Bickerton & Day Ltd, Stockport, Cheshire. It was rated at 42 nhp.

== History ==
Empire Farringdon was built by Henry Scarr Ltd, Hessle, United Kingdom. Laid down as CHANT 18 then renamed Fabric 18 whilst under construction, she was launched as Empire Farringdon in August 1944 and completed in September 1944. Built for the MOWT, she was placed under the management of the Great Yarmouth Shipping Co Ltd. The United Kingdom Official Number 180293 and Code Letters MLLZ were allocated. Her port of registry was Hull.

In 1946, Empire Farringdon was sold to De Malglaive Shipping Ltd, Windsor, Berkshire, and renamed Susie Olivier. She was sold in 1948 to Booker Brothers, McConnell & Co Ltd and was renamed Mahiri. A new diesel engine was fitted in 1962. In 1972, management of the vessel was placed with the Island Shipping Co, Trinidad. On 19 February 1974, Mahiri sprang a leak 94 nautical miles (174 km) south east of Tobago. She was taken in tow but capsized and sank in the Gulf of Paria (10°37′N 61°34′W).
