= Antonio Maceo (disambiguation) =

Antonio Maceo was a general in the Cuban revolutionary army.

Antonio Maceo may also refer to:

- Antonio Maceo Airport, serving Santiago de Cuba
- USS Peoria (PF-67), a frigate sold to the Cuban Navy and renamed Antonio Maceo
- Antonio Maceo (Mexico City Metrobús), a BRT station in Mexico City

== See also ==
- Antonio Maceo Brigade, an American political organization founded in the 1970s
