= Henry Scarr =

Henry Scarr Ltd.
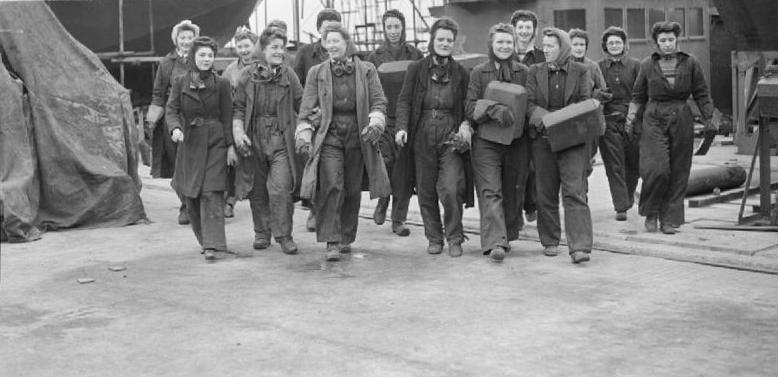
- Henry Scarr employed female welders to build prefabricated ships during the Second World War.
- Type: Private company
- Industry: Shipbuilding
- Fate: Bought out
- Successor: Richard Dunston
- Headquarters: Hessle, East Riding of Yorkshire, England

Henry Scarr Ltd. was an English shipbuilding company based in the East Riding of Yorkshire at Hessle on the Humber. Henry Scarr took over an existing shipyard in 1897, and continued to build ships there until 1932, when the site was bought by Richard Dunston Ltd. Dunstons operated the shipyard until 1974, and after a series of takeovers, shipbuilding ceased in 1994.

== History ==
Henry Scarr began his career in shipbuilding working with his brother Joseph in a yard at Beverley on the River Hull. The output from the yard included steel steam tugs, including Southern Cross, which was completed in 1896 for the City Steam Towing Company. It was fitted with a 200 ihp steam engine, and was still operational in 1921, when it became one of the first tugs owned by the newly formed United Towing Company. The partnership between the brothers was dissolved in 1897, and Henry moved to Hessle. The shipyard, which he bought and constructed wooden ships, including sloops and small pleasure craft, but after he took it over, the building of wooden ships ceased, and only iron and steel ships were produced. He advertised that the slipway at the yard was suitable for ships up to 100 feet (30 m) long.

Scarr continued the numbering sequence for ships which had been used at Beverley, which consisted of an initial 'S' and a yard number. Thus Southern Cross, which was built at Beverley, was S.80, and S.123 was built at Hessle just five years later, being launched on 23 March 1901. The ship was named Pioneer and was a steel coasting steamer, which was 98.5 by 18 feet (30.0 by 5.5 m) with a draught of 7.5 feet (2.3 m). It was fitted with a 125 ihp engine and was supplied to the Goole-based company of J H Wetherall. It became the first seagoing ship to reach Leeds on the newly enlarged Aire and Calder Navigation, after having travelled to Cornwall to pick up 100 tons of china clay from the port of Fowey. It reached Leeds in August 1901, after a difficult passage along the navigation, caused by the fact that its draught was at the extreme limit of the designed depth of the canal, and that its funnel and mast were too tall to fit under most of the bridges, requiring them to be lowered many times.

The yard built a variety of ships, including steel sloops, such as Kate, which had works number S.164 and was launched on 22 February 1906. It was built for Barracloughs, and was 65 by 16 feet (19.8 by 4.9 m) with a draught of 7.5 feet (2.3 m). Despite the industrial nature of its normal tasks, it also took part in sloop races, held annually at Barton-upon-Humber until 1929. Not all of the ships remained in their original state, for S.315 Eleanor B, launched on 6 October 1923, was built as a Sheffield-sized sailing keel, but the masts were removed in 1946, and a 40 bhp (30 kW) diesel engine was fitted. Sheffield sized boats were a maximum of 61.5 by 15.5 feet (18.7 by 4.7 m), enabling them to fit through the locks on the Sheffield and South Yorkshire Navigation.

In addition to new builds, the company also took on repair work, as in the late 1920s, both Good Luck, originally launched on 21 March 1904, and Motorman from 24 March 1925 were on stocks on the main slipway at the same time. Motorman, which was a twin-screw tug, fitted with two Gardner diesel engines, each developing 78 bhp (58 kW), was used to transfer railway carriages from Carlton near Nottingham on the River Trent to Hull in 1927. 160 carriages were built by Cammell Laird for export to India. They could not be transported by rail, because they were built to Indian gauge rather than the British standard gauge, and were therefore too large. Cammell Laird ordered five dumb barges from Watson's shipyard at Gainsborough, and the tug towed trains of two barges, each loaded with one carriage, down the River Trent.

Scarrs built dumb barges in addition to powered vessels. S.313 Ril Toto and S.314 Ril Dora were built as 75 by 20 ft (22.9 by 6.1 m) lighters for the flour merchants Spillers in late 1923. Each had a 9 ft (2.7 m) draught, and in 1982, both were bought by Waddingtons, a carrying company based at Swinton, South Yorkshire on the River Don Navigation. One end of each was removed, and the two parts were welded together to form a larger dumb barge. Ril Dora became the front part of the new barge, which was named Confidence. It was used to transfer large German castings from Hull to Doncaster, and to return them once they had been machined.

In 1932, Richard Dunston's shipyard at Thorne on the Stainforth and Keadby Canal was no longer adequate, and so he bought out Scarr's yard, where larger ships could be launched. Despite the change of ownership, the yard continued to use the Scarr name until 1961, and vessels continued to be given an 'S' prefix until 1976, when H.894 Kolla, a 1000-ton Tuna clipper built for Peruvian owners and launched on 4 April, became the first to bear an 'H' prefix.

== Surviving vessels ==
Two of the vessels built at Scarr's shipyard are on the National Historic Ships register. Hunt's Kim was built as a sailing keel in 1923, and was motorised in 1946. It was used as a floating workshop in the 1980s, and then as a mooring pontoon for dredgers in the Humber. It was then left at Goole and was unused for eight years, but was bought and was undergoing restoration on the Stainforth and Keadby Canal in 2011. Eden was a similar vessel built in 1924 for John Hunts of Leeds, and originally named Hunts-Eden. It was motorised some time before 1946, when the engine was replaced. It sank in the River Ouse in the 1960s, but was refloated, and bought by Waddington's of Swinton. Waddington's fitted a new engine in 1968, gave it its present name, and it was used to carry steel beams from Goole to Rotherham. It remained in commercial use until 1998, when it was sold for private use. In 2011, it was fitted with a Perkins engine, and the owner announced his plans to refit a mast and rigging, so that it can again be sailed. The John M Rishworth is also still operational, and in 2012 was moored at Millwall Dock on the Isle of Dogs in East London. The Fire King, a 60 ft twin screw fire float built in 1906 for the River Wear Watch, survives as the Sarah Elizabeth Banks, now a private yacht based in Seattle, USA, and owned by the great grandson of the vessel’s original engine builder, F.T. Harker, who also built steam engines for other Scarr vessels

== Ships built ==
| Yard No | Name | Type | Launch | Notes |
|---|---|---|---|---|
| S123 | Pioneer | steel 'coasting steamer' | 1901 | For J H Wetherall, Goole |
| | Aire | steam tug | 1902 | Bought 1919 by Hargreaves, to replace horse haulage on the Aire and Calder Navigation |
| S139 | Halcyon | "Billy Boy" 2-masted ketch | 1903 | For M Aaron of Hull. Auxiliary engine fitted 1929. |
| S149 | Good Luck | steam towing barge | 1904 | For Rishworth, Ingleby and Lofthouse (RIL). Renamed Swiftsure |
| S164 | Kate | steel Humber sloop | 1906 | For Barracloughs |
| | Fire King | 60 ft fire float | 1906 | For River Wear Watch, Sunderland. Twin compound steam engines by FT Harker. |
| | Robie | coal-fired steam tug | 1915 | For York City Corporation |
| | John M (Rishworth) | steam towing barge | 1915 | For RIL. (Eagle, Swan and Cygnet were similar) |
| S284 | Invertyne | tanker | 1920 | For British Mexican Petroleum Co, London. |
| S313 | Ril Toto | lighter | 1923 | For Spillers. Became rear half of dumb barge Confidence, 1982. |
| S314 | Ril Dora | lighter | 1923 | For Spillers. Became front half of dumb barge Confidence, 1982. |
| S315 | Eleanor B | steel sailing keel | 1923 | For Jonas Braithwaite. Motorised 1946. |
| | Hunt's Kim | Sheffield Keel | 1923 | |
| | Hunts-Eden | Sheffield Keel | 1924 | For John Hunt & Sons, Leeds |
| | Hunts-Eve | Sheffield Keel | 1924 | For John Hunt & Sons, Leeds |
| S322 | Motorman | twin screw diesel tug | 1925 | For United Towing Co. |
| | Fossgate | towing tanker barge | 1925 | For Anglo-American Oil |
| | Lowgate | dumb tanker barge | 1925 | For Anglo-American Oil |
| | Hunts Brent | dumb barge | 1930 | Motorised by 1936 |
| S447 | Empire Fabric | Empire F type coaster | 1944 | For Ministry of War Transport |
| S448 | Empire Fabian | Empire F type coaster | 1944 | For Ministry of War Transport |
| S449 | Empire Fable | Empire F type coaster | 1944 | For Ministry of War Transport |
| S450 | Empire Farringdon | Empire F type coaster | 1944 | For Ministry of War Transport |
| S451 | Empire Fanfare | Empire F type coaster | 1944 | For Ministry of War Transport |
| S452 | Empire Faversham | Empire F type coaster | 1944 | For Ministry of War Transport |
| S453 | Empire Facility | Empire F type coaster | 1944 | For Ministry of War Transport |
| S454 | Empire Faraway | Empire F type coaster | 1944 | For Ministry of War Transport |
| S455 | Empire Fanal | Empire F type coaster | 1944 | For Ministry of War Transport |
| S456 | Empire Fastness | Empire F type coaster | 1944 | For Ministry of War Transport |
| S457 | Empire Farrier | Empire F type coaster | 1944 | For Ministry of War Transport |
| S458 | Empire Fathom | Empire F type coaster | 1944 | For Ministry of War Transport |
| S476 | Empire Maymead | Empire C type coaster | 1945 | For Ministry of War Transport |
| S477 | Empire Maytown | Empire C type coaster | 1946 | For Ministry of War Transport |
| S478 | TID 170 | TID tug | 1945 | For Ministry of War Transport |
| S479 - S484 | TID 171 - TID 176 | TID tugs (6) | 1946 | For Ministry of War Transport |

Sources: Taylor 2006, Taylor 2009 and Mitchell & Sawyer 1990.

== Bibliography ==
- Harvey, W. J. (2019). The TID Tugs of World War Two. World Ship Society. ISBN 978-0-9560769-9-1.
- Mitchell, W. H.; Sawyer, L. A. (1990). The Empire Ships. London, New York, Hamburg, Hong Kong: Lloyd's of London Press. pp. 222–225. ISBN 978-1-85044-275-2.
- Taylor, Mike (2006). Tugs and towing barges on the Humber Waterways. Tempus Publishing. ISBN 978-0-7524-3804-7.
- Taylor, Mike (2009). Richard Dunston Limited of Thorne & Hessle. Barnsley: Pen and Sword Books. ISBN 978-1-84563-094-2.
