= Hesslewood Hall =

Building in Hessle, East Riding of Yorkshire, England

Coordinates: 53°43′10″N 0°27′36″W

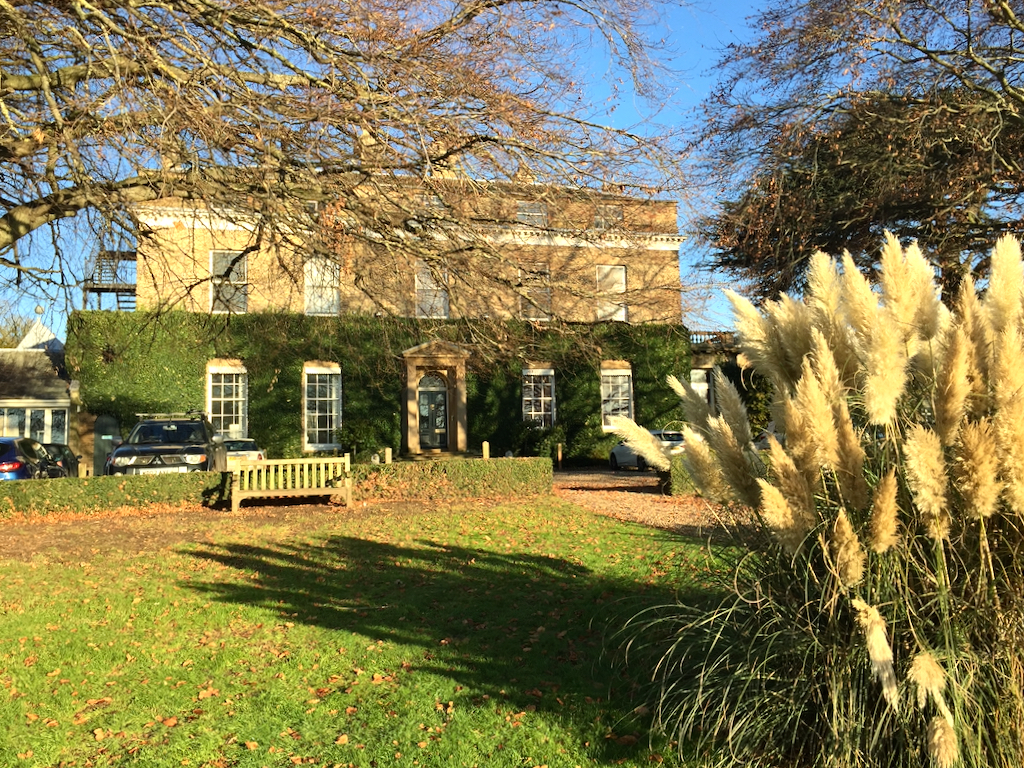
The building, in 2019

Hesslewood Hall, also known as Hesslewood House, is a historic building in Hessle, a town in the East Riding of Yorkshire, in England.

The first Hesslewood Hall was built in the early 18th century, and from 1749 was owned by the Pease family. In 1765, they built a stable block, which survives. The house was rebuilt between 1784 and 1791, to a design by Charles Mountain the elder. Joseph Pease paid £4,500 for the work. George Townsend Andrews enlarged the library and created a bay window in 1851. In 1920, the house was converted into an orphanage, the work being designed by W. S. Walker & Field. In 1985, the orphanage closed and the building became a hotel, then later became offices. It has been grade II listed since 1967.

The house is built of white brick, with stone dressings and slate roofs. It consists of a main block with two storeys and attics, and five bays, flanked by single-storey three-bay wings linked to two-storey single bay pavilions. The main block has a plinth, a floor and a sill band, a modillion cornice and a blocking course. In the centre is a porch with pilasters a dentilled cornice, and a pediment with a frieze decorated with festoons and rosettes. Steps lead up to the doorway that has a round-headed architrave and a fanlight with radial glazing. Most of the windows are sashes under wedge lintels. The right pavilion has a Venetian window on the ground floor and a Diocletian window above, and on the left pavilion is a French window. Inside, the original staircase survives.

The stable block is separately grade II listed. It is built of red brick with stone dressings and slate roofs. It consists of a main block with two storeys and three bays, and lower flanking two-storey three-bay wings. The main block has a dentilled and moulded cornice and a hipped roof, and contains three blocked elliptical gauged brick arches. The upper floor has a taking-in door, and there are sash windows on each floor, all under flat gauged brick arches. In the centre is a dated and initialled sundial. The wings each has a dentilled cornice and a hipped roof, and contains six-pane windows.

== See also ==
- Listed buildings in Hessle
