= Perry Island (Alaska) =

Island in Chugach Census Area, Alaska, United States

Coordinates: 60.718346°N 147.918042°W

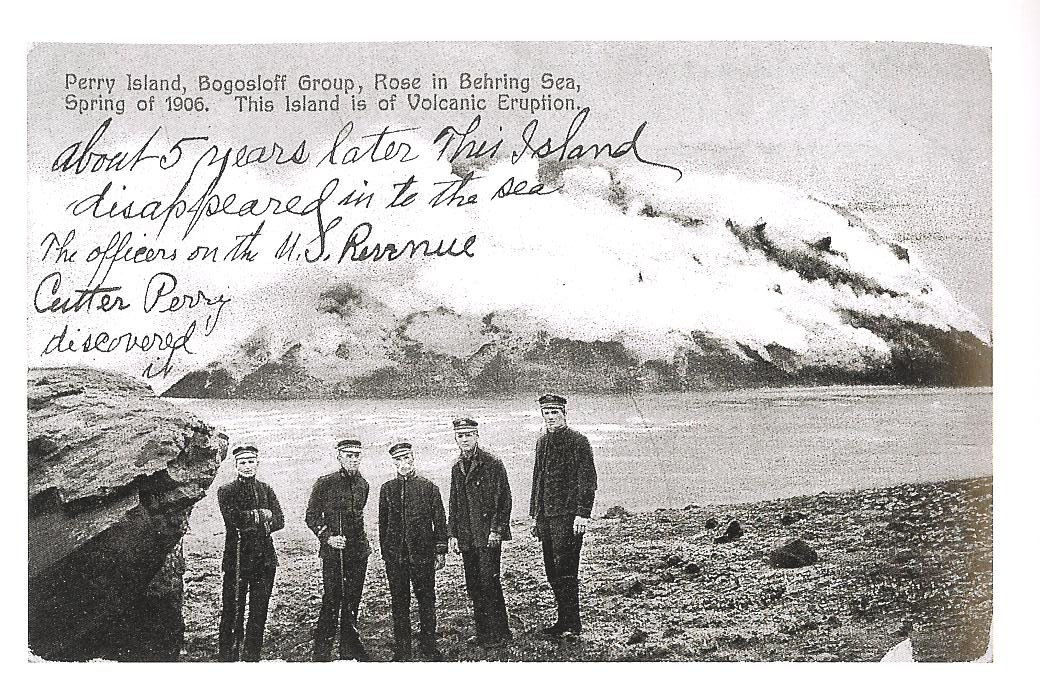
Perry Island postcard

Perry Island is an island in Prince William Sound, Alaska, within the Chugach National Forest, located immediately east of Culross Island. The island was called "Perry" by U.S. Coast and Geodetic Survey in 1900.
