= Hessle Whiting Mill =

Building in Hessle, East Riding of Yorkshire, England

Coordinates: 53°42′54″N 0°27′09″W

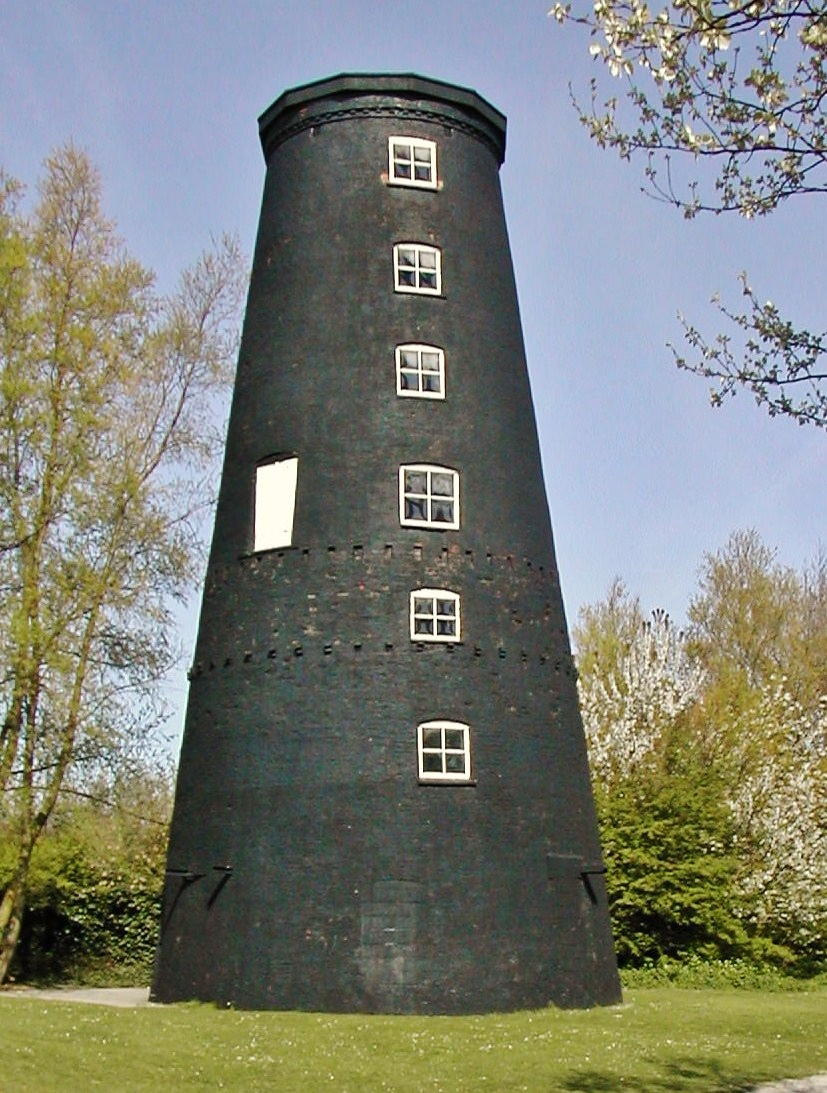
The mill, in 2009

Hessle Whiting Mill, also known as Cliff Mill, is a historic building in Hessle, a town in the East Riding of Yorkshire, in England.

A horse mill was built near the Humber Estuary in Hessle in 1796. At some point between 1810 and 1815, it was demolished and replaced by a tower windmill, to the design of Norman & Smithson. It was built for a group of quarry owners, to crush chalk to produce whiting, a product used in paint and other industrial products. It originally had five roller sails, and a tail pole, replaced by a fantail in the 1820s. The sails and head gear were removed in 1925, but the mill continued to operate under gas power, and later powered by an electric motor. The mill closed in the 1950s, but the building survived, the last four whiting mills in the East Riding. The mill was grade II listed in 1982 and with nearby ruins associated with the whiting process is also a scheduled monument. In 1983, the cap, windows and doors were replaced as part of conservation efforts. The surrounding quarry was redeveloped as Hessle Country Park, and the mill was opened to visitors. It was restored at a cost of £968,000 and reopened to visitors in 2021.

The mill is constructed of tarred brick, and consists of a tapering circular tower with six storeys. On the ground floor are segmental-headed openings of various sizes. Above is a four-light segmental-headed window on each floor, sockets and corbels for a former timber gallery, and a loading door.

== See also ==
- Listed buildings in Hessle
