= MV Herma A =

UK merchant ship

History
- Name: CHANT 17 (1944); Fabric 17 (1944); Empire Faversham (1944–47); Fawdon (1947–52); Maduni (1952–70); Herma A (1970–75)
- Owner: Ministry of War Transport (1944–45); Ministry of Transport (1945–47); Whitehaven Shipping Co Ltd (1947–52); Booker Brothers, McConnell & Co Ltd (1952–70); Pedonomou Lines Ltd (1970–75)
- Operator: R H Hunt Ltd (1944–47); Anthony & Bainbridge Ltd (1947–52); Booker Brothers, McConnell & Co Ltd (1952–70); Pedonomou Lines Ltd (1970–75)
- Port of registry: Hull, United Kingdom (1944–47); (United Kingdom) Whitehaven (1947–52); (United Kingdom) Hull (1952–70); (Trinidad and Tobago) Port of Spain, Trinidad (1970–75)
- Builder: Henry Scarr Ltd
- Launched: June 1944
- Completed: September 1944
- Out of service: 19 July 1975
- Identification: United Kingdom Official Number 180292 (1944–70); Code Letters MLLQ (1944–70)
- Fate: Sank

General characteristics
- Class & type: Empire F type coaster tanker
- Tonnage: 411 GRT; 190 NRT
- Length: 142 feet 2 inches (43.33 m)
- Beam: 27 ft 0 in (8.23 m)
- Depth: 8 ft 5 in (2.57 m)
- Installed power: 42 nhp
- Propulsion: Diesel engine, single screw propeller

Herma A was a 411 GRT Empire F type coaster that was built as Empire Faversham in 1944 by Henry Scarr Ltd, Hessle for the Ministry of War Transport (MoWT). She was sold in 1947 and renamed Fawdon. A further sale in 1952 saw her renamed Maduni. In 1970, she was sold to Trinidad and renamed Herma A. She foundered at Port of Spain in 1975 during a storm.

== Description ==
The ship was an Empire F type coaster built in 1944 by Henry Scarr Ltd, Hessle, United Kingdom.

The ship was 142 feet 2 inches (43.33 m) long, with a beam of 27 feet 0 inches (8.23 m). She had a depth of 8 feet 5 inches (2.57 m). She was assessed at 411 GRT, 190 NRT.

The ship was propelled by a four-stroke Single Cycle, Single Action diesel engine, which had seven cylinders of 8¾ inches (22 cm) diameter by 11½ inches (30 cm) stroke driving a screw propeller. The engine was built by Mirrlees, Bickerton and Day Ltd, Stockport, Cheshire. It was rated at 42 nhp.

== History ==
The ship was built by Henry Scarr Ltd, Hessle, United Kingdom. She was laid down as CHANT 17 and later renamed Fabric 17 but was launched as Empire Faversham in June 1944 and completed in September 1944. Built for the MOWT, she was placed under the management of R H Hunt Ltd. The United Kingdom Official Number 180292 and Code Letters MLLZ were allocated. Her port of registry was Hull. Little is known of her history during World War II, but her Chief Steward was killed by enemy action on 5 November 1944.

Empire Faversham was sold in 1947 to the Whitehaven Shipping Co Ltd and was renamed Fawdon. She was operated under the management of Anthony & Bainbridge Ltd. In 1952, Fawdon was sold to Booker Brothers, McConnell & Co Ltd, Hull and was renamed Maduni. A new diesel engine was fitted in 1959. In 1970, Maduni was sold to Pedonomou Lines Ltd, Trinidad and was renamed Herma A. She foundered on 19 July 1975 in a storm while moored at Port of Spain, Trinidad.
