= Hessle Town Hall =

Municipal building in Hessle, East Riding of Yorkshire, England

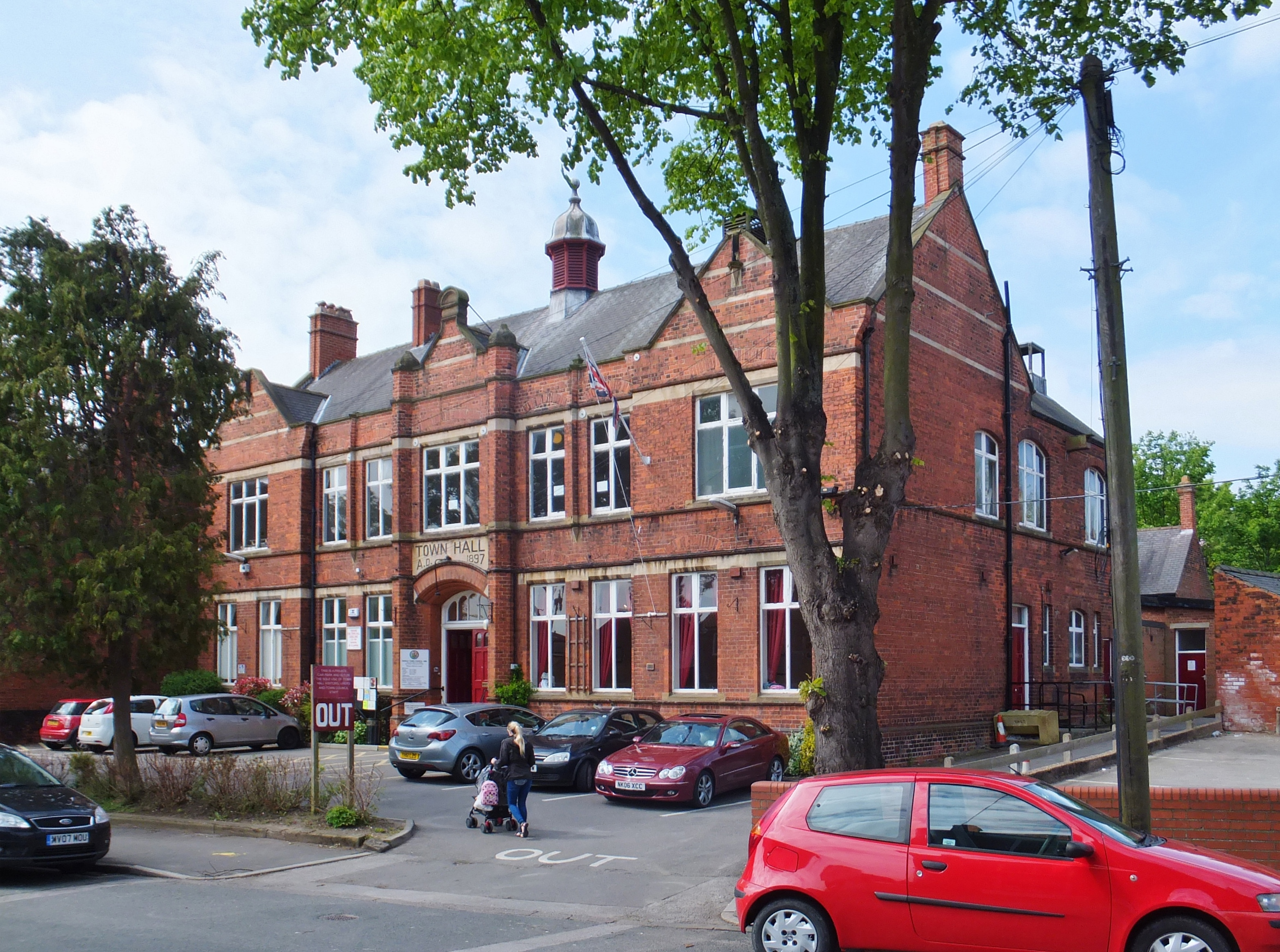
- Hessle Town Hall

- Shown in the East Riding of Yorkshire
- 53.7223°N 0.4381°W
- Location: South Lane, Hessle

History
- Built: 1897

Site notes
- Architectural style: Victorian style

Hessle Town Hall is a municipal building in South Lane, Hessle, East Riding of Yorkshire, England. It is the meeting place of Hessle Town Council.

== History ==
In the early 1890s, Hessle Parish Council decided to commission a dedicated parish hall: the site they selected was open land on the east side of South Lane. Construction work on the new building commenced after borrowings of £3,000 had been secured in January 1895. It was designed in the Victorian style, built in red brick with stone dressings and was officially opened in 1897.

The design involved a symmetrical main frontage with seven bays facing onto South Lane with the end bays gabled and slightly projected forward; the central bay, which was also slightly projected forward, featured an arched doorway with a brick architrave, above which there was a stone panel inscribed with the words "Town Hall A.D. 1897". The central bay and the end bays were fenestrated with three-light windows on the first floor while the other bays on both floors were fenestrated with cross windows. The central bay was flanked by full-height brick columns and surmounted by a gable. At roof level there was a louvered turret with a lead cupola. Internally, the principal room was the main assembly hall.

Following significant population growth, largely associated with the growing importance of Hessle as a commuter town for Kingston upon Hull, the area became an urban district with the town hall as its headquarters in 1899. In the absence of a dedicated catholic place of worship in the town, catholic church services were held in the town hall from 1928. The building ceased to be local seat of government when the enlarged Haltemprice Urban District Council was formed in 1935.

After the Second World War, the building was restored and re-opened by the Deputy-Secretary of the Ministry of Housing and Local Government, Sir John Wrigley, in 1948. Following the local government reorganisation in 1974, ownership of the building was transferred to Beverley Borough Council. It continued to operate as an events venue: significant concerts and theatrical performances included the opera, Haddon Hall, by Arthur Sullivan which took place at the town hall in May 1993. Hessle Town Council, which had been formed in 1986, acquired the building for a nominal sum in 1995 and subsequently carried out extensive refurbishment works, allowing it to become the offices and main meeting place of the council.
