= Listed buildings in Hessle =

Hessle is a civil parish in the county of the East Riding of Yorkshire, England. It contains 18 listed buildings that are recorded in the National Heritage List for England. Of these, two are listed at Grade I, the highest of the three grades, and the others are at Grade II, the lowest grade. The parish contains the town of Hessle, to the west of Kingston upon Hull. Most of the listed buildings are houses, cottages and associated structures, and the others include a church, a former windmill, a mortuary chapel, and the Humber Bridge.

== Key ==
Grade	Criteria
I	Buildings of exceptional interest, sometimes considered to be internationally important
II	Buildings of national importance and special interest

== Buildings ==
Name and location	Photograph	Date	Notes	Grade
All Saints' Church; 53.72412°N 0.43580°W		12th century	The church has been altered and extended through the centuries, especially during the 19th century. It is built in stone with lead roofs, and consists of a nave with a clerestory, north and south aisles, north and south porches, a chancel with north and south chapels and a north organ chamber, and a west steeple, the tower embraced by the aisles. The tower has three stages, buttresses, a pointed three-light west window, a moulded string course, three-light pointed bell openings, and clock faces, above which is a band and an embattled parapet with crocketed corner finials. On the tower is a tall spire with lucarnes. The whole of the body of the church has embattled parapets.	I
7 Northgate; 53.72467°N 0.43612°W		Early 18th century (probable)	The cottage is in colourwashed brick, with a stepped brick eaves cornice and a pantile roof. There is a single storey and attics, and two bays. The doorway is in the centre, and the windows are sashes.	II
9 Northgate; 53.72473°N 0.43612°W		Early 18th century	The cottage is in colourwashed brick, with a stepped brick eaves cornice and a pantile roof. There is a single storey and attics, and two bays. The doorway is in the centre, and the windows are modern.	II
11 and 13 The Square; 53.72357°N 0.43534°W		Mid-18th century	A house and shops on a corner site, in colourwashed brick, with a pantile roof, hipped on the corner. There are two storeys and an L-shaped plan, with six bays on Southgate, three bays facing The Square, and a later single-bay extension. On the ground floor are 20th-century shopfronts, and the extension contains an elliptical arch with wrought iron gates. Angled on the corner is a porch with Ionic columns. The upper floor contains sash windows with wedge lintels.	II
Stable block, Hesslewood; 53.71981°N 0.45991°W	—	1765	The stable block is in red brick with stone dressings and slate roofs. It consists of a main block with two storeys and three bays, and lower flanking two-storey three-bay wings. The main block has a dentilled and moulded cornice and a hipped roof, and contains three blocked elliptical gauged brick arches. The upper floor has a taking-in door, and there are sash windows on each floor, all under flat gauged brick arches. In the centre is a dated and initialled sundial. The wings each has a dentilled cornice and a hipped roof, and contains six-pane windows.	II
North Lodge; 53.72530°N 0.43521°W	—	c. 1770	The house is in colourwashed and pebbledashed brick with a slate roof. There are two storeys, four bays, and a parallel later range at the rear. On the front is a timber latticed porch and a doorway with a fanlight. The windows are sashes.	II
Hesslewood; 53.71940°N 0.45991°W		1789	A large house, later used for other purposes, in white brick, with stone dressings and slate roofs. It consists of a main block with two storeys and attics, and five bays, flanked by single-storey three-bay wings linked to two-storey single bay pavilions. The main block has a plinth, a floor and a sill band, a modillion cornice and a blocking course. In the centre is a porch with pilasters a dentilled cornice, and a pediment with a frieze decorated with festoons and rosettes. Steps lead up to the doorway that has a round-headed architrave and a fanlight with radial glazing. Most of the windows are sashes under wedge lintels. The right pavilion has a Venetian window on the ground floor and a Diocletian window above, and on the left pavilion is a French window.	II
Hessle Mount; 53.73062°N 0.45091°W	—	c. 1800	A house, later a school, in white brick, with dressings in brick and stone, floor and sill bands, moulded eaves, raked cornices, and hipped slate roofs. The original block has two storeys and five bays, the middle three bays projecting under a pediment with a shell ornament. In the centre is a round-arched porch with a keystone flanked by fluted pilasters and a Doric entablature. To its left are 20th-century replacement windows, and the other windows are sashes with cambered wedge lintels. To the right is a later three-bay extension containing a French window.	II
Cliff Mill; 53.71502°N 0.45261°W		1806	The former tower windmill, which has been restored, is in tarred brick, and consists of a tapering circular tower with six storeys. On the ground floor are segmental-headed openings of various sizes. Above is a four-light segmental-headed window on each floor, sockets and corbels for a former timber gallery, and a loading door.	II
Tranby House; 53.72496°N 0.45276°W	—	c. 1810	The house, later a school, is in light brown brick, with stone dressings, a floor band and a sill band, dentilled eaves, raked cornices, and a hipped slate roof. There are two storeys and five bays, the middle three bays projecting slightly under a low pediment. On the front is a Doric porch, and a doorway with a round-headed architrave and a radial fanlight. The windows are sashes in architraves, on the ground floor with round-headed arches, fluted architraves, and an impost band, and on the upper floor with segmental heads.	II
36 Northgate; 53.72555°N 0.43583°W		Early 19th century	The house is in grey brick, with a hipped slate roof. There are two storeys and three bays. The central doorway has a fluted architrave, a fanlight, and a bracketed open pediment. The windows are sashes under segmental channelled wedge lintels.	II
16–22 The Weir; 53.72376°N 0.43772°W		Early 19th century	The terrace of four houses, later used for other purposes, in grey brick with a hipped slate roof. There are two storeys and eleven bays. The doorways have rectangular fanlights in panelled soffits and reveals, and the windows are sashes. All the openings have cambered wedge lintels.	II
24 The Weir; 53.72398°N 0.43770°W		Early 19th century	A house, later used for other purposes, in colourwashed brick, with a bracketed timber eaves cornice, and a slate roof, hipped on the right. There are two storeys and three bays. In the centre is an Ionic porch with an entablature and a cornice, and a doorway with a fanlight in panelled reveals and soffit. To its right is a canted bay window, and the other windows are sashes with channelled wedge lintels, and raised and fluted keystones.	II
26 The Weir; 53.72409°N 0.43771°W		Early 19th century	A house, later used for other purposes, in brick, with a bracketed timber eaves cornice, and a slate roof, hipped on the left. There are two storeys and three bays, and a single-bay extension on the left. In the centre of the main block is an Ionic porch with an entablature and a cornice, and a doorway with a fanlight in panelled reveals and soffit. To its left is a canted bay window, and the other windows are sashes with channelled wedge lintels, and raised and fluted keystones. The extension has a carriage entrance on the ground floor, and an oriel window and a hipped roof above.	II
95 Ferriby Road; 53.72145°N 0.44913°W		Mid-19th century	The lodge to Hesslewood, later used for other purposes, it is in white brick, with stone dressings, deep overhanging eaves on paired brackets, and a pyramidal slate roof. There is a single storey with attics, and a square plan with a later rear extension. On the front is a projecting porch with pilasters, and the windows are sashes in architraves. Above are pedimented roof dormers with casement windows.	II
Mortuary Chapel, Hessle Cemetery; 53.72726°N 0.43619°W		1866	The chapel is in stone with a stone slate roof on corbels. It has a rectangular plan and three bays. Along the sides are three pointed moulded and dog-tooth arches on shafts with waterleaf capitals containing sunk panels, some inscribed. At each end is a pointed arch of three orders, with nook-shafts and waterleaf capitals, containing a wrought iron gate.	II
Woodlands Lodge; 53.72153°N 0.44808°W		1901	The house is in red brick, pebbledashed above the ground floor, with a slate roof, in Arts and Crafts style. There are two storeys and attics, a rectangular plan, and a two-storey service range and later extensions. The garden front has two wide bay windows on the ground floor, between them is an arch with a keystone, and above is a continuous cornice and decorated parapets. On the upper floor is a bay window and a sash window, over which is a bracketed cornice and a pedimented gable with a dated cartouche. The north entrance front has a doorway with a bracketed hood, and sash windows under segmental heads. Above the doorway is a balustraded parapet and a round-arched stair window.	II
Humber Bridge; 53.71109°N 0.45047°W		1973–81	The longest suspension bridge in the world, it carries the A15 road over the Humber Estuary, and extends for 1,410 metres (4,630 ft). There are two tapering reinforced concrete towers, 159 metres (522 ft) in height, with high tensile steel wire cables carrying a dual two-lane carriageway with footpaths and cycle tracks.	I
