= LCM (2) =

Vessel used for amphibious landings by the US in World War Two

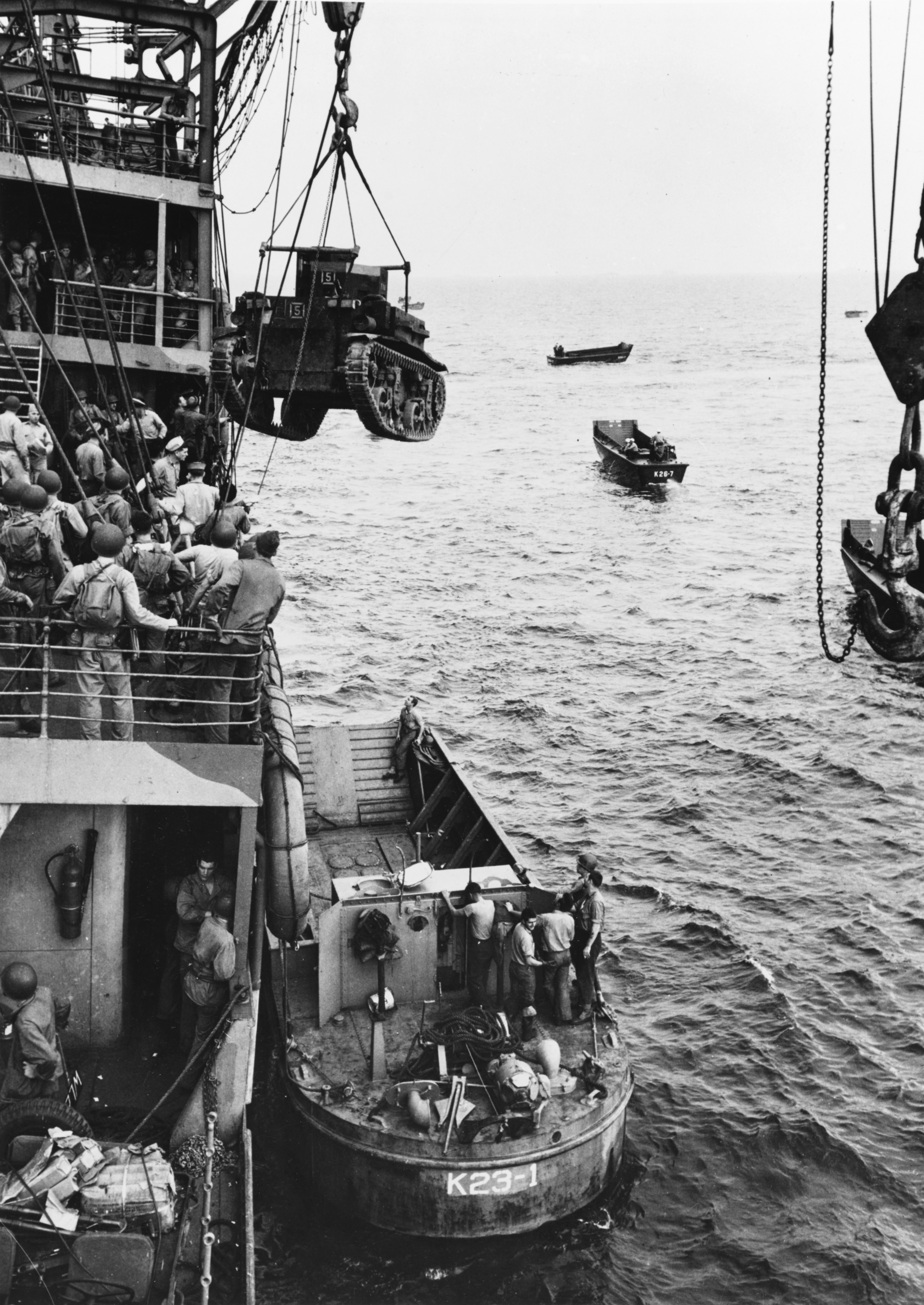
- An LCM (2) being loaded with an M2A4 light tank during landing operations at Guadalcanal

Class overview
- Name: Landing Craft, Mechanized Mark 2
- Builders: American Car & Foundry; Higgins Industries
- Operators: United States Navy; (United States) Coast Guard; (United States) Marine Corps; (United States) Army
- Preceded by: various lighters and dumb barges
- Succeeded by: LCM (3)
- Built: 1941–1942
- Completed: 147

General characteristics
- Type: Landing craft
- Displacement: 29 long tons (29,000 kg) light
- Length: 45 ft (14 m)
- Beam: 14 ft 1 in (4.29 m)
- Draft: 3 ft (0.91 m) mean
- Ramps: 1x hinged ramp forward
- Propulsion: 2x Kermath engines (gasoline), 225 hp (168 kW)
- Speed: 7.5 knots (8.6 mph; 13.9 km/h)
- Endurance: 75 nmi (139 km) at 7.5 knots
- Capacity: 13.5 long tons (13,700 kg) tankette or 30,000 lb (14,000 kg) general cargo
- Troops: 100 troops
- Crew: 4, a coxswain, an engineer, and two seamen
- Armament: 2x .50 cal. (12.7 mm) M2 Browning machine gun
- Armor: 1/4 inch plate across the front of the control station

The Landing Craft, Mechanized Mark 2 or LCM (2) was a landing craft used for amphibious landings early in the United States' involvement in the Second World War. Though its primary purpose was to transport light tanks from ships to enemy-held shores, it was also used to carry guns and stores. The craft was designed by the Navy's Bureau of Construction and Repair and the initial production contract was let to the American Car & Foundry Company. A total of 147 were built by this company and Higgins Industries. Because of its light load capacity and the rapid production of the superseding LCM (3), the LCM (2) quickly fell out of use following the Allied invasion of North Africa in 1942.

Constructed of steel, this shallow-draft, barge-like boat could ferry a small armored vehicle to shore at 7.5 knots (17 km/h). The craft was generally carried on the deck of a transport ship and then lowered into the water, a few miles from its objective, by crane or derrick. The cargo was then placed into the craft by crane or derrick. Once the LCM (2) had touched down on shore, the hinged ramp at the bow of the craft was lowered and the tank left the craft over the ramp under its own power.

== Origins ==
As early as 1930, the United States Marine Corps was interested in landing tankettes on beaches along with assaulting infantry. By the mid-1930s, Marine planners had settled on a beach assault procedure that involved a purpose-built craft for the initial assault wave, ships' boats and cutters for follow-on troops, and a purpose-built tank lighter for vehicles, guns, and supplies. Nevertheless, progress was difficult and slow due to lack of funding. Also, the Navy placed restrictions on such craft – considering transportation and deployment of them from available ships. (Note: The dimensions and weight of a landing craft had to stay within the restrictions imposed by the US Navy's davits and derricks.) By 1940, prototypes, of 38-foot to 40-foot long vessels, had been built and tested. The positive attributes of these were recognized and, by September 1940, the USMC had made known their requirements for a tank landing craft. The Navy's Bureau of Construction and Repair produced a 45-foot lighter capable of carrying the 15 ton Army model tank the Marines anticipated using. What evolved became the LCM (2), although at the time it was referred to using the Marine Corps designation of YL. (Note: The US Marine Corps used its own designations for landing craft before July 1942. For Marines, before that date, these craft were designated as follows: 30-foot boats, X; LCP(L), T Boat; LCP(R), TP Boat; LCV, TR Boat, and LCM, YL.)

== Service history ==
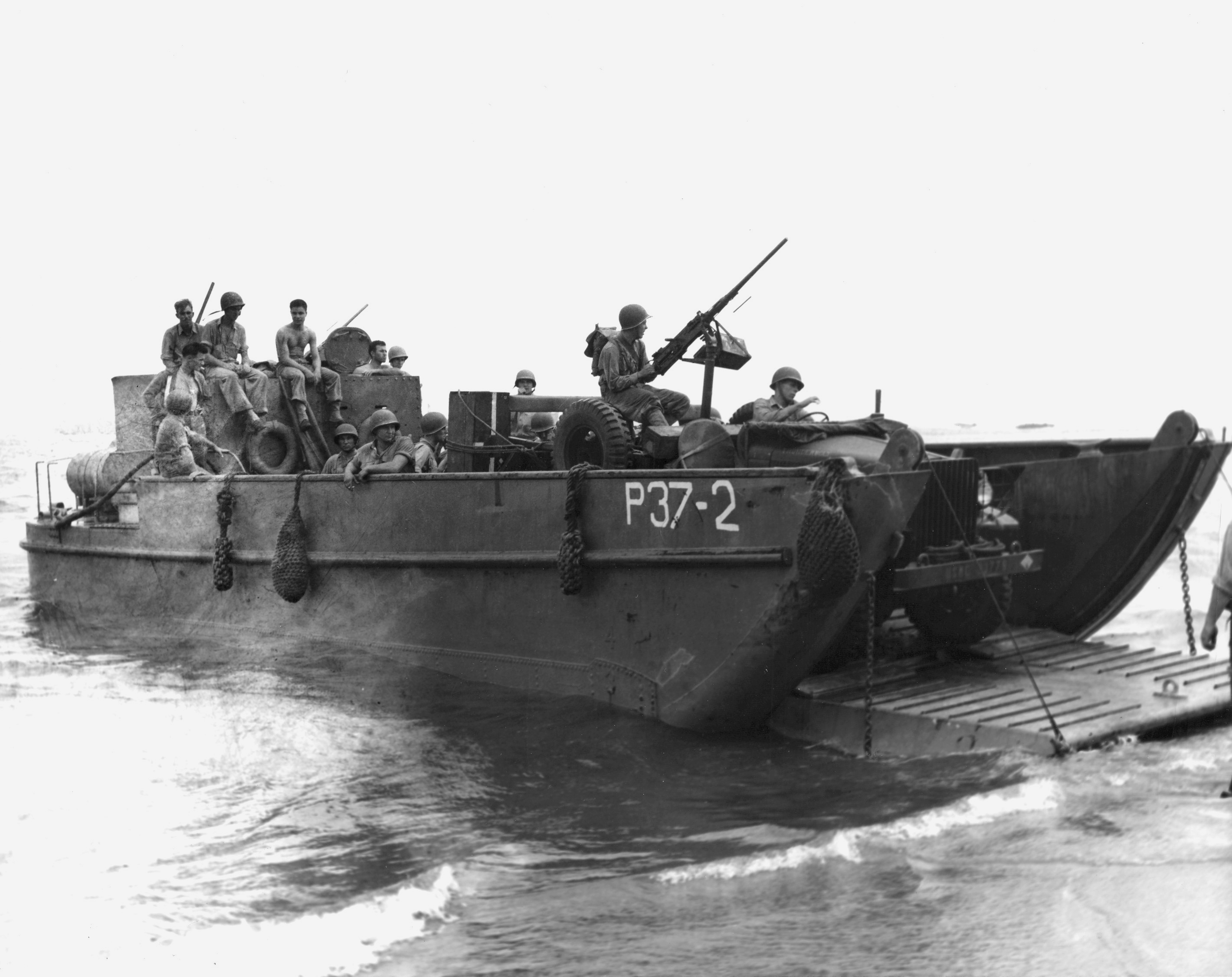
Ramp down, this LCM(2) prepares to disembark a Dodge command reconnaissance truck during the Guadalcanal campaign.

The war time US Navy publication Allied Landing Craft and Ships describes the operational use of the LCM (2) as "To land one light tank or motor vehicle."

In early August 1942, when the US Navy expedition arrived at Guadalcanal, it contained 48 LCM (2)s; almost the Navy's entire inventory of LCMs. The force also had a small assortment of earlier designs of barges and pontons, plus 116 Landing Craft Vehicle (LCV)s, each able to hold 10,000-pounds of cargo, such as a 75 mm pack howitzer, a 105 mm howitzer, or 1-ton truck, but heavier equipment (90 mm and 5-inch guns, heavy trucks, and the Marines' tanks) would have to be carried in the LCM (2)s.

In early November 1942, these craft operated with the Western Task Force, landing in the Casablanca area during Operation Torch. In July 1943, they saw limited service during the Sicily landings and a few still served as late as the Salerno landings in September 1943.

== See also ==
- LCP (L)
- LCM (1)
- LCVP (United States)
- Landing Craft Mechanized
- Landing Ship, Infantry
