= MV Spartan Lady =

Sunken oil tanker/oil spill

MV Spartan Lady was an oil tanker that sank in 1975.

It was built by Wilton-Fijenoord, and was launched on October 16, 1954, and delivered in January 1955 as Sologne. it measured 170 metres (560 ft) with a beam of 22.6 metres (74 ft) and a deadweight tonnage of 19,788 DWT. it was powered by a single diesel engine that gave it a service speed of 14.5 knots (16.7 mph). In 1972, it was renamed Spartan Lady, and at the time of its loss was flagged in Liberia, owned by Compania Marittma Laconia, and operated by Sea Spartan Steamship Agency.

On April 4, 1975, Spartan Lady was sailing through heavy seas about 150 miles (240 km) south of Martha's Vineyard when it sent a distress call at about 0810 local time. The United States Coast Guard dispatched four helicopters that arrived about two hours later, by which time the vessel had split in two. The Coast Guard airlifted all 36 crew members from the ship, though one subsequently died en route to shore. The survivors were flown to Coast Guard facilities on Governor's Island in New York and in Hyannis, Massachusetts. Spartan Lady's cargo of 500,000 gallons of oil was spilled into the ocean, though it was driven away from the coastline. It took several days for the wreckage of the ship to sink, and the Coast Guard eventually had to sink the bow section with gunfire.
