= USS Peoria (PF-67) =

1943 Tacoma-class frigate in the US Army

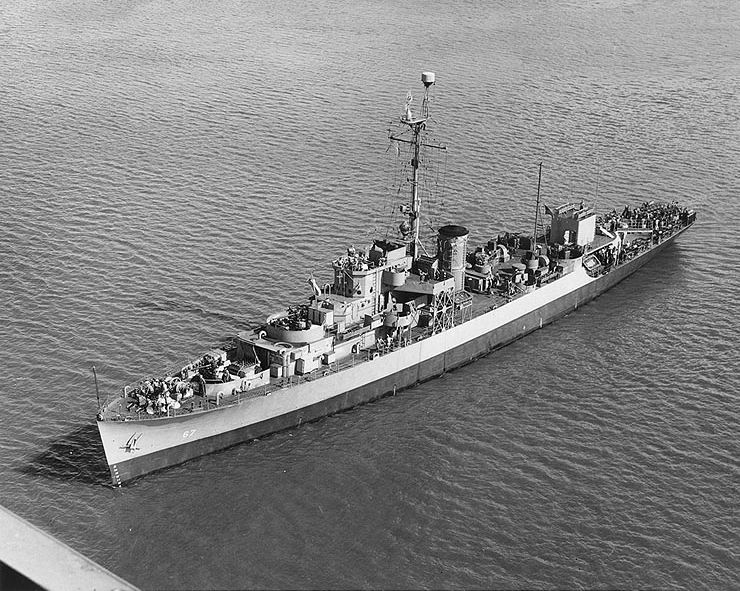
- USS Peoria (PF-67) off Charleston, South Carolina, following modification to a weather ship, c. June 1945

History

United States
- Name: Peoria
- Namesake: City of Peoria, Illinois
- Builder: Leathem D. Smith Shipbuilding Company, Sturgeon Bay, Wisconsin
- Launched: 2 October 1943
- Completed: 25 May 1943
- Commissioned: 2 January 1945
- Decommissioned: 15 May 1946
- Stricken: 19 June 1946
- Fate: Sold to Cuba, 16 June 1947

Cuba
- Name: Antonio Maceo
- Namesake: Antonio Maceo Grajales
- Acquired: 16 June 1947
- Fate: Sunk as a target, 1975

General characteristics
- Class & type: Tacoma-class frigate
- Displacement: 1,264 long tons (1,284 t)
- Length: 303 ft 11 in (92.63 m)
- Beam: 37 ft 11 in (11.56 m)
- Draft: 13 ft 8 in (4.17 m)
- Propulsion: 2 × 5,500 shp (4,101 kW) turbines; 3 boilers; 2 shafts
- Speed: 20 knots (37 km/h; 23 mph)
- Complement: 190
- Armament: 3 × 3"/50 dual purpose guns (3x1); 4 x 40 mm guns (2×2); 9 × 20 mm guns (9×1); 1 × Hedgehog anti-submarine mortar; 8 × Y-gun depth charge projectors; 2 × Depth charge tracks

USS Peoria (PF-67), a Tacoma-class frigate, was the third ship of the United States Navy to be named after Peoria, Illinois.

== Construction ==
Peoria was constructed by the Leathem D. Smith Shipbuilding Company, and was completed in Sturgeon Bay, Wisconsin on 25 May 1943. Launched on 2 October 1943 and sponsored by Agnes Reynolds, she was commissioned on 2 January 1945 at Houston, Texas, under the command of Commander George R. Leslie, USCG.

== Service history ==
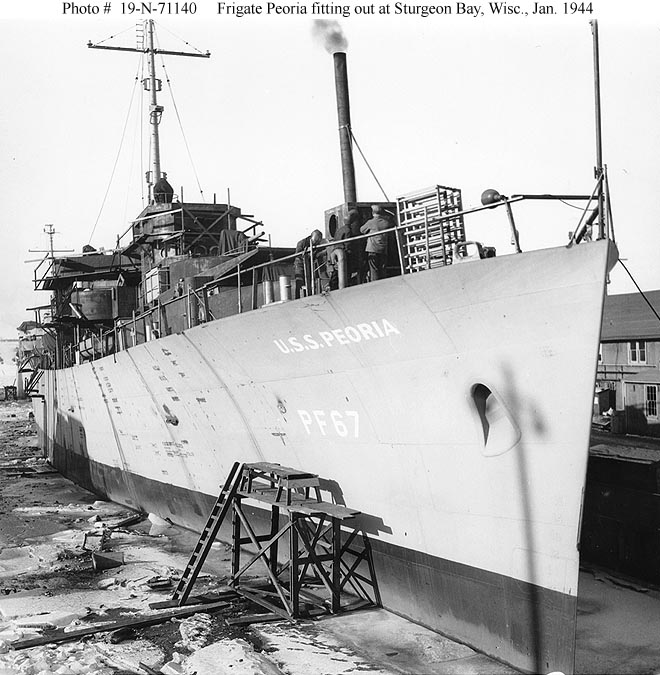
Peoria fitting out at Sturgeon Bay, Wisconsin, January 1944

Peoria's shakedown voyage (or sea trial) commenced on 12 January 1945, bound for the North Atlantic Ocean around Bermuda, and returned successfully to Norfolk, Virginia.

Peoria's first mission, begun on 4 March, was to sail with a convoy for the British Crown colony of Gibraltar. Peoria then continued on to Mers El Kébir, Algeria, concluding her journey on 19 March. She joined a returning convoy from Oran on 27 March, assigned with escorting it to the United States. Peoria then spent a brief amount of time at New York City, until she was called out for use in anti-submarine training at Casco Bay, Maine. On 7 May, she departed Casco Bay bound for New London, Connecticut. Peoria arrived at New London in time for VE day, as World War II concluded. Peoria spent two weeks training submarine crews at New London.

On 21 May, Peoria left New London, assigned to Charleston, South Carolina, where she was to be fitted out for patrol duty in the Atlantic. Peoria was used for weather station work from 21 June, visiting stations in North Atlantic ports from Bermuda to Iceland for a further year.

== Decommissioning and sale ==
On 15 May 1946, Peoria was officially decommissioned, and her name was removed from the Navy List four days later. Her sale to Cuba was overseen by the Foreign Liquidation Commission, part of the State Department.

Peoria was renamed Antonio Maceo (F-302) on 16 June 1947, and served in the Cuban Navy until 1975, when she was sunk.
