= Culross Island =

Island in Chugach Census Area, Alaska, United States

Coordinates: 60°42′19″N 148°12′02″W

Culross Island is an island near the western end of Prince William Sound of the Gulf of Alaska in Alaska, United States. It lies just off the Northeast corner of the Kenai Peninsula, separated from it by the Culross Passage. Approximately, Culross Island is 16 miles or 27 kilometers Southeast of Whittier in the Valdez-Cordova region. The island has a land area of 74.709 km^{2} (28.845 sq mi) and had no population at the 2000 census.

Culross Island is home to Goose Bay Cabin and Goose Bay Campground which is federally owned and managed by the USDA Forest Service. Goose Bay is approximately 25 miles or 40 kilometers Southeast of Whittier. The 16x16 ft or 78 meters squared cabin has been rebuilt as its original had been destroyed by an avalanche. The island which reaches up to 1,519 feet or approximately 463 meters could be a factor for the avalanche.

The island is currently undergoing a claim of Adverse Possession as of Alaska Statute 09.130.030 or Senate Bill 93 which states that any person(s) may claim land within 10 years or 7 years with good faith.

== Climate ==
Main Bay is the nearest weather station to Culross Island, located approximately 9 miles (14 km) to the southeast. Main Bay has a subarctic climate (Köppen Dfc).

Climate data for Main Bay, Alaska, 1991–2020 normals, extremes 1982–present: 57ft (17m)
Month	Jan	Feb	Mar	Apr	May	Jun	Jul	Aug	Sep	Oct	Nov	Dec	Year
Record high °F (°C)	50 (10)	47 (8)	52 (11)	64 (18)	76 (24)	86 (30)	85 (29)	83 (28)	71 (22)	58 (14)	55 (13)	55 (13)	86 (30)
Mean maximum °F (°C)	41.9 (5.5)	41.1 (5.1)	45.5 (7.5)	54.9 (12.7)	64.8 (18.2)	72.3 (22.4)	74.9 (23.8)	73.1 (22.8)	64.8 (18.2)	54.3 (12.4)	45.2 (7.3)	42.8 (6.0)	77.5 (25.3)
Mean daily maximum °F (°C)	31.2 (−0.4)	32.9 (0.5)	37.1 (2.8)	44.0 (6.7)	51.5 (10.8)	59.1 (15.1)	61.9 (16.6)	61.3 (16.3)	55.2 (12.9)	45.1 (7.3)	36.0 (2.2)	33.1 (0.6)	45.7 (7.6)
Daily mean °F (°C)	26.0 (−3.3)	27.3 (−2.6)	29.6 (−1.3)	36.8 (2.7)	43.2 (6.2)	51.1 (10.6)	56.0 (13.3)	55.3 (12.9)	49.1 (9.5)	39.7 (4.3)	31.2 (−0.4)	28.4 (−2.0)	39.5 (4.2)
Mean daily minimum °F (°C)	20.9 (−6.2)	21.6 (−5.8)	22.1 (−5.5)	29.7 (−1.3)	35.0 (1.7)	43.0 (6.1)	50.1 (10.1)	49.3 (9.6)	43.0 (6.1)	34.2 (1.2)	26.4 (−3.1)	23.6 (−4.7)	33.2 (0.7)
Mean minimum °F (°C)	4.0 (−15.6)	5.7 (−14.6)	7.4 (−13.7)	18.8 (−7.3)	29.4 (−1.4)	35.4 (1.9)	43.8 (6.6)	41.9 (5.5)	33.6 (0.9)	23.8 (−4.6)	13.9 (−10.1)	8.7 (−12.9)	−0.5 (−18.1)
Record low °F (°C)	−12 (−24)	−13 (−25)	−6 (−21)	2 (−17)	21 (−6)	28 (−2)	38 (3)	34 (1)	28 (−2)	10 (−12)	−4 (−20)	−9 (−23)	−13 (−25)
Average precipitation inches (mm)	18.78 (477)	16.74 (425)	14.25 (362)	14.12 (359)	13.20 (335)	7.89 (200)	10.92 (277)	17.26 (438)	24.85 (631)	24.80 (630)	21.04 (534)	23.04 (585)	206.89 (5,253)
Average snowfall inches (cm)	55.3 (140)	48.6 (123)	57.4 (146)	11.8 (30)	0.5 (1.3)	0.0 (0.0)	0.0 (0.0)	0.0 (0.0)	0.0 (0.0)	4.3 (11)	25.7 (65)	58.2 (148)	261.8 (664.3)
Average extreme snow depth inches (cm)	60.3 (153)	72.5 (184)	91.2 (232)	82.4 (209)	54.9 (139)	9.9 (25)	0.0 (0.0)	0.0 (0.0)	0.0 (0.0)	3.8 (9.7)	20.4 (52)	45.0 (114)	94.2 (239)
Average precipitation days (≥ 0.01 in)	19.1	17.6	16.6	16.9	16.8	15.9	18.2	19.3	22.6	22.3	19.2	22.1	226.6
Average snowy days (≥ 0.1 in)	12.2	11.8	10.9	3.4	0.3	0.0	0.0	0.0	0.0	2.0	7.8	14.1	62.5
Source 1: NOAA
Source 2: XMACIS2
