= CHANT (ship type) =

Prefabricated coastal tanker

Class overview
- Builders: Furness Shipbuilding Co Ltd, Haverton Hill-on-Tees; H Scarr Ltd, Hessle; Goole Shipbuilding & Repairing Co Ltd, Goole; Burntisland Shipbuilding Co Ltd, Burntisland; J Readhead & Sons Ltd, South Shields
- Operators: Ministry of War Transport
- Completed: 68
- Lost: 18
- Scrapped: 50

General characteristics
- Type: tanker
- Tonnage: 401 GRT; (in practice many were 402 or 403 GRT); 450 DWT
- Length: 148 ft 2 in (45.16 m) overall; 142 ft 2 in (43.33 m) between perpendiculars
- Beam: 27 ft (8.23 m)
- Draught: 8 ft 5 in (2.57 m)
- Installed power: 1 × diesel engine, 220 to 270 horsepower (160 to 200 kW)
- Propulsion: single propeller
- Speed: 7.5 knots (13.9 km/h)
- Crew: about 7
- Notes: Double bottom, flat bottom.

A CHANT (from Channel Tanker) was a type of prefabricated coastal tanker that was built in the United Kingdom during the Second World War due to a perceived need for coastal tankers after the invasion of France. Some CHANTs were adapted to carry dry cargos. These were known as the Empire F type coasters.

Although five CHANTs were lost during the war, the majority of the ships saw service post war, lasting into the 1990s.

== Design ==
The CHANT was developed with experience gained by building the Tug, Inshore and Dock (TID). As with the TIDs, CHANTs were built from prefabricated sections that were manufactured at various factories across the United Kingdom. A total of twenty-eight sections were welded together to make each ship. The largest sections weighed thirteen tons, which enabled them to be delivered by road. To simplify construction, they were built without compound curves, all plates being either flat or curved in one direction only, with the exception of the skeg at the stern. All joints were welded, with the final 10 inches (254 mm) being left unwelded at the factory to enable adjustment at the joints when the ship was assembled by the shipyard. Transverse sections were 10 feet (3.0 m) long, while the midbody sections were 20 feet (6.1 m) long.

CHANTs were designed by taking a vessel that was 148 by 27 feet (45.1 by 8.2 m) and using it as the basis for a straight line design. A model of the new design was then constructed for testing in a tank, which resulted in modification to the bow, involving the addition of a second chine. The revised design reduced the resistance to forward motion considerably. They were constructed with a flat bottom to enable them to ground on beaches, while a double hull was used to minimise any chance of leakage. Each CHANT had four sub-divided tanks, with a small circular oil hatch to allow the tanker to carry bulk oil. This was mounted in the centre of a larger rectangular hatch, which was used when the oil was in cans. A single mast with two derricks and winches was used to aid the loading and unloading of cased oil. They were not the most stable of ships, and needed to carry plenty of ballast. The vessels were fitted with 220/270 hp engines, giving a maximum speed of 7.5 knots (13.9 km/h), which was thought to be adequate because they were only intended for crossing the English Channel between southern England and French beaches. A total of 43 CHANTs were assembled at five different shipyards, and launched between February and May 1944.

Some cargo version (Empire-F type) were built with a "Chant" prefix name, which added some confusion about the real type of vessel (i.e. CHANT 41, CHANT 14, CHANT 39, and CHANT 49) were all Empire-F type despite their initial names. The cargo version had double skinned bottoms but a single skin on the sides. They had two holds and two hatches. Instead of a single mast in the middle that the Chant version had, the Empire version had a fore and aft mast and two 1.5 ton derricks. Four Empire-F vessels sold to Canadian owners were modified in order to have a single hold and a single hatch. The trunk on hold number 2 was therefore eliminated.

== Builders ==
=== H Scarr, Hessle ===
Henry Scarr Ltd, Hessle, Yorkshire built twelve vessels. They were named CHANT 1 to CHANT 12 inclusive. A further twelve ships were completed as "Empire F type" coasters, which would have been CHANT 14 to CHANT 21 and CHANT 46 to CHANT 49.

=== Goole Shipbuilding & Repairing ===
Goole Shipbuilding & Repairing Co Ltd, Goole, Yorkshire built nine vessels. They were named CHANT 22 to CHANT 28, CHANT 50 and CHANT 51. A further thirteen ships were completed as "Empire F type" coasters, which would have been CHANT 29 to CHANT 41.

=== Furness Shipbuilding, Haverton Hill-on-Tees ===
Furness Shipbuilding Co Ltd, at Haverton Hill shipyard, Haverton Hill-on-Tees, Co Durham built sixteen vessels. They were named CHANT 52 to CHANT 65 and CHANT 42 to CHANT 45, with the later numbered batch being built before Chants 42 to 45.

=== J Readhead & Sons, South Shields ===
J Readhead & Sons Ltd, South Shields, Co Durham built only two vessels; CHANT 60 and CHANT 61.

=== Burntisland Shipbuilding ===
Burntisland Shipbuilding Company Ltd, Burntisland, Fife built four vessels; CHANT 66 to CHANT 69.

== Empire F type coasters ==
The Empire F type coasters were a dry cargo version of the CHANT tankers. Due to the success of Operation Pluto, which put a fuel pipeline between the English and French coasts, the demand for CHANTs was not as high as had been thought initially. Although of the same dimensions as the CHANTS, the Empire Fs were 410-411 GRT and 460 DWT. They were driven by diesel engines of 300 horsepower (220 kW) and could make 8 knots (15 km/h). A total of twenty five were built. They were renamed with the prefix "Fabric" instead of "CHANT" while still under construction. All were renamed again before launch, carrying the "Empire" prefix and had a suffix beginning with "F". They were built by H Scarr Ltd, Hessle and Goole Shipbuilding & Engineering Ltd, Goole.

=== Built by H Scarr ===
The twelve Empire F type coasters were originally to have been named CHANT 14 to CHANT 21 and CHANT 46 to CHANT 49. Renamed with the prefix Empire, they served as Empire Fabric, Empire Fabian, Empire Fable, Empire Farringdon, Empire Fanfare, Empire Faversham, Empire Facility, Empire Faraway, Empire Fanal, Empire Fastness, Empire Farrier and Empire Fathom.

=== Built by Goole Shipbuilding ===
The thirteen Empire F type coasters built at Goole were originally to have been CHANT 29 to CHANT 41. They were renamed with the prefix Empire. They became Empire Factor, Empire Fairhaven, Empire Favourite, Empire Fashion, Empire Fans, Empire Farnham, Empire Farouche, Empire Farringay, Empire Farjeon, Empire Facet, Empire Fang, Empire Fairplay and Empire Fairway.

== D-Day ==
CHANTs were built to provide supplies of fuel to the Allied Forces in the aftermath of D-Day. Three CHANTs capsized during June 1944 and it was decided to use the Gooseberrys until stability tests had been carried out. CHANT 23 was disabled by a shell in her engine room but continued to refuel other ships. CHANT 26 was driven ashore on a large wave and ended up in a field having passed through a hedge. After discharging her cargo she was dragged back to the beach, refloated and towed back to the UK.

== Losses ==
=== Wartime ===
- On 5 June 1944, CHANT 63 capsized and sank off Flamborough Head, Yorkshire.
- On 8 June 1944, CHANT 61 capsized and sank off the Normandy beachhead.
- On 16 June 1944, CHANT 69 capsized off Normandy. She was sunk by gunfire from a Royal Navy ship.
- On 19 June 1944, CHANT 7 was driven ashore on the Normandy coast and capsized. Declared a constructive total loss.
- On 5 January 1945, CHANT 66 capsized and sank in Grangemouth Harbour while under repair. Although she was raised on 23 January, it was deemed uneconomic to repair her, and she was scrapped.

=== Post war ===
- On 11 December 1950, MV Bechuana (ex CHANT 54) ran aground near Port Nolloth, South Africa. Abandoned as a total loss.
- On 7 January 1951, MV Monty (ex CHANT 4) capsized and sank near the Torungen Lighthouse, Arendal, Norway.
- On 31 December 1951, MV Gemma (ex CHANT 51) capsized 10 nautical miles (19 km) from San Sebastián, Spain. Wreck drifted ashore and was scrapped in situ.
- On 26 September 1954, MV Necati Pehlivan II (ex CHANT 23) ran aground at Mariehamn, Finland and sank.
- On 16 March 1961, MV Lizzonia (ex CHANT 35 / Empire Farouche) was in collision with the Swedish MV Arctic Ocean 3 nautical miles (5.6 km) north west of the Varne Lightvessel, English Channel. Ship was abandoned and later sank.
- On 22 March 1961, MV Chresten (ex CHANT 10) struck a submerged object south of Grønsund, Denmark and sank near Stubbekøbing.
- On 18 March 1963, MV Agios Nektarios (ex CHANT 38 / Empire Facet) caught fire in the Ionian Sea. She was taken in tow by the SS Lastovo but sank near Patras, Greece.
- On 3 September 1966, MV Maria (ex CHANT 55) developed a leak and sank off the south coast of Cyprus at 34°21′N 34°50′E.
- On 22 April 1972, MV Gilani (ex CHANT 41 / Empire Fairway/ Selborne/Tynehaven/Champlain) capsized and sank at Vercheres Wharf, Montreal, Canada while being loaded. Later refloated and repaired. Reported to have been sold to new owners in Honduras in 1978 and lost at an unknown date.
- On 19 February 1974, MV Mahiri (ex CHANT 18 / Empire Fanringdon) developed a leak 94 nautical miles (174 km) south east of Tobago. Although she was taken in tow, she capsized and sank at 10°37′N 61°34′W.
- On 19 July 1975, MV Herma (ex CHANT 17 / Empire Faversham) foundered at Port of Spain, Trinidad.
- On 18 January 1989, MV Kamran (ex CHANT 57) foundered off Abu Musa, United Arab Emirates (25°50′N 55°22′E.
- On 1 January 1991, MV Fermont (ex CHANT 49 / Empire Fathom/Fosdyke Trader/Fort Carillon/Janolyne) was beached on Seal Island, Nova Scotia, Canada (43°24′N 24°03′W). Her back was broken and she was declared a total loss. The wreck still exists as of 2009.

== Last in service ==
The MV Fermont (ex CHANT 49), which ran aground in 1991, was the last EMPIRE F type vessel in commercial service.

CHANT 28, which had been sold to the French Government in 1946, was still in service at Le Havre, France in 1981, her name never having been changed. She was scrapped in 1986.

The Success III (ex CHANT 12), in Rotterdam was probably the very last Chant vessel in service in June 2002. She was scrapped in 2007 in Ghent, Belgium.
