= Hessle =

Town and civil parish in the East Riding of Yorkshire, England

Coordinates: 53°43′24″N 0°26′06″W

- Town and civil parish
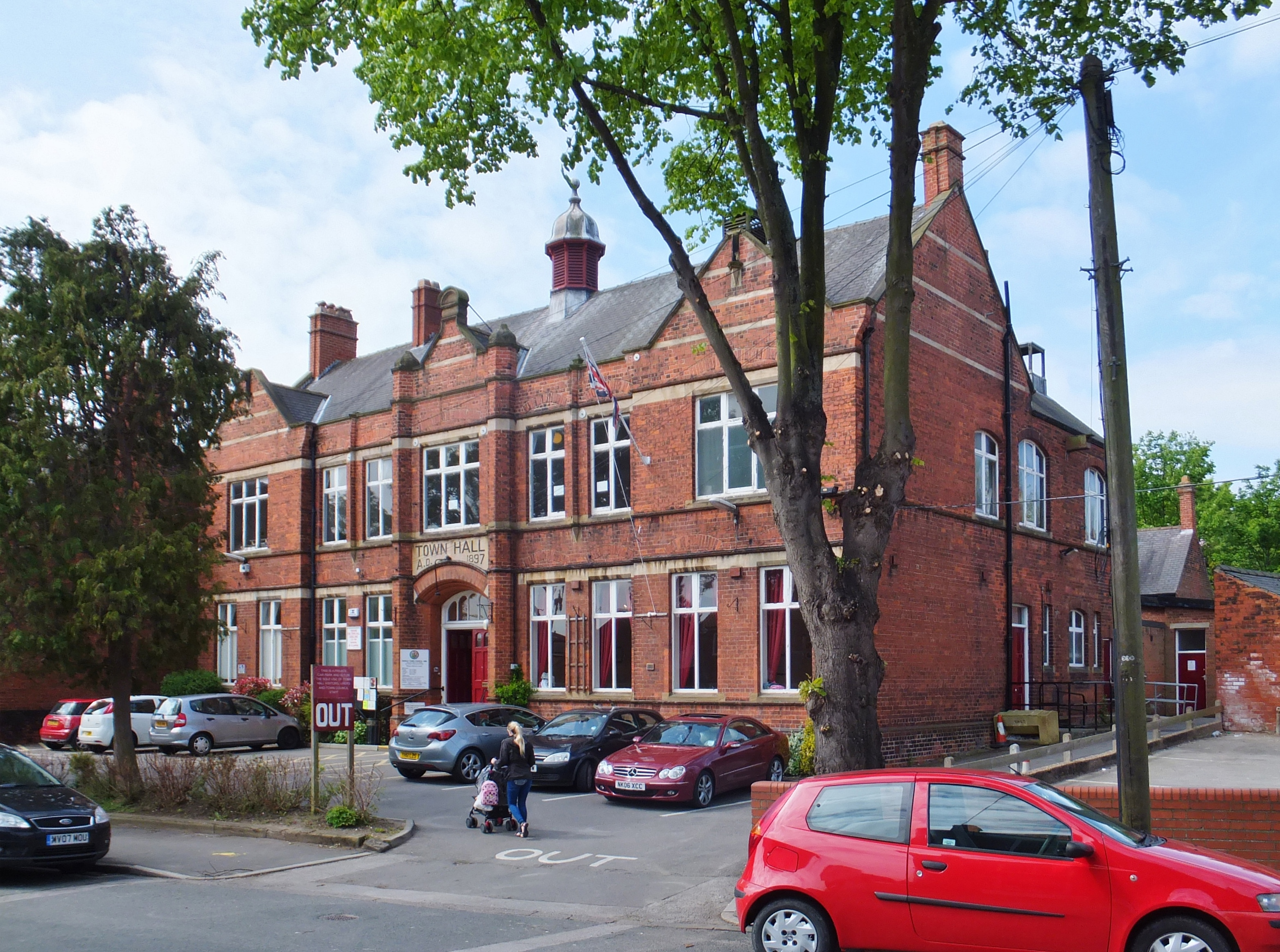
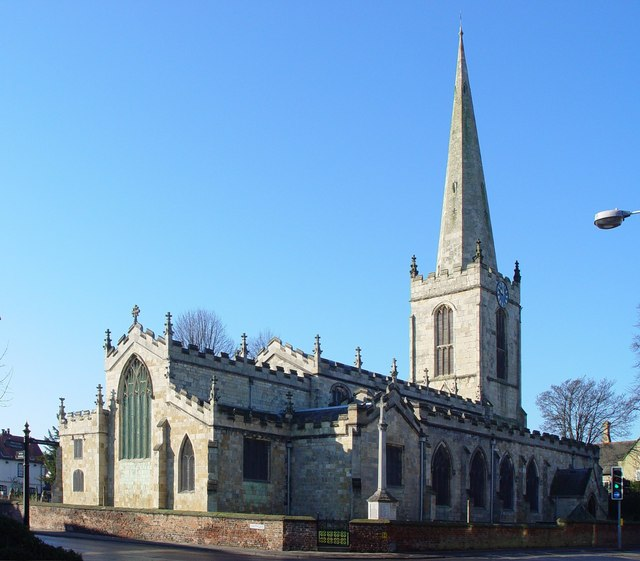
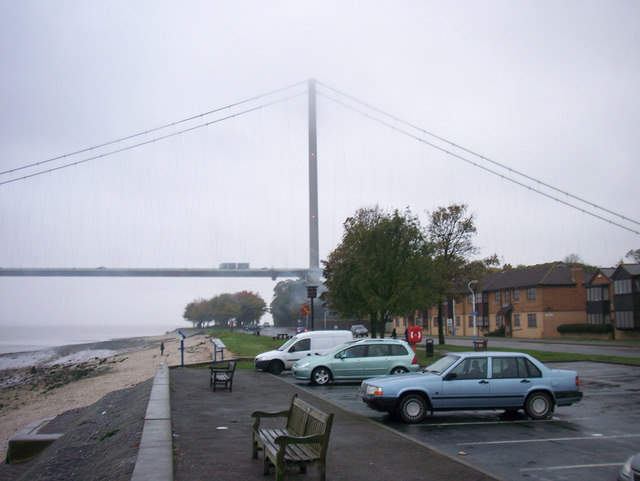
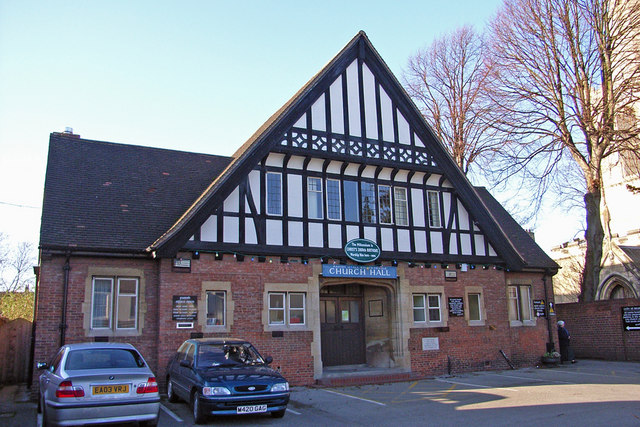
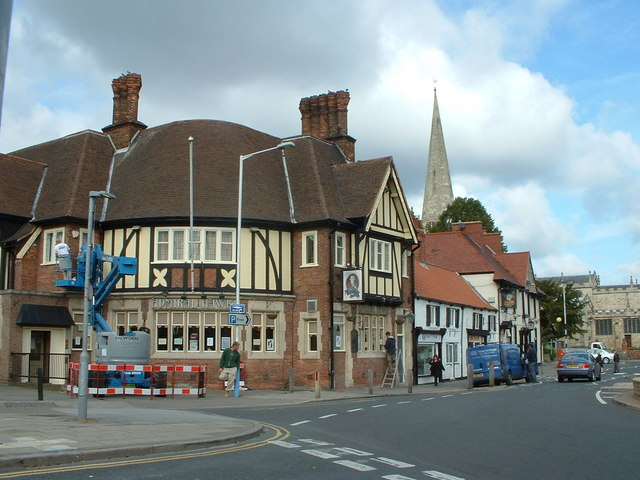
- Hessle Town Hall All Saints Church Humber Bridge from Hessle Viewpoint Church Hall The Square

- Location within the East Riding of Yorkshire
- Population: 15,485 (2021 Census)
- OS grid reference: TA034264
- Civil parish: Hessle
- Unitary authority: East Riding of Yorkshire
- Ceremonial county: East Riding of Yorkshire
- Region: Yorkshire and the Humber
- Country: England
- Sovereign state: United Kingdom
- Post town: HESSLE
- Postcode district: HU13
- Dialling code: 01482
- Police: Humberside
- Fire: Humberside
- Ambulance: Yorkshire
- UK Parliament: Kingston upon Hull West and Haltemprice

Hessle (/ˈhɛzəl/) is a town and civil parish in the East Riding of Yorkshire, England, 5 miles (8 kilometres) west of Kingston upon Hull. Geographically it is part of a larger urban area consisting of the city of Kingston upon Hull, the town of Hessle and a number of other villages but is not part of the city. It is on the north bank of the Humber Estuary where the Humber Bridge crosses.

At the 2021 census, Hessle parish had a population of 15,485, an increase on the 2011 UK census figure of 15,000.

== Amenities ==
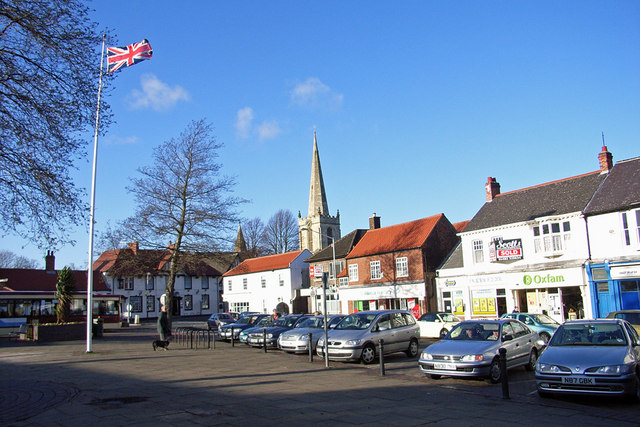
The Square in January 2007

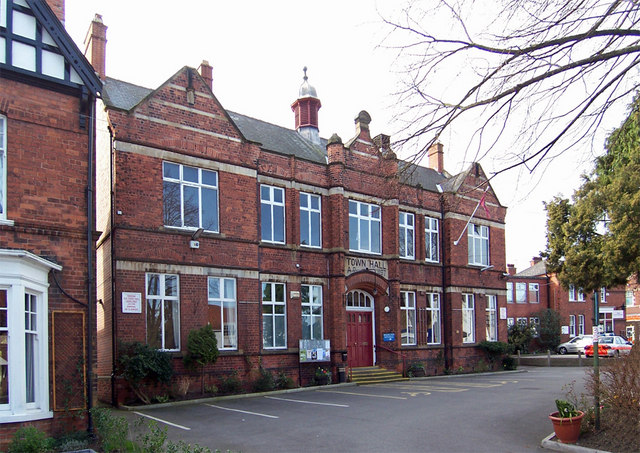
Hessle Town Hall

The centre of Hessle is the Square. There are many shops and a small bus station, which was refitted in 2007. All Saints' Church, Hessle is located just off the Square and was designated a Grade I listed building in 1967 and is now recorded in the National Heritage List for England, maintained by Historic England. Hessle Town Hall was built in 1897 and is situated at the top of South Lane. Hessle Police Station, which closed in 2014, is next door to the town hall at the top of South Lane and the corner of Ferriby Road.

Hessle is home to the world-famous Humber Bridge, which was opened by Queen Elizabeth II in 1981. At the time of its opening, the Humber Bridge was the world's longest single-span suspension bridge. It links Hessle to the town of Barton-upon-Humber on the opposite side of the Humber estuary. In July 2017 the bridge was granted Grade I listed status.

== History ==
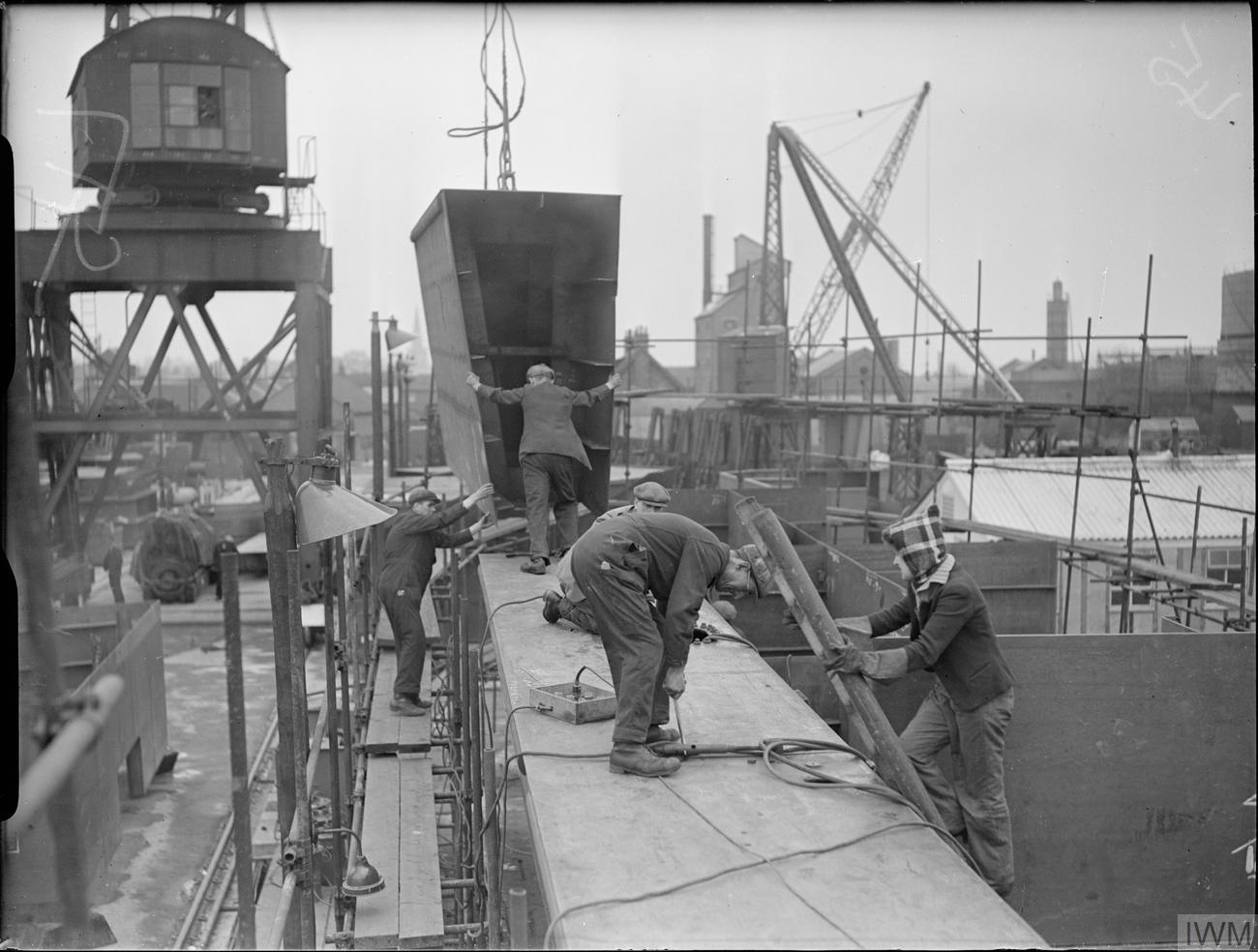
Workers shipbuilding in Hessle for the Royal Navy during the Second World War.

The place-name 'Hessle' is first attested in the Domesday Book of 1086, where it appears as Hase. It appears as Hesla in a Danelaw Charter from the reign of Henry II between 1154 and 1189, and as Hesel in a Yorkshire Charter of 1157, and in 1242 in the Book of Fees. The name is the Old Scandinavian hesli meaning 'hazel grove'.

In more modern times, Hessle has been a centre for shipbuilding. Before 1897, there was a shipyard building wooden boats, but it was then bought by Henry Scarr who moved there from Beverley, where he had previously been in partnership with his brother Joseph. Scarr produced iron and steel ships until 1932, when the yard was taken over by Richard Dunston. It was the largest shipyard in Hessle, building vessels such as Loch Riddon, a roll-on/roll-off ferry launched in 1986, and one of four built for Caledonian MacBrayne for use in the Hebrides. The company went into liquidation in 1987 and was bought by Damen Shipyards Group in the same year. Dunston's was closed down in 1994. The location is now used as offices, car sales buildings and a dock for scrap metal and other materials for dispatch to other areas, or to be recycled. Richard Dunston's ship repairs still exists further east along the Humber Estuary, with activity remaining high.

== Geography ==
Hessle is surrounded by the neighbouring villages of Willerby, Anlaby, Kirk Ella, West Ella, North Ferriby and Swanland.

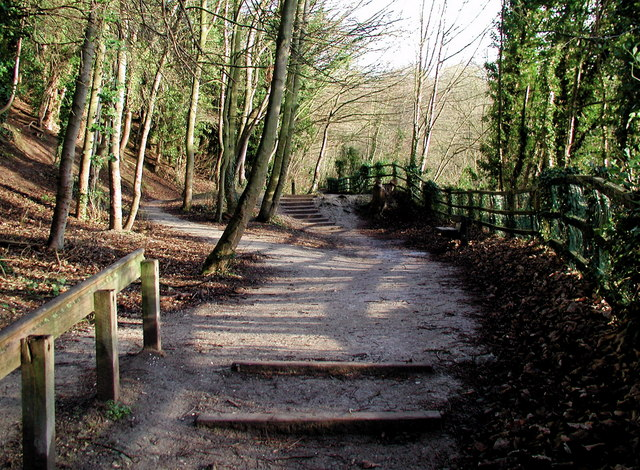
Humber Bridge Country Park in December 2006

Chalk-quarrying was a major industry at Hessle into the 20th century and quarries can still be seen in the west of the town, the largest being the Humber Bridge Country Park, which is a popular tourist attraction. Part of it is known as Little Switzerland (Little Switz or Switzy for short).

The Humber Bridge Country Park Local Nature Reserve was formerly a chalk quarry and was developed as a country park following the construction of the Humber Bridge. It consists of mixed species of woodland, wild flowers, a spring-fed pond and herb-rich grassland. The park can be explored on several well-signed walking routes.

Hessle is twinned with the French town of Bourg-de-Thizy.

Transport to and from Hessle is convenient, with good access to main roads such as the A15, A63 and M62 (via the A63). It also has a railway station with hourly services to and from Hull and to destinations such as Doncaster and York. Regular bus services provided by East Yorkshire link the town with the surrounding villages, Hull City Centre, Longhill Estate in east Hull as well as further afield places including Brough, Beverley and the seaside resort of Hornsea.

Hessle is at the start of the Yorkshire Wolds Way, a long-distance footpath and designated National Trail, which crosses the Yorkshire Wolds and ends at Filey on the North Sea Coast.

== Education ==
The site of the town's secondary school, Hessle High School & Sixth Form College, on Heads Lane, is centred on a building donated to the Education Authority by Algernon Henry Barkworth, a survivor of the RMS Titanic sinking. Hessle Sixth Form College is part of a consortium with secondary schools Wolfreton School (in Willerby) and Cottingham High School (in Cottingham), offering sixth form pupils a chance to attend classes at any of the three schools within the consortium. The entire school was reopened in January 2016, as part of Priority Schools Building Programme. Since January 2017, Penshurst Primary School and Hessle High School & Sixth Form College have been a through-school.

Penshurst Primary School, for children aged 3–11, located on Winthorpe Road. Hessle is also home to All Saints' CE Federation of Academies Infant and Junior School, a Church of England school for children aged 3–11, located on Northolme Road.

== Media ==
Local news and television programmes are provided by BBC Yorkshire and Lincolnshire and ITV Yorkshire. Television signals are received from the Belmont TV transmitter.

Local radio stations are BBC Radio Humberside, Capital Yorkshire, Greatest Hits Radio East Yorkshire & Northern Lincolnshire, Hits Radio East Yorkshire & North Lincolnshire and Nation Radio East Yorkshire.

The town is served by the local newspaper, Hull Daily Mail.

Plate commemorating the women of Hessle Road at Hull Maritime Museum

== Notable people ==
- Lucy Beaumont (born 1983), comedian, lived in Hessle.
- Lillian Bilocca (1929–1988), fisheries worker and safety campaigner, born in Hessle.
- Stephen C. West (born 1952) biochemist and molecular biologist, expert on DNA recombination and repair, born in Hessle.

== See also ==
- Listed buildings in Hessle

== Bibliography ==
- Gazetteer – A–Z of Towns Villages and Hamlets. East Riding of Yorkshire Council. 2006. p. 6.
- Taylor, Mike (2009). Richard Dunston Limited of Thorne & Hessle. Barnsley: Pen and Sword Books. ISBN 978-1-84563-094-2.
